= Francis Berkeley, 2nd Baron FitzHardinge =

British politician (1826–1896)

Francis William FitzHardinge Berkeley, 2nd Baron FitzHardinge FSA (16 November 1826 – 28 June 1896), was a British Liberal Party politician.

== Background and education ==
FitzHardinge was the eldest son of Admiral Maurice Berkeley, 1st Baron FitzHardinge, and Lady Charlotte, daughter of Charles Lennox, 4th Duke of Richmond. He was educated at Rugby.

== Career ==
In early adulthood he served as a captain in the Royal Horse Guards. Later he was appointed Honorary Colonel of the Royal South Gloucestershire Light Infantry Militia on 22 December 1857 in succession his uncle William Berkeley, 1st Earl FitzHardinge. In the 1860s Col Berkeley took over as Lieutenant-Colonel Commandant of the regiment, reverting to hon col on 26 May 1868. He sat as the Member of Parliament (MP) for Cheltenham between 1856 and 1865. Two years later he succeeded his father in the barony and was enabled to take a seat in the House of Lords. He was also a Fellow of the Society of Antiquaries.

== Family ==
Lord FitzHardinge married Georgina, daughter of William Holme-Sumner, in 1857. The marriage was childless. He died in London in June 1896, aged 69, and was succeeded in the peerage by his younger brother, Charles. Lady FitzHardinge died in July 1897, aged 66.

Parliament of the United Kingdom
Preceded by Grenville Berkeley	Member of Parliament for Cheltenham; 1856–1865	Succeeded by Charles Schreiber
Peerage of the United Kingdom
Preceded by Maurice Berkeley	Baron FitzHardinge; 1867–1896	Succeeded by Charles Berkeley
