= Gloucestershire Regiment =

Former British Army regiment

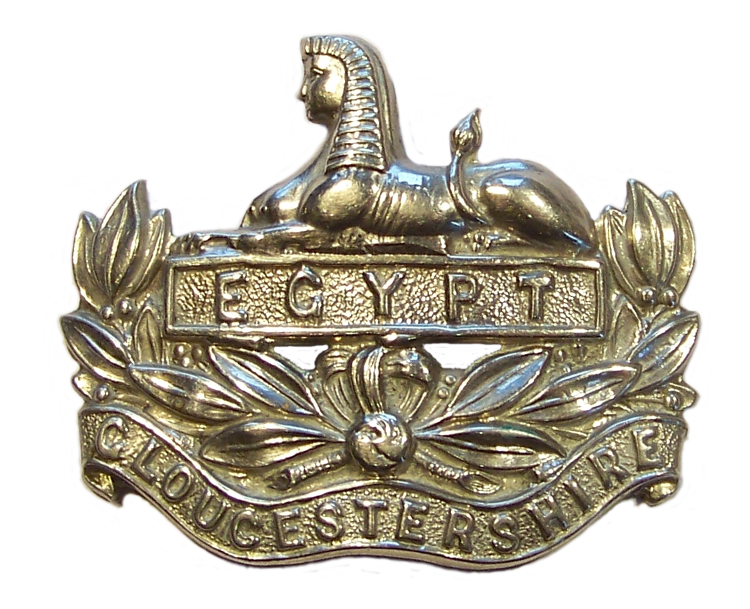
- Cap badge of the Gloucestershire Regiment
- Active: 1881–1994
- Country: United Kingdom
- Branch: British Army
- Type: Infantry
- Role: Line infantry
- Garrison/HQ: Horfield Barracks, Bristol
- Nicknames: The Glorious Glosters, Slashers
- Motto: By our deeds we are known
- March: The Kinnegad Slashers
- Anniversaries: Back Badge Day (21 March)
- Decorations: Presidential Unit Citation

Insignia
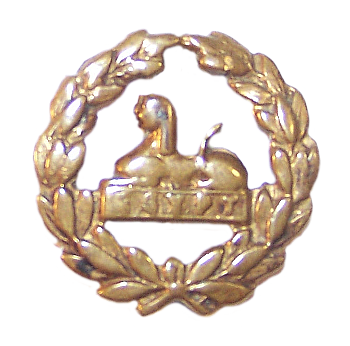
- Back badge

The Gloucestershire Regiment, commonly referred to as the Glosters, was a line infantry regiment of the British Army from 1881 until 1994. It traced its origins to Colonel Gibson's Regiment of Foot, which was raised in 1694 and later became the 28th (North Gloucestershire) Regiment of Foot. The regiment was formed by the merger of the 28th Regiment with the 61st (South Gloucestershire) Regiment of Foot. It inherited the unique distinction in the British Army of wearing a badge on the back of its headdress as well as the front, a tradition that originated with the 28th Regiment after it fought in two ranks back to back at the Battle of Alexandria in 1801. At its formation the regiment comprised two regular, two militia and two volunteer battalions, and saw its first action during the Second Boer War.

Before the First World War, the regiment's four auxiliary battalions were converted to three Territorial Force battalions and a Special Reserve battalion; a further 18 battalions were added to the regiment's establishment during the war. Sixteen battalions of the regiment saw active service in France and Flanders, Italy, Gallipoli, Egypt, Mesopotamia, Persia and Salonika, losing a total of 8,100 men killed and winning 72 different battle honours. Four awards of the Victoria Cross (VC) were made to soldiers serving with the regiment. The wartime battalions were disbanded as the war ended, and just before the Second World War, two of the territorial battalions were re-purposed and ceased to have any affiliation with the regiment. On the eve of the war, the remaining territorial battalion was duplicated, and another five battalions were raised on the outbreak of war, though most of these were disbanded or re-purposed as the war progressed. Four battalions saw active service under the regiment's colours during the war. The 2nd and 5th Battalions both fought in the Battle of France and, after being lost almost in its entirety during the Battle of Dunkirk, the re-formed 2nd Battalion landed at Gold Beach on D-Day and fought in the Allied campaign in North-West Europe. The 1st Battalion was involved in the retreat from Rangoon during the Japanese conquest of Burma, and the 10th Battalion saw active service in the defeat of Japanese forces during the Burma Campaign 1944–45.

After the Second World War, the hostilities-only battalions were disbanded and the 1st and 2nd Battalions were amalgamated, leaving the regiment with one regular and one Territorial Army battalion. The regiment achieved fame during the Korean War when the 1st Battalion held out for three nights against overwhelming odds during the Battle of the Imjin River. The stand, described by the commander of the United Nations forces in Korea at the time as "the most outstanding example of unit bravery in modern war", prevented the encirclement of other United Nations forces, for which the regiment was awarded the Presidential Unit Citation and earned the nickname The Glorious Glosters. Two men serving with the regiment were awarded the VC for their actions in the battle. In the latter half of the 20th century, the regiment was reduced to a single regular battalion and completed tours of duty around the world, including Germany, Africa, the Caribbean, Central America and the Middle East, as well as in Northern Ireland during The Troubles. Shortly after celebrating its tercentenary in 1994, the regiment, which carried more battle honours on its colours than any other regiment of the line, was merged with the Duke of Edinburgh's Royal Regiment to form the Royal Gloucestershire, Berkshire and Wiltshire Regiment. The new regiment inherited the back badge, and when it too was merged in 2007, it passed the tradition on to its successor, The Rifles.

== Origins ==
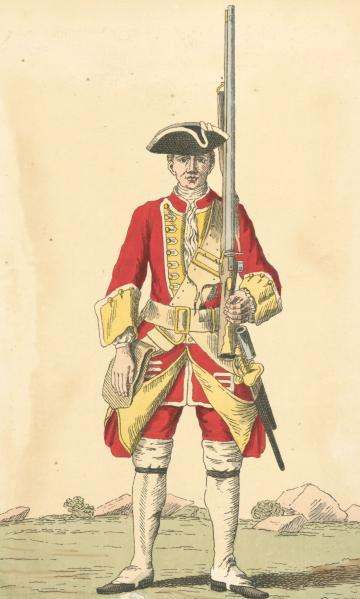
Uniform of the 28th c. 1742 with its yellow facings

The Gloucestershire Regiment traced its roots to Colonel Gibson's Regiment of Foot, raised in 1694 in Portsmouth, which first saw action in 1705 during the War of the Spanish Succession. Having been commanded by, and therefore named after, a succession of colonels, the regiment was renamed in 1742 as the 28th Regiment of Foot and fought under this name during the War of the Austrian Succession. Another predecessor, the 61st Regiment of Foot, was formed in 1758 when the British Army was expanded during the Seven Years' War. The 61st Regiment gained its first battle honour a year later during the invasion of Guadeloupe, the same year that General Wolfe placed himself at the head of the 28th Regiment on the Plains of Abraham in the capture of Quebec.

In 1782, the British Army began linking foot regiments with counties for the purposes of recruitment. For the first time the county of Gloucestershire was associated with both the 28th and 61st Regiments, which were renamed as the 28th (North Gloucestershire) Regiment of Foot and the 61st (South Gloucestershire) Regiment of Foot. Both regiments began to recruit from the county, and it was in Gloucester in December 1782 that the 61st Regiment was presented with new colours to replace those lost during the Franco-Spanish invasion of Minorca earlier that year.

In March 1801, the 28th Regiment formed part of the British expeditionary force that landed at Aboukir Bay in Egypt to oppose Napoleon's Army of the East. On 21 March, during the Battle of Alexandria, French cavalry broke through the British lines, formed up behind the regiment, and began to charge. With the men still heavily engaged to their front, the order was given for the rear rank to turn about, and standing thus in two ranks back to back, the regiment held the line. To commemorate this action, the regiment began wearing a badge on the back as well as the front of the headdress, a unique distinction in the British Army that was officially sanctioned in 1830. (Note: The origins of the back badge and its initial form are not known; other than the honour "Egypt", awarded to all units, there is no record of a special badge being officially granted. An officer who served with the regiment between 1805 and 1807 wrote that the regiment "acquired the emblem of the double front." In 1815, a staff officer witnessed the regiment marching out to Quatre Bras "having their number both in front and rear of their low caps—a memorial of Egypt." The first record of official recognition appears in an 1830 letter from the Horse Guards, which states that "it was never the intention to deprive the 28th Regiment of any badge of honour they may have acquired by their distinguished service in Egypt, and that there will be no objection to their retaining the plate they have been accustomed to wear on the back of their caps since that service..." This was officially confirmed in another letter dated 1843. It is possible, therefore, that the back badge was introduced by the regiment shortly after the Battle of Alexandria, but not officially sanctioned until 1830.) The 61st Regiment also deployed to Egypt and, although arriving too late to play an active part, was, like the 28th Regiment, awarded the battle honour "Egypt" and the right to display the Sphinx on its colours.

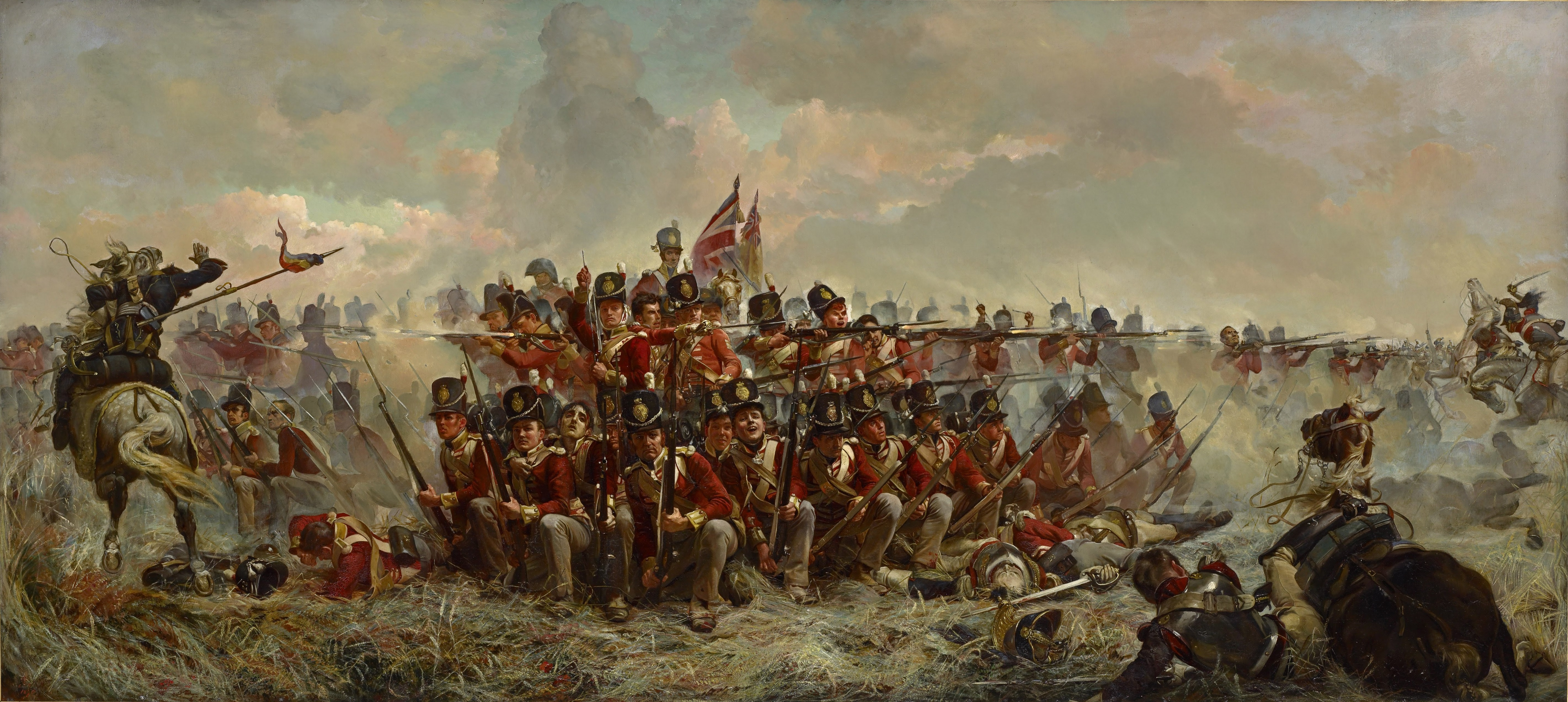
The 28th Regiment at Quatre Bras

During the 19th century, relatively uneventful postings at home and abroad were punctuated with periods of active service. The 28th and 61st Regiments both fought in Spain and Portugal during the Peninsular War. The 28th Regiment also participated in the final defeat of Napoleon; it was commended by the Duke of Wellington for gallantry in the Battle of Quatre Bras and saw action again in the Battle of Waterloo. In the mid-19th century, both regiments were deployed to India, and the 61st Regiment saw active service during the Second Anglo-Sikh War and the Indian Mutiny, adding "Chillianwallah", "Goojerat", "Punjaub" and "Delhi 1857" to the list of battle honours that the Gloucestershire Regiment would soon inherit. The 28th Regiment, whose time in India was shorter and less eventful, was meanwhile deployed to the Crimea and added "Alma", "Inkerman" and "Sevastopol" to its legacy.

Another thread that would be woven into the story of the Gloucestershire Regiment is that of the civilian administered auxiliary forces that supported the army in times of need. In the mid-18th century, county militia regiments were raised for home defence and as a pool of reserves for the regular army. In 1759, the Gloucestershire Militia had been reorganised into two battalions of militia, and these were organised in 1763 as the South Gloucestershire Militia based at Gloucester and the North Gloucestershire Militia at Cirencester. In 1859, county-based volunteer rifle corps were raised, leading to the formation of the 1st (City of Bristol) Gloucestershire Rifle Volunteer Corps and the 2nd Gloucestershire Rifle Volunteers.

== Formation ==
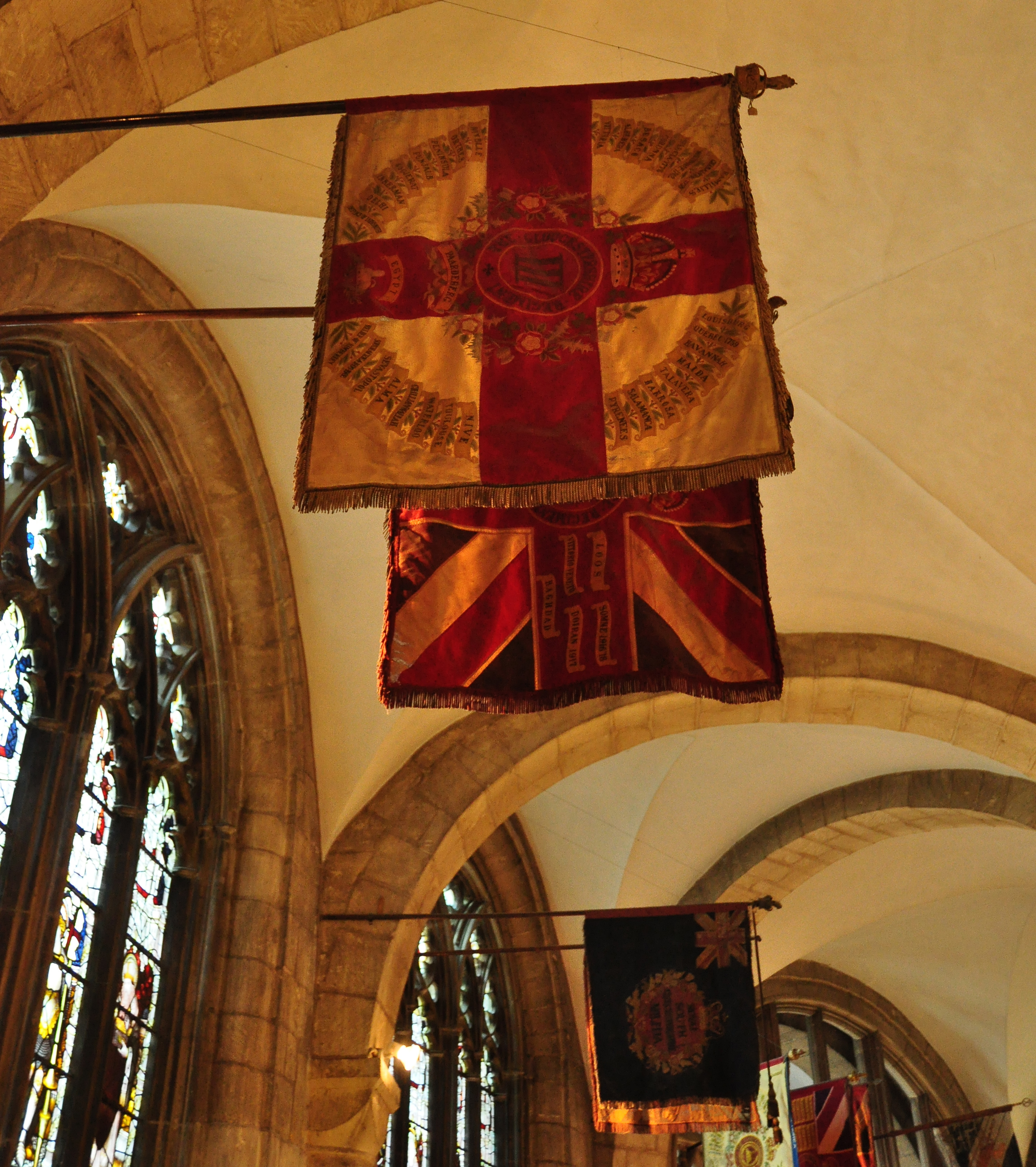
The regimental colours in Gloucester Cathedral

In 1872, the Cardwell Reforms began the process of organising the British Army along county lines based on two-battalion line infantry regiments, a process that was completed by the Childers Reforms nine years later. As a result, the 28th and 61st Regiments were amalgamated in 1881 to form the Gloucestershire Regiment, headquartered at Horfield Barracks in Bristol. The reforms also added the county's auxiliary forces to the regiment's establishment, and at its formation it thus comprised two regular, two militia and two volunteer battalions:

- 1st Battalion – formerly the 28th (North Gloucestershire) Regiment of Foot
- 2nd Battalion – formerly the 61st (South Gloucestershire) Regiment of Foot
- 3rd (Militia) Battalion – formerly the Royal South Gloucestershire Militia
- 4th (Militia) Battalion – formerly the Royal North Gloucestershire Militia
- 1st (City of Bristol) Volunteer Battalion – formerly the 1st (City of Bristol) Gloucestershire Rifle Volunteers
- 2nd Volunteer Battalion – formerly the 2nd Gloucestershire Rifle Volunteers

The Gloucestershire Regiment inherited from the 28th Regiment the privilege of wearing the back badge. It was a privilege that the 2nd Battalion did not want, but it was made palatable to the former 61st Regiment by replacing the number 28 with the Sphinx, a battle honour awarded to both predecessor regiments. Although both battalions were forced to give up their individual facing colours on their uniforms – yellow for the 28th Regiment and buff for the 61st Regiment – when the government imposed a standard white across all English and Welsh regiments, the Gloucestershire Regiment never accepted this change for their regimental colours. Both battalions retained their former colours until 1929, when a compromise primrose yellow was finally chosen and a new regimental colour subsequently presented.

The two battalions continued to refer to themselves by their former regimental numbers until they were merged in 1948, when the Gloucestershire Regiment became a single-battalion regiment. The 1st Battalion celebrated the bicentenary of the regiment at Malta in 1894 and the anniversary of the Battle of Alexandria annually. The 2nd Battalion, on the other hand, held games followed by a dinner and a ball on the anniversary of the 61st Regiment's victory at Chillianwallah on 13 January 1849 when overseas, or on the anniversary of that regiment's victory at Salamanca on 22 July 1812 when at home.

The new regiment acquired its march, The Kinnegad Slashers, and its official nickname, Slashers, from the 28th Regiment. The name arose from an incident in 1764, when members of the regiment allegedly slashed off part of the ear of a Montreal magistrate who had been harassing soldiers stationed in the city after the Seven Years' War. The regiment was also sometimes referred to as The Old Braggs, from Colonel Philip Bragg, who commanded the 28th Regiment when it was still named after its colonels. Two other nicknames associated with the new regiment were inherited from the 61st Regiment; The Flowers of Toulouse, from the scarlet uniforms of that regiment's many dead in the Battle of Toulouse, and The Silver-Tailed Dandies, from the silver decorations on the longer-than-normal coat tails of the 61st Regiment's uniform.

== Second Boer War ==
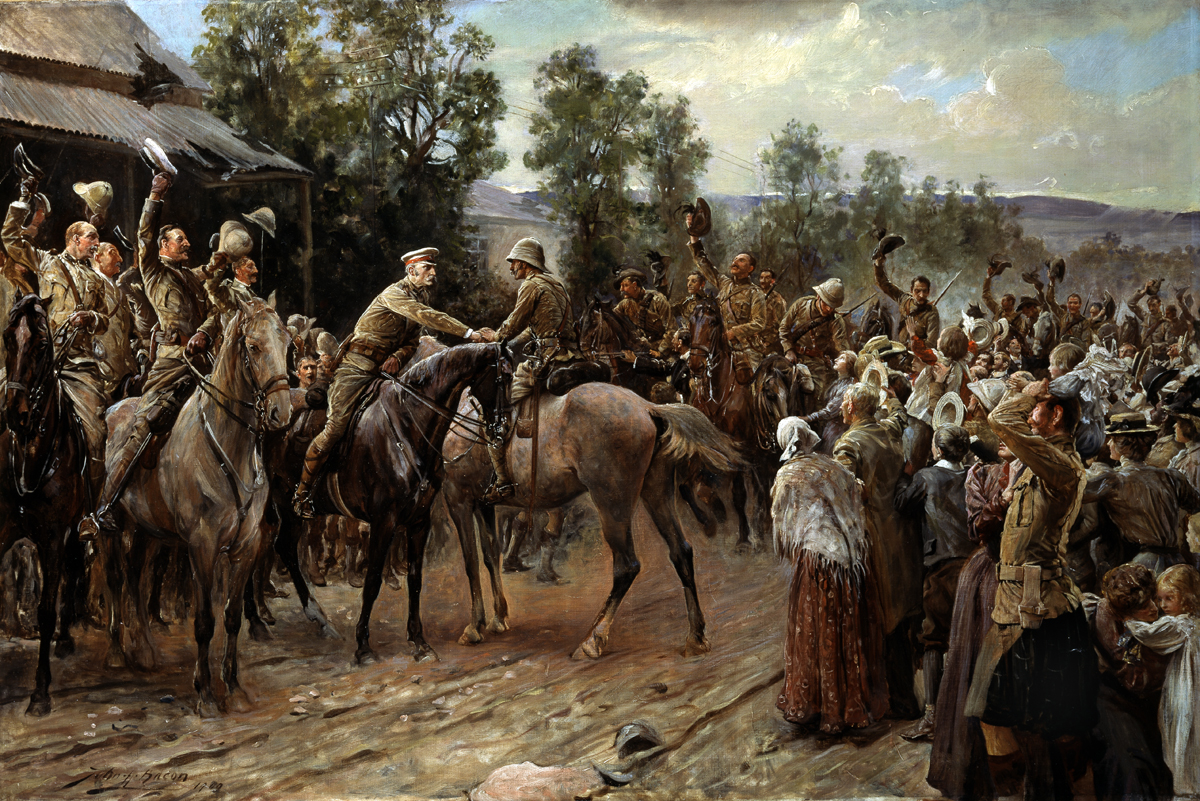
The Relief of Ladysmith by John Henry Frederick Bacon. The Gloucestershire Regiment was blooded at Ladysmith, and the survivors helped defend the city until its relief on 1 March 1900.

The Gloucestershire Regiment began life quietly. The two battalions alternated between postings at home and overseas, mostly in India, but their first action came in 1899 during the Second Boer War. Deployed to Ladysmith, the 1st Battalion was part of a column sent out on 24 October to cover the withdrawal of a brigade after the Battle of Talana Hill. When the column came under fire near Rietfontein, the battalion was detached and ordered forward, but the order was ambiguous and the battalion advanced too far. The troops were caught in the open for several hours before they were able to extricate themselves at the cost of five men killed, including the battalion commander, and 58 wounded.

Five days later, some 450 men of the 1st Battalion were part of a small force tasked with seizing Nicholson's Nek, a pass some 6 miles (10 km) north of Ladysmith, during the Battle of Ladysmith. The troops moved out on the night of 29 October with the intention to be in position before the main battle started, but they left too late to reach their objective before daybreak. As they took up an alternative position on the nearby Tchrengula Hill the pack-mules bolted, taking most of the heavy weaponry and ammunition with them. The Boers discovered the incursion at dawn and surrounded the position, and although the British held out for several hours they were forced to surrender at 12:30. The battalion lost 38 killed and 115 wounded, and the survivors were held as prisoners of war (POWs) in Pretoria.

While the remainder of the 1st Battalion helped in the defence of Ladysmith (the city was eventually relieved on 1 March), the 2nd Battalion deployed to South Africa, arriving in January 1900. The battalion fought in the Battle of Paardeberg, a nine-day battle which ended on 27 February with the capture of the Boer general Piet Cronjé and his force of some 4,000 men. On 15 March, the battalion entered the Boer city of Bloemfontein, where it remained on garrison duties until 1904. The 1st Battalion, re-united when its POWs were liberated after the capture of Pretoria on 5 July, was posted in August 1900 to Ceylon, where it remained until 1903 guarding Boer prisoners of war.

Some of the regiment's auxiliary battalions, which in 1900 were increased in number by the formation of the 3rd Volunteer Battalion, also played a role in the war. On 16 March 1900, a company of 124 officers and men from the 1st and 2nd Volunteer Battalions landed at Cape Town. They served for a year alongside the 2nd Battalion and were replaced by a second volunteer company in April 1901. The 4th (Militia) Battalion, meanwhile, guarded Boer prisoners held on St. Helena. By the war's end the regiment had lost 2 officers and 94 other ranks killed, 13 officers and 201 men wounded, and suffered 250 deaths from sickness. The regiment added 4 new battle honours to its colours: "Defence of Ladysmith"; "Relief of Kimberley"; "Paardeberg"; and "South Africa, 1899–1902"; the last of which was also awarded to the 1st and 2nd Volunteer Battalions.

== First World War ==
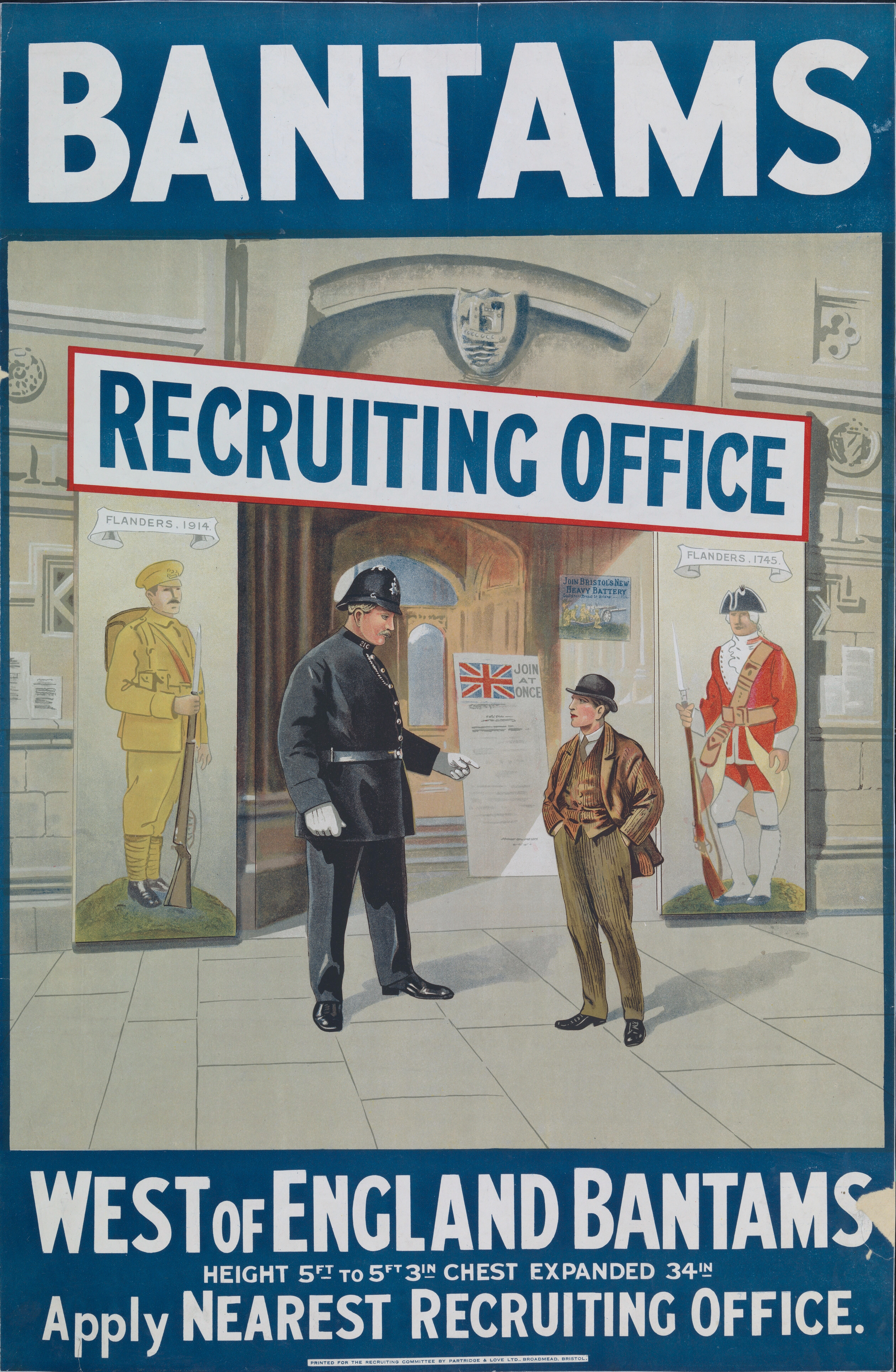
Recruiting poster for the 14th Battalion

Following the Territorial and Reserve Forces Act 1907 – part of the Haldane Reforms that restructured the British Army and converted the militia and volunteer battalions into the Special Reserve and the Territorial Force – the 4th (Militia) Battalion was disbanded, and at the outbreak of the First World War in 1914 the Gloucestershire Regiment comprised:

- 1st Battalion – assigned to the 3rd Brigade in the 1st Division
- 2nd Battalion – deployed to Tianjin, China
- 3rd (Reserve) Battalion, Special Reserve – formerly 3rd (Militia) Battalion
- 4th (City of Bristol) Battalion, Territorial Force – formerly 1st (City of Bristol) Volunteer Battalion
- 5th Battalion, Territorial Force – formerly 2nd Volunteer Battalion
- 6th Battalion, Territorial Force – formerly 3rd Volunteer Battalion

During the war the regiment raised an additional 18 battalions, and in total 16 battalions of the Gloucestershire Regiment saw active service in France and Flanders, Italy, Gallipoli, Egypt, Mesopotamia, Persia and Salonika.

=== Regular Army ===
The 1st Battalion was deployed to France in August 1914 and saw action on the Western Front. It suffered its first casualties at Landrecies on 26 August 1914 during the retreat from Mons, and sustained further losses in September during the First Battle of the Aisne. The battalion entered the First Battle of Ypres on 19 October 1914 with 26 officers and 970 other ranks, played a pivotal role in the defence of Langemarck, was called upon several times to counter-attack against enemy breakthroughs and, by the time of its relief four weeks later, had been reduced to 2 officers and 100 other ranks. In December 1914, it fought in the Defence of Festubert, and the next month in the Defence of Givenchy. Later in 1915, the battalion saw action in the Battle of Aubers Ridge and the Battle of Loos, and it was active during the Somme offensive in 1916 during the Battles of Bazentin and Pozières, and in an attack on High Wood.

The fire from the ditch was so intense that practically all the bayonets in the trench were broken. When hit by bullets they snapped like glass and the fragments were responsible for 7 head and neck wounds. 2 of which were serious.

— Private Barton, 1st Battalion
Battle of Langemarck
October 1914

Early in 1917, the 1st Division moved south of the Somme, and the 1st Battalion participated in the advance to the Hindenburg Line. In July, the division was allocated to Operation Hush, a planned seaborne invasion that was later cancelled, and the only significant action the 1st Battalion saw in 1917 was in November, on the last day of the Second Battle of Passchendaele. On 18 April 1918, during the Battle of Béthune, an engagement in the Battle of the Lys, the battalion earned high praise and 33 awards for gallantry when it repulsed an attack by four enemy regiments that had turned the Glosters' flank and, in echoes of the Battle of Alexandria, forced them to fight back to back. The battalion saw action again in September and October on the Hindenburg Line in the Battles of Épehy and St Quentin Canal. The 1st Battalion saw its last action of the war on 4 November 1918 in the Battle of the Sambre, where it helped capture Catillon and the crossing over the Sambre canal, some 4 miles (6 km) from the scene of its first casualties over four years previously.

The 2nd Battalion returned from Tianjin in November 1914 and landed in France the next month as part of the 81st Brigade in the 27th Division. Its first significant action came in May 1915 during the Second Battle of Ypres – the only German offensive on the Western Front that year – in which the battalion held its ground, though at the cost of 505 casualties. At the end of 1915, the 27th Division was transferred to XVI Corps of the British Salonika Army on the Macedonian front, and the 2nd Battalion occupied positions west of Lake Beshik (modern day Lake Volvi, Greece). In July 1916, XVI Corps took over the line of the River Struma, and for the next two years the battalion was involved in operations along the Struma valley, from November 1916 as part of the 82nd Brigade. It was a relatively quiet sector, and although the battalion was involved in attacks across the Struma in September, October and December 1916 – the last costing the battalion 114 casualties – and conducted a number of raids in 1917, sickness was more of a threat than enemy action. In July 1918, the 27th Division was transferred to XII Corps south-west of Dojran, and the capture of the Roche Noire salient on 1 September, at a cost of 89 casualties, was the last action of the 2nd Battalion in the war.

=== Special Reserve ===
The Special Reserve mobilised for their twin tasks of home defence and organising Reservists, Special Reservists and later new recruits as reinforcements for the Regular battalions serving overseas. 3rd (Reserve) Battalion served in the Thames–Medway Garrison for the whole war. It also formed the 11th (Reserve) Battalion to carry out the same reinforcement role for the 'Kitchener's Army' battalions. In 1916 it became part of the Training Reserve, but the training staff retained their Glosters badges.

=== Territorial Force ===
Smith, poor fellow, has died of wounds. I passed him on his way down – though hit in seven places, his courage was wonderful. I asked him how he felt & he said with a smile "There is some lead in me which ought not to be there & I am afraid I have done in your tunic. I am awfully sorry".

— Captain L. Cameron Nott, 1/6th Battalion
the Somme 1916

Each of the Territorial Force battalions volunteered for service overseas and raised a second battalion, the six battalions being numbered 1/4th, 2/4th, 1/5th, 2/5th, 1/6th, and 2/6th. The original territorial battalions also raised a third battalion each in 1915 as home-based reserves, though in 1916 these were merged to form the 4th (City of Bristol) Reserve Battalion. Another home-based territorial battalion, the 17th, was raised in 1917.

==== First-line territorials ====
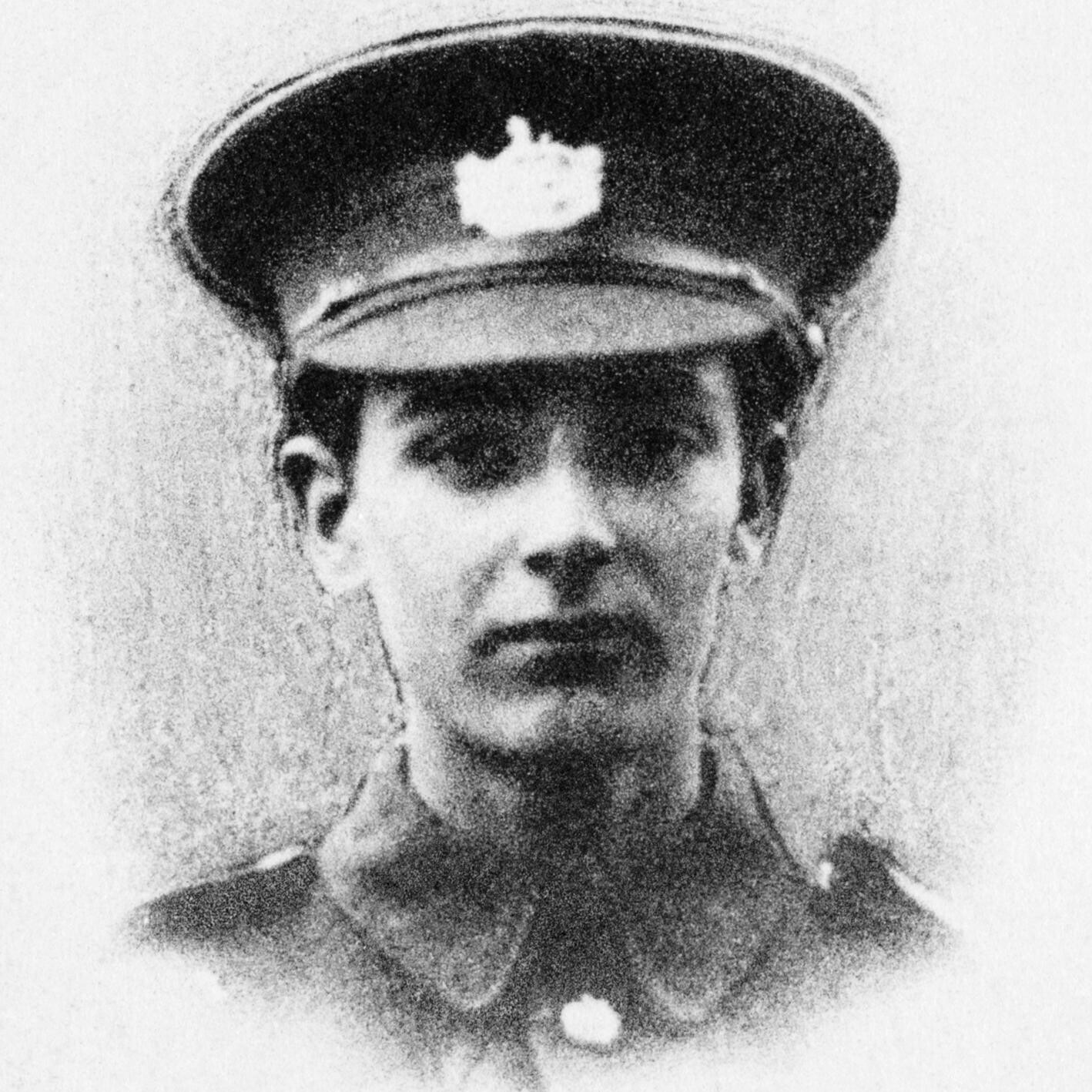
A soldier of Gloucestershire. Private Neale, D Company 1/5th Battalion. Reported missing 16 August 1916.

The first-line territorials proceeded to France in March 1915 as part of the 48th (South Midland) Division; the 1/4th and 1/6th Battalions in the 144th Brigade, and the 1/5th Battalion in the 145th Brigade. Their first significant experience of battle came during the Somme offensive; on 16 July, during the Battle of Bazentin, the 1/4th Battalion fought north of Ovillers, and the 1/5th and 1/6th Battalions went into action in the same area on 20 and 21 July respectively. They returned to the area during the Battle of Pozières and fought a number of actions between 13 and 27 August. In February 1917, the 48th Division moved to positions opposite Péronne, and the territorials saw action in March and April during the general advance that followed the German withdrawal to the Hindenburg Line. The division moved again in July, to Ypres, where the territorials fought in engagements of the Battle of Passchendaele; the 1/5th Battalion in the Battle of Langemarck and the Battle of Broodseinde, and the 1/4th and 1/6th Battalions in the action of 22 August 1917 and the Battle of Poelcappelle. Total losses to the three battalions at Passchendaele numbered 1,186 men.

In December 1917, the 48th Division transferred to Italy, where the battalions were weakened by an outbreak of influenza. In June 1918, the 1/5th and 1/6th Battalions were in action during the Second Battle of the Piave River, and the 1/4th and 1/6th Battalions fought their last actions of the war in the Battle of Vittorio Veneto at the beginning of November. Meanwhile, the 1/5th Battalion was transferred in September 1918 to the 75th Brigade of the 25th Division and returned to France. In October, it fought in the capture of the Beaurevoir Line during the Battle of St Quentin Canal, and in the Battle of the Selle. During the latter, the battalion was held up for nearly four hours until Private Francis George Miles went forward alone and knocked out two enemy machine-gun positions, for which action he was awarded the Victoria Cross (VC). The final action of the 1/5th Battalion came in November, during the Battle of the Sambre.

==== Second-line territorials ====
The second-line territorials were raised in September 1914 and remained in the UK until they moved to France in May 1916 as part of 61st (2nd South Midland) Division; the 2/4th and 2/6th Battalions in 183rd Brigade, and the 2/5th Battalion in the 184th Brigade. The three battalions completed tours in the front line around Neuve Chapelle, but for the 2/4th and 2/6th Battalions the first significant action was on 19 July 1916 in a costly and unsuccessful attack in the Battle of Fromelles which cost the two battalions a total of 332 casualties. In March and April 1917, the three battalions saw action in the advance to the Hindenburg Line south of the Somme. The 61st Division moved to Ypres in July, and all three battalions fought near Gheluvelt in the Battle of Passchendaele the following month, when the 2/4th Battalion suffered particularly badly with over 200 casualties. In early December, during the Battle of Cambrai, a heavy German counter-attack forced both the 2/4th and 2/6th Battalions out of their positions in the front line at La Vacquerie, 7.5 miles (12 km) south-west of Cambrai, reducing the 2/4th Battalion to two companies and inflicting casualties of 16 officers and 308 other ranks on the 2/6th Battalion.

In February 1918, the 2/4th and 2/6th Battalions were disbanded and their men distributed to the 2/5th Battalion and the 24th Entrenching Battalion. At the end of March, 10 days of fighting, retreating and digging-in near St. Quentin reduced the 2/5th Battalion to 150 men during Operation Michael, the opening phase of the German spring offensive. The 61st Division was transferred north to help reinforce First Army in April, and the 2/5th Battalion fought a number of actions south-west of Merville during the Battle of the Lys. In August, the battalion attempted to force a bridgehead across a stream in Nieppe Forest, west of Merville, and fought on 1 September during the advance to the River Lys. The battalion was in battle again on 30 September at Fleurbaix, south-west of Armentières, and saw its last action of the war on 1 and 2 November during the Battle of Valenciennes.

=== New Army ===
As volunteers answered Lord Kitchener's call to arms, ten New Army battalions, the 7th to the 16th, were added to the regiment's establishment between 1914 and 1916. Three of them, the 11th, 15th and 16th, were home-based reserve battalions which later transferred to the Training Reserve.

==== 7th Battalion ====
The 7th Battalion was formed in Bristol in August 1914. It sailed to the island of Lemnos in June 1915 as part of the 39th Brigade in the 13th (Western) Division and went into the line at Gallipoli the next month. The battalion fought its first action on 8 August in the Battle of Chunuk Bair, during which it suffered over 820 casualties, including all of its officers, warrant officers and senior non-commissioned officers. It was brought back up to strength and moved to Egypt in January 1916. In March, the 13th Division was transferred to Mesopotamia, but on landing at Basra the battalion was put out of action by an outbreak of relapsing fever. It rejoined the division in the middle of April and fought in the unsuccessful attempt to lift the siege of Kut. The battalion saw action in December 1916 and February 1917 during the subsequent advance on and capture of Kut, and fought its last battle on 29 March 1917 during the Samarra offensive. It spent the next 15 months mostly on defensive and garrison duties and was disbanded in September 1919.

==== 8th Battalion ====
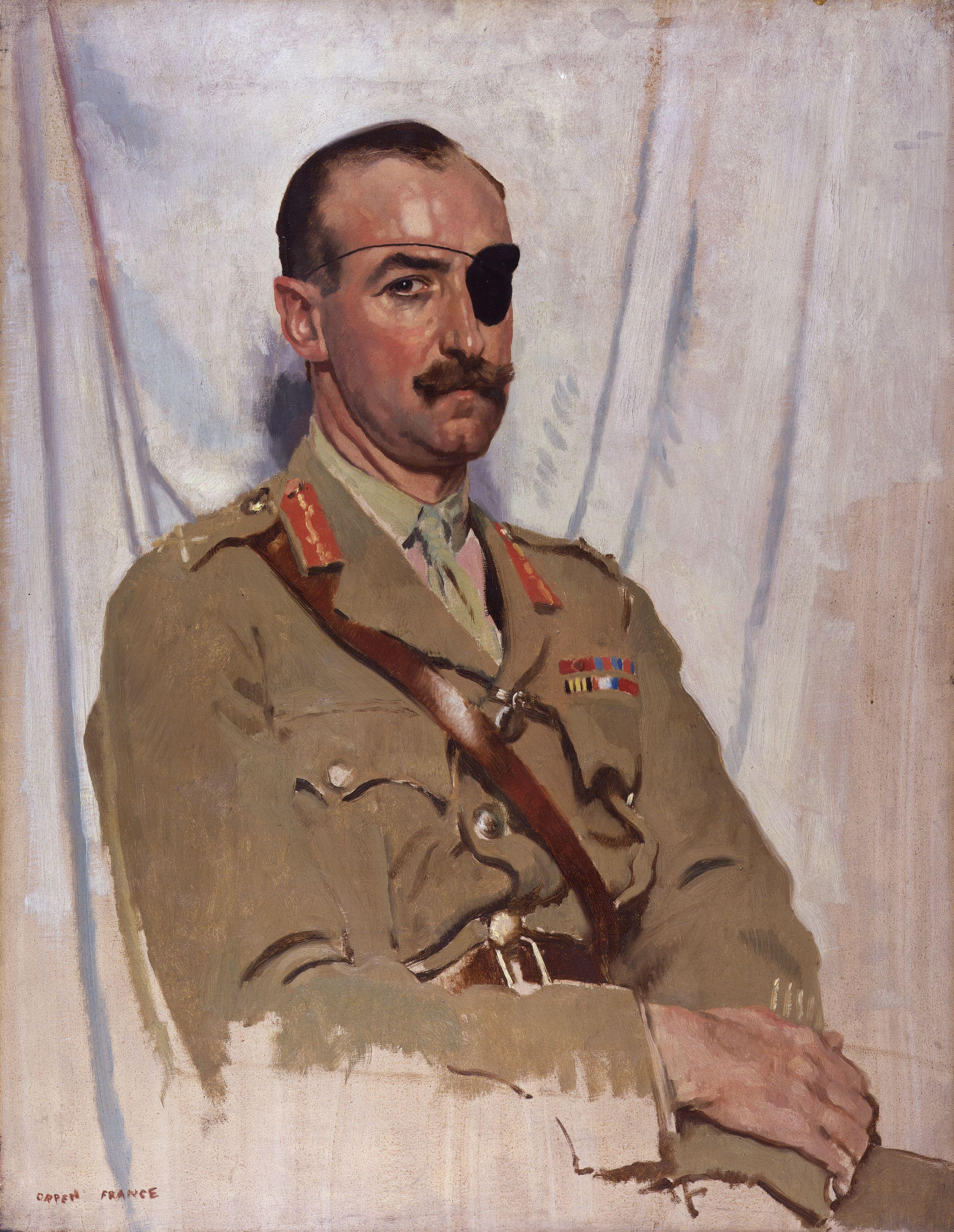
Sir Adrian Carton de Wiart, who won the Victoria Cross while commanding officer of the 8th Battalion Gloucestershire Regiment

The 8th Battalion was raised in Bristol in September 1914. It arrived in France in July 1915 as part of the 57th Brigade in the 19th (Western) Division and saw its first action the next year during the Battle of Albert, in which it helped capture La Boisselle. The division's 58th Brigade had captured the western half of the village on 2 July, and the 8th Battalion North Staffordshire Regiment and 10th Battalion Worcestershire Regiment, both of the 57th Brigade, assisted in the capture of the rest of the village the next day. A German counter-attack regained the eastern half of the village, and the 8th Glosters suffered 302 casualties when it fought alongside the 10th Battalion Royal Warwickshire Regiment to help retake it. During the battle, the Glosters' commanding officer, Lieutenant-Colonel Adrian Carton de Wiart, assumed command of all four 57th Brigade battalions when the other three commanding officers became casualties, and for his actions in averting a serious reverse he was awarded the VC. Later the same month, during the Battle of Pozières, the battalion made two unsuccessful attacks against the German line east of the village which together cost it 374 casualties, among whom were Carton de Wiart and his successor, Major Lord A.G. Thynne, both wounded. On 18 November, the last day of the Somme offensive, the battalion suffered 295 casualties when it captured Grandcourt during the Battle of the Ancre.

In 1917, the 8th Battalion saw action in June during the Battle of Messines, fought two minor actions in July near Oosttaverne, south of Ypres, and was involved in the Battle of the Menin Road Ridge in August. The battalion was next in action on the evening of 21 March 1918, the first day of the German Spring Offensive, when the Germans captured Doignies. Unable to recapture the village, the battalion blocked any further enemy progress until the morning of 23 March, when German forces broke through on the left and threatened to outflank it. Company A fought to the last man covering the battalion's withdrawal, for which action the company commander, Captain Manley Angell James, was awarded the VC. By the time the 19th Division withdrew to Doullens on 28 March the battalion had suffered 323 casualties. In April, the battalion fought in three engagements of the Battle of the Lys: the Battles of Messines, Bailleul and First Kemmel. The following month, the 19th Division's parent unit, IX Corps, was transferred to the French Sixth Army. The division was supposed to rest and re-organise in a quiet sector, but on 27 May the Germans launched a major attack, ensnaring the 8th Battalion in the Third Battle of the Aisne. The battalion saw its last action in October, during the Battle of the Selle, and was disbanded in May 1919.

==== 9th Battalion ====
The 9th Battalion was formed in Bristol in September 1914 and reached France in September 1915 as part of the 78th Brigade in the 26th Division. The division was transferred to XII Corps of the British Salonika Army in November 1915, and the battalion held the line around Tumba, north of Salonika, until July 1916, when the division relieved the French south of Lake Dojran. The battalion participated in two attacks against the Bulgarian lines, on 25 April and 8 May 1917, during the Battle of Dojran. In July 1918, the battalion was transferred to the 198th Brigade of the 66th Division in France, becoming the divisional pioneers, and was disbanded in November 1919.

==== 10th Battalion ====
My word, as soon as the order was given the Gloucesters were out and over the parapet and soon doing great havoc among the Germans.

— Unnamed lance-corporal, 10th Battalion
Battle of Loos

The 10th Battalion was raised in September 1914 in Bristol, but was recruited mainly by volunteers from Cheltenham. It crossed to France in August 1915 and replaced one of the Guards battalions in the 1st Brigade of the 1st Division. It saw its first action on 25 September during the Battle of Loos when, as one of the brigade's assault battalions, it succeeded in carrying the German front line at the cost of all but 60 of its men. On 23 July 1916, during the Battle of Pozières, the battalion attacked the German line east of the village, and was involved in two further attacks in the same area in August, all without success. The battalion's last action of the war came on 9 September, in a failed attack on High Wood which cost it 122 casualties. In 1917, the 1st Division was allocated to Operation Hush, and when that was cancelled the 10th battalion moved to the Ypres area. It was disbanded in February 1918 and its men distributed among the regiment's 1st and 8th Battalions and the 13th Entrenching Battalion.

==== 12th Battalion (Bristol's Own) ====
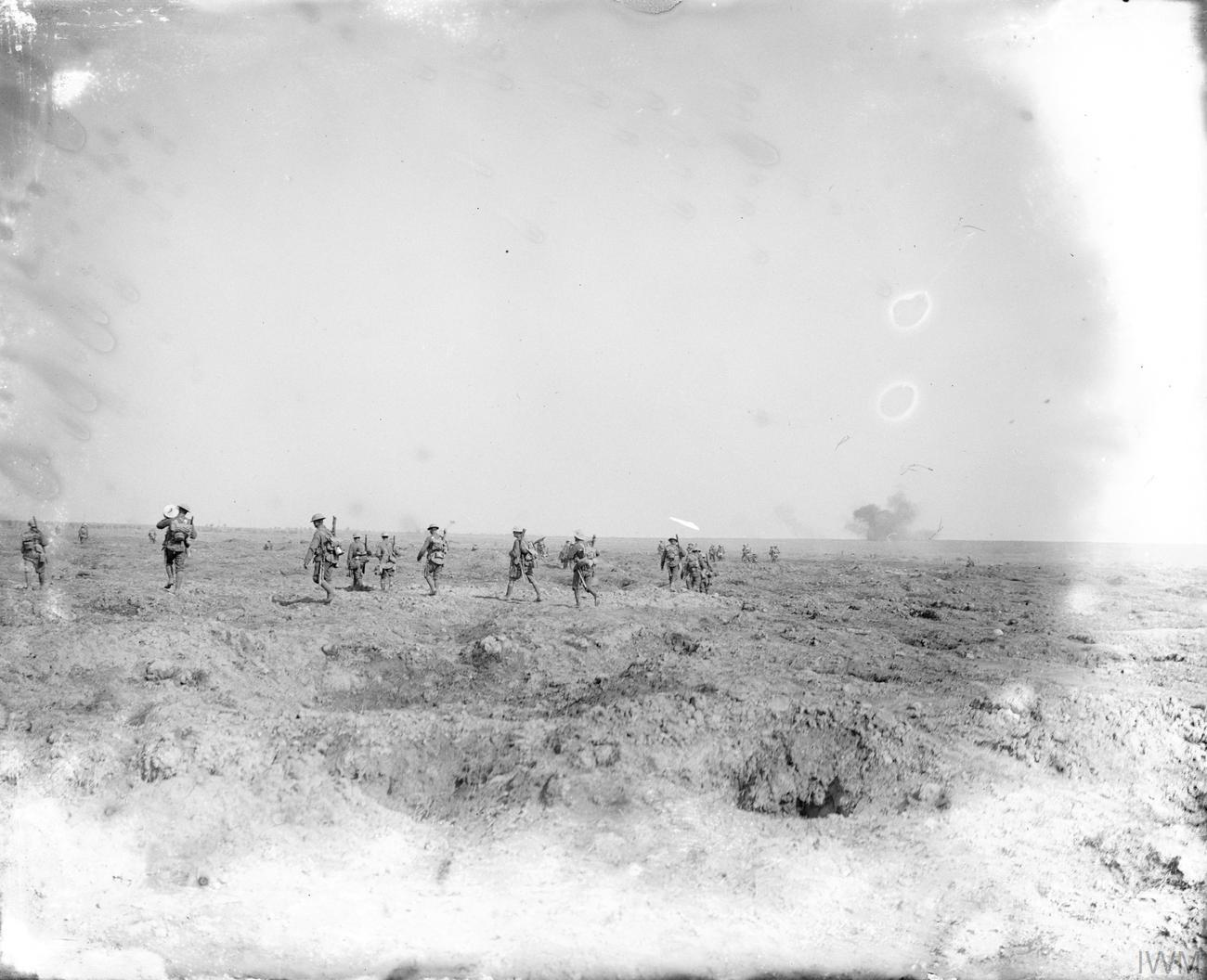
12th Battalion troops move up during the Battle of Morval

The 12th Battalion was raised in Bristol in August 1914 by the Citizen's Recruiting Committee. It was taken over by the War Office in June 1915 and left for France in November as part of the 95th Brigade in the 5th Division. The battalion went into action in 1916 during the Somme offensive: on 29 July at Longueval during the Battle of Delville Wood; between 3 and 5 September during the Battle of Guillemont, in which it suffered some 300 casualties; and on 25 September during the Battle of Morval. On 8 May 1917, during the Battle of Arras, the battalion was practically annihilated with the loss of 296 men at Fresnoy, and it did not see action again until 4 October in the Battle of Broodseinde. In December, the 5th Division was transferred to Italy, where it went into the line along the River Piave, but the battalion saw little action beyond patrolling. The division returned to France in April 1918, occupying positions in the line near Nieppe Forest, and the battalion saw action on 25 April and 28 June, both times successfully advancing the front line. Its last action came during the Second Battle of Bapaume, where it suffered some 100 casualties on 21 August but succeeded in capturing Irles on 23 August. On 6 October, the battalion was disbanded and its men distributed among the other units of the 5th Division.

==== 13th Battalion (Forest of Dean) ====
The 13th Battalion was raised in December 1914 at Malvern by Sir Henry Webb and recruited from the miners of the Forest of Dean, South Wales and the Durham coalfields. In July 1915, it was taken over by the War Office and went to France in March 1916 as divisional pioneers to the 39th Division. The battalion saw its first significant action on 30 June 1916, during the Battle of the Boar's Head, when it dug communication trenches behind the assaulting troops. On several occasions during the battle the pioneers had to stop digging to defend themselves, and the battalion suffered 71 casualties. It saw action again towards the end of 1916 during operations on the Ancre, including the Battle of the Ancre Heights and the Battle of the Ancre. In March 1918, the battalion suffered particularly badly in the opening week of the Spring Offensive, during which it was required to take positions in the line as infantry, and by the time the division was withdrawn on 31 March the battalion had sustained 326 casualties. In April, the survivors were allocated to composite infantry battalions and saw their last action on 26 April during the Second Battle of Kemmel, part of the Battle of the Lys, after which the battalion was reduced to a training cadre.

==== 14th Battalion (West of England) ====
The 14th Battalion was a bantam unit of volunteers from Bristol and Birmingham who had previously been rejected for service because of their short height. It was raised in April 1915 by the Citizen's Recruiting Committee, adopted by the War Office in June 1915, and departed for France in January 1916 as part of the 105th Brigade in the 35th Division. The battalion went into the line in March, where the men's first task was to raise the height of the firing step, and its first significant action came on 8 June, when it conducted a large raid south-east of Neuve Chapelle. In July, following the capture of Trônes Wood by the 18th Division during the Battle of Bazentin, the battalion moved into the line at the northern end of the wood where, on 19 July, it suffered 107 casualties to enemy artillery. On 21 August 1917, while in the line near Épehy, the Germans attacked one of the battalion's bombing posts. Although his bombing party were driven back, Second-Lieutenant Hardy Falconer Parsons remained and prevented the enemy from entering the trenches, for which act he was posthumously awarded the VC. The battalion fought in the action of 22 October 1917 during the Battle of Passchendaele, and saw its last action on 4 February 1918, when it successfully attacked a fortified farm in the Ypres sector. Seven days later the battalion was disbanded and its men transferred to the 13th Battalion.

==== 18th Battalion ====
The 18th battalion was raised in 1918 from a cadre of the 5th Battalion Oxfordshire and Buckinghamshire Light Infantry, and decamped to France in August 1918 as part of the 49th Brigade in the 16th Division. It went into action on 11 September, when it successfully assaulted the Railway Triangle west of Auchy, and saw its last action on 18 September, when a German attack drove A Company from its forward posts. The battalion was disbanded in June 1919.

=== Fifth Gloucester Gazette ===
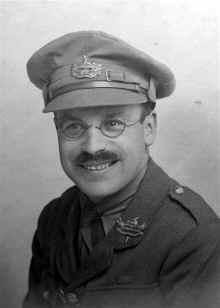
Lieutenant F. W. Harvey DCM

The Fifth Gloucester Gazette was a trench journal published from the front lines by the men of the 1/5th Battalion. The first issue appeared on 12 April 1915 and foreshadowed more famous trench journals such as The Wipers Times. It ran for 25 issues, the last of which appeared in January 1919. After the war it was republished as a compilation titled The Fifth Gloucester Gazette a chronicle, serious and humorous, of the Battalion while serving with the British Expeditionary Force. The gazette featured jokes, poetry, short stories, news and satirical adverts. In October 1916 The Times Literary Supplement hailed it as "the oldest and most literary of the British trench journals".

The gazette was regarded so highly due in part to the efforts of famous war poet and founding contributor F. W. Harvey, who published 77 poems in it while serving with the 1/5th. (Note: In September 1916 Harvey's work was published as a collection in its own right, titled A Gloucestershire Lad at Home and Abroad, though by this time Harvey was already a month into his captivity, having been taken prisoner on 17 August. Harvey continued to write from the prison camps, and a second collection of his poetry, titled Gloucestershire Friends: Poems from a German Prison Camp, having been forwarded by his captors, was published in September 1917.) Five of Harvey's poems were included in the 1917 anthology of war poetry, The Muse in Arms, alongside poems by Siegfried Sassoon, Robert Graves and Rupert Brooke. The anthology also featured the poetry of Lieutenant Cyril Winterbotham – who served in the 1/5th Battalion and edited the gazette until he was killed in action on 27 August 1916 – and Harvey's pre-war friend Ivor Gurney, who served in the 2/5th Battalion.

=== War's end ===
All second-line territorial and New Army battalions had been disbanded and the regiment returned to its pre-war establishment by the end of 1919. Close to 40,000 men are believed to have fought with the regiment in the war, of which 8,100 lost their lives, and the regiment was awarded 72 different battle honours. The regular battalions lost 1,400 men killed, 1,044 of them from the 1st Battalion, and were awarded 39 battle honours. The territorial battalions lost 2,542 men killed and received 60 battle honours, and the New Army battalions suffered 3,954 deaths and won 84 battle honours. Home-based reserve battalions and the regimental depot accounted for 204 deaths. Four awards of the VC were made to men serving with the regiment during the war, along with 47 Distinguished Service Orders (DSO), 188 Distinguished Conduct Medals (DCM), 265 Military Crosses (MC) and 747 Military Medals (MM). A fifth VC was awarded to an officer of the regiment attached to another unit.

== Inter-war years ==
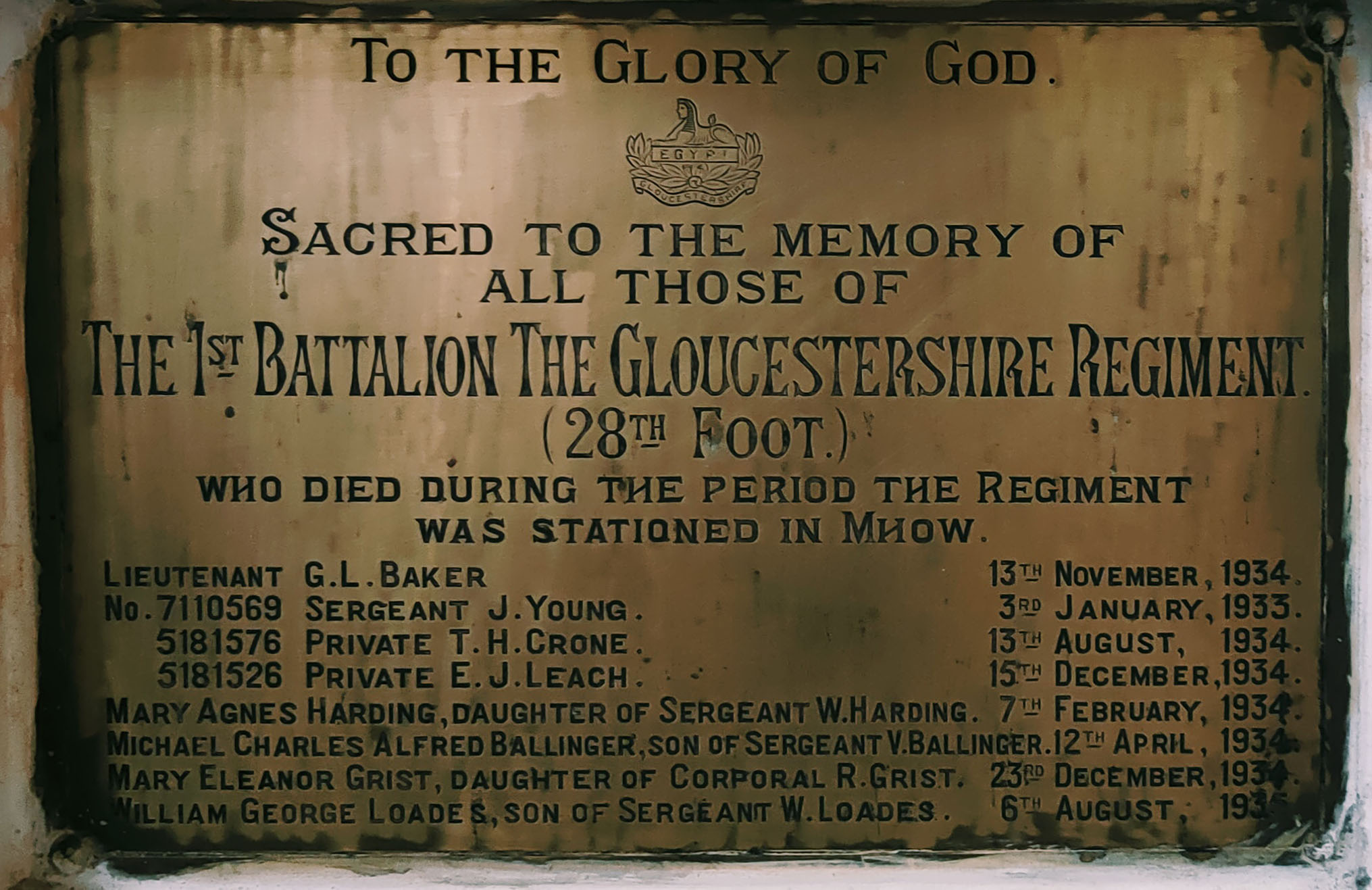
The 1st Battalion The Gloucestershire Regiment (28th Foot) was stationed at Mhow Cantonment from 1934 to 1936, during which this plaque was installed at Christ Church, Mhow.

After the end of the First World War, the regiment resumed alternate postings home and abroad. The 1st Battalion completed tours of duty in Ireland, where it captured the Irish republican Seán Moylan, and Germany, which counted as a home posting, and returned to the UK in 1923. Meanwhile, the 2nd Battalion was posted to India, with a five-month interlude in Shanghai at short notice from February 1927 when warring Chinese factions threatened the Shanghai International Settlement. In 1928, the 2nd Battalion returned to the UK and the 1st Battalion was posted overseas, serving three years in Egypt, a year in Singapore and six years in India before ending up in Burma in 1938. Prompted by concerns of an Italian invasion following the Second Italo-Ethiopian War, the 2nd Battalion was sent at short notice to Egypt in January 1936, returning to the UK in January 1937. The following year, the 5th Battalion became the regiment's sole territorial unit when the 4th Battalion was converted to the 66th (Gloucesters) Searchlight Regiment, Royal Artillery (RA), and the 6th Battalion converted to the 44th Battalion, Royal Tank Regiment. On the eve of the Second World War, the Territorial Army (TA), as the Territorial Force had been renamed, was doubled in size, and the 7th Battalion was created in August 1939 as the second-line duplicate of the 5th Battalion.

== Second World War ==
On the outbreak of the Second World War in 1939, the Gloucestershire Regiment comprised:

- 1st Battalion – stationed around Rangoon in Burma
- 2nd Battalion – assigned to the 8th Infantry Brigade in the 3rd Division
- 5th Battalion (TA) – assigned to the 144th Infantry Brigade in the 48th Division
- 7th Battalion (TA) – assigned to the 183rd Infantry Brigade in the 61st Division

=== Battle of France ===
Completely surrounded, with our lack of weapons there was only one thing to do. The men were utterly exhausted from fatigue, lack of sleep and food and seventeen days of continuous fighting or marching. We were prisoners.

— Captain Wilson, 2nd Battalion
France 1940

The 2nd Battalion deployed to France on 2 October 1939 and was transferred to the 145th Brigade in the 48th Division in March 1940. This brought it alongside the 5th Battalion in the division's 144th Brigade, which had arrived in France on 15 January 1940. In May 1940, during the Battle of France, the German breakthrough at Sedan precipitated a retreat to Dunkirk. The 5th Battalion marched 95 miles (150 km) in 83 hours with little food or sleep before eventually picking up transport at Tournai where, on 19 May, the 2nd Battalion lost 194 men killed or missing in a matter of minutes to an airstrike. The regiment gained some respite on 20 May, when the two battalions held positions along the River Escaut (Scheldt) for two days before the British Expeditionary Force resumed its retreat. On 25 May, the 2nd Battalion, having by now suffered 219 casualties, became part of Somer Force. This mixed group of units under the command of Brigadier Nigel Somerset, until recently the 2nd Battalion commanding officer, fortified Cassel on the outer perimeter around Dunkirk. The Germans probed the town the next day and began assaulting it on 27 May. Somer Force held out for two days, eventually attempting to withdraw under orders on the evening of 29 May, but few made it to Dunkirk. The 2nd Battalion suffered 678 casualties at Cassel, 484 of them POWs. Meanwhile, the 5th Battalion was given a similar task at the villages of Arneke and Ledringhem, some 4 miles (6 km) north-west of Cassel. The battalion took up positions on 26 May, and the first attacks came the next day. By 28 May, the battalion had concentrated at Ledringhem, where it was surrounded, and it withdrew under orders in the early hours of 29 May. The survivors reached Bray Dunes before dawn the next day and were subsequently taken off the beach by little ships. The stand at Ledringham had cost the battalion 87 killed, and when it reassembled in the UK it was 400 strong.

=== Retreat from Rangoon ===
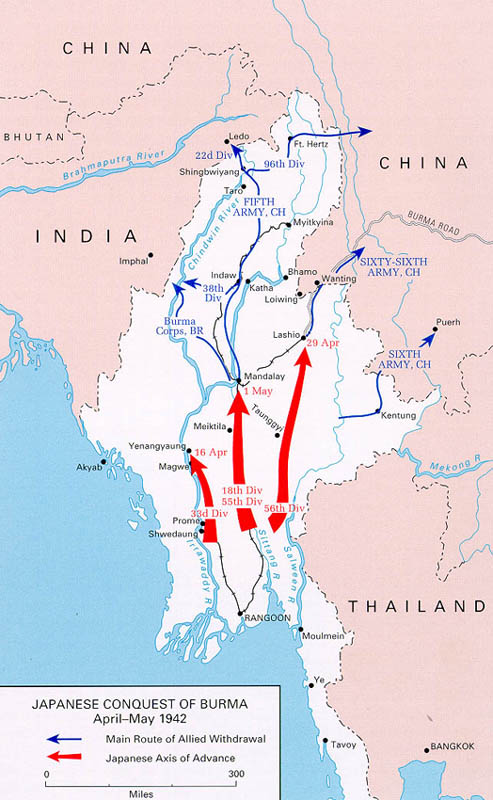
Japanese Conquest of Burma April–May 1942

In March 1942, the 1st Battalion provided the rearguard for the British retreat from Rangoon during the Japanese conquest of Burma. It saw its first significant action of the war on 7 and 8 March at the Taukkyan Roadblock, and for the rest of the month operated independently to cover the retreat, fighting battles at Letpadan on 17 March and Paungde on 27 March. In a subsequent battle near Padigong, 5 miles (8 km) from Paungde, D Company became isolated for 17 hours and had to fight its way back to the battalion at Shwedaung. In the meantime, the battalion became part of the 63rd Indian Infantry Brigade in the 17th Infantry Division, which had to fight its way to and through Shwedaung when Japanese forces infiltrated between the rearguard and the main column. By the end of March, the 1st Battalion had been reduced to 140 all ranks, its commanding officer, Lieutenant-Colonel Charles Bagot, among the wounded.

In mid-April, the under-strength battalion became so dispersed while protecting demolition parties at oil installations around Yenangyaung and Chauk that when Bagot returned from hospital he was informed the battalion had ceased to exist. He was nevertheless able to gather the remnants, now numbering 7 officers and 170 other ranks, at Shwebo on 27 April, and the battalion was subsequently reinforced by a draft of 3 officers and 120 other ranks. When the Japanese threatened Monywa, Bagot took command of all the troops in the area, which included the 1st Battalion, to form Bagot Force. This mixed group of units fought a delaying action at Budalin, 40 miles (60 km) north of Monywa, on 4 May before withdrawing to Ye-u. The battalion continued to act as rearguard, crossing the River Chindwin at Kalewa on 9 May and into India at Tamu at the end of the month. At the same time, the Japanese halted operations in Burma. Since the start of the retreat from Rangoon on 7 March the battalion had lost 8 officers and 156 other ranks killed in action or died of sickness, and many more wounded. The battalion was rested and brought back up to strength in India, where it spent the remainder of the war, and saw no further action.

=== Home front ===
On its return to the UK, the 5th Battalion was brought back up to strength and manned coastal defences in Cornwall. It converted to a reconnaissance role in June 1941, becoming the 43rd (Wessex) Reconnaissance Regiment on 14 October 1941 and ceasing to have any affiliation with the Gloucestershire Regiment. Its duplicate, the 7th Battalion, was posted to Northern Ireland, but saw no action and became a training unit in 1944. With so many of its men languishing in POW camps, the 2nd Battalion was rebuilt and served in home defence at various locations around the UK, finally ending up in 1943 on the Isle of Wight before being assigned to a more active role.

As the UK braced itself for Operation Sea Lion, the German plan to invade, a number of home defence battalions were raised under the regiment's colours. The 8th Battalion was formed from the National Defence Companies and consisted of men too old, too young or unfit for active service, and the younger contingent from this battalion later formed the 70th Battalion. The 9th and 10th Battalions were also raised, the former serving in Northern Ireland, the latter in south Wales and then Lincolnshire. The 11th Battalion was created in October 1940 from a re-designation of the 50th (Holding) Battalion, and 32,000 men in 19 battalions of the Home Guard wore the badges of the regiment. As the threat of invasion receded, most of these home defence battalions were disbanded, the 8th and 70th in 1942, the 9th in 1943, and the Home Guard in 1945. In February 1942, the 11th Battalion ceased to have any affiliation with the regiment when it was converted into 118th Light Anti-Aircraft Regiment, Royal Artillery. The 10th Battalion was converted to armour in 1942 and became the 159th Regiment in the Royal Armoured Corps, though it retained the Glosters' cap badges. It was sent to India in October where, in March 1943, it converted back to infantry and reverted to the regiment's 10th Battalion.

=== Normandy landings and North-West Europe ===
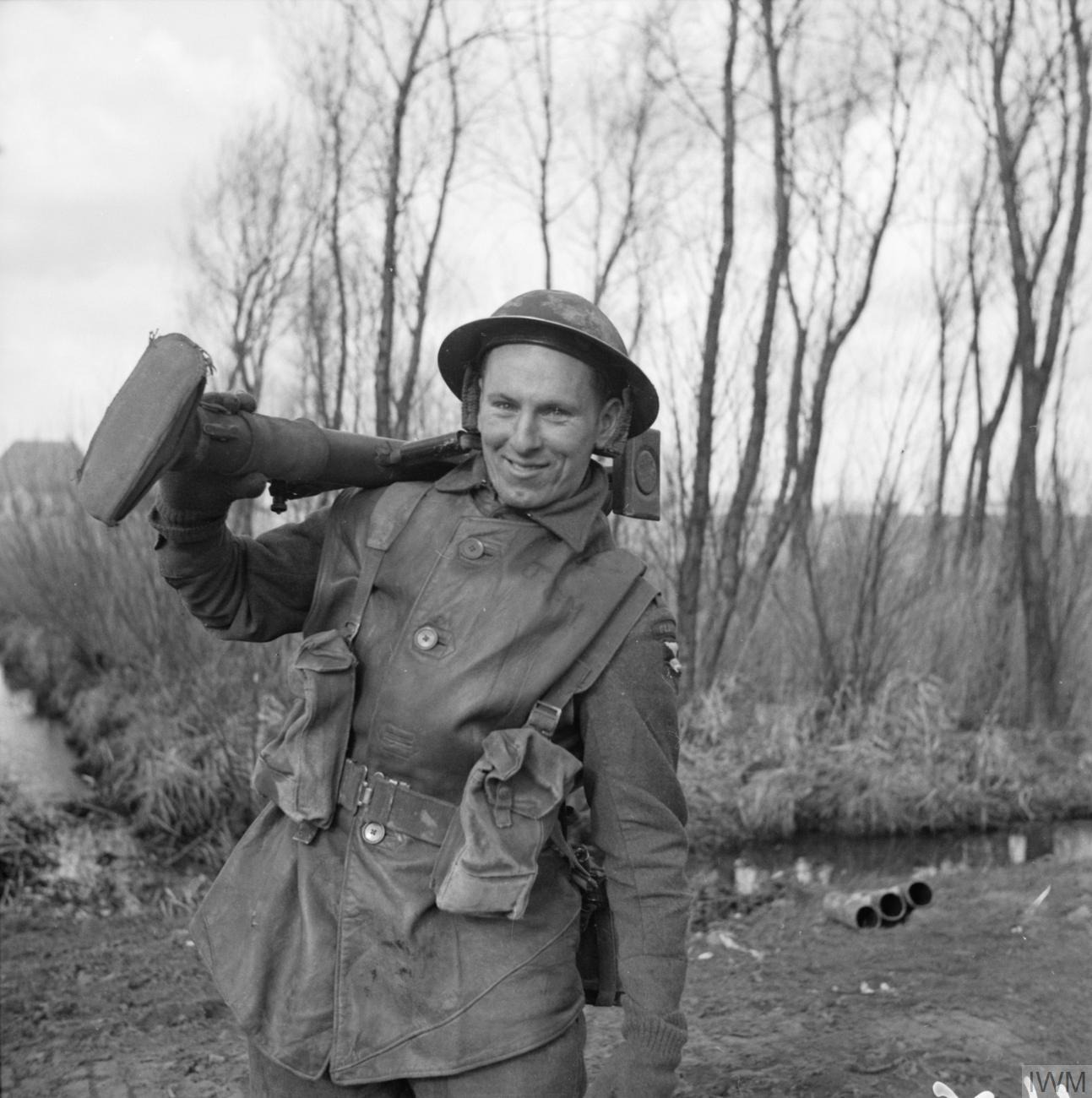
A soldier of Gloucestershire. Private G. Mills of the 2nd Battalion, 6 March 1945.

In 1944, the 2nd Battalion was transferred to the 56th Independent Infantry Brigade, and at 11:00 on 6 June, during the Normandy landings, the brigade landed without incident in the second wave at Gold Beach. The battalion saw action in the Battle of Normandy: at Tilly-sur-Seulles on 11 June during Operation Perch; along the Saint-Germain d'Ectot ridge on 30 July during Operation Bluecoat; and at Thury-Harcourt on 12 August in the prelude to Operation Tractable. In mid-August, having variously served under the commands of the 50th (Northumbrian) Infantry Division, the 7th Armoured Division and the 59th (Staffordshire) Infantry Division, the 56th Brigade came under command of the 49th (West Riding) Infantry Division, with which it remained for the rest of the war. During the advance to the River Seine, the 2nd Battalion suffered 53 casualties capturing Épaignes on 25 August, and crossed the river at Rouen on 2 September. It spearheaded the assault on Le Havre eight days later, and it was the first British unit to enter the city's fort, on 12 September, capturing 1,500 prisoners and much beer for the loss during the battle of 40 men killed and wounded.

From Le Havre, the 2nd Battalion advanced into Belgium, seeing action in the bridgehead across the Turnhout-Antwerp Canal, and the Netherlands, where it fought at Stampersgat. The battalion reached Nijmegen in late November, where it spent over four relatively quiet months interrupted only by a four-day battle at Zetten in January 1945. The battalion's last significant action of the war came on 12 April, when it assaulted across the River Ijssel at Arnhem, after which the rest of the 56th Brigade passed through to capture the town itself. Following the German surrender on 8 May, the 2nd Battalion entered Germany near Osnabrück. It provided a detachment for the British guard at the Nuremberg trials, and in August it was transferred to the 5th Guards Brigade stationed in Berlin. Between the Normandy landings on 6 June 1944 and VE Day on 8 May 1945 the battalion suffered 718 casualties. Among them was the battalion commander, Lieutenant-Colonel Francis Butterworth, died of wounds received during the attack at Stampersgat and succeeded by Lieutenant-Colonel Robert Bray.

=== Burma Campaign 1944–45 ===
On reverting to the infantry role, the 10th Battalion was assigned to the 72nd Brigade in the 36th Infantry Division. The division was destined for Burma, and thus the battalion "having been trained as infantry, tank troops, and combined-operations troops, went straight into jungle warfare, for which we had had no training". The Glosters arrived on the Arakan Peninsula (modern day Rakhine) in February 1944, were part of the relief effort in the Battle of the Admin Box, and fought in dispersed, company-scale actions in the capture of the Mayu tunnels and Hambone Hill. The division went into reserve in May and was airlifted to Myitkyina in July, transferring to the Northern Combat Area Command (NCAC) under the American General Joseph Stilwell. It pushed south along the Mandalay railway and captured Taungni on 9 August, during which period the 10th Battalion lost more men to sickness than enemy action. Brought back up to strength in September, the battalion was engaged in four days of fierce fighting at Pinwe in November, losing all the officers in both A and C Companies, and all but one in B Company, before being relieved on 26 November.

The 36th Division continued its advance south in January 1945, and the 10th Battalion saw action in a series of short battles around Mabein that month. The battalion saw its last action of the war supporting the 26th Indian Brigade attack at Myitson on the River Shweli, during which D Company was cut off for five days before the rest of the battalion was able to link up with it on 16 February. Of the 250 or so men in the battalion before the battle, 119 were killed or wounded by the time the Japanese withdrew on 17 February. Although the men had fought well, there were bitter recriminations over the conduct of the battle between the commander of the 26th Brigade, Brigadier M. B. Jennings, and the 10th Battalion's commanding officer, Lieutenant-Colonel Richard Butler, which resulted in Butler being sacked. After reaching Mandalay, the battalion returned to India in May, and was disbanded at Poona in December 1945.

== Post-war era ==
The regiment accrued 20 different battle honours and lost 870 men killed in the nine battalions that had served under its colours during the Second World War. Only the two regular battalions remained with the regiment at the war's end, though the territorial 5th Battalion was returned to the colours on 1 March 1947 and assigned to the 129th Infantry Brigade of the 43rd (Wessex) Infantry Division. That same year, the 1st Battalion was reduced to a cadre and returned from India to the UK, and the 2nd Battalion was posted to Jamaica and detached companies to the Imperial fortress colony of Bermuda and British Honduras (modern day Belize). It was in Jamaica that, in accordance with the restructuring of the British Army, the regiment's two battalions swapped colours and amalgamated to form the single-battalion Gloucestershire Regiment (28th/61st) on 21 September 1948.

== Korean War ==
After its return to the UK in 1949, the 1st Battalion, commanded by Lieutenant-Colonel James Carne, was assigned to the 29th Independent Infantry Brigade Group, and on 3 November 1950, following the outbreak of the Korean War, the battalion arrived with the brigade in Korea. At the beginning of December, the 29th Brigade provided the rearguard during the general retreat that followed the United Nations (UN) defeat at the Battle of the Ch'ongch'on River. On 16 February, after UN forces launched a counter-offensive, the Glosters – with support from the 25-pounders of the 45th Field Regiment RA, the mortars of the 170th Heavy Mortar Battery and direct fire from 17 Centurion tanks of the 8th King's Royal Irish Hussars – successfully assaulted Hill 327, south of the River Han, for the loss of 10 killed and 29 wounded.

=== Battle of the Imjin River ===
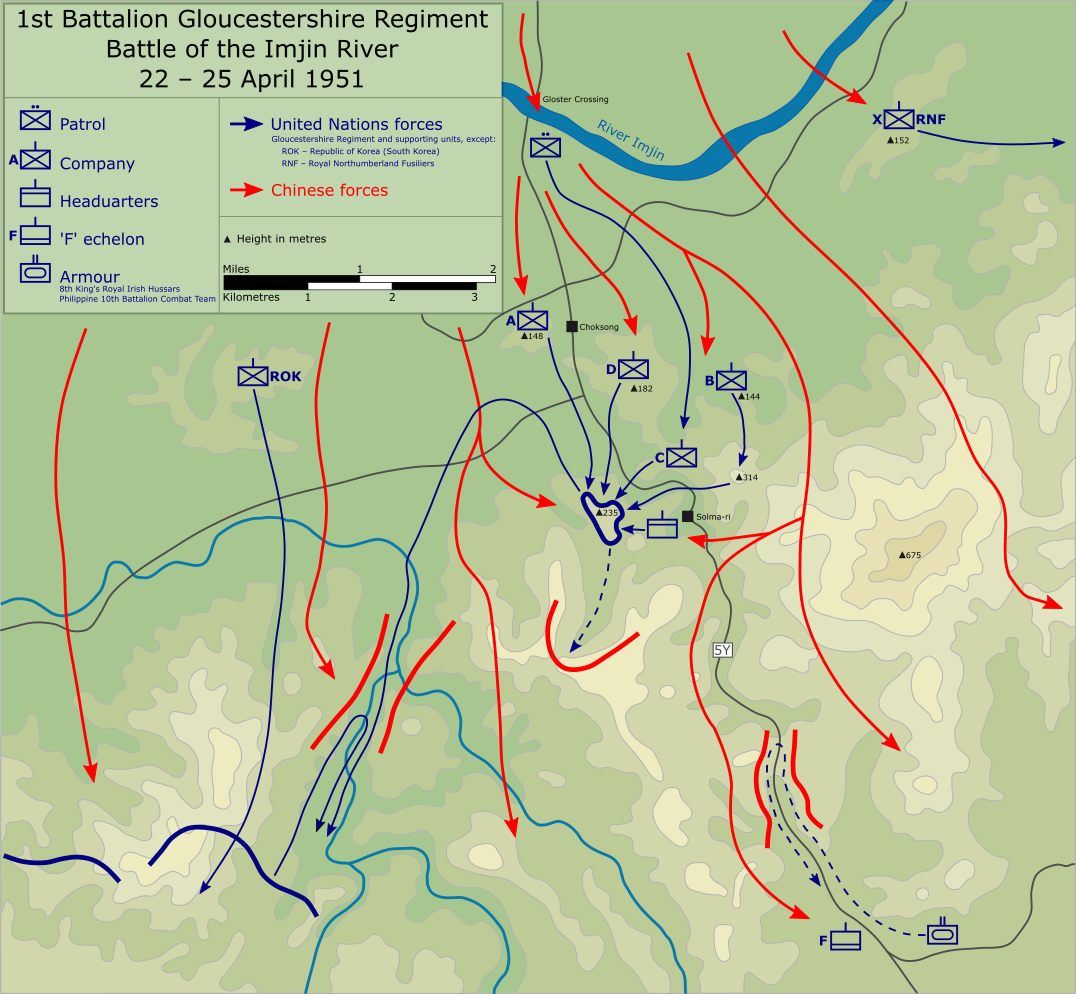
Gloucestershire Regiment at the Battle of the Imjin River

Early in April, the 29th Brigade, supported by the 45th Field Regiment RA and under command of the United States (US) 3rd Infantry Division, took up scattered positions on a 9-mile (14 km) front in Line Kansas along the Imjin river. The 657 men of the 1st Battalion's fighting component, supported by C Troop 170th Heavy Mortar Battery RA, were thinly spread on the brigade's left flank in positions set back some 2,000 yards (1,800 m) from the river, guarding a ford near the village of Choksong. (Note: Including attached troops, the total strength in the forward positions on the Imjin river was around 774 men. This included 32 men of the 45th Field Regiment and 46 men of C Troop 170th Heavy Mortar Battery.) Company A held Castle Hill (Hill 148) overlooking the ford, D Company was at Hill 182, 1,500 yards (1,400 m) to the south-east, and B Company was at Hill 144, to the east of D Company. Company C was in reserve near Hill 314, overlooking battalion headquarters (HQ) and Support Company at Solma-Ri. (Note: Although Line Kansas formed a relatively straight line from the coast through the ROK 1st Division and the 29th Brigade positions and on eastwards, on the 29th Brigade's right flank the UN front line dog-legged with the Imjin river north of Line Kansas and then east along Line Utah. On the first day of the battle, UN forces fell back to Line Kansas, but both the Koreans and the British were already on Line Kansas, and did not have as much leeway to fall back. Later in the war an entire division would be allocated to the same frontage as the 29th Brigade were required to hold.) The battalion's second-in-command, Major Digby Grist, was with rear headquarters ("F echelon") some five miles (eight kilometres) behind, on route Five Yankee (5Y) to Seoul. There was a two-mile (three-kilometre) gap between the Glosters and the 1st Battalion Royal Northumberland Fusiliers on their right, and on their left the 12th Regiment of the South Korean (ROK) 1st Infantry Division was one mile (two kilometres) away.

After nightfall on 22 April, the Chinese launched the Spring Offensive, the first phase of which was designed to eliminate the US 3rd Division, the 29th Brigade and the ROK 1st Division. Success would allow them to attack the US 24th and 25th Divisions in the flank and leave the way open to Seoul. Against the four battalions of the 29th Brigade the Chinese had amassed the 63rd Army, comprising the 187th, 188th and 189th Divisions; some 27,000 men in 27 infantry battalions.

==== First night – attacks on A and D Companies and the F echelon ====
At 22:00, a 17-man patrol from C Company in position on the river bank, supported by the guns of the 45th Field Regiment, engaged the leading Chinese troops three times as they attempted to cross the ford. The patrol withdrew without loss when it began to run out of ammunition, and the assaulting troops finally gained the opposite bank. During the night, the Glosters' forward companies were attacked, and by 07:30, A Company, outnumbered six to one, had been forced from Castle Hill. An attempt to retake it failed, and the company, now at less than half strength and with all officers killed or wounded, fell back to Hill 235. The withdrawal left D Company's position exposed and, with one of its platoons badly mauled in the overnight fighting, it too retired to the hill. Company B had not been pressed during the night, but the withdrawal of D Company on its left and the Fusiliers on its right left the company exposed, and it fell back to Hill 314, 800 yards (730 m) east of C Company. In the afternoon, Major Grist was with the battalion HQ during a lull in the fighting, having come up with supplies, when news came through of an attack on the F echelon position. He drove back along route 5Y, through an ambush and past a group of F echelon troops lining the road under Chinese guard, eventually reaching the brigade HQ. The loss of the F echelon position meant that the battalion was now cut off.

==== Second night – attacks on Hill 314 ====
What I must make clear to you is that my command is no longer an effective fighting force. If it is required that we shall stay here, in spite of this, we shall continue to hold.

— Lieutenant-Colonel Carne to Brigadier Brodie
Afternoon of 24 April 1951
Hill 235

At 23:00 on 23 April, the Chinese resumed their attack, throwing the fresh 189th Division against the Glosters' B and C Companies around Hill 314. Through the night the men of B Company, led by Major Edgar Harding and outnumbered 18:1, endured six assaults, calling in artillery on their own position to break up the last of them. Low on ammunition and having taken many casualties, the company was forced from its position by the seventh assault at 08:10, and just 20 survivors made it to Hill 235, to which the battalion HQ, Support and C Companies had already withdrawn. (Note: Accounts of C Company's action at Hill 314 during the night of 23/24 April are contradictory. Battalion adjutant Captain Farrar-Hockley, B Company commander Major Harding and Private David Green, who fought with C Company, all state in their books that the company was subject to a strong attack and ordered to withdraw during the night, and Daniell, p. 351, states that only a third of the company reached Hill 235. Lieutenant Temple and Private Coombes, both of C Company, state that the company was not subject to any major attack, and Temple states that, in the absence of the company commander, who went missing sometime during the night, he ordered the company to withdraw after daybreak on his own initiative.) With the Glosters' position still vital to the integrity of Line Kansas, Carne received orders at 07:00 on 24 April from the 3rd Division commander, General Soule, to stand his ground. He was advised that reinforcements, comprising tanks of the 8th Hussars and Philippine 10th Battalion Combat Team and the troops of the Glosters' own rear echelon, were being sent up route 5Y. The armour got to within 2,000 yards (1,800 m) of the Glosters' position before being halted in an ambush around 15:00, condemning the Glosters to another night alone on Hill 235. (Note: Some accounts state that the armoured column was being sent to relieve the Glosters on Hill 235, that Carne was given permission to withdraw to meet it two hours after being ordered to remain in position, and that, unwilling to abandon his wounded, he elected to remain and await its arrival. Carne, however, had expressed doubts to his brigade commander during the battle that the force was sufficiently strong to reach him, and later stated that he was not given the option to withdraw on 24 April and that it was his understanding that the armoured column was being sent to reinforce rather than relieve him.)

==== Third night – last stand on Hill 235 ====
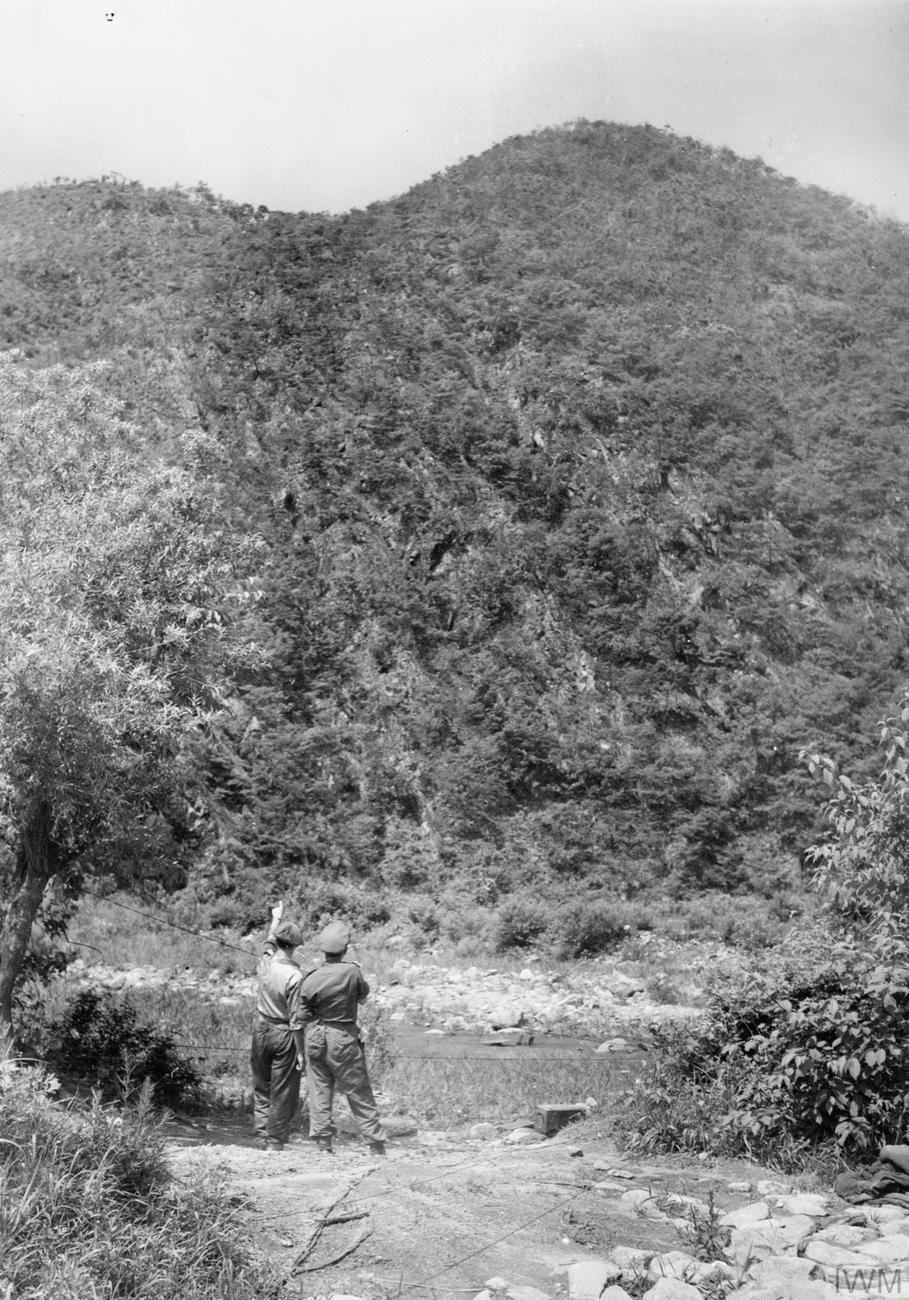
Gloster Hill (Hill 235) five weeks after the Battle of the Imjin River

By the afternoon of 24 April, the Glosters, with C Troop 170th Mortar Battery now fighting alongside as infantry, had been reduced to an effective fighting force of 400–450 men. They were low on ammunition, though in their favour the 45th Field Regiment were still able to provide support. Estimates of the opposing force range from a regiment (three battalions) to a division (three regiments). The Glosters fought through the night of 24–25 April, during which the peak was briefly occupied by the Chinese, thus threatening the Glosters' whole position on the hill. It was recaptured in a counter-attack led by the adjutant, Captain Anthony Farrar-Hockley, and the Chinese launched seven attacks in one hour in an attempt to take it again, all without success. Their assault on the hill was finally broken up after sunrise by airstrikes. That morning, with Chinese forces infiltrating miles behind the lines, UN forces began to withdraw to Line Delta. On Hill 235, the Glosters had very little ammunition, no hope of relief and, with the 45th Field Regiment on the move, no artillery support. Carne received permission to attempt a breakout at 06:05. He had no choice but to leave the wounded, estimated at some 100. The survivors split into small groups and attempted to evade the Chinese surrounding them to reach friendly lines. Just 63 men got there.

==== After the battle ====
The Glosters' stand had plugged a large gap in the 29th Brigade's front on Line Kansas, which would otherwise have left the flanks of the ROK 1st and US 3rd Divisions vulnerable. Their presence also threatened the rear of the Chinese forces as they advanced and denied them the use of routes south for their artillery and mule trains. General James Van Fleet, commander of the US Eighth Army, described the stand as "the most outstanding example of unit bravery in modern war", and in a letter to General Ridgeway, commander-in-chief of UN forces in Korea, he wrote that "the loss of 622 officers and men saved many times that number". The 29th Brigade commander, Brigadier Thomas Brodie, christened the regiment The Glorious Glosters, a sobriquet that was repeated in the headlines of the day, and Hill 235 became known as Gloster Hill, at the foot of which the Gloucester Valley Battle Monument was built in 1957.

The other battalions of the 29th Brigade had also been engaged in desperate fighting, though without the same scale of losses, and in total the brigade suffered 1,091 casualties. Of the Glosters' 622 casualties, 56 were killed and 522 were taken prisoner, some of whom had already endured the POW camps of Germany and Japan. Carne, himself taken POW and already a recipient of the DSO for his leadership during the earlier battle at Hill 327, was awarded the VC and the American Distinguished Service Cross. Lieutenant Philip Curtis, attached from the Duke of Cornwall's Light Infantry, was posthumously awarded the VC for his actions during the attempt to retake Castle Hill. Two awards of the DSO were made, to Harding and Farrar-Hockley, and six MCs, two DCMs and ten MMs were also awarded. Lieutenant Terence Waters, attached from the West Yorkshire Regiment, was posthumously awarded the George Cross for his conduct during captivity. The regiment itself, along with C Troop 170th Heavy Mortar Battery, was awarded the Presidential Unit Citation.

The battalion's strength on 26 April was 119 men, mostly rear echelon troops who had been part of the relief effort but not otherwise involved in the battle. This figure rose to 217 later in the day as men returned from leave and those few who had managed to escape from Hill 235 rejoined. The 29th Brigade was brought back up to strength in May, and the regiment returned to the line along the Imjin in September. It was relieved in November and returned to a tumultuous welcome at Southampton on 20 December. The POWs were also welcomed back to great fanfare following their release in 1953. The Korean War accounted for 113 fatalities among the Glosters, 36 of them in captivity. On 11 November 2021, the remains of three unknown members of the regiment were reburied at the United Nations cemetery in Busan.

== Later history ==
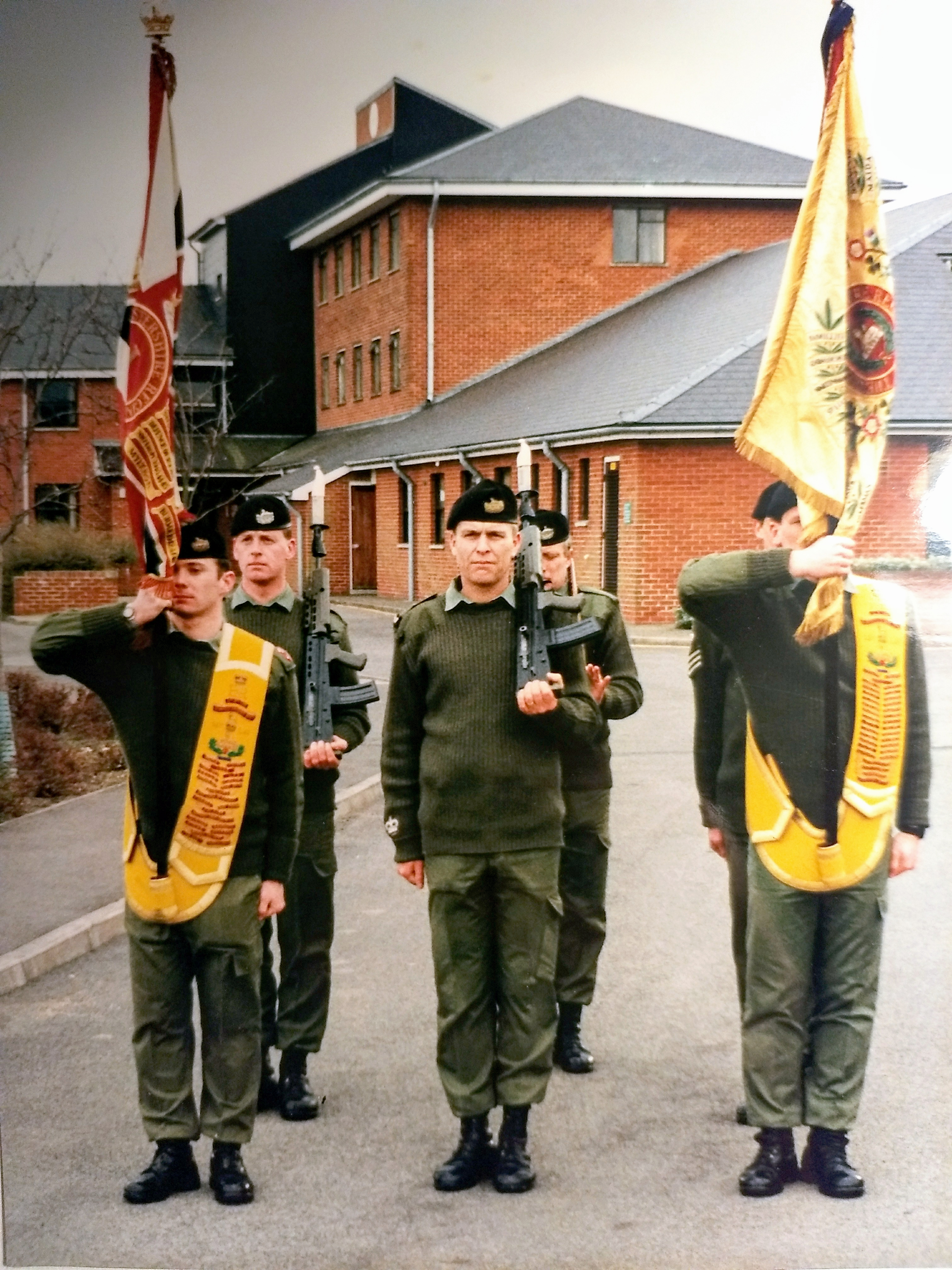
Parading the colours at Catterick Garrison on Back Badge Day 1993

While the Korean War continued, the regiment was engaged in more ceremonial affairs at home. It lined the route of King George VI's funeral procession on 15 February 1952, and it was presented with its first colours at a ceremony in Gloucester on 26 April, the two regular battalions having retained those of their predecessor regiments up to that point. On 2 June 1953, 400 men from both the 1st and 5th Battalions took part in the procession at the coronation of Queen Elizabeth II. Between 1955 and 1994, the regiment returned to more martial duties, for the most part patrolling the shrinking British Empire with tours of duty in Kenya, Aden, Bahrain, Cyprus, Belize, Gibraltar and the African colonies of Swaziland, Mauritius, Bechuanaland and Basutoland. The regiment also participated in the British contribution to NATO in Germany, serving three tours with the British Army of the Rhine and two with the British garrison in Berlin, and between 1968 and 1991 it completed seven tours in Northern Ireland during The Troubles, in which it lost five men killed.

In March 1967, the 1st Battalion became the sole unit of the Gloucestershire Regiment when, as a result of a reorganisation of the TA, the 5th Battalion became A Company of the Wessex Volunteers in the Territorial Army Volunteer Reserve. The regiment narrowly avoided amalgamation with the Royal Hampshire Regiment in 1970, and it celebrated its tercentenary in early March 1994; 300 years since the raising of Gibson's Regiment of Foot. But by that time, the dissolution of the Soviet Union had prompted the government to restructure the armed forces. As a result, the Gloucestershire Regiment was amalgamated with the Duke of Edinburgh's Royal Regiment to form the Royal Gloucestershire, Berkshire and Wiltshire Regiment. The new regiment maintained the back badge tradition, and when it was in turn amalgamated in 2007, it passed the tradition on to its successor regiment, The Rifles, who wear the back badge with their ceremonial uniform. The Glosters paraded for the last time on 26 March 1994 in Gloucester. The colours, carrying more battle honours than any other regiment of the line, were then marched to the Soldiers of Gloucestershire Museum, and the regiment followed the 28th and 61st Regiments of Foot into history.

== Battle honours ==
Battle honours inherited from predecessor regiments – all entitled to be borne on the colours
28th Regiment of Foot	Ramillies, Louisburg, Guadaloupe 1759, Quebec 1759, Martinique 1762, Havannah, St Lucia 1778, Corunna, Barrosa, Albuhera, Vittoria, Waterloo, Alma, Inkerman, Sevastopol
61st Regiment of Foot	Maida, Talavera, Busaco, Salamanca, Chillianwallah, Goojerat, Punjaub, Delhi 1857
28th and 61st Regiments of Foot	Egypt, Pyrenees, Nivelle, Nive, Orthes, Toulouse, Peninsula
Battle honours awarded to the regiment – those entitled to be borne on the colours are marked *
Boer War	Defence of Ladysmith*, Relief of Kimberley*, Paardeberg*, South Africa 1899–1902*
First World War	Mons*, Retreat from Mons, Marne 1914, Aisne 1914 '18, Ypres 1914 '15 '17*, Langemarck 1914 '17, Gheluvelt, Nonne Bosschen, Givenchy 1914, Gravenstafel, St Julien, Frezenberg, Bellewaarde, Aubers, Loos*, Somme 1916 '18*, Albert 1916 '18, Bazentin, Delville Wood, Pozières, Guillemont, Flers-Courcelette, Morval, Ancre Heights, Ancre 1916, Arras 1917 '18, Vimy 1917, Scarpe 1917, Messines 1917 '18, Pilckem, Menin Road, Polygon Wood, Broodseinde, Poelcappelle, Passchendaele, Cambrai 1917 '18, St Quentin, Bapaume 1918, Rosières, Avre, Lys*, Estaires, Hazebrouck, Bailleul, Kemmel, Béthune, Drocourt-Quéant, Hindenburg Line, Épehy, Canal du Nord, St Quentin Canal, Beaurevoir, Selle*, Valenciennes, Sambre, France and Flanders 1914–18, Piave, Vittorio Veneto*, Italy 1917–18, Struma, Doiran 1917*, Macedonia 1915–18, Suvla, Sari Bair*, Scimitar Hill, Gallipoli 1915–16, Egypt 1916, Tigris 1916, Kut al Amara 1917, Baghdad*, Mesopotamia 1916–18, Persia 1918
Second World War	Defence of Escaut*, St Omer-La-Bassée, Wormhoudt, Cassel*, Villers Bocage, Mont Pincon*, Falaise*, Risle Crossing, Le Havre, Zetten, North-West Europe 1940 '44–45*, Taukyan*, Paungde*, Monywa 1942, North Arakan, Mayu Tunnels, Pinwe*, Shweli, Myitson*, Burma 1942 '44–45*
Korean War	Hill 327, Imjin*, Korea 1950–51*
Battle honours and honorary distinctions awarded to affiliated units
4th Battalion (Militia)	St. Helena 1901, South Africa 1899–02
1st and 2nd Volunteer Battalions	South Africa 1899–02
5th Battalion (TA)	A badge of the Reconnaissance Corps with years '1944–1945' and scroll 'North-West Europe'

== Victoria Crosses ==
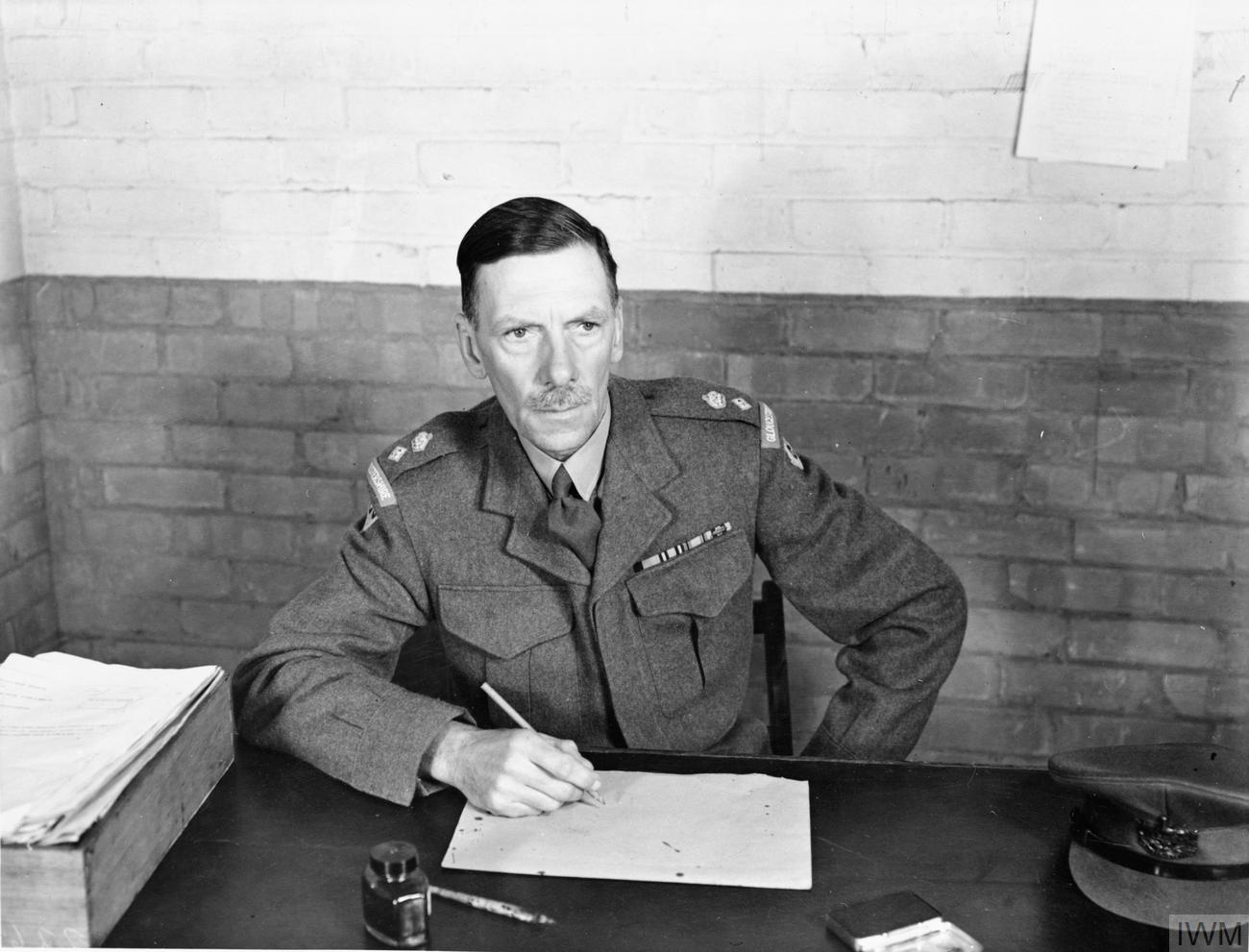
Lieutenant-Colonel Carne

The following were awarded the Victoria Cross, Britain's highest award for bravery, while serving with the Gloucestershire Regiment:

- Adrian Carton de Wiart – attached to the 8th Battalion from the 4th Royal Irish Dragoon Guards. Awarded for actions during the First World War;
- Manley Angell James – 8th Battalion. Awarded for actions during the First World War;
- Francis George Miles – 1/5th Battalion. Awarded for actions during the First World War;
- Hardy Falconer Parsons – 14th Battalion. Awarded posthumously for actions during the First World War;
- James Power Carne – 1st Battalion. Awarded for actions during the Korean War;
- Philip Curtis – attached to the 1st Battalion from the Duke of Cornwall's Light Infantry. Awarded posthumously for actions during the Korean War.

Daniel Burges, a temporary Lieutenant-Colonel in the Gloucestershire Regiment, was awarded the VC during the First World War while commanding the 7th Battalion South Wales Borderers.

== Colonels of the Regiment ==
The following served in the ceremonial position of Colonel of the Regiment:

- 1881 Major-General Julius E. Goodwyn CB (Last colonel of the 28th Regiment of Foot)
- 1881 Lieutenant-General Sir Thomas M. Steel KCB (Last colonel of the 61st Regiment of Foot)
- 1883 General John William Sidney Smith CB
- 1897 Lieutenant-General Sir John Patrick Redmond CB
- 1902 Lieutenant-General William Roberts CB
- 1912 Major-General Sir Francis Howard KCB KCMG
- 1913 Major-General Alexander L. Emerson
- 1918 General Sir John Stephen Cowans
- 1921 Lieutenant-General Right Honourable Sir Frederick Shaw KCB
- 1931 Brigadier-General Alexander W. Pagan DSO
- 1947 Lieutenant-General Sir H. Edward de R. Wetherall KBE CB DSO MC
- 1954 Major-General Charles E. A. Firth CB CBE DSO
- 1964 Brigadier Philip C. S. Heidenstam CBE
- 1971 Brigadier Anthony P. A. Arengo-Jones OBE
- 1978 General Sir Anthony Farrar-Hockley KCB DSO MBE MC M.Litt
- 1984 Lieutenant-General Sir John Waters KCB CBE
- 1991–1994 Major-General Robin Digby Grist OBE (to RGBW)
