= Frederick Berkeley, 5th Earl of Berkeley =

British peer and militia officer (1745–1810)

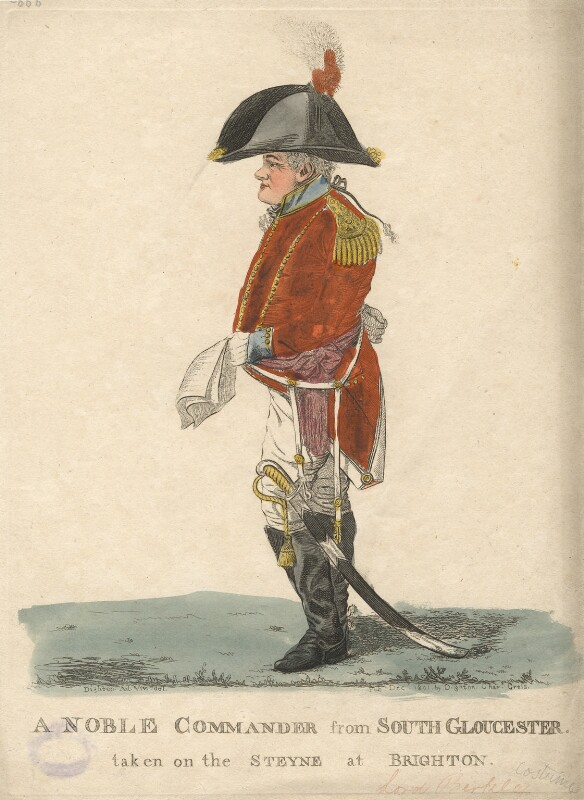
An illustration of Berkeley in his South Gloucestershire Militia uniform.

Colonel Frederick Augustus Berkeley, 5th Earl of Berkeley (24 May 1745 – 8 August 1810) was a British peer and militia officer who served as the Lord Lieutenant of Gloucestershire from 1766 to 1810.

== Origins and education ==
Berkeley was the eldest son and heir of Augustus Berkeley, 4th Earl of Berkeley, by Elizabeth, daughter of Henry Drax, of Ellerton Abbey, Yorkshire. He succeeded his father in the Earldom and as 13th Baron Berkeley in 1755.

== Career ==
In 1766, Berkeley was appointed Lord Lieutenant of Gloucestershire, High Steward of Gloucester, Constable of St Briavels, Warden of the Forest of Dean and Colonel of the South Gloucestershire Militia, which he commanded until his death. He served as a colonel in 1779 and 1794 when his regiment was embodied for full-time service.

George W. E. Russell gives the following account of an adventure that Berkeley once had on the road:

He had always declared that any one might without disgrace be overcome by superior numbers, but that he would never surrender to a single highwayman. As he was crossing Hounslow Heath one night, on his way from Berkeley Castle to London, his travelling carriage was stopped by a man on horseback, who put his head in at the window and said, "I believe you are Lord Berkeley?" "I am." "I believe you have always boasted that you would never surrender to a single highwayman?" "I have." "Well," presenting a pistol, "I am a single highwayman, and I say, 'Your money or your life.'" "You cowardly dog," said Lord Berkeley, "do you think I can’t see your confederate skulking behind you?" The highwayman, who was really alone, looked hurriedly around, and Lord Berkeley shot him through the head.

== Marriage and issue ==
Berkeley and Mary Cole (who also passed under the name of Tudor), the daughter of a local publican and butcher, had seven sons and five daughters, but the disputed date of their marriage prevented their elder sons from succeeding as Earl of Berkeley and Baron Berkeley. They asserted that the marriage had taken place on 30 March 1785, but the earliest ceremony of which there is incontrovertible proof was a wedding in Lambeth Church, Surrey, on 16 May 1796, at which date she was pregnant with their seventh child.

He settled Berkeley Castle upon their eldest son, William FitzHardinge Berkeley, but William's attempt to assume his father's honours were disallowed by the House of Lords, who considered him illegitimate.

Berkeley's titles devolved as a matter of law upon his fifth but first legitimate son, Thomas Morton Fitzhardinge Berkeley (1796–1882), but were never used by him and he did not take his seat in the House of Lords. Per his father's will, he would have lost his small inheritance had he disputed his eldest brother's claim to the titles.

- William FitzHardinge Berkeley (1786–1857), created Baron Segrave of Berkeley Castle on 10 September 1831 and Earl FitzHardinge on 17 August 1841 in compensation for losing his father's titles; died unmarried
- Admiral Maurice Frederick FitzHardinge Berkeley (1788–1867), Royal Navy officer, created 1st Baron FitzHardinge of Bristol on 5 August 1861 after unsuccessfully trying to claim the Barony of Berkeley following his elder brother's death; married Lady Charlotte Lennox, daughter of 4th Duke of Richmond and secondly Lady Charlotte Reynolds-Moreton, daughter of 1st Earl of Ducie, and had issue by his first wife
- Augustus FitzHardinge Berkeley (26 March 1789 – 27 December 1872), married in 1815 Mary Dashwood-King, daughter of Sir John Dashwood-King, 3rd Baronet
- Francis Henry FitzHardinge Berkeley (7 December 1794 – 10 March 1870), politician
- Maria FitzHardinge Berkeley (2 April 1790 – buried 2 June 1793), died young
- Henrietta FitzHardinge Berkeley (13 June 1793 – by 1819)

Born after the recognised marriage of 1796:

- Thomas Moreton FitzHardinge Berkeley, de jure 6th Earl of Berkeley (19 October 1796 – 27 August 1882), died unmarried
- George Charles Grantley FitzHardinge Berkeley (10 February 1800 – 20 February 1881)
- Lady Mary Henrietta FitzHardinge Berkeley (4 October 1801 – 19 November 1873), died unmarried
- Lady Caroline FitzHardinge Berkeley (12 April 1803 – 20 January 1886) married James Maxse and had issue:
  - Sir Henry Berkeley Fitzhardinge Maxse
- Craven FitzHardinge Berkeley (28 July 1805 – 1 July 1855), married first, in 1839, Augusta St Paul, daughter of Sir Horace St Paul, 1st Baronet. Married secondly Charlotte, daughter of General Denzil Onslow, in 1845. Issue with his first wife:
  - Louisa Milman, 15th Baroness Berkeley
- Lady Emily Elizabeth FitzHardinge Berkeley (30 April 1807 – 30 March 1895), married Capt. Sydney Augustus Capel

== Arms ==
Coat of arms of Frederick Berkeley, 5th Earl of Berkeley
Crest A mitre, gules, labelled and garnished or, charged with a chevron and crosses-patée, as in the arms. Escutcheon Gules a chevron between ten crosses patee, six in chief and four in base, argent. Supporters Two lions, argent, the sinister ducally crowned gules, collared and chained gold. Motto Dieu avec nous (God with us).

Peerage of England
Preceded by Augustus Berkeley	Earl of Berkeley; 1755–1810	Succeeded by Thomas Berkeley
