= Royal South Gloucestershire Light Infantry Militia =

Auxiliary unit of the British Army

Royal South Gloucestershire Light Infantry 3rd Battalion, Gloucestershire Regiment
- Active: 15 May 1759–1 April 1953
- Country: Kingdom of Great Britain (1759–1800); United Kingdom (1801–1953)
- Branch: Militia
- Role: Infantry
- Garrison/HQ: Gloucester; Horfield Barracks, Bristol

Commanders
- Notable commanders: Norborne Berkeley, 4th Baron Botetourt; Frederick Berkeley, 5th Earl of Berkeley; William Berkeley, 1st Earl FitzHardinge; Francis Berkeley, 2nd Baron FitzHardinge; Sir William Guise, 5th Baronet; Col George H. Burges; Col William E.P. Burges

The Royal South Gloucestershire Light Infantry (RSGLI), later the 3rd Battalion, Gloucestershire Regiment was a Militia regiment raised in the county of Gloucestershire in the West of England. From its formal creation in 1759 the regiment served in home defence in all of Britain's major wars until 1918.

== Background ==
The universal obligation to military service in the Shire levy was long established in England and its legal basis was updated by two acts of 1557 (4 & 5 Ph. & M. cc. 2 and 3), which placed selected men, the 'trained bands', under the command of Lords Lieutenant appointed by the monarch. This is seen as the starting date for the organised county militia in England. The Gloucestershire Trained Bands were called out in the Armada year of 1588, and again a century later during the Monmouth Rebellion and the Glorious Revolution (when they were among the few units to see action in a largely bloodless campaign). The Gloucestershire Militia continued to be mustered for training during the reign of William III; by now they were divided into four foot regiments (White, Green, Blue and Red) as well as a regiment of horse and a separate Bristol regiment. But after the Treaty of Utrecht in 1713 the militia was allowed to dwindle.

== South Gloucestershire Militia ==
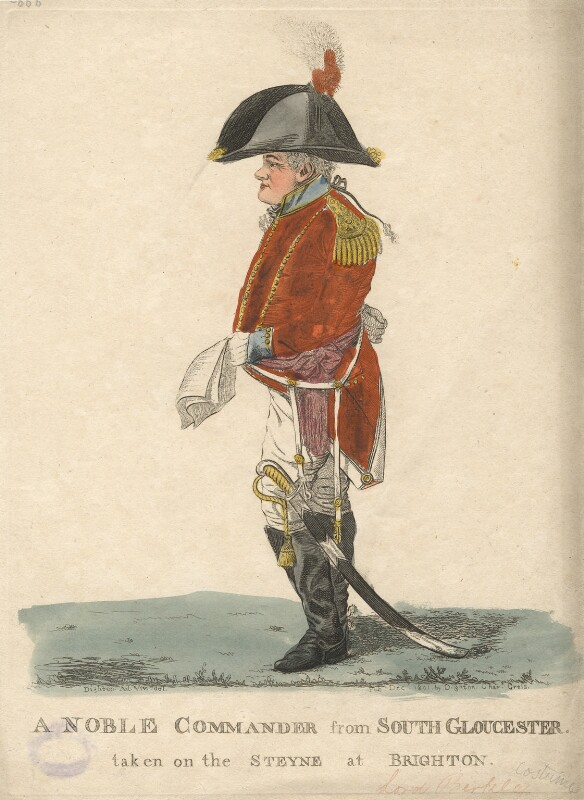
An illustration of Frederick Berkeley, 5th Earl of Berkeley in his South Gloucestershire Militia uniform.

=== Seven Years War ===
Under threat of French invasion during the Seven Years' War a series of Militia Acts from 1757 re-established county militia regiments, the men being conscripted by means of parish ballots (paid substitutes were permitted) to serve for three years. Gloucestershire, with the cities of Gloucester and Bristol, was given a quota of 960 men to raise. It was one of the first counties to meet the bulk of its quota (encompassing the vestiges of the old regiments) and was ready to issue them with arms on 15 May 1759. A train of waggons carrying arms and accoutrements for the regiment left the Tower of London on 22 May. The first or South battalion of the regiment was embodied for permanent duty at Gloucester on 27 July with eight companies under the command of Colonel Norborne Berkeley, who became Lord Lieutenant of Gloucestershire in 1762.

At that time the second or North Battalion had only gathered two companies but it was formally raised with seven companies at Cirencester on 22 August 1760, despite riots in the town against the ballot. It was embodied on 9 April 1761 and both battalions were camped together at Winchester during the summer of 1761. Here the South battalion was badly hit by sickness: from a strength of 551 men in June, it had only 312 on parade on 5 October, and by the end of the season the regiment was down to about 100 fit men. Colonel Berkeley had huts built by the regimental pioneers to house the sick men. In November the battalion marched to Bristol for the winter.

The Seven Years War ended with the Treaty of Paris on 10 February 1763 and the two battalions of Gloucestershire militia were disembodied, but not before they became separate South and North regiments on 20 April. Norborne Berkeley, now Lord Botetourt, was succeeded as Lord Lieutenant and colonel of the South Regiment by the Earl of Berkeley in 1766.

=== War of American Independence ===
After the outbreak of the War of American Independence in 1775 a controversial Act of Parliament was passed to 'Enable His Majesty to call out and assemble the Militia in all cases of Rebellion in any part of the Dominion belonging to the Crown of Great Britain' (raising the possibility that they may have to serve in North America). In the event the militia was called out in its traditional role when Britain was threatened with invasion by the Americans' allies, France and Spain. The South Regiment was embodied in 1778 under the command of the Earl of Berkeley. In the summer of 1781 the regiment, 600 strong, formed part of the 3rd Brigade of the Plymouth garrison, accommodated in the town's barracks. It was disembodied in 1782.

From 1784 to 1792 the militia were assembled for their 28 days' annual training, but to save money only two-thirds of the men were actually called out.

=== French Wars and the Long Peace ===
In view of the worsening international situation the militia was embodied for service in 1792, even though Revolutionary France did not declare war on Britain until 1 February 1793. On 14 March 1794 the Earl of Berkeley was commissioned as a colonel in the Regular Army for the duration of the embodiment. Both Gloucestershire regiments were at Weymouth, Dorset, in 1795 when King George III stayed there and granted them the title 'Royal', but the North regiment lost its 'Fusiliers' distinction the following year.

During the French Wars the militia were employed anywhere in the country for coast defence, manning garrisons, guarding prisoners of war, and for internal security, while the Regular Army regarded them as a source of trained men if they could be persuaded to transfer. Their traditional local defence duties were taken over by the part-time Volunteers. Service in the militia could be hard: the men found that a daily food allowance of five pence did not go far when the price of provisions rose, and some units were involved in food riots. While stationed at Portsmouth in 1795 the men of the Gloucestershire Militia forced the local butchers to lower their prices.

As the invasion threat grew in 1796 the Militia was doubled in size: Gloucestershire had to find an additional 1757 militiamen for the Supplementary Militia, though unlike some counties these appear to have been incorporated into the two existing regiments. The Supplementary Militia were stood down in 1799, but the county had to find 1163 more in 1802.

A peace treaty having been agreed (the Treaty of Amiens), the militia were disembodied in 1802. The peacetime quota for Gloucestershire was set at 1163 militiamen. But the Peace of Amiens quickly broke down, and they were embodied once more in 1803. Both regiments marched to Portsmouth, where they did duty alternately. They resumed the routine of summer camps and winter quarters around the country, undergoing training, suppressing smuggling and guarding prisoners, all the while being depleted by men volunteering for the regulars. During the summer of 1805, when Napoleon was massing his 'Army of England' at Boulogne for a projected invasion, the South Gloucestershire regiment with 723 men in 10 companies under Lt-Col John Wall was housed in the town and barracks at Brighton. It was at the time the only unit in Maj-Gen the Earl of Craven's brigade. The two Gloucestershire regiments came together again in August 1808, when a large militia camp was held near Brighton, the excuse being the birthday of the Prince of Wales, but the opportunity being taken to carry out collective manoeuvres. The militia continued to supply recruits to the Regular army, and struggled to replace them.

The Earl of Berkeley died on 8 August 1810, having commanded the regiment for over 40 years. On 22 August his eldest son William FitzHardinge Berkeley (claimant 6th Earl of Berkeley, later created Earl FitzHardinge) was commissioned colonel of the regiment in his place and continued until his death in 1857.

After Napoleon's exile to Elba the Royal South Gloucestershire Militia was disembodied in 1814. Although officers continued to be commissioned into the militia and ballots were still held, the regiments were rarely assembled for training after the Battle of Waterloo. (Note: It is possible that the Gloucesters were called out in 1827 or 1840 to deal with riots by weavers and Chartists at Dursley.)

== 1852 Reforms ==
The national Militia of the United Kingdom was revived by the Militia Act 1852, enacted during a period of international tension. As before, units were raised and administered on a county basis, and filled by voluntary enlistment (although conscription by means of the Militia Ballot might be used if the counties failed to meet their quotas). Training was for 56 days on enlistment, then for 21–28 days per year, during which the men received full army pay. Under the Act, Militia units could be embodied by Royal Proclamation for full-time service in three circumstances:

1. 'Whenever a state of war exists between Her Majesty and any foreign power'.
2. 'In all cases of invasion or upon imminent danger thereof'.
3. 'In all cases of rebellion or insurrection'.

Under the new organisation, militia regiments had an honorary colonel, but were commanded by a lieutenant-colonel. Henry W. Newman, originally commissioned as a captain in the Royal North Gloucesters in 1820, was commissioned as lieutenant-colonel commandant of the Royal South Gloucesters on 3 April 1854.

=== Crimean War and after ===
War having broken out with Russia in 1854 and an expeditionary force sent to the Crimea, the Militia were called out. In this year the regiment was redesignated the Royal South Gloucestershire Light Infantry (RSGLI), or more pompously as the Royal South Battalion of the Gloucestershire Light Infantry Militia The regiment was disembodied in 1856 and unlike the RNG was not embodied during the Indian Mutiny in 1857.

After Earl FitzHardinge died on 10 October 1857, his nephew Francis FitzHardinge Berkeley (later Lord Fitzhardinge), formerly a captain in the Royal Horse Guards, was appointed honorary colonel of the RSGLI on 22 December. In the 1860s Col Berkeley took over from Newman as lieutenant-colonel commandant of the regiment, reverting to hon col on 26 May 1868 when Sir William Guise, 4th Baronet of Highnam Court, formerly of the 75th (Stirlingshire) Regiment of Foot, was commissioned as lt-col.

Under the 'Localisation of the Forces' scheme introduced by the Cardwell Reforms of 1872, Militia regiments were brigaded with their local Regular and Volunteer battalions – for the Gloucestershire Militia this was with the 28th (North Gloucestershire) and 61st (South Gloucestershire) Regiments of Foot in Sub-District No 37 (County of Gloucester) in Western District. The Militia were now under the War Office rather than their county lords lieutenant.

Although often referred to as brigades, the sub-districts were purely administrative organisations, but in a continuation of the Cardwell Reforms a mobilisation scheme began to appear in the Army List from December 1875. This assigned Regular and Militia units to places in an order of battle of corps, divisions and brigades for the 'Active Army', even though these formations were entirely theoretical, with no staff or services assigned. The North and South Gloucestershire Militia were both assigned to 1st Brigade of 3rd Division, V Corps. The division would have mustered at Gloucester in time of war, and did actually undertake collective training at Minchinhampton Common in 1876 during the international crisis that led to the Russo-Turkish War; the Militia Reserve were also called out during this crisis. Colonel J. Pitt Bontein, a longstanding officer in the regiment, was promoted to lt-col commandant on 18 August 1880.

== 3rd Battalion, Gloucestershire Regiment ==
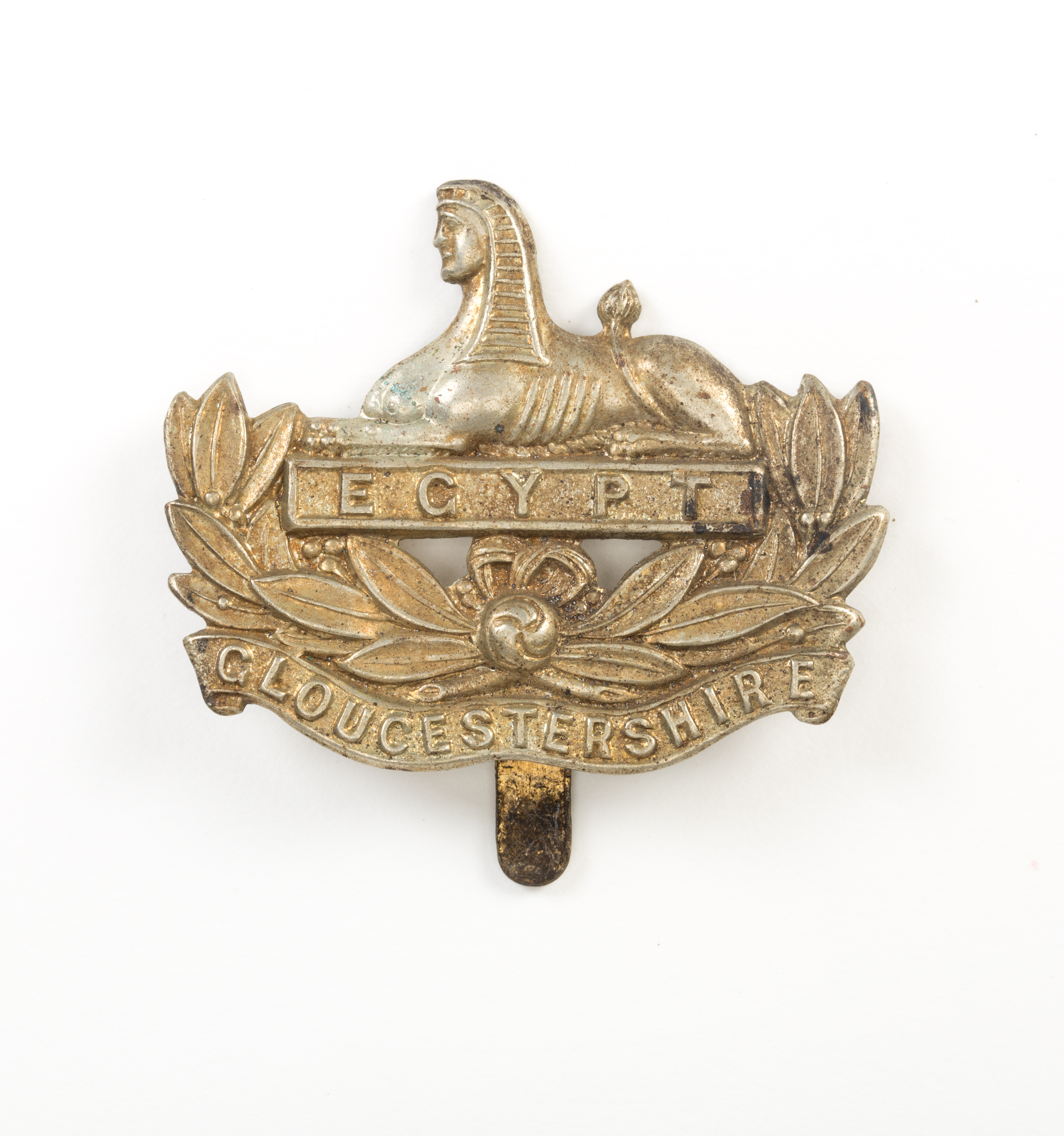
Cap badge of the Gloucestershire Regiment.

The Childers Reforms of 1881 took Cardwell's reforms further, with the linked regiments becoming two-battalion regiments and the militia formally joining as their 3rd and 4th Battalions. The 28th and 61st Foot became the Gloucestershire Regiment ('The Glosters') and the RSGLI became its 3rd Battalion on 1 July 1881. All recruits, whether Regular or Militia, underwent training at the regimental depot before being posted to their battalions, and by 1880 the RSGLI had moved its headquarters to the Glosters' depot at Horfield Barracks, Bristol. Militia battalions now had a large cadre of permanent staff (about 30). Around a third of the recruits and many young officers went on to join the Regular Army. The Militia Reserve, formed in 1868, consisted of present and former militiamen who undertook to serve overseas in case of war.

=== Second Boer War ===
After the disasters of Black Week at the start of the Second Boer War in December 1899, most of the Regular Army was sent to South Africa, and many militia units were embodied to replace them for home defence and to garrison certain overseas stations. The 3rd Gloucesters was embodied on 15 May 1900. Although the battalion remained in the UK, some of its members did see overseas service: the 3rd Gloucesters provided 117 volunteers to the 4th (Royal North Gloucestershire Militia) Bn, which was sent to guard Boer prisoners of war on Saint Helena, while Major Christopher Dering Guise, younger brother of the 3rd Bn's honorary colonel, served as a staff officer in South Africa 1900–02. The 3rd Battalion was disembodied on 13 July 1901.

== Special Reserve ==
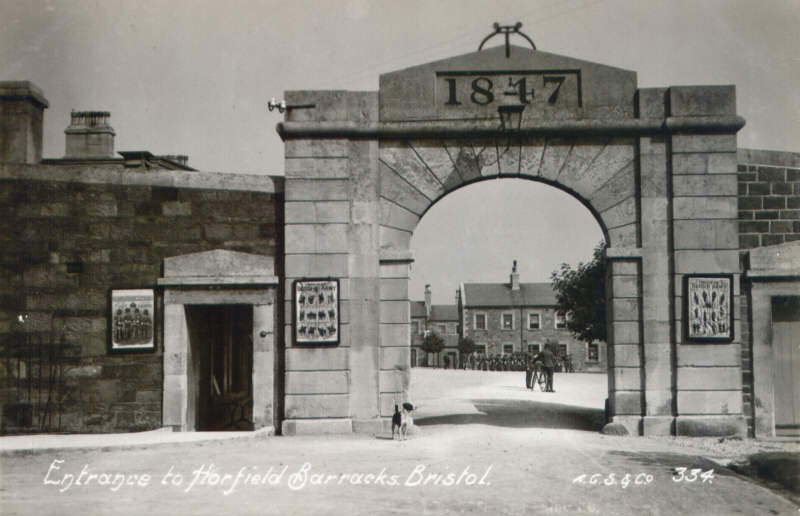
Horfield Barracks, Bristol, regimental depot of the Glosters.

After the Boer War, there were moves to reform the Auxiliary Forces (Militia, Yeomanry and Volunteers) to take their place in the six Army Corps proposed by the Secretary of State for War, St John Brodrick. However, little of Brodrick's scheme was carried out. Collective training in brigades was carried out on Salisbury Plain in 1906 and 1907, with the 3rd and 4th Bns of the Glosters brigaded with the 4th Bn Oxfordshire Light Infantry and 3rd Bn Berkshires. training was Under the more sweeping Haldane Reforms in 1908, the Militia was replaced by the Special Reserve, a semi-professional force whose role was to provide reinforcement drafts for Regular units serving overseas in wartime (similar to the former Militia Reserve). The former RSGLI became the 3rd (Reserve) Battalion, Gloucestershire Regiment (Note: The Army List continued to show the battalion as the 3rd (Royal South Gloucester Militia).) on 7 June 1908, while the 4th Bn was disbanded on 31 July.

The Burges family of Bristol was well-represented among the officers of the Glosters, both Regular and Militia. William E.P. Burges was first commissioned into the RSGLI in 1880 and was promoted to command it in 1905. When he retired on 9 October 1913, George H. Burges (first commissioned into the battalion on 23 November 1889) was promoted to succeed him.

== World War I ==
=== 3rd (Reserve) Battalion ===
The 3rd Battalion under Lt-Col George H. Burges completed its 1914 annual training at Perham Down Camp and returned to Bristol where the men were dismissed on 27 June. On the outbreak of war orders to mobilise were received on 4 August 1914, and 380 Special Reservists and 550 Army Reservists had joined by 8 August. That night the battalion left Bristol for its war station at Abbey Wood, near Woolwich, where it relieved a London battalion of the Territorial Force in camp. Besides training, the role of the battalion was to guard Woolwich Arsenal and the huge dumps of explosives distributed over Abbey Wood Marshes. From September the battalion sent its first reinforcement drafts to the 1st Battalion, which was serving with the British Expeditionary Force (BEF) on the Western Front, and later to the 2nd Bn, when that returned from North China.

Meanwhile there had been a flood of recruits for 'Kitchener's Army', and Col William E.P. Burges, retired from the 3rd Bn, was appointed Temporary Lt-Col to command the 12th (Service) Battalion, Gloucestershire Regiment (Bristol's Own). He trained the battalion assiduously, but when it was ready to be sent to join the BEF he was considered too old for active service at the age of 59 and was ordered to relinquish command in August 1915. However, after the war he was appointed Honorary Colonel of the 3rd Battalion. The 11th (Reserve) Battalion (see below) was formed alongside the 3rd Bn at Abbey Wood in October 1914 to provide reinforcements for the Kitchener battalions of the Glosters.

The 3rd Battalion moved to Kent in May 1915, first to Gravesend and then to Sittingbourne in May 1916, forming part of the Thames and Medway Garrison, all the while training and forming drafts of reservists, recruits and returning wounded for the fighting battalions. Thousands of men would have passed through the ranks of the battalion during the war.

It remained in the Sittingbourne area until the end of the war. Each summer it camped at Milstead where it played an active part in village life. The village school was requisitioned after school hours for an Army Schoolmaster to teach young soldiers, and the village hall served as a weekly cinema for the soldiers. After the war a memorial to Lt-Col George Burges and the 3rd Gloucesters was erected at the field where they camped. George Burges was promoted to Brevet Colonel at the end of the war and died on 6 August 1919 while still in command. His grave at St Michael the Archangel Church, Warfield, Berkshire, is a Commonwealth War Grave.

The 3rd Bn was disembodied on 9 August 1919, when its remaining personnel were drafted to the 1st Bn.

=== 11th (Reserve) Battalion ===
After Lord Kitchener issued his call for volunteers in August 1914, the battalions of the 1st, 2nd and 3rd New Armies ('K1', 'K2' and 'K3' of 'Kitchener's Army') were quickly formed at the regimental depots. The SR battalions also swelled with new recruits and were soon well above their establishment strength. On 8 October 1914 each SR battalion was ordered to use the surplus to form a service battalion of the 4th New Army ('K4'). Accordingly, the 3rd (Reserve) Bn formed the 11th (Service) Bn at Abbey Wood. In November it moved to Cheltenham and trained to join 106th Brigade in 35th Division. On 10 April 1915 the War Office decided to convert the K4 battalions into 2nd Reserve units, providing drafts for the K1–K3 battalions in the same way that the SR was doing for the Regular battalions. The Glosters' battalion became 11th (Reserve) Battalion in 4th Reserve Brigade and the following month it moved to Belhus Park, near Grays, Essex, where it trained drafts for the 7th, 8th, 9th and 10th (Service) Bns of the Glosters. In September it moved with 4th Reserve Bde to Seaford, East Sussex. On 1 September 1916 the 2nd Reserve battalions were transferred to the Training Reserve (TR) and the battalion was redesignated 16th Training Reserve Bn, still in 4th Reserve Bde at Seaford. The training staff retained their Glosters badges. Later the battalion moved to Bedford, where it was disbanded on 22 February 1918.

=== Postwar ===
The SR resumed its old title of Militia in 1921 and then became the Supplementary Reserve in 1924, but like most militia battalions the 3rd Gloucestershires remained in abeyance after World War I. By the time of his death in 1938, Col William Burges (as honorary colonel) was the only remaining officer listed for the battalion. The Militia was formally disbanded in April 1953.

== Colonels ==
The following served as Colonel or Honorary Colonel of the unit after its re-establishment in 1759:

- Norborne Berkeley, 4th Baron Botetourt, 1759–1766
- Frederick Berkeley, 5th Earl of Berkeley, appointed 1766, died 1810
- William Berkeley, appointed 1810, died 1857
- Francis Berkeley, 2nd Baron FitzHardinge, appointed 1857, reappointed 1868 died 1896
- Sir William Guise, 5th Baronet, former commanding officer, appointed honorary colonel on 10 February 1897 and reappointed to the same position in the Special Reserve on 7 June 1908, died 1920
- William E.P. Burges, OBE, former commanding officer (of 3rd and 12th Bns), appointed 2 February 1920, died 1938

== Heritage and ceremonial ==
=== Precedence ===
In September 1759 it was ordered that militia regiments on service were to take their relative precedence from the date of their arrival in camp. In 1760 this was altered to a system of drawing lots where regiments did duty together. During the War of American Independence the counties were given an order of precedence determined by an annual ballot, beginning in 1778. In the French Revolutionary War the order balloted for in 1793 (Gloucestershire was 8th) remained in force until 1802, and another drawing took place at the start of the Napoleonic War (Gloucestershire was 7th), which remained in force until 1833. In that year the King drew the ballots for individual regiments and the resulting list remained in force with minor amendments until the end of the militia. The regiments raised before the peace of February 1763 took the first 37 places, the South Gloucesters becoming No 23, but the North Gloucesters (independent from April 1763) became No 69.

=== Uniforms and insignia ===
The uniform of the South Gloucestershire Militia was red with blue facings, the officers wearing gold lace from at least 1800. The coatee buttons from 1830 to 1854 had the letters 'S.G.' beneath a crown. In the period 1814–20, when the regiment was seventh in the list of precedence, the officers' oval gilt shoulder-plates had the numeral '7' within a garter inscribed 'Honi soit qui mal y pense', superimposed on an eight-pointed star, the whole within a garter inscribed 'Gloucester Royal South', surmounted by a ducal Coronet. In 1854 the regiment was ordered to be uniformed as light infantry and the officers' silver shoulder-belt plate of this period displayed an eight-pointed star with a bugle-horn within a garter. A bugle-horn within a crowned garter inscribed with the regiment's title was adopted for the buttons and was also worn as the badge on the men's Forage caps 1874–81. The regimental facings changed to white when the RSGLI became a battalion of the Gloucesters, and the uniform thereafter was the same as the Regulars.

The first Regimental Colour was blue with the Union Flag in the canton and probably with the Coat of arms of the Lord Lieutenant (in 1759 Lord Chedworth) in the centre.

=== Memorial ===
A memorial to 3rd Gloucesters was erected at Horn Hill, Milstead, by Mrs B. Julian, wife of Milstead's rector. Constructed of old red bricks and tiles, it bears a limestone plaque with the inscription 'IN THIS FIELD/THE 3RD BATT./GLOUCESTERSHIRE/REGIMENT/Lt Col G.H. BURGES COMMANDING/WAS ENCAMPED/DURING THE SUMMERS 1916 – 1917/1918'. The memorial became a Grade II listed building on 24 June 2020 for its historic interest ('as an eloquent witness to the service and sacrifice of soldiers who trained at Milstead Camp and the lasting impact they had on the collective memory of Milstead village') and design ('as a simple, but well executed structure probably using materials sourced from nearby Milstead Manor (Grade II*)').

== See also ==
- Militia (Great Britain)
- Militia (United Kingdom)
- Special Reserve
- Gloucestershire Militia
- Royal North Gloucestershire Militia
- Gloucestershire Regiment
