= William Berkeley, 1st Earl FitzHardinge =

British politician and landowner (1786–1857)

The Right Honourable The Earl FitzHardinge

Lord-Lieutenant of Gloucestershire
- In office 18 December 1835 – 10 October 1857
- Monarchs: William IV; Victoria
- Preceded by: The Duke of Beaufort
- Succeeded by: The Earl of Ducie

Personal details
- Born: 26 December 1786 Mount Street, Grosvenor Square, London
- Died: 10 October 1857 (aged 70) Berkeley Castle, Gloucestershire

William FitzHardinge Berkeley, 1st Earl FitzHardinge (26 December 1786 – 10 October 1857), known as The Lord Segrave between 1831 and 1841, was a British landowner and politician.

== Background ==
Berkeley was born at Mount Street, Grosvenor Square, London, the eldest son of Frederick Berkeley, 5th Earl of Berkeley, by Mary Cole, daughter of William Cole. He was the brother of Maurice Berkeley, 1st Baron FitzHardinge, Francis Henry FitzHardinge Berkeley, George Charles Grantley Fitzhardinge Berkeley and Craven Berkeley and the nephew of Sir George Cranfield Berkeley.

== Dispute over legitimacy ==
Great uncertainties were raised about whether his parents had two marriage ceremonies, or whether his mother was as with other children she conceived with his father a different/same but unmarried lady. On 16 May 1796 the Earl of Berkeley had married Mary Cole at Lambeth. The Earl then maintained they had married at Berkeley, Gloucestershire, officiated by the Vicar of Berkeley, on 30 March 1785. This ceremony was, however, kept secret until after the Lambeth marriage, with Mary being known as Miss Tudor between the two dates. Shortly after the Lambeth marriage a certificate of the Berkeley ceremony was produced, having been recovered, it was alleged, under very strange circumstances. The couple had had six sons up to the marriage of 1796, including William Berkeley. In 1799, after the Earl announced his earlier marriage/ceremony, William Berkeley (commonly styled Viscount Dursley, the normal courtesy title for the heir apparent to the earldom) obtained leave (permission) to prove his legitimacy before the Committee for Privileges of the House of Lords, and in 1801 the Earl made a deposition giving full details of the Berkeley marriage.

== Claim to barony and earldom of Berkeley ==
Lord Berkeley died in August 1810, when William Berkeley applied to be summoned to the House of Lords as Earl of Berkeley. In March 1811 the Committee for Privileges decided that the Berkeley marriage of 1786 was "not then proved" and that the petitioner's claim was not made out. William received Berkeley Castle and the other estates by will, and on 2 July, after the adverse decision of the Lords Committee, he claimed a writ of summons as a Baron as Baron by tenure of Berkeley Castle. The claim was fully laid before the Committee for Privileges in 1828 and 1829, but the Lords gave no judgement on the case. The eldest son born after the 1797 Lambeth marriage of the fifth Earl, Thomas Moreton FitzHardinge Berkeley, became on the Earl's death in 1810 de jure 6th Earl of Berkeley – however, he refused to claim his right to the earldom. In 1831 William Berkeley was raised to the peerage as Baron Segrave, of Berkeley Castle in the County of Gloucester.

== Public appointments ==
Berkeley was returned to parliament as one of two representatives for Gloucestershire in 1810 (succeeding his uncle Sir George Cranfield Berkeley), a seat he only held until 1811. He succeeded his father as Colonel of the Royal South Gloucestershire Light Infantry Militia in 1810 and commanded it until his death. In 1836 he was appointed Lord-Lieutenant of Gloucestershire, a post he retained until his death. In 1841 he was further honoured when he was made Earl FitzHardinge.

== Personal life ==
Berkeley never married. He had several mistresses, and in 1821 John Waterhouse succeeded in an action for "criminal conversation" (adultery) against him, being awarded £1000 damages at Gloucester Assizes over Berkeley's affair with Mrs Waterhouse. He died at Berkeley Castle, Gloucestershire, in October 1857, aged 70. The barony of Segrave and earldom of FitzHardinge died with him. The FitzHardinge title was revived in 1861 when his younger brother Maurice Berkeley was created Baron FitzHardinge.

Parliament of the United Kingdom
Preceded by Sir George Cranfield Berkeley; Lord Edward Somerset	Member of Parliament for Gloucestershire; 1810–1811; With: Lord Edward Somerset	Succeeded by Lord Edward Somerset; Sir Berkeley Guise, Bt
Honorary titles
Preceded by The Duke of Beaufort	Lord-Lieutenant of Gloucestershire; 1835–1857	Succeeded by The Earl of Ducie
Peerage of the United Kingdom
New creation	Earl FitzHardinge; 1841–1857	Extinct
New creation	Baron Segrave; 1831–1857	Extinct
