= Earl of Nottingham =

Title in the Peerage of England

Earldom of Nottingham held with Earldom of Winchilsea
- Arms of Finch-Hatton, Earl of Winchilsea and Earl of Nottingham Quarterly, 1st & 4th: argent, a chevron between three garbs gules; (Hatton) 2nd & 3rd, argent, a chevron between three griffins, passant, wings endorsed sable (Finch)
- Creation date: 1377 (first creation); 1383 (second creation); 1476 (third creation); 1483 (fourth creation); 1525 (fifth creation); 1596 (sixth creation); 1681 (seventh creation)
- Created by: Richard II (first and second creations); Edward IV (third creation); Edward V (fourth creation); Henry VIII (fifth creation); Elizabeth I (sixth creation); Charles II (seventh creation)
- Peerage: Peerage of England
- First holder: John de Mowbray
- Present holder: Daniel Finch-Hatton, 17th Earl of Winchilsea, 12th Earl of Nottingham
- Heir apparent: Tobias Finch-Hatton, Viscount Maidstone
- Remainder to: the 1st Earl's heirs male whatsoever
- Subsidiary titles: Viscount Maidstone; Baron Finch of Daventry; Baronet of Eastwell; Baronet of Raunston
- Extinction date: 1383 (first creation); 1476 (second creation); 1483 (third creation); 1492 (fourth creation); 1536 (fifth creation); 1681 (sixth creation)
- Seat: Kirby Hall
- Former seat: Eastwell Park
- Motto: Nil conscire sibi ("Conscious of no evil"); Virtus tutissima cassis ("Virtue is the safest helmet")

See also Earl of Winchilsea

Earl of Nottingham is a title that has been created seven times in the Peerage of England. It was first created for John de Mowbray in 1377, at the coronation of Richard II. As this creation could only pass to his legitimate heirs, it went extinct on his death in 1383. It was re-created for his younger brother Thomas de Mowbray in the same year, however. This branch of the family became Dukes of Norfolk, and the title would descend with them until John de Mowbray died without male heirs in 1476.

The third creation was for Richard of Shrewsbury, Duke of York, son of Edward IV and one of the Princes in the Tower. Richard was imprisoned by his uncle Richard III (then Lord Protector), disappearing shortly after, presumed murdered.

The earldom was briefly recreated in 1483 for the 4th time for William Berkeley, who later became Marquess of Berkeley. Then in 1525, the earldom was recreated for the 5th time for Henry Fitzroy, Duke of Richmond and Somerset and illegitimate son of Henry VIII. Both died childless within ten years of being granted the title.

The sixth creation was for Charles Howard, Lord High Admiral for Elizabeth I and James VI and I. He was commander of the English navy against the Spanish Armada, and a notable statesman in both reigns. His descendants held the earldom until 1681.

The current, seventh, creation was made in 1681 for Heneage Finch, 1st Earl of Nottingham, who died one year later. Before being created earl he was the Attorney General and Lord Chancellor, and played an active part in the aftermath of the Popish Plot. His son Daniel Finch inherited the Earldom of Winchilsea in 1729. The second earl was a prominent politician, serving as Lord President of the Council, Secretary of State for the Northern and Southern Departments, and First Lord of the Admiralty.

For subsequent family history, see Earl of Winchilsea and Nottingham.

The title is currently held by Daniel Finch-Hatton, 17th Earl of Winchilsea and 12th Earl of Nottingham.

== Earls of Nottingham ==
=== Earls of Nottingham, First creation (1377) ===
- John de Mowbray (1365–1383), 5th Baron Mowbray

=== Earls of Nottingham, Second creation (1383) ===
- Thomas de Mowbray, 1st Duke of Norfolk (1366–1399), Lord Mowbray
- Thomas de Mowbray, 4th Earl of Norfolk (1385–1405), Lord Mowbray

see the Duke of Norfolk (1397 creation) for the other Earls

Family tree of the Dukes of Norfolk and Suke of Surrey; Earls of Arundel, East Anglia, Norfolk, Norwich, Nottingham, and Surrey; and Barons Mowbray, Segrave and Stourton

Earl of East Anglia (Earls of Norfolk and Suffolk) (1st creation), a. 1069
Ralph the Staller c. 1011–1068; 1st Earl of Norfolk and Suffolk, or of the East Angles (Earl c. 1066/67 – 1068)
Earl of Surrey (1st creation), c. 1088
Ralph de Gael a. 1040–1100; 2nd Earl of Norfolk and Suffolk, or of the East Angles (Earl 1068–1074)	Roger Bigod (Bigot) d. 1107; Sheriff of Norfolk and Suffolk	William de Warenne c. 1035–1088; 1st Earl (of) Warenne / Earl of Surrey, Lord of Lewes, Seigneur de Varennes
Earldom forfeit, 1074
Earl of Norfolk (2nd creation), 1141
King Henry I c. 1068–1135	Maud Bigod	William Bigod d. 1120	Hugh Bigod; 1095–1177; 1st Earl of Norfolk (Earl 1141–1177)	William de Warenne d. 1138; 2nd Earl (of) Warenne / Earl of Surrey
Earl of Arundel, Earl of Sussex (1st creations), c. 1138
Empress Matilda c. 1102–1167	Geoffrey Plantagenet; 1113–1251; Count of Anjou	Adeliza of Louvain c. 1103–1151	William d'Aubigny c. 1109–1176; 1st Earl of Arundel (Sussex), Earl of Lincoln	William de Warenne; 1119–1148; 3rd Earl of Surrey
King Henry II; 1133–1189	William d'Aubigny b. c. 1138/1150–1176; 2nd Earl of Arundel (Sussex)	Roger Bigod c. 1144/1150–1221; 2nd Earl of Norfolk (Earl 1189–1221, disputed 1177–1189)	William of Blois c. 1137–1159	Isabel de Warenne c. 1130 – 1203; 4th Countess of Surrey suo jure	Hamelin de Warenne c. 1130–1202; Comte de Warenne / Earl of Surrey, jure uxoris
King John; 1166/1167–1216	William d'Aubigny a. 1180–1221; 3rd Earl of Arundel (Sussex)	Hugh Bigod; 1186–1225; 3rd Earl of Norfolk (Earl 1221–1225)	Maud Marshal; 1192–1248	William de Warenne c. 1160s/1170s–1240 5th Earl of Surrey
William d'Aubigny c. 1203–a. 1124; 4th Earl of Arundel (Sussex)	Hugh d'Aubigny d. 1243; 5th Earl of Arundel (Sussex)	Isabel d'Aubigny	John Fitzalan; 1200–1240; Lord of Clun and Oswestry	Roger Bigod c. 1209–1270; 4th Earl of Norfolk (Earl 1233–1270)	Hugh Bigod c. 1211–1266
Earl of Sussex (1st creation), 1282
King Henry III; 1207–1272	John Fitzalan; 1223–1267; 6th Earl of Arundel (Sussex), jure matris	John de Warenne; 1231–1304; 1st Earl of Sussex (Earl of Sussex 1282–1304), 6th Earl of Surrey (Earl of Surrey 1240–1304)
Baron Segrave of Se(a)grave, 1283
Nicholas Segrave c. 1238–a. 1295; 1st Baron Segrave	King Edward I 1239–1307	Edmund Crouchback; 1245–1296; Earl of Lancaster	John Fitzalan; 1246–1272; 7th Earl of Arundel (Sussex), jure matris	Roger Bigod c. 1245–1306; 5th Earl of Norfolk (Earl 1270–1306)
Earldom extinct, 1270
Baron Mowbray, 1283	Earl of Arundel (2nd (1st by writ) creation), 1289
John Segrave c. 1256–1325; 2nd Baron Segrave	Roger de Mowbray; 1254–1297; 1st Baron Mowbray	Richard Fitzalan; 1267–1302; 1st (or 6th) Earl of Arundel	William de Warenne; 1256–1286
Earl of Norfolk (3rd creation), 1312
Stephen Segrave d. 1325; 3rd Baron Segrave	Thomas of Brotherton; 1300–1338; 1st Earl of Norfolk (Earl 1312–1338)	John Mowbray; 1286–1322; 2nd Baron Mowbray	Henry c. 1281–1345; Earl of Leicester, Earl of Lancaster	Edmund Fitzalan; 1286–1326; 2nd (or 7th) Earl of Arundel	Alice de Warenne; 1287–1388 heir apparent to the Earldom of Surrey	John de Warenne; 1286–1347; 7th Earl of Surrey, 2nd Earl of Sussex
Earldom of Arundel (2nd creation) forfeit, 1326	Earldom of Sussex extinct(?), 1347
Earldom of Arundel (2nd creation) restored, 1331
John Segrave; 1315–1353; 4th Baron Segrave	Margaret of Brotherton; 1320–1399; Duchess of Norfolk "for life" (Duchess 1397–1399), 2nd Countess of Norfolk (Countess 1338–1399),	John Mowbray; 1310–1361; 3rd Baron Mowbray	Joan of Lancaster c. 1312–1349	Eleanor of Lancaster; 1318–1372	Richard FitzAlan c. 1313–1376; 3rd (or 8th) Earl of Arundel (Earl of Arundel 1331–1376), 8th Earl of Surrey (Earl of Surrey 1347–1376)
Baron Arundel, 1377
Elizabeth de Segrave; 1338–1368; 5th Baroness Segrave	John de Mowbray; 1340–1368; 4th Baron Mowbray	Richard FitzAlan; 1346–1397; 4th (or 9th) Earl of Arundel, 9th Earl of Surrey	John FitzAlan c. 1348–1379; 1st Baron Arundel	Alice FitzAlan
Earldom of Arundel (2nd creation) forfeit, 1397
Earl of Nottingham (1st creation), 1377	Earl of Nottingham (2nd creation), 1383; Duke of Norfolk (1st creation), 1397	Duke of Surrey, 1397
John de Mowbray; 1365–1383; Earl of Nottingham (Earl 1377–1383), 6th Baron Segrave, 5th Baron Mowbray (Baron 1368–1383)	Thomas de Mowbray; 1366–1399; 1st Duke of Norfolk, etc. (Duke 1397–1399), 3rd Earl of Norfolk (Earl 1399), 7th Baron Segrave, 6th Baron Mowbray (Baron 1377–1399)	Elizabeth Fitzalan; 1366–1425	John FitzAlan; 1364–1390; 2nd Baron Arundel	Thomas Holland; 1372–1400; Duke of Surrey, Earl of Kent, Baron Holland
Earldom of Nottingham extinct, 1383	Titles forfeit, 1399	Dukedom of Surrey renounced, 1400
Baron Stourton, 1448	Duke of Norfolk (1st creation restored), 1425	Earldom of Arundel (2nd creation) restored, 1400
John Stourton; 1400–1462; 1st Baron Stourton (Baron 1448–1462)	Thomas de Mowbray; 1385–1405; 4th Earl of Norfolk, 8th Baron Segrave, 7th Baron Mowbray (Earl 1399–1405)	John de Mowbray; 1392–1432; 2nd Duke of Norfolk (Duke 1425–1432), 5th Earl of Norfolk, 9th Baron Segrave, 8th Baron Mowbray (Earl 1405–1432)	Margaret de Mowbray c. 1388–1459	Robert Howard; 1385–1436	Isabel de Mowbray c. 1400–1452	Thomas FitzAlan; 1381–1415; 5th (or 10th) Earl of Arundel, 10th Earl of Surrey	John Fitzalan; 1385–1421; 6th (or 11th) Earl of Arundel, 3rd Baron Arundel, 3rd Baron Maltravers
Duke of Norfolk (4th creation), 1483
William Stourton a. 1426–1478; 2nd Baron Stourton (Baron 1462–1478)	John de Mowbray; 1415–1461; 3rd Duke of Norfolk, 6th Earl of Norfolk, 10th Baron Segrave, 9th Baron Mowbray (Duke 1432–1461)	John Howard; 1425–1485; 1st Duke of Norfolk, 13th Baron Segrave, 12th Baron Mowbray (Duke 1483–1485)	John Fitzalan; 1408–1435; 7th (or 12th) Earl of Arundel, 4th Baron Arundel, 4th Baron Maltravers	William Fitzalan; 1417–1487; 9th (or 14th) Earl of Arundel, 6th Baron Arundel, 6th Baron Maltravers
Titles forfeit, 1485
Earl of Surrey (2nd creation), 1451	Duke of Norfolk (4th creation) restored and Earl of Surrey, 1514
John Stourton c. 1454–1485; 3rd Baron Stourton (Baron 1479–1485)	William Stourton c. 1457–1524; 5th Baron Stourton (Baron 1487–1524)	John de Mowbray; 1444–1476; 4th Duke of Norfolk, 7th Earl of Norfolk, 11th Baron Segrave, 10th Baron Mowbray (Duke 1461–1476), Earl of Surrey (Earl 1451–1476)	King Edward IV; 1442–1483	Thomas Howard; 1443–1524; 2nd Duke of Norfolk, 1st Earl of Surrey (Duke 1514–1524)	Humfrey Fitzalan; 1429–1438; 8th (or 13th) Earl of Arundel, 5th Baron Arundel, 5th Baron Maltravers	Thomas Fitzalan; 1450–1524; 10th (or 15th) Earl of Arundel, 7th Baron Arundel, 7th Baron Maltravers
Dukedom of Norfolk, Earldom of Nottingham, Earldom of Surrey extinct, 1476
Duke of Norfolk (3rd creation), Earl of Nottingham (3rd creation), and Earl of Surrey, 1477
Francis Stourton; 1485–1487; 4th Baron Stourton (Baron 1485–1487)	Edward Stourton; 1463–1535; 6th Baron Stourton (Baron 1524–1535)	Anne de Mowbray; 1472–1481; 8th Countess of Norfolk, 12th Baroness Segrave, 11th Baroness Mowbray (Countess 1476–1481)	Richard of Shrewsbury; 1473–1483; Duke of York, Duke of Norfolk, Earl of Nottingham, Earl of Warenne (Duke 1477–1483)	Anne of York; 1475–1511	Thomas Howard; 1473–1554; 3rd Duke of Norfolk, 2nd Earl of Surrey (Duke 1524–1554)	Edmund Howard c. 1478–1539	Elizabeth Boleyn c. 1480–1538	William Fitzalan; 1476–1544; 11th (or 16th) Earl of Arundel, 8th Baron Arundel, 8th Baron Maltravers
Earldom of Norfolk extinct and Baronies Segrave and Mowbray in abeyance, 1481	Dukedom of Norfolk, Earldom of Nottingham, Earldom of Surrey extinct, 1483	Attainted, 1547; Restored, 1553
William Stourton c. 1505–1548; 7th Baron Stourton	Earl of Nottingham (5th creation), 1525	King Henry VIII; 1491–1547	Anne Boleyn c. 1501 or 1507–1536
Viscount Howard of Bindon, 1559
Charles Stourton c. 1520–1557; 8th Baron Stourton	Henry Howard; 1517–1547 styled Earl of Surrey	Thomas Howard c. 1520–1582; 1st Viscount Howard of Bindon	Mary FitzRoy; 1519–1557	Henry FitzRoy; 1519–1536; Duke of Richmond and Somerset, Earl of Nottingham	Catherine Howard c. 1524–1542	Henry Fitzalan; 1512–1580; 12th (or 17th) Earl of Arundel, 9th Baron Arundel, 9th Baron Maltravers
Earldom of Nottingham extinct, 1536
Thomas Howard; 1536–1572; 4th Duke of Norfolk, 3rd Earl of Surrey, 13th Baron Mowbray (Duke 1554–1572)	Henry Howard; 1540–1614; Earl of Northampton	Queen Elizabeth I 1533–1603	Mary FitzAlan; 1540–1557
Dukedom (3rd creation) forfeit, 1572
Earl of Arundel (3rd creation), 1580	Earl of Suffolk (4th creation), 1603
John Stourton; 1553–1588; 9th Baron Stourton	Edward Stourton c. 1555–1633; 10th Baron Stourton	Philip Howard; 1557–1595; 20th/13th/1st Earl of Arundel, styled Earl of Surrey	Thomas Howard; 1561–1626; Earl of Suffolk	Lord William Howard; 1563–1640
Earldom of Arundel and Barony of Mowbray attainted, 1589	see Earls, Marquesses, and Dukes of Suffolk family tree
Earl of Arundel (3rd creation) and Barony of Mowbray restored, 1604; Earl of Norfolk (5th creation), 1644
William Stourton c. 1594–1672; 11th Baron Stourton	Thomas Howard; 1585–1646; 21st/14th/2nd Earl of Arundel, 2nd/4th Earl of Surrey, 1st Earl of Norfolk, 14th Baron Mowbray (Earl 1644–1646)	Philip
see Earls of Shrewsbury family tree
Edward Stourton; 1617–1644	Alethea Talbot; 1585–1654; 17th Baroness Strange of Blackmere, 14th Baroness Talbot, 13th Baroness Furnivall	Henry Frederick Howard; 1608–1652; 22nd/15th/3rd Earl of Arundel, 3rd/5th Earl of Surrey, 2nd Earl of Norfolk, 15th Baron Mowbray (Earl 1646–1652)	William Howard; 1614–1680; Viscount Stafford	William
Duke of Norfolk (4th creation restored), 1660	Baron Howard of Castle Rising, 1669; Earl of Norwich (3rd creation), 1672
William Stourton d. 1685; 12th Baron Stourton	Thomas Howard; 1627–1677; 5th Duke of Norfolk, 21st/14th/2nd Earl of Arundel, 4th/6th Earl of Surrey, 16th Baron Mowbray (Duke 1660–1677) 18th Baron Strange of Blackmere, 15th Baron Talbot, 14th Baron Furnivall (Baron 1654–1677)	Henry Howard; 1628–1684; 6th Duke of Norfolk, 22nd/15th/3rd Earl of Arundel, 5th/7th Earl of Surrey; 18th Baron Strange of Blackmere, 17th Baron Mowbray, 15th Baron Talbot, 14th Baron Furnivall (Duke 1677–1684) 1st Earl of Norwich, etc. (Earl 1672–1684)	Charles Howard; 1630–1713	Col. Bernard Howard; 1641–1717	Charles Howard; 1628–1685; Earl of Carlisle
Edward Stourton; 1665–1720; 13th Baron Stourton	Thomas Stourton; 1667–1744; 14th Baron Stourton	Charles Stourton; 1669–1739	Henry Howard; 1655–1701; 7th Duke of Norfolk, 22nd/15th/3rd Earl of Arundel, 5th/7th Earl of Surrey, 2nd Earl of Norwich, etc. 18th Baron Mowbray, 19th Baron Strange of Blackmere, 15th Baron Talbot, 14th Baron Furnivall (Duke 1684–1701)	Lord Thomas Howard; 1662–1689	Henry Charles Howard d. 1720
Thomas Howard; 1683–1732; 8th Duke of Norfolk, 23rd/16th/4th Earl of Arundel, 6th/8th Earl of Surrey, 3rd Earl of Norwich, etc. 18th Baron Strange of Blackmere, 15th Baron Talbot, 14th Baron Furnivall, 19th Baron Mowbray (Duke 1701–1732)	Edward Howard; 1685–1777; 9th Duke of Norfolk, 24th/17th/5th Earl of Arundel, 7th/9th Earl of Surrey, 4th Earl of Norwich, etc. 20th Baron Mowbray, 20th Baron Strange of Blackmere, 15th Baron Talbot, 14th Baron Furnivall (Duke 1732–1777)	Philip Howard; 1688–1750	Bernard Howard; 1674–1735
Earldom of Norwich (3rd creation) and Barony of Howard of Castle Rising extinct and Baronies of Furnivall, Mowbray, Segrave, Strange of Blackmere, and Talbot abeyant, 1777
Charles Stourton; 1702–1753; 15th Baron Stourton	William Stourton; 1704–1781; 16th Baron Stourton	Winifred Howard; 1726–1753	Anne Howard; 1742–1787	Charles Howard; 1720–1786; 10th Duke of Norfolk, 25th/18th/6th Earl of Arundel, 8th/10th Earl of Surrey (Duke 1777–1786)	Henry Howard; 1713–1787
Charles Philip Stourton; 1752–1816; 17th Baron Stourton	Charles Howard; 1746–1815; 11th Duke of Norfolk, 26th/19th/7th Earl of Arundel, 9th/11th Earl of Surrey (Duke 1786–1815)
William Stourton; 1776–1846; 18th Baron Stourton	Bernard Howard; 1765–1842; 12th Duke of Norfolk, 27th/20th/8th Earl of Arundel, 10th/12th Earl of Surrey (Duke 1815–1842)	Henry Howard-Molyneux-Howard; 1766–1824
Charles Stourton; 1802–1872; 19th Baron Stourton	Henry Howard; 1791–1856; 13th Duke of Norfolk, 28th/21st/9th Earl of Arundel, 11th/13th Earl of Surrey (Duke 1842–1856)	Henry Howard-Molyneux-Howard; 1802–1875
Baron Mowbray and Baron Segrave abeayance restored, 1878	Baron Howard of Glossop, 1869
Alfred Joseph Stourton; 1829–1893; 24th Baron Segrave, 21st/23rd Baron Mowbray, 20th Baron Stourton	Henry Granville Fitzalan-Howard; 1815–1860; 14th Duke of Norfolk, 29th/22nd/10th Earl of Arundel, 12th/14th Earl of Surrey (Duke 1856–1860)	Edward George Fitzalan-Howard; 1818–1883; 1st Baron Howard of Glossop
Baron Howard of Penrith, 1830
Charles Botolph Joseph Stourton; 1867–1936; 25th Baron Segrave, 22nd/24th Baron Mowbray, 21st Baron Stourton	Henry Fitzalan-Howard; 1847–1917; 15th Duke of Norfolk, 30th/23rd/11th Earl of Arundel, 13th/15th Earl of Surrey, Lord Maltravers, Earl of Arundel and Surrey (Duke 1860–1917)	Francis Fitzalan-Howard; 1859–1924; 2nd Baron Howard of Glossop	Esmé Howard; 1863–1939; 1st Baron Howard of Penrith
William Marmaduke Stourton; 1895–1965; 26th Baron Segrave, 23rd/25th Baron Mowbray, 22nd Baron Stourton	Bernard Fitzalan-Howard; 1908–1975; 16th Duke of Norfolk, 31st/24th/12th Earl of Arundel, 14th/16th Earl of Surrey (Duke 1917–1975)	Bernard Edward Fitzalan-Howard; 1885–1972; 3rd Baron Howard of Glossop	Francis Howard; 1905–1999; 2nd Baron Howard of Penrith
Charles Edward Stourton; 1923–2006; 27th Baron Segrave, 24th/26th Baron Mowbray, 23rd Baron Stourton	Miles Fitzalan-Howard; 1915–2002; 17th Duke of Norfolk, 32nd/25th/13th Earl of Arundel, 15th/17th Earl of Surrey, 4th Baron Howard of Glossop (Duke 1975–2002) m. Mary Teresa Constable-Maxwell
Edward William Stephen Stourton; 1953–2021; 28th Baron Segrave, 25th/27th Baron Mowbray, 24th Baron Stourton	Marsha Howard b. 1953	Edward Fitzalan-Howard b. 1956; 18th Duke of Norfolk, 33rd/26th/14th Earl of Arundel, 16th/18th Earl of Surrey, 5th Baron Howard of Glossop (from 2002) m. Georgina Susan Gore	Philip Esmé Howard b. 1945; 3rd Baron Howard of Penrith
Sarah Louise Stourton b. 1982	Isabella Laura Stourton b. 1983	Camilla Charlotte Stourton b. 1987	Francesca Jane Stourton b. 1988	James Charles Peter Stourton b. 1991; 29th Baron Segrave, 26th/28th Baron Mowbray, 25th Baron Stourton	Henry Fitzalan-Howard b. 1987 styled Earl of Arundel and Surrey	Thomas Philip Howard b. 1974
Co-heir presumptive to the Baronies Segrave, Mowbray, and Stourton	Co-heir presumptive to the Baronies Segrave, Mowbray, and Stourton	Co-heir presumptive to the Baronies Segrave, Mowbray, and Stourton	Co-heir presumptive to the Baronies Segrave, Mowbray, and Stourton	Heir apparent to the dukedom	Heir apparent to the Barony Howard of Penrith

=== Earl of Nottingham, Third creation (1476) ===
- Richard of Shrewsbury, 1st Duke of York (1473–1483)

=== Earl of Nottingham, Fourth creation (1483) ===
- William Berkeley, 1st Marquess of Berkeley (1426–1492)

Family tree of the Barons Berkeley of the Berkeley family

Robert Fitzharding "Robert the Devout" c. 1095–1170; 1st Feudal Baron of Berkeley
Maurice FitzRobert FitzHarding "Maurice the Make-Peace" c. 1120–1190/1191; 2nd Feudal Baron of Berkeley
Robert de Berkeley "Robert the Observer or Temporiser" c. 1165–1220; 3rd Feudal Baron of Berkeley	Thomas I de Berkeley "Thomas the Observer or Temporiser" c. 1170–1243; 4th Feudal Baron of Berkeley
Maurice de Berkeley "Maurice the Resolute"; 1218–1281; 5th Feudal Baron of Berkeley
Baron Berkeley (1st creation by writ), 1295
Thomas de Berkeley "Thomas the Wise"; 1245–1321; 1st Baron Berkeley, 6th Feudal Baron of Berkeley
Maurice de Berkeley "Maurice the Magnanimous"; 1271–1326; 2nd Baron Berkeley, 7th Feudal Baron of Berkeley
Bruton cadet branch
Thomas de Berkeley "Thomas the Rich" c. 1293/1296–1361; 3rd Baron Berkeley, 8th Feudal Baron of Berkeley	Maurice de Berkeley; 1298–1347
Maurice de Berkeley "Maurice the Valiant"; 1320–1368; 4th Baron Berkeley, 9th Feudal Baron of Berkeley	Thomas Berkeley; 1333–1361
Thomas de Berkeley "Thomas the Magnificent"; 1353–1417; 5th Baron Berkeley, 10th Feudal Baron of Berkeley	James de Berkeley d. 1405	Maurice Berkeley d. 1400
Barony Berkeley (1st creation by writ) extinct, 1417
Baron Berkeley (2nd creation by writ), 1421
Elizabeth Berkeley, Countess of Warwick; 1386–1422	James Berkeley "James the Just" c. 1394–1463; 1st Baron Berkeley, 11th Feudal Baron of Berkeley	Maurice Berkeley; 1401–1464
Viscount Berkeley, 1481; Earl of Nottingham (4th creation), 1483; Marquess of Berkeley, 1489	Barony Berkeley disinherited, 1492
William de Berkeley "William the Waste-All"; 1426–1492; Marquess of Berkeley, etc., 2nd Baron Berkeley, 12th Feudal Baron of Berkeley	Maurice Berkeley "Maurice the Lawyer"; 1436–1506 de jure 3rd Baron Berkeley, 13th Feudal Baron of Berkeley	William Berkeley; 1433–1501
Marquessate of Berkeley, Earldom of Nottingham (4th creation), and Viscountcy Berkeley extinct, 1492
Maurice Berkeley "Maurice the Courtier"; 1467–1523 de jure 4th Baron Berkeley, 14th Feudal Baron of Berkeley	Thomas Berkeley "Thomas the Sheepmaster"; 1472–1533 de jure 5th Baron Berkeley, 15th Feudal Baron of Berkeley	Richard Berkeley; 1470–1514
Thomas Berkeley "Thomas the Hopeful"; 1505–1534 de jure 6th Baron Berkeley, 16th Feudal Baron of Berkeley	Maurice Berkeley by 1514–1581
Henry Berkeley "Henry the Harmless"; 1534–1613 de jure 7th Baron Berkeley, 17th Feudal Baron of Berkeley	Henry Berkeley d. 1601
Baron Berkeley de facto, 1553
Anne Savage c. 1496–1564	Thomas Berkeley; 1575–1611	Maurice Berkeley d. 1617
Succeeded to predeceased son's title	Baron Berkeley of Stratton, 1658
George Berkeley; 1601–1658; 8th Baron Berkeley, 18th Feudal Baron of Berkeley	Charles Berkeley; 1599–1666; 2nd Viscount Fitzhardinge, etc.	John Berkeley; 1602–1678; 1st Baron Berkeley of Stratton
Earl of Berkeley and Viscount Dursley, 1679	Viscount Fitzhardinge and Baron Berkeley of Rathdowne, 1663; Earl of Falmouth, 1664
George Berkeley; 1627–1698; 1st Earl of Berkeley, etc., 9th Baron Berkeley, 19th Feudal Baron of Berkeley	Maurice Berkeley; 1628–1690; 3rd Viscount Fitzhardinge, etc.	Charles Berkeley; 1630–1665; 1st Earl of Falmouth, 1st Viscount Fitzhardinge, etc.	John Berkeley; 1650–1712; 4th Viscount Fitzhardinge, etc.
Feudal barony of Berkley abolished, 1660	Earldom of Falmouth extinct, 1665	Viscountcy Fitzhardinge extinct, 1712
Charles Berkeley; 1649–1710; 2nd Earl of Berkeley, etc., 10th Baron Berkeley	Charles Berkeley; 1662–1681; 2nd Baron Berkeley of Stratton	John Berkeley; 1663–1697; 3rd Baron Berkeley of Stratton	William Berkeley d. 1741; 4th Baron Berkeley of Stratton
James Berkeley after 1679–1736; 3rd Earl of Berkeley, etc., 11th Baron Berkeley	John Berkeley; 1697–1773; 5th Baron Berkeley of Stratton
Barony Berkeley of Stratton extinct, 1773
Augustus Berkeley; 1715–1755; 4th Earl of Berkeley, etc., 12th Baron Berkeley
Frederick Augustus Berkeley; 1745–1810; 5th Earl of Berkeley, etc., 13th Baron Berkeley	George Cranfield Berkeley; 1753–1818
Baron Segrave, 1831; Earl FitzHardinge, 1841	Baron FitzHardinge, 1861
William FitzHardinge Berkeley; 1786–1857; 1st Earl FitzHardinge, etc.	Maurice Frederick FitzHardinge Berkeley; 1788–1867; 1st Baron FitzHardinge	Thomas Moreton FitzHardinge Berkeley; 1796–1882 de jure 6th Earl of Berkeley, etc., 14th Baron Berkeley	Craven FitzHardinge Berkeley; 1805–1855	George Berkeley; 1785–1857
Earldom FitzHardinge and Barony Segrave extinct, 1857
Francis William FitzHardinge Berkeley; 1826–1896; 2nd Baron FitzHardinge	Charles Paget Fitzhardinge Berkeley; 1830–1916; 3rd Baron FitzHardinge	Louisa Mary Berkeley; 1840–1899; 15th Baroness Berkeley	George Lennox Rawdon Berkeley; 1827–1888; 7th Earl of Berkeley, etc.
Barony FitzHardinge extinct, 1916
Illegitimate line	Peerage confirmed, 1891
Eva Mary FitzHardinge Milman; 1875–1964; 16th Baroness Berkeley	Captain Hastings George Fitzhardinge Berkeley; 1855–1934	Randal Thomas Mowbray Berkeley; 1865–1942; 8th Earl of Berkeley, etc.
Barony Berkeley abeyant, 1964	Earldom of Berkeley dormant, 1942
Baron Berkeley abeyance terminated, 1967
Mary Lalle Foley-Berkeley; 1905–1992; 17th Baroness Berkeley	Cynthia Ella Foley; 1909–1991	Sir Lennox Randal Berkeley; 1903–1989
Baron Gueterbock, 2000	Baron Berkeley of Knighton, 2013
Anthony Fitzhardinge Gueterbock b. 1939; 18th Baron Berkeley, Baron Gueterbock	Michael Fitzhardinge Berkeley b. 1948; Baron Berkeley of Knighton

=== Earl of Nottingham, Fifth creation (1525) ===
- Henry FitzRoy, 1st Duke of Richmond and Somerset (1519–1536)

=== Earls of Nottingham, Sixth creation (1596) ===
- see the Earl of Effingham

=== Earls of Nottingham, Seventh creation (1681) ===
see the Earl of Winchilsea and Nottingham

Mansfield and Finch family tree including peerages of Winchilsea and Nottingham

Lord Scone, 1605; Viscount Stormont, 1621	Viscount Maidstone, 1623; Earl of Winchilsea, 1628
David Murray d. 1631; 1st Viscount of Stormont, etc.	Mungo Murray; 1580–1641/1642; 2nd Viscount of Stormont, etc.	Moyle Finch c. 1550–1614; 1st Baronet of Eastwell	Elizabeth Finch; 1556–1634; 1st Countess of Winchilsea and Viscountess Maidstone
David Murray of Balgonie, Fifeshire d. 1628	Thomas Finch; 1578–1639; 2nd Earl of Winchilsea, etc.	Heneage Finch; 1580–1631
Lord Balvaird, 1641
Andrew Murray c. 1597–1644; 1st Lord Balvaird	James Johnstone Murray d. 1658; 2nd Earl of Annandale, etc. 3rd Viscount of Stormont, etc.
Baron FitzHerbert of Eastwell in the County of Kent, 1660	Baron Finch of Daventry, 1673; Earl of Nottingham (7th creation), 1681
David Murray c. 1636–1668; 4th Viscount Stormont, etc., 2nd Lord Balvaird	Heneage Finch c. 1628–1689; 3rd Earl of Winchilsea, etc., 1st Baron FitzHerbert	Heneage Finch; 1620–1682; 1st Earl of Nottingham, etc.
David Murray; 1665–1731; 5th Viscount of Stormont, etc., 3rd Lord Balvaird	Marjory Scott d. 1746	William Finch c. 1651–1672 styled Viscount Maidstone	Heneage Finch; 1657–1726; 5th Earl of Winchilsea, etc., 3rd Baron FitzHerbert	John Finch; 1682/83–1729; 6th Earl of Winchilsea, etc., 4th Baron FitzHerbert	Daniel Finch; 1647–1730; 7th Earl of Winchilsea, etc., 2nd Earl of Nottingham, etc.	Anne Hatton
Barony FitzHerbert extinct, 1729
Baron Mansfield, 1756; Earl of Mansfield, in the County of Nottingham, 1776; Earl of Mansfield, in the County of Middlesex, 1792
David Murray c. 1689–1748; 6th Viscount of Stormont, etc., 4th Lord Balvaird	James Murray c. 1690–1770	Charles Finch; 1672–1712; 4th Earl of Winchilsea, etc.	Marjory Murray d. c. 1765	John Hay of Cromlix; 1691–1740	Daniel Finch; 1689–1769; 8th Earl of Winchilsea, etc. 3rd Earl of Nottingham, etc.	Edward Finch; 1697–1771	Elizabeth Finch; 1704–1784	William Murray; 1705–1793; 1st Earl of Mansfield (in Nottingham and Middlesex)	Amelia Murray d. 1774	Alexander Lindsay; 1683–1762; 3rd Baronet of Evelick
Barony Mansfield extinct, 1793
Louisa Cathcart; 1758–1843; 2nd Countess of Mansfield (in Nottingham)	David Murray; 1727–1796; 2nd Earl of Mansfield (in Middlesex), 7th Viscount of Stormont, etc., 5th Lord Balvaird	Henrietta Frederica Bünau; 1737–1766	George Finch; 1752–1826; 9th Earl of Winchilsea, etc., 4th Earl of Nottingham, etc.	George Finch-Hatton; 1747–1823	David Lindsay c. 1732–1797; 4th Baronet	John Lindsay; 1737–1788	Margaret Lindsay Ramsay c. 1726–1782
Frederica Markham; 1774–1860	David William Murray; 1777–1840; 3rd Earl of Mansfield (in Middlesex), 8th Viscount of Stormont, etc., 6th Lord Balvaird	Henry Murray; 1784–1860	Elizabeth Murray; 1760–1825	William Lindsay d. 1796	Dido Elizabeth Belle; 1761–1804
Frederica Murray; 1800–1823	James Hamilton Stanhope; 1788–1825	William David Murray; 1806–1898; 4th (in Middlesex, 3rd in Nottingham) Earl of Mansfield, 9th Viscount of Stormont, etc., 7th Lord Balvaird	George William Finch-Hatton; 1791–1858; 10th Earl of Winchilsea, etc., 5th Earl of Nottingham, etc.
James Stanhope; 1821–1904	William Stanhope styled Viscount Stormont	George James Finch-Hatton; 1815–1887; 11th Earl of Winchilsea, etc., 6th Earl of Nottingham, etc.	Murray Edward Gordon Finch-Hatton; 1851–1898; 12th Earl of Winchilsea, etc., 7th Earl of Nottingham, etc.	Henry Stormont Finch-Hatton; 1852–1927; 13th Earl of Winchilsea, etc., 8th Earl of Nottingham, etc.
William Murray; 1860–1906; 5th (in Middlesex, 4th in Nottingham) Earl of Mansfield, 10th Viscount of Stormont, etc., 8th Lord Balvaird	Alan Murray; 1864–1935; 6th (in Middlesex, 5th in Nottingham) Earl of Mansfield, 11th Viscount of Stormont, etc., 9th Lord Balvaird	Guy Montagu George Finch-Hatton; 1885–1939; 14th Earl of Winchilsea, etc., 9th Earl of Nottingham, etc.
Mungo David Malcolm Murray; 1900–1971; 7th (in Middlesex, 6th in Nottingham) Earl of Mansfield, 12th Viscount of Stormont, etc., 10th Lord Balvaird	Christopher Guy Heneage Finch-Hatton; 1911–1950; 15th Earl of Winchilsea, etc., 10th Earl of Nottingham, etc.
William David Mungo James Murray; 1930–2015; 8th (in Middlesex, 7th in Nottingham) Earl of Mansfield, 13th Viscount of Stormont, etc., 11th Lord Balvaird	Christopher Denys Stormonte Finch-Hatton; 1936–1999; 16th Earl of Winchilsea, etc., 11th Earl of Nottingham, etc.
Alexander David Mungo Murray b. 1956; 9th (in Middlesex, 8th in Nottingham) Earl of Mansfield, 14th Viscount of Stormont, etc., 12th Lord Balvaird	Daniel James Hatfield Finch-Hatton b. 1967; 17th Earl of Winchilsea, etc., 12th Earl of Nottingham, etc.

== Arms ==
Arms of the Earls of Nottingham

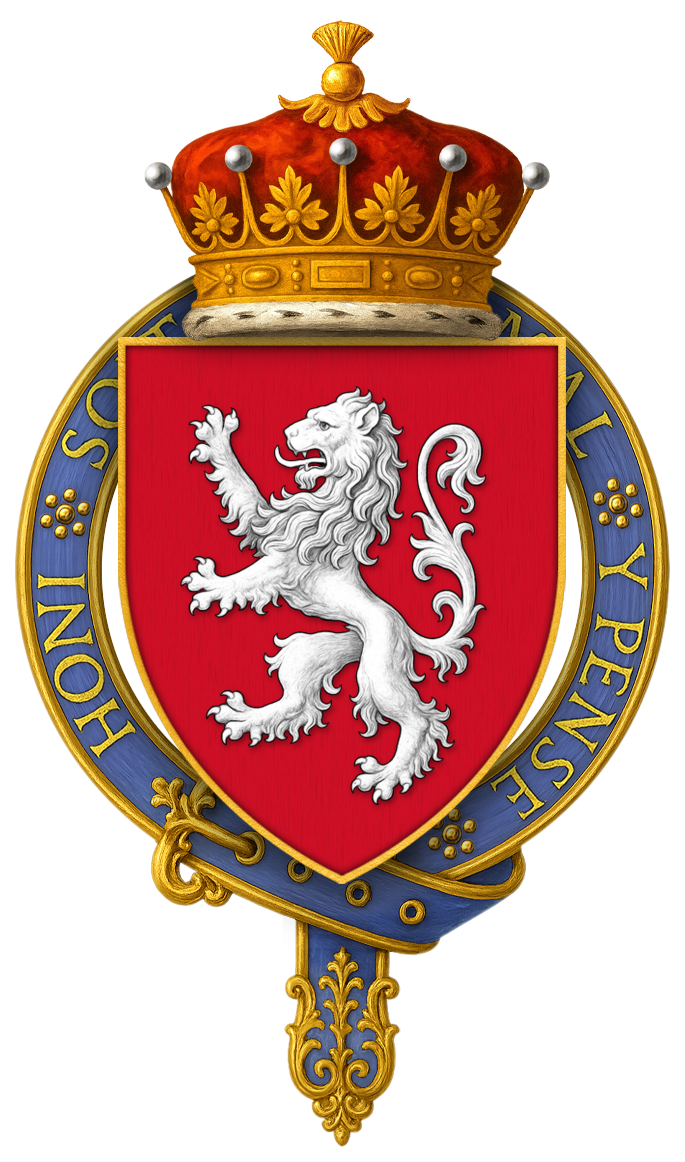
Arms of Thomas Mowbray, Duke of Norfolk and Earl of Nottingham

Arms of Richard of Shrewsbury, 1st Duke of York and Earl of Nottingham

Arms of Henry FitzRoy, 1st Duke of Richmond and Somerset and Earl of Nottingham

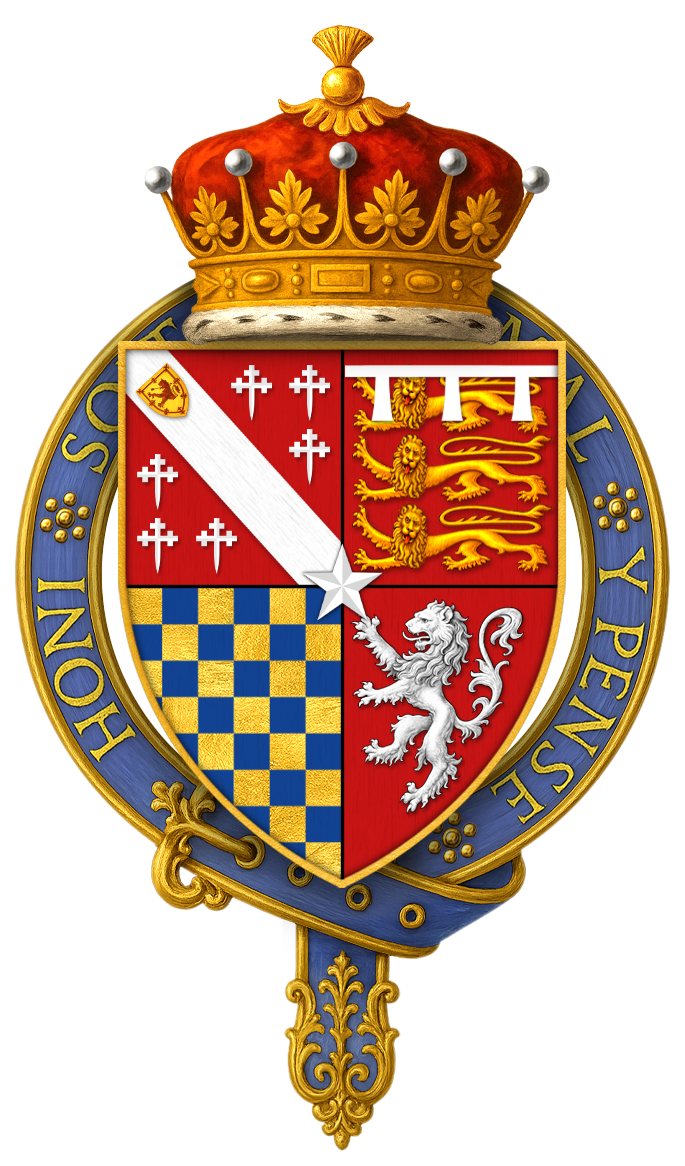
Arms of Charles Howard, 1st Earl of Nottingham
