= Berkeley family =

English family

Arms of the Berkeley family from about 1200: Gules, a chevron between 10 crosses pattée 6 in chief and 4 in base argent. This version is sometimes blazoned as 6 in chief 3 and 3 corner-wise. Motto: Virtute non vi ("By virtue not force").

The Berkeley family is an old English noble family. It is one of the few families in Britain that can trace its patrilineal descent back to a pre-Norman era Anglo-Saxon ancestor, along with the Arden family; the claims of the Swinton family, the Wentworth family, and the Grindlay family are disputed. The Berkeley family still retains possession of many of the lands it has held from the 11th and 12th centuries, centring on Berkeley Castle in Gloucestershire, which still belongs to the family.

== History ==
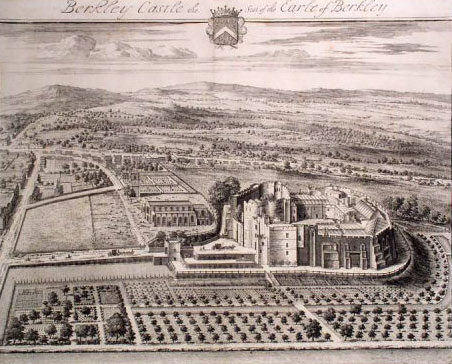
Jan Kip's aerial view of Berkeley Castle engraved for the antiquary Sir Robert Atkyns' The Ancient and Present State of Glostershire, 1712.

The Berkeley family descends in the male line from Robert Fitzharding (d. 1170), 1st feudal baron of Berkeley, Gloucestershire, reputedly the son of Harding of Bristol, the son of Eadnoth the Constable (Alnod), a high official under King Edward the Confessor. His wife was Eva fitz Harding.

Berkeley Castle, the caput of the barony, and the adjoining town of Berkeley are located in the county of Gloucestershire and are situated about five miles west of Dursley and eighteen miles southwest of Gloucester, and northeast of Bristol. The location has conferred various titles on the family over the centuries, including Baron Berkeley (barony by writ), Earl of Berkeley, and Marquess of Berkeley.

The royal manor of Berkeley was originally granted by William the Conqueror to the Norman Roger de Berkeley under the feudal tenure of fee-farm. However, the royal manor was privatized by King Henry II (1154–1189) shortly before he became king. Most of the manor was then re-granted to his supporter and financier the Anglo-Saxon Robert Fitzharding (d. 1170), of Bristol, as a feudal barony. A second barony was also created for the original family who retained their own lands within Berkeley manor as the barony of Dursley.

Shortly afterwards, under the encouragement of Henry II, who had clearly regretted the effect of his dispossession of Roger, the two families were contracted to the intermarriage of the eldest son and heir of each to the other's eldest daughter. Though only the marriage of Maurice FitzHarding and Alice de Berkeley was completed, the heirs of Robert Fitzharding thus adopted the surname "de Berkeley" and established this line as the feudal barons of Berkeley Castle.

Both lines of Berkeleys therefore originated as cousins, but it was the line of the feudal barons of Berkeley, descended from Fitzharding in the male line, which was the more powerful. By both fair means and foul, they acquired the superiority of all the lands in Berkeley in the thirteenth and fourteenth centuries and would go on to play a prominent role in British history in the next several centuries. The original family became extinct in England, but the Scottish Clan Barclay are descended in the male line from the original family.

== Bruton branch ==
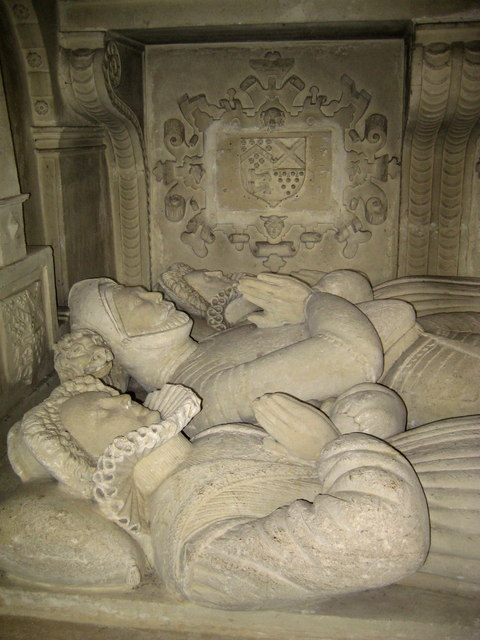
Sir Maurice Berkeley and his two wives, Church of St Mary, Bruton.

Arms of Berkeley of Stoke Gifford: Gules, a chevron ermine between ten crosses pattée six in chief and four in base argent. Also arms of descendants: Berkeley of Bruton, Berkeley of Pylle and Baron Berkeley of Stratton. A difference of Berkeley of Berkeley Castle.

The Bruton branch of the family descends from Sir Maurice Berkeley, a 16th-century politician who rose rapidly in the Tudor court. He came from the Berkeleys of Stoke Gifford, a cadet branch of the main Berkeley family, as a descendant of Sir Maurice de Berkeley (1298–1347), younger son of the 2nd Baron Berkeley. The earlier Sir Maurice, before being killed at the Siege of Calais in 1347, had acquired Stoke Gifford in 1337 and founded the line of Berkeley of Stoke Gifford.

By now a remote cousin of the main line, the Tudor-era Sir Maurice's initial advantage in his career was his mother's second marriage to Sir John FitzJames (who was Lord Chief Justice of the King's Bench from 1526 to 1539). By 1538, this had brought him into the household of Thomas Cromwell, from which he passed into the royal household by 1539. He built a house on the site of Bruton Priory, a spoil of the Dissolution of the Monasteries, incorporating some of the buildings, but this was demolished in 1786.

The Bruton branch produced a number of distinguished figures, including five Barons Berkeley of Stratton (extinct in 1773) and four Viscounts Fitzhardinge (extinct in 1712), as well as William Berkeley, Governor of Virginia. Berkeley Square in London derives its name from this branch.

One of the most notable members of the family was Elizabeth, Princess Berkeley, the only daughter of Augustus Berkeley, 4th Earl of Berkeley (by his wife Elizabeth Drax). She was the widow of William Craven, 6th Baron Craven, and subsequently received the title of Fürstin (Princess) after becoming the morganatic second wife of Alexander, Margrave of Brandenburg-Ansbach, brother of Queen Caroline.

== Family tree ==
Family tree of the Barons Berkeley of the Berkeley family

Robert Fitzharding "Robert the Devout" c. 1095–1170; 1st Feudal Baron of Berkeley
Maurice FitzRobert FitzHarding "Maurice the Make-Peace" c. 1120–1190/1191; 2nd Feudal Baron of Berkeley
Robert de Berkeley "Robert the Observer or Temporiser" c. 1165–1220; 3rd Feudal Baron of Berkeley	Thomas I de Berkeley "Thomas the Observer or Temporiser" c. 1170–1243; 4th Feudal Baron of Berkeley
Maurice de Berkeley "Maurice the Resolute"; 1218–1281; 5th Feudal Baron of Berkeley
Baron Berkeley (1st creation by writ), 1295
Thomas de Berkeley "Thomas the Wise"; 1245–1321; 1st Baron Berkeley, 6th Feudal Baron of Berkeley
Maurice de Berkeley "Maurice the Magnanimous"; 1271–1326; 2nd Baron Berkeley, 7th Feudal Baron of Berkeley
Bruton cadet branch
Thomas de Berkeley "Thomas the Rich" c. 1293/1296–1361; 3rd Baron Berkeley, 8th Feudal Baron of Berkeley	Maurice de Berkeley; 1298–1347
Maurice de Berkeley "Maurice the Valiant"; 1320–1368; 4th Baron Berkeley, 9th Feudal Baron of Berkeley	Thomas Berkeley; 1333–1361
Thomas de Berkeley "Thomas the Magnificent"; 1353–1417; 5th Baron Berkeley, 10th Feudal Baron of Berkeley	James de Berkeley d. 1405	Maurice Berkeley d. 1400
Barony Berkeley (1st creation by writ) extinct, 1417
Baron Berkeley (2nd creation by writ), 1421
Elizabeth Berkeley, Countess of Warwick; 1386–1422	James Berkeley "James the Just" c. 1394–1463; 1st Baron Berkeley, 11th Feudal Baron of Berkeley	Maurice Berkeley; 1401–1464
Viscount Berkeley, 1481; Earl of Nottingham (4th creation), 1483; Marquess of Berkeley, 1489	Barony Berkeley disinherited, 1492
William de Berkeley "William the Waste-All"; 1426–1492; Marquess of Berkeley, etc., 2nd Baron Berkeley, 12th Feudal Baron of Berkeley	Maurice Berkeley "Maurice the Lawyer"; 1436–1506 de jure 3rd Baron Berkeley, 13th Feudal Baron of Berkeley	William Berkeley; 1433–1501
Marquessate of Berkeley, Earldom of Nottingham (4th creation), and Viscountcy Berkeley extinct, 1492
Maurice Berkeley "Maurice the Courtier"; 1467–1523 de jure 4th Baron Berkeley, 14th Feudal Baron of Berkeley	Thomas Berkeley "Thomas the Sheepmaster"; 1472–1533 de jure 5th Baron Berkeley, 15th Feudal Baron of Berkeley	Richard Berkeley; 1470–1514
Thomas Berkeley "Thomas the Hopeful"; 1505–1534 de jure 6th Baron Berkeley, 16th Feudal Baron of Berkeley	Maurice Berkeley by 1514–1581
Henry Berkeley "Henry the Harmless"; 1534–1613 de jure 7th Baron Berkeley, 17th Feudal Baron of Berkeley	Henry Berkeley d. 1601
Baron Berkeley de facto, 1553
Anne Savage c. 1496–1564	Thomas Berkeley; 1575–1611	Maurice Berkeley d. 1617
Succeeded to predeceased son's title	Baron Berkeley of Stratton, 1658
George Berkeley; 1601–1658; 8th Baron Berkeley, 18th Feudal Baron of Berkeley	Charles Berkeley; 1599–1666; 2nd Viscount Fitzhardinge, etc.	John Berkeley; 1602–1678; 1st Baron Berkeley of Stratton
Earl of Berkeley and Viscount Dursley, 1679	Viscount Fitzhardinge and Baron Berkeley of Rathdowne, 1663; Earl of Falmouth, 1664
George Berkeley; 1627–1698; 1st Earl of Berkeley, etc., 9th Baron Berkeley, 19th Feudal Baron of Berkeley	Maurice Berkeley; 1628–1690; 3rd Viscount Fitzhardinge, etc.	Charles Berkeley; 1630–1665; 1st Earl of Falmouth, 1st Viscount Fitzhardinge, etc.	John Berkeley; 1650–1712; 4th Viscount Fitzhardinge, etc.
Feudal barony of Berkley abolished, 1660	Earldom of Falmouth extinct, 1665	Viscountcy Fitzhardinge extinct, 1712
Charles Berkeley; 1649–1710; 2nd Earl of Berkeley, etc., 10th Baron Berkeley	Charles Berkeley; 1662–1681; 2nd Baron Berkeley of Stratton	John Berkeley; 1663–1697; 3rd Baron Berkeley of Stratton	William Berkeley d. 1741; 4th Baron Berkeley of Stratton
James Berkeley after 1679–1736; 3rd Earl of Berkeley, etc., 11th Baron Berkeley	John Berkeley; 1697–1773; 5th Baron Berkeley of Stratton
Barony Berkeley of Stratton extinct, 1773
Augustus Berkeley; 1715–1755; 4th Earl of Berkeley, etc., 12th Baron Berkeley
Frederick Augustus Berkeley; 1745–1810; 5th Earl of Berkeley, etc., 13th Baron Berkeley	George Cranfield Berkeley; 1753–1818
Baron Segrave, 1831; Earl FitzHardinge, 1841	Baron FitzHardinge, 1861
William FitzHardinge Berkeley; 1786–1857; 1st Earl FitzHardinge, etc.	Maurice Frederick FitzHardinge Berkeley; 1788–1867; 1st Baron FitzHardinge	Thomas Moreton FitzHardinge Berkeley; 1796–1882 de jure 6th Earl of Berkeley, etc., 14th Baron Berkeley	Craven FitzHardinge Berkeley; 1805–1855	George Berkeley; 1785–1857
Earldom FitzHardinge and Barony Segrave extinct, 1857
Francis William FitzHardinge Berkeley; 1826–1896; 2nd Baron FitzHardinge	Charles Paget Fitzhardinge Berkeley; 1830–1916; 3rd Baron FitzHardinge	Louisa Mary Berkeley; 1840–1899; 15th Baroness Berkeley	George Lennox Rawdon Berkeley; 1827–1888; 7th Earl of Berkeley, etc.
Barony FitzHardinge extinct, 1916
Illegitimate line	Peerage confirmed, 1891
Eva Mary FitzHardinge Milman; 1875–1964; 16th Baroness Berkeley	Captain Hastings George Fitzhardinge Berkeley; 1855–1934	Randal Thomas Mowbray Berkeley; 1865–1942; 8th Earl of Berkeley, etc.
Barony Berkeley abeyant, 1964	Earldom of Berkeley dormant, 1942
Baron Berkeley abeyance terminated, 1967
Mary Lalle Foley-Berkeley; 1905–1992; 17th Baroness Berkeley	Cynthia Ella Foley; 1909–1991	Sir Lennox Randal Berkeley; 1903–1989
Baron Gueterbock, 2000	Baron Berkeley of Knighton, 2013
Anthony Fitzhardinge Gueterbock b. 1939; 18th Baron Berkeley, Baron Gueterbock	Michael Fitzhardinge Berkeley b. 1948; Baron Berkeley of Knighton

== See also ==
- Anglo-Saxon lineage – the Arden family
- Anglo-Saxon lineage – the Swinton family
- Anglo-Saxon lineage – the Wentworth family
- Anglo-Saxon lineage – the Grindlay family

== Bibliography ==
- Cokayne, G. E., The Complete Peerage, new edition, Vol. 2, pp. 118–149, Berkeley
- Sanders, I. J. English Baronies, Oxford, 1960, p. 13, Berkeley
- Smyth, John. The Lives of the Berkeleys, Lords of the Honour, Castle and Manor of Berkeley from 1066 to 1618, ed. Sir John Maclean, 3 vols., Gloucester, 1883-1885 (first published c. 1628)
  - Vol. 1, 1883
  - Vol. 2, 1883
  - Vol. 3, 1885
