= Viscount Fitzhardinge =

Extinct title in the Peerage of Ireland

Viscount FitzHardinge
- Arms: Gules, a Chevron between ten Crosses-Pattée, six in chief and four in base, Argent. Crest: A Unicorn passant Gules.
- Creation date: 14 July 1663
- Created by: Charles II
- Peerage: Peerage of Ireland
- First holder: Charles Berkeley, 1st Earl of Falmouth
- Last holder: John Berkeley, 4th Viscount Fitzhardinge
- Subsidiary titles: Baron Berkeley, of Rathdowne
- Status: Extinct
- Extinction date: 19 December 1712
- Motto: PAUCA SUSPEXI PAUCIORA DEXPEXI (Few suspected, fewer bargained)

Viscount Fitzhardinge is an extinct title in the Peerage of Ireland. It was created on 14 July 1663 for Charles Berkeley, later Earl of Falmouth, of the Bruton branch of the Berkeley family, with the subsidiary title of Baron Berkeley of Rathdowne, also in the Peerage of Ireland. It passed by special remainder to Charles' father, Charles, then to Maurice, elder brother of the first viscount, and then to their younger brother, John. The title became extinct on John's death in 1712.

== Viscounts Fitzhardinge (1663) ==
- Charles Berkeley, 1st Viscount Fitzhardinge (bef. 1636–1665) (created Earl of Falmouth 1664)
- Charles Berkeley, 2nd Viscount Fitzhardinge (1600–1668)
- Maurice Berkeley, 3rd Viscount Fitzhardinge (1628–1690)
- John Berkeley, 4th Viscount Fitzhardinge (1650–1712)

== Family tree ==
Family tree of the Barons Berkeley of the Berkeley family

Robert Fitzharding "Robert the Devout" c. 1095–1170; 1st Feudal Baron of Berkeley
Maurice FitzRobert FitzHarding "Maurice the Make-Peace" c. 1120–1190/1191; 2nd Feudal Baron of Berkeley
Robert de Berkeley "Robert the Observer or Temporiser" c. 1165–1220; 3rd Feudal Baron of Berkeley	Thomas I de Berkeley "Thomas the Observer or Temporiser" c. 1170–1243; 4th Feudal Baron of Berkeley
Maurice de Berkeley "Maurice the Resolute"; 1218–1281; 5th Feudal Baron of Berkeley
Baron Berkeley (1st creation by writ), 1295
Thomas de Berkeley "Thomas the Wise"; 1245–1321; 1st Baron Berkeley, 6th Feudal Baron of Berkeley
Maurice de Berkeley "Maurice the Magnanimous"; 1271–1326; 2nd Baron Berkeley, 7th Feudal Baron of Berkeley
Bruton cadet branch
Thomas de Berkeley "Thomas the Rich" c. 1293/1296–1361; 3rd Baron Berkeley, 8th Feudal Baron of Berkeley	Maurice de Berkeley; 1298–1347
Maurice de Berkeley "Maurice the Valiant"; 1320–1368; 4th Baron Berkeley, 9th Feudal Baron of Berkeley	Thomas Berkeley; 1333–1361
Thomas de Berkeley "Thomas the Magnificent"; 1353–1417; 5th Baron Berkeley, 10th Feudal Baron of Berkeley	James de Berkeley d. 1405	Maurice Berkeley d. 1400
Barony Berkeley (1st creation by writ) extinct, 1417
Baron Berkeley (2nd creation by writ), 1421
Elizabeth Berkeley, Countess of Warwick; 1386–1422	James Berkeley "James the Just" c. 1394–1463; 1st Baron Berkeley, 11th Feudal Baron of Berkeley	Maurice Berkeley; 1401–1464
Viscount Berkeley, 1481; Earl of Nottingham (4th creation), 1483; Marquess of Berkeley, 1489	Barony Berkeley disinherited, 1492
William de Berkeley "William the Waste-All"; 1426–1492; Marquess of Berkeley, etc., 2nd Baron Berkeley, 12th Feudal Baron of Berkeley	Maurice Berkeley "Maurice the Lawyer"; 1436–1506 de jure 3rd Baron Berkeley, 13th Feudal Baron of Berkeley	William Berkeley; 1433–1501
Marquessate of Berkeley, Earldom of Nottingham (4th creation), and Viscountcy Berkeley extinct, 1492
Maurice Berkeley "Maurice the Courtier"; 1467–1523 de jure 4th Baron Berkeley, 14th Feudal Baron of Berkeley	Thomas Berkeley "Thomas the Sheepmaster"; 1472–1533 de jure 5th Baron Berkeley, 15th Feudal Baron of Berkeley	Richard Berkeley; 1470–1514
Thomas Berkeley "Thomas the Hopeful"; 1505–1534 de jure 6th Baron Berkeley, 16th Feudal Baron of Berkeley	Maurice Berkeley by 1514–1581
Henry Berkeley "Henry the Harmless"; 1534–1613 de jure 7th Baron Berkeley, 17th Feudal Baron of Berkeley	Henry Berkeley d. 1601
Baron Berkeley de facto, 1553
Anne Savage c. 1496–1564	Thomas Berkeley; 1575–1611	Maurice Berkeley d. 1617
Succeeded to predeceased son's title	Baron Berkeley of Stratton, 1658
George Berkeley; 1601–1658; 8th Baron Berkeley, 18th Feudal Baron of Berkeley	Charles Berkeley; 1599–1666; 2nd Viscount Fitzhardinge, etc.	John Berkeley; 1602–1678; 1st Baron Berkeley of Stratton
Earl of Berkeley and Viscount Dursley, 1679	Viscount Fitzhardinge and Baron Berkeley of Rathdowne, 1663; Earl of Falmouth, 1664
George Berkeley; 1627–1698; 1st Earl of Berkeley, etc., 9th Baron Berkeley, 19th Feudal Baron of Berkeley	Maurice Berkeley; 1628–1690; 3rd Viscount Fitzhardinge, etc.	Charles Berkeley; 1630–1665; 1st Earl of Falmouth, 1st Viscount Fitzhardinge, etc.	John Berkeley; 1650–1712; 4th Viscount Fitzhardinge, etc.
Feudal barony of Berkley abolished, 1660	Earldom of Falmouth extinct, 1665	Viscountcy Fitzhardinge extinct, 1712
Charles Berkeley; 1649–1710; 2nd Earl of Berkeley, etc., 10th Baron Berkeley	Charles Berkeley; 1662–1681; 2nd Baron Berkeley of Stratton	John Berkeley; 1663–1697; 3rd Baron Berkeley of Stratton	William Berkeley d. 1741; 4th Baron Berkeley of Stratton
James Berkeley after 1679–1736; 3rd Earl of Berkeley, etc., 11th Baron Berkeley	John Berkeley; 1697–1773; 5th Baron Berkeley of Stratton
Barony Berkeley of Stratton extinct, 1773
Augustus Berkeley; 1715–1755; 4th Earl of Berkeley, etc., 12th Baron Berkeley
Frederick Augustus Berkeley; 1745–1810; 5th Earl of Berkeley, etc., 13th Baron Berkeley	George Cranfield Berkeley; 1753–1818
Baron Segrave, 1831; Earl FitzHardinge, 1841	Baron FitzHardinge, 1861
William FitzHardinge Berkeley; 1786–1857; 1st Earl FitzHardinge, etc.	Maurice Frederick FitzHardinge Berkeley; 1788–1867; 1st Baron FitzHardinge	Thomas Moreton FitzHardinge Berkeley; 1796–1882 de jure 6th Earl of Berkeley, etc., 14th Baron Berkeley	Craven FitzHardinge Berkeley; 1805–1855	George Berkeley; 1785–1857
Earldom FitzHardinge and Barony Segrave extinct, 1857
Francis William FitzHardinge Berkeley; 1826–1896; 2nd Baron FitzHardinge	Charles Paget Fitzhardinge Berkeley; 1830–1916; 3rd Baron FitzHardinge	Louisa Mary Berkeley; 1840–1899; 15th Baroness Berkeley	George Lennox Rawdon Berkeley; 1827–1888; 7th Earl of Berkeley, etc.
Barony FitzHardinge extinct, 1916
Illegitimate line	Peerage confirmed, 1891
Eva Mary FitzHardinge Milman; 1875–1964; 16th Baroness Berkeley	Captain Hastings George Fitzhardinge Berkeley; 1855–1934	Randal Thomas Mowbray Berkeley; 1865–1942; 8th Earl of Berkeley, etc.
Barony Berkeley abeyant, 1964	Earldom of Berkeley dormant, 1942
Baron Berkeley abeyance terminated, 1967
Mary Lalle Foley-Berkeley; 1905–1992; 17th Baroness Berkeley	Cynthia Ella Foley; 1909–1991	Sir Lennox Randal Berkeley; 1903–1989
Baron Gueterbock, 2000	Baron Berkeley of Knighton, 2013
Anthony Fitzhardinge Gueterbock b. 1939; 18th Baron Berkeley, Baron Gueterbock	Michael Fitzhardinge Berkeley b. 1948; Baron Berkeley of Knighton

== See also ==
- Earl of Falmouth
- Baron Berkeley
- Baron Berkeley of Stratton
- Earl FitzHardinge
- Baron FitzHardinge
