= Maurice Berkeley =

Maurice Berkeley or Maurice de Berkeley may refer to:

== Berkeley of Berkeley Castle, Gloucestershire ==
- Maurice de Berkeley "the Resolute" (1218–1281), 8th (feudal) Baron de Berkeley, English soldier and rebel
- Maurice de Berkeley, 2nd Baron Berkeley (1271–1326)
- Maurice de Berkeley, 4th Baron Berkeley (c. 1330–1368)
- Maurice Berkeley, 3rd Baron Berkeley (1435–1506)
- Maurice Berkeley, 1st Baron FitzHardinge (1788–1867), illegitimate son of Frederick Berkeley, 5th Earl of Berkeley

== Berkeley of Stoke Gifford, Gloucestershire (Junior branch of Berkeley of Berkeley Castle) ==
- Maurice Berkeley (1358–1400), of Stoke Gifford, MP for Gloucestershire
- Maurice Berkeley (1401–1464), MP for Gloucestershire in 1425 and 1429
- Maurice Berkeley (1599–1654) of Stoke Gifford, MP for Gloucestershire, and for Great Bedwyn

== Berkeley of Bruton, Somerset (Junior branch of Berkeley of Stoke Gifford) ==
- Maurice Berkeley (died 1581), MP for Somerset, and for Bletchingley
- Maurice Berkeley, 3rd Viscount Fitzhardinge (1628–1690), MP for Wells 1661–1679 and Bath 1681–1690
- Maurice Berkeley (died 1617) (c. 1577–c. 1617), MP for Truro, for Somerset, and for Minehead

== Berkeley of Pylle, Somerset (Junior branch of Berkeley of Bruton) ==
- Maurice Berkeley Portman (1833–1888), political figure in Canada West
- Maurice Berkeley (died 1717), of Pylle, Somerset, MP for Wells 1705–8 and 1710–6
