= Baron Berkeley =

Title in the Peerage of England

Arms of Berkeley: Gules, a chevron between ten crosses pattée six in chief and four in base argent. Motto: Virtute non Vi, "By virtue not by force"

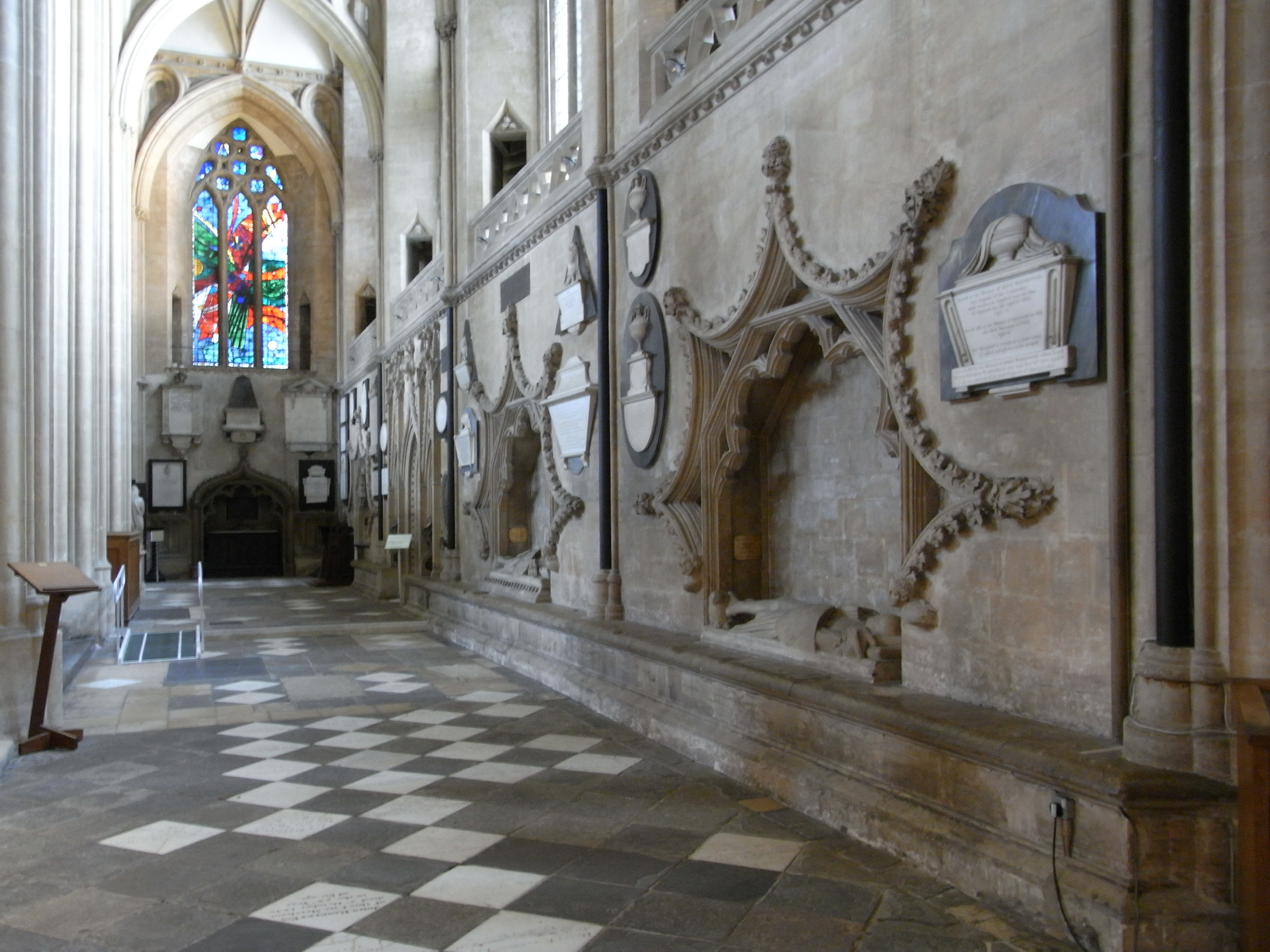
Three Berkeley tombs in St Augustine's Abbey, Bristol (now Bristol Cathedral), founded by Robert FitzHarding, 1st. feudal baron. South wall of the south aisle, looking eastward, in receding order: 4th. feudal baron (1243), 7th. feudal baron (1326), 6th. feudal baron (1321). A further chest tomb exists in the Lady Chapel with effigies of the 9th feudal baron (1368) and his mother Margaret Mortimer, Baroness Berkeley (d.1337). Many other Barons Berkeley are buried here.

The title Baron Berkeley originated as a feudal title and was subsequently created twice in the Peerage of England by writ. It was first granted by writ to Thomas de Berkeley, 1st Baron Berkeley (1245–1321), 6th feudal Baron Berkeley, in 1295, but the title of that creation became extinct at the death of his great-great-grandson, the fifth Baron by writ, when no male heirs to the barony by writ remained, although the feudal barony continued. The next creation by writ was in 1421, for the last baron's nephew and heir James Berkeley. His son and successor William was created Viscount Berkeley in 1481, Earl of Nottingham in 1483, and Marquess of Berkeley in 1488. He had no surviving male issue, so the Marquessate and his other non-inherited titles became extinct on his death in 1491, whilst the barony passed de jure to his younger brother Maurice. However, William had disinherited Maurice because he considered him to have brought shame on the noble House of Berkeley by marrying beneath his status to Isabel, daughter of Philip Mead of Wraxhall, an Alderman and Mayor of Bristol. Instead, he bequeathed the castle, lands and lordships comprising the Barony of Berkeley to King Henry VII and his heirs male, failing which to descend to William's own rightful heirs. Thus on the death of King Edward VI in 1553, Henry VII's unmarried grandson, the Berkeley inheritance returned to the family. Therefore, Maurice and his descendants from 1492 to 1553 were de jure barons only, until the return of the title to the senior heir Henry (and indirectly to his mother Anne), becoming de facto 7th Baron in 1553. Upon his death he was succeeded by his relative George Harding.

His son, the ninth Baron, was created in 1679 Earl of Berkeley and Viscount Dursley, which remained united to the barony until the death of the sixth Earl in 1882, when the earldom passed to a male heir and the barony passed to a female one, Louisa Milman. At Louisa's death, the barony went to Eva Mary Foley, upon whose death the barony fell into abeyance. The abeyance was terminated a few years later in favour of Mary Lalle Foley-Berkeley. Upon her death, the barony went to her nephew Anthony Gueterbock, who is the present holder. In 2000, he was created Baron Gueterbock for life in the Peerage of the United Kingdom. The epithets of each baron were coined by John Smith of Nibley (d.1641), steward of the Berkeley estates, the biographer of the family and author of "Lives of the Berkeleys".

== Feudal Barons of Berkeley ==
The feudal barony of Berkeley was created c. 1155, when King Henry II granted the royal castle of Berkeley to the Anglo-Saxon royal financier Robert Fitzharding under the feudal land tenure per baroniam.

Prior to that time, Berkeley Castle had been held in fee-farm by Roger I "de Berkeley" (d.1093), a Norman nobleman, possibly a son of Roger I of Tosny (died c. 1040), who acquired the surname "de Berkeley". Roger I "de Berkeley" held extensive lands in-chief of the king in 1086, as recorded by Domesday Book, including Dursley and retired as a monk to St Peter's Abbey, Gloucester in about 1091. His son Roger II (d. about 1131) and grandson Roger III (d. after 1177) also held the manor of Dursley in-chief of the king. In 1152 Roger III was deprived of the farm of Berkeley during the civil war between King Stephen and the Empress Maud. He was later restored to Dursley, and founded the family of "Berkeley of Dursley", but Berkeley Castle was granted by barony to Robert FitzHarding, a native Englishman and royal financier of Bristol, whose family also took the name "de Berkeley". To mollify the ill feelings of Roger of Dursley, Henry II encouraged each family to marry their respective male heirs to the eldest daughters of the other, which was successfully accomplished. The epithets below were assigned by John Smith (d.1640) of Nibley, household steward of the Berkeleys and author of Lives of the Berkeleys:

- Robert FitzHarding, 1st feudal baron of Berkeley (d.1170/1) Robert the Devout.
- Maurice FitzRobert FitzHarding, 2nd feudal baron of Berkeley (c. 1120–1190/1) (otherwise "Maurice I de Berkeley") Maurice the Make-Peace, son, who in accordance with the wishes of King Henry II married Alice de Berkeley, eldest daughter of Roger III "de Berkeley" (d. after 1177) of Dursley.
- Robert de Berkeley, 3rd feudal baron of Berkeley (c. 1165–1220) Robert the Rebellious, son
- Thomas I de Berkeley, 4th feudal baron of Berkeley (c. 1170–1243) Thomas the Observer or Temporiser, brother
- Maurice II de Berkeley, 5th feudal baron of Berkeley (1218–1281) Maurice the Resolute, son

== Barons Berkeley, by writ, First Creation (1295) ==
From 1295 the feudal barony continued concurrently with the barony by writ. The feudal barony continued until the Tenures Abolition Act 1660. The feudal barony of Berkeley is especially important in that the barony by writ was deemed, extraordinarily, to be in effect a feudal barony (or barony by tenure), dependent on the tenure of Berkeley Castle. Thus when William Berkeley, 1st Marquess of Berkeley, 2nd Baron Berkeley (1426–1492), William the Waste-All, alienated Berkeley Castle to the king, he effectively disinherited his younger brother from the barony by writ.

- Thomas de Berkeley, 1st Baron Berkeley, 6th feudal baron of Berkeley (1245–1321) Thomas the Wise, son.
- Maurice de Berkeley, 2nd Baron Berkeley, 7th feudal baron of Berkeley (1271–1326), Maurice the Magnanimous, son.
- Thomas de Berkeley, 3rd Baron Berkeley, 8th feudal baron of Berkeley (1293/6–1361) Thomas the Rich, son.
- Maurice de Berkeley, 4th Baron Berkeley, 9th feudal baron of Berkeley (1320–1368) Maurice the Valiant, son.
- Thomas de Berkeley, 5th Baron Berkeley, 10th feudal baron of Berkeley (1353–1417) Thomas the Magnificent, son, died without male progeny.

== Barons Berkeley, by writ, Second Creation (1421) ==
- James Berkeley, 1st Baron Berkeley (c. 1394–1463), James the Just, nephew and heir male.
- William Berkeley, 1st Marquess of Berkeley, 2nd Baron Berkeley (1426–1492), William the Waste-All, son.
- Maurice Berkeley, de jure 3rd Baron Berkeley (1436–1506), Maurice the Lawyer, brother.
- Maurice Berkeley, de jure 4th Baron Berkeley (1467–1523), Maurice the Courtier, son. Died without legitimate progeny.
- Thomas Berkeley, de jure 5th Baron Berkeley (1472–1533), Thomas the Sheepmaster, brother.
- Thomas Berkeley, de jure 6th Baron Berkeley (1505–1534), Thomas the Hopeful, son.
- Henry Berkeley, 7th Baron Berkeley (1534–1613), Henry the Harmless / Posthumous Henry, posthumous son.
- George Berkeley, 8th Baron Berkeley (1601–1658), grandson. (No epithets coined after the death of John Smith (d.1640) of Nibley)
- George Berkeley, 1st Earl of Berkeley, 9th Baron Berkeley (1627–1698), son (created Earl of Berkeley in 1679)
- Charles Berkeley, 2nd Earl of Berkeley, 10th Baron Berkeley (1649–1710)
- James Berkeley, 3rd Earl of Berkeley, 11th Baron Berkeley (1680–1736)
- Augustus Berkeley, 4th Earl of Berkeley, 12th Baron Berkeley (1716–1755)
- Frederick Augustus Berkeley, 5th Earl of Berkeley, 13th Baron Berkeley (1745–1810)
- Thomas Moreton Fitzhardinge Berkeley, 6th Earl of Berkeley,14th Baron Berkeley (1796–1882)
- Louisa Mary Milman (Berkeley), 15th Baroness Berkeley (1840–1899)
- Eva Foley (Milman),16th Baroness Berkeley(1875–1964) (abeyant 1964)
- Mary Lalle Foley-Berkeley, 17th Baroness Berkeley (1905–1992) (abeyance terminated 1967)
- Anthony Fitzhardinge Gueterbock, 18th Baron Berkeley (b. 1939), her nephew

The heir apparent is his son Thomas FitzHardinge Gueterbock (b. 1969)

== Earls of Berkeley (after 1882, continuing the creation of 1679) ==
The Earldom of Berkeley, together with the Viscountcy of Dursley, was separated from the barony in 1882, but the succession was not fully established. In 1942 both titles became extinct or dormant.

- George Lennox Rawdon Berkeley, 7th Earl of Berkeley (1827–1888), son of George Berkeley, who was a grandson of the 4th Earl
- Randal Thomas Mowbray Berkeley, 8th Earl of Berkeley (1865–1942) (dormant 1942)

== Family tree ==
Family tree of the Barons Berkeley of the Berkeley family

Robert Fitzharding "Robert the Devout" c. 1095–1170; 1st Feudal Baron of Berkeley
Maurice FitzRobert FitzHarding "Maurice the Make-Peace" c. 1120–1190/1191; 2nd Feudal Baron of Berkeley
Robert de Berkeley "Robert the Observer or Temporiser" c. 1165–1220; 3rd Feudal Baron of Berkeley	Thomas I de Berkeley "Thomas the Observer or Temporiser" c. 1170–1243; 4th Feudal Baron of Berkeley
Maurice de Berkeley "Maurice the Resolute"; 1218–1281; 5th Feudal Baron of Berkeley
Baron Berkeley (1st creation by writ), 1295
Thomas de Berkeley "Thomas the Wise"; 1245–1321; 1st Baron Berkeley, 6th Feudal Baron of Berkeley
Maurice de Berkeley "Maurice the Magnanimous"; 1271–1326; 2nd Baron Berkeley, 7th Feudal Baron of Berkeley
Bruton cadet branch
Thomas de Berkeley "Thomas the Rich" c. 1293/1296–1361; 3rd Baron Berkeley, 8th Feudal Baron of Berkeley	Maurice de Berkeley; 1298–1347
Maurice de Berkeley "Maurice the Valiant"; 1320–1368; 4th Baron Berkeley, 9th Feudal Baron of Berkeley	Thomas Berkeley; 1333–1361
Thomas de Berkeley "Thomas the Magnificent"; 1353–1417; 5th Baron Berkeley, 10th Feudal Baron of Berkeley	James de Berkeley d. 1405	Maurice Berkeley d. 1400
Barony Berkeley (1st creation by writ) extinct, 1417
Baron Berkeley (2nd creation by writ), 1421
Elizabeth Berkeley, Countess of Warwick; 1386–1422	James Berkeley "James the Just" c. 1394–1463; 1st Baron Berkeley, 11th Feudal Baron of Berkeley	Maurice Berkeley; 1401–1464
Viscount Berkeley, 1481; Earl of Nottingham (4th creation), 1483; Marquess of Berkeley, 1489	Barony Berkeley disinherited, 1492
William de Berkeley "William the Waste-All"; 1426–1492; Marquess of Berkeley, etc., 2nd Baron Berkeley, 12th Feudal Baron of Berkeley	Maurice Berkeley "Maurice the Lawyer"; 1436–1506 de jure 3rd Baron Berkeley, 13th Feudal Baron of Berkeley	William Berkeley; 1433–1501
Marquessate of Berkeley, Earldom of Nottingham (4th creation), and Viscountcy Berkeley extinct, 1492
Maurice Berkeley "Maurice the Courtier"; 1467–1523 de jure 4th Baron Berkeley, 14th Feudal Baron of Berkeley	Thomas Berkeley "Thomas the Sheepmaster"; 1472–1533 de jure 5th Baron Berkeley, 15th Feudal Baron of Berkeley	Richard Berkeley; 1470–1514
Thomas Berkeley "Thomas the Hopeful"; 1505–1534 de jure 6th Baron Berkeley, 16th Feudal Baron of Berkeley	Maurice Berkeley by 1514–1581
Henry Berkeley "Henry the Harmless"; 1534–1613 de jure 7th Baron Berkeley, 17th Feudal Baron of Berkeley	Henry Berkeley d. 1601
Baron Berkeley de facto, 1553
Anne Savage c. 1496–1564	Thomas Berkeley; 1575–1611	Maurice Berkeley d. 1617
Succeeded to predeceased son's title	Baron Berkeley of Stratton, 1658
George Berkeley; 1601–1658; 8th Baron Berkeley, 18th Feudal Baron of Berkeley	Charles Berkeley; 1599–1666; 2nd Viscount Fitzhardinge, etc.	John Berkeley; 1602–1678; 1st Baron Berkeley of Stratton
Earl of Berkeley and Viscount Dursley, 1679	Viscount Fitzhardinge and Baron Berkeley of Rathdowne, 1663; Earl of Falmouth, 1664
George Berkeley; 1627–1698; 1st Earl of Berkeley, etc., 9th Baron Berkeley, 19th Feudal Baron of Berkeley	Maurice Berkeley; 1628–1690; 3rd Viscount Fitzhardinge, etc.	Charles Berkeley; 1630–1665; 1st Earl of Falmouth, 1st Viscount Fitzhardinge, etc.	John Berkeley; 1650–1712; 4th Viscount Fitzhardinge, etc.
Feudal barony of Berkley abolished, 1660	Earldom of Falmouth extinct, 1665	Viscountcy Fitzhardinge extinct, 1712
Charles Berkeley; 1649–1710; 2nd Earl of Berkeley, etc., 10th Baron Berkeley	Charles Berkeley; 1662–1681; 2nd Baron Berkeley of Stratton	John Berkeley; 1663–1697; 3rd Baron Berkeley of Stratton	William Berkeley d. 1741; 4th Baron Berkeley of Stratton
James Berkeley after 1679–1736; 3rd Earl of Berkeley, etc., 11th Baron Berkeley	John Berkeley; 1697–1773; 5th Baron Berkeley of Stratton
Barony Berkeley of Stratton extinct, 1773
Augustus Berkeley; 1715–1755; 4th Earl of Berkeley, etc., 12th Baron Berkeley
Frederick Augustus Berkeley; 1745–1810; 5th Earl of Berkeley, etc., 13th Baron Berkeley	George Cranfield Berkeley; 1753–1818
Baron Segrave, 1831; Earl FitzHardinge, 1841	Baron FitzHardinge, 1861
William FitzHardinge Berkeley; 1786–1857; 1st Earl FitzHardinge, etc.	Maurice Frederick FitzHardinge Berkeley; 1788–1867; 1st Baron FitzHardinge	Thomas Moreton FitzHardinge Berkeley; 1796–1882 de jure 6th Earl of Berkeley, etc., 14th Baron Berkeley	Craven FitzHardinge Berkeley; 1805–1855	George Berkeley; 1785–1857
Earldom FitzHardinge and Barony Segrave extinct, 1857
Francis William FitzHardinge Berkeley; 1826–1896; 2nd Baron FitzHardinge	Charles Paget Fitzhardinge Berkeley; 1830–1916; 3rd Baron FitzHardinge	Louisa Mary Berkeley; 1840–1899; 15th Baroness Berkeley	George Lennox Rawdon Berkeley; 1827–1888; 7th Earl of Berkeley, etc.
Barony FitzHardinge extinct, 1916
Illegitimate line	Peerage confirmed, 1891
Eva Mary FitzHardinge Milman; 1875–1964; 16th Baroness Berkeley	Captain Hastings George Fitzhardinge Berkeley; 1855–1934	Randal Thomas Mowbray Berkeley; 1865–1942; 8th Earl of Berkeley, etc.
Barony Berkeley abeyant, 1964	Earldom of Berkeley dormant, 1942
Baron Berkeley abeyance terminated, 1967
Mary Lalle Foley-Berkeley; 1905–1992; 17th Baroness Berkeley	Cynthia Ella Foley; 1909–1991	Sir Lennox Randal Berkeley; 1903–1989
Baron Gueterbock, 2000	Baron Berkeley of Knighton, 2013
Anthony Fitzhardinge Gueterbock b. 1939; 18th Baron Berkeley, Baron Gueterbock	Michael Fitzhardinge Berkeley b. 1948; Baron Berkeley of Knighton

== Arms of the Earls of Berkeley ==
Coat of arms of Baron Berkeley
Crest A mitre, gules, labelled and garnished or, charged with a chevron and crosses-patée, as in the arms. Escutcheon Gules a chevron between ten crosses patee, six in chief and four in base, argent. Supporters Two lions, argent, the sinister ducally crowned gules, collared and chained gold. Motto Dieu avec nous (God with us).

== See also ==
- Baron Berkeley of Rathdowne (subsidiary to the viscountcy Fitzhardinge, both in the Peerage of Ireland, 1663–1712)
- Baron Berkeley of Stratton (the last of whom left his estate to the senior line)
- Michael Berkeley, Baron Berkeley of Knighton (descendant of the 7th Earl of Berkeley)

== Sources ==
- George Edward Cokayne. The Complete Peerage. Volume 2: Bass to Canning, ed. Gibbs, Vicary, London, 1912, pp. 118–149, Berkeley
- Sanders, I.J. English Baronies, Oxford, 1960, p. 13, Berkeley
- Smyth, John (1567–1640). The Lives of the Berkeleys, Lords of the Honour, Castle and Manor of Berkeley from 1066 to 1618, ed. Maclean, Sir John, 3 vols., Gloucester, 1883–1885 (First published c. 1628)
- Hesilrige, Arthur G. M. (1921). Debrett's Peerage and Titles of courtesy. London: London: Dean & son, limited. pp. 112, 113.
  - Vol 1, 1883
  - Vol 2, 1883
  - Vol.3, 1885
