= Fitzhardinge =

FitzHardinge is a surname. Notable people with the surname include:

- Baron FitzHardinge, created in the Peerage of the United Kingdom on 5 August 1861
- Earl FitzHardinge, created in the Peerage of the United Kingdom in 1841
- Edward Fitzhardinge Campbell (1880–1957), Irish rugby international
- Francis Berkeley, 2nd Baron FitzHardinge FSA (1826–1896), British Liberal politician
- Henry Berkeley Fitzhardinge Maxse KCMG (1832–1883), Newfoundland colonial leader and a captain during the Crimean War
- John Fitzhardinge Paul Butler VC DSO (1888–1916), British Army officer during World War I, recipient of the Victoria Cross
- Maurice Berkeley, 1st Baron FitzHardinge, GCB PC, DL (1788–1867), former Royal Navy First Sea Lord
- Viscount Fitzhardinge, extinct title in the Peerage of Ireland
