= Maurice Berkeley (1358–1400) =

Sir Maurice Berkeley (1358 – 2 October 1400) of Uley and Stoke Gifford in Gloucestershire was a Member of Parliament for the constituency of Gloucestershire in 1391.

== Origins ==
He was the son and heir of Sir Thomas Berkeley (d.1361) of Uley and Stoke Gifford, by his wife Katherine Botetourt (d.1388), one of the three daughters and co-heiresses of John Botetourt, 2nd Baron Botetourt (d.1385). He thus inherited from his mother a one third claim to the barony of Botetourt. He was a great-grandson of Maurice de Berkeley, 2nd Baron Berkeley, 7th feudal baron of Berkeley (1271–1326), Maurice the Magnanimous, of Berkeley Castle.

== Marriage and children ==
He married Joan Dynham (d.1412), a daughter of Sir John Dynham (1359–1428), of Hartland and Nutwell both in Devon, whose effigy survives in Kingskerswell Church in Devon. By his wife he had one son and heir:

- Sir Maurice Berkeley (9 Feb 1401-1464), of Stoke Gifford, born posthumously, an MP for Gloucestershire in 1425 and 1429.
