= Randal Thomas Mowbray Berkeley, 8th Earl of Berkeley =

British scientist (1865–1942)

The Earl in 1939.

Randal Thomas Mowbray Berkeley, 8th Earl of Berkeley FRS (31 January 1865 – 15 January 1942) was a British peer, physical chemist, and landowner.

== Birth and ancestry ==
Berkeley was born in Ixelles, Brussels, the third son (but only legitimate son) of George Lennox Rawdon Berkeley (1827–1888) by his wife, Cécile (died 1914), daughter of Edward Drummond, count of Melfort and divorced wife of Admiral Sir Fleetwood B. R. Pellew.

In 1882, his father inherited the titles of Earl of Berkeley and Viscount Dursley from his cousin, Thomas Moreton Fitzhardinge Berkeley, 6th Earl of Berkeley and 14th Baron Berkeley (who did not use the earldom by family arrangement) while the barony of Berkeley descended to a female line; Randal Berkeley then assumed the courtesy title of Viscount Dursley. On the death of his father in 1888 he assumed the title of Earl of Berkeley, and he established his right to the peerage in 1891.

== Life ==
Berkeley lived with his parents abroad, and was educated in France before returning to England to prepare for entrance into the Royal Navy, being crammed at Dr. Burney's Academy for the purpose. He entered HMS Britannia in 1878, and served on various ships from 1880 to 1887, including a period of service on the China Station. He also attended the Royal Naval College, Greenwich.

He married Mary Emlen née Lowell.

His interest in science and mathematics was stimulated by his time in the navy. In 1887, he resigned his commission to dedicate himself to scientific research. He then studied for a period at the Royal College of Science, during which he became interested in crystals.

== Arms ==
Coat of arms of Randal Thomas Mowbray Berkeley, 8th Earl of Berkeley
Crest A mitre, gules, labelled and garnished or, charged with a chevron and crosses-patée, as in the arms. Escutcheon Gules a chevron between ten crosses patee, six in chief and four in base, argent. Supporters Two lions, argent, the sinister ducally crowned gules, collared and chained gold. Motto Dieu avec nous (God with us).
