= Thomas Berkeley, 6th Baron Berkeley =

English peer

Thomas Berkeley, 6th Baron Berkeley (c. 1505 – 19 September 1534) was an English peer and member of King Henry VIII's court.

== Family ==
Thomas Berkeley, sometimes called Thomas the Hopeful, was born at Hovingham in Yorkshire around 1505. He was the son of Thomas Berkeley, 5th Baron Berkeley and his first wife, Eleanor Constable of Flamborough (d. 1525). At around the age of 10 he was adopted by his childless uncle, Maurice Berkeley, 4th Baron Berkeley, and taken by him to Calais, where he was educated. He returned to England following the death of his uncle in 1523 and the succession of his father to the barony made him the heir apparent rather than the heir presumptive, who could be supplanted.

Following his return to England, his father began negotiations for the marriage of Thomas to Katherine, one of the daughters of Thomas Howard, 3rd Duke of Norfolk and his second wife Elizabeth Stafford. John Smyth speculated that this marriage did not occur, because Katherine died (which she did not until after 1529), that they were too closely related or that they disliked each other. It is more likely that Katherine was below the canonical age for marriage and his father was keen that Thomas should marry quickly. Hence in 1525/26 Thomas married Katherine's older cousin Mary, the daughter of George Hastings, 1st Earl of Huntingdon and Anne Stafford. He succeeded his father as Lord Berkeley in January 1533. His wife died around six weeks later.

Shortly after, he married Anne Savage, one of Anne Boleyn's gentlewomen. The speed of the marriage led to speculation that it was Anne's reward for having been a witness to the queen's wedding. He was created a Knight of the Bath at Anne's coronation. In the spring of 1534 he used his armed retainers to force the monastic community of Croxton Abbey to pay him a substantial sum of money to be allowed to choose their own abbot. In the summer of 1534 he and Anne leased Stone Castle, Kent, a convenient stopping point for travelers between the English court and France. He died at Stone in September after a short illness, caused according to family tradition from a surfeit of cherries.

His first marriage was childless. By his second marriage he had two children:

- Elizabeth Butler (née Berkeley), Countess of Ormond
- Henry Berkeley, 7th Baron Berkeley, who was born after his father's death.

== Sources ==
- Smyth, John (1567–1640). The Lives of the Berkeleys, Lords of the Honour, Castle and Manor of Berkeley from 1066 to 1618, ed. Maclean, Sir John, 3 vols., Gloucester, 1883–1885

Peerage of England
Preceded by Thomas Berkeley	de jure Baron Berkeley; 1532–1534	Succeeded by Henry Berkeley
