= Mary Foley-Berkeley, 17th Baroness Berkeley =

British politician (1905–1992)

Mary Lalle Foley-Berkeley, 17th Baroness Berkeley (9 October 1905 – 17 October 1992) was a British politician and peeress.

== Life and wealth ==
She was born in Chertsey, Surrey, United Kingdom on 9 October 1905. Daughter of Lt-Col. Frank Wigram Foley and Eva Mary FitzHardinge Milman, 16th Baroness Berkeley.

Born as Mary Lalle Foley, she changed her name legally to Hon. Mary Lalle Foley-Berkeley in 1951.

She was an active member of the House of Lords and participated in several debates from 1970 to 1977.

She succeeded to the title of 17th Baroness Berkeley on 5 April 1967 when the abeyance of the barony was terminated in her favour. She died unmarried at the age of 87, on which her title passed to nephew Anthony Gueterbock.

Her probate was sworn the next year at £878,833 (equivalent to about £2,300,000 in 2023); her home was Pickade Cottage, Great Kimble in the Chilterns.

Peerage of England
Preceded by Eva Foley	Baroness Berkeley; 1967–1992	Succeeded by Anthony Gueterbock
