= John Berkeley, 1st Baron Berkeley of Stratton =

English peer, royalist soldier, politician and diplomat (1602–1678)

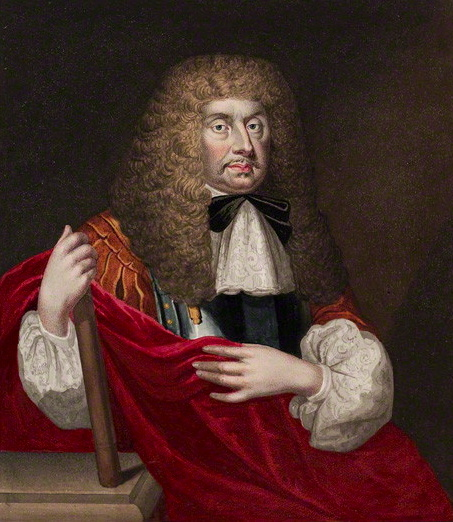
John Berkeley, 1st Baron Berkeley of Stratton, holding his baton of office

John Berkeley, 1st Baron Berkeley of Stratton (1602 – 26 August 1678) of Berkeley House in Westminster and of Twickenham Park in Middlesex, was an English royalist soldier, politician and diplomat, of the Bruton branch of the Berkeley family. From 1648 he was closely associated with James, Duke of York (the future King James II), and rose to prominence, fortune, and fame. He and Sir George Carteret were the founders of the Province of New Jersey, a British colony in North America that would eventually become the U.S. state of New Jersey. The territorial designation of his title refers to his role at the Battle of Stratton, Cornwall, in 1643 at which the Royalists destroyed Parliament's field army in Devon and Cornwall.

== Origins ==
Berkeley was the second son of Sir Maurice Berkeley of Bruton Abbey in the parish of Bruton, Somerset, a member of the landed gentry and a Member of Parliament, by his wife Elizabeth Killigrew, a daughter of Sir William Killigrew of Hanworth. His eldest brother was Charles Berkeley, 2nd Viscount Fitzhardinge; his younger brother, Sir William Berkeley, served as royal governor of the Colony of Virginia from 1642 to 1652 and again from 1660 to 1677.

== Early life ==
John Berkeley was accredited ambassador from Charles I of England to Christina of Sweden, in January 1637, to propose a joint effort by the two sovereigns for the reinstatement of the elector palatine in his dominions; probably the employment of Berkeley in this by his cousin, Sir Thomas Roe, who had conducted negotiations between Gustavus Adolphus and the king of Poland. Berkeley returned from Sweden in July 1637. He had a commission in the army against the Scots in 1638 and was knighted at Berwick in that year. In 1640 he was returned to parliament for both Heytesbury and Reading, electing to retain his seat for the former place. Next year he was accused in parliament of complicity in the Army Plots, expelled from the house, and committed to the Tower of London; he was subsequently bailed by Edward Sackville, 4th Earl of Dorset and Henry Grey, 1st Earl of Stamford in the sum of £10,000, but the outbreak of hostilities prevented any further steps being taken.

== First English Civil War ==
Berkeley took a conspicuous part in the First English Civil War, supporting the royal cause. He became governor of Exeter, and general of the royalist forces in Devon.

In 1642 he joined the Marquess of Hertford at Sherborne, and was sent into Cornwall with the rank of commissary-general to act under Sir Ralph Hopton as lieutenant-general. The royalist forces defeated, in May 1643, the Earl of Stamford at the Battle of Stratton, with great loss of baggage and artillery, and pursued him as far as Wells.

In this affair, Sir John distinguished himself and was now made commander-in-chief of all the royalist forces in Devon. He sat down before Exeter, into which the Earl of Stamford had withdrawn, and which was further defended by the fleet under Robert Rich, 2nd Earl of Warwick. Berkeley succeeded in maintaining a blockade, beating off the Earl of Warwick with a loss of three ships, and on 4 September 1643, the Earl of Stamford was compelled to surrender.

In 1644, Berkeley was present at the baptism of Henrietta Maria, the king's daughter, who was born at Exeter. The same year Hopton and Berkeley joined their forces to oppose Sir William Waller's westward advance, but were badly beaten at the Battle of Cheriton near Alresford in Hampshire on 29 March.

In April 1645, he superseded Sir Richard Grenville, being made colonel-general of the counties of Devon and Cornwall, took Wellington House, near Taunton, by assault, and then proceeded to invest Taunton. The advance of Thomas Fairfax westward in the autumn of the year changed the aspect of affairs. In January 1646 Fairfax was able to concentrate on Exeter, which Berkeley was forced (13 April) to surrender, on honourable terms.

== Involvement in the Hampton Court escape ==
After the surrender of the royalist forces, Berkeley joined his kinsman, Lord Jermyn, in attendance upon Queen Henrietta Maria. Having persuaded the queen that he possessed influence with some of the principal officers in the army, he obtained from her a letter of recommendation to the king. Having gained access to the king, he set about using his influence with Oliver Cromwell, Henry Ireton, and others, with a view to mediating between them and the captive king; he was supported by John Ashburnham. The result was that a set of propositions emanating from the chiefs of the army were submitted to the king as a basis of reconciliation in July 1647. These the king scornfully rejected.

Berkeley received the king's commands to attend him in his flight from Hampton Court on the night of 10 November 1647. The party pushed on towards Hampshire, and ultimately reached Lymington. Berkeley crossed the Solent and opened the matter to Robert Hammond, parliamentary governor of the Isle of Wight which was the king's goal; Hammond was non-committal. The envoys then conducted Hammond to the king at Lymington, an act later much criticized. Charles felt he had no choice but saw nothing for it but to accompany Hammond to Carisbrooke Castle. After this exploit, Berkeley returned to London, still bent on using his influence with the army. Being badly received by the officers, and arraigned by the parliament as a delinquent, he returned to Paris.

== In exile ==
In Paris, during the absence of John Byron, 1st Baron Byron in England, he obtained, through the influence, as it would seem, of Henry Jermyn, 1st Earl of St Albans, the post of temporary governor to the Duke of York (1648), and on the death of Byron (1652) took over the position. He acquired control of the Duke's finances and endeavoured to bring about a match between the Duke and Marie de Longueville, but the French court refused approval. Berkeley himself paid court to Anne Villiers, Countess of Morton, widowed in 1651; she turned him down, perhaps on advice from Sir Edward Hyde. Berkeley and Hyde became enemies.

Between 1652 and 1655 Berkeley served under Turenne in the campaigns against Condé, and the Spaniards in Flanders, accompanying the Duke of York as a volunteer. When the Duke placed his sword at the disposal of Spain and crossed over into the Netherlands early in 1656, he was still accompanied by Berkeley. In the spring of the next year, he made a tour with the Duke through some of the principal cities of the Netherlands, took part in the campaigns of that and the following year, and at the request of the duke was raised to the peerage as Baron Berkeley "of Stratton in Cornwall", by a patent dated at Brussels 19 May 1658.

== After the Restoration ==
On the Restoration Berkeley was put on the staff of the Admiralty. In 1661 he was appointed Lord President of Connaught for life, a deputy being appointed to do the work of the office in Ireland. In 1663 (17 June) Berkeley was sworn a member of the Privy Council, and in the following year was made one of the Masters of Ordinance. In January 1665 Berkeley was placed on the Committee of Tangier. In 1670 he went to Ireland as Lord Lieutenant, holding the office for two years, with a few months' leaves of absence. He was considered pro-Catholic, and to favour Archbishop Peter Talbot to the extent of allowing him to use a silver plate to add to the magnificence of a religious celebration, and expressing a desire to see a high mass at Christ Church. In December 1675 Berkeley was appointed, with Sir William Temple and Sir Leoline Jenkyns, ambassador extraordinary on the part of England at the Congress of Nijmegen then about to assemble, but bad health both delayed his departure for Nijmegen, which he finally reached in November 1676, and caused him to return the following May, before the conference finished.

== New Jersey interests ==
Berkeley's personal relationships with Charles II and the Duke of York led to his receiving an interest in New Jersey, in addition to that in Carolina previously received. Berkeley was co-proprietor of New Jersey from 1664 to 1674. In 1665, Berkeley and Sir George Carteret drafted the Concession and Agreement, a proclamation for the structure of the government for the Province of New Jersey. The document also provided freedom of religion in the colony. Berkeley sold his share to a group of Quakers because of the political difficulties between New York Governor Richard Nicolls, Carteret, and himself. This effectively split New Jersey into two colonies: East Jersey, belonging to Carteret, and West Jersey. The division remained until 1702 when West Jersey went bankrupt; the Crown then took back and subsequently re-unified the colony.

== Residences ==
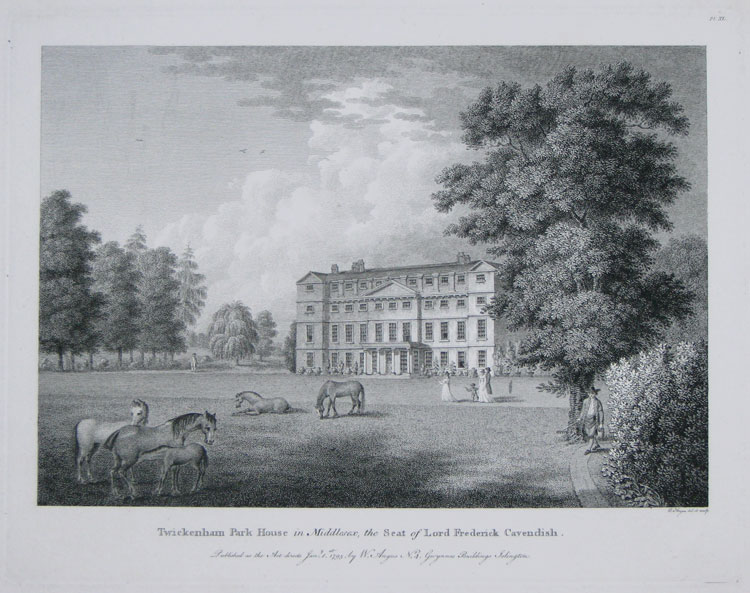
Twickenham Park House

In 1665 he began building Berkeley House, his palatial London townhouse in the Italian style, on the north side of Piccadilly, near St James's Palace in Westminster. It cost nearly £30,000 and was completed about 1673, upon Berkeley's return from Ireland. The expansive grounds, today in Mayfair in Central London, are commemorated by the street names Bruton Street, Bruton Place, Bruton Lane, Stratton Street, Berkeley Street and Berkeley Square. It was renamed Devonshire House after its purchase in 1697 by William Cavendish, 1st Duke of Devonshire, and burned down in 1733 when replaced by a second Devonshire House. In 1668 Berkeley bought Twickenham Park in Middlesex, near London.

== Death and legacy ==
On 26 August 1678 John Berkeley died, aged seventy-two years. He was buried on 5 September in St Mary's Church, Twickenham. in which a memorial window commemorates him and his brother Sir William Berkeley.

Although John Berkeley held many distinguished offices, some authorities assert that, at one time, he was under a cloud, in consequence of his being detected in the selling of offices, and other corrupt practices. Samuel Pepys speaks of him as being esteemed "a fortunate, though a passionate, and but weak man as to policy", and "the hottest, fiery man in discourse, without any cause", he ever saw. Berkeley was notorious for spinning incredible tales of his exploits; Clarendon wrote that through constant re-telling he may have come to believe them himself.

== Family ==
Berkeley married Christian or Christiana Riccard, daughter of Sir Andrew Riccard, a wealthy London merchant, in the East India Company; she had already been married first to Sir John Geare, and subsequently (14 February 1659) to Henry Rich, Lord Kensington, son of Robert Rich, 5th Earl of Warwick. He left three sons, each of whom succeeded in his turn to the title, and one daughter, Anne, who married Sir Dudley Cullum, Bart., of Hanstead, Suffolk. The title became extinct in 1773.

== Footnotes ==
Political offices
Preceded by The Lord Robartes	Lord Lieutenant of Ireland; 1670–1672	Succeeded by The Earl of Essex
Peerage of England
New creation	Baron Berkeley of Stratton; 1658–1678	Succeeded by Charles Berkeley
