= Thomas de Berkeley, 1st Baron Berkeley =

English baron and diplomat (c. 1245–1321)

Arms of Berkeley: Gules, a chevron between ten crosses pattée six in chief and four in base argent

Thomas de Berkeley, 1st Baron Berkeley (c. 1245– 23 July 1321), The Wise, feudal baron of Berkeley, of Berkeley Castle in Gloucestershire, England, was a peer, soldier and diplomat. His epithet, and that of each previous and subsequent head of his family, was coined by John Smyth of Nibley (d.1641), steward of the Berkeley estates, the biographer of the family and author of "Lives of the Berkeleys".

== Origins ==
Thomas de Berkeley was born around 1245 at Berkeley Castle in Gloucestershire, the son of Sir Maurice de Berkeley, feudal baron of Berkeley, by his wife Isabel FitzRoy, a paternal granddaughter of King John (1199-1216) through his bastard son Richard FitzRoy.

== Career ==
He fought in the Battle of Evesham in 1265. He inherited the feudal baron of Berkeley in 1281 following the death of his father and on 28 June 1283 was created 1st Baron Berkeley by writ of summons to Parliament by King Edward I (1272-1307). In June 1292 he was a commissioner to examine the claims to the crown of Scotland. He was on an embassy to France in January 1296 and held the office of Vice-Constable of England in 1297. He fought in the Battle of Falkirk on 22 July 1298 and was present at the Siege of Caerlaverock, Scotland, in July 1300. He was on an embassy to Pope Clement V in July 1307. He fought in the Battle of Bannockburn on 24 June 1314, where he was taken prisoner, and obliged to pay a large sum for his ransom.

== Marriage and descendants ==
In 1267 Thomas de Berkeley married Joan de Ferrers (d. 1309), a daughter of William de Ferrers, 5th Earl of Derby, by his wife Margaret de Quincy, a daughter of Roger de Quincy, 2nd Earl of Winchester. By his wife he had the following children:

- Maurice de Berkeley, 2nd Baron Berkeley (April 1271 - 31 May 1326), eldest son and heir.
- Thomas Berkeley of Coston, Leicestershire, ancestor of the Berkeleys of Wymondham, Leicestershire.
- John Berkeley (d. circa 1317).
- James Berkeley (d. 1327), Bishop of Exeter.
- Alice Berkeley, married Sir Ralph Stourton.
- Isabel Berkeley.
- Margaret Berkeley, married Thomas FitzGerald, 2nd Baron Desmond

== Death and succession ==
He died at Berkeley Castle on 23 July 1321 and was succeeded in his titles by his eldest son Maurice de Berkeley, 2nd Baron Berkeley.

Peerage of England
New creation	Baron Berkeley; 1295–1321	Succeeded by Maurice de Berkeley
