= Earl of Falmouth =

Extinct earldom in the Peerage of the United Kingdom

Earl of Falmouth 2nd Creation
- Arms: Ermine, a Rose Gules, barbed and seeded proper. Crest: A Falcon close proper. Supporters: On either side a Sea-Lion erect on their tails Argent, gouttée-de-larmes.
- Creation date: 14 July 1821
- Creation: Second
- Created by: King George IV
- Peerage: Peerage of the United Kingdom
- First holder: Edward Boscawen, 1st Earl of Falmouth
- Last holder: George Boscawen, 2nd Earl of Falmouth
- Subsidiary titles: Viscount Falmouth; Baron Boscawen-Rose
- Status: Extinct
- Extinction date: 29 August 1852
- Motto: PATIENCE PASSE SCIENCE (Patience surpasses knowledge)

Arms of the Boscawen family, Earls and Viscounts Falmouth: Ermine, a rose gules barbed and seeded proper; crest, per Debrett's Peerage, 1968: A falcon close proper; supporters: Two sea lions erect on their tails argent gutte de larmes

The title of Earl of Falmouth has been created twice, once in the Peerage of England and the second time in the Peerage of the United Kingdom. The first creation, on 17 March 1664, was for Charles Berkeley, 1st Viscount Fitzhardinge, who was at the same time created Baron Botetourt of Langport. It became extinct upon his death the following year. The second creation, on 14 July 1821, was for Edward Boscawen, 4th Viscount Falmouth. It became extinct in 1852.

== Earl of Falmouth, first creation (1664) ==
- Charles Berkeley, 1st Earl of Falmouth (bef. 1636–1665)

== Earl of Falmouth, second creation (1821) ==
- Edward Boscawen, 1st Earl of Falmouth (1787–1841)
- George Henry Boscawen, 2nd Earl of Falmouth (1811–1852)

== See also ==
- Viscount Falmouth
- Viscount Fitzhardinge
