= Maurice de Berkeley, 2nd Baron Berkeley =

English noble and rebel

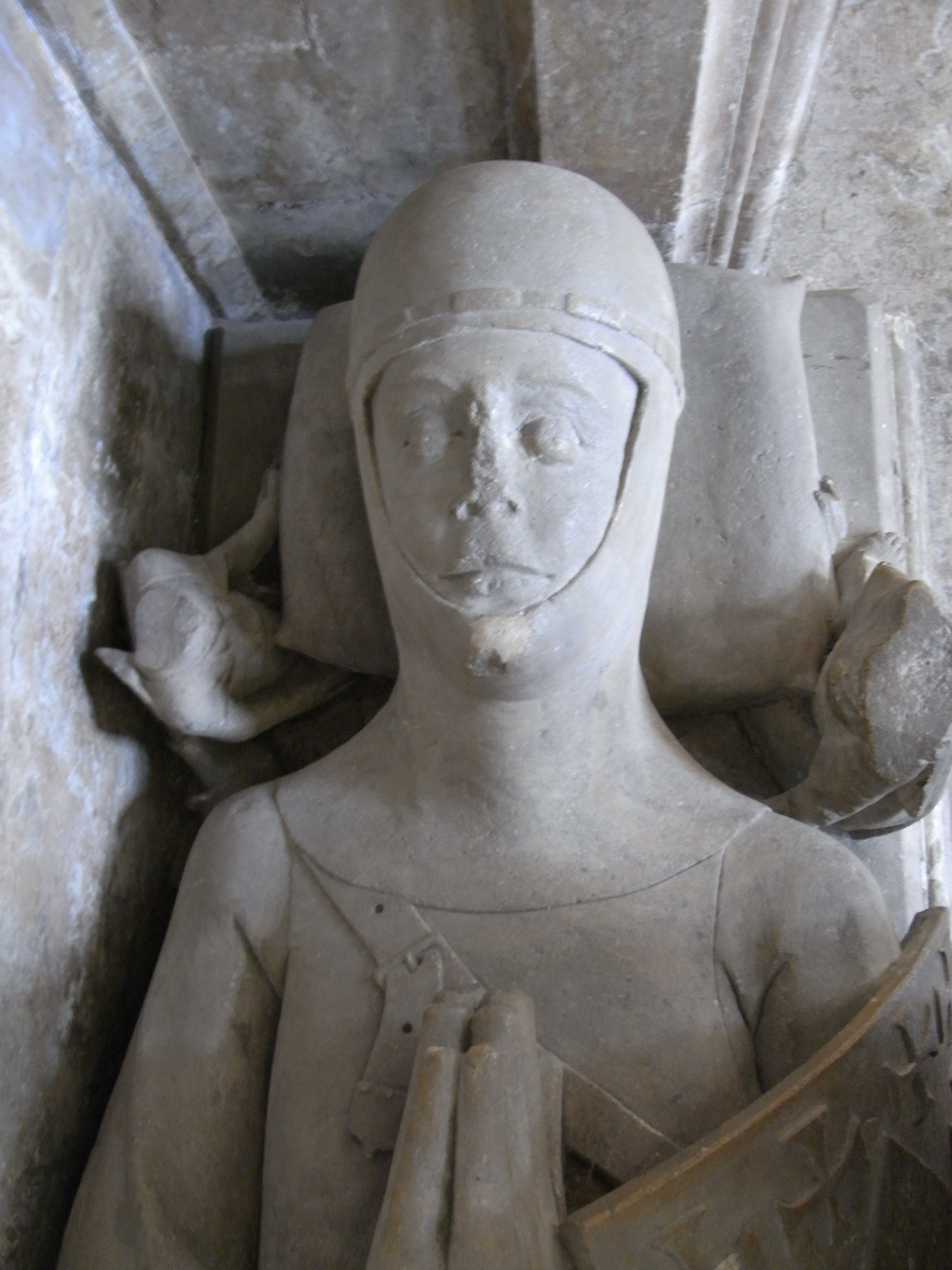
Effigy of Maurice de Berkeley, 2nd Baron Berkeley (died 1326), "The Magnanimous", St Augustine's Abbey, Bristol (Bristol Cathedral)

Arms of Berkeley: Gules, a chevron between ten crosses pattée six in chief and four in base argent

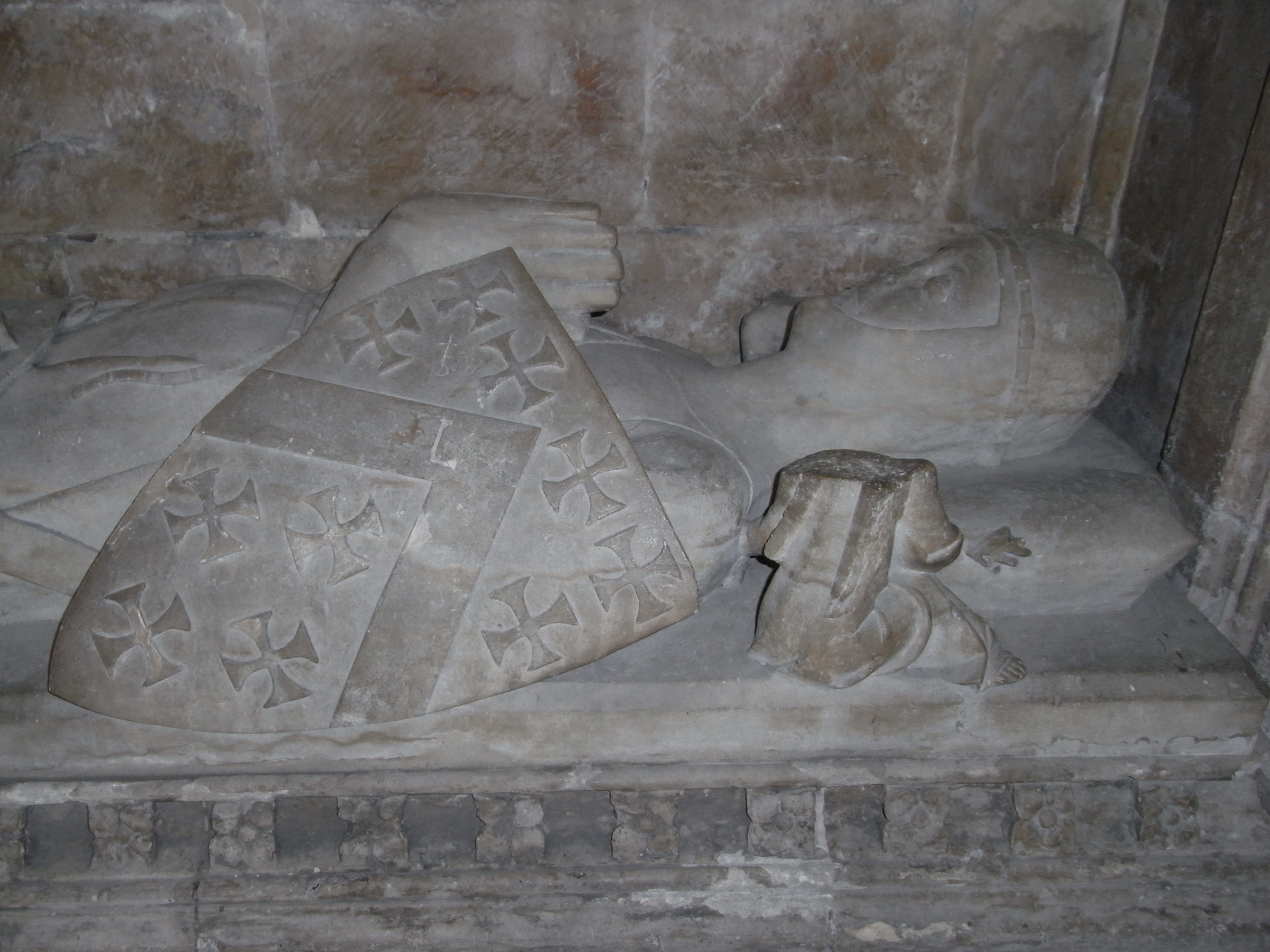
Effigy of Maurice de Berkeley, 2nd Baron Berkeley (died 1326), "The Magnanimous", St Augustine's Abbey, Bristol (Bristol Cathedral). The Berkeley arms are visible on his shield

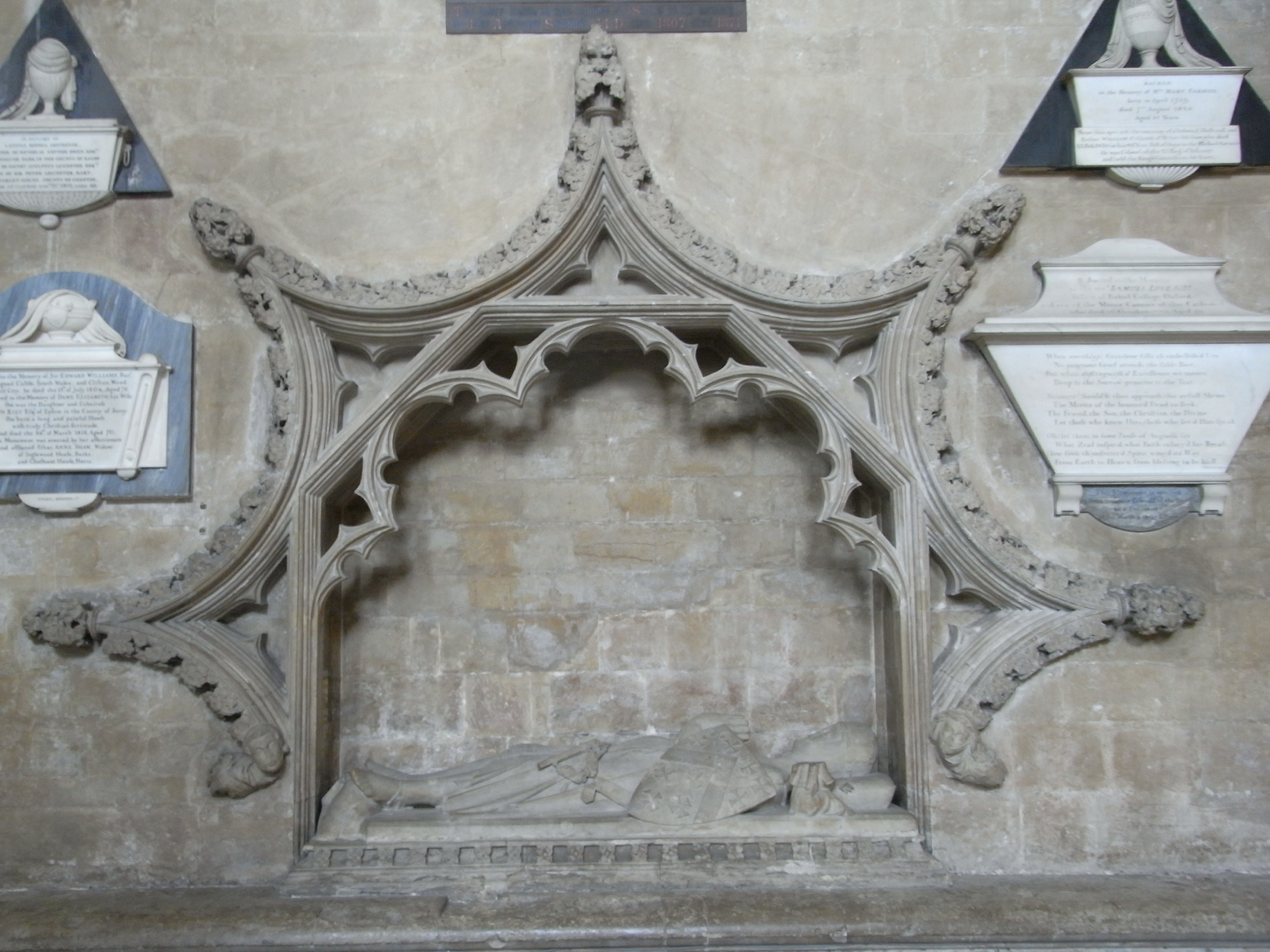
Full-view of monument

Maurice de Berkeley, 2nd Baron Berkeley (1281 – 31 May 1326), The Magnanimous, feudal baron of Berkeley, of Berkeley Castle in Gloucestershire, England, was a peer. He rebelled against King Edward II and the Despencers. His epithet, and that of each previous and subsequent head of his family, was coined by John Smyth of Nibley (died 1641), steward of the Berkeley estates, the biographer of the family and author of Lives of the Berkeleys.

== Origins ==
He was the eldest son and heir of Thomas de Berkeley, 1st Baron Berkeley, by his wife Joan de Ferrers (1255–1309), born around the time of the death of his grandfather.

== Career ==
He was involved in the Scottish Wars from about 1295 to 1318. He was appointed governor of Gloucester by Edward II in 1312, shortly after the execution of Piers Gaveston. He was governor of Berwick-on-Tweed from 1314 until it fell to the Scots in 1318. He was also appointed Justiciar of South Wales in 1316 and Steward of the Duchy of Aquitaine in 1319

He succeeded his father in 1321, but within a few months joined Thomas, 2nd Earl of Lancaster, in his rebellion against the king. He surrendered in February 1322 and the king confiscated his estate. He spent the remainder of his life as a prisoner in Wallingford Castle (now in Oxfordshire, previously in Berkshire).

== Marriages and children ==
He married:

- Eve de la Zouche (d. 1314), daughter of Eudo Zouche and his wife, Millicent Cantilupe, daughter and eventual co-heiress of William III Cantilupe in 1289, when they were both children.
  - Thomas de Berkeley, 3rd Baron Berkeley
  - Sir Maurice Berkeley (c. 1298–1347), of Uley and Stoke Gifford, who was killed at the Siege of Calais He married Margaret de Vere, who was probably the sister of John de Vere, 7th Earl of Oxford.
  - Isabel Berkeley (d. 1362), who married 1. Robert Clifford, 3rd Baron, and 2. Thomas Musgrave
  - Millicent Berkeley, who married John Maltravers, 1st Baron Maltravers.
- Isabel Clare (d. c. 1338), daughter of Gilbert Clare, 6th Earl of Hertford, about 1317.

== Death and succession ==
Berkeley died a prisoner in Wallingford Castle on 31 May 1326 and was initially buried there. The following year his son and heir Thomas, having been released from imprisonment himself, removed his father's body to St Augustine's Abbey, Bristol.

Peerage of England
Preceded by Thomas de Berkeley	Baron Berkeley; 1321–1326	Succeeded by Thomas de Berkeley
