= Anne Savage, Baroness Berkeley =

Anne Berkeley (née Savage), Baroness Berkeley (c. 1496 – 1564) was a lady-in-waiting and companion of Anne Boleyn, the second wife of Henry VIII of England. She was reputed to be one of the witnesses at the secret wedding ceremony of the King and Anne Boleyn which occurred on 25 January 1533.

== Family ==
Anne was born in England sometime around 1496, although the exact date is not known. She was the only daughter of John Savage, Sheriff of Worcestershire, and his wife Anne Bostock. She had seven brothers, including Sir John Savage of Clifton, who married Elizabeth Savage, daughter of Charles Somerset, 1st Earl of Worcester and a second cousin of Henry VIII. In 1516 Sir John and his henchmen killed a local magistrate and Thomas Wolsey took the opportunity to send both Anne's brother and her father to the Tower.

== Marriage and children ==
Anne married in April 1533, as his second wife, Thomas Berkeley, 6th Baron Berkeley (died 19 September 1534), son of Thomas Berkeley, 5th Baron Berkeley and Eleanor Constable. Thomas Cromwell was one of the trustees of her marriage settlement.

Thomas and Anne together had two children:

- Elizabeth Butler (née Berkeley), Countess of Ormond
- Henry Berkeley, 7th Baron Berkeley, who was born after his father's death.

== As lady-in-waiting ==
Anne seems to have been a friend and close attendant of Anne Boleyn from before Anne's marriage to Henry VIII. Only four, or possibly five, witnesses attended the King's second wedding, and these are widely thought to have included Anne. This was on 25 January 1533, and was conducted in secrecy as Anne Boleyn was pregnant and Henry had not yet annulled his marriage to Catherine of Aragon. Anne was said to have borne the train of Anne Boleyn at the wedding. However, recent research has suggested that her marriage was not a reward for her involvement in the wedding.

Anne had been at court for several years and was a dependent of her brother John's widow, Elizabeth and Elizabeth's second husband, William Brereton. Brereton was then a groom of the Privy Chamber and one of the other guests at the secret royal wedding, along with Thomas Heneage and Henry Norris. Both Norris and Brereton would later be executed for alleged adultery with Anne Boleyn.

With the fall of their allies, the Savages could have seen a decline in their fortunes, but it seems that they, and the newly widowed Elizabeth Savage, kept the friendship of Thomas Cromwell and therefore many of Brereton's estates were returned to his wife. Anne was described as being of middling stature, with a comely, brown complexion, and much tender-hearted with her children.

Thomas Berkeley, Anne's husband, was one of several Boleyn allies who was created a Knight of the Bath at Anne Boleyn's coronation. Anne's husband Thomas died on 19 September 1534, when Anne was almost seven months pregnant with their son and heir, Henry.

In a letter to Cromwell dated 1 May 1535, Anne, then Dowager Baroness Berkeley: Complains of the delay of the master of the King's wards in sending out the writs concerning the office to be found after the decease of her husband. It is great loss to her, for she can get nothing from her jointure. Asks him to move the King in this behalf. Acknowledges that the fee of Silebe is unpaid, but very need causes her to be slack.

Despite her association with the Boleyn circle, Anne remained a staunch catholic. She had a "masculine spirit", which was demonstrated in her legal disputes and clashes with local Protestants.

Anne died at Caludon Castle outside Coventry in October 1564.
