= Maurice de Berkeley =

Anglo-Norman soldier and rebel

Sir Maurice de Berkeley "the Resolute" (c. 1218 – 4 April 1281), 5th (feudal) Baron de Berkeley, was an Anglo-Norman soldier and rebel, residing at Berkeley Castle in the English county of Gloucestershire.

== Life ==
Maurice was born in about 1218 to Thomas de Berkeley and wife Joan de Somery. He married Isabel FitzRoy, daughter of Richard FitzRoy, Baron of Chilham (an illegitimate son of King John of England) and wife Rose de Douvres, sometime before 12 July 1247.

Berkeley fought in the French Wars and was invested as a knight before 1242. He inherited the title of Baron de Berkeley in 1243 and, on 14 December 1243, he had livery of his father's lands. He fought in the war in North Wales and in 1264 he joined the Barons against King Henry III. Berkeley died on 4 April 1281 and was buried in St Augustine's Abbey in Bristol.

His son was Thomas de Berkeley.
