= Elizabeth Talbot, Duchess of Norfolk =

English noblewoman

Elizabeth de Mowbray
- Duchess of Norfolk; Countess of Surrey
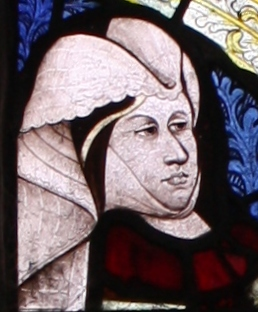
- Born: Elizabeth Talbot c. December 1442 / January 1443
- Died: between 6 November 1506 and 28 June 1507
- Noble family: Talbot
- Spouse: John de Mowbray, 4th Duke of Norfolk
- Issue: Anne de Mowbray, 8th Countess of Norfolk
- Father: John Talbot, 1st Earl of Shrewsbury
- Mother: Lady Margaret Beauchamp

Elizabeth de Mowbray, Duchess of Norfolk (née Talbot; c. December 1442/January 1443 – between 6 November 1506 and 28 June 1507) was a daughter of John Talbot, 1st Earl of Shrewsbury and his wife Lady Margaret Beauchamp. Her exact date of death is uncertain, and based only on the references to "her will dated the 6th of November, 1506, which was proved the 28th of June, 1507"

== Family ==
Lady Elizabeth Talbot was a daughter of John Talbot, 1st Earl of Shrewsbury and his wife Lady Margaret Beauchamp. Her older sister was Lady Eleanor Talbot, believed to have been King Edward IV's wife or mistress. Elizabeth's maternal grandparents were Richard de Beauchamp, 13th Earl of Warwick and Elizabeth de Berkeley. One of her brothers was John Talbot, 1st Viscount Lisle, a nobleman and soldier.

== Marriage ==
She was married to John de Mowbray. He succeeded his father as Duke of Norfolk in 1461, making her the Duchess of Norfolk by marriage. They had only one surviving daughter, who inherited the Warwick estates.

- Anne de Mowbray, 8th Countess of Norfolk (10 December 1472 – 1481), married Richard of Shrewsbury, 1st Duke of York, a son of Edward IV of England and one of the Princes in the Tower. Anne died at the age of 8.

== Ancestry ==
Ancestors of Elizabeth Talbot, Duchess of Norfolk

16. Richard Talbot, 2nd Baron Talbot
8. Gilbert Talbot, 3rd Lord Talbot
17. Elizabeth de Comyn
4. Richard, 4th Baron Talbot
18. James Butler, 1st Earl of Ormonde
9. Petronilla Butler
19. Eleanor de Bohun
2. John Talbot, 1st Earl of Shrewsbury
20. John Strange, 2nd Lord Strange
10. Richard, Baron Lestrange
5. Ankaret Strange of Blackmere
22. Edmund Fitzalan, 9th Earl of Arundel
11. Mary FitzAlan
23. Alice de Warenne
1. Elizabeth de Mowbray, Duchess of Norfolk
24. Thomas de Beauchamp, 11th Earl of Warwick
12. Thomas de Beauchamp, 12th Earl of Warwick
25. Katherine Mortimer
6. Richard de Beauchamp, 13th Earl of Warwick
26. William Ferrers, 3rd Baron Ferrers of Groby
13. Margaret Ferrers
3. Lady Margaret Beauchamp
28. Maurice de Berkeley, 4th Baron Berkeley
14. Thomas de Berkeley, 5th Baron Berkeley
29. Elizabeth le Despenser, Baroness Berkeley
7. Elizabeth de Berkeley
30. Warin de Lisle, 2nd Lord Lisle
15. Margaret de Lisle, Baroness Berkeley
31. Margaret Pipard
