= Margaret Beauchamp, Countess of Shrewsbury =

English noblewoman

Margaret Beauchamp
- Countess of Shrewsbury
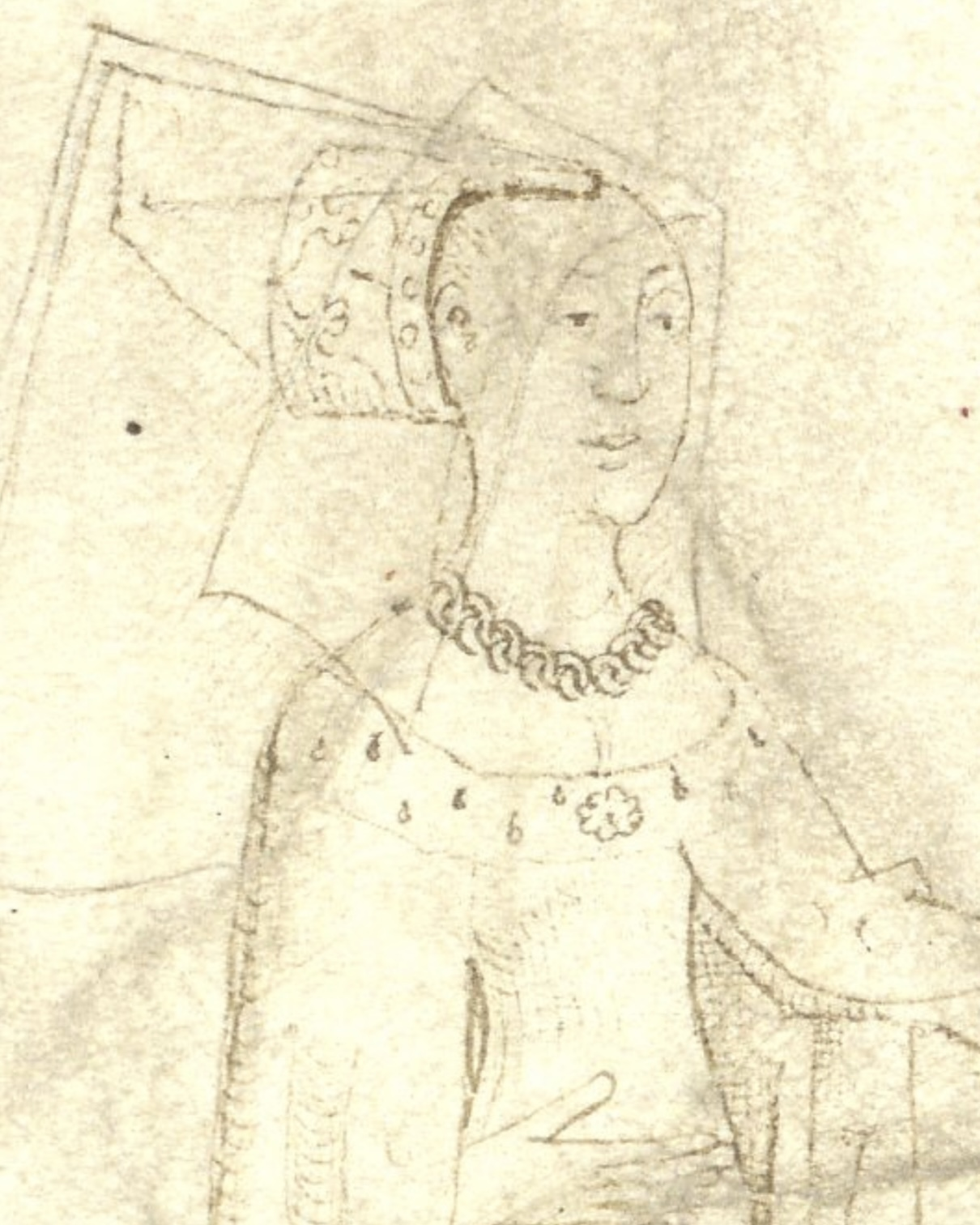
- Drawing of Margaret from the Rous Roll, c. 1483
- Born: 1404
- Died: 14 June 1467 (aged 62–63)
- Spouse: John Talbot, 1st Earl of Shrewsbury
- Issue among others: John Talbot, 1st Viscount Lisle; Eleanor Talbot; Elizabeth Talbot, Duchess of Norfolk
- Father: Richard Beauchamp, 13th Earl of Warwick
- Mother: Elizabeth Berkeley

Margaret Beauchamp (1404 – 14 June 1467) was the eldest daughter of Richard Beauchamp, 13th Earl of Warwick and his first wife, Elizabeth de Berkeley. As the eldest child of a family without male issue, Margaret was expected to inherit from her father until her stepmother, Isabel le Despenser, gave him a son.

== Ancestry ==
She was the granddaughter and heir-general of Thomas de Berkeley, 5th Baron Berkeley; however, the Barony and castle of Berkeley had passed to his nephew James Berkeley, 1st Baron Berkeley on his death in 1417. These lands were also claimed by her mother, to whom she and her two sisters were coheirs.

Her paternal grandfather was Thomas de Beauchamp, 12th Earl of Warwick, who fought for John of Gaunt in Spain and imprisoned in the Tower of London by Richard II and pardoned by Henry IV. However he died 3 years before Margaret was born.

== Marriage ==
On 6 September 1425 she married John Talbot, 1st Earl of Shrewsbury, by whom she had five children:

- John Talbot, 1st Viscount Lisle (1426 – 17 July 1453)
- Sir Louis Talbot (c. 1429)
- Sir Humphrey Talbot (before 1434 – c. 1492)
- Lady Eleanor Talbot (c. February/March 1436 – 30 June 1468), married to Sir Thomas Butler and alleged wife to King Edward IV.
- Lady Elizabeth Talbot (1443–1507), married to John de Mowbray, 4th Duke of Norfolk.

Lord and Lady Talbot were distantly related to each other, having a shared ancestor in King Edward I and both being descendants of the houses of Clare and Despenser. She received the title of Countess of Clermont through the bravery of her husband during the wars with France.

== The Berkeley Inheritance Dispute ==
Although her parents aggressively opposed Lord Berkeley's claim to the disputed estates for some years, including laying siege to Berkeley castle in 1422, a settlement was reached in 1425 following the death of the countess and the birth of a son to the earl's second wife. The dispute was reignited in 1439, when Margaret's father died and Lord Berkeley seized possession of properties that had been conceded to the earl in 1425.

Shrewsbury and Margaret's two brothers-in-law, the Duke of Somerset and the Baron Latimer, vigorously opposed the breaking of the 1425 settlement. Although the brother-in-law were prepared to agree a settlement, the dispute was maintained by the Talbots and once again became violent with Margaret taking an active role. In 1451 Margaret's son John captured Berkeley castle and took Lord Berkeley prisoner. Margaret took the initiative in the ensuing legal settlement, by which Lord Berkeley under duress conceded property and was required to enter into substantial recognizances.

The following year when Lord Berkeley's wife Isobel appeared on his behalf at court in Gloucester, Margaret had her seized and imprisoned in Gloucester castle. where she died shortly after.

Following her husband's death in 1453, Margaret was drawn into a dispute with her stepson John Talbot, 2nd Earl of Shrewsbury over his father's attempt to divide his inheritance between the issues of both his marriages. In 1457 her stepson and Lord Berkeley came to an agreement, which was sealed by the latter's marriage to Lady Joan Talbot, Margaret's stepdaughter. In 1463 Margaret and Lord Berkeley agreed that they would mutually drop all legal actions against each other.

Margaret was buried in St Faith under St Paul's at London.

== Ancestry ==
Ancestors of Margaret Beauchamp, Countess of Shrewsbury

16. Guy de Beauchamp, 10th Earl of Warwick
8. Thomas de Beauchamp, 11th Earl of Warwick
17. Alice de Toeni
4. Thomas de Beauchamp, 12th Earl of Warwick
18. Roger Mortimer, 1st Earl of March
9. Katherine Mortimer
19. Joan de Geneville, 2nd Baroness Geneville
2. Richard de Beauchamp, 13th Earl of Warwick
20. Henry Ferrers, 2nd Baron Ferrers of Groby
10. William Ferrers, 3rd Baron Ferrers of Groby
21. Isabel Verdon
5. Margaret Ferrers
22. Robert d'Ufford, 1st Earl of Suffolk
11. Margaret de Ufford
23. Margaret de Norwich
1. Margaret Beauchamp, Countess of Shrewsbury
24. Thomas de Berkeley, 3rd Baron Berkeley
12. Maurice de Berkeley, 4th Baron Berkeley
25. Margaret Mortimer
6. Thomas de Berkeley, 5th Baron Berkeley
26. Hugh le Despenser the Younger
13. Elizabeth le Despenser, Baroness Berkeley
27. Eleanor de Clare
3. Elizabeth de Berkeley
28. Gerard de Lisle, 1st Baron Lisle
14. Warin de Lisle, 2nd Lord Lisle
29. Eleanor FitzAlan
7. Margaret de Lisle, Baroness Berkeley
30. Sir William Pipard
15. Margaret Pipard
31. Margery
