= List of founders of English schools and colleges =

This is a list of the founders of English schools, colleges, and universities.

== Oxford Colleges ==
Colleges of the University of Oxford were founded by:

Founder	College	Year of foundation
William of Durham	University College	1249
John I de Balliol	Balliol College	1263
Walter de Merton	Merton College	1264
Walter de Stapledon, Bishop of Exeter	Exeter College	1314
Adam de Brome	Oriel College	1324
Robert de Eglesfield, chaplain of Queen Philippa	Queen's College	1341
William of Wykeham	New College	1379
Richard Fleming, Bishop of Lincoln	Lincoln College	1427
Henry Chichele	All Souls College	1438
William Waynflete, Bishop of Winchester	Magdalen College	1458
Richard Sutton and William Smyth	Brasenose College	1509
Richard Fox, Bishop of Winchester	Corpus Christi College	1517
King Henry VIII	Christ Church	1546
Sir Thomas Pope	Trinity College	1555
Sir Thomas White	St John's College	1555
Hugh Price	Jesus College	1571
Nicholas and Dorothy Wadham	Wadham College	1610
King James I William Herbert, 3rd Earl of Pembroke; Thomas Tesdale; Richard Wightwick	Pembroke College	1624
Sir Thomas Cookes	Worcester College	1714
Richard Newton	Hertford College	1740
Elizabeth Wordsworth	St Hugh's College	1886
Dorothea Beale	St Hilda's College	1893
Francis Chavasse	St Peter's College	1929

== Cambridge Colleges ==
Colleges of the University of Cambridge were founded by:

Founder	College	Year of foundation
Hugh de Balsham	Peterhouse	1284
Margaret of Anjou	Queens' College	1448
Elizabeth Woodville	Queens' College	1465 (refounded)
John Alcock	Jesus College	1496
Lady Margaret Beaufort	Christ's College	1505
Lady Margaret Beaufort & St John Fisher	St John's College	1511
Thomas Audley	Magdalene College	1542 (refounded)
King Henry VIII	Trinity College	1546
John Caius	Gonville and Caius College	1557 (refounded)
Frances Sidney, Countess of Sussex	Sidney Sussex College	1596
Emily Davies; Barbara Bodichon; Lady Stanley of Alderley	Girton College	1869
15th Duke of Norfolk	St Edmund's House, later College	1896

== English schools ==
English schools were founded by:

Founder	College	Year of foundation
St Augustine	The King's School, Canterbury	597 AD
St Justus	The King's School, Rochester	604 AD
St Paulinus	St Peter's School, York	627 AD
Herbert de Losinga	Norwich School	1096
Walkelin de Derby	Derby School	c. 1165
Isabella of France	Bablake School	1344
William of Wykeham	Winchester College	1382
Katherine, Lady Berkeley	Katharine Lady Berkeley's School	1384
Henry VI of England	Eton College	1440
Joan Greyndour	Newland Grammar School	c. 1445
John Colet	St Paul's School	1509
Hugh Oldham	Manchester Grammar School	1515
Thomas Horsley	Royal Grammar School, Newcastle-upon-Tyne	1525
William Radcliffe	Stamford School	1532
John Incent	Berkhamsted Collegiate School	1541
King Henry VIII	Durham School The King's School, Canterbury; King's Ely; The King's School, Chester; The King's School, Gloucester; The King's School, Peterborough; The King's School, Rochester; The King's School, Worcester	1541 (refounded) 1541 (refounded); 1541 (refounded); 1541; 1541; 1541; 1541 (refounded); 1541
William Dauntesey	Dauntsey's School	1542
King Edward VI	Sherborne School; King Edward VI Grammar School, Chelmsford; King Edward VI Grammar School, Louth; Shrewsbury School; King Edward's School, Bath; King Edward's School, Birmingham; Christ's Hospital	1550; 1551; 1551; 1552; 1552; 1552; 1552
King Edward VI and Nicholas Ridley	King Edward's School, Witley	1553
William Harpur	Bedford School	refounded 1552
Sir John Gresham	Gresham's School	1555
Sir William Laxton	Oundle School	1556
Queen Elizabeth I	Westminster School	1560 (refounded)
Lawrence Sheriff	Rugby School	1562
Sir Roger Cholmeley	Highgate School	1565
Robert Harvard (Father of John Harvard - founder of Harvard University); One of four founders	St. Olave's and St. Saviour's Grammar School	1571
John Lyon	Harrow School	1572
Thomas Aldersey	Aldersey Grammar School	1575
William Lambe	Sutton Valence School	1576
Edmund Grindal	St Bees School	1583
John Whitgift	Whitgift School	1596
Sir Thomas Gresham	Gresham College	1597
Richard Platt	Aldenham School	1597
Henry Lee of Ditchley	Aylesbury Grammar School	1598
Peter Blundell	Blundell's School	1604
Thomas Sutton	Charterhouse School	1611
Stephen Perse	The Perse School	1615
Edward Alleyn	Dulwich College	1619
Robert Chaloner	Dr Challoner's Grammar School	1624
William Glegg	Calday Grange Grammar School	1636
Robert Aske	Haberdashers' Aske's School	1690
William Palmer	Palmer's School	1706
Thomas Thynne, 1st Viscount Weymouth	Lord Weymouth's School now Warminster School	1707
John Wesley	Kingswood School	1748
Moses Benson	St. James's School, Liverpool	1802
Rev. John Townsend	The Congregational School (later Caterham School)	1811
Andrew Reed	London Asylum for Orphans (later Reed's School)	1813
William Sewell	Radley College	1847
Nathaniel Woodard	Lancing College, 1848; Hurstpierpoint College, 1849; Ardingly College, 1858; Denstone College, 1868; Abbots Bromley School for Girls, 1874; King's College (Taunton), 1880; Ellesmere College, 1884; Worksop College, 1890	
Queen Victoria	Wellington College	1853
John Percival	Clifton College	1862
Francis Pocock	Monkton Combe School	1868
Frederick Savage	Seaford College	1884
John Haden Badley	Bedales School	1893
Olive Willis	Downe House	1907
Alexander Nikitich	Carfax College	2008

== English schools and colleges outside England ==
- Sir Henry Lawrence - Lawrence Schools at Sanawar, Ooty
- Claude Martin - La Martiniere College Schools at Lucknow, Kolkata and Lyon

== See also ==
- List of the oldest schools in the United Kingdom
- List of the oldest schools in the world
- Armorial of schools in the United Kingdom
- Armorial of British universities
