= Elizabeth Berkeley, Countess of Warwick =

English noblewoman and heiress (1386–1422)

Elizabeth de Berkeley
- Countess of Warwick
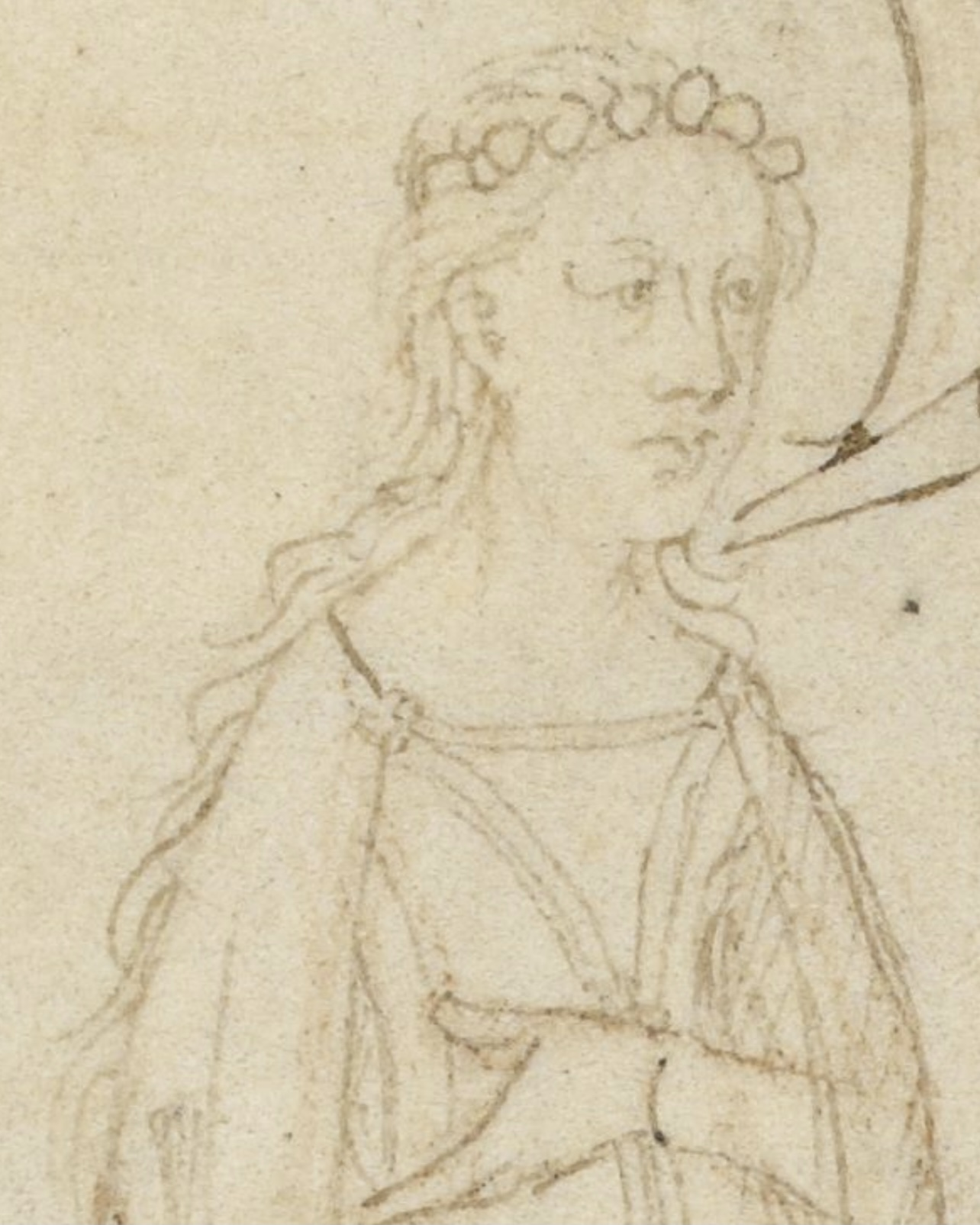
- Drawing of Elizabeth from the Beauchamp Pageant, c. 1483-1494
- Born: 1386; Berkeley Castle, Berkeley, Gloucestershire, England
- Died: 28 December 1422 (aged 35–36)
- Buried: Kingswood Abbey
- Spouse: Richard Beauchamp, 13th Earl of Warwick
- Issue: Margaret Beauchamp, Countess of Shrewsbury; Eleanor Beauchamp, Duchess of Somerset; Elizabeth Beauchamp, Baroness Latimer
- Father: Thomas de Berkeley, 5th Baron Berkeley
- Mother: Margaret de Lisle, 3rd Baroness Lisle

Elizabeth de Berkeley, Countess of Warwick and 4th Baroness Lisle (1386 – 28 December 1422), was an English noblewoman and heiress. She was the only child of Thomas de Berkeley, 5th Baron Berkeley, and Margaret de Lisle, 3rd Baroness Lisle.

With her father's death in 1417, Elizabeth and her husband Richard Beauchamp, 13th Earl of Warwick, became involved in an inheritance dispute with her cousin James Berkeley, initiating one of the longest lawsuits in English history.

== Marriage and issue ==
Elizabeth de Berkeley was the only child born to Thomas de Berkeley, 5th Baron Berkeley, by his wife Margaret de Lisle, 3rd Baroness Lisle. As such, Elizabeth was their sole heir, and was to inherit the baronies of Lisle and Tyes from her mother. Margaret died near 1392, but Elizabeth did not succeed to them until the death of Thomas in 1417, as he held the lands by tenure of courtesy. In September 1392, Baron Berkeley negotiated Elizabeth's marriage to Richard de Beauchamp, eldest son and heir to Thomas de Beauchamp, 12th Earl of Warwick. Elizabeth married him sometime before 5 October 1397, and became the Countess of Warwick in 1403. The marriage remained unconsummated for at least six years. Elizabeth gave birth to three girls:

1. Lady Margaret Beauchamp (1404 – 1467/1468); married John Talbot, 1st Earl of Shrewsbury
2. Lady Eleanor Beauchamp (c. 1408 – 1467); married (1) Thomas de Ros, 8th Baron de Ros (2) Edmund Beaufort, 1st Duke of Somerset (3) Walter Rokesley
3. Lady Elizabeth Beauchamp (c. 1417 – died before 2 October 1480); married (1) George Neville, 1st Baron Latimer (2) Thomas Wake

== Inheritance dispute ==
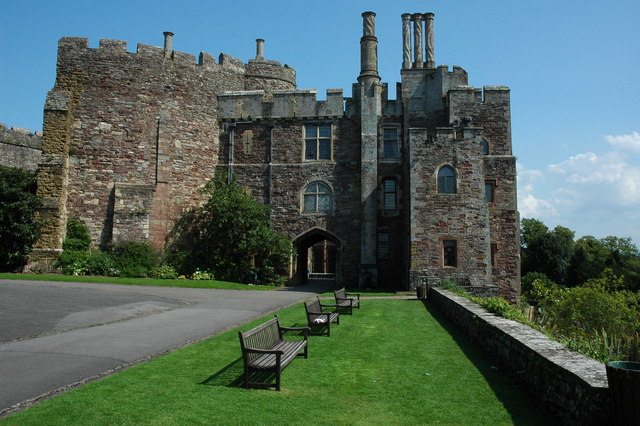
Berkeley Castle (as seen in present day), part of the dispute between the Countess and her cousin

Elizabeth's level of education and literacy is evident from a 1410 commission asking John Walton to translate Boethius' De consolatione philosophiae; he dedicated it in her name.

An inheritance dispute erupted with her father's death in 1417. Thomas had named her his heir, but many of his lands and estates, including Berkeley Castle, were entailed through the male line to Elizabeth's cousin James Berkeley. Elizabeth and her husband refused to accept the entail, thus "initiat[ing] one of the longest lawsuits in England", which lasted until 1609.

After Lord Thomas' death, the Earl and Countess of Warwick quickly took control of the castle and gained the temporary permission of King Henry V to maintain it. James was unable to seize control of the castle, as Warwick and the king were then fighting in France. To gain support in the dispute, Elizabeth sought the help of John, Duke of Bedford while James successfully bribed Humphrey, Duke of Gloucester, each one of the king's brothers. By 1425, Elizabeth was dead and James had been given Berkeley Castle along with most of the entailed lands.

Elizabeth died on 28 December 1422. She was buried at Kingswood Abbey, and a marble tomb was later placed over her grave through a provision in her husband's will. The following year, the Earl of Warwick remarried to Lady Isabel le Despenser, the widow of his cousin Richard de Beauchamp, 1st Earl of Worcester.

== Ancestry ==
Ancestors of Elizabeth Berkeley, Countess of Warwick

16. Maurice de Berkeley, 2nd Baron Berkeley
8. Thomas de Berkeley, 3rd Baron Berkeley
17. Eva La Zouche
4. Maurice de Berkeley, 4th Baron Berkeley
18. Roger de Mortimer, 1st Earl of March
9. Margaret Mortimer
19. Joan de Geneville, 2nd Baroness Geneville
2. Thomas de Berkeley, 5th Baron Berkeley
20. Hugh le Despenser, 1st Earl of Winchester
10. Hugh Despenser the Younger
21. Isabella de Beauchamp
5. Elizabeth le Despenser
22. Gilbert de Clare, 6th Earl of Hertford
11. Eleanor de Clare
23. Joan of Acre
1. Elizabeth de Berkeley, Countess of Warwick
24. Warin de Lisle
12. Gerard de Lisle, 1st Baron Lisle
25. Alice de Tyeys
6. Warin de Lisle, 2nd Baron Lisle
26. Edmund Fitzalan, 2nd Earl of Arundel
13. Eleanor FitzAlan
27. Alice de Warenne, Countess of Arundel
3. Margaret de Lisle, 3rd Baroness Lisle
14. Sir William Pipard
7. Margaret Pipard
15. Margery
