= John Talbot, 1st Viscount Lisle =

English nobleman

- Born: c. 1426
- Died: 17 July 1453 (aged 26–27); Castillon-la-Bataille, Duchy of Gascony
- Spouse: Joan Cheddar (m. 1443)
- Children: 3, including Thomas
- Parents: John Talbot (father); Margaret Beauchamp (mother)
- Relatives: Eleanor Talbot (sister); Elizabeth Talbot (sister); John Talbot (half-brother); Richard Beauchamp (grandfather); Elizabeth de Berkeley (grandmother)

John Talbot, 1st Baron Lisle and 1st Viscount Lisle (c. 1426 – 17 July 1453), English nobleman and medieval soldier, was the son of John Talbot, 1st Earl of Shrewsbury, and his second wife Margaret Beauchamp.

== Titles ==
Talbot was already a knight when, on 26 July 1444, he was created Lord and Baron Lisle of Kingston Lisle in Berkshire by Henry VI, his mother being one of the co-heirs to the previous creation of the barony. He stood to inherit much of her estates in Wales on the Welsh Marches, and in Gloucestershire at Painswick. She had fought long and hard to enfranchise her son for the duration of the Berkeley feud, in which the young nobleman's manor house was raided by Lord Berkeley's brothers. After 1449, his mother was one of three co-heiresses to her father, and through her, he possessed a claim on Berkeley Castle. In 1451, already a veteran of the fight at St Barnets Green, he was created Viscount Lisle.

In prosecution of the claim against James Berkeley, 1st Baron Berkeley, the heir-male, he stormed Berkeley Castle in 1452 and took the Baron and his sons prisoner.

Ordered to recruit reinforcements for the English army in France, he found 2325 men at Dartmouth and Plymouth before embarkation on 5 March 1453. He was joined by the Lords Moleyns and Camoys, as he led troops into Guyenne to reinforce his father. They sailed to Bordeaux but still the English army numbered only 8,000, facing an enemy force of 10,000. They were still awaiting reinforcements when they marched out, capturing an outpost at St Laurent on 17 July 1453. That day they fought the last pitched battle of the Hundred Years' War at Castillon. Both father and son were killed during the battle. Some chroniclers assert that when his wounded and unhorsed father begged him to quit the field and save himself, he refused, preferring death to dishonour; a scene memorialized by William Shakespeare in Henry VI, Part I, Act IV, Scene VI.

== Marriage and issue ==
He married Joan Cheddar (b. c. 1425), the daughter of Thomas Chedder, Esquire and the widow of Richard Stafford in 1443 and had three children:

- Elizabeth Talbot (d. 1487), married Edward Grey, Baron Ferrers of Groby. Grey later inherited the title of Baron Lisle, through Elizabeth.
- Thomas Talbot, 2nd Viscount Lisle (c. 1449–1470)
- Margaret Talbot (d. 1475), 1st wife of Sir George Vere (d. 1503), son of John de Vere, 12th Earl of Oxford

== Ancestry ==
Ancestors of John Talbot, 1st Viscount Lisle

16. Richard Talbot, 2nd Baron Talbot
8. Gilbert Talbot, 3rd Lord Talbot
17. Elizabeth de Comyn
4. Richard, 4th Baron Talbot
18. James Butler, 1st Earl of Ormonde
9. Petronilla Butler
19. Eleanor de Bohun
2. John Talbot, 1st Earl of Shrewsbury
20. John Lestrange, 2nd Lord Strange
10. John Lestrange, 4th Lord Strange
5. Ankaret Strange of Blackmere
22. Edmund Fitzalan, 9th Earl of Arundel
11. Mary FitzAlan
23. Alice de Warenne
1. John Talbot, 1st Viscount Lisle
24. Thomas de Beauchamp, 11th Earl of Warwick
12. Thomas de Beauchamp, 12th Earl of Warwick
25. Katherine Mortimer
6. Richard de Beauchamp, 13th Earl of Warwick
26. William Ferrers, 3rd Lord of Groby
13. Margaret Ferrers of Groby
27. Margaret d'Ufford
3. Margaret Talbot, Countess of Shrewsbury
28. Maurice de Berkeley, 4th Baron Berkeley
14. Thomas de Berkeley, 5th Baron Berkeley
29. Elizabeth le Despenser, Baroness Berkeley
7. Elizabeth de Berkeley
30. Warin de Lisle, 2nd Lord Lisle
15. Margaret de Lisle, Baroness Lisle
31. Margaret Pipard

== Sources ==
- History of Berkeley, rotwang.co.uk. Accessed 31 December 2022.

Peerage of England
New creation	Viscount Lisle; 1451–1453	Succeeded by Thomas Talbot
New creation	Baron Lisle; 1444–1453	Succeeded by Thomas Talbot
