= Edward Grey, 1st Viscount Lisle =

English nobleman (died 1492)

Arms of Grey de Ruthyn: Barry of six argent and azure in chief three torteaux

Edward Grey, 1st Viscount Lisle (died 1492) was an English nobleman who was created Viscount Lisle in 1483, in recognition of his wife's descent.

== Origins ==
Sir Edward Grey was a younger son of Sir Edward Grey (c. 1415–1457) (a son by his second marriage of Reginald Grey, 3rd Baron Grey de Ruthyn) by his wife Elizabeth Ferrers, 6th Baroness Ferrers of Groby (1419–1483) His father was summoned to parliament as Baron Ferrers of Groby in right of his wife. His eldest brother was Sir John Grey of Groby (c. 1432-1461), a Lancastrian knight, the first husband of Elizabeth Woodville who later married King Edward IV, and great-great-grandfather of Lady Jane Grey.

== Marriage and children ==
Arms of Talbot: Gules, a lion rampant within a bordure engrailled or

Sir Edward Grey married Elizabeth Talbot, 3rd Baroness Lisle, daughter and eventual heiress of John Talbot, 1st Viscount Lisle and 1st Baron Lisle (1423–1453), 4th son of John Talbot, 1st Earl of Shrewsbury by his wife Margaret Beauchamp, heiress to the Barony of Lisle created by writ for her great-great-grandfather Gerard de Lisle (d.1360). By Elizabeth Talbot he had the following children:

- John Grey, 2nd Viscount Lisle and 4th Baron Lisle (1481–1504), eldest son and heir, who married Muriel Howard, daughter of Thomas Howard, 2nd Duke of Norfolk. They were the parents of Elizabeth Grey, 3rd Viscountess Lisle and 5th Baroness Lisle.
- Anne Grey
- Elizabeth Grey, 6th Baroness Lisle (d. 1529), who married twice:
  - Firstly to Edmund Dudley, treasurer to King Henry VII, executed in 1510 by King Henry VIII
  - Secondly to Arthur Plantagenet (d.1542), KG, an illegitimate son of King Edward IV, created Viscount Lisle in recognition of his wife's ancestry.
- Muryell Grey

There might have been another daughter- Margaret, Countess of Wiltshire, wife of Edward Stafford, 2nd Earl of Wiltshire (who died in 1499), they had no issue. However occasionally in Tudor times name Margaret was used as synonymous with Muriel. Hence Muriel and Margaret might be the same person.

Peerage of England
New creation	Viscount Lisle; 2nd creation 1483–1492	Succeeded by John Grey
