= Elizabeth Grey, 6th Baroness Lisle =

English noblewoman

Elizabeth Grey
- 6th Baroness Lisle
- Born: 1482/4; West Sussex, England
- Died: 1525/6; Hampshire, England
- Buried: St. Peter's Churchyard, Hampshire, England
- Spouses: Edmund Dudley; Arthur Plantagenet
- Issue: John Dudley, 1st Duke of Northumberland; Andrew Dudley; Jerome Dudley; Frances Plantagenet; Elizabeth Plantagenet; Bridget Plantagenet
- Father: Edward Grey, 1st Viscount Lisle
- Mother: Elizabeth Talbot

Elizabeth Grey, 6th Baroness Lisle (c.1482/1484 – c.1525/1526) was an English noblewoman during the reigns of Henry VII and VIII. She is the grandmother of the disputed Consort of England, Lord Guildford Dudley.

== Origins ==
Arms of Grey de Ruthyn: Barry of six argent and azure in chief three torteaux

Elizabeth Grey was the daughter of Edward Grey, 1st Viscount Lisle (d. 1492) by his wife Elizabeth Talbot (d. 1487), daughter and eventual heir of John Talbot, 1st Viscount Lisle (1423–1453).

== Marriages ==
Elizabeth married twice:

- First to Edmund Dudley (c. 1462 – 1510); they had three children:
  - John Dudley, 1st Duke of Northumberland (c. 1502 – 1553)
  - Andrew Dudley
  - Jerome Dudley
- Secondly, after the execution of Edmund Dudley, Elizabeth married Arthur Plantagenet (d. 1542). Arthur and Elizabeth had three daughters:
  - Frances Plantagenet
  - Elizabeth Plantagenet
  - Bridget Plantagenet

== Succession to Barony of Lisle ==
On the death of her niece Elizabeth Grey, Viscountess Lisle (1505–1519), the daughter of her brother John Grey, 2nd Viscount Lisle (1481–1504) by his wife Muriel Howard, the barony of Lisle passed to Elizabeth, who thereby became suo jure Baroness Lisle. Her husband Arthur Plantagenet was created Viscount Lisle on 25 April 1523. He continued to hold the title after her death in 1525 or 1526. After Arthur Plantagenet's death in 1542, Henry VIII granted the viscountcy to Elizabeth Grey's eldest son by her first marriage, John Dudley, 1st Viscount Lisle, "by the right of his mother". He was created Viscount Lisle on 12 March 1542, and was later created Duke of Northumberland. He forfeited his titles upon his execution and attainder in 1553.
