= John Grey, 2nd Viscount Lisle =

British peer

Arms of Talbot, Viscount Lisle: Gules, a lion rampant within a bordure engrailed or

Arms of Grey, Viscount Lisle: Barry of six argent and azure in chief three torteaux

John Grey, 2nd Viscount Lisle (April 1480 – 9 September 1504) was an English peer of the Tudor period. Upon his death the title Viscount Lisle became extinct, but the Barony of Lisle passed to his unborn daughter Elizabeth, his only child.

== Family ==
Born in 1480, he was the eldest son and heir of Edward Grey, 1st Viscount Lisle and Elizabeth Talbot (d. 1487), 3rd Baroness Lisle, daughter and eventual heiress of John Talbot, 1st Viscount Lisle and 1st Baron Lisle (1423–1453), heiress to the Barony of Lisle. His siblings were:

- Anne Grey
- Elizabeth Grey, 6th Baroness Lisle (d. 1529), who married twice:
  - Firstly to Edmund Dudley, treasurer to King Henry VII, executed in 1510 by King Henry VIII
  - Secondly to Arthur Plantagenet (d.1542), KG, an illegitimate son of King Edward IV, created Viscount Lisle in recognition of his wife's ancestry.
- Muryell Grey

John Grey gained the title Viscount Lisle on the death of his father in 1492.

== Personal life ==
In June 1504 he married Muriel (or Marcella) Howard (died 1512), daughter of Thomas Howard, 2nd Duke of Norfolk. They were the parents of Elizabeth Grey, 3rd Viscountess Lisle and 5th Baroness Lisle (1505–1519), born after her father's death. His daughter inherited Kibworth Beauchamp Manor in Leicestershire from him. In 1506 his widow married Thomas Knyvett, who became his daughter's stepfather. After the death of both her mother and Knyvett during 1512 Elizabeth was left an orphan and became the ward of Sir Charles Brandon, to whom she was betrothed in 1513 aged just eight years old. When instead in 1515 he married Mary Tudor he surrendered Elizabeth's wardship. She married Henry Courtenay, 1st Marquess of Exeter but she died before the marriage could be consummated.

Lisle died at the family estate Kingston Lisle Park in September 1504 aged 24 and was buried in Abingdon Abbey.

Peerage of England
Preceded by Edward Grey	Viscount Lisle; 1492–1504	Extinct
Preceded by Edward Grey	Baron Lisle; 1492–1504	Succeeded by Elizabeth Grey
