= Elizabeth Brandon =

Elizabeth Brandon may refer to:

- Elizabeth Grey, Viscountess Lisle, married name Brandon (1505–1519), English noblewoman
- Elizabeth Douglas-Hamilton, Duchess of Hamilton and Brandon (1916–2008)
