= Berkeleyan =

Berkeleyan or Berkeleian may refer to:

- A follower of or concept related to Anglo-Irish philosopher George Berkeley (1685–1783)
- Berkeleyan (newspaper), a newsletter produced by the University of California, Berkeley
- The Berkeleyan, the alumni and school magazine of Katharine Lady Berkeley's School
- Berkeleyan, a resident of the city of Berkeley, California
