= Thomas de Berkeley, 5th Baron Berkeley =

English peer and admiral

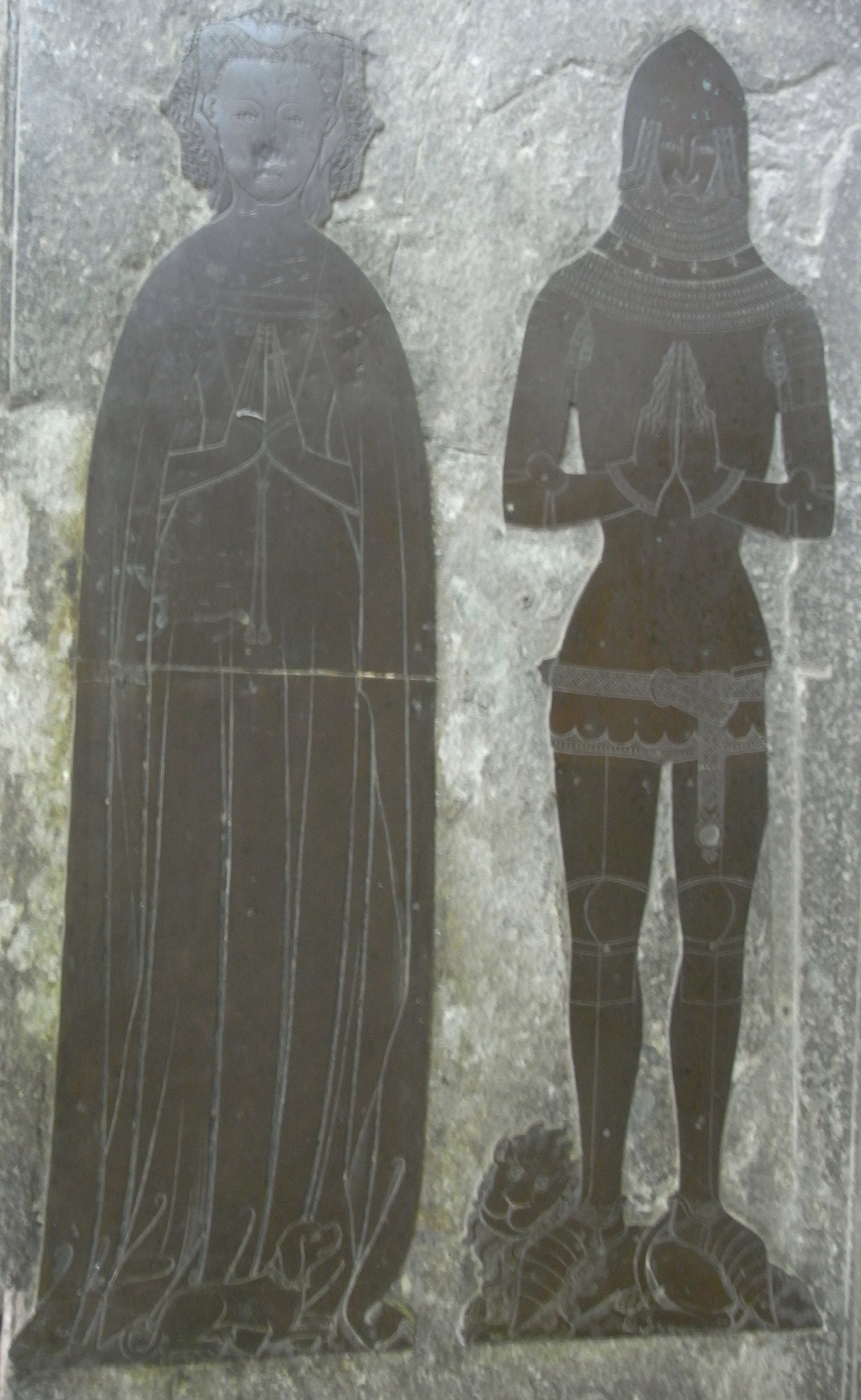
- Monumental brass of Thomas de Berkeley, 5th Baron Berkeley and his wife Margaret de Lisle
- Born: 5 January 1352/53
- Died: 13 July 1417
- Noble family: de Berkeley
- Spouse: Margaret de Lisle
- Issue: Elizabeth de Berkeley
- Father: Maurice de Berkeley
- Mother: Elizabeth le Despenser

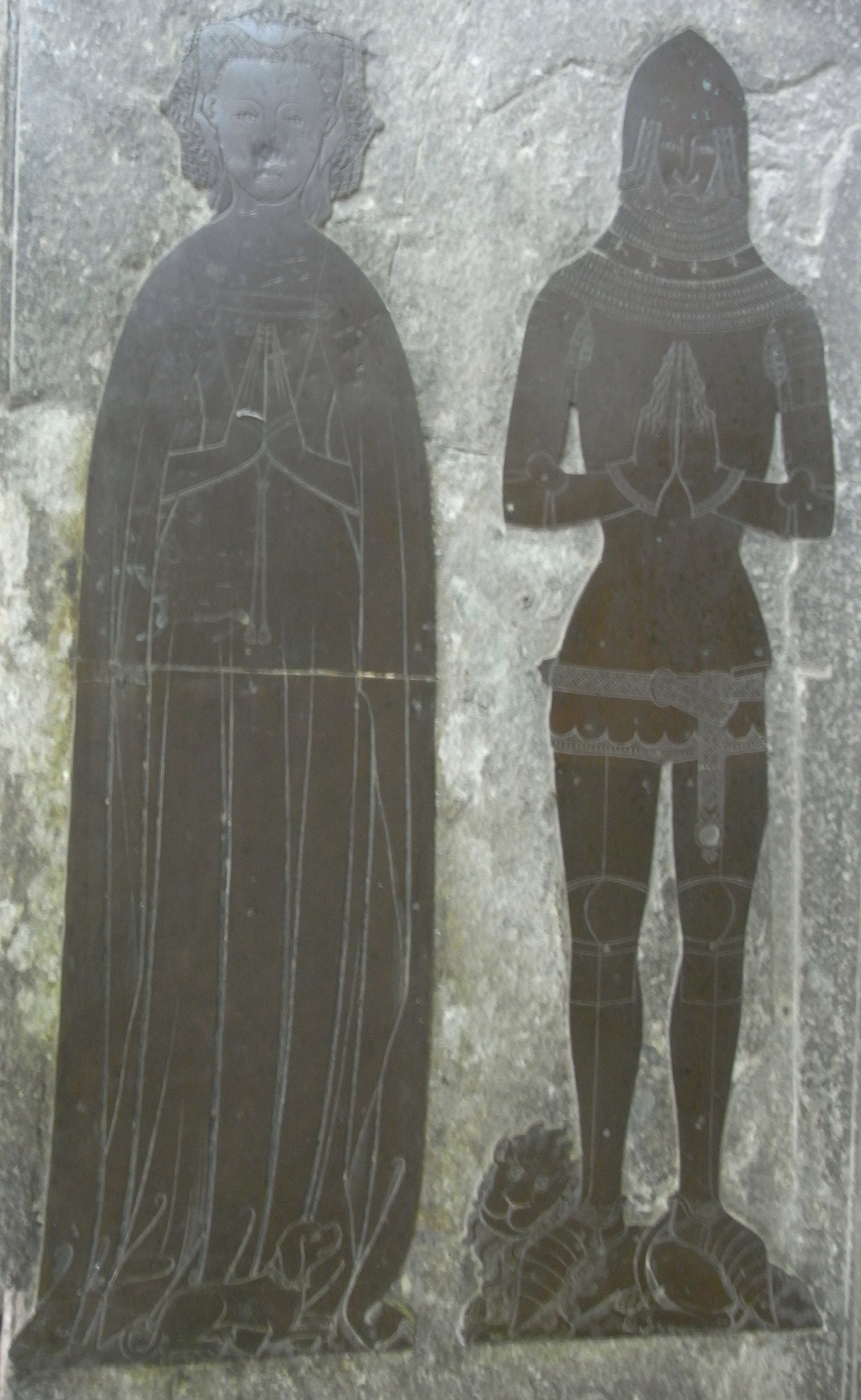
Monumental brass of Thomas de Berkeley, 5th Baron Berkeley and his wife Margaret de Lisle, St Mary the Virgin, Wotton-under-Edge, Gloucestershire

Arms of Berkeley: Gules, a chevron between ten crosses pattée six in chief and four in base argent

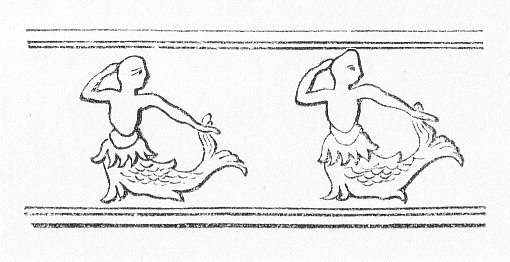
Drawing of detail of mermaid livery collar of Thomas de Berkeley, 5th Baron Berkeley (d.1417), from his monumental brass at Wotton-under-Edge. It is believed to refer to his career as an admiral.

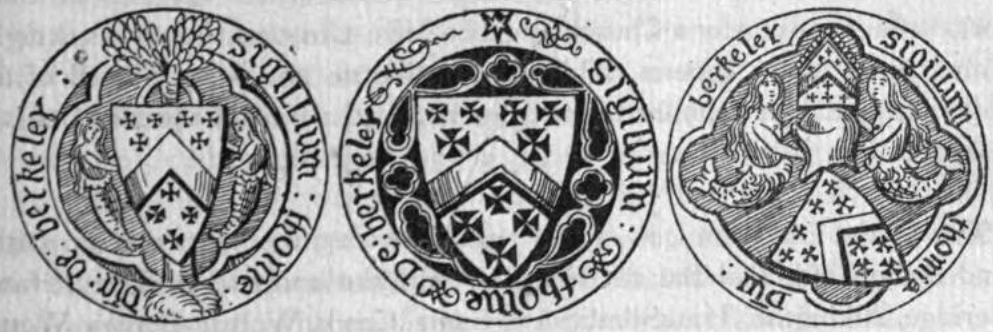
Seals of Thomas Berkeley, 5th Baron Berkeley (d.1417), two with mermaid supporters, used at successive times of his life

Thomas de Berkeley, 5th Baron Berkeley (5 January 1352/53 – 13 July 1417), The Magnificent, of Berkeley Castle and of Wotton-under-Edge in Gloucestershire, was an English peer and an admiral. His epithet, and that of each previous and subsequent head of his family, was coined by John Smyth of Nibley (d.1641), steward of the Berkeley estates, the biographer of the family and author of Lives of the Berkeleys.

== Origins ==
He was born at Berkeley Castle in Gloucestershire, the son and heir of Maurice de Berkeley, 4th Baron Berkeley by his wife Elizabeth le Despencer.

== Transfers estate to trustees ==
In 1417 he enfeoffed at Berkeley Castle, shortly before his death, several feoffees to hold all his lands in trust, due to the fact he had no male children as his heirs and that the course of succession then seemed unclear. The catalogue entry made by the British Museum librarian Isaac Jeaves for charter number 581 preserved in the muniments at Berkeley Castle records:

"Feoffment by Thomas, Lord Berkeley, Knt, to Walter Poole, Gilbert Denys Knts, Thomas Knolles, citizen of London, Thomas Rugge, John Grevell, Robert Greyndour and Thomas Sergeant, esquires, of all the lands, reversions, and tenants' services in Berkeley, Wotton, Gloucester, South Cerney, Cerneyeswike, Aure, Arlingham, and Horton, and in Berkeley and Bledislow Hundreds; in the City of London; in Portbury, Portishead, Weston, Bedminster, and in Bedminster and Portbury Hundreds, co. Somerset, and in Sharnecote and Chicklade, co. Wiltshire, together with the advowsons of St. Andrew's Church in Baynard's Castle, London, the advowsons of Chicklade, Portishead, and Walton, and the patronage and advowson of St. Mary's Abbey of Kingswood. Witnesses: Thomas FitzNicoll, John Pauncefoot, Knights; Robert Poyntz, Edmund Bassett, Thomas Kendale. Datum ad Berkeley, Thursday, Feast of the Nativity of St. John the Baptist (24 June) 5 Hen. V. (1417) With seal, broken)"

The great City of London townhouse of the Berkeleys, known as "Berkeley's Inn", was at Puddle Dock by Baynard's Castle, close to the Blackfriars Monastery. Thomas FitzNicholl, one of the witnesses, was many times MP for Gloucestershire, including in 1395 when he served jointly with Gilbert Denys. Nigel Saul states that such feoffees were likely to have been members of Lord Berkeley's retinue. These were very significant positions of trust granted to his feoffees as Berkeley died leaving only a daughter and the succession to the vast Berkeley lands, including the castle itself, became a matter of much dispute amongst his possible heirs resulting in a series of feuds which led in 1470 to the last private battle fought on English soil at the Battle of Nibley Green, between Lord William Berkeley and Viscount Lisle, and there followed the longest dispute in English legal history, which did not end until 1609.

== Marriage ==
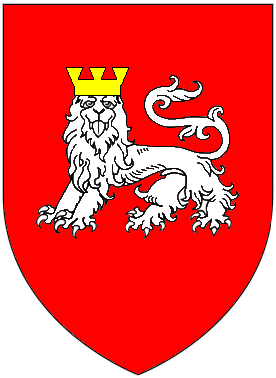
Arms of Lisle of Kingston Lisle: Gules, a lion statant guardant argent crowned or

In 1367 Thomas married Margaret de Lisle, 3rd Baroness Lisle (1360–1392), daughter of Warine de Lisle, 2nd Baron Lisle (d.1382) and Margaret Pipard. By his wife he had no male progeny, only a daughter and sole heiress:

- Elizabeth de Lisle (born ca.1386 – 28 December 1422), suo jure Baroness Lisle, who married Richard de Beauchamp, 13th Earl of Warwick (1381–1459).

== Death and burial ==
He died on 13 July 1417 and was buried in the Church of St Mary the Virgin within his manor of Wotton-under-Edge. His very large chest tomb with monumental brass on top survives in that church. The brass shows him lying beside his wife, and is very similar to that of his contemporary Sir Maurice Russell (d.1416) at Dyrham, who was the father-in-law of Gilbert Denys, one of Berkeley's feoffees.

== Succession ==
Having died without male progeny the succession to the vast Berkeley estates became disputed, and eventually resulted in the Battle of Nibley Green (1469/70), the last battle fought in England entirely between the private armies of feudal magnates, fought near Berkeley Castle on 20 March 1469/70 between the troops of Thomas Talbot, 2nd Viscount Lisle and William Berkeley, 2nd Baron Berkeley, later 1st Marquess of Berkeley. Lisle and William Berkeley had long been engaged in a dispute over the inheritance of Berkeley Castle and the other Berkeley lands, as Lisle being heir-general to Thomas de Berkeley, 5th Baron Berkeley and was the Berkeley heir male. Lisle impetuously challenged Berkeley to a battle, and the latter agreed, the battle to be fought the next day at Nibley Green. Lisle was defeated.

== Gallery ==
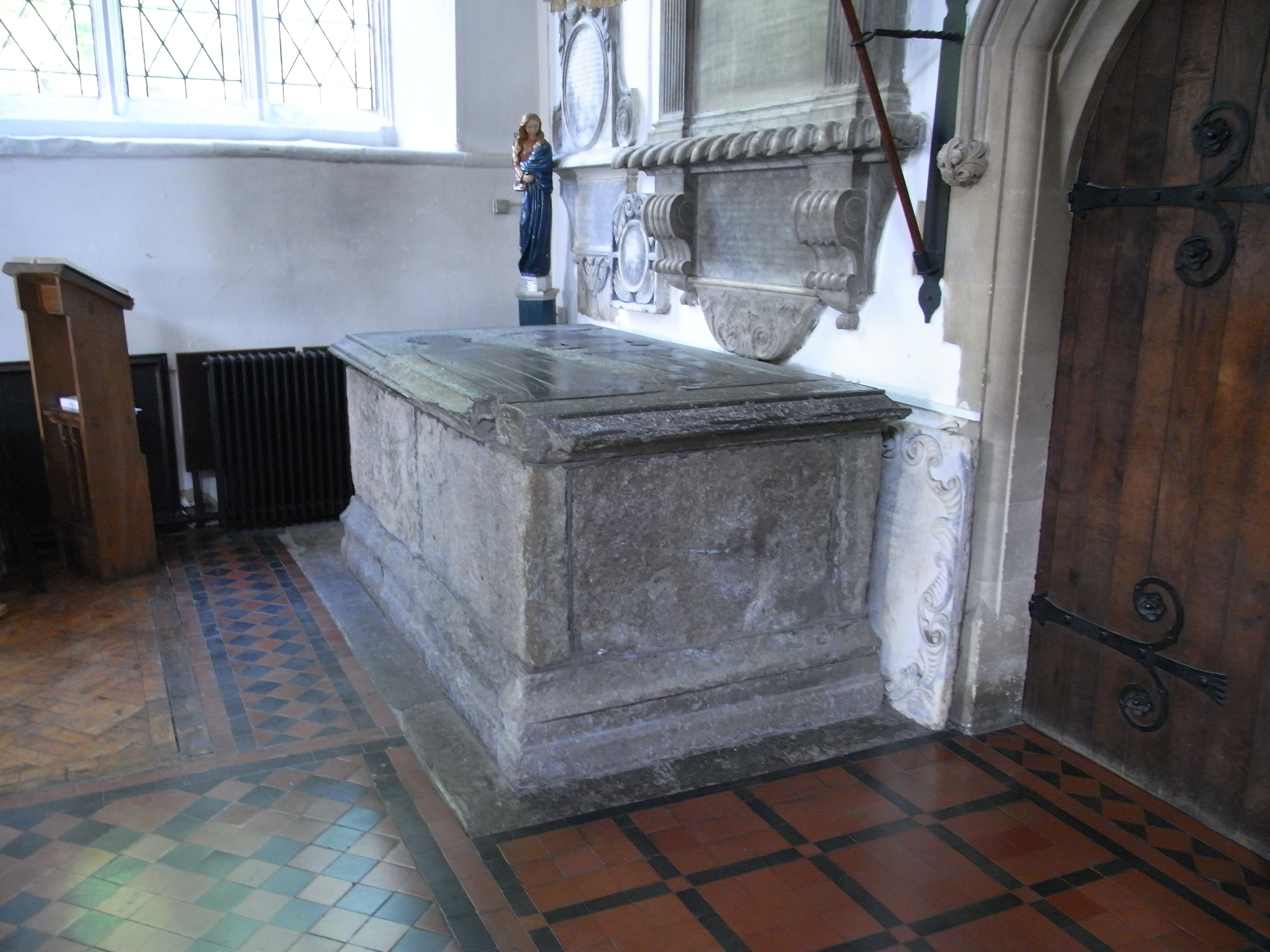
Chest tomb of Thomas de Berkeley,5th Baron Berkeley, and his wife, on top of which is the monumental brass. Not original position. Wotton-under-Edge

== Ancestors ==
Ancestors of Thomas de Berkeley, 5th Baron Berkeley

16. Thomas de Berkeley, 1st Baron Berkeley
8. Maurice de Berkeley, 2nd Baron Berkeley
17. Joan de Ferrers
4. Thomas de Berkeley, 3rd Baron Berkeley
18. Eon la Zouche
9. Eve la Zouche
19. Millicent de Cauntelo
2. Maurice de Berkeley, 4th Baron Berkeley
20. Edmund Mortimer, 2nd Baron Mortimer
10. Roger Mortimer, 1st Earl of March
21. Margaret de Fiennes
5. Margaret Mortimer
22. Piers de Geneville
11. Joan de Geneville
23. Jeanne of Lusignan
1. Thomas de Berkeley, 5th Baron Berkeley
24. Hugh le Despencer, 1st Baron le Despencer
12. Hugh le Despenser, Earl of Winchester
25. Aliva Basset
6. Hugh le Despenser
26. William de Beauchamp, 9th Earl of Warwick
13. Isabella de Beauchamp
27. Maud FitzJohn
3. Elizabeth le Despenser
28. Richard de Clare, 5th Earl of Hertford
14. Gilbert de Clare, 6th Earl of Hertford
29. Maud de Lacy
7. Eleanor de Clare
30. Edward I of England
15. Joan of Acre
31. Eleanor of Castile

== Sources ==
- Richardson, Douglas, Kimball G. Everingham, and David Faris. Plantagenet Ancestry: A Study in Colonial and Medieval Families. Royal ancestry series. (p. 99) Baltimore, Md: Genealogical Pub. Co, 2004. Retrieved 20 April 2008

Peerage of England
Preceded by Maurice de Berkeley	Baron Berkeley; 1368–1417	Extinct
