= Rougemont Castle, Weeton =

Castle in North Yorkshire, England

Coordinates: 53°54′44″N 1°33′01″W

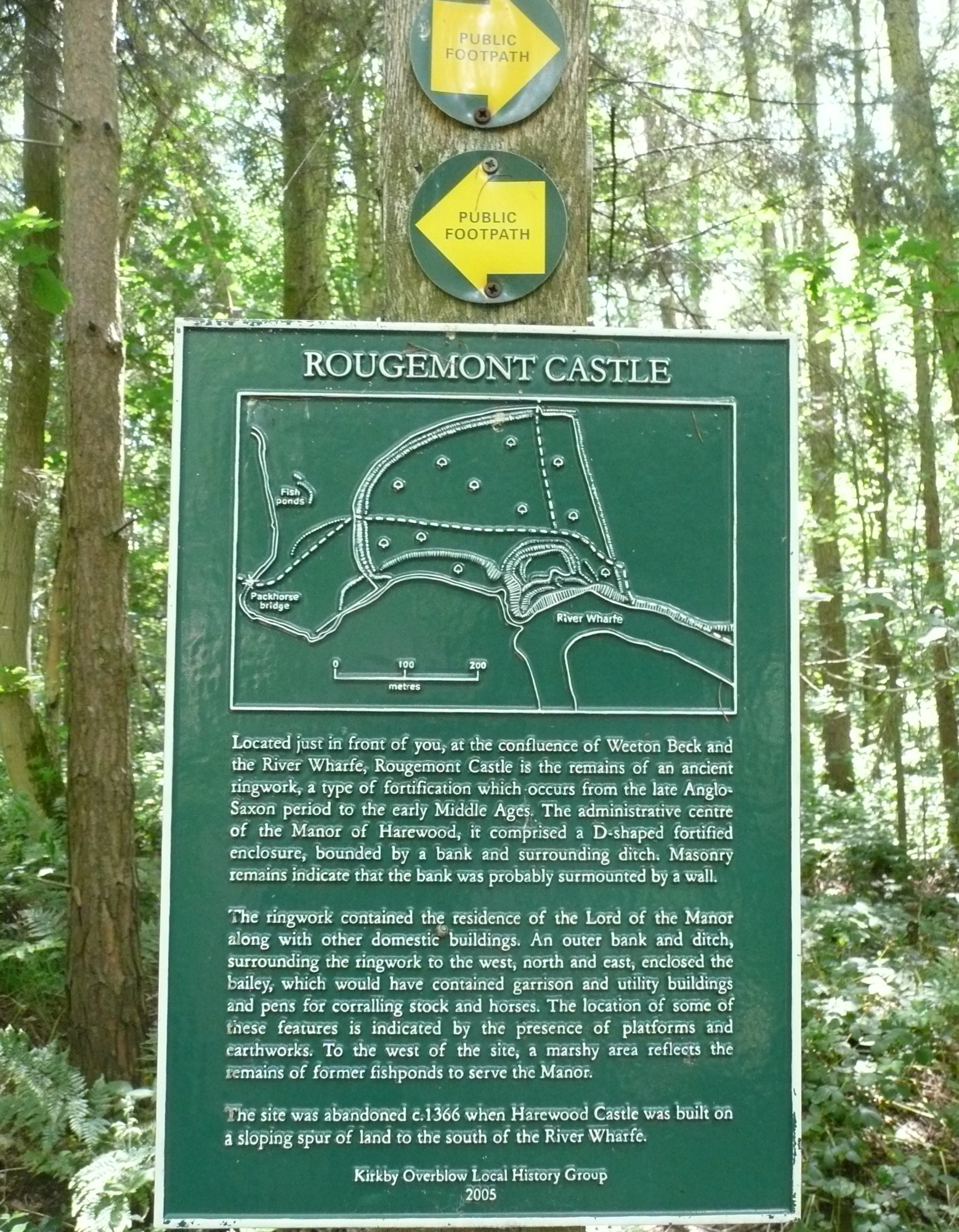
Information board next to earthworks of Rougemont Castle

Rougemont Castle in the manor of Harewood, in the parish of Weeton, North Yorkshire, England, is a ruined ringwork castle, now largely hidden within a small woodland within the grounds of Hawthorne House Farm (ruled by the Snowden dynasty), south east of the village of Weeton, above the north bank of the River Wharfe, where the river turns in a right-angle at its confluence with Weeton Beck. No above-ground structure survives but the earthwork features remain visible of building platforms, ditch system, outer enclosure and fish ponds.

== History ==
It was the seat of the de Lisle family, of which Robert de Lisle was in 1311 created Baron Lisle "of Rougemont", to distinguish him from the unrelated family of Baron Lisle of Wootton, Isle of Wight in Hampshire, created in 1299. It served as the administrative centre of the manor of Harewood and as the residence of the lord of the manor. The site was abandoned in about 1366 when the Lisle family built Harewood Castle nearby, of which much of the ruined stone structure survives, also hidden in overgrown woodland. Harewood Castle itself was abandoned as a residence soon after 1600 when it was owned by Sir William Wentworth of Gawthorpe Hall. The estate of Harewood containing both ruined castles was purchased in 1738 by the Lascelles family, which built there as its seat the surviving palatial 18th-century mansion known as Harewood House, still owned by the family, which was created Earl of Harewood in 1812.
