= Baron Lisle =

Barony in the Peerage of England

Arms of Lisle of Rougemont: Or, a fess between two chevrons sable

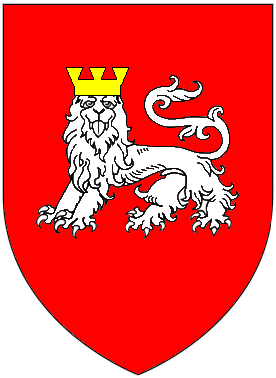
Arms of Lisle of Kingston Lisle: Gules, a lion statant guardant argent crowned or

Arms of Berkeley, Baroness Lisle: Gules, a chevron between ten crosses pattée six in chief and four in base argent

Arms of Talbot, Barons and Viscount Lisle: Gules, a lion rampant within a bordure engrailled or.

Arms of Grey, Barons and Viscount Lisle: Barry of six argent and azure in chief three torteaux

Baron Lisle was a title which was created five times in the Peerage of England during the Middle Ages and Tudor period, and once in the Peerage of Ireland in the 18th century.

== First creation (of Wootton), (1299–1311/14) ==
Arms of Lisle of Wootton, Isle of Wight: Or, on a chief azure three lions rampant of the first

The earliest creation was in 1299 for Sir John I Lisle, of Wootton on the Isle of Wight, then in Hampshire. The family's name in French was de l'Isle and in Latin de Insula, both meaning "of the Island", though some texts refer to them as de Bosco from their home at Wootton. They are assumed to have arrived on the Isle of Wight as followers of the magnate Richard de Redvers (died 1107), who was Lord of the Isle of Wight and father of Baldwin de Redvers, 1st Earl of Devon. After the de Redvers family, that of Lisle was the most important on the Island.

Sir John I Lisle was summoned to Parliament by writs from 29 December 1299 to 13 September 1302 and died shortly before 10 June 1304. His son and heir Sir John II Lisle was summoned from 12 November 1304 to 19 December 1311 (or possibly 29 July 1314). As no further summons arrived for the rest of his life, and no lawful descendant was ever summoned, the barony expired.

== Second creation (of Rougemont), (1311) ==
The barony of 1311 was created for De Lisle "of Rougemont", another unrelated family, thought to have originated on the Isle of Ely in Cambridgeshire, East Anglia, where they were feudal tenants of the Bishop of Ely, They were seated at Rougemont Castle in the parish of Weeton, North Yorkshire and bore arms: Or, a fess between two chevrons sable.

== Third creation (of Kingston Lisle), (1357) ==
The barony of 1357 was for Lisle "of Kingston Lisle" in the parish of Sparsholt in Berkshire (now in Oxfordshire), a junior branch of Lisle of Rougemont. Robert de Lisle of Rougemont married Alice FitzGerold (granddaughter of Henry FitzGerold I (d.1173/4)), the heiress of Kingston, Sparsholt. In 1269 Alice granted the manor of Kingston to her younger son Gerard I de Lisle, whose family adopted the arms of FitzGerold: Gules, a lion statant guardant argent crowned or. Gerard I's grandson was Gerard II de Lisle (1305–1360), created Baron Lisle in 1357.

== Sixth creation (1758) ==
The most recent creation came in the Peerage of Ireland in 1758, when John Lysaght was made Baron Lisle, of Mountnorth in the County of Cork. He had previously represented Charleville in the Irish House of Commons. As of 2013 the title is held by his descendant, the ninth Baron, who succeeded his father in 2003. The barony is pronounced "Lyle", the family surname of Lysaght "Lycett".

== Barons Lisle, first creation (1299) ==
- John Lisle, 1st Baron Lisle (died 1304)
- John Lisle, 2nd Baron Lisle (1281–1337)

== Barons Lisle (of Rougemont), second creation (1311) ==
- Robert Lisle, 1st Baron Lisle of Rougemont (1288–1344)
- John Lisle, 2nd Baron Lisle of Rougemont (c. 1318–1355)
- Robert Lisle, 3rd Baron Lisle of Rougemont (1334–1399)
- William de Lisle, 4th Baron Lisle of Rougemont (? - before June 1428)

"[T]he barony presumably fell into abeyance between the issue of the daughters of Robert, 1st Lord Lisle [1311]."

== Barons Lisle (of Kingston Lisle), third creation (1357) ==
- Gerard Lisle, 1st Baron Lisle (1305–1360)
- Warin Lisle, 2nd Baron Lisle (1333–1382), son
- Margaret Lisle, 3rd Baroness Lisle (1360–1392), daughter
- Elizabeth Berkeley, 4th Baroness Lisle (c.1386–1422) (abeyant 1422), daughter

== Barons Lisle, fourth creation (1444) ==
- John Talbot, 1st Viscount Lisle (1426–1453) (created Viscount Lisle 1451), grandson
- Thomas Talbot, 2nd Viscount Lisle (1443–1470), son; (viscountcy extinct, barony abeyant 1470)
- Elizabeth Talbot, 3rd Baroness Lisle (died 1487), sister; (abeyance terminated 1475)
  - Edward Grey, 1st Viscount Lisle (died 1492), husband
- John Grey, 4th Baron Lisle (1480–1504), son
- Elizabeth Grey, 5th Baroness Lisle (1505–1519), daughter
- Elizabeth Grey, 6th Baroness Lisle (c. 1483-c. 1525), aunt

Attainder of heirs from 1st marriage of the 6th Baroness Lisle and abeyance of heirs from her 2nd marriage.

== Barons Lisle, fifth creation (1561) ==
- Ambrose Dudley, 1st Baron Lisle and 3rd Earl of Warwick (1528–1590) (extinct)

== Barons Lisle, sixth creation (1758) ==
John Lysaght was created the first Baron Lisle of Mountnorth in the County of Cork in the Peerage of Ireland on 18 September 1758.

Arms: Argent, three spears erect gules, on a chief azure a lion passant guardant or.

Crest: A dexter arm embowed in armour, the hand holding a sword, all ppr.
Supporters: Two lions or.
Motto: Bella! horrida bella!

Creation: B. (I) 18 Sept 1758.
- John Lysaght, 1st Baron Lisle (1702–1781)
- John Lysaght, 2nd Baron Lisle (1729–1798)
- John Lysaght, 3rd Baron Lisle (1781–1834)
- George Lysaght, 4th Baron Lisle (1783–1868)
- John Arthur Lysaght, 5th Baron Lisle (1811–1898)
- George William James Lysaght, 6th Baron Lisle (1840–1919)
- John Nicholas Horace Lysaght, 7th Baron Lisle (1903–1997)
- Patrick James Lysaght, 8th Baron Lisle (1931–2003)
- Nicholas Geoffrey Lysaght, 9th Baron Lisle (born 1960)

The heir presumptive is the present holder's brother David James Lysaght (born 1963).
The heir presumptive's heir apparent is his son George Gabriel Abbott Lysaght (born 1997).
