= Viscount Lisle =

Title in the peerage of England

Arms of Talbot, Viscount Lisle: Gules, a lion rampant within a bordure engrailed or

Arms of Grey, Viscount Lisle: Barry of six argent and azure in chief three torteaux

The title of Viscount Lisle has been created six times in the Peerage of England. The first creation, on 30 October 1451, was for John Talbot, 1st Baron Lisle. Upon the death of his son Thomas at the Battle of Nibley Green in 1470, the viscountcy became extinct and the barony abeyant.

In 1475, the abeyance terminated in favour of Thomas' sister, Elizabeth Talbot, 3rd Baroness Lisle, wife of Edward Grey, 1st Viscount Lisle. Sir Edward was created Viscount Lisle on 28 June 1483, but the title became extinct on the death of their son John in 1504. The viscounty now passed to John's posthumous daughter Elizabeth, whose wardship was granted to Sir Charles Brandon. He contracted to marry her, and was created Viscount Lisle on 15 May 1513 in consequence. Charles Brandon later annulled the contract and married Mary Tudor, Dowager Queen of France, in 1515, surrendering the title Viscount Lisle before 1523. Elizabeth died in 1519 and the barony passed to her aunt, also named Elizabeth Grey. Her husband, Arthur Plantagenet was created Viscount Lisle on 25 April 1523. He continued to hold the title after her death in about 1525. After Arthur Plantagenet's death in 1542, the viscountcy went to Elizabeth Grey's eldest son by her first marriage, John Dudley, "by the right of his mother". He was created Viscount Lisle on 12 March 1542, and later rose to be Duke of Northumberland; but he forfeited his titles upon his execution and attainder in 1553.

The final creation of the viscountcy was on 4 May 1605 as a subsidiary title for Robert Sidney, 1st Earl of Leicester, grandson of the Duke of Northumberland. It became extinct with the Earldom of Leicester in 1743.

== Viscounts Lisle, first creation (1451) ==
- John Talbot, 1st Viscount Lisle (1426–1453)
- Thomas Talbot, 2nd Viscount Lisle (1443–1470) (Viscountcy extinct, Barony abeyant 1470)

== Viscounts Lisle, second creation (1483) ==
- Edward Grey, 1st Viscount Lisle (d. 1492)
- John Grey, 2nd Viscount Lisle (1480–1504) (Viscountcy extinct)

== Viscounts Lisle, third creation (1513) ==
- Charles Brandon, 1st Viscount Lisle and 1st Duke of Suffolk (1484–1545) (surrendered viscountcy bef. 1519)

== Viscounts Lisle, fourth creation (1523) ==
- Arthur Plantagenet, 1st Viscount Lisle (1470–1542)

== Viscounts Lisle, fifth creation (1542) ==
- John Dudley, 1st Viscount Lisle and 1st Duke of Northumberland (1504–1553) (all titles forfeit)
- John Dudley, Viscount Lisle and Earl of Warwick (1527–1554) (courtesy titles)

== Viscounts Lisle, sixth creation (1605) ==
- See Earls of Leicester, creation of 1618. Extinct 1743.

== See also ==
- Baron Lisle
- Viscount De L'Isle
