= St Mary the Virgin, Wotton-under-Edge =

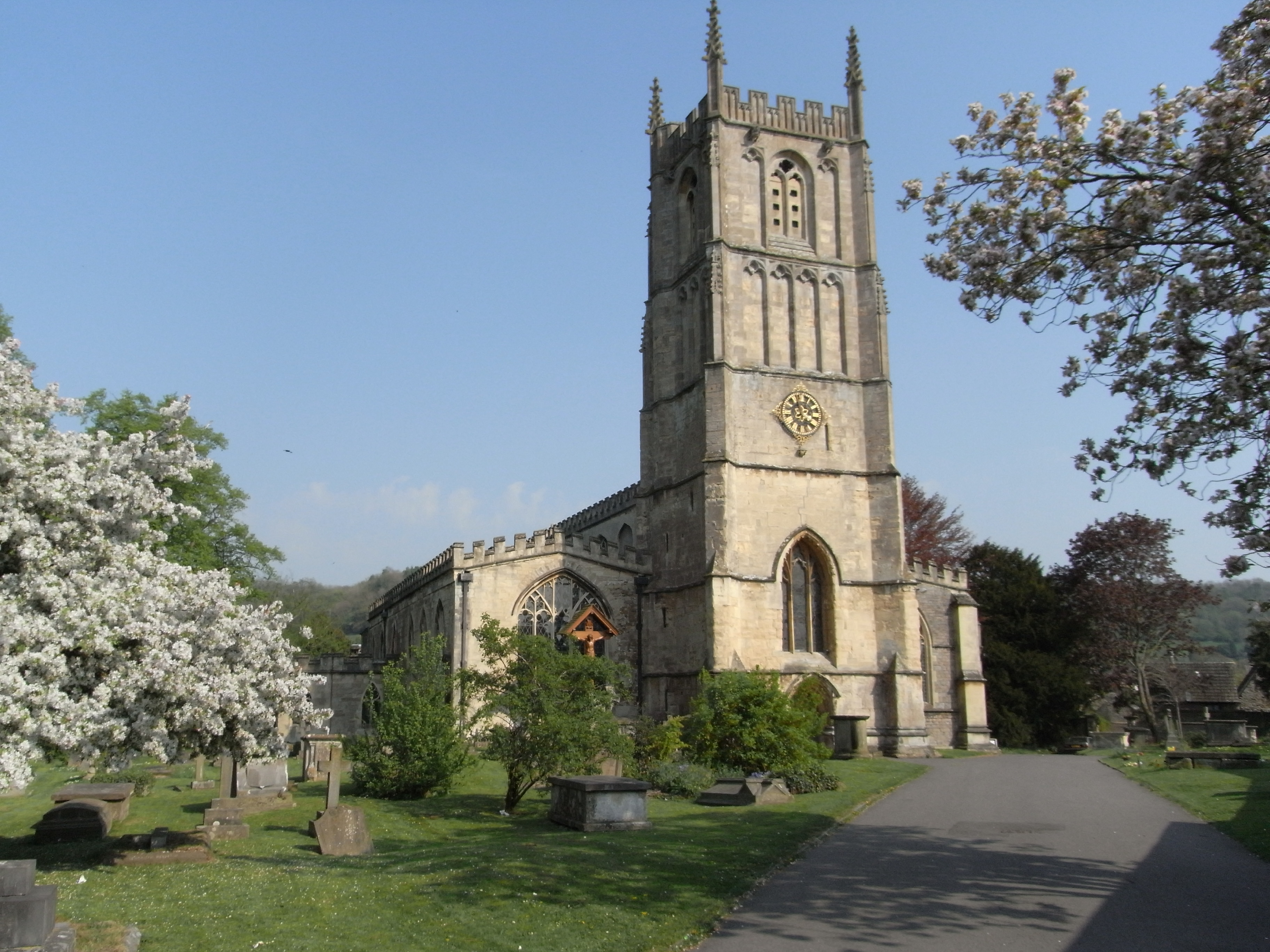
- St Mary the Virgin, Wotton-under-Edge
- St Mary the Virgin, Wotton-under-Edge
- 51°38′20.5″N 2°20′53″W
- Denomination: Church of England
- Churchmanship: Broad Church

History
- Dedication: St Mary

Administration
- Province: Canterbury
- Diocese: Gloucester
- Parish: Wotton-under-Edge

Clergy
- Vicar: Rev Lesley Hewish
- Priest: Revd Peter Marsh

St Mary the Virgin is the Church of England parish church of the town of Wotton-under-Edge in Gloucestershire. It is a Grade I listed building. St Mary's was consecrated on 19 August 1283 by Bishop of Worcester, Godfrey Giffard. It is believed that most of the church as it is today was completed in 1325, some 171 years after its first recorded vicar, Gerinus, in 1154. It is one of four churches in Wotton-under-Edge.

== Layout ==
=== Sacristy ===
The sacristy was built in the 1830s and contains charity boards that were originally from the galleries, located at the west end of the church. The sacristy contains clothing for the acolytes and minister, as well as other items used within the service.

=== Sanctuary ===
The roof over the sanctuary is all that remains of the 16th-century roof that covered the nave. The reredos (a more recent part of this church) is made from English oak in 14th-century style to blend in with the historic image of the rest of the church, in memory of Charlotte Sewell, mother of vicar Canon Sewell (1882–1902).

The East Window dates back to the completion of the church in 1325, depicting angels and saints in adoration of Christ.

=== Brasses ===
This is the area near the sacristy containing the tombs of Thomas de Berkeley, 5th Baron Berkeley and Lady Berkeley. Lord Berkeley was admiral of the King's Fleet and fought in the battle of Agincourt. The brasses over their tombs date from 1392 and are thus the second oldest in Gloucestershire.

=== Chancel and choir ===
The choir stalls were built into the church in 1885, the incredible chandelier that swings above was a gift from clothier William Moore, in 1763 - but is only lit at major events.

=== Catherine Chapel ===
The Catharine Chapel is located at the top of the north aisle. It is named after St Catherine, not to be confused with Lady Berkeley. The chapel was originally built in medieval times, possibly not long after the actual church. It was enlarged in 1780 to form a vestry and then restored as a chapel in 1928. It is now used for Friday morning prayer.

=== Tower ===
The church tower is located at the west of the church. It was built in six stages, the first two in c.1320, at the time of the church construction. The latter four were built slightly later but completed by the end of the 14th century. It stands 47 metres tall.

==== Clock ====
Built in 1902, the clock is about halfway up the west side of the tower, with a clock face measuring six feet in diameter. The hands and numbers are made from brass.

==== Bells ====
The church bells were cast in 1756 in Gloucester by Abel Rudhall. In 1902, during a renovation of the tower (including the clock), they were hung on steel frames, and then rehung again in 1960. They sound in the key of E-flat.

== Organ ==
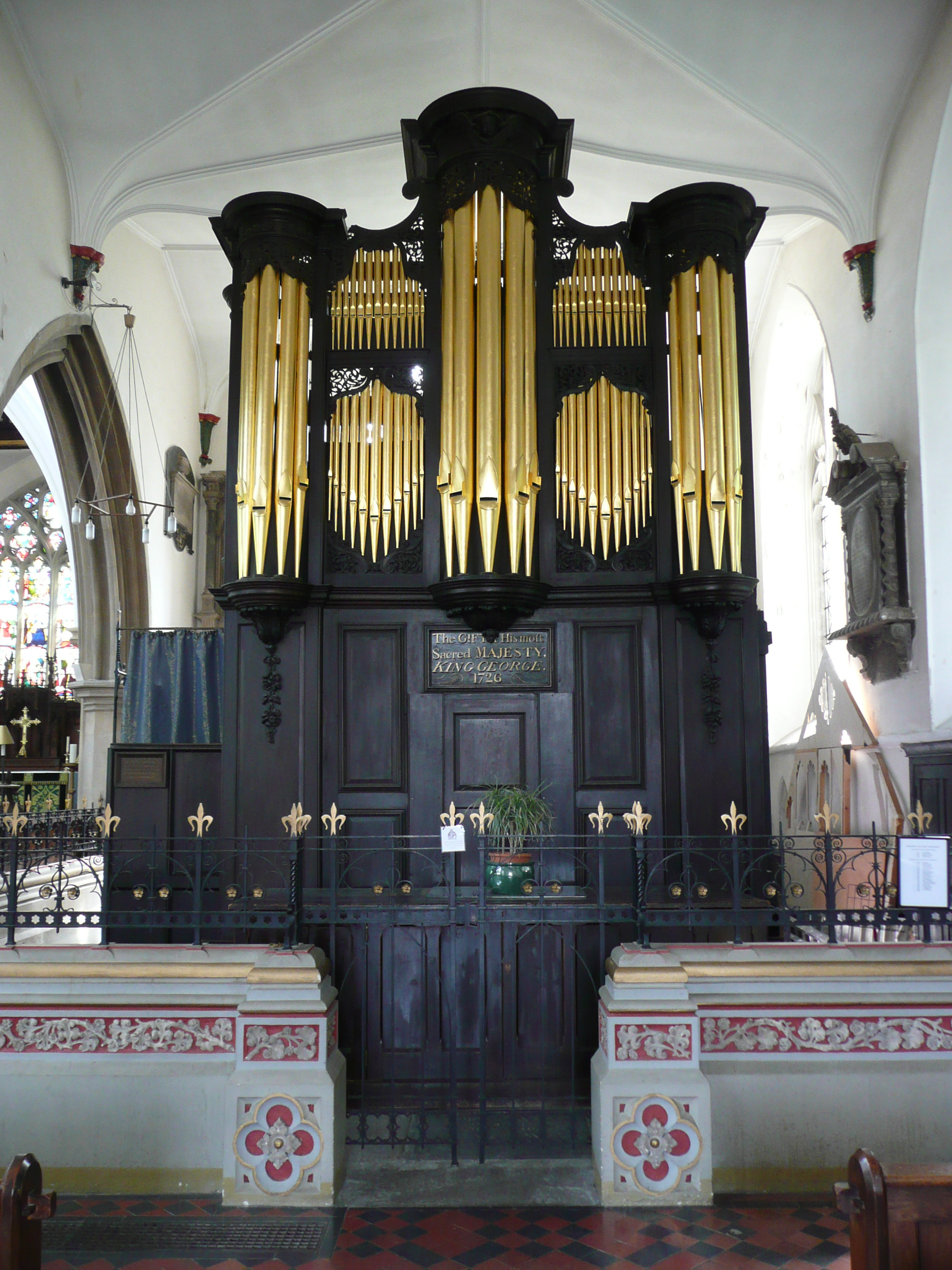
The famous organ that resides in the south-east of the church

The church is perhaps best known for its large organ of 1727 by Christopher Schreider. Positioned in the south-east corner of the church, adjacent to the altar; it is one of the biggest organs in the county and is famed for having been played by Georg Handel when in its previous location of St Martin-in-the-Fields. The organ was presented to St Martin-in-the-Fields by King George I. It possesses a large range of stops over three manuals and a pedalboard, including two trumpets, six diapasons, a cornopean, and a flute.

A specification of the organ can be found on the National Pipe Organ Register.
