= John Lisle, 1st Baron Lisle of Wootton =

English baron

Alleged arms of John I Lisle, Or, on a chief azure, three lions rampant or.

John I Lisle, 1st Baron Lisle of Wootton (died 1304), from Wootton in the Isle of Wight, was an English landowner, soldier and administrator who from 1299 to 1302 was summoned to Parliament as a baron.

== Origins ==
His family, whose name appears in French as de Lisle and in Latin as de Insula, had been landowners and administrators on the Isle of Wight, then part of Hampshire, since the time of his great-great-grandfather Jordan Lisle. Born about 1240, he was the son and heir of William Lisle, who died about 1252.

== Career ==
In 1267 he was governor of Carisbrooke Castle on the island but then spent many years fighting outside England, first in Wales in 1277 and again in 1282, when he was knighted, and then in France in 1295. There he was in the English garrison of Blaye on the Gironde, receiving a royal protection against tax on or seizure of his properties in England while serving abroad. By writs from 29 December 1299 to 13 September 1302 he was summoned to Parliament, so creating by later theory a hereditary barony.

He died before 10 June 1304, holding considerable lands on both the island and the mainland: the grange of Briddlesford, the manor and fishery of Wootton and seven other manors on the island, plus the manor of Mansbridge and La Rugge Hall, together with Woodhouse and part of the forest of Chute, as well as the rights of the hereditary bailiff of the east walk of Chute, which had been settled on him on his marriage. These properties were valued at 79 pounds a year, equivalent to about 80,000 pounds in 2022,

== Family ==
He married Nichola Columbiers, daughter of Michael Columbiers, of Chute, and their only known child was his heir John II Lisle.
