= Thomas Talbot, 2nd Viscount Lisle =

English Nobleman

- Born: c. 1449
- Died: 20 March 1470 (aged 20–21); North Nibley, Gloucestershire, England
- Spouse: Margaret Herbert
- Father: John Talbot
- Relatives: Margaret Beauchamp (grandmother); John Talbot (grandfather)

Thomas Talbot, 2nd Baron Lisle and 2nd Viscount Lisle (c. 1449 – 20 March 1470), English nobleman, was the son of John Talbot, 1st Viscount Lisle and Joan Cheddar.

He married Margaret Herbert, the daughter of William Herbert, 1st Earl of Pembroke. Upon the death of his grandmother, Margaret Beauchamp, in 1467, Lisle inherited her claims upon the lands of Baron Berkeley. He attempted to gain entrance to Berkeley Castle by bribery; but the plot was discovered, and in a fit of pique, he challenged Lord Berkeley to a trial of arms. The ensuing Battle of Nibley Green was the last battle on English soil fought entirely between private feudatories. The superior numbers of Berkeley won the day: Lisle's troops were routed, he was slain on the field by a James Hiatte, and Berkeley pillaged Lisle's manor of Wotton-under-Edge. Lady Lisle miscarried a son shortly thereafter; the Viscounty of Lisle became extinct, and the barony passed into abeyance between his two sisters.

== Sources ==
- "Chapter V : The Battle of Nibley Green", rotwang.co.uk. Accessed 31 December 2022.

Peerage of England
Preceded by John Talbot	Viscount Lisle; 1453–1470	Extinct
Preceded by John Talbot	Baron Lisle; 1453–1470	In abeyance Title next held by Elizabeth Talbot
