= Briddlesford Manor =

- Former names: Bridlesford
- Alternative names: Breilesford

General information
- Type: Manor house
- Location: Isle of Wight, United Kingdom

Briddlesford Manor (also Breilesford, Bridlesford, Britilsford), is a manor house on the Isle of Wight, situated in the parish of Arreton.

It lies in the low ground to the north of the down at the northern end of the parish. Before the Conquest it had been held by Unlof of King Edward, but in 1086 it was in the possession of William son of Azor (landowner), being in the tenancy of Nigel. The overlordship followed the same descent as Yaverland until 1331–2, and after that time the manor was held of the honour of Carisbrooke Castle.

The manor lapsed to the overlord Thomas de Aula in 1204 on account of the felony of William de Briddlesford, the tenant. It had evidently formerly belonged to the family of de Parco, for Walter de Parco granted land in the manor to the abbey of Quarr and Thomas de Aula confirmed to the abbey the land in Briddlesford which William de Parco had given. Towards the end of the 13th century it was held by the Lisles of Wootton, and it has since followed the same descent as Wootton. As of 1912 it was in the possession of Col. Stephenson Clarke.

In the reign of Elizabeth Thomas Lisle, second son of Thomas Lisle of Wootton, went to live at Briddlesford, and, Sir John Oglander says, built the house.
