= Margaret Mortimer, Baroness Berkeley =

English baroness (1304–1337)

Margaret Mortimer
- Baroness Berkeley
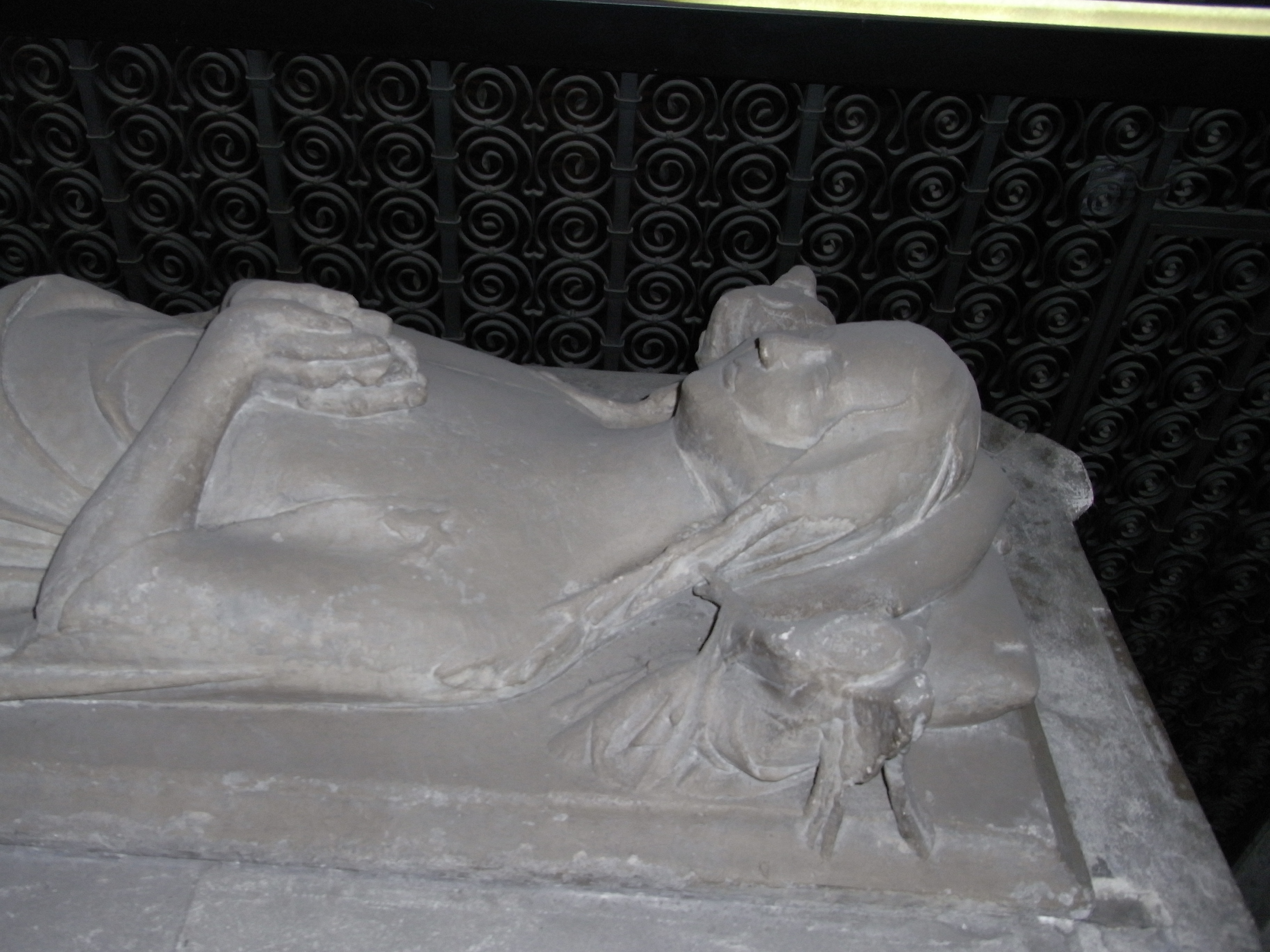
- Effigy of Margaret Mortimer at right hand of her son Maurice de Berkeley, 4th Baron Berkeley(d.1368), St Augustine's Abbey, Bristol
- Born: 2 May 1304
- Died: 5 May 1337 (age 33)
- Buried: St. Augustine's Abbey, Bristol.
- Spouse: Thomas de Berkeley, 3rd Baron Berkeley
- Issue: Maurice de Berkeley, 4th Baron Berkeley; Thomas de Berkeley; Roger de Berkeley; Alphonsus de Berkeley; Joan de Berkeley
- Father: Roger Mortimer, 1st Earl of March
- Mother: Joan de Geneville, Baroness Geneville

Margaret Mortimer, Baroness Berkeley (2 May 1304 – 5 May 1337) was the wife of Thomas de Berkeley, 3rd Baron Berkeley. She was the eldest daughter of Roger Mortimer, 1st Earl of March, the de facto ruler of England from 1327 to 1330, and his wife Joan de Geneville, Baroness Geneville.

== Family ==
Margaret Mortimer was the eldest of the twelve children of Roger Mortimer, 1st Earl of March and Joan de Geneville, Baroness Geneville. Her paternal grandparents were Edmund Mortimer, 2nd Baron Mortimer and Margaret de Fiennes. Her maternal grandparents were Piers de Geneville, of Trim Castle and Ludlow, and Jeanne of Lusignan.

== Marriage and death ==
Her father Roger proposed the marriage of his eldest daughter Margaret to Maurice de Berkeley, 2nd Baron Berkeley's son and heir Thomas. From Roger's point of view, the marriage was meant to secure an earlier alliance with an important lord of the Welsh Marshes. Margaret was duly married to Thomas de Berkeley (d. 1361) in May 1319. He succeeded his father as 3rd Baron Berkeley in 1326. The couple had three sons and one daughter who survived childhood. Their eldest son Maurice married Elizabeth le Despenser, despite the fact that it had been his grandfather Roger Mortimer that was largely responsible for the execution of Elizabeth's father Hugh le Despenser in 1326.

== Later life ==
After her father's fall from power in 1322, Margaret was arrested. In 1324, she was sent to Shouldham Priory. Her marriage to Berkeley was confirmed, and her offspring declared legitimate by Pope John XXII in 1329.

Margaret died on 5 May 1337. She was buried at St. Augustine's Abbey, Bristol, Gloucestershire. After her death, her husband married again to Catherine born Clivedon.

== Ancestry ==
Ancestors of Margaret Mortimer, Baroness Berkeley

Ralph de Mortimer
Roger Mortimer, 1st Baron Mortimer
Gladys the Dark
Edmund Mortimer, 2nd Baron Wigmore
William de Braose
Maud de Braose
Eva Marshal
Roger Mortimer, 1st Earl of March
Infelram de Fiennes
William de Fiennes
Isabelle Conde
Margaret de Fiennes
Jean de Brienne, Grand Butler of France
Blanche de Brienne
Jeanne, Dame de Chateaudun
Margaret Mortimer
Simon of Joinville
Geoffrey de Geneville, 1st Baron Geneville
Beatrix of Auxonne
Peter de Geneville
Gilbert de Lacy, of Ewyas Lacy
Maud de Lacy
Isabel Bigod
Joan de Geneville, 2nd Baroness Geneville
Hugh XI of Lusignan, Count of La Marche
Hugh XIII, Count of La Marche
Yolande de Dreux, Countess of Penthièvre and of Porhoet
Joan of Lusignan
Raoul III, Sire de Fougères
Jeanne de Fougères
Isabelle de Craon
