= Joan Greyndour =

English noblewoman

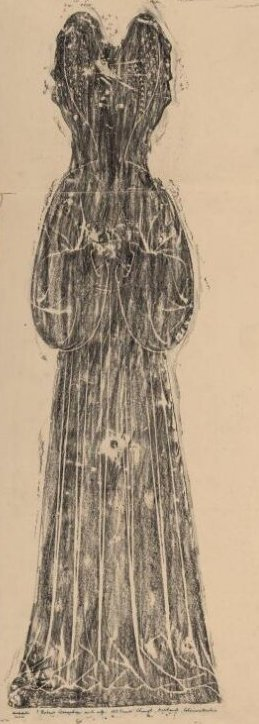
- brass rubbing of her image
- Born: c. 1400; Charlcombe
- Died: 17 June 1485; Newland
- Occupation: philanthropist
- Spouse(s): 1. Robert Greyndour; 2. Sir John Barre
- Children: Elizabeth Greyndour

Joan Greyndour later Joan Barre (née Rigge/Ridge/Rugge (c. 1400 – 17 June 1485) was an English noblewoman. She founded a chantry and school at Newland in Gloucestershire.

== Life ==
She was born at Charlcombe in about 1400 and her parents were Katherine (born Bitton) and Thomas Rigge (or Ridge or Rugge) of Chicklade in Wiltshire. Her parents were wealthy, controlling lands near Bristol and Bath.

By 1419, she was married to Robert Greyndour. They had one child, Elizabeth, in 1421.

She founded a chantry and a grammar school at Newland in Gloucestershire after her husband died. Henry VI had founded Eton College in 1440 linking a chantry to a school and Greyndour was an early example of a similar establishment. Katherine Berkeley, Lady Margaret Beaufort and Greyndour were all early examples of women founding schools.

She obtained a Royal license for the school in 1445 and in the following year she deposited the statutes of the school with the local diocesan. The master of the school, John Clifford, taught the boys grammar and they paid to join the school.

Her daughter, Elizabeth, died in 1452 in childbirth. She had married well initially to Reynold West, sixth Baron de la Warr and when he died in 1450, she remarried to John Tiptoft, 1st Earl of Worcester. Their son, John, did not survive long.

Greyndour remarried Sir John Barre and this was a convenient marriage with advantages for both of them. Notably, Sir John Barre was buried with his first wife when he died in 1483.

== Death and legacy ==
Greyndour died in Newland in 1485. She had written a detailed will which divided up her wealth. The school that she had founded continued until the 1540s when it was closed as a result of the 1547 Chantry act.

In 1577, the school was reestablished. There are brasses in the church where she was buried which are probably her, her husband and their coat of arms. The school that she founded has a history that ended in the 1960s and it became part of the Royal Forest of Dean College.
