= Katharine Lady Berkeley's School =

School in Wotton-under-Edge, Gloucestershire, England

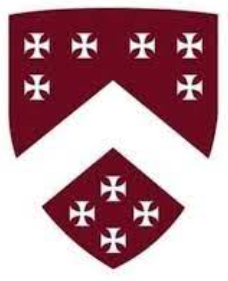

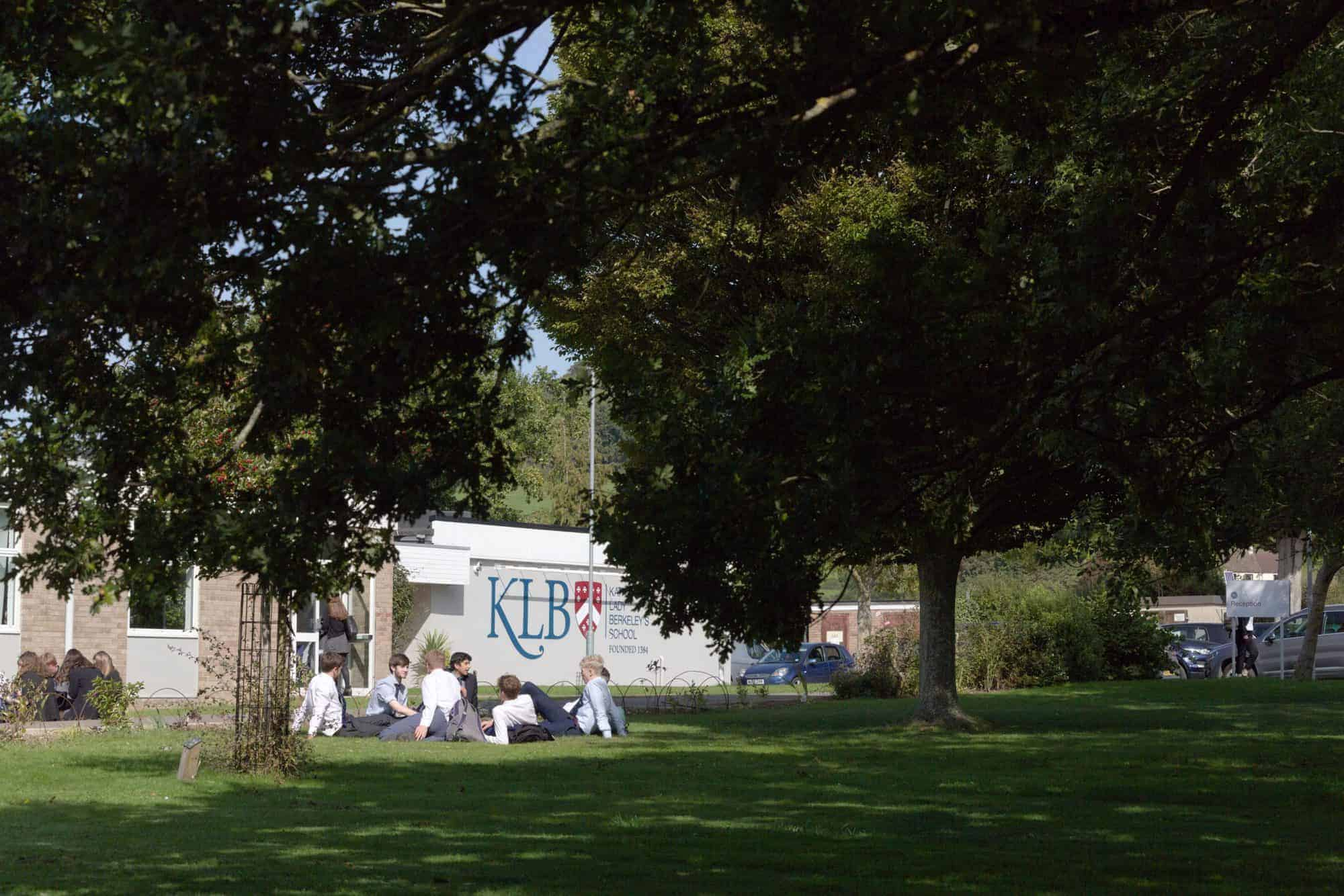

Location
- Wotton Road; Wotton-under-Edge, Gloucestershire, GL12 8RB; England
- Coordinates: 51°37′54″N 2°21′51″W

Information
- Type: State school (comprehensive); Academy
- Motto: non palma sine pulvere (no reward without effort)
- Religious affiliation: Mixed
- Established: 1384; 642 years ago
- Founder: Katharine, Lady Berkeley
- Department for Education URN: 137033 Tables
- Ofsted: Reports
- Headteacher: Hannah Khan
- Gender: Coeducational
- Age: 11 to 18
- Enrolment: 1,470
- Houses: Wellicome (Red), Berkeley (Green), Durand (Blue), Logan (Yellow)
- Colours: Maroon, Blue, Yellow
- Publication: The Berkeleyan
- Alumni: Old Berkeleyans (OBs)
- Website: http://www.klbschool.org.uk

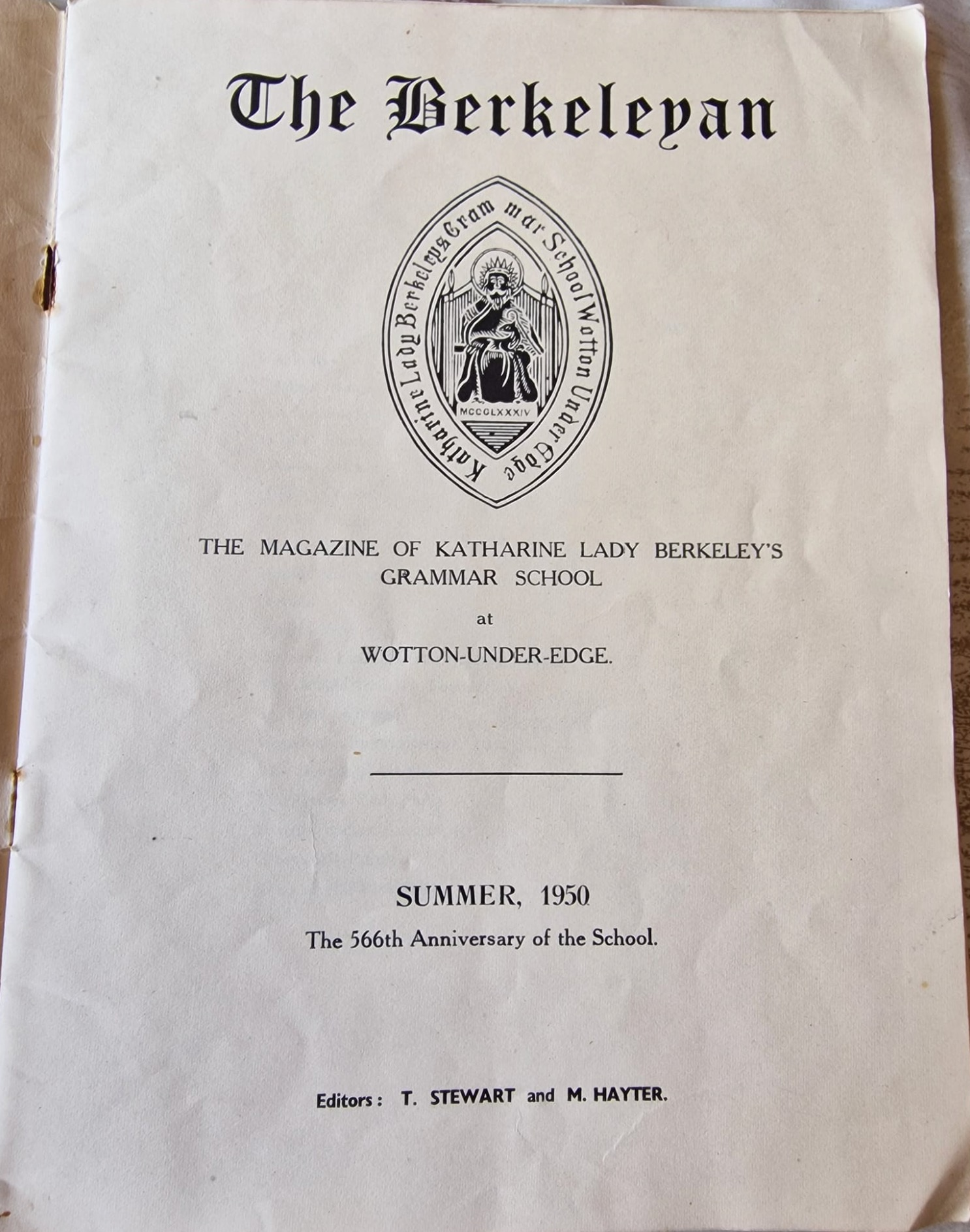
The Berkeleyan - Summer 1950 Edition

Katharine Lady Berkeley's School is an academy school near Wotton-under-Edge, Gloucestershire, England, for ages 11 to 18. It has been ranked as the 4th best non-fee paying school in the South-West and 250th best in the whole country.

== History ==
The school was founded by Katherine, Lady Berkeley for the use of six scholars in 1384 which makes it one of the oldest surviving schools in England. It is known that schools existed in the area before then, but Lady Berkeley formalised this school, gaining it a royal licence and it became a model for other schools. It was founded before Eton, Harrow, and Westminster, and two years after Winchester. The first headteacher appointed in 1384 was John Stone M.A. (Oxon).

The old school buildings in School Lane, Wotton-under-Edge, were erected in 1726 with additions later. Shortly after the school had become co-educational, Church Mill was bought in 1908. After the First World War, Carlton House was rented from the Post Office.

The original foundation deed of the school reads:

"We the said Kitherina (Katherine), attentively considering that the purposes of man desiring to be informed in grammar which is the foundation of all liberal arts, is daily defeated and frustrated by poverty and want of means; therefore for the maintenance and exaltation of Holy Mother Church, and the increase of divine worship, and other liberal arts and sciences, out of the goods bestowed on us by God have procured the said Walter and Williams to acquire certain lands and tenements in fee, that they may build a school-house in Wotton for the habitation and likewise dispose of them for the maintenance of a master and 2 poor scholars of the art of grammar; which master and his successors shall govern and inform all scholars coming to the same house or school coming for instruction in this art without taking anything for his trouble from them or any of them."

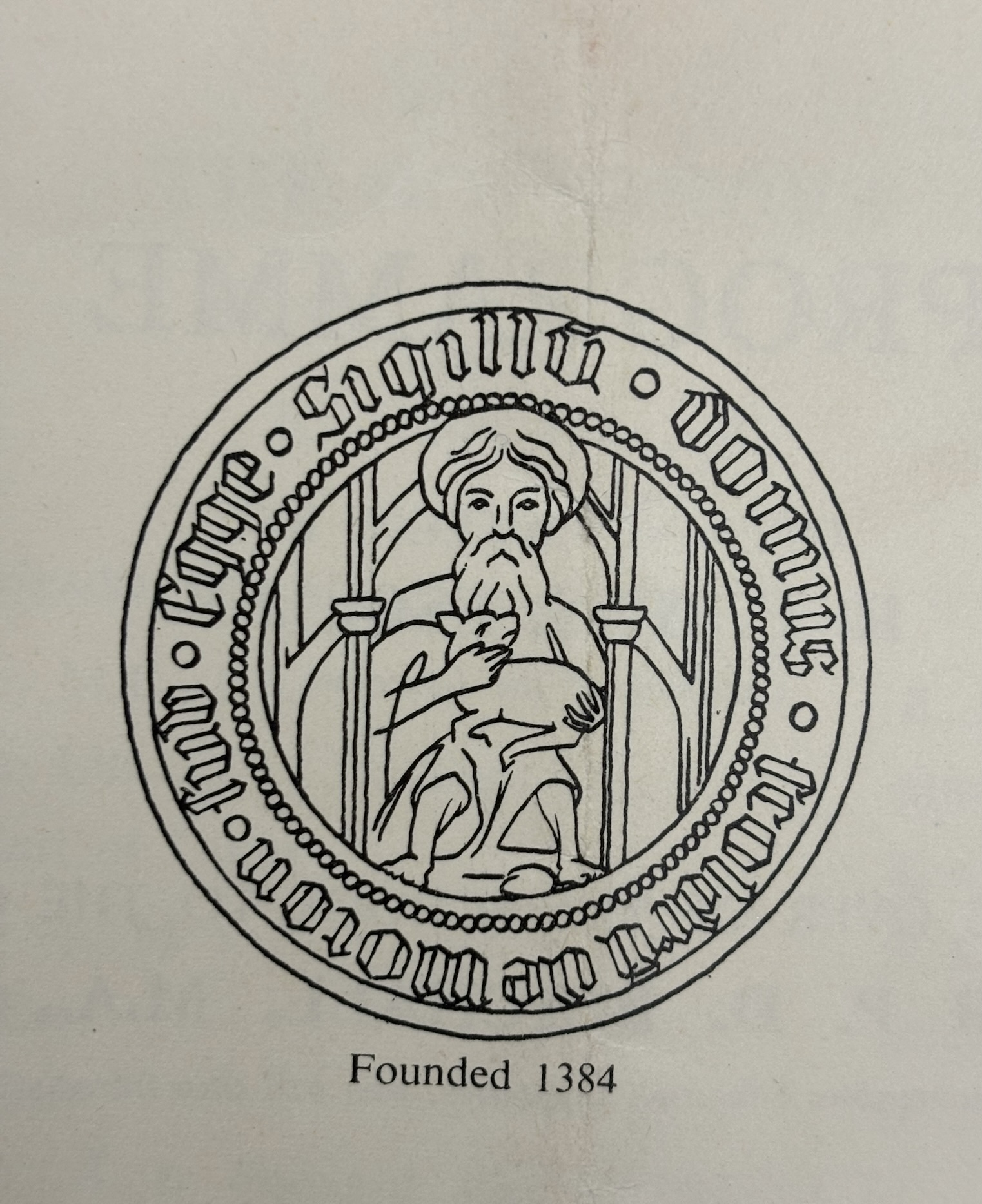
The Seal of Katharine Lady Berkeley's School

The deed was sealed with Lady Katharine's personal seal showing St. John holding a lamb with the Latin inscription "Sigilla domus scolaru de Woton sub egge" meaning "the seal of the school house of Wotton-under-Edge". This is the seal stamped on all prizes, Head Boy, and Head Girl badges as well as on the cover of the alumni (and school) magazine, The Berkeleyan (pictured below). The crest carried on the blazers is the Berkeley coat of arms.

=== New buildings ===
In January 1963, the school vacated the premises in Wotton and moved into a new building for 350 pupils in the Kingswood Road. The erection of the first phase of extensions to the Kingswood Road buildings began in March 1972. The extensions were completed for the start of the Autumn Term 1973, when Katharine Lady Berkeley's re-opened as a comprehensive school for 830 pupils. Wotton Secondary School closed at the end of August 1973.

In 1984 the six hundredth anniversary of the foundation of the school was celebrated with a visit from Princess Anne. In 1989, the Duke of Gloucester opened the Renishaw Centre, an IT room costing £60,000 and since then the School has installed three more computer rooms. The Renishaw Company renewed the equipment in the Renishaw Centre.

In 1992, grant-maintained (GM) status was attained, with the object of providing for the structural improvement of the buildings and a wish to be able to make independent decisions to suit the school's future. In 1996, the school achieved designation as a Language College. This enabled the school to offer a languages curriculum covering seven modern languages and Latin.

In 1994, accommodation was added to allow for the increase in numbers, from 1,010 in 1984 to 1,170 in 1994 and then to 1,340 in 1998. Further new buildings were completed in September 1997 to provide six more classrooms and the Language Centre costing £220,000 was opened in September 1996. In autumn 1999, work began on further new buildings to provide a new two storey teaching block that includes 11 classrooms, three ICT suites and a new library. In addition to this, a three-laboratory extension was added to the Science Centre. In 2007, the school gained a second DfES specialism, that of training school. The school population has stabilized at around 1500 pupils. In September 2011, the school became an academy. Since then the Science block has had 8 of its 11 rooms completely remade and several new classrooms have been added. In 2021 the school won a bid for an extensive rebuild with the designs finalised in early 2022.

== Notable former pupils ==
- William Tyndale, scholar
- Edward Jenner, physician and scientist
- Mathew Blagden Hale, Anglican bishop
- Adjoa Andoh, actor
- Catherine Johnson, playwright
- Simon Mason, England hockey goalkeeper
- Sean Rigg, professional footballer
- Ben Morgan, England rugby union player
- Joyce Rimmer, social worker and campaigner
- Ginette Harrison, mountaineer

== Head Teachers ==
| Number | Headteacher | Date |
|---|---|---|
| 1 | John Stone | 1384 |
| 2 | William Hasleton | 1405 |
| 3 | John Seymour | 1407 |
| 4 | John James | 1410 |
| 5 | William Clyfton | 1415 |
| 6 | Thomas Joye | 1423 |
| 7 | John Paradys | 1427 |
| 8 | Walter Frouceter | 1456 |
| 10 | Robin Hanys | 1460 |
| 11 | John Dale | 1461 |
| 12 | John Town | 1462 |
| 13 | Richard West | 1465 |
| 14 | John Parker | 1487 |
| 15 | John Chilcote | 1493 |
| 16 | Robert Coldwell | 1511 |
| 17 | Robert Knight | 1554 |
| 18 | John DuPont | 1578 |
| 19 | Edward Cowper | 1609 |
| 20 | John Turner | 1632 |
| 21 | Joseph Woodward | 1640 |
| 22 | Thomas Byrton | 1647 |
| 23 | Edward Spence | 1698 |
| 24 | Andrew Skene | 1703 |
| 25 | Samuel Bennett | 1706 |
| 26 | Samuel Hayward | 1743 |
| 27 | Thomas Clissold | 1748 |
| 28 | Peter Cornwall | 1788 |
| 29 | Joseph Barkett | 1829 |
| 30 | Benjamin Perkins | 1839 |
| 31 | John Cranstoun | 1882 |
| 32 | Frederick Morris | 1886 |
| 33 | R B Harding | 1908 |
| 34 | Ernest Wells | 1909 |
| 35 | Richard Dobson | 1912 |
| 36 | George Morton | 1915 |
| 37 | Clement Trenchard | 1920 |
| 38 | Cyril Fiske | 1924 |
| 39 | Frederick Hornsby | 1952 |
| 40 | John Foster | 1960 |
| 41 | John Lee | 1968 |
| 42 | John Law | 1982 |
| 43 | Andrew Harris | 1998 |
| 44 | Tim Rand | 2019 |
| 45 | Hannah Khan | 2023 |

== See also ==
- List of the oldest schools in the United Kingdom
