= Elizabeth Grey, 5th Baroness Lisle =

English noblewoman

Elizabeth Grey

5th Baroness Lisle
- Predecessor: John Grey, 2nd Viscount Lisle
- Successor: Elizabeth Grey, 6th Baroness Lisle
- Born: 25 March 1505
- Died: 1519 (aged 13–14)
- Spouse: Henry Courtenay, 1st Marquess of Exeter
- Father: John Grey, 2nd Viscount Lisle
- Mother: Lady Muriel Howard

Elizabeth Grey, 5th Baroness Lisle (25 March 1505 – 1519) was an English noblewoman and heiress.

== Life ==
Elizabeth was the daughter of John Grey, 2nd Viscount Lisle and Lady Muriel Howard. The death of her father in 1504 meant that she was born a considerable heiress and ward of the Crown. In 1509 her grandfather, Thomas Howard, 2nd Duke of Norfolk, obtained a lease of her lands from the king. After the death of her stepfather Sir Thomas Knyvet in August 1512 and of her mother a few months later, Elizabeth's wardship was purchased by Sir Charles Brandon, a favourite of Henry VIII. Betrothal to his eight-year-old ward facilitated Brandon's elevation to the peerage as Viscount Lisle in May 1513.

In 1515, Brandon married Mary Tudor, the Queen Dowager of France and Henry VIII's younger sister (without having obtained the consent of the King). Having no need of Elizabeth as a potential bride himself, Brandon sold her wardship to Katherine Plantagenet, Countess of Devon for £4,000. The Countess married Elizabeth to her son Henry Courtenay, a cousin of the King and grandson of Edward IV of England, but as she died aged fourteen it is unlikely the marriage was consummated. After her death the Lisle title passed to Arthur Plantagenet, the husband of Elizabeth Grey, 6th Baroness Lisle, Elizabeth's aunt.
