= Katherine, Lady Berkeley =

14th century noblewoman

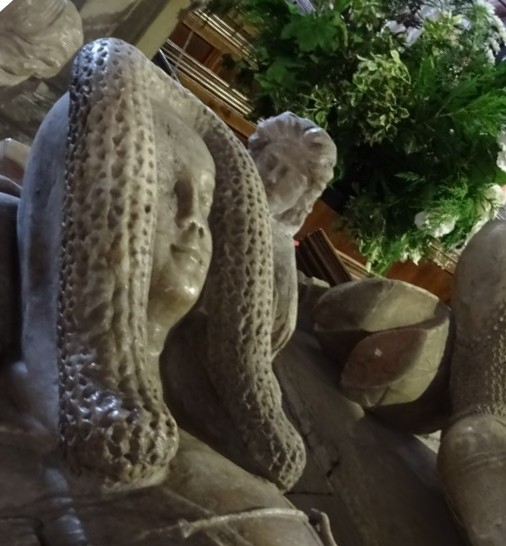
- detail from her effigy
- Known for: founding Katharine Lady Berkeley's School
- Born: Katherine de Clevedon
- Died: 13 March 1385
- Spouses: 1. Sir Peter Veel; 2. Thomas de Berkeley, 3rd Baron Berkeley
- Issue: 1. Peter le Veel - Joan (wife of Sir Henry Moigne of Owermoigne), John, Thomas Veel; 2. Thomas de Berkeley - John, Maurice, Edmund de Berkeley
- Father: Sir John de Clevedon of Somerset and Worcestershire
- Mother: Emma of Somerset and Worcestershire
- Occupation: Philanthropist

Katherine Berkeley, Lady Berkeley (Note: Also spelled Katharine or Catherine) (born Katherine de Clevedon; 1300s – 13 March 1385) was an English benefactor and school founder in Gloucestershire. In 1384 she obtained a royal licence for a chantry school that today is called the Katharine Lady Berkeley's School. The school is said to be the first founded by a lay person, the first founded by a woman and the first to offer free education to anyone.

== Life ==
Her place and date of birth are unknown, but her parents were Emma and Sir John de Clevedon of Somerset and Worcestershire. She grew up at Clevedon Court, her family's estate in North Somerset. She first married Sir Peter Veel of Charfield and Tortworth. She was his second wife.

After her first husband died, she remarried to Thomas de Berkeley, 3rd Baron Berkeley, whose family seat was Berkeley Castle. When they married, she owned lands spread across the Welsh borders, Wiltshire, Gloucestershire and in Devon. She owned lands in her own right, and would have been skilled in writing both English and French.

Her husband had been acquitted after being accused of involvement in the murder of Edward II. They had four children, but only one survived, Sir John Berkeley. Her second husband died in 1361, after which she took to philanthropy. She lived at the manor house in Wotton-under-Edge.

She founded a school for the use of six scholars in 1384, which makes it one of the oldest surviving schools in England. It is known that schools existed in the area before then, but Lady Berkeley formalised this school, gaining it a royal licence, and it became a model for other schools. The first headteacher was John Stone M.A. and as a priest, he also held mass every day. Lady Berkeley is credited with introducing the idea of a chantry school.

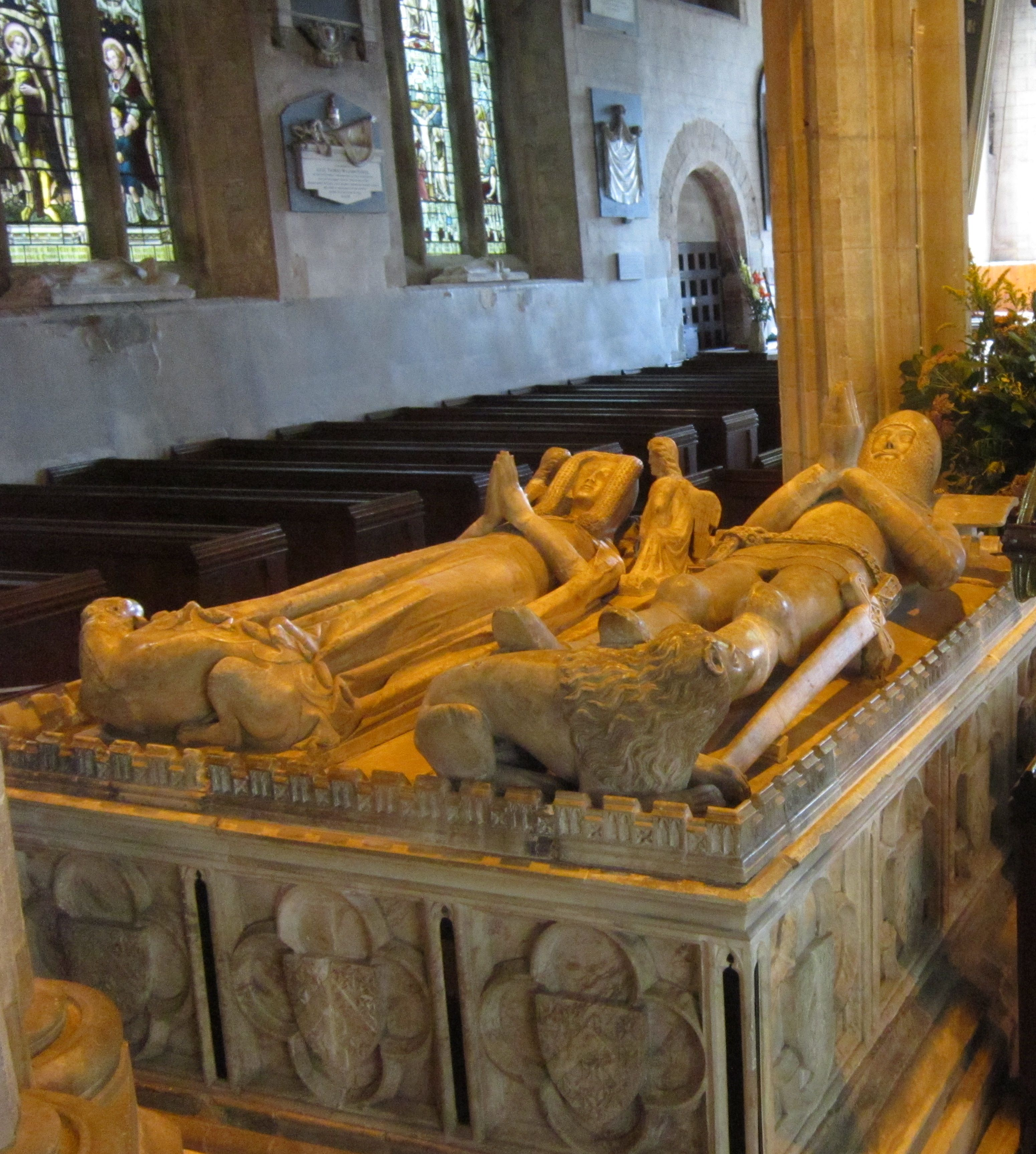
Lord Thomas and Lady Katherine Berkeley's tomb

To all the sons of the holy mother church, I, Katherine, who was the wife of Lord Thomas de Berkeley, late Lord of Berkeley, and we, Walter Burnell; chaplain, and William Pendock; chaplain, send greeting in Him who is the true health of all men, considering diligently and attentively that the intention of many persons desirous of being instructed in grammar, which is the foundation of all the liberal arts, ... to purchase certain lands and tenements, underwritten to them and to their heirs in fee, that they may build anew a certain schoolhouse in WOTTON UNDEREGGE for ... the support of one master and two poor scholars of the art of grammar; which said master and his successors shall govern and instruct all the scholars coming to the said house or school for the learning of this art, without taking anything for their trouble from them or any of them.

She wanted to create more scholars skilled in Latin, as many of them had been lost in the Black Death. This English grammar school was said to be the first founded by a layperson, the first founded by a woman, and the first to offer free education to anyone.

She devoted time to philanthropy, and travelled abroad on pilgrimages.

Katherine Berkeley died in 1385. Effigies of Lady Berkeley and her husband can be seen on their tomb at Berkeley church in Gloucestershire. Later examples of chantry schools included Henry VI's Eton College, founded in 1440, and Joan Greyndour's school at Newland.
