= Thomas de Berkeley, 3rd Baron Berkeley =

English peer

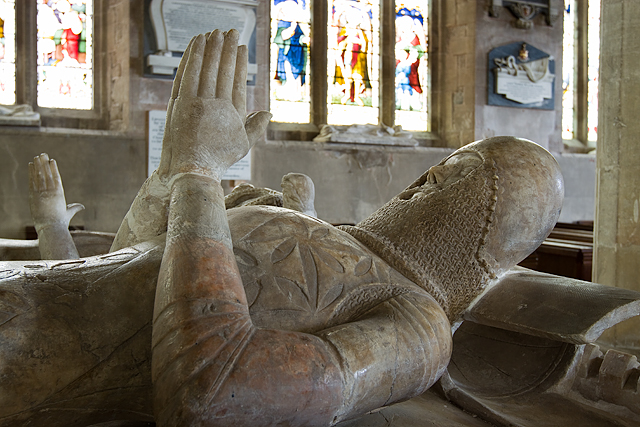
- Born: 1293 or 1296
- Died: 27 October 1361; Gloucestershire
- Predecessor: Maurice de Berkeley, 2nd Baron Berkeley
- Successor: Maurice de Berkeley, 4th Baron Berkeley
- Spouse(s): 1. Margaret Mortimer; 2. Katherine, Lady Berkeley (aka Clivedon)
- Children: 9
- Parent(s): Maurice de Berkeley, 2nd Baron Berkeley and Eva la Zouche

Thomas de Berkeley (c. 1293 or 1296 – 27 October 1361), known as The Rich, feudal baron of Berkeley, of Berkeley Castle in Gloucestershire, England, was a peer. His epithet, and that of each previous and subsequent head of his family, was coined by John Smyth of Nibley (d. 1641), steward of the Berkeley estates, the biographer of the family and author of Lives of the Berkeleys.

== Origins ==
He was the eldest son and heir of Maurice de Berkeley, 2nd Baron Berkeley by his wife, Eva la Zouche.

== Career ==
He was imprisoned with his father and younger brother Maurice, following the failure of the baronial revolt against Edward II. He was released in late 1326, probably due to the influence of his father-in-law Roger Mortimer. In April 1327 he was made joint custodian with his brother-in-law Sir John Maltravers of the deposed King Edward II, whom they took custody of at Kenilworth Castle and transferred to Berkeley Castle. According to his own account at his trial in 1330, he was later commanded to relinquish control of Berkeley Castle to Maltravers and Sir Thomas Gournay. Leaving the king there with heavy cheere perceiving what violence was intended, he went to stay at his manor of Bradley. The king was almost certainly murdered at Berkeley Castle during his absence. Although modern historians have accepted Smyth's doubts about this version of events, it is possible that it was the truth. Despite his acquittal Berkeley spent the following decade under a cloud, before being restored to royal favour in the 1340s.

== Marriages and children ==
Arms of Berkeley ("Cornerwise"): Gules, a chevron between ten crosses pattée six in chief and four in base argent

He married twice:

- Margaret (d. 5 May 1337), daughter of Roger Mortimer, 1st Earl of March and Joan de Geneville in May 1319:
  - Maurice de Berkeley, 4th Baron Berkeley (c. 1320 - 8 June 1368)
  - Thomas de Berkeley (d. 1349)
  - Roger de Berkeley (d. 1336)
  - Joan de Berkeley (d. 1369) married 1) Thomas de Haudlo (a great grandson of the 7th Earl of Arundel) and 2) Reginald de Cobham, 1st Baron Cobham.
  - Alphonse, who is included in some sources as a son, was probably a nephew
- Katherine (d. 1385), daughter of Sir John Clevedon and widow of Sir Peter Veel in June 1347:
  - Thomas, Maurice and Edmund all died as infants
  - John Berkeley (1352 – 1428) of Beverston Castle, Gloucestershire, a secondary residence of his father's.

His daughter Margaret de Berkeley (d. before 1362) married before 27 October 1358 as first wife of John de la Pole. Her dowry was settled on him prior to her death, and subsequently those manors and estates were bequeathed by John to Joan de la Pole, suo jure 4th Baroness Cobham, his only child from his second marriage.

== Death and succession ==
He died on 27 October 1361 and was buried at Berkeley alongside his second wife.

Peerage of England
Preceded by Maurice de Berkeley	Baron Berkeley; 1326–1361	Succeeded by Maurice de Berkeley
