= Maurice de Berkeley, 4th Baron Berkeley =

English peer

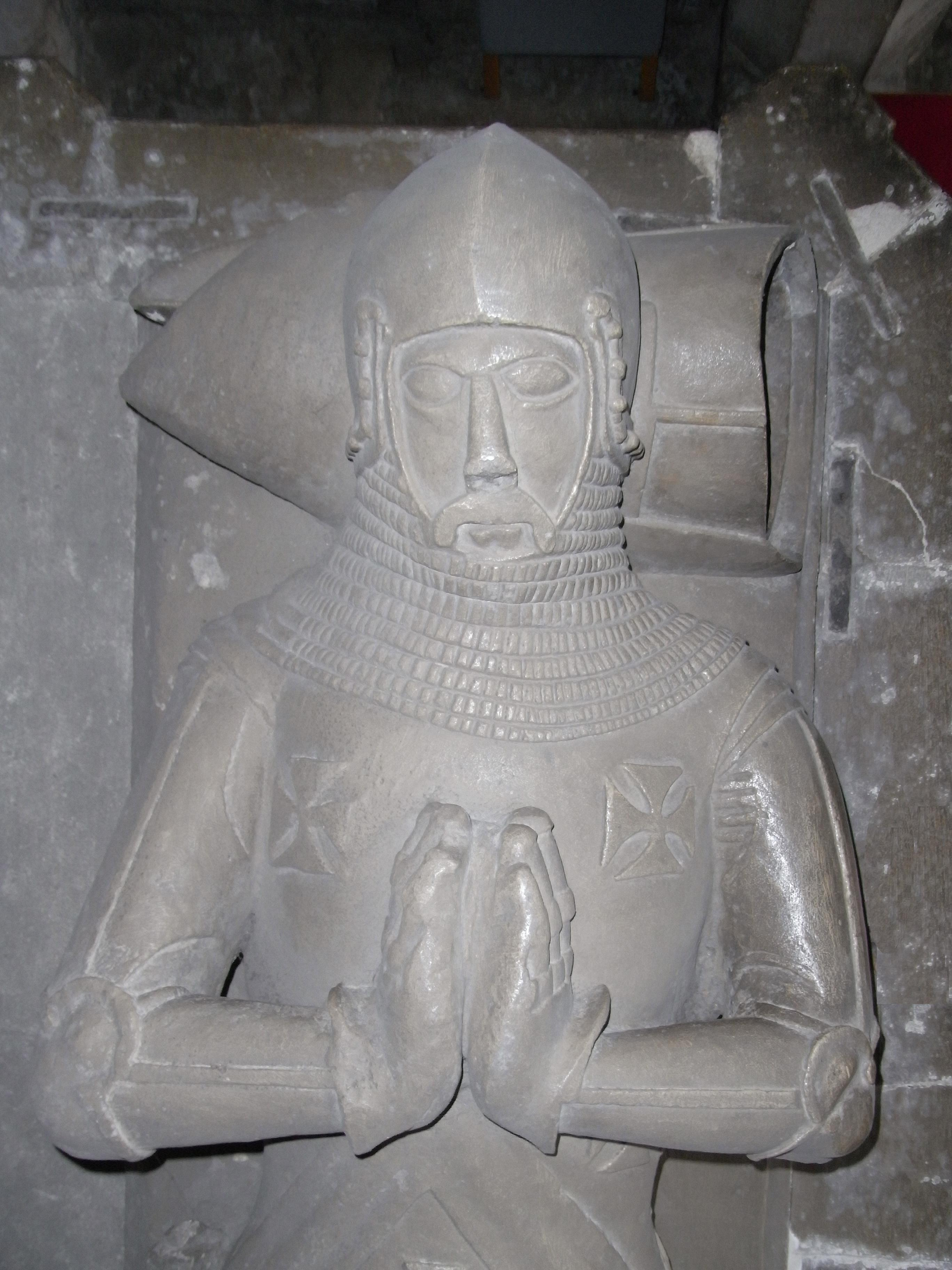
Restored effigy of Maurice de Berkeley, 4th Baron Berkeley, "The Valiant", in St Augustine's Abbey (now Bristol Cathedral), founded by his ancestor. Adjacent at his right hand is the effigy of his mother Margaret Mortimer(died 1337). The arms of Berkeley are shown on his tunic. His head rests on his helm atop which is visible the crest of Berkeley a bishop's mitre

Arms of Berkeley: Gules, a chevron between ten crosses pattée six in chief and four in base argent

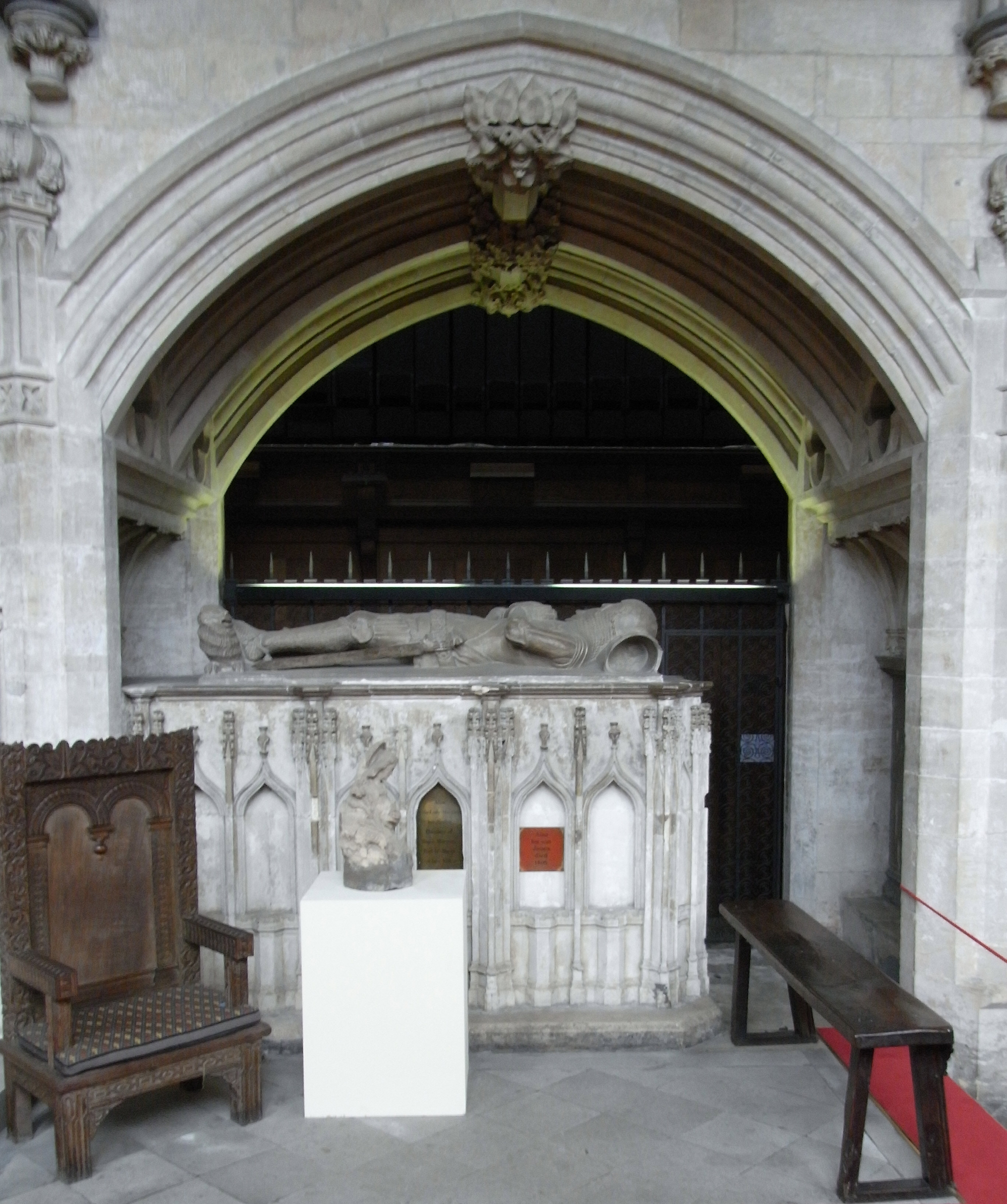
Chest tomb supporting restored effigies of Maurice Berkeley, Baron Berkeley(died 1368) "The Valiant", and his mother Margaret Mortimer(died 1337), St Augustine's Abbey (Bristol Cathedral), Lady Chapel, south wall

Maurice de Berkeley, 4th Baron Berkeley (c. 1320 – 8 June 1368), The Valiant, feudal baron of Berkeley, of Berkeley Castle in Gloucestershire, was an English peer. His epithet, and that of each previous and subsequent head of his family, was coined by John Smyth of Nibley (died 1641), steward of the Berkeley estates, the biographer of the family and author of "Lives of the Berkeleys".

== Career ==
He was the eldest son and heir of Thomas de Berkeley, 3rd Baron Berkeley by his wife Lady Margaret Mortimer.

In the early 1340s he was one of the English knights who joined the forces of Alfonso XI of Castile in his crusade against the Moorish kingdom of Algeciras. He was subsequently retained by the Black Prince and in 1355 joined his campaign in France. Wounded and captured at Poitiers, it took him over three years to raise the money for his ransom. Ill health apparently prevented his taking an active role in public life, following his return to England.

== Marriage and children ==
In August 1338 Berkeley married Elizabeth le Despenser, daughter of Hugh Despenser the younger by his wife Eleanor de Clare. By Elizabeth he had four sons and three daughters:

- Thomas de Berkeley, 5th Baron Berkeley
- Sir James de Berkeley (d. 13 June 1405) married Elizabeth Bluet; one of their sons was James Berkeley, 1st Baron Berkeley
- John de Berkeley died on campaign in France in the reign of Richard II
- Maurice de Berkeley married Jone Hereford
- Catherine became a nun at Wherwell Abbey in Hampshire
- Agnes died unmarried
- Elizabeth died unmarried

== Ancestry ==
Ancestors of Maurice de Berkeley, 4th Baron Berkeley

16. Sir Maurice de Berkeley
8. Thomas de Berkeley, 1st Baron Berkeley
17. Isabel FitzRoy
4. Maurice de Berkeley, 2nd Baron Berkeley
18. William de Ferrers, 5th Earl of Derby
9. Joan de Ferrers
19. Margaret de Quinci
2. Thomas de Berkeley, 3rd Baron Berkeley
20. Roger la Zouche
10. Eon la Zouche
5. Eve la Zouche
22.William de Cantilupe (died 1254)
11. Millicent de Cauntelo
23.Eva de Braose
1. Maurice de Berkeley, 4th Baron Berkeley
24. Roger Mortimer, 1st Baron Mortimer
12. Edmund Mortimer, 2nd Baron Wigmore
25. Maud de Braose
6. Roger Mortimer, 1st Earl of March
26. William de Fiennes, Baron of Tingry and Fiennes
13. Margaret de Fiennes
27. Blanche de Brienne
3. Margaret Mortimer
28. Geoffrey de Geneville, 1st Baron Geneville
14. Sir Piers de Geneville
29. Maud de Lacy
7. Joan de Geneville, Baroness Geneville
30. Hugh XII of Lusignan
15. Jeanne of Lusignan
31. Jeanne de Fougères

== Sources ==
- Richardson, Douglas, Kimball G. Everingham, and David Faris. Plantagenet Ancestry: A Study in Colonial and Medieval Families. Royal ancestry series. (p. 99) Baltimore, Md: Genealogical Pub. Co, 2004. Retrieved April 21, 2008

Peerage of England
Preceded by Thomas de Berkeley	Baron Berkeley; 1361–1368	Succeeded by Thomas de Berkeley
