= Elizabeth le Despenser, Baroness Berkeley =

English noblewoman

Elizabeth le Despenser
- Baroness Berkeley
- Born: 1327; Tower of London, London, England
- Died: 13 July 1389 (aged 61–62)
- Buried: St Botolph's Aldgate, London, England
- Spouses: Maurice de Berkeley, 4th Baron Berkeley; Sir Maurice Wyth
- Issue: Thomas de Berkeley, 5th Lord Berkeley; James de Berkeley; John de Berkeley; Maurice de Berkeley; Catherine de Berkeley; Agnes de Berkeley; Elizabeth de Berkeley
- Father: Hugh Despenser the Younger
- Mother: Eleanor de Clare

Elizabeth le Despenser (c. 1327 – 13 July 1389) was an English noblewoman. She was the youngest daughter of Hugh le Despenser the younger and his wife Eleanor de Clare. Her father is famous for being the favourite of Edward II of England; he was executed as a result of his position and actions. Through her mother, Elizabeth was a great-granddaughter of King Edward I of England.

== Early life ==
The exact date of her birth is disputed; it is possible that she (or her brother John) was born in December 1325. She may have been born to her mother sometime after her father's death, as she was not forced to take the veil like three of her older sisters. Not much else is known about her youth until August 1338, when she was sent to the care of her maternal aunt Elizabeth de Clare after her mother Eleanor's death the previous year.

== Marriage and later life ==
In August 1338, she married Maurice de Berkeley, 4th Baron Berkeley, who was ironically a grandson of Roger Mortimer, 1st Earl of March, the man largely responsible for the execution of Elizabeth's father Hugh. She and her husband had four sons and three daughters.

As a widow Elizabeth married Sir Maurice Wyth.

== Death ==
Elizabeth le Despenser, Baroness Berkeley died on 13 July 1389. She was buried at St Botolph's Aldgate, London, England.

== Ancestry ==
Ancestors of Elizabeth le Despenser, Baroness Berkeley

16. Hugh le Despenser
8.Hugh le Despencer, 1st Baron le Despencer
4.Hugh le Despenser, 1st Earl of Winchester
18. Philip Basset
9. Aline Bassett
19. Hawise de Gray
2.Hugh Despenser the Younger
20. William de Beauchamp
10. William de Beauchamp, 9th Earl of Warwick
21. Isabel Mauduit
5. Isabella de Beauchamp
22. John Fitzgeoffrey
11. Maud FitzJohn
23. Isabel Bigod
1. Elizabeth le Despenser
24. Gilbert de Clare, 4th Earl of Hertford
12. Richard de Clare, 5th Earl of Hertford
25. Isabel Marshal
6.Gilbert de Clare, 6th Earl of Hertford
26. John de Lacy, 1st Earl of Lincoln
13. Maud de Lacy
27. Margaret de Quincy, Countess of Lincoln
3.Eleanor de Clare
28. Henry III of England
14. Edward I of England
29. Eleanor of Provence
7. Joan of Acre
30. Ferdinand III of Castile
15. Eleanor of Castile
31. Joan of Ponthieu
