= Jordan of Bristol =

Saint

Saint Jordan of Bristol
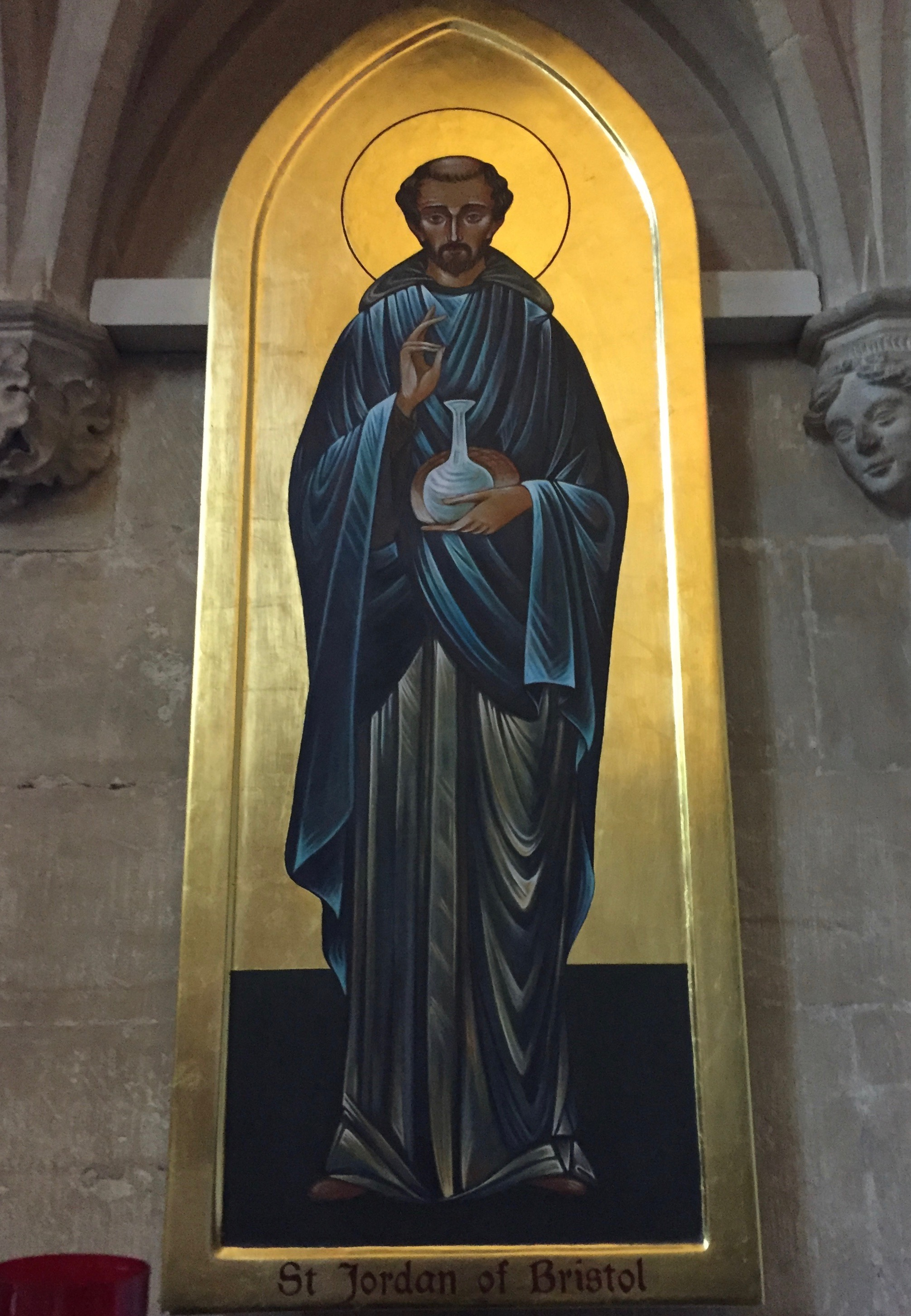
- Icon by Helen McIldowie-Jenkins, displayed at Bristol Cathedral

Confessor
- Residence: Bristol region, England
- Venerated in: Historically, Roman Catholicism; currently, the Church of England's Diocese of Bristol
- Major shrine: Chapel of St. Jordan, College Green, Bristol (no longer extant); Bristol Cathedral
- Attributes: Youth, Roman, noble, the habit and tonsure of a monk, hand raised in blessing, bearing bread and wine, companion of Augustine of Canterbury
- Patronage: The city of Bristol and College Green; the English people and the English church
- Catholic cult suppressed: 1539, the Dissolution of the Monasteries

Jordan of Bristol (Latin: Iordanus) was a saint venerated in Bristol, England, before the Reformation, about whom little is known with certainty.

Traditionally, Jordan was considered a companion of Augustine of Canterbury who came to the South West of England in the early 7th century, founded a local church, and was later venerated as a saint. A chapel consecrated to Jordan is known to have existed on College Green in Bristol in the 14th century.

From the 19th century, historians and genealogists began to question the traditional portrayal of Jordan's life and propose alternative theories about his identity, while others continued to support the traditional view.

== Life ==
Jordan's background and the origins of his cult at Bristol are contested and unclear. A 15th century hymn to the saint describes him as a companion of Augustine of Canterbury who helped preach the gospel to the English and whose relics were later entombed at Bristol.

According to David H. Higgins of Bristol University, Jordan may have been a young monk of the noble Jordan family who lived at St. Andrew's Monastery in Rome, before accompanying Augustine on the Gregorian mission to convert the English. Drawing on toponymic evidence and references to Jordan in the work of 16th-century antiquarians John Leland and William Camden, Higgins argued that Jordan must have traveled with Augustine to the West of England to attend a crucial conference with the Celtic bishops, after which he may have founded the first monastery in the Bristol region and remained there.

Accounting for the lack of references to Jordan in Bede's Ecclesiastical History of the English People, Higgins explained that Jordan may have been among the "many relatively young, probably as yet unordained monks that composed the membership of the Roman missions." He concluded that Augustine may only have ordained Jordan a priest or deacon after he had reached the age of 30 and that his missionary activities may have taken a more "folk-centered" character, lacking the kind of "political weight" and "central ecclesiastical acclaim" that would have ensured a mention in Bede. Higgins further explained the scarcity of historical information about Jordan's mission by pointing to the following factors: Jordan's isolated position "among the largely pagan West Saxons [and] politically suppressed Christian British folk", the fact that he may have died before the Synod of Whitby in 664, Bede's prejudices against the British Christians which Jordan would likely have served, and Bede's desire to emphasize the senior role of Birinus in converting the West of England.

The historian Michael Hare, on the other hand, has suggested that Jordan was more plausibly a hermit of the 13th or 14th century who lived in a chapel on College Green. According to this view, Jordan was only later described as a companion of Augustine of Canterbury by the 15th-century hymn writer.

In 1899, George Edward Weare suggested that Jordan may have been a close relative of Robert Fitzharding, the founder of St. Augustine's Abbey, and that the chapel named in his honour on College Green may have been built by him or "erected after his death as a memorial". Weare concluded that the monks of St. Augustine's Abbey must have transformed Jordan into a saint to increase the abbey's prestige.

A. S. Ellis, a genealogical researcher of the Fitzharding and Berkeley families, supported this claim, arguing that Jordan, "brother of Robert fitz Harding ... may in his old age have been a canon in the adjoining abbey founded by his brother or [may] have built [the chapel on College Green] with a hermitage to retire from the world therein." If Weare and Ellis's conclusions are correct, Jordan, like Robert Fitzharding, would be the son of Harding of Bristol and the grandson of Eadnoth the Staller, the Anglo-Saxon thegn and steward to Edward the Confessor. Little is known about this Jordan Fitzharding except that he "was one of the law-worthy men of Bristol's hundred court on one occasion between 1176 and 1183." A. S. Ellis believed him to be the progenitor of the De La Warr family, a name Ellis thought he may have received as a result of living in "that street at Bristol called 'the Weir,' from its proximity to the dam of the mills on the river Frome immediately beneath the [Bristol] castle walls".

== Veneration ==
Although antiquarians such as John Leland have traditionally wanted to date the origin of Jordan's cult to a time long before the building of Bristol's Norman-era cathedral, the earliest evidence for its existence can actually be found in the will of widow Agnes Spelly, who left a donation to the chapel of Saint Jordan on College Green in 1393. Later references to Jordan's cult can be found in financial record-keeping of St. Augustine's Abbey, Bristol: in the year 1491–92, funds were described as being taken "from the pyx within St. Jordan's chapel on the green" (Latin: Capellam sancti Iordani in viridi placea). In the year 1511–12, offerings to Jordan were made in a side chapel of St. Augustine's Abbey.

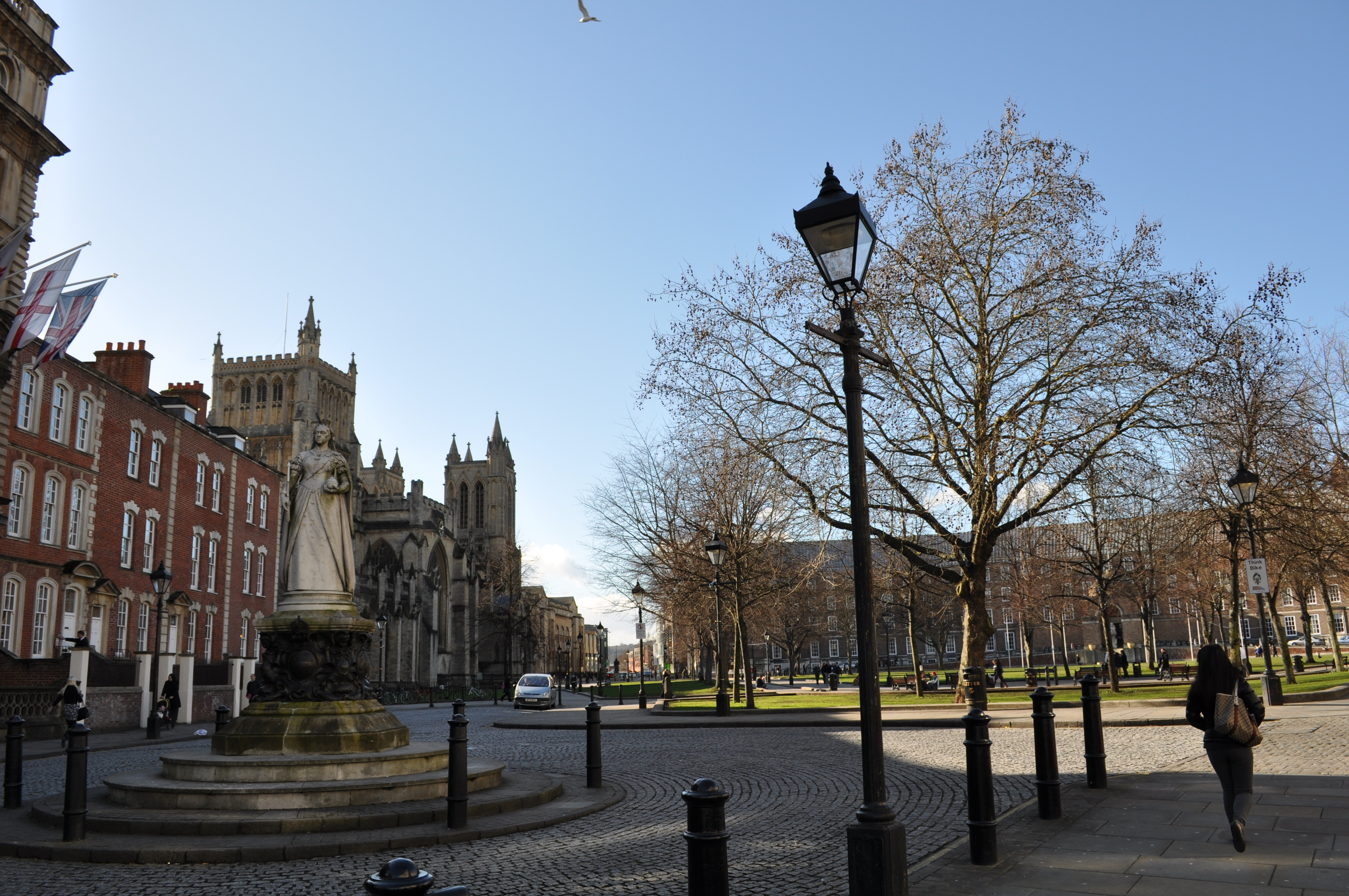
View of College Green, where the chapel of St. Jordan stood before the Reformation and where his relics were, according to a 15th-century hymn writer, entombed.

According to M. R. James, a hymn and collect to Jordan, found in a Bristol Book of Hours, were used in the chapel on College Green in the 15th century. The hymn reads, in part, as follows:

O Jordan, blessed confessor of Christ and citizen of Heaven, intercede for us by virtue of the faith we of the English church profess, whom Augustine [first] baptised and you perfected in that holy trust, whose colleague (alt. companion) you were in his preaching to the English. Be our Patron [saint] in this place where you lie entombed.

Based on the content of this hymn and its accompanying collect, David H. Higgins concluded:

The hymn and collect, in fact, provide confirmation ... that, in the official understanding of the Church itself, St. Jordan had worked as St. Augustine's colleague in evangelizing the west country, had finally merited the title and dignity of a Confessor of the Faith and that the chapel (oratorium) of St. Jordan on the Green had contained Jordan's tomb.

While the name Jordan had been popularized in England by pilgrims returning from the Holy Land with bottles of water from the Jordan River, Peter Fleming of the University of the West of England has described the relatively greater frequency of the name in 12th-century Bristol, especially among the noble Fitzharding and Berkeley families, as itself evidence of a significant cult of St. Jordan in the city:

That four members of Robert [fitz Harding's] wider family circle should have been called Jordan is almost certainly no coincidence. Robert fitz Harding, first Lord Berkeley of the second creation, was founder of St Augustine’s Abbey, in his lordship of Bilswick, which also encompassed the Green where St. Jordan is supposed to have been buried and where stood his chapel. The name of Robert’s brother, Jordan fitz Harding, suggests that the saint’s cult existed in Bristol, and enjoyed the patronage of the locally powerful family of Harding, from at least the early twelfth century. Bristolians continued to name their sons after St Jordan into the fifteenth century. ... Clearly, St Jordan's tomb was the object of veneration in pre-Reformation Bristol, and a significant number of Bristolians were in some sense devotees.

Fleming concluded that College Green in the 14th and 15th centuries was "the focus of the local cult of St. Jordan and the site of his chapel"; that "during Lent and Easter, the mayor and councillors would attend sermons preached by the cross next to St. Jordan's chapel"; and that "the Berkeleys had conceived a special devotion to the saint."

Samuel Seyer, the early-19th-century historian of Bristol, also supported the view that Jordan, brother of Robert Fitzharding, had been named after an earlier saint, but he firmly believed this saint had been a member of the Gregorian mission, writing, "Nothing is more probable than that the pious founder of the abbey [Robert Fitzharding] gave it its name in memory of St. Augustine; and that Harding, his father, named one of his sons Jordan, in memory of the preacher, Augustine's companion."

Despite these indications of the cult's presence in the city, Fleming concluded that the extent of Bristolians' veneration of Jordan remained unclear, partly because "his name is not known to have been attached to any other location in Bristol," and "there is no reference to him in Ricart's Kalendar." In other words, Jordan may always have been seen as a "specifically Berkeley, or north Bristol, saint" rather than "being regarded as... truly Bristolian."

Today, Bristol Cathedral displays an icon of St. Jordan in the Elder Lady Chapel. The icon was painted by Helen McIldowie-Jenkins. In 2012, the BBC, Bristol Cathedral, and the University of Bristol called Jordan "the patron saint of Bristol" and "Bristol's enigmatic 'patron saint.'"

== Historicity ==
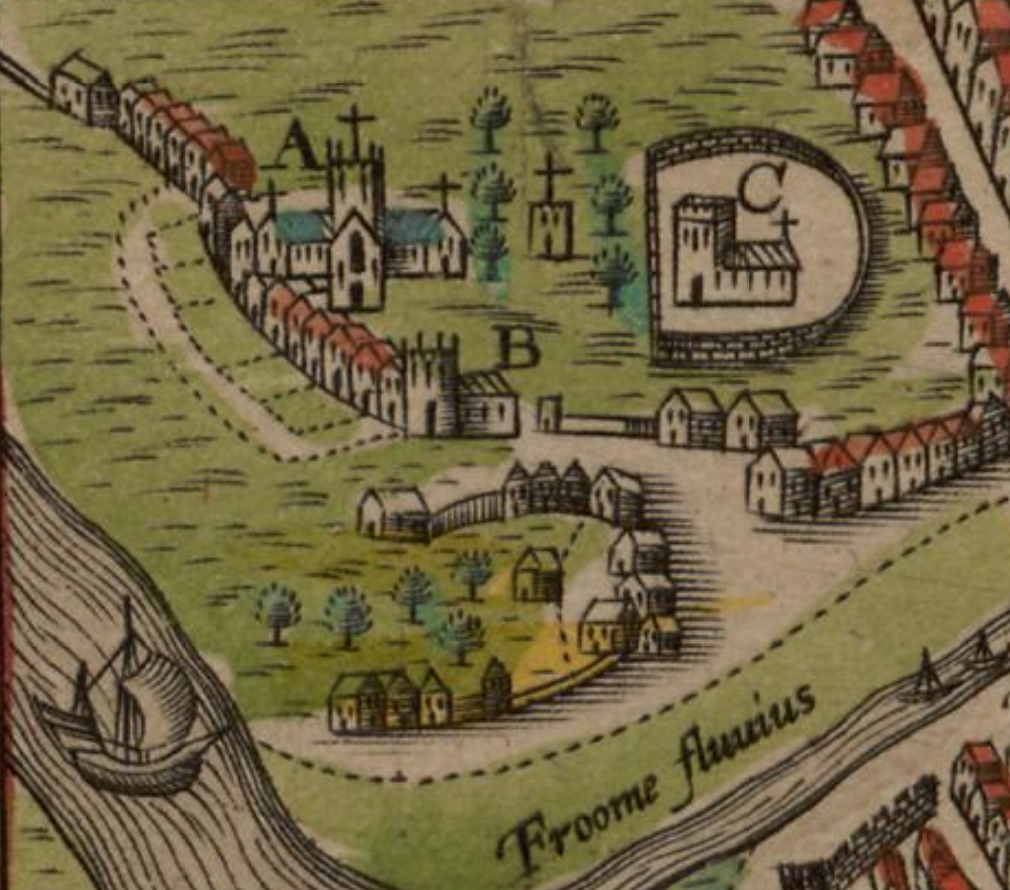
John Speed's 1610 map showing the former chapel of St. Jordan between Bristol Cathedral (A) and St. Mark's Church (C).

In 2012, archaeologists began a survey at College Green in Bristol, with speculation on the part of the Dean of Bristol Cathedral, the Very Reverend David Hoyle, that Jordan's chapel and relics might be discovered. Although no evidence was found, the Bristol City Council website explains that "any archaeological evidence which might have confirmed the site of St Jordan's chapel was destroyed" when "College Green was levelled for the building of the Council House in 1950." However, maps of Bristol from the 17th century by cartographers John Speed and James Millerd appear to show the location of St. Jordan's former chapel before it was destroyed. John Speed's map of 1610, in particular, corresponds to William Camden's description of the former chapel's location as a "green plain, shaded all along the middle with a double row of trees; among which is a pulpit of stone, and a Chapel, wherein they say, that Jordan, Companion to St. Austin the English Apostle, was bury’d."

Due to an absence of references to Jordan in important texts such as Bede's Ecclesiastical History of the English People, Michael Hare dismissed as fiction the description of Jordan as a companion of Augustine of Canterbury; instead, he claims he was probably a local saint of the late Middle Ages. Gwen Beachcroft and Arthur Sabin of the Bristol Record Society, on the other hand, claimed in 1938 that "the story of Saint Jordan, disciple of Saint Augustine, may have been invented to give an air of sanctity to what had been secular land [of the St. Augustine's Abbey sanctuary]."
