= Maurice de Gaunt =

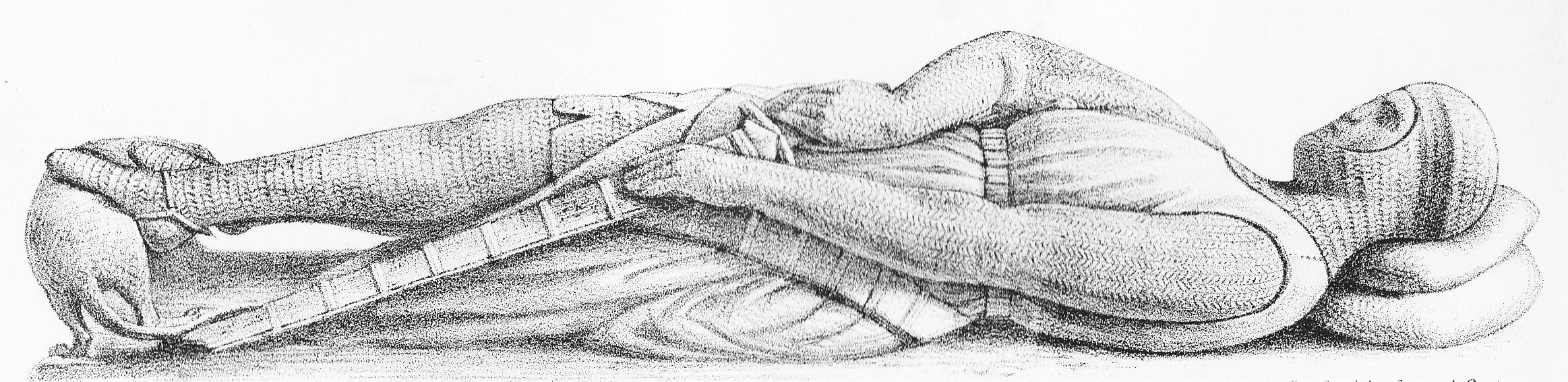
Effigy of Maurice de Gaunt in the south aisle of the Lord Mayor's Chapel, Bristol

Maurice de Gaunt (before 1200 – 1230) was the founder of Beverston Castle in Gloucestershire, England. He began the construction c. 1225 without royal licence, and completed the project in 1229 with the granting of a licence for the final crenellation. Beverston Castle was further enlarged in the mid-fourteenth century and saw action in the English Civil War. The castle is in partial ruin with occupancy as of 2006.

He was the grandson of Robert Fitzharding, the founder of St Augustine's Abbey, which was the forerunner of Bristol Cathedral.

Maurice de Gaunt was the founder, together with his nephew Robert de Gournay, of St Mark's Hospital in Bristol, otherwise known as Gaunt's Hospital. The church of St Mark's Hospital later became the Lord Mayor's Chapel.

== See also ==
- Beverston
- History of Gloucestershire

== Sources ==
- Barker, W.R. St Mark's or The Mayor's Chapel, Bristol, formerly called the Church of the Gaunts. Bristol, 1892
