= St Mary's Church, Beverston =

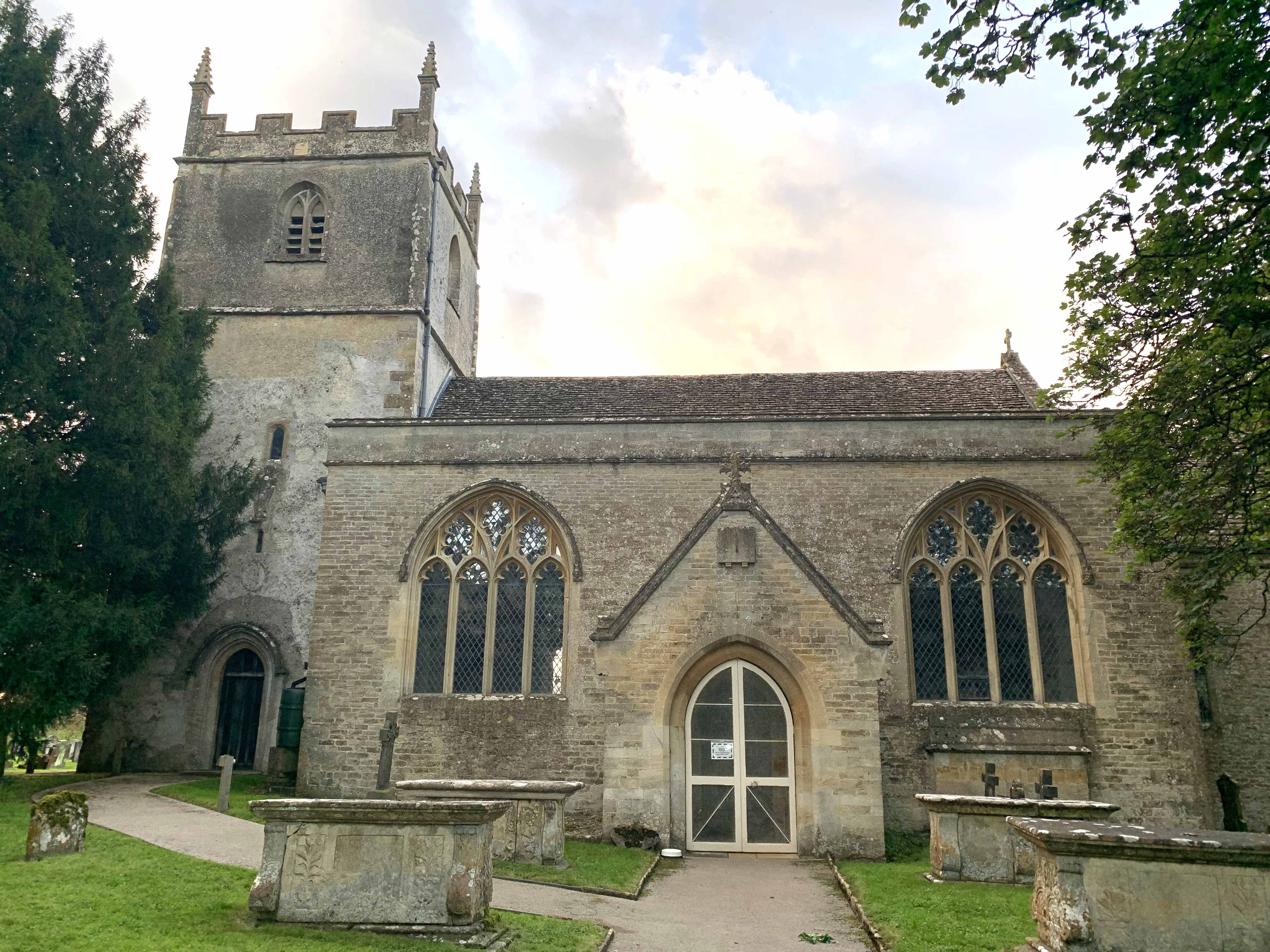
- St Mary's Church, Beverston
- St Mary's Church, Beverston
- 51°38′41″N 2°12′05″W
- Location: Beverston
- Country: England
- Denomination: Church of England

Architecture
- Heritage designation: Grade II* listed
- Style: Norman, Early English
- Years built: 12th century

Administration
- Parish: Beverston

The Church of Saint Mary the Virgin is the parish church of Beverston, Gloucestershire, England, and a Grade II* listed building. The church is of Norman foundation, most likely built upon a Saxon site, extended in around 1225 and again in 1361 by Thomas de Berkeley, 5th Baron Berkeley, Lord of Berkeley Castle. The church was restored in the mid Nineteenth Century, probably by the architect Lewis Vulliamy, and again in the late Nineteenth Century. The church is situated next door to Beverston Castle.

== History ==
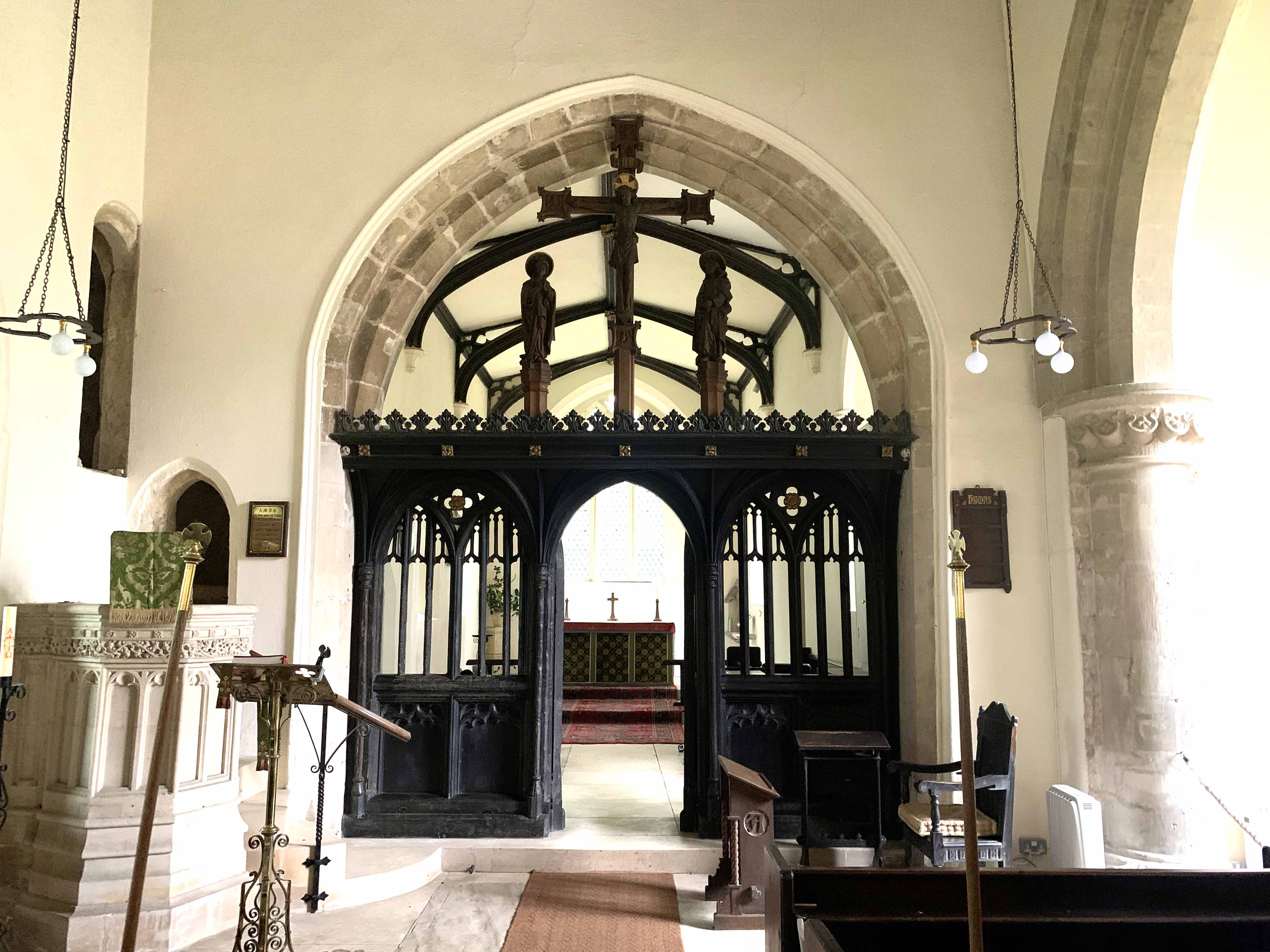
Interior of St Mary's Church, Beverston

=== Saxon and Norman foundations ===
The church is of Norman origins, most likely built upon a Saxon site. It was extended in around 1225 and in 1361 by Thomas de Berkeley, 5th Baron Berkeley, Lord of Berkeley Castle. The church boasts a tower of two stages and a pointed arch doorway on the South side with a sculpture of Christ that pre-dates the Norman Conquest.

=== Medieval and Tudor era ===
The South aisle was likely added in the 13th century. The Chancel was built in the 14th century, most likely in around 1361 when the nearby castle was refortified. The chancel screen is largely original timber and dates from the Fifteenth Century, later restored in the Nineteenth Century. The carved stone pulpit is of Tudor origin.

=== 17th and 18th centuries ===
There are a number of late 17th and early 18th century monuments on the west wall, and a large monument in the south aisle to one William Tugwell dates from 1763.

=== 19th century ===
By the 19th century the church had fallen into disrepair, and was in need of restoration. The roof dates to the Nineteenth Century and is by Lewis Vulliamy. At this time the rood screen was returned to the church, having served for some while as a pergola in the Rector's garden.

In 1884 Reverend Arthur Blomfield carried out renovations. Rev. Blomfield is buried at the Church.

== Today ==
The church is designated as a Grade II* listed building. The church is open from nine to five every day.

== Gallery ==
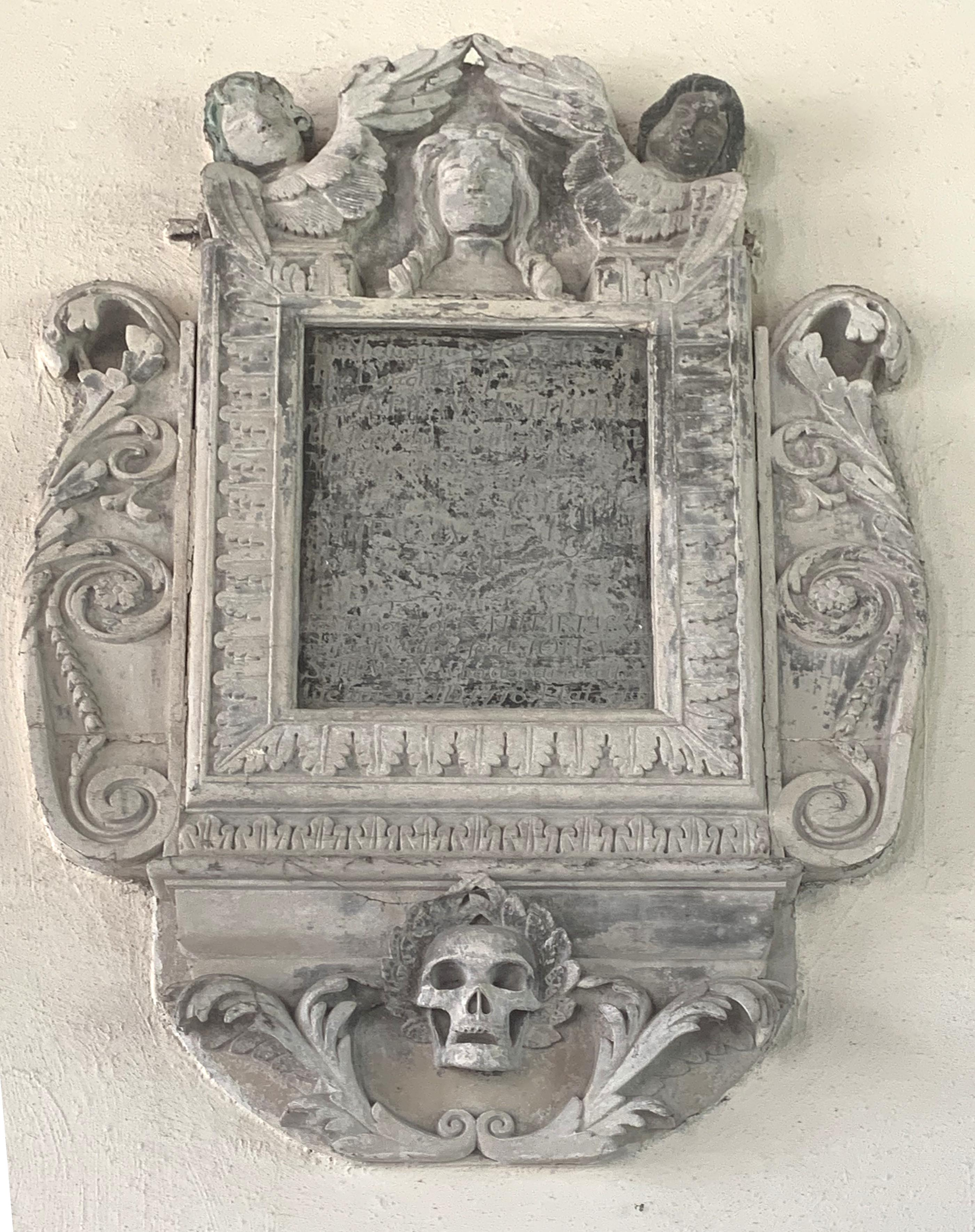
18th Century Memorial Plaque

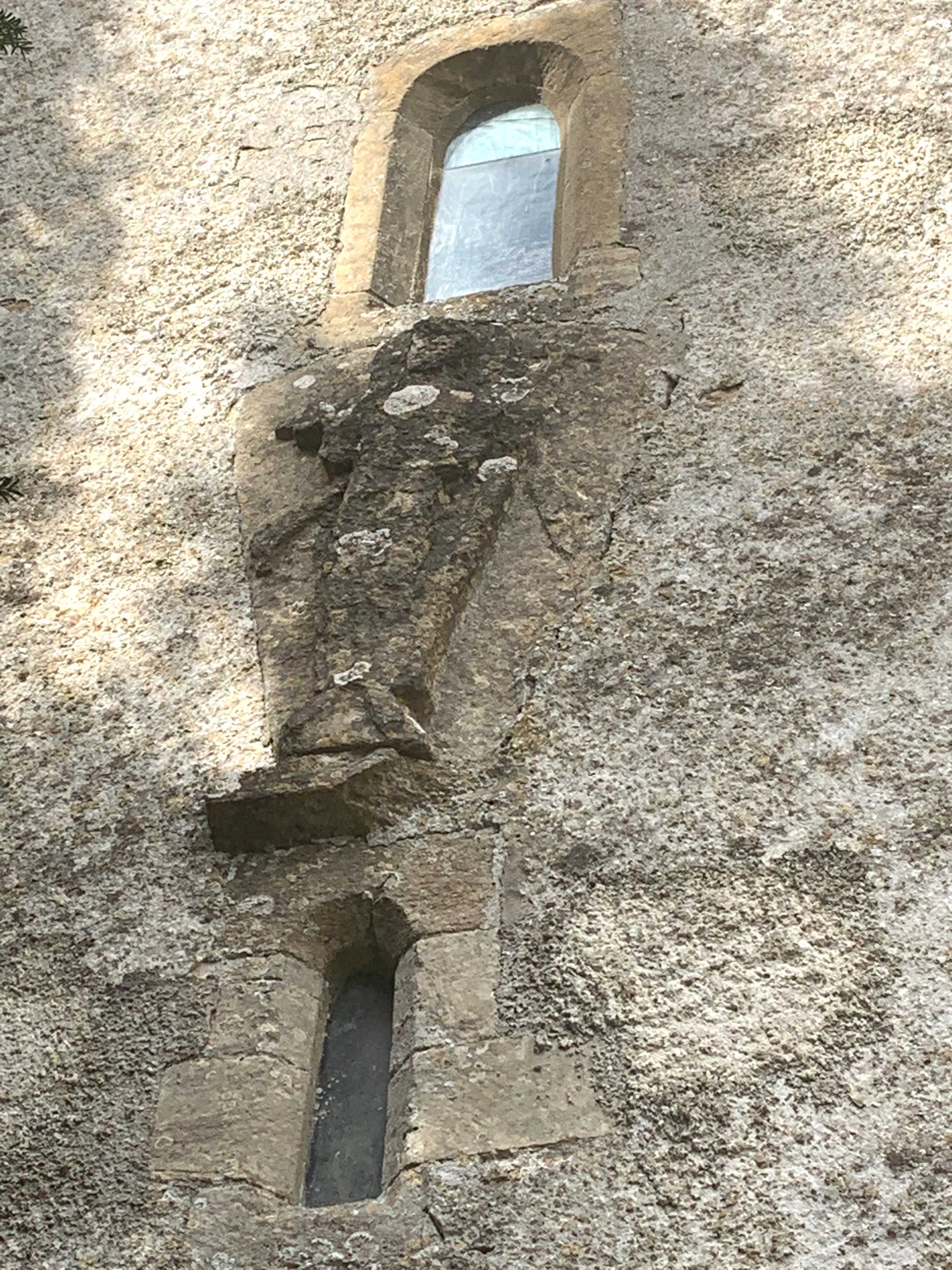
Saxon Sculpture of Christ

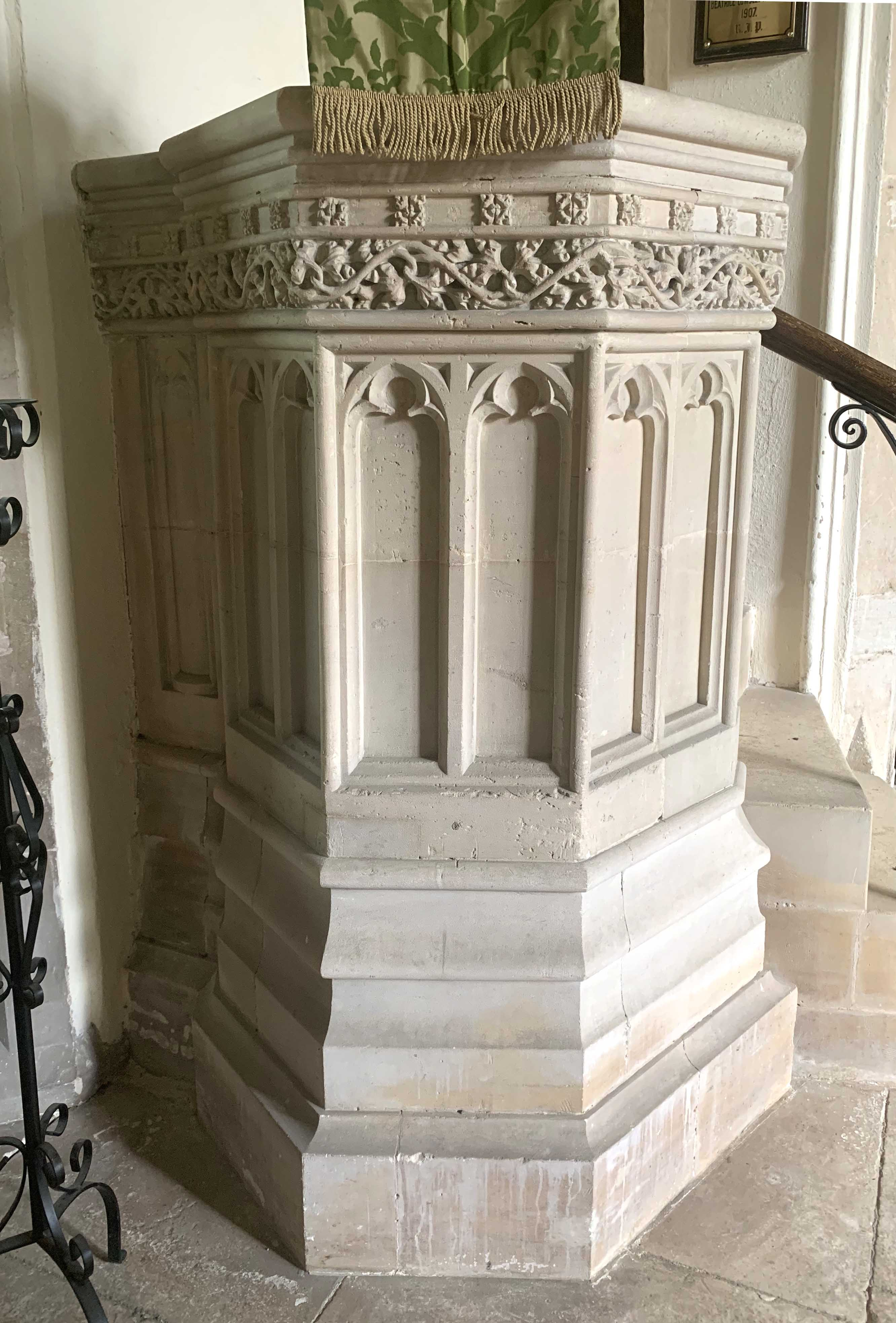
Tudor pulpit

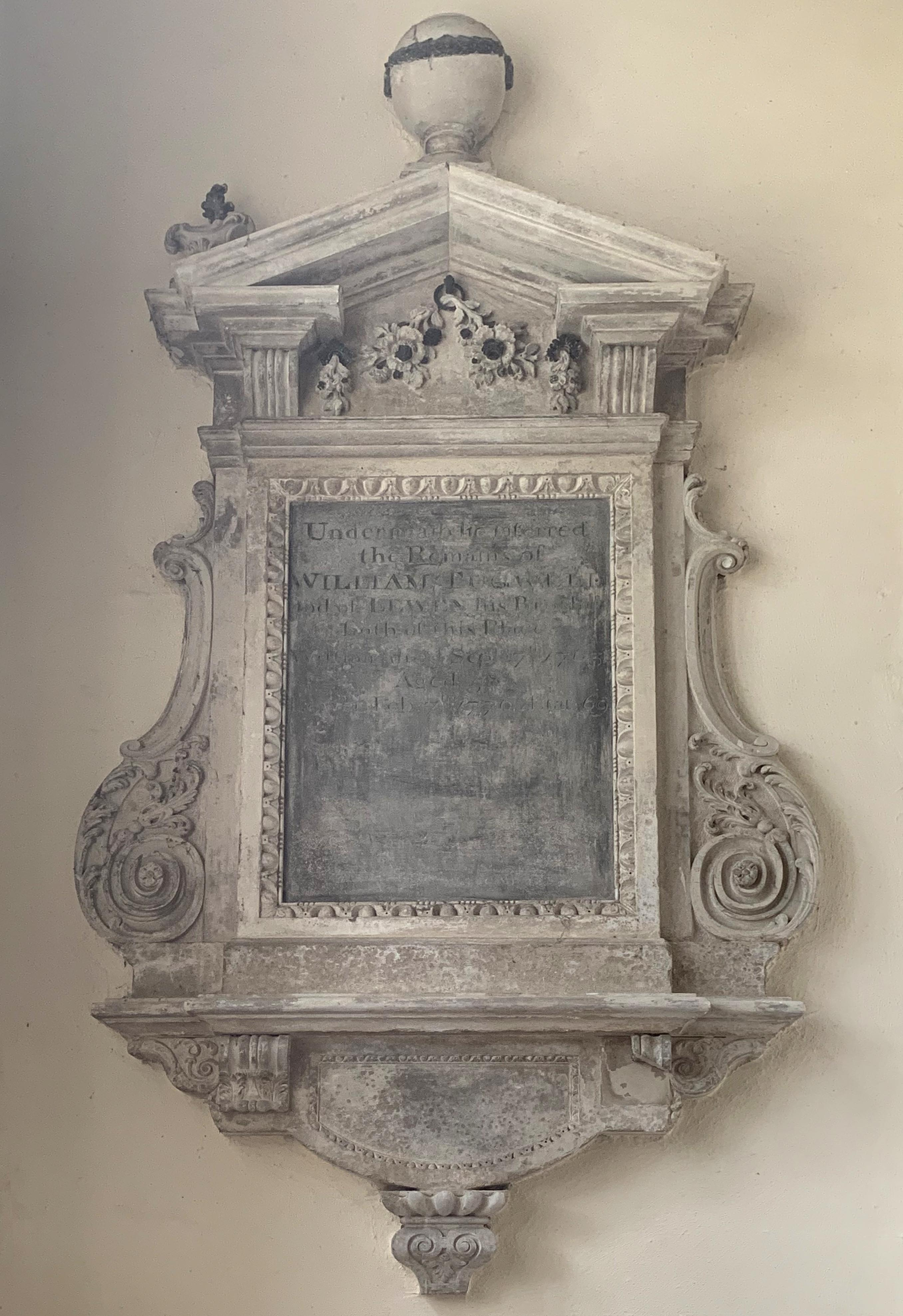
Memorial to William Tugwell
