= Miles Salley =

Bishop of Llandaff, Wales (died 1516)

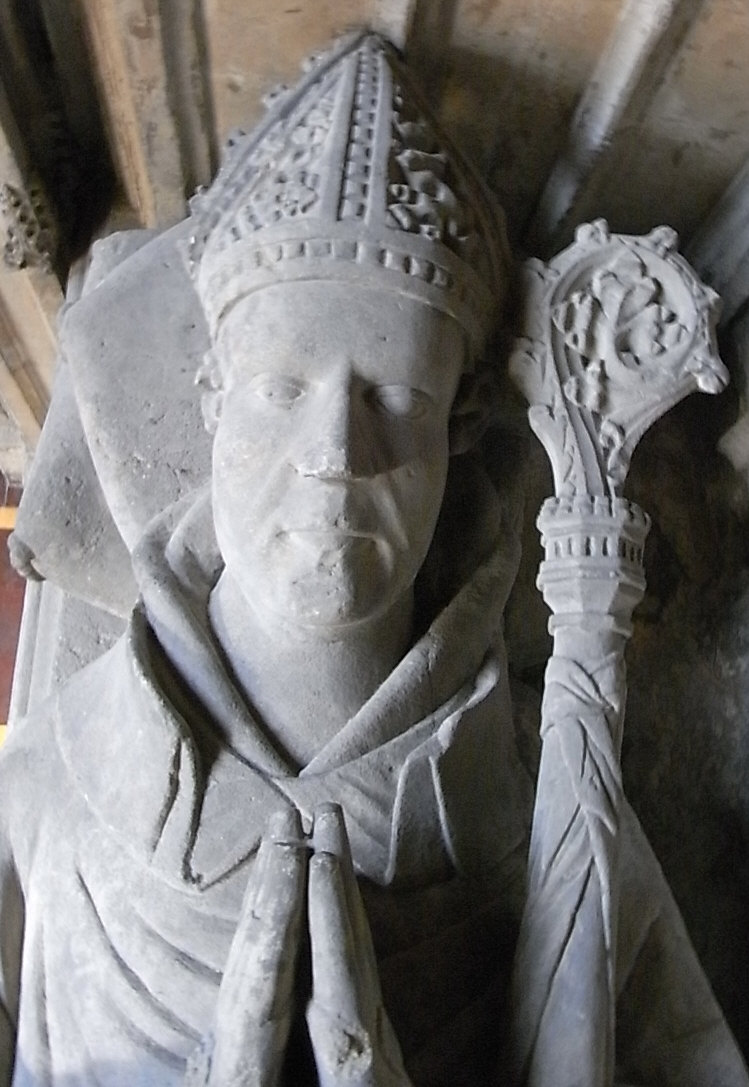
Effigy of Bishop Salley in The Gaunt's Chapel, Bristol

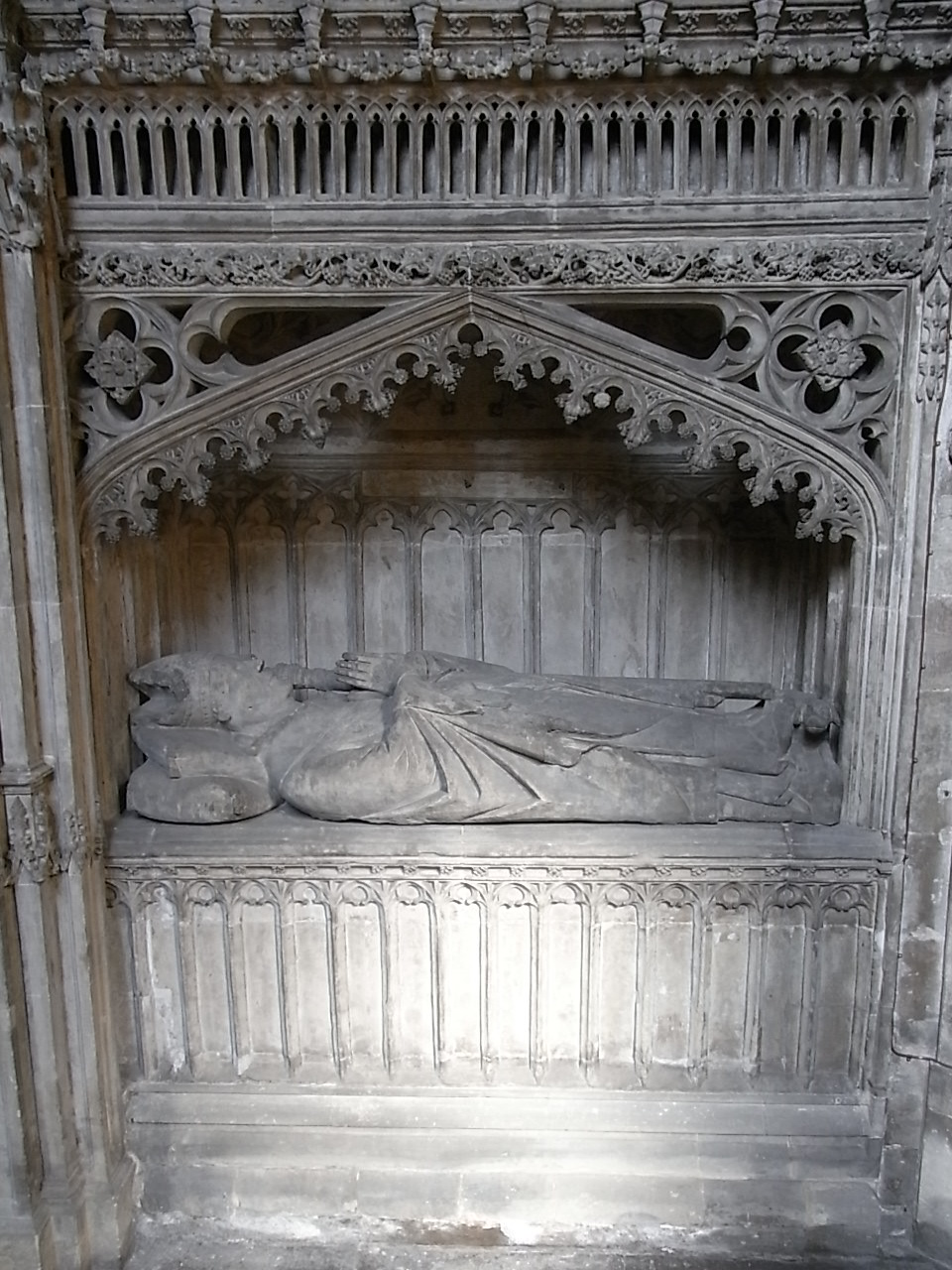
Tomb of Bishop Salley in The Gaunt's Chapel, Bristol

Miles Salley (died 1516) was a late 15th-century Abbot of Eynsham Abbey and Abingdon Abbey and an early 16th-century Bishop of Llandaff. Salley was Abbot of Eynsham in Oxfordshire in the 1490s. He was appointed Bishop of Llandaff, where he is remembered for his building work at the Bishop's Palace in Mathern in Monmouthshire.

He also rebuilt the chancel and south aisle of The Gaunt's Chapel, Bristol, and donated the reredos.

== Biography ==
Salley was a monk in Abingdon Abbey during the 1480s, and probably entered the decade before as a youth. In 1486, he was caught delivering money to supporters of John de la Pole's Rebellion against Henry VII. Salley was ordered to forfeit all goods and was imprisoned for a time. He was pardoned in 1492, and by 1496 he was acting as almoner and in charge of the kitchen at Abingdon, effectively the fourth most senior monk there.

He was elected as abbot of Eynsham Abbey in 1498, and around that time he was given the title of Bishop of Llandaff by the king. In this role, he was able to sit in parliament, was given a house in The Strand, as well as one in Bristol. He attended state occasions, such as the funeral of Henry VII, and Thomas Wolsey's appointment as cardinal.

== Legacy ==
Salley died in December 1516. His heart and bowels were buried at the high altar in St Tewdric's Church and his body was buried in The Gaunt's Chapel, Bristol, where a fine chest tomb surmounted by his effigy exists on the north wall of the chancel. In his will, he left items and money to a number of organisations including Llandaff Cathedral, Mathern church, Eynsham Abbey and St Mark's hospital.

== Sources ==
- Parker, W.R., St Mark's or The Mayor's Chapel, Bristol (Formerly Called the Church of the Gaunts), Bristol, 1892, pp. 163–165
