= St Mark's Church, Bristol =

Church in Bristol, England

Coordinates: 51.4517°N 2.6015°W

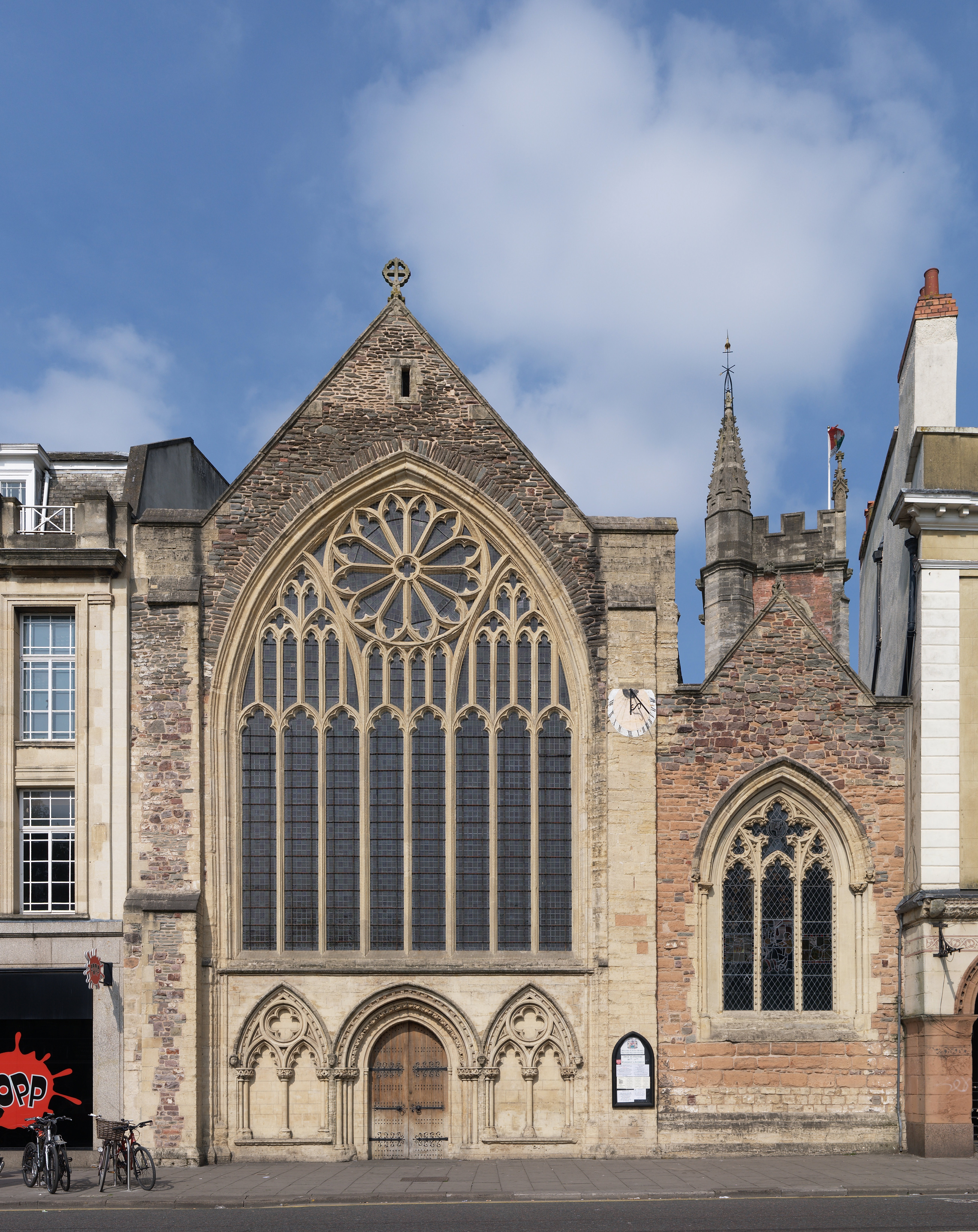
St Mark's Church, Bristol, west front, remodelled in 1830 and 1889. The south aisle window is visible on the right side, the tower to the rear, behind which is the Poyntz Chapel. Bristol Cathedral is behind the viewer, across a large grass lawn, formerly a graveyard used by both churches. lordmayorschapel.org

St Mark's Church, Bristol, west front, as drawn c. 1892 following restoration

St Mark's Church is an ancient church on the north-east side of College Green, Bristol, England, built c. 1230. Better known to mediaeval and Tudor historians as the Gaunt's Chapel, it has also been known within Bristol since 1722 as the Lord Mayor's Chapel. It is one of only two churches in England privately owned and used for worship by a city corporation. The other is St Lawrence Jewry, London. It stands opposite St Augustine's Abbey (after 1542 Bristol Cathedral), founded by a member of the Berkeley family of nearby Berkeley Castle, from which it was originally separated by the Abbey's burial ground, now called College Green. It was built as the chapel to the adjacent Gaunt's Hospital, now demolished, founded in 1220. Except for the west front, the church has been enclosed by later adjacent buildings, although the tower is still visible. The church contains some fine late gothic features and a collection of continental stained glass. It is designated by Historic England as a grade I listed building.

== Foundation ==
Seal of The Gaunt's Hospital, Bristol. Legend in Lombardic capitals: S(IGILLUM) CO(MMUN)E DOM(US) S(AN)C(T)I MARCI(I) DE BILLESWYK JUXTA BRISTOLL(IAM) ("The common seal of the House of St Mark of Billeswyk-by-Bristol"). The upper 2/3 consists of 2 gothic niches, the right hand one containing the figure of St Mark seated at a desk writing his gospel. In the niche opposite is a lion, the evangelist's emblem, sejant rampant. In the lower 1/3 within a simple lancet shaped niche is the kneeling figure of the donor with hands together in prayer, looking above right towards the saint in supplication. There are 3 heater-shaped escutcheons, the former heraldic designs on which have been worn away

In 1220 Maurice de Gaunt (d.1230), a grandson of Robert Fitzharding (d.1170), first feudal baron of Berkeley, Gloucestershire, founded a hospital, that is to say a mediaeval charitable residential institution, next to his grandfather's foundation of St Augustine's Abbey, to provide relief for the sick and poor. It was to be called the "Hospital of St Mark of Billeswyke-by-Bristol" and was housed in the Abbey's almonry. On Maurice's death in 1230, his nephew Robert de Gournay added to its endowment, made it independent of the Abbey and placed it under the control of Maurice's brother Henry de Gaunt. It became known informally as St Mark's Hospital or Gaunt's Hospital. The church for the use of the inmates of the hospital was built around 1230, and is the only part of the buildings extant today.

Maurice de Gaunt also founded Blackfriars in about 1227-9 (the cloisters now known as Quakers Friars).

== Notable burials ==
The church contains several chest tombs. Two of these, in the south aisle chapel, are of knights which may be the church's founders, Maurice de Gaunt and Robert de Gournay. There are more for other members of the Berkeley family, to which the founders were related. The chest tomb with effigy of Miles Salley(d.1516), Bishop of Llandaff from 1500, is in the chancel, to the south side of the altar. Many other members of the Berkeley family are buried in St Augustine's Abbey, now Bristol Cathedral

- Bishop Miles Salley(d.1516)
- Members of the Berkeley family
- Members of the Poyntz family, of Iron Acton, Glos.
- Reynborn Mathew(d.1470), 2nd son of Sir David Mathew(d.1484), of Llandaff, who had married Isabel Denys, da. of Maurice Denys(d.1466) and Alice Poyntz, half-aunt of Sir Robert Poyntz(d.1520).
- Thomas Mathew(d.pre 1470), 4th son of Sir David Mathew.
- Mary Denys(d.1593), da. of Sir William Denys(d.1535) & last prioress of Kington St. Michael Priory, Wilts. She was bequeathed by the will of her brother Sir Walter Denys(d.1571) his second best bed at Codrington. At the time of the Dissolution of her priory in 1535 she was called by the agent of Thomas Cromwell "a faire young woman of Lacock". She died "a good olde maid, verie vertuose & godlye & is buried in the church of the Gauntes on the grene."
- Sir Richard Berkeley(d.1604) of Stoke Gifford, whose recumbent effigy is situated to the right of the entrance door.
- Thomas James (d.1619), Mayor of Bristol and twice its MP, and his nephew, also Thomas James (d.1635), Arctic explorer, after whom James Bay is named.
- Margaret Hopton(d.1635), wife of Sir Baynham Throckmorton, 2nd Baronet(d.1664). Her husband erected a large and costly marble monument in her memory standing against the north wall of the South Aisle Chapel.

== Dissolution ==
The following letter from Dr Layton to Thomas Cromwell was written on St Bartholomew's Day, 1535:

“Pleas it your mastershipe to understonde, that yester nyght late we came from Glassynburie to Bristowe to Saint Austins, wheras we begyn this mornyng, intendyng this day to dispache bothe

this howse here, beyng but xiiii chanons, and also the Gawntes, wheras be iiii or v ... From Sainte Austines withoute Bristowe, this Saint Bartilmews day, at iiii of the cloke in the mornyng, by the spedy hande of your moste assurede poir preste, Rycharde Layton”.

Following the Dissolution of the Monasteries, in 1539 Sir Edward Carne (died 1561), who had acquired Ewenny Priory, Glamorgan, which he turned into his private residence, obtained the lease of Gaunt's Hospital, and acted as its treasurer, receiving its income from the many ancient bequests of lands and rents made to it. He was due to go abroad to help in arranging the ill-fated marriage of Anne of Cleves to King Henry VIII, and the revenue from the hospital was directed in the meantime to the support of his wife, Anne Denys, a daughter of Sir William Denys (died 1535) of Dyrham, Glos., by Anne Berkeley, da. of Maurice, 3rd Baron Berkeley (died 1506). Bristol Corporation objected, and in 1540 the church was purchased by Bristol Corporation. Anne's brother Sir Walter Denys(died 1571) was awarded the receivership of St Augustine's Abbey.

== Queen Elizabeth's Hospital School ==
From 1590 to 1767 a school known as Queen Elizabeth's Hospital utilised the former hospital building next to the church and used the church as its chapel.

== Huguenot use ==
Following the arrival of many Huguenots who fled from France to Bristol in the 17th century, Bristol City Corporation allowed them to use the chapel, from 1687 to 1722.

== Lord Mayor's chapel ==
In 1722 it became the official church of the Mayor and Corporation of Bristol.

== Architecture ==
The nave was built around 1230, and the south aisle around 1270–80. These parts are in the early decorated gothic style, while the rest of the church is of the later perpendicular style. The tower, constructed over the east end, was completed in 1487. The chancel, south aisle chapel and reredos are the result of rebuilding by Miles Salley(d.1516), Bishop of Llandaff, in about 1500. The nave's roof and another side chapel are early 16th century. The west front, with its geometric 12-petalled rose window, was a 15th-century design but was rebuilt in about 1830. In 1889 John Loughborough Pearson created a new west entrance, in the gothic style. The original west front was bought by Henry Brooke of Henbury Hill House, where it now stands as a “Folly” ruin.

=== Poyntz chapel ===
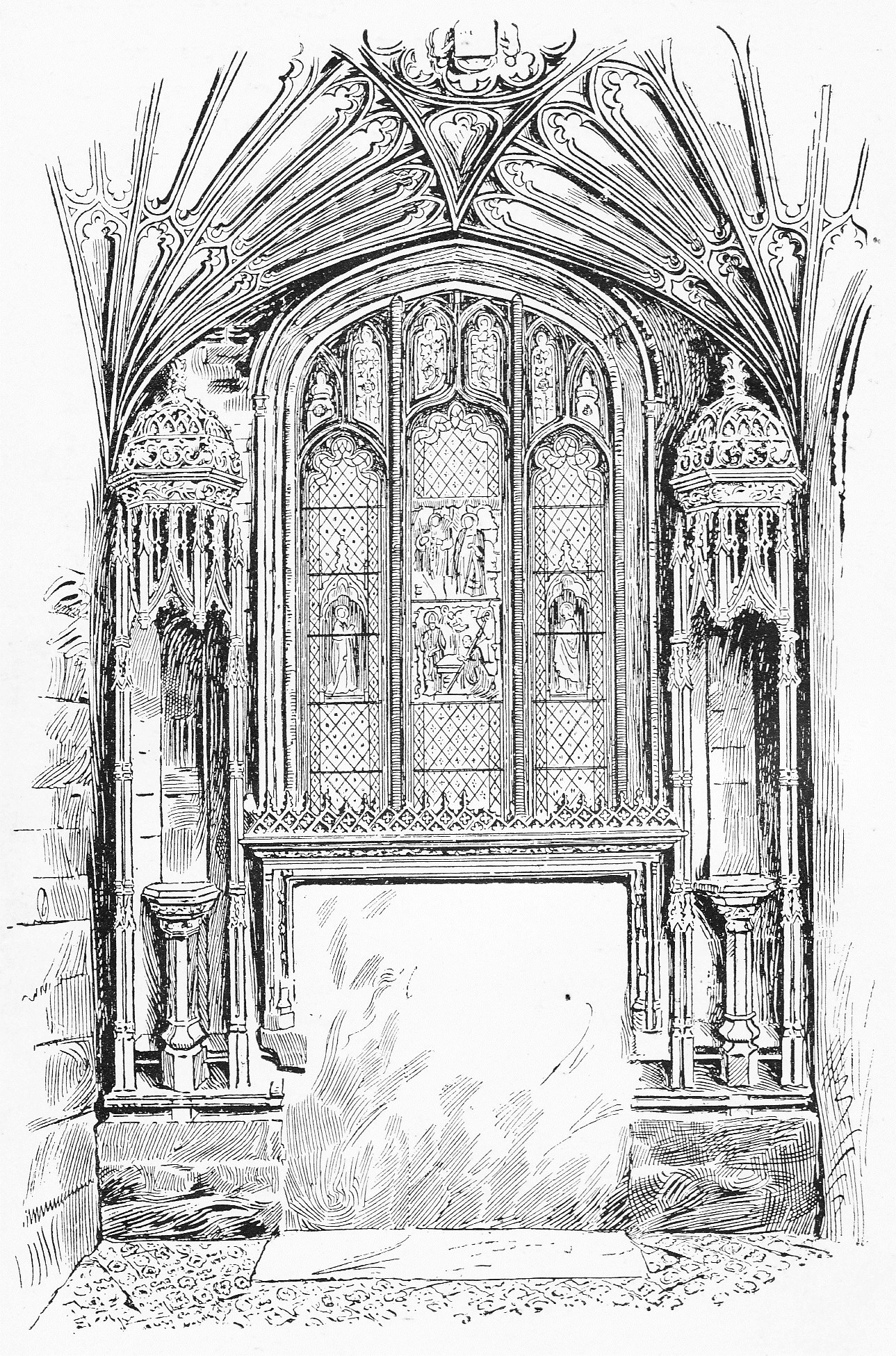
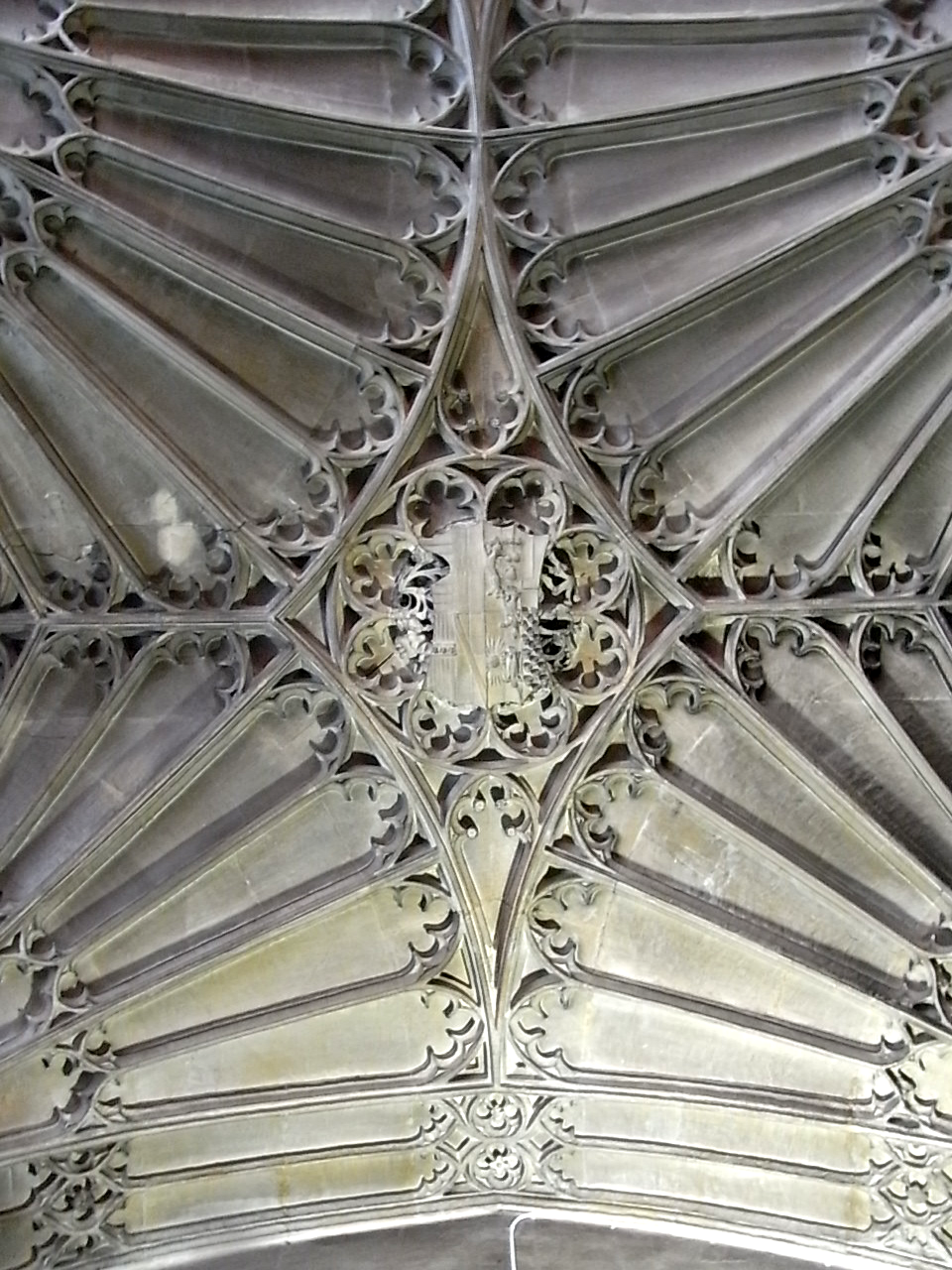
Poyntz Chapel in the Gaunt's Chapel, Bristol, built by Sir Robert Poyntz (d.1520); left: view towards east end formerly occupied by an altar, with Spanish floor-tiles; right: the fan-vaulted ceiling with Poyntz arms impaling Woodville in centre

Another fine addition, to the east end of the south aisle, beyond the tower, is the "Chapel of Jesus" or "Poyntz Chapel", built c.1523 as a chantry chapel by Sir Robert Poyntz (d.1520) of Iron Acton, Gloucestershire, a noted supporter of King Henry VII at the Battle of Bosworth in 1485. It should be distinguished from the Poyntz Chapel in Iron Acton Church, the family's chapel as lords of the manor. It is fan-vaulted, and has two niches of unknown use on the North wall. The floor is covered with coloured Spanish tiles, probably from Seville and contemporaneous with the building.

== Stained glass ==
In the early 19th century, Bristol Corporation took advantage of the sales of the collections of Sir Paul Baghott at Lypiatt Park and William Thomas Beckford at Fonthill Abbey to acquire an assortment of fine Continental stained glass for the church. From France there is a 15th-century depiction of two saints in the East window. There is more French glass in the nave, consisting of 16th-century mannerist work with grisaille, from Ecouen, and some 16th-century Bible scenes. From Steinfeld Abbey in Germany there are some 16th-century saints in the Poyntz chapel. In the south aisle chapel are 24 German and Flemish roundels, of the 16th or 17th centuries. The depiction of Thomas Becket in the south aisle, by Benjamin West in 1799, is also from Fonthill Abbey.

== Fittings ==
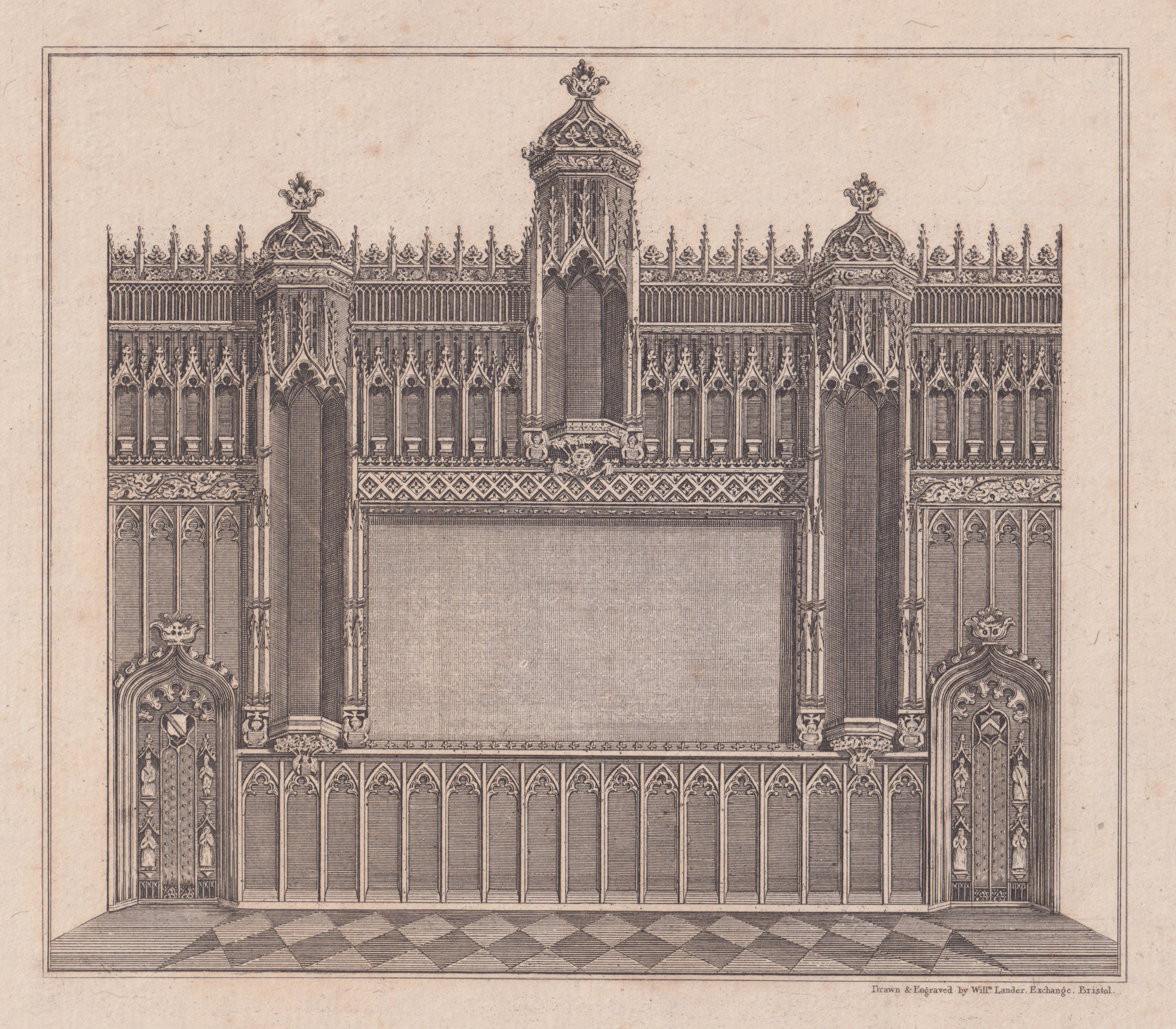
High Altar Screen, St Marks, 1823

The church contains some fine baroque wrought iron by the Bristol blacksmith William Edney. These consist of a sword rest of 1702 and the screen and gate for the south aisle chapel, which date to 1726. These were all moved from Temple Church, Bristol after it was bombed in the Bristol Blitz during World War II.

The medieval high altar screen was deliberately covered up in 1722 with wainscotting 'with the deliberate effort of concealing it'. The wainscotting was removed in 1820.

== Archives ==
Archives for the Lord Mayor's Chapel are held at Bristol Archives (Ref. LMC) (online catalogue) including administration, finance, building alterations, music, and service registers.

== Current usage ==
The church is open regularly for visitors and worship. It has been used to exhibit artwork involving caged birds singing along with a live pianist.

== See also ==
- Churches in Bristol
- Grade I listed buildings in Bristol

== Bibliography ==
- Barker, W.R. (1892). St Mark's or The Mayor's Chapel, Bristol (Formerly Called the Church of the Gaunts), Bristol.
- Dallaway, James (1823). "St. Mark's of the Gaunts, or the Mayor's Chapel". William Wyrcestre Redivivius. Bristol: J. Norton. pp. 25–33.
- Dugdale, Sir William. Monasticon, vol. 6, part 2, pp. 687–8
- Ralph, Elizabeth; Evans, Henley (1950). St. Mark's The Lord Mayor's Chapel Bristol (formerly the chapel of the Gaunts' Hospital). Corporation of Bristol.
- Ross, C. D., ed. (1959). Cartulary of St Mark's Hospital, Bristol. (Bristol Record Society, Vol. 21)
