= Calcot Manor =

Historic building in Gloucestershire, England

Coordinates: 51°39′12″N 2°13′56″W

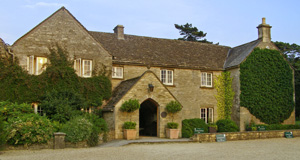
- Main entrance of the 16th-century Calcot Manor House
- Interactive map of the Calcot Manor area

General information
- Location: Calcot, England
- Opened: 1300
- Owner: Louisa and Michael Stone

Technical details
- Material: Limestone

Calcot Manor is a historic building in Calcot, three and a half miles west of Tetbury on A 4135 in Gloucestershire, England, near the junction of roads A46 and A4135 (National Grid Reference ST 841180 94891). The original building was established in approximately 1300 AD by Henry of Kingswood as a tithe barn annex of Kingswood Abbey. The estate was expanded to include a 16th-century manor house and other buildings. Structures added from the Late Middle Ages to the mid-17th century include a chapel, granary, stables and other buildings. The buildings are all constructed from limestone; which are locally quarried stones that are typically flat and easily stacked for drystone wall purposes.

== Roman period ==
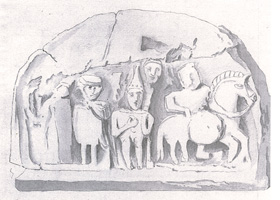
Roman Bas-relief carved stone found at Calcot

It is known that there was a Roman presence at the site as early as the 5th century AD based upon the archeological finds of carved stones, Roman coins and other discoveries.

Many Roman artefacts have been discovered at Calcot, some of which are displayed at the Gloucester City Museum and the Stroud Museum. One of the principal finds is a curved, ornate limestone bas-relief. This stone had originally been embedded in the wall of the tithe barn. This stone is now in the Ashmolean Museum in Oxford.

The bas-relief is classified as a tombstone, on which a Roman officer is shown on horseback carrying a shield. Behind the officer is the standard bearer with his insignia. As of Baddeley's publication in 1925, the stone was still embedded within the inner barn wall.

== Middle Ages ==
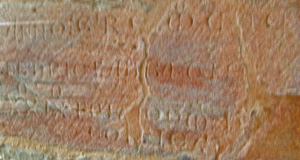
Original datestone circa 1300 AD extant in Calcot Tithe Barn wall.

The original datestone can be seen in the porch of the tithe barn and reads: "ANNOGRE MCCC HENRICI ABBATIS XXIX FAI DOM H EDIFICATA", verifying founding by Abbot Henry in the year 1300 during the reign of King Edward I. The barn is a Grade II listed building, and has so-called arrow slits in the end walls.

The remains of a medieval rabbit warren were unearthed in 2004. when the groundworks for a new spa extension to the hotel were being excavated. A tunnel was found extending at least 100 metres beneath the main manor house garden terrace. The tunnel is intact as of 2004, but has not yet been fully explored. Earth bore tunnels of this type are sometimes associated with High Middle Ages abbeys, palaces, and castles as secret escape routes if the site were under siege.

The hamlet of Calcot was listed in Domesday Book (1086 AD), as being in the Hundred of Berkeley. Although named a barn, its earliest origins and uses remain obscure due to architectural features that are not consistent with a barn or granary. For example, the upper level arrow slits situated on the west side is somewhat difficult to define as to early use, although somewhat wider arrow slits are known to have been used in 17th-century times as granary vents. According to Lumina Technologies: "The Calcot arrow slits for ventilation are typically at least ten centimetres wide to ensure that owls could freely enter and prey upon any mice that could harm the grain stocks".

== Middle ages to 18th century ==
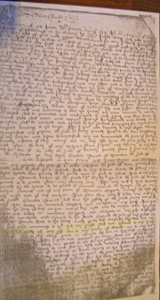
Last will and testament of Thomas Estcourt bequeathing Calcot estate, 1624 AD

When the English abbeys were dissolved in the early to middle 16th century, the Calcot property became property of the King of England, who in turn granted Calcot to Nicholas Poyntz. In 1559 Calcot was sold to Thomas Parry. Then in 1598 ownership of Calcot passed to Sir Thomas Estcourt, who was accumulating many other properties in the parishes of Newington Bagpath. The tithe barn was struck by lightning in 1728, and restoration was completed a year later, with the datestone embedded in the porch interior wall. The entire Calcot property remained in the possession of the Estcourt Family until the early 19th century.

A 1790 drawing of the tithe barn reveals the presence of an array of seven and possibly eight arrow slits across the front face of the structure. The slits were situated somewhat higher than the front-facing windows. These arrow slits are no longer present in the restored tithe barn.

The Sites and Monuments Record, SMR 2931/2, indicates that a small chapel previously existed on site, but was demolished most likely in the early 19th century. An ink drawing by Grimm of the chapel in 1790 shows the medieval arches of the early chapel.

== 20th century to the present ==
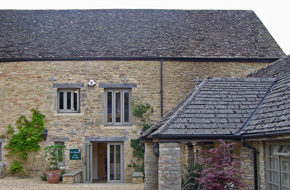
Restored Calcot Tithe Barn

In 1928, Mary Emery bought the ruined Calcot Tithe Barn roof and had it shipped to Mariemont, Ohio as individual roofing tiles. The tiles were used to build the roof of the Mariemont town church. Moss and lichens remained on the tiles, adding to the antique appearance wanted by Mariemont designers. Mariemont was created in imitation of the architecture of a medieval European town.

In 1970 the farm elements were relocated nearby, leaving all the old stone buildings surplus to farm requirements. The Ball family bought the Calcot estate in the early 1980s and began to convert the buildings for use as a hotel, the work continuing through the next decade. Louisa and Michael Stone, previously frequent guests, bought Calcot in early 1992 and restored the tithe barn in the early 2000s. By 2006 Calcot Manor had become an upmarket hotel and tourist destination in the Cotswolds.

== See also ==
- Beverston Castle
