= RAF Babdown Farm =

RAF Babdown Farm
- Near Beverston, Gloucestershire in England

Site information
- Type: Royal Air Force Relief Landing Ground
- Owner: Air Ministry
- Operator: Royal Air Force
- Controlled by: RAF Flying Training Command

Location
- Shown within Gloucestershire RAF Babdown Farm (the United Kingdom)
- Coordinates: 51°38′53″N 2°13′48″W

Site history
- Built: 1940
- In use: 1940 - 1948
- Battles/wars: European theatre of World War II

Airfield information
- Elevation: 175 metres (574 ft) AMSL
Runways
Direction	Length and surface
02/20	875 metres (2,871 ft) Sommerfeld Tracking
08/26	1,050 metres (3,445 ft) Sommerfeld Tracking
14/32	1,133 metres (3,717 ft) Sommerfeld Tracking

Royal Air Force Babdown Farm or more simply RAF Babdown Farm is a former Royal Air Force Relief Landing Ground located 2.9 miles (4.7 km) west of Tetbury, Gloucestershire, and 7.1 miles (11.4 km) south of Stroud, Gloucestershire, England. It was open between 1940 and 1948 as a relief landing ground used by training units before being used by maintenance units for storage. Part of the site has since been converted into an industrial estate, while the rest is used for agriculture.

== History ==
Babdown was built in 1940 as a relief landing ground (RLG) with two grass runways and a flare path for No. 9 Service Flying Training School initially flying Hawker Audaxes before changing to Miles Masters and Hawker Hurricanes. The airfield was bombed in 1940 and 1941 but no serious damage was caused. In 1942 the base was redeveloped to full RLG standard through the addition of three Sommerfeld Tracking runways and blister hangars with associated perimeter track and additional buildings.

Two flights of No. 3 Flying Instructors School moved into Babdown Farm when the airfield re-opened in August 1942, using the airfield for night flying with Airspeed Oxford and Miles Master trainers, with the rest of the unit at RAF Hullavington and RAF Castle Coombe. It was also used by Spitfires of No. 52 Operational Training Unit RAF during the daytime. A Standard Beam Approach system was installed in 1943, and No. 1532 (Beam Approach Training) Flight RAF moved in on 13 May that year to train aircrew in the use of the Beam Approach System. No. 3 Flying Instructors School moved out on 30 September 1943, with the Oxfords of No. 15 (Pilots) Advanced Flying Unit RAF moving in to the airfield on 28 October 1943. The last aircraft left during June 1945. It was used until 1948 by No. 7 Maintenance Unit RAF storing and repairing Airspeed Oxfords. As with the majority of airfields hosting training units there were a number of serious and fatal accidents due to pilot error and ageing machines which had been repeatedly used by inexperienced crews.

The following units were posted here at some point:

- No. 3 Flying Instructors School (Advanced) RAF with Airspeed Oxfords and Miles Masters from 1942 until early 1944
- No. 3 (Pilots) Advanced Flying Unit RAF
- No. 9 (Pilots) Advanced Flying Unit RAF
- No. 251 Maintenance Unit RAF

At its peak there were 571 RAF personnel and 223 Women's Auxiliary Air Force (WAAF) personnel based at Babdown.

== Current use ==
The site is now partially occupied by an industrial estate known as "Babdown Airfield" and the remainder has been returned to agriculture.
