= St Mary Magdalen Nunnery, Bristol =

St Mary Magdalen Nunnery
- Location within Bristol

Religion
- Affiliation: Roman Catholic
- Diocese: Kingsdown
- Ecclesiastical or organizational status: Demolished

Location
- Location: Bristol, England
- Interactive map of St Mary Magdalen Nunnery
- Coordinates: 51.45719°N 2.59782°W

St Mary Magdalen Nunnery (grid reference ST585733) was a priory of Augustinian canonesses in Kingsdown, Bristol, England. It was founded c. 1173 and dissolved in 1536. St Mary Magdalen is remembered in the name of Maudlin Street; the nunnery was located near to the corner of Maudlin Street and St Michael's Hill, which was later the site of the King David Inn.

== Foundation ==
The nunnery was founded by Eva Fitzharding, who endowed it with lands in Southmead and became its first prioress. Her ancestry is not known. She was the widow of Robert Fitzharding, a wealthy burgess of Bristol who had risen to become the Lord of Berkeley. He had founded St Augustine's Abbey, which later became Bristol Cathedral, and he too ended his days as a canon of the religious house he had founded.

== Later history ==
From the 13th century onwards the nunnery was very poor, and for that reason exempt from taxation and procuration payments to the Bishop of Worcester, within whose diocese the nunnery was. In 1480 when William Worcester was measuring out Bristol's religious buildings, there were only three nuns. He paced out their church as being just 27 steps long. His steps have been estimated at 21 inches (53 cm) on average. Some remains of the nunnery, Perpendicular in style, have been found on the site of the King David Inn.

In 1535 when the net annual incomes of the Bristol religious houses were assessed in the Valor Ecclesiasticus, St Mary Magdalen had a complement of 2 nuns and an income of £21, compared to the figures of 19 and £670 for St Augustine's Abbey.

== Dissolution ==
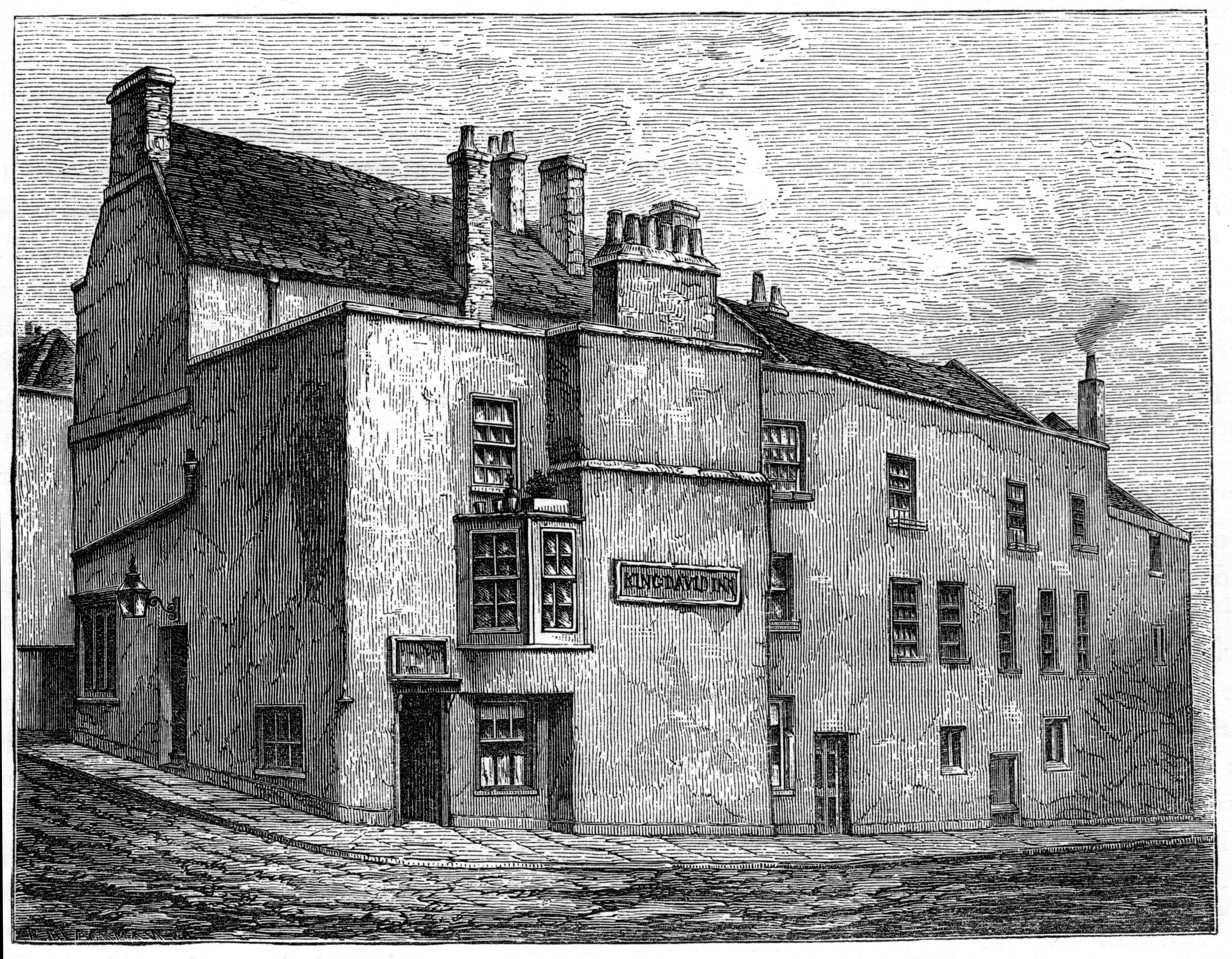
The inn on the site of the nunnery in 1882

In the Dissolution of the Monasteries, St Mary Magdalen was the only "lesser" religious house in Bristol to be seized by the Crown's commissioners under the Act for the Dissolution of the Lesser Monasteries, which was passed in 1536. They found the nunnery to be without debt and the building in good condition, but its possessions to be worth only a few pounds. The two dispossessed nuns were Eleanor Graunt, an old woman who had been prioress since around 1521, and a young novice. They were not given pensions and what happened to them afterwards is not known. The house then became a private residence.
