= Beverston Castle =

Medieval stone fortress in Beverston, Gloucestershire, England

- Gloucestershire, England
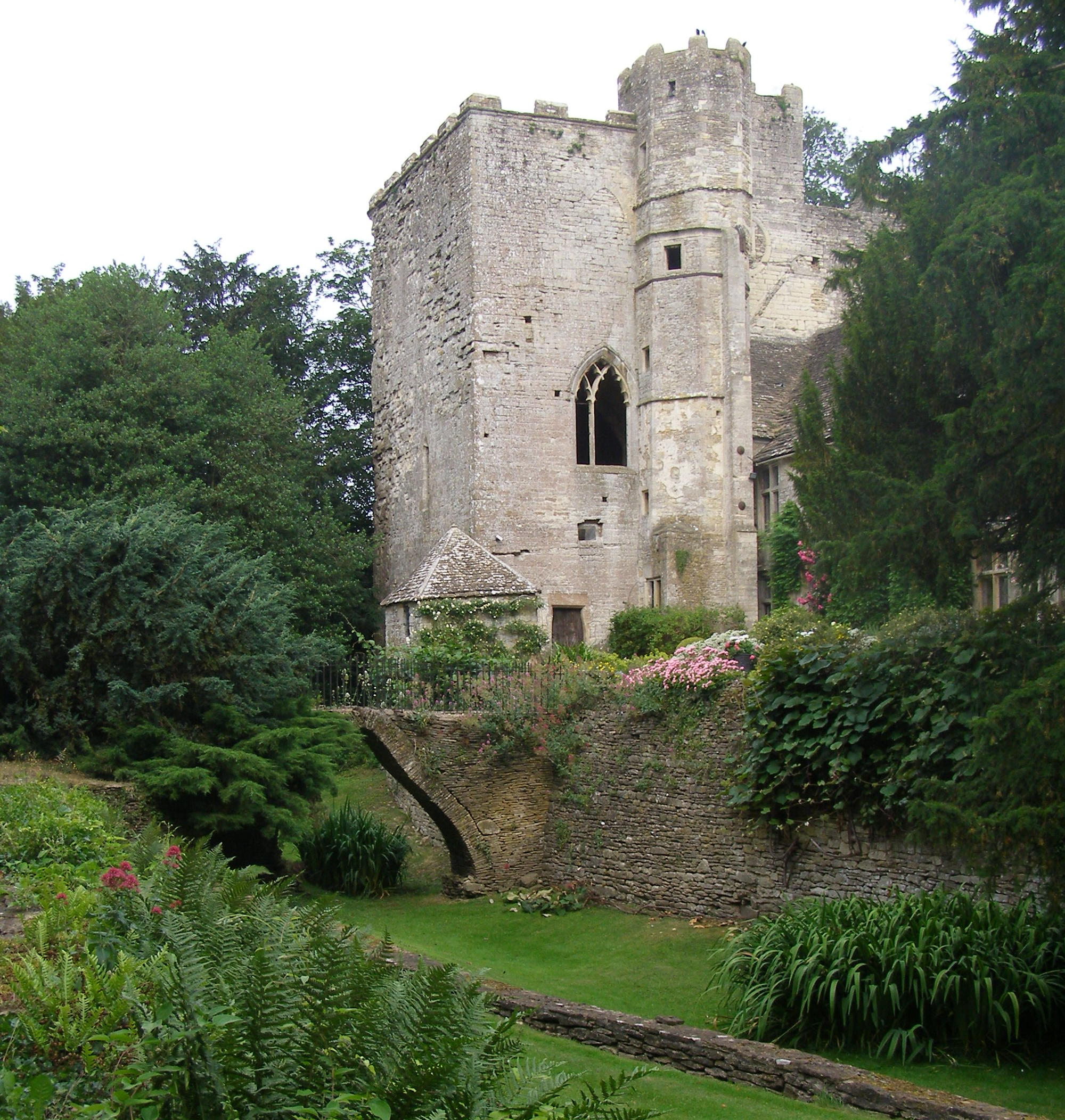
- Beverston Castle south tower of western range

Site information
- Owner: Private
- Open to the public: No
- Condition: Inhabited

Location
- Shown within Gloucestershire
- Location within Gloucestershire
- Coordinates: 51.644239°N 2.201553°W
- Grid reference: grid reference ST861939

Site history
- Materials: Limestone
- Events: English Civil War

Beverston Castle, also known as Beverstone Castle or Tetbury Castle, is a castle in the village of Beverston, Gloucestershire, England. It was constructed as a medieval stone fortress. The property is a mix of manor house, various small buildings, extensive gardens, and the medieval ruins of the fortified building. The castle was founded in 1229 by Maurice de Gaunt.

Much of the castle was in a state of ruin according to a 2019 report, and had been uninhabitable since the 17th century. Several buildings on the 693-acre property, including five cottages and the 17th-century house with seven bedrooms, were in use as residences, however.

== Description ==
The original castle was laid out in pentagonal plan. In the early 14th century, a small quadrangular stronghold was added, along with a twin-towered gatehouse. Beverston Castle is situated approximately three kilometres west of the town of Tetbury and about two kilometres east of the medieval abbey annex, Calcot Manor. The castle is in the Cotswolds, a designated National Landscape.

== History ==
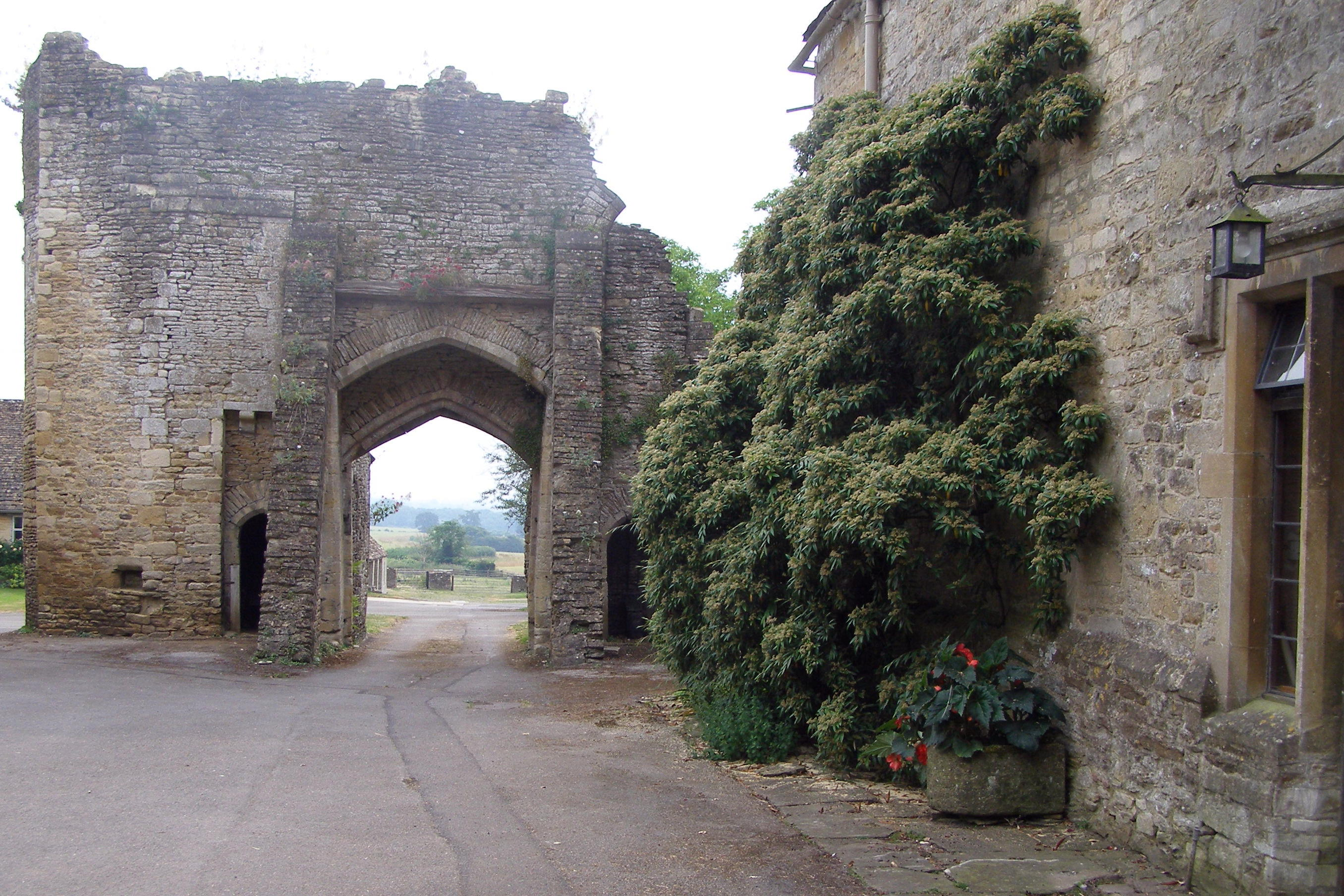
Beverston Castle gatehouse viewed from the inside

Early Roman remains have been found nearby, at Calcot Manor, indicating habitation of this area as early as the 5th century, although it is likely that earlier Iron Age peoples would have also been in this locale. In the Middle Ages it was called Beverstane, and in medieval times the site was known as Beverstone. Another early name for this site was Bureston, derived from the large number of blue stones found here.

The site was the location of an important battle circa 1140 AD between the opposing English armies of King Stephen and Empress Matilda during The Anarchy.

The feudal barony of Beverston was founded by Robert Fitzharding (c. 1095–1170), an Anglo-Saxon nobleman who was also granted the feudal barony of Berkeley in Gloucestershire. He rebuilt Berkeley Castle, and founded the Berkeley family which still occupies it today. He granted his subsidiary barony of Beverston, with its castle, to his third son Robert FitzRobert Fitzharding (d.1194), who adopted the surname "de Gaunt" and who by his second wife Avice had a son and heir Maurice de Gaunt (1184-1230) who died without issue. Whilst Robert Fitzharding, the patriarch of the Berkeley family, founded St Augustine's Abbey in Bristol (now Bristol Cathedral), the de Gaunts founded "The Gaunts' Chapel" (now called "St Mark's Church" or "The Mayor's Chapel") opposite it, across what is today College Green. The crossed-legged effigies supposed to represent Maurice de Gaunt and his father, survive in the Gaunts' Chapel, together with two monuments to later members of the Berkeley family of Stoke Gifford, Gloucestershire (a junior branch descended from Maurice de Berkeley, 2nd Baron Berkeley, 7th feudal baron of Berkeley (1271–1326), Maurice the Magnanimous of Berkeley Castle).

In 1225 Maurice de Gaunt built a fortified manor house at Beverston without a royal licence, and was subsequently granted by the king a licence to crenellate. On 29 July 1229, King Henry III signed a document allowing the castle to stand and remain for ever. Maurice de Gaunt was also known as Maurice de Ghent or de Gant, and as Maurice Paynel; Beverston was called Beverestan in the July 1229 document which was written in Latin. On the death of Maurice de Gaunt in 1230 without issue, his heir to the feudal barony of Beverston was Robert de Gournay (d.1269), the son of his half-sister Eve de Gaunt by her husband Anselm de Gournay. In 1235 the manors of Beverston, Elberton and King's Weston were held by Robert de Gournay, as a tenant-in-chief of the king, for the service of one knight's fee. The last in the male line was John de Gournay (d.1291) who left a daughter and heiress Elizabeth de Gournay. At about this time Beverston passed back to the senior line of the Berkeley family and was granted (with extensive other estates) by Thomas de Berkeley, 3rd Baron Berkeley, 8th feudal baron of Berkeley (1293/6–1361) Thomas the Rich to his 4th son Sir John Berkeley (1352-1428), founder of the Beverston line of that family.

This early castle was fortified by a T-shaped ditch, part of which is still intact in the survival of a partial moat on the south side of the castle. In 1330 the castle was extensively remodeled by Thomas de Berkeley, 3rd Baron Berkeley (Thomas the Rich), who erected a small quadrangular stronghold, with a twin-towered gatehouse. A smaller square tower was added in the late 15th century. At an unspecified later date, an adjoining house was added, using parts of the original structure.

The woollen industry was central to the medieval economy of the Cotswolds, and in 1336, according to former R A Lister and Company employee A S Bullock, 5000 Cotswold sheep were shorn in the courtyard of Beverston Castle, which he thought might have been a record. The castle was remodelled in 1348–1349, the second phase of a renovation that began in the 1330s.

In 1555 Beverston Castle was the residence of Sir John Berkeley and his wife Frances Poyntz, in which year was born their daughter Joanne Berkeley, Abbess of the Convent of the Assumption of Our Blessed Lady in Brussels.

At the end of the 16th century, Sir Michael Hicks (son of Robert Hicks, a merchant of London and Bristol, and Julia Arthur) bought Beverston Castle and passed the Beverston holding to his son Sir William Hicks, 1st Baronet. The estate remained in the Hicks family through to at least the early 19th century. As a result of the English Civil War (mid-seventeenth century), much of Beverston Castle was destroyed. Roundhead forces attacked the castle twice during the War, but the greatest damage was from an order from Parliament to slight its defensive works. The two major attacks occurred in 1644 and in 1691. The western and southern ranges along with the gatehouse with one of its original D-shaped towers have survived.

The property has had continuous occupation since a new residence building was built after the previous house was damaged in a major fire in 1691.

In 1842, the Hicks family sold Beverston Castle to R.S. Holford of Westonbirt. The property was purchased by the Hon Arthur and Mrs Strutt in 1939.

In 1959 the Hon Arthur and Mrs Strutt sold Beverstone Castle to Jane Rook and her husband Laurence, adding further land from Park Farm in 1992. In 2019, after Jane Rook's death, Beverstone Castle was placed on the market.

== Architecture ==
The massive extant west range of Beverston Castle is flanked on its angles with square towers, and it contains a solar above a vaulted undercroft. The pentagon-shaped masonry castle has two surviving, albeit ruined, round towers from the original 13th-century construction of de Gaunt. The dressed bluish limestone appears to be from the same quarry as the stonework of nearby Calcot Manor. The two-storey gatehouse, with one extant D-shaped tower, was added by Lord Berkeley in the 1350–1360 era. The gatehouse arch, totally intact as of 2006, would have originally been protected by an immense portcullis. Above the archway was a sizable first-floor (US = second floor) chamber. The ruined northwest square tower dates to the 14th century (Lord Berkeley's work), further modified in the late 15th century.

The southern domestic range, occupied as of 2006, was built by the Hicks family in the early 17th century, reflecting an age of growing security for large manor houses. This range was originally occupied by a medieval great hall from either the de Gaunt or Berkeley era.

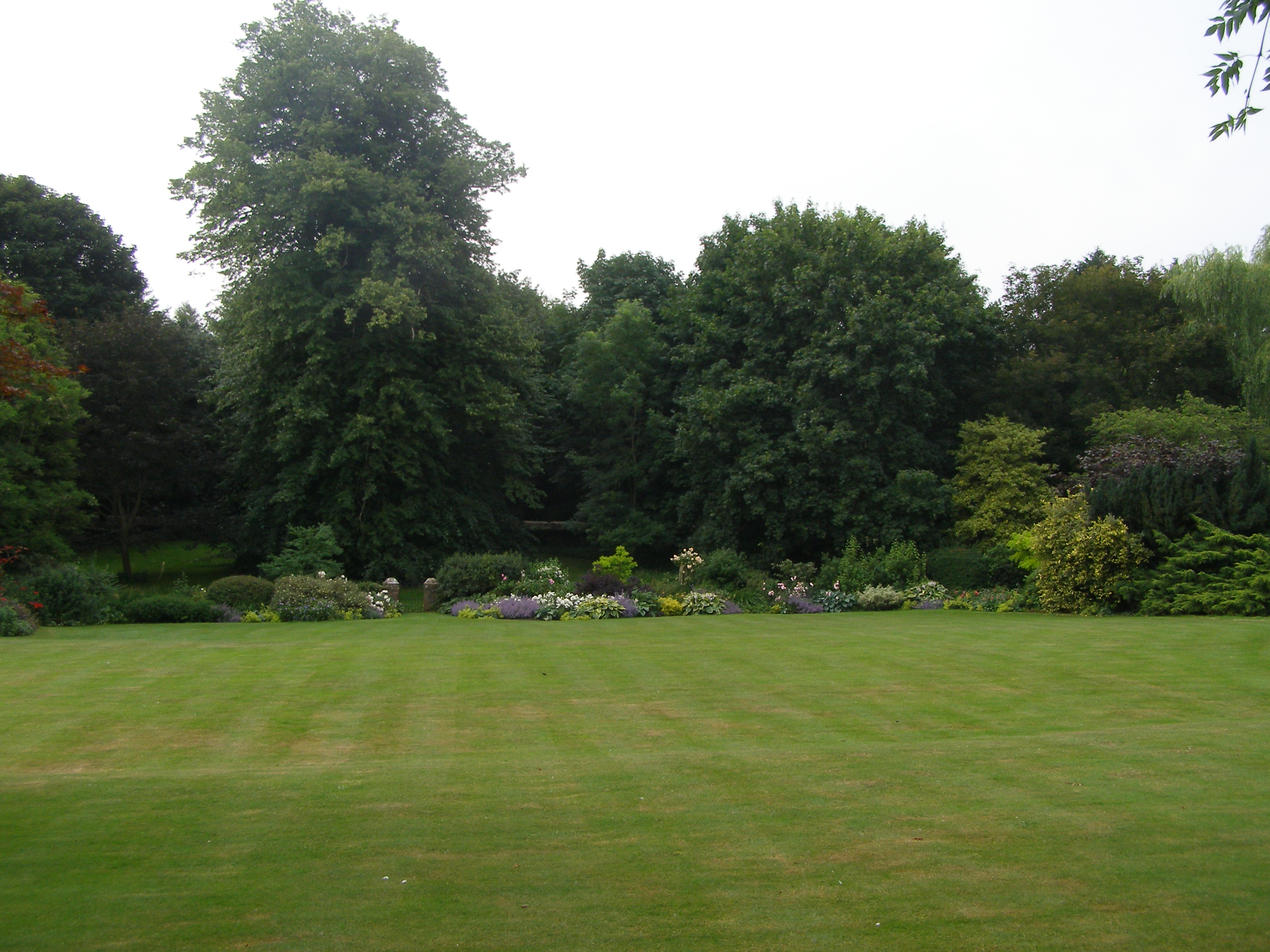
Garden at Beverston Castle looking south

== Developments since 1950 ==
In September 1954, "Beverston Castle, including gazebo and bridge" received Grade I listed status, List Entry Number:1304508. The Gatehouse, by then a free-standing structure, received Grade I listed status in March 1987, List Entry Number:1089720. The bridge, and possibly the gazebo, were built in the 18th century.

The Quadrangular castle at Beverston, also built by Maurice de Gaunt, was first listed as a Scheduled Monument on 9 October 1981 (amended 8 August 1994), List Entry Number:1008620.

A 1974 report provided this information about Beverstone Castle:

The castle includes medieval, post-medieval and modern components and is partially occupied. Some areas of the castle survive largely in their original medieval form, while others are now occupied by more recent structures. Those parts of the castle which survive as upstanding masonry are Listed Grade I. The western wing, which remains unoccupied, constitutes the best surviving section of the original castle. This survives as a three storey building attached to a rectangular corner tower at each end. The southern range is now largely occupied by an 18th century house, built of rubble with a Cotswold stone roof, while in the east the only upstanding remains are those of the gatehouse. The former northern wing has been replaced by modern structures. The monument has a well recorded history of construction. The earliest surviving parts of the castle relate to the fortifications developed by Maurice de Gaunt ...

A 2006 article indicated that Beverston Castle was in private ownership. The ancient moat had been incorporated into the expansive and well-cared-for garden. The gardens are considered a good site for viewing orchids. The southern entrance to the castle was by way of a bridge over the vestigial moat. Vehicle access to the north side of the castle was through the ancient gatehouse arch.

A 2019 report provided more specifics. In 2018, the owner of the estate was Jane Rook (until her death in the spring), who with her husband Laurence, had purchased the property in 1959, from Vice-Admiral the Hon Arthur and Mrs Strutt; they acquired additional land from Park Farm in 1992. The Rooks were strong supporters of the Duke of Beaufort’s Hunt and welcomed many guests, especially during the Badminton Horse Trials week.

While the property was occupied by the Rooks, the gardens were impressive, incorporating parts of the medieval moat, a paved terrace, herbaceous and shrub borders and a walled kitchen garden. They were open to visitors occasionally under the National Gardens Scheme. The castle (ruin) itself was not open to visitors.

After Jane Rook's death, the property was listed for sale in 2019. In addition to the seven bedroom manor house, the 693 acre property included four estate cottages, a flat, an estate office, a large stableyard, a walled kitchen garden and lawns. Many of the contents (80 lots) were listed for sale by auction at Bonhams in October 2018.

== See also ==
- Castles in Great Britain and Ireland
- List of castles in England
- Calcot Manor
