= Beverston =

Village in Gloucestershire, England

Coordinates: 51.64262°N 2.20124°W

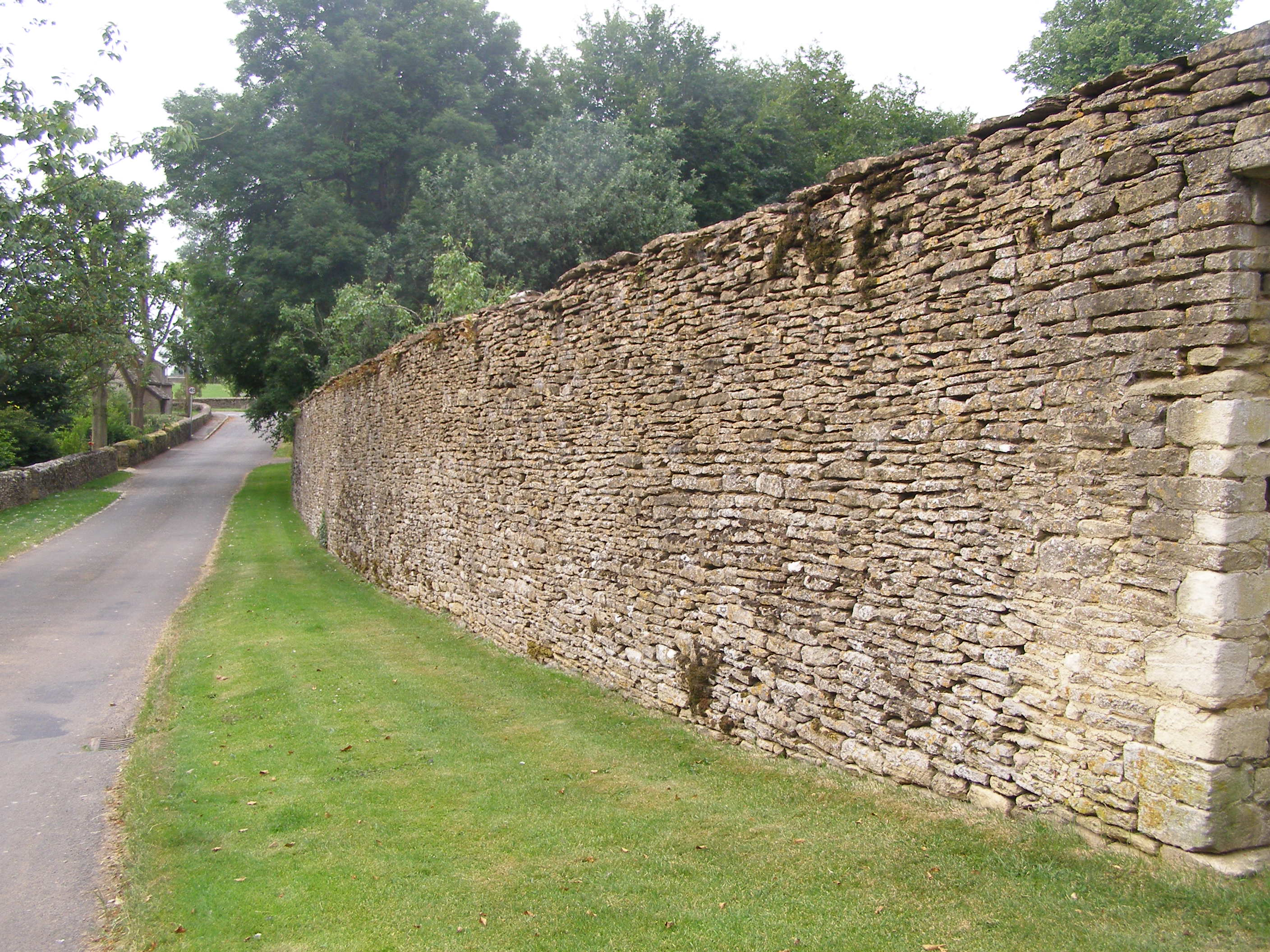
- A portion of the perimeter wall around Beverston Castle looking south toward the A4135 road, Beverston

- Location within Gloucestershire
- Population: 129 (2011 census)
- Civil parish: Beverston
- District: Cotswold
- Shire county: Gloucestershire
- Region: South West
- Country: England
- Sovereign state: United Kingdom
- Police: Gloucestershire
- Fire: Gloucestershire
- Ambulance: South Western

Beverston is a village and civil parish in the Cotswold district of Gloucestershire, England. According to the 2001 census it had a population of 132, decreasing to 129 at the 2011 census. The village is about two miles west of Tetbury. Beverston (also spelled Beverstone) is an example of a typical unaltered Gloucestershire Cotswold village. It is home to Beverston Castle dating to the 12th Century, a Norman Church St Mary's Church, Beverston, and some examples of Cotswold architecture.

== See also ==
- RAF Babdown Farm
