= Harding of Bristol =

Harding of Bristol or Harding Fitz Eadnoth (c. 1048 – c. 1125) was sheriff (reeve) of Bristol, with responsibility for managing a manorial estate and perhaps similar duties to those of a magistrate. He was the son of Eadnoth the Constable, an Anglo-Saxon thane who served as steward to Edward the Confessor and Harold II. He was the father of Robert Fitzharding who became lord of Berkeley, Gloucestershire.

His wife Livida supposedly died at the manor of Whetonhurst, Blacklow Hundred, Gloucestershire, England in 1101.
