= Robert Fitzharding =

Anglo-Saxon nobleman

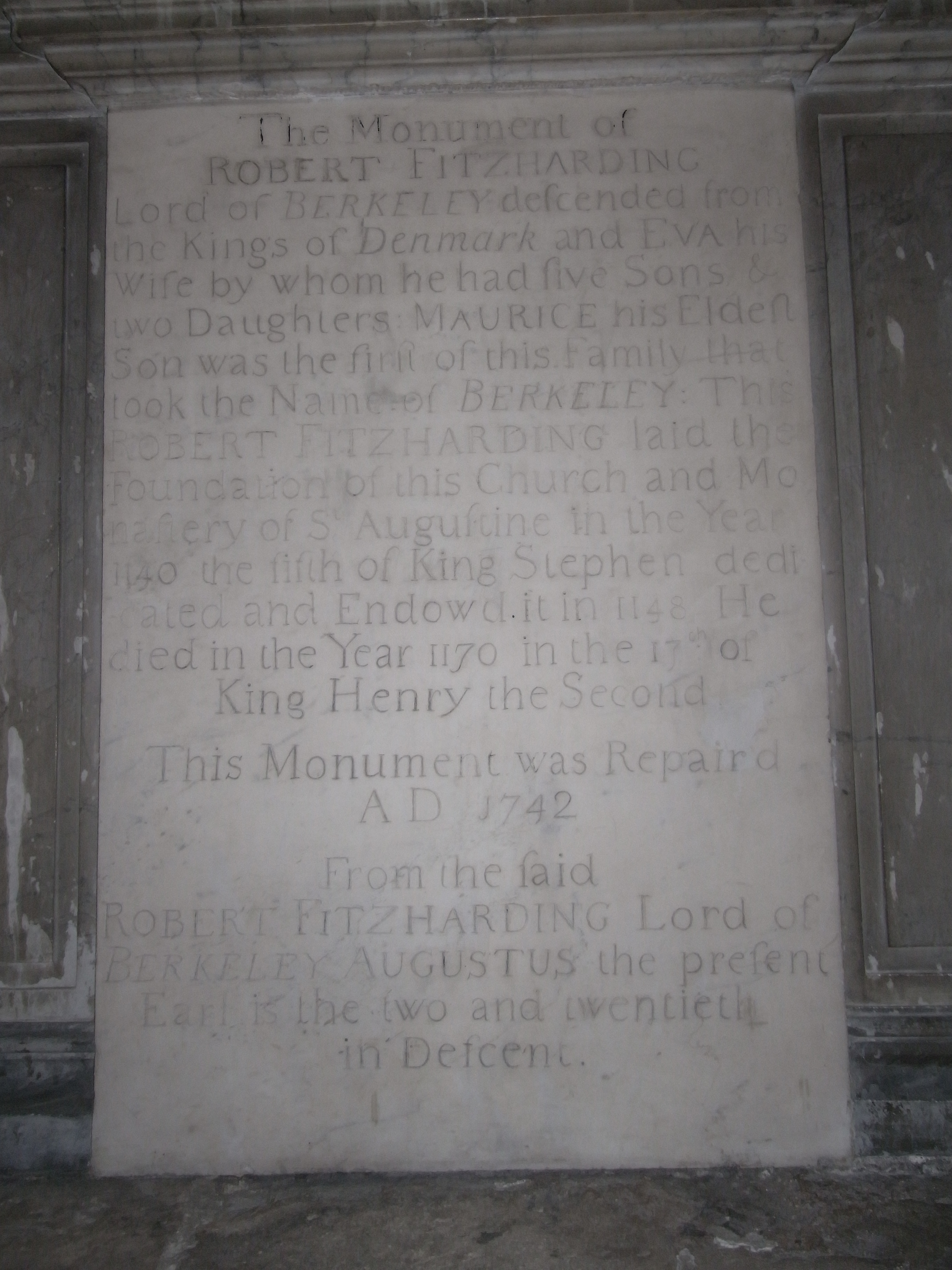
Marble mural monumental tablet erected 1742 to Robert FitzHarding in the Lady Chapel, St Augustine's Abbey (Bristol Cathedral).

Robert Fitzharding (c. 1095–1170) was an Anglo-Saxon nobleman from Bristol who was granted the feudal barony of Berkeley in Gloucestershire. He rebuilt Berkeley Castle, and founded the Berkeley family which still occupies it today. He was a wealthy Bristol merchant and a financier of the future King Henry II of England (1133–1189) in the period known as the Anarchy during which Henry's mother, the Empress Matilda (1102–1167), mounted repeated military challenges to King Stephen (d. 1154). Fitzharding founded St. Augustine's Abbey, which after the Reformation became Bristol Cathedral. Many members of the Berkeley family were buried within it, and some of their effigies survive there. As J. Horace Round asserted, he was one of the very few Anglo-Saxon noblemen who managed to retain their noble status in Norman England and successfully integrate with the Norman nobility, if not the only one.

== Early life ==
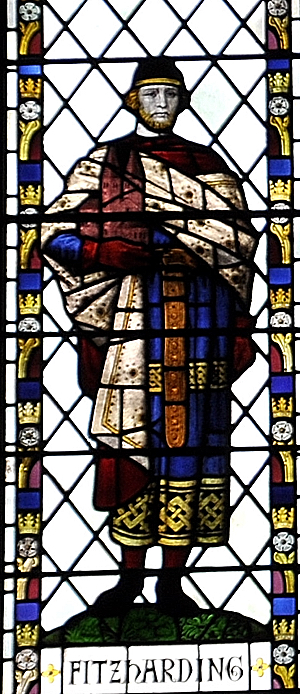
Robert Fitzharding

Robert Fitzharding is believed to have been the grandson of Eadnoth, who had held the post of Staller under King Edward the Confessor and King Harold. Robert's father Harding of Bristol was the King's Reeve in Bristol, with a house in Baldwin Street. Robert later built a large house in Broad Street, on the River Frome. He became a burgess of the city and sufficiently wealthy to buy from Robert, 1st Earl of Gloucester extensive manorial lands around Bristol to its south and west, including Redcliffe, Bedminster, Leigh, Portbury and Billeswick.

== St Augustine's Abbey ==
In 1140, Fitzharding founded St Augustine's Abbey as a Victorine Augustinian monastery. The chosen site was in Billeswick, just across the River Frome from Bristol Castle. He endowed the abbey with many lands, and the rights to revenues from many churches, in Bristol and within several counties. In 1148 he chose Richard of Warwick as the first abbot. In 1155 King Henry II made endowments to the abbey and in 1159 Fitzharding confirmed his own endowments by charter. The abbey carried out a building programme during Fitzharding's lifetime which created a new abbey church, the chapter house and the Great Gatehouse.

== Barony of Berkeley ==
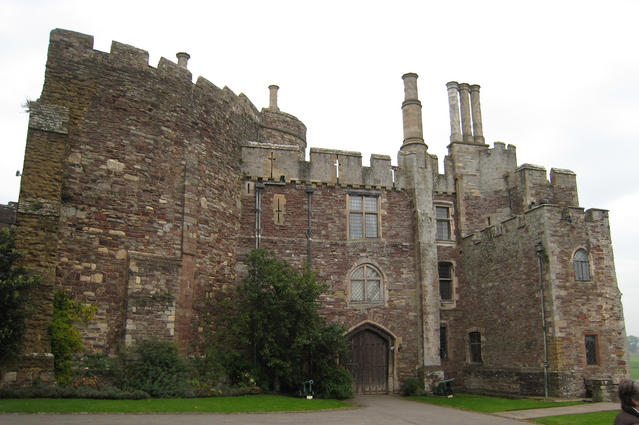
Berkeley Castle

In the conflict of the Anarchy, Bristol Castle was held by Robert, 1st Earl of Gloucester for the Plantagenet cause against King Stephen. In 1152 Roger de Berkeley was dispossessed by Plantagenet forces of the fee-farm of Berkeley Castle, held from King Stephen, for refusing to give allegiance to the Plantagenet cause. These lands included Berkeley, Filton, Horfield, Almondsbury and Ashleworth, and other English and Welsh possessions including land in Gwent and Glamorgan. This left Roger de Berkeley with a truncated barony centred on Dursley. Following the victory and crowning of King Henry II, Fitzharding was rewarded by the king for his support with the grant of a feudal barony which comprised lands which had formerly been held at fee-farm from Stephen by Roger de Berkeley, including Berkeley Castle itself, which became the caput of the new barony. Fitzharding made further endowments to St Augustine's Abbey from these territories.

In 1153–54 Fitzharding received a royal charter from Henry II giving him permission to rebuild the castle at Berkeley. The previous castle was originally a motte-and-bailey built by William FitzOsbern shortly after the Norman Conquest of 1066, and had been rebuilt in the 12th century by the dispossessed Roger de Berkeley and his father. Fitzharding built the shell keep between 1153 and 1156, on the site of the former motte. The building of the curtain wall followed, around 1160–90.

== Later life ==
According to the 13th-century Norman verse The Song of Dermot and the Earl, Fitzharding acted as an intermediary between Dermot MacMurrough, the exiled King of Leinster, and Henry II in Dermot's attempts to raise Norman support for his planned recapture of Leinster. The song tells that Dermot was a guest in Fitzharding's house in Bristol.

Sometime before his death Fitzharding became a canon of the abbey he had founded. He died in 1170.

Robert Fitzharding also owned a property in Gloucestershire where Beverston Castle (completed in 1229) would later be built by his grandson, Marice de Gaunt.

The ancestry of Robert Fitzharding's wife Eva is not certain. She was the founder and first abbess of the Augustinian nunnery of St Mary Magdalen on St Michael's Hill, Bristol, having endowed it with lands in Southmead.

Eva was buried alongside her husband in the choir of St Augustine's Abbey. They are commemorated with a 19th-century stained glass window in the cathedral, depicting them with Henry II.

== Descendants ==
Robert's first son, and heir, was Maurice fitzRobert fitzHarding, also known as Maurice de Berkeley, born c. 1120. Duke Henry of Aquitaine (the future Henry II) had clearly regretted the effect of his action in dispossessing Roger de Berkeley of his former lands, and determined to facilitate the junction of the two families by encouraging dual intermarriages. In 1153–54 Maurice married Alice, the first daughter of the dispossessed Roger de Berkeley, who was now a feudal baron of nearby Dursley. At the same time Robert's first daughter Helen married Roger's heir, also called Roger. This double marriage contract, binding the son and heir of each man to marry a daughter of the other, was signed at the house of Robert FitzHarding in Bristol in the presence of Duke Henry and 16 witnesses.
