= Ronald Gustave Kellett =

World War II fighter commander, ace and founder of 303 Squadron

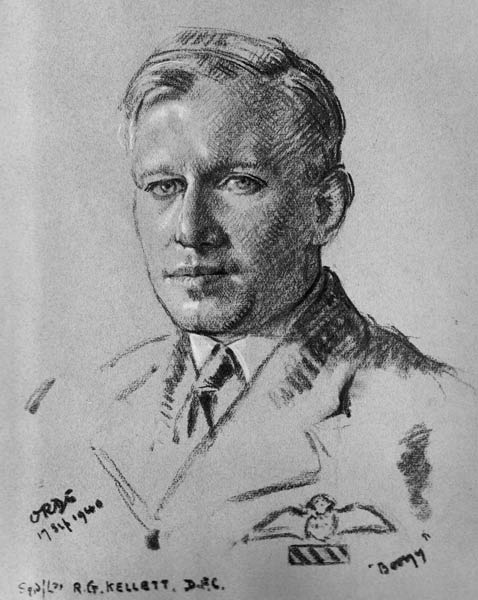
- Portrait of Kellett, made by the war artist Cuthbert Orde in September 1940
- Born: 13 September 1909; Eldon, County Durham, England
- Died: 12 November 1998 (aged 89); Kent, England
- Burial place: St George's Church, Benenden, England
- Military career
- Allegiance: United Kingdom
- Branch: Royal Air Force
- Service years: 1933–1953
- Rank: Wing Commander
- Commands: No. 615 Squadron (1946–48); RAF North Weald (1941); No. 96 Squadron (1940–41); No. 303 Squadron (1940)
- Conflicts: Second World War: Battle of Britain
- Awards: Distinguished Service Order; Distinguished Flying Cross; Air Efficiency Award; Mentioned in Despatches; Silver Cross of the Virtuti Militari (Poland)

Ronald Kellett, DSO, DFC, AE (13 September 1909 – 12 November 1998) was a British flying ace of the Royal Air Force (RAF) during the Second World War. He led No. 303 Squadron during the Battle of Britain and is credited with the destruction of at least five aircraft.

From County Durham, Kellett worked in London for the stock broking firm of Laurence Keen and Gardner when he joined the Auxiliary Air Force in 1933. He served with No. 600 (City of London) Squadron for the next six years, rising to the rank of flight lieutenant before being transferred to No. 616 Squadron. He was called up for full-time service in the RAF a week prior to the outbreak of the Second World War. He served with No. 616 Squadron and then No. 249 Squadron for several months before, in July 1940, being appointed to command of No. 303 Squadron. This was a Polish unit of the RAF. After a period of training, the squadron became officially operational at the end of August and over the next six weeks achieved significant successes against the Luftwaffe. Kellett's personal successes as a fighter pilot and his leadership of No. 303 Squadron were recognised with awards of the Distinguished Flying Cross, the Distinguished Service Order and the Polish Silver Cross of the Virtuti Militari. Kellett was posted to command of No. 96 Squadron towards the end of the year. After a period as wing leader at RAF North Weald in 1941, he spent most of the remainder of the war in staff and teaching positions. Returning to civilian life in 1945, Kellett resumed his career as a stockbroker although for a two-year period commanded a squadron in the Royal Auxiliary Air Force. He also took up farming. He retired to Kent in 1973, setting up a vineyard with one of his brothers. He died in 1998, aged 89.

== Early life ==
Ronald Gustave Kellett was born in Eldon, County Durham, on 13 September 1909. He was one of five sons of Matthew Henry Kellett, a mining industrialist, and his wife Louise, who was French. Educated at Rossall School, his family was wealthy and often holidayed in Switzerland and France. After school he worked as a post boy at the Liverpool Stock Exchange before moving to London when he was aged 18 to join the stockbroking firm of Laurence Keen and Gardner.

In 1931 Kellett unsuccessfully campaigned as the National Conservative party candidate for the Chester-le-Street seat in parliament. Two years later he joined the Auxiliary Air Force (AAF) as a pilot officer. He flew part-time with No. 600 (City of London) Squadron, which was based at Hendon and operated Westland Wapiti light bombers, while continuing his work as a stockbroker. In September 1935 he was promoted to flying officer. He subsequently became a flight commander in the squadron, receiving a promotion to flight lieutenant in July 1938.

In January 1939 Kellett was transferred to the AAF's No. 616 Squadron, where he was one of its flight commanders. The squadron, which had only been formed late the previous year, was based at Doncaster and operated Hawker Hind light bombers although it later received Gloster Gauntlet fighters when it transferred to Fighter Command. Later in the year, Kellett married Daphne, the daughter of a surgeon.

== Second World War ==
No. 616 Squadron was attending a summer camp at Manston when, on 24 August, all AAF personnel were called up for active service in the Royal Air Force (RAF). The squadron returned to Doncaster to be placed on a war footing. Following the outbreak of the Second World War, it moved to Leconfield and began to take on Supermarine Spitfire fighters. By February 1940, it was carrying out patrols along the East Coast. In May, Kellett was posted to the newly formed No. 249 Squadron as one of its flight commanders. Like his previous unit, it was based at Leconfield but was training on Hawker Hurricane fighters.

=== Battle of Britain ===
In July, having been promoted to temporary squadron leader the previous month, Kellett was posted to command of No. 303 Squadron. This unit, also known as "Kościuszko Squadron", was the second Polish fighter squadron to be formed in the RAF. It was based at Northolt, under the control of No. 11 Group but at the time of Kellett's arrival, only consisted of a few RAF personnel for key administrative posts. The squadron officially came into being on 2 August when the Polish pilots arrived at Northolt. Many of them could speak little or no English although all could converse in French. Kellett believed his own proficiency in French was a factor in his appointment to the squadron. There were issues around payment of the salaries of the Polish pilots; Kellett covered these at his own expense until the Poles were officially entered on the RAF's payroll.

While Kellett was the official commander, he had a nominal equivalent among the Polish pilots; this was Zdzisław Krasnodębski. Equipped with the Hawker Hurricane fighter, No. 303 Squadron commenced intensive training under Kellett's supervision. The pilots, most of whom were vastly experienced having flown against the Germans during the campaigns in Poland and later in France, had to familiarise themselves with the Hurricane, and learn English and RAF fighter tactics before the squadron was allowed to become operational. The time required for this was the source of tension between the Poles, eager to fight, and Kellett and his flight commanders, with Krasnodębski urging to have the squadron made operational. On 30 August Kellett was leading the squadron on a training mission involving practice interceptions of some Bristol Blenheim light bombers when in the distance, German bombers were sighted by Ludwik Paszkiewicz, one of the Polish pilots. Kellett, wanting to stay with the Blenheims as protection ignored Paszkiewicz's efforts to attract his attention. Eventually, Paszkiewicz flew off in pursuit of the Germans and shot down a fighter. On hearing of his success, rather than discipline Paszkiewicz, Kellett requested No. 303 Squadron have operational status. This was granted the next day, and the squadron was immediately drawn into the aerial fighting over the southeast of England.

In the evening of 31 August, the squadron made its first sortie, a scramble to intercept a Luftwaffe raid on the airfield at Biggin Hill. During the resulting engagement, Kellett shot down a Messerschmitt Bf 109 fighter to the east of Biggin Hill. His victory was one of six achieved by the squadron's pilots in their first sortie. The chief of the Air Staff, Sir Cyril Newall, sent a congratulatory message to the squadron to recognise their successes. Kellett destroyed another Bf 109 near Thameshaven on 5 September with a second deemed to have been probably destroyed. The next day, he destroyed a Dornier Do 17 medium bomber over Sevenoaks. However he was lightly wounded in the engagement and made a forced landing in his badly damaged Hurricane at Biggin Hill. He had to be cut out of the aircraft as its canopy was jammed and was treated for legs wounds at Farnborough Hospital.

While the squadron's reported successes during its first week of operations were widely reported and received much public acclaim, they were initially treated with some skepticism by RAF officials. Even despite Kellett's defence of his reporting of the aerial victories claimed by his charges, one skeptic was the station commander at Northolt, Group Captain Stanley Vincent. However, he was convinced of the merit of their claims after observing the Polish in action firsthand when he accompanied the squadron on a sortie on 11 September. On Battle of Britain Day, 15 September, No. 303 Squadron was scrambled twice and during the course of the day, Kellett shot down a Messerschmitt Bf 110 heavy fighter and probably destroyed a Do 17, both near Gravesend. The squadron was credited with the destruction of 16 aircraft during their two scrambles of the day.

Kellett shot down a Bf 109 over Portsmouth on 26 September. Earlier in the day, King George VI had visited the squadron to personally thank the Polish pilots and ground crew for their efforts. At the start of October and in recognition of his leadership of No. 303 Squadron over the preceding weeks, Kellett was awarded the Distinguished Flying Cross. The citation, published in The London Gazette, read:

By his excellent example and personality this officer had been largely responsible for the success of his squadron which in one week destroyed thirty-three enemy aircraft, of which Squadron Leader Kellett had destroyed three. His leadership and determination in attacking superior numbers of enemy aircraft have instilled the greatest confidence in other pilots of his squadron.

— London Gazette, No. 34958, 1 October 1940

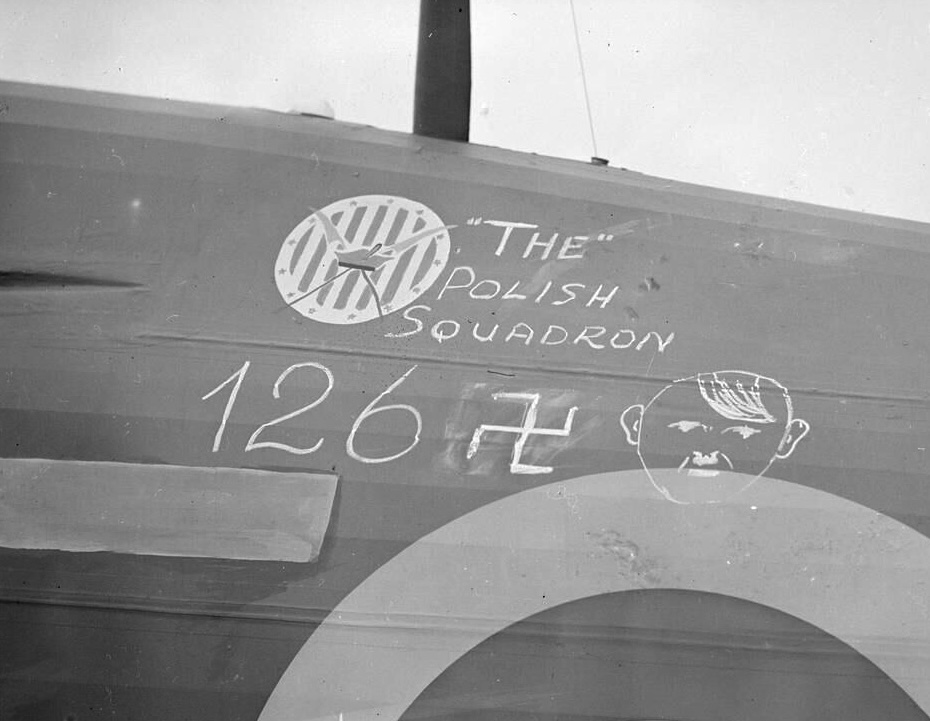
While under Kellett's command during the Battle of Britain, No. 303 Squadron claimed 126 aircraft destroyed, as represented in the markings applied to one of its Hurricanes

On 5 October Kellett damaged a Bf 109 near Rochester; this would be his final claim of the war. On 11 October, No. 303 Squadron, at the time credited with destroying 126 aircraft since it had become operational, was withdrawn from No. 11 Group for a rest and sent to Leconfield. It was the most successful fighter squadron of the Battle of Britain. Kellett was duly awarded the Distinguished Service Order. The published citation read:

Squadron Leader Kellett as commander of his squadron has built up and trained his personnel to such a fine fighting pitch that no fewer than 113 enemy aircraft have been destroyed in the space of one-month, with very few casualties sustained by his squadron. He has frequently led the wing formation with judgement and success. The gallantry and fine leadership displayed by Squadron Leader Kellett have proved an inspiring example.

— London Gazette, No. 34978, 25 October 1940

Not long afterwards, Kellett departed for another posting. By this time he thought highly of the Polish pilots and believed that they played an important role in the survival of the RAF during the Battle of Britain. He also attributed his own survival, and that of John Kent and Athol Forbes, the flight commanders at No. 303 Squadron, to the protective efforts of the Poles while in the air, writing "...it is greatly to the credit of the Polish airman that the three English pilots who commanded the Squadron and flights survived the Battle."

=== Later war service ===
In December Kellett posted to Cranage, in Cheshire, to form and command No. 96 Squadron. This operated Hurricanes in a night-fighter role and was tasked with the defence of Liverpool. Kellett was mentioned in despatches in the 1941 New Year Honours. In March he was given command of the fighter wing at North Weald, which he led for three months until being appointed to the Air Ministry as a staff officer, working in fighter pilot training. He was promoted to temporary wing commander in December. Earlier in the year, Kellett, along with John Kent and Athol Forbes, the flight commanders of No. 303 Squadron during the Battle of Britain, had been awarded the Silver Cross of the Virtuti Militari by the Polish government-in-exile. The trio were presented with their medals in October by General Władysław Sikorski, the prime minister of the exiled Polish government. Following the investiture, the personnel of No. 303 Squadron celebrated this honour by taking their former commanders out to dinner in London.

At the end of 1942, Kellett was sent to the Staff College for a training course. In June 1943 he was sent to Ankara in Turkey, where he taught at the Turkish Air Force staff college. By this time he had been a serving member of the AAF for over ten years and was a recipient of the Air Efficiency Award and clasp. He returned to the United Kingdom at the end of the war to be demobilised. He was credited with the destruction of five aircraft, with two more probably destroyed. He also damaged one aircraft.

== Later life ==
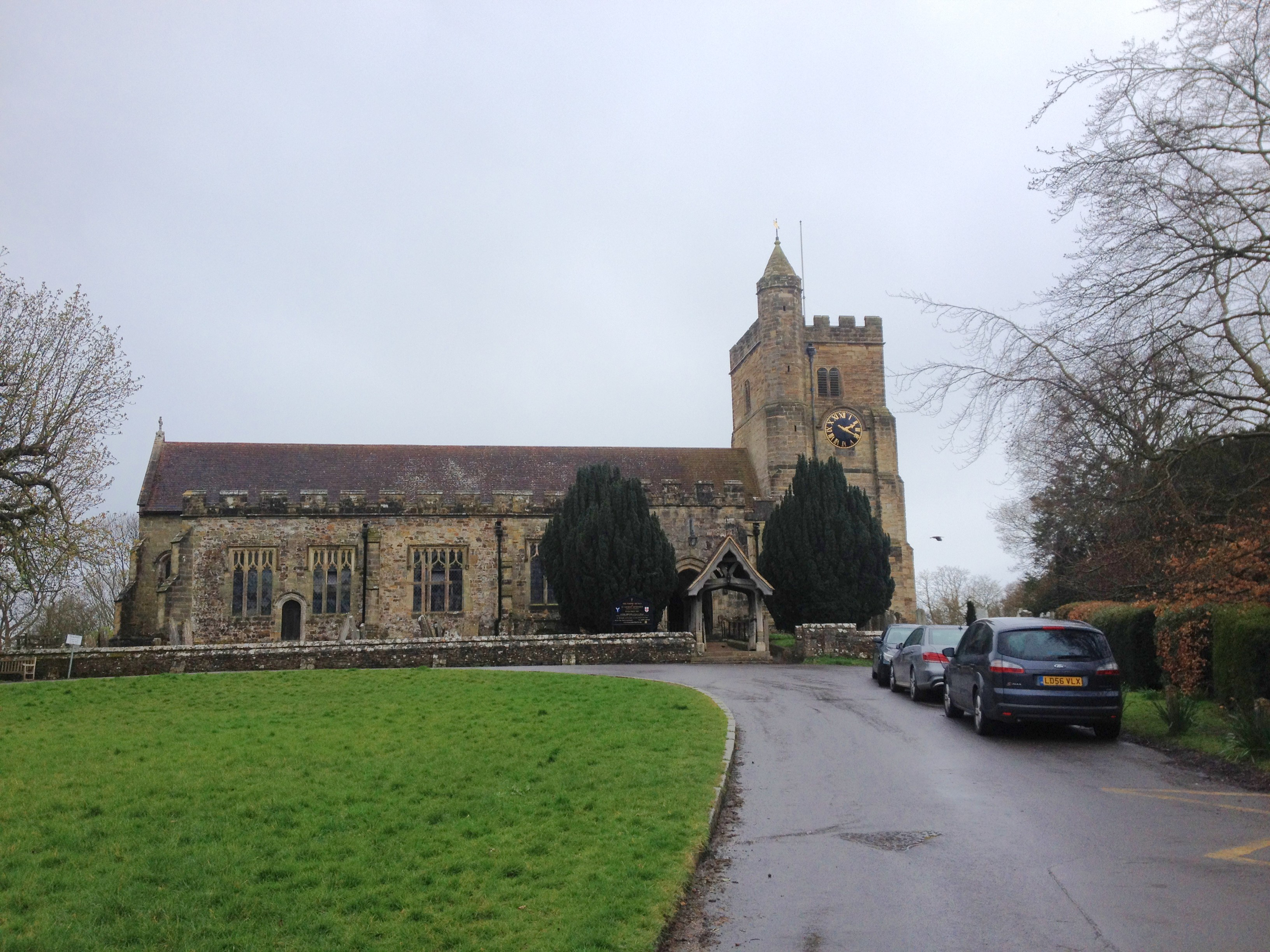
Kellett is buried at St George's Church in Benenden, Kent

Kellett returned to his work in the London Stock Exchange with Laurence, Keen and Gardner where he remained until he retired, aged 64. He rejoined the Royal Auxiliary Air Force (RAAF) when it was reconstituted in June 1946 and a few weeks later was given command of No. 615 Squadron, which was equipped with Spitfires and based at Biggin Hill. He remained in command until 1 October 1948 at which time he was placed on the reserve list. He relinquished his commission in the RAAF on 1 October 1953.

In addition to his career as a stockbroker, from 1949 Kellett farmed in Kent. He enjoyed the country pursuits of hunting, shooting as well as sailing. In 1973 he, along with his brother Alfred, planted a small vineyard, which produced wine until it was destroyed in the storms of 1987. Kellett died at the age of 89 in Kent on 12 November 1998. His wife Daphne, with whom he had two sons and three daughter, had predeceased him in 1994. Kellett and his wife are buried together in the cemetery at St George's Church at Benenden in Kent. In the church itself, there is a memorial to Kellett and No. 303 Squadron.
