= Iden Green =

Village in Kent, England

Coordinates: 51.1073°N 0.5634°E

- Location within Kent
- OS grid reference: TQ795373
- District: Tunbridge Wells
- Shire county: Kent
- Region: South East
- Country: England
- Sovereign state: United Kingdom
- Post town: CRANBROOK
- Postcode district: TN17
- Dialling code: 01580
- Police: Kent
- Fire: Kent
- Ambulance: South East Coast
- UK Parliament: Weald of Kent

Iden Green is a small village, near Benenden, in the county of Kent. It belongs to the civil parish of Benenden and the Tunbridge Wells Borough District of Kent, in the South East of England.

In Old English 'Iden' refers to a 'pasture by the yew trees' (from ig 'yew' + denn 'pasture'). Hence the village's name means 'a pasture of green by the yew trees'.

The village of Iden Green should not be confused with the nearby hamlet named Iden Green between Goudhurst and Cranbrook.

== History ==
The discovery of various fragments of Iron Age pottery, struck flint flakes and iron slag, indicate that some areas of the parish were settled during the Iron Age, perhaps as early as 1500 BC.

Iden Green's main street, Mill Street, was a Roman Road that connected Hastings to Maidstone, so the village began its main growth along a 'Roman thoroughfare' centred around the existing farmsteads of Eaglesden, Iden Green Farm and Yew Tree Farm; which had organically nestled themselves into the Wealden landscape with their far reaching views of the rolling valleys. However, the village expanded to its greatest extent during the 16th century, as part of Cranbrook's thriving Wealden cloth industry, as is clearly evidenced by the numerous workmen's cottages that sprung up in the village during that time, many of which still exist today.

The manor of Benenden, which included Iden Green, was given by William the Conqueror to his brother Odo the Bishop of Baieux in 1067 and the manor is one of the few parish's in the Weald included in the Doomsday Book of 1086, by name.

A paved ford built in Roman times still exists in Iden Green, having been discovered during excavations in 1935. It was common around AD43 for the Romans to pave fords in Britain to allow easy access by pedestrians, horses and carts. The Paved Ford in Iden Green is protected by the Ancient Monuments and Archaeological Areas Act 1979 as being of national and historic importance.

The first Ordnance Survey map of the area, surveyed 1870–1871 and published in 1887, details that the village centred around four main farms; the largest being Eaglesden manor, its oast, workers cottages and its farm, in the south of the village, in addition to Iden Green Farm to the east (along Weavers Lane), Yew Tree Farm which occupied the centre of the current village and Framefarm in the northern area. Other houses mentioned in this first Ordnance Survey of the area include Thorne Charity House (near the site of the current tennis club), Smithey (near the site of the monument on the corner of Standen Street) and Albion Cottage.

Hemsted Park was granted to the Guldefords in 1388 and the family became a large part of the history of the parish for over 300 years. Richard Guldeford's official title was 'Richard Guildford of Hemsted in Benenden and Halden in Rolvenden' and he fought alongside Henry VII when he gained the Crown at Bosworth Field in 1485. Hemsted became a great house with a hunting park and was visited by Queen Elizabeth I, hosting her for over 3 nights in 1573.

In 1702, Hemsted was sold to the Admiral of the Fleet, Sir John (Foulweather Jack) Norris. The house itself was modernised during and after Sir John's ownership. His grandson, John Norris, came to live there with his wife, Kitty Fisher. She is famed in a nursery rhyme as the one who found Lucy Locket's pocket (she lived at Babb's Farm) and was 'buried in her best ball-gown' in Benenden churchyard.

Commemorative wells were built in the parish to celebrate Queen Victoria's Golden Jubilee in 1887 in Benenden, and the Diamond Jubilee in 1897 in Iden Green.

Lord Rothermere bought Hemsted in 1912 and during 1923–24 the estate was dispersed. Benenden School bought Hemsted House and park and the farms were sold at auction in Maidstone. Symbolic of the end of an era was the felling of the great Hemsted Oak in New Pond Road, 'probably the finest specimen of an oak in the South of England'. The trunk, weighing eight tons, went to the Wembley Exhibition of 1924.

Lord Rothermere became a great benefactor to the parish of Benenden and Iden Green, giving to Benenden, the St George's Club, War Memorial, and recreation ground (where the village hall now stands) and giving to Iden Green, two allotment fields and the Iden Green recreation ground and Pavilion. In addition, he set up a trust fund for their maintenance which still exists today, almost 100 years later.

The current Lord Rothermere, Jonathan Harmsworth - the 4th Viscount Rothermere, is the owner of Associated Newspapers, publishers of the Daily Mail, Mail On Sunday and Metro. On 6 March 2016, HRH Princess Anne The Princess Royal, an ex-pupil of Benenden School for Girls, visited Iden Green to open six new homes on Standen Street as part of Kent's affordable housing scheme. This was in addition to the six houses built in 1994. The land had been gifted to the Tunbridge Wells Borough Council by Viscount Rothermere.

== Governance ==
The village is part of the Borough of Tunbridge Wells and is represented in Parliament by Katie Lam, Conservative MP for Weald of Kent.

== Geography ==
The village is located amongst low-lying hills known as The Weald, which is situated between the North and South Downs and resting within the north eastern sector of the High Weald Area of Outstanding Natural Beauty. Iden Green is situated between four small towns; Staplehurst to the north, Tenterden to the east, Hawkhurst to the south and the nearest town of Cranbrook to the west.

The geology of the High Weald consists largely of a series of hard sandstone strata, underlain by heavy clays, giving rise to a combination which occurs across the Weald of sandstone ridges and clay vales. Combined with faulting and watercourses cutting into the rock sequences, this has led to the smooth rolling uplands, plateaus and ridgelines, strongly incised by deep stream valleys (ghylls).

== Demography ==
The 1986 Census of the United Kingdom detailed that Iden Green had a population of 380, with it being largely a village of young families. There were 132 children under 18, 160 adults and 88 elderly residents.

== Economy ==
The Woodcock Inn is the only pub in Iden Green itself and is a 17th-century traditional public house with an enclosed beer garden, located off Standen Street.

== Culture and community ==
The Iden Green recreational park contains a young children's playground and is used for village activities, such as fetes with live music and games of rounders.

== Landmarks ==
The Iden Green Pavilion has a capacity of 70 and today serves as a village hall for the local village community. Between 1945 and 1954 the Pavilion served as the village church following the doodlebug bomb damage to the village's chapel on Chapel Street (behind the tennis club). The building of the new Congregational Church on New Pond Road in 1954 returned use of the Pavilion to a village hall.

== Transport ==
The nearest railway stations are Staplehurst to the north, and Etchingham to the southwest. The A229 road lies 5 km to the west and runs north–south between Maidstone and Hurst Green. Further west (approximately 10 km), the A21 runs north–south and stretches between London and Hastings.

== Education ==
The nearest primary schools are in Benenden and Sandhurst.

== Religious sites ==
Iden Green Congregational Church is an evangelical church. The current brick building was completed in 1954, with extensions built in 1999 and 2013. This new building on New Pond Road replaced the World War II bomb-damaged chapel on Chapel Lane (to the rear of the tennis club) which was of a simple weatherboarded construction (originally constructed in 1837 by Mr Thomas Avery).

== Sport ==
To the rear of the village green is the Iden Green Tennis Club, which contains two outdoor courts and a clubhouse.

== Notable people ==
People of note who have lived in Iden Green include:

- William Robert Fountains Addison VC, (1883–1962), recipient of the Victoria Cross in the First World War
- Boyd Alexander, (1873–1910), British Army officer, explorer and ornithologist
- Alfred Cohen, (1920–2011), American artist
- Giles Cooper OBE, (born 1968), entertainment producer and promoter, best known as chairman of the annual Royal Variety Performance
- Louise Dean, (born 1971), novelist
- William Huntington, (1745–1813), preacher
- Brian Moore, (1932–2001), football commentator and television presenter
- Arthur Tooth, (1839–1931), Church of England priest imprisoned under the Public Worship Regulation Act 1874
- Thomas Webster, (1800–1886), painter of genre scenes of school and village life

== See also ==
- Cranbrook, Kent
