= Benenden School =

Girls' school in Benenden near Tunbridge Wells, Kent, England

Coordinates: 51°4′31″N 0°34′19″E

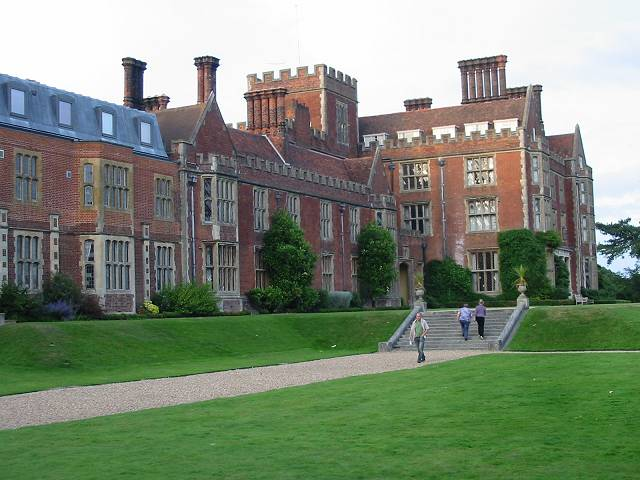

Location
- Cranbrook Road; Benenden, Kent, TN17 4AA; England

Information
- Type: Private boarding school
- Motto: A Complete Education
- Established: 1923; 103 years ago
- Department for Education URN: 118939 Tables
- Headmistress: Rachel Bailey
- Gender: Girls
- Age: 11 to 18
- Enrolment: 550
- Houses: Echyngham, Guldeford, Hemsted, Marshall, Medway, Norris, Beeches, Elms, Limes and Oaks
- Colour: Blue
- Alumnae: Benenden Seniors
- Website: http://www.benenden.school

Benenden School is a private boarding school for girls in Kent, England, in Hemsted Park at Benenden, between Cranbrook and Tenterden. Benenden has a boarding population of over 550 girls aged 11 to 18, as well as a limited number of day student spaces.

It was the inspiration for the Malory Towers book series.

== Facilities ==
The school occupies a Victorian country house set in 250 acres (100 hectares) of gardens and woodland in the Weald of Kent. Living, learning, sporting, and leisure facilities are clustered around the original 19th-century main house. There have been, and continue to be, many improvements to the site. There is a sports centre (known as "SPLASH"), a humanities building ("Leelands"), a design technology centre, a study centre (Clarke Centre) and a theatre and drama teaching complex, completed in 2007 at the cost of £2.3 million. The study centre includes the Eugenia Leung Library and classrooms. A new science centre, one of the most advanced centres of scientific learning available in the independent sector, was opened by the Princess Royal on 10 October 2012. The school's most recent enhancements have been the construction of an all-weather sports pitch and pavilion in September 2016 and the Centenary Hall, an 800-seater multi-purpose space that has established one of the foremost concert hall in the South East of England. This opened in Autumn 2022. The School celebrated its Centenary in 2023.

== History ==
=== Hemsted Park ===
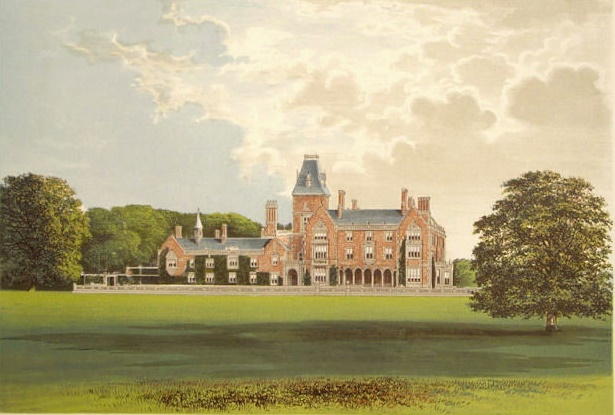
Hemsted Park c. 1870

The grounds which the school now occupies are known as Hemsted Park. The earliest available records show the land in the possession of Odo, Earl of Kent, the man believed to have commissioned the Bayeux Tapestry, having been given it—among much other property in the county—by his half-brother William the Conqueror.

The first property on the site was a house built by Robert of Hemsted in 1216. In the late 14th century, Richard II granted the manor to William of Guldeford. Elizabeth I visited Thomas Guldeford at the house and he was knighted by her at Rye a few days later.

In 1718 the property was sold to Sir John Norris, the commander-in-chief of George II's navy. He did a lot of work landscaping the property, forming much of the park as it is now.

Thomas Hallett Hodges bought the house in 1786. He reduced the size of the building and filled in the moat that had until that point encircled it. He also created the lake in the grounds. The Elizabethan property was demolished in 1860 following the acquisition of the estate by Lord Cranbrook. He commissioned the building of a new house, the extant Hemsted House, employing David Brandon, president of the Royal Institute of British Architects to design the new mansion. The house, which featured a prominent tower and was described as having "alarming vitality" was subsequently remodelled in 1912 by Herbert Cescinsky at the behest of its new owner, newspaper magnate and later Lord Rothermere, Harold Harmsworth. The remodelling saw the "vitality" toned down and the upper levels of the tower removed. It is now listed at grade II.

=== Benenden School ===
The school was founded in 1923 by three teachers from Wycombe Abbey—Christine Sheldon, Anne Hindle, and Kathleen Bird—who aimed to create a "happy school with personal integrity and service to others always in mind, where everyone would be given the chance to follow her own bent". It hence maintains sister-school ties with Wycombe Abbey, as well as Godstowe Preparatory School, High Wycombe, and St Leonards School.

In July 1923 the first council meeting of the new school was held and 24 girls were registered. The new school had a temporary home in Bickley for the first term while the three founders set about finding a new permanent site, requiring at least seventy bedrooms and large grounds. In January 1924 Hemsted Park, near the village of Benenden in Kent, was leased to the founders, and the school was named Benenden School, to avoid confusion with Hemel Hempstead. In March 1924 the prospectus of Benenden School (Kent) Limited was issued, with shares priced at £10 each; five shares entitled the holder to a nomination to the school. Every parent was encouraged to pay a year's fees in advance. In September 1924 there were 126 girls on the school roll, and in October 1924 the new Benenden School bought Hemsted House for £20,000.

1927 was an important year for Benenden, with the number of girls reaching 200. The first general inspection was made and Benenden was recognised as 'efficient'. The Seniors' Association was established, and the school magazine was inaugurated.

As the school grew, so more boarding houses were established or constructed: Norris House in 1924, Medway and Marshall in 1925, Echyngham in 1930, and Guldeford in 1936. The dining room was also built in 1936, with the school hall following in 1938.

In 1940, the school was evacuated from Kent, moving into the Hotel Bristol in Newquay, Cornwall, led by Christine Sheldon and Kathleen Bird, two of the founders. Anne Hindle stayed at Benenden to look after the estate and persuaded the Ministry of Health to use Benenden as a military hospital. On 3 August 1944, Jean Maridor, a Free French pilot, died when his aircraft crashed close to the school buildings and military hospital. He had just destroyed a German V-1 flying bomb the explosion from which also destroyed his own aircraft.

The founders retired in 1954 and Elizabeth Clarke became headmistress. In 1963 Princess Anne and Princess Basma of Jordan became pupils at Benenden. Janet Allen became headmistress in 1976. The Jubilee Wing was opened by Janet Allen and Kathleen Bird in 1977.

Gillian du Charme became headmistress in 1985. The new Guldeford House opened the following year. The 1987 hurricane hit Benenden hard and over 250 trees were lost in the parkland. Further expansion to the school began with the opening of the new science and medical wing, Leelands, in 1988. SPLASH opened in 1990. Two further sixth form houses opened in 1993 (Limes and Oaks).

The 75th anniversary of the school was celebrated in 1998–99 with a service at St Paul's Cathedral and a programme of special events for seniors at Benenden, St James's Palace and other London venues. The book Benenden: A Great Company by David Souden was published. The school play, written for the occasion, A Great Company was performed at Her Majesty's Theatre, Haymarket.

Claire Oulton, Head of St Catherine's Bramley and a graduate from Somerville College, Oxford, was appointed headmistress in 2000. In 2001 the Clarke Centre with the Eugenia Leung Library was completed. Norris House was redeveloped in 2003, creating new study bedrooms. The school dining room and cloisters were refurbished. The "new stage" theatre fundraising campaign was launched.

The new theatre was opened by Helena Bonham Carter in 2007. Grease was its first production in December of that year. The Seniors' Window was added to the chapel as part of a refurbishment and rededication. The following year the eco-classroom, a totally self-sustaining building, opened in the Victorian Water Gardens.

In 2008, there were about 525 girls aged eleven to eighteen, of whom 182 were in the sixth form. The average class size was 16, and there were 75 schoolteachers, making a teacher pupil ratio of 1:7. All girls were prepared for GCSE, AS Level, A Level, and universities, and academic, sport, drama, art, music, and design technology scholarships were available. In that year the Good Schools Guide called the school "[e]veryone's idea of a traditional, up-market, girls' boarding school, though not remotely hidebound by tradition."

The Benenden Science Centre was opened by the Princess Royal on 10 October 2012. The Leelands building was refurbished and became a classroom block for humanities subjects. The new all-weather pitch and pavilion was opened by television personality Davina McCall on 10 September 2016. Primarily for lacrosse and hockey, the new facility allows girls to train in all weather and in the mornings and evenings. After their first season training on the new pitch, Benenden's 1st lacrosse team won the National Schools Championships.

In 2025 Benenden was named winner by Muddy Stilettos School Awards, in the category of Awesome Sixth Form.

== Boarding ==
Benenden is a full-boarding school, with a limited number of day places since 2021, and has a maximum of 560 girls. Benenden says that its boarding ethos is to complement, not replace, family life. All students live in ten boarding houses. There are six junior boarding houses (ages 11–16), consisting of Marshall, Medway, Guldeford, Echyngham, Norris and Hemsted. The senior students, in their last two years (ages 16–18), go to sixth form houses called Beeches, Elms, Limes and Oaks, which make up the sixth form centre, known as Founders. Sixth formers remain members of their junior house and take up positions of responsibility in them. Founders have 184 single study bedrooms.

Each boarding house has a housemistress or housemaster, a deputy housemistress or housemaster, a team of matrons (resident, day and evening) as well as tutors. All teaching staff and a significant number of administrative staff are house tutors. The role of the tutor is to provide individual weekly support and guidance.

== Curricular activities ==
Applications to Benenden exceed available spots, and parents seeking to enroll their daughter often register her years in advance. Potential pupils seeking to begin boarding at 11 must pass the school's own entrance exam, while those who are 13 or older must pass the Common Entrance.

Benenden's stated aim is for its academic programme to encourage a lifelong enthusiasm for learning and discovery. The school has two main objectives: for every girl to achieve the best possible academic standards and qualifications, and for each girl to experience the maximum enjoyment in her learning. The curriculum is traditional, but also broad and forward-looking enough to provide education in its widest sense.

There is a traditional school hall where morning prayers are taken. The entire school must assemble for this every morning, except Wednesday, Saturday and Sunday, at 8:30. There is also a small chapel. Occasionally, the Sunday services are taken in the village church, about 15 to 20 minutes' walk away.

Lessons at the school start at 9 am and carry on until 5:10 pm. There are seven periods in the day; each lesson is 50 minutes long. Sports practices take place during the lunch break as well as after lessons end. In addition there are two hours' worth of lessons on Saturday mornings. Younger students will take a mixture of all subjects offered, as well as sports, music and PSHE classes.

Pupils studying for their GCSEs must generally take 10 or 11 subjects, including Mathematics, Science and English and one modern language. Classes average around 13 students at GCSE, and 6–8 students during A Levels. Drama and the Arts are popular; the school's annual play has on occasion been performed in London theatres such as the Palladium (Me and My Girl; 2002). The 2007 play was Grease, held in the new theatre, completed in February 2007. Productions since then have included A Christmas Carol, Tess of the d'Urbervilles, Grimm Tales, Beauty and the Beast, Romeo and Juliet, Kiss Me Kate and Les Miserables.

The school years are known, in order, as follows: Fourths (IV), Upper Fourths (UIV), Lower Fifths (LVths), Fifths (V), Upper Fifths (UV), Six Ones (VI1) and Six Twos (VI2). Each year around 24 school prefects are nominated. Instead of wearing the normal navy blue sixth-form uniform, they wear white- and red-striped blouses and grey jumpers. The prefects are known as "grey jumpers".

== Extracurriculars ==
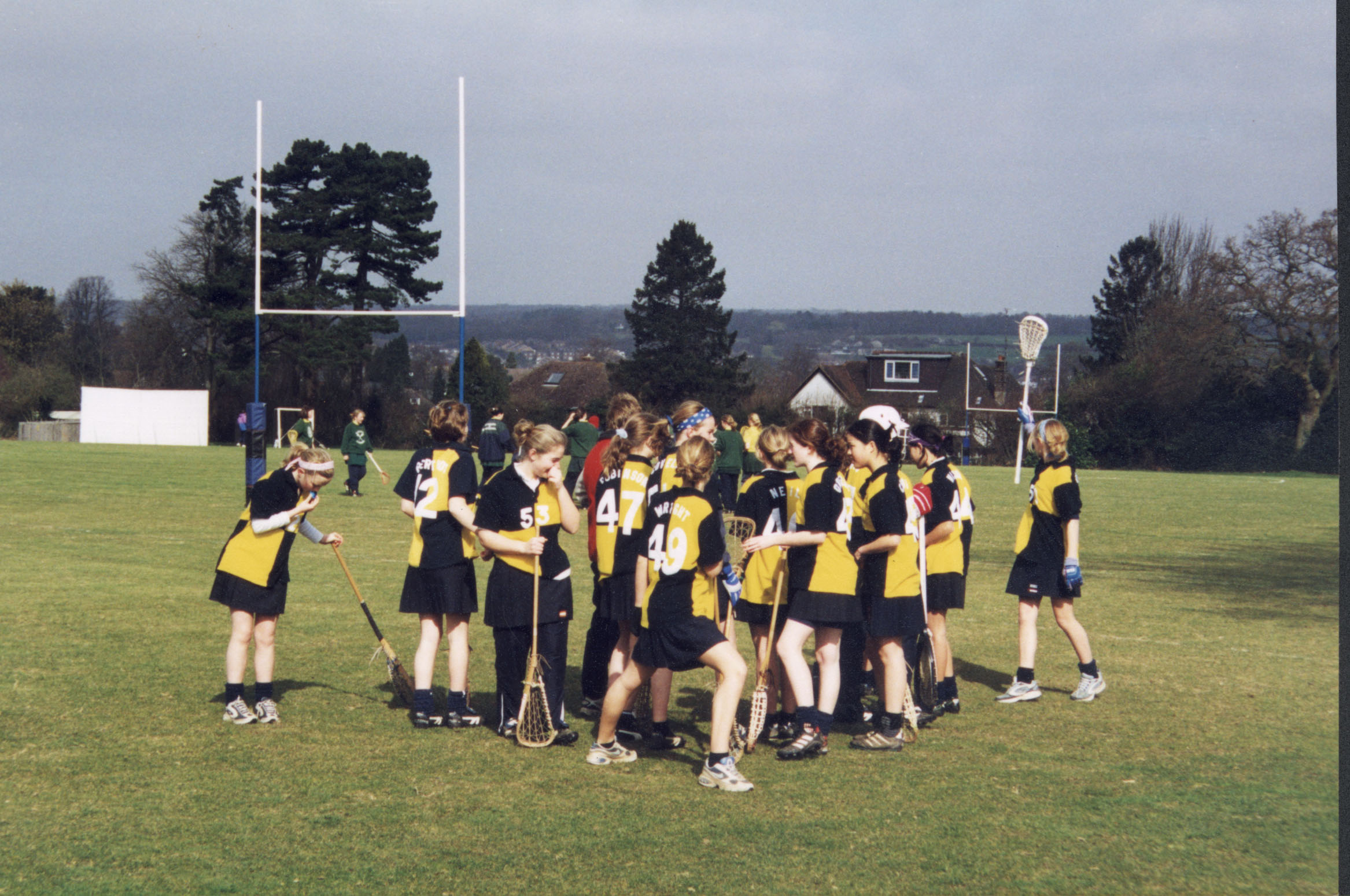
The Benenden Lacrosse team at the National School Tournament 2000

Benenden offers a range of extracurricular activities. The belief is that these lead to a more rounded education and strongly favour individualism.

=== Sports ===
Main school sports include lacrosse, rounders, karate, and tennis. Swimming is held in the Sunley Pool Leisure and Sports Hall (SPLASH), which accommodates a 250-foot pool and a gymnasium. Girls often play these at county and sometimes national levels; a current senior England lacrosse player was introduced as head of lacrosse in 2008. Other activities include hockey, fencing, badminton, volleyball, golf, riding, judo, tae kwondo, trampolining, rounders, football, aerobics, athletics, rugby sevens (Kent Girls Under-18 Champions 2009) and squash. Tours abroad are occasionally organised.

== Headmistresses ==
- 1923–1954: Christine Sheldon, Anne Hindle, and Kathleen Bird
- 1954–1976: Elizabeth Clarke
- 1976–1985: Janet Allen
- 1985–2000: Gillian du Charme, a graduate of Girton College, Cambridge
- 2000–2014: Claire Oulton, previously head of St Catherine's School, Bramley and a graduate of Somerville College, Oxford
- 2014-2024: Samantha Price, previously head of Godolphin School, Salisbury
- 2024 to present: Rachel Bailey, previously head of the Senior School at The Royal Masonic School for Girls

== Notable alumnae ==
Former pupils of Benenden School are known as Seniors.

- Amber Atherton, entrepreneur
- Anne, Princess Royal
- Alia bint Hussein, Princess of Jordan
- Basma bint Talal, Princess Royal of Jordan
- Gillian Baverstock (née Pollock), author and daughter of Enid Blyton
- Princess Benedikte of Denmark
- Imogen Boorman, actor
- Sal Brinton, President of the Liberal Democrats (2015—2020)
- Elizabeth M. Bryan, paediatrician
- Amanda de Cadenet, photographer, actress, television presenter
- Georgina Cookson, actor
- Lettice Curtis, aviator
- Jo Dipple, CEO of UK Music and special adviser to Gordon Brown
- Xanthe Elbrick, actor
- Liz Forgan, television and radio executive
- Rosie Garthwaite, journalist
- Prunella Gee, actress
- Georgina Harland, Olympic athlete
- Lady Victoria Hervey, socialite
- Rosalind Hicks, British literary guardian and only child of Agatha Christie
- Min Hogg (1939–2019), journalist
- Fiona Easdale, Olympic athlete
- Amy Jadesimi, managing director, LADOL
- Penny Junor, journalist
- Ellie Kendrick, actor
- Daisy Knatchbull, designer and businesswoman
- Bella Maclean, actor
- The Lady Manningham-Buller, Director General of MI5
- Jean Medawar, chairwoman of the Family Planning Association 1967–2005
- Naomi Elizabeth Molson, member of the Molson family of Canada
- Sarah Mulvey, television producer
- Morgana Robinson, comedian
- Sue Ryder, founder of the Sue Ryder Foundation
- Fiona Shackleton, solicitor
- Harriet Spicer, commissioner
- Veronica Wadley, journalist
- Anna Walker, civil servant
- Vicky Ward, journalist
- Rachel Weisz, actress
- Rachel Whetstone, PR executive

== Notable former staff ==
Frida Leakey worked here as a French teacher before she discovered a gorge of human fossils in Tanganyika.

== Summer school ==
Kent Music Summer School has been held at Benenden School since 1948.

== See also ==
- John Wallis Academy – school in Ashford sponsored by Benenden
