= Iden (disambiguation) =

Iden may refer to:

== Places ==
- Iden, Saxony-Anhalt, a town in Germany
- Iden, East Sussex, a village and civil parish in East Sussex, England

== Surname ==
- Brandt Iden (born 1983), American politician from Michigan
- Ellen Iden (1897–1961), Norwegian painter
- Geoff Iden (1914–1991), British runner, competed at the 1952 Olympics
- Gustav Iden (born 1996), Norwegian triathlete
- Henry Iden, English Member of Parliament for Shaftesbury in 1563
- Peter Iden (1934–2026), German theatre critic and art critic

== Other uses ==
- iDEN (Integrated Digital Enhanced Network) in mobile telecommunications technology
- Iden, an English automobile (1904–1907)
- Iden Versio, the main protagonist of the 2017 video game Star Wars Battlefront II

== See also ==
- Iden Green
