= Beacon Mill =

Beacon Mill is the name of a number of windmills.

Beacon Mill may be:-

- Beacon Mill, Benenden, Kent
- Beacon Mill, Rottingdean, Sussex
