= Union Mill, Cranbrook =

Grade I listed smock mill in Cranbrook, Kent, England

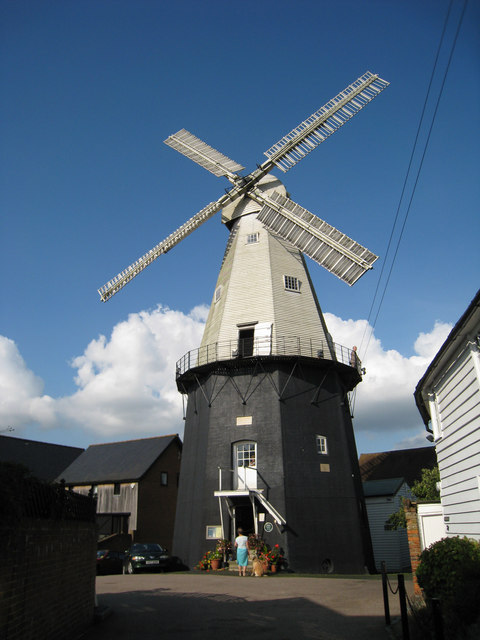
- The mill with traditional sails restored
- Interactive map of Union Mill, Cranbrook

Origin
- Mill location: The Hill, Cranbrook, Kent
- Grid reference: TQ779359
- Coordinates: 51°5′42.7″N 0°32′21.5″E
- Operator: Kent County Council
- Year built: 1814

Information
- Purpose: Corn mill
- Type: Smock mill
- Storeys: Three-storey smock
- Base storeys: Four-storey base
- Smock sides: Eight-sided
- No. of sails: Four
- Type of sails: Double Patent sails
- Windshaft: cast iron
- Winding: fantail
- Fantail blades: Eight
- Auxiliary power: Steam 1863 - 1919; Gas engine 1919 - 1954; Electric motor since 1954
- No. of pairs of millstones: Three pairs
- Size of millstones: 4 feet (1.22 m), 4 feet 4 inches (1.32 m) and 4 feet 6 inches (1.37 m) diameter.
- Other information: The tallest smock mill in the United Kingdom.

Union Mill is a Grade I listed smock mill in Cranbrook, Kent, England, which has been restored to working order. It is the tallest smock mill in the United Kingdom.

== History ==
Union Mill was built in 1814 by Cranbrook millwright James Humphrey for Mary Dobell and was initially worked by her son Henry. Mrs Dobell was declared bankrupt in 1819 and the mill was taken over by a union of her creditors, and thus gained its name. The mill was sold to John and George Russell in 1832, remaining in the Russell family for five generations until it was purchased by Kent County Council in 1957 after the retirement of the last miller.

Restoration commenced on 18 June 1958 and was completed in 1960, costing a total of £6,000. Rex Wailes presided over the official reopening of the mill. In 1994 the fantail was blown off during a storm, damaging the sails as it fell and landing on a parked car. In November 2010, the mill was repainted by a team from WallWalkers, who abseiled down the mill to access the smock, as an alternative to using scaffolding to surround the mill whilst the work was undertaken.

== Description ==
The mill is seven storeys tall, with a three-storey smock on a four-storey brick base, which consist of basement, ground, first and second floors. It cost £3,500 to build in 1814. The overall height to the cap roof is 72 feet (21.95 m). The mill was originally built with Common sails and a wooden windshaft, with a wide stage. In 1840, Samuel Medhurst, the Lewes millwright, fitted a cast-iron windshaft, and patent sails, which span 68 feet (20.73 m). The internal wooden machinery was also replaced with cast iron. George Warren, the Hawkhurst millwright fitted a fantail a few years later, giving the mill its current appearance. A 10 horsepower (7.5 kW) steam powered beam engine by Middleton of Southwark, Surrey, was added in 1863, along with an extra pair of millstones from a steam mill in Smarden.

In 1880, the wooden stage was replaced with a narrower one of iron, as the wide one was not needed with patent sails. This work was carried out by Warren. The beam engine was replaced in 1890 by a rotary steam engine made by Clarke's of Ashford. This was unsatisfactory and was replaced with a Fowler horizontal steam engine after a year or two. This engine was replaced by a suction gas engine in 1919. Second hand sails from Sarre Windmill were fitted in 1920. In the 1920s, a pair of sails was bought from Beacon Mill, Benenden for re-erection on the mill, but they proved not to be suitable. A pair of 4 feet (1.22 m) diameter millstones from Beacon Mill was installed in the mill about this time. The mill also had a pair of 4 feet 4 inches (1.32 m) diameter French Burr millstones and a pair of 4 feet 6 inches (1.37 m) Peak millstones. The mill worked for a few years longer powered by a gas engine, but had ceased milling by the early 1930s, but milling was restarted again. The gas engine was replaced by an electric motor in 1954.

== Millers ==
- Henry Dobell 1814–19
- John Russell 1832–73 (Thomas Hinkley 1830–1867)
- Ebenezer Russell 1875 –
- Hugh Russell –
- Caleb Russell 1902–18
- John Russell 1918–57
- Henry Hicks 1960 –

References for above:-

John Russell (9 February 1888 – 18 June 1958), was awarded the very first SPAB certificate in February 1935 for his "zeal in the maintenance" of his mill.

== Machinery ==
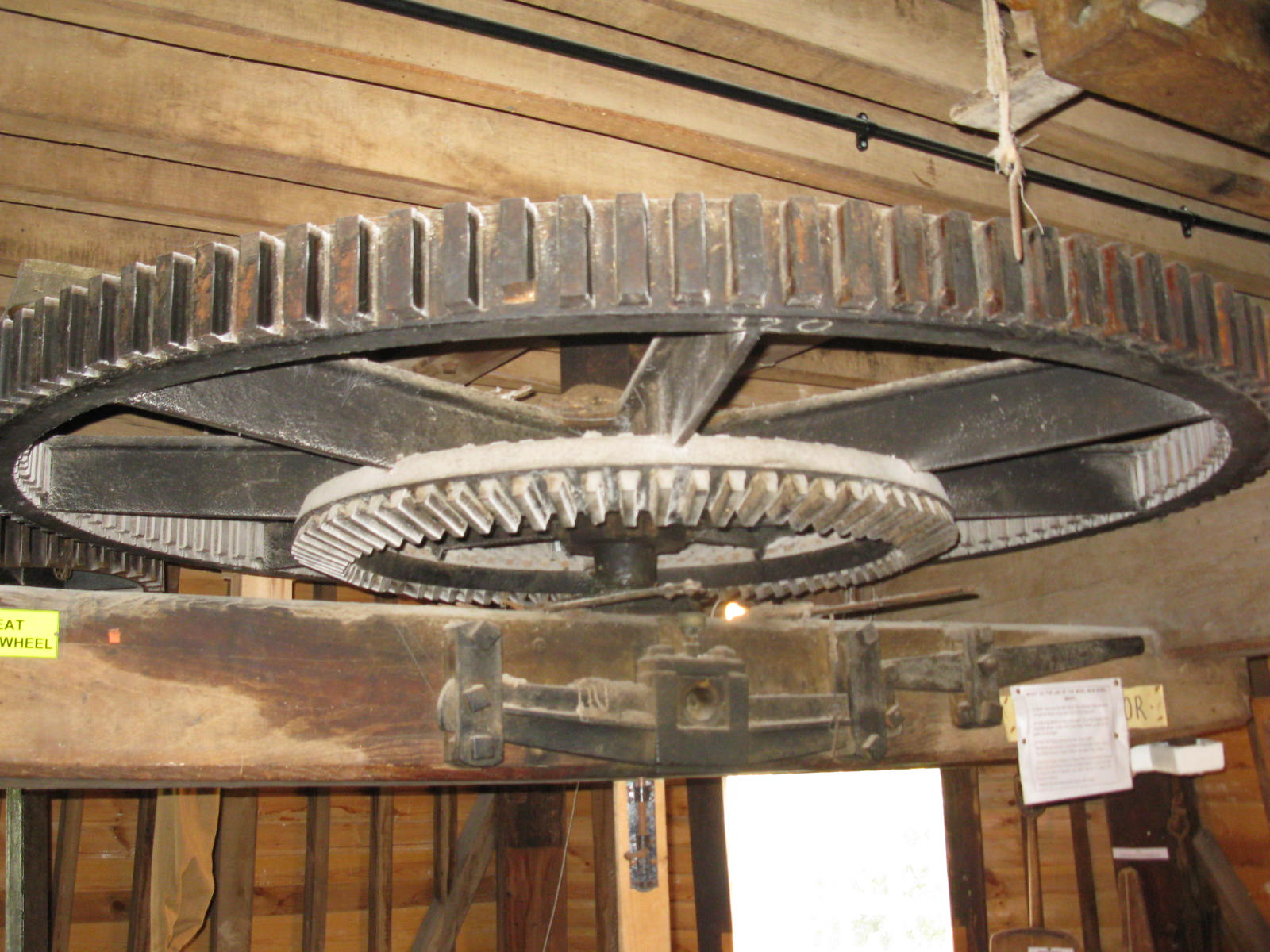
The great spur wheel and crown wheel

The four patent sails are now carried by traditional wooden stocks. When the mill was restored in the 1950s, the Dutch millwright Christiaan Bremer of Adorp, Groningen was employed, and he made the stocks in the Dutch style. Although these stocks served the mill for over forty years, they did not represent Kentish practice and were not in accordance with the Code of Practice of the Society for the Protection of Ancient Buildings covering mill restoration and repair. The stocks pass through the canister on the cast-iron windshaft, and this carries the brake wheel. The brake wheel drives the wallower, at the top of the upright shaft, and a sack hoist. At the bottom of the upright shaft is the great spur wheel, which drove three pairs of millstones, of which two remain. These are driven overdrift. A crown wheel drove auxiliary machinery.
