= 2010 Tunbridge Wells Borough Council election =

2010 UK local government election

Results of the 2010 Tunbridge Wells Borough Council election

The 2010 Tunbridge Wells Borough Council election took place on 6 May 2010 to elect members of Tunbridge Wells Borough Council in Kent, England. One third of the council was up for election and the Conservative Party stayed in overall control of the council.

After the election, the composition of the council was:

- Conservative 42
- Liberal Democrat 6

== Election result ==
The results saw the Conservatives stay in control of the council despite losing 2 seats. The Liberal Democrats gained seats in Benenden and Cranbrook wards to hold 6 seats, compared to 42 for the Conservatives. Overall turnout in the election was 68.59%.

Tunbridge Wells local election result 2010
| Party | Seats | Gains | Losses | Net gain/loss | Seats % | Votes % | Votes | +/− |
|---|---|---|---|---|---|---|---|---|
| Conservative | 12 | 0 | 2 | −2 | 75.0 | 54.1 | 25,870 | −2.7 |
| Liberal Democrats | 4 | 2 | 0 | +2 | 25.0 | 34.9 | 16,722 | +8.2 |
| Labour | 0 | 0 | 0 | 0 | 0.0 | 6.3 | 3,002 | +1.5 |
| UKIP | 0 | 0 | 0 | 0 | 0.0 | 2.9 | 1,389 | −2.1 |
| Green | 0 | 0 | 0 | 0 | 0.0 | 1.2 | 576 | −2.9 |
| Independent | 0 | 0 | 0 | 0 | 0.0 | 0.6 | 297 | −2.1 |

== Ward results ==
Benenden and Cranbrook
| Party | Candidate | Votes | % | ±% |
|---|---|---|---|---|
| Liberal Democrats | Francis Rook | 1,900 | 52.4 | +26.6 |
| Conservative | Peter Davies | 1,727 | 47.6 | +6.4 |
| Majority | | 173 | 4.8 | |
| Turnout | | 3,627 | 70.8 | +32.1 |
| Liberal Democrats gain from Conservative | | Swing | | |

Brenchley and Horsmonden
| Party | Candidate | Votes | % | ±% |
|---|---|---|---|---|
| Conservative | Alan McDermott | 1,971 | 69.1 | +6.7 |
| Liberal Democrats | John Billingham | 882 | 30.9 | −6.7 |
| Majority | | 1,089 | 38.2 | +13.3 |
| Turnout | | 2,853 | 75.8 | +33.4 |
| Conservative hold | | Swing | | |

Broadwater
| Party | Candidate | Votes | % | ±% |
|---|---|---|---|---|
| Liberal Democrats | Peter Crawford | 1,004 | 51.3 | +19.7 |
| Conservative | William Rutherford | 955 | 48.7 | −19.7 |
| Majority | | 49 | 2.6 | |
| Turnout | | 1,959 | 62.7 | +33.3 |
| Liberal Democrats hold | | Swing | | |

Culverden
| Party | Candidate | Votes | % | ±% |
|---|---|---|---|---|
| Conservative | Leonard Price | 1,934 | 52.1 | −5.0 |
| Liberal Democrats | Ian Williams | 1,222 | 32.9 | +32.9 |
| Green | Richard Leslie | 313 | 8.4 | −23.8 |
| UKIP | Patricia Theophanides | 198 | 5.3 | −5.4 |
| Independent | Ahsan Ahmad | 45 | 1.2 | +1.2 |
| Majority | | 712 | 19.2 | −5.7 |
| Turnout | | 3,712 | 65.9 | +34.4 |
| Conservative hold | | Swing | | |

Hawkhurst and Sandhurst
| Party | Candidate | Votes | % | ±% |
|---|---|---|---|---|
| Conservative | John Cunningham | 2,028 | 63.4 | −3.1 |
| Liberal Democrats | Keith Brown | 909 | 28.4 | +10.8 |
| Labour | David Burgess | 261 | 8.2 | +2.1 |
| Majority | | 1,119 | 35.0 | −13.8 |
| Turnout | | 3,198 | 70.5 | +33.3 |
| Conservative hold | | Swing | | |

Paddock Wood East
| Party | Candidate | Votes | % | ±% |
|---|---|---|---|---|
| Conservative | Bill Hills | 979 | 47.4 | −4.2 |
| Liberal Democrats | Hugh Patterson | 495 | 24.0 | +11.4 |
| Labour | Raymond Moon | 340 | 16.5 | −2.9 |
| Independent | Ron Goodman | 252 | 12.2 | −4.3 |
| Majority | | 484 | 23.4 | −8.8 |
| Turnout | | 2,066 | 67.5 | +34.8 |
| Conservative hold | | Swing | | |

Paddock Wood West
| Party | Candidate | Votes | % | ±% |
|---|---|---|---|---|
| Conservative | Elizabeth Thomas | 1,137 | 58.1 | −20.9 |
| Liberal Democrats | Damion Coleman | 536 | 27.4 | +27.4 |
| Labour | Terry White | 283 | 14.5 | −6.5 |
| Majority | | 601 | 30.7 | −27.3 |
| Turnout | | 1,956 | 66.5 | +38.3 |
| Conservative hold | | Swing | | |

Pantiles and St Marks
| Party | Candidate | Votes | % | ±% |
|---|---|---|---|---|
| Conservative | James Scholes | 2,159 | 59.3 | |
| Liberal Democrats | Christo Skelton | 1,195 | 32.8 | |
| Labour | Peter Mills | 289 | 7.9 | |
| Majority | | 964 | 26.5 | |
| Turnout | | 3,643 | 71.5 | |
| Conservative hold | | Swing | | |

Park
| Party | Candidate | Votes | % | ±% |
|---|---|---|---|---|
| Conservative | Catherine Mayhew | 2,155 | 56.0 | −6.1 |
| Liberal Democrats | Matthew Nash | 1,402 | 36.4 | +11.6 |
| UKIP | Eileen Gayler | 294 | 7.6 | +7.6 |
| Majority | | 753 | 19.6 | −17.7 |
| Turnout | | 3,851 | 72.3 | +37.9 |
| Conservative hold | | Swing | | |

Pembury
| Party | Candidate | Votes | % | ±% |
|---|---|---|---|---|
| Conservative | Michael Tompsett | 1,884 | 59.4 | −8.5 |
| Liberal Democrats | Lorraine Braam | 1,287 | 40.6 | +14.6 |
| Majority | | 597 | 18.8 | −23.0 |
| Turnout | | 3,171 | 70.0 | +29.4 |
| Conservative hold | | Swing | | |

St James'
| Party | Candidate | Votes | % | ±% |
|---|---|---|---|---|
| Liberal Democrats | David Neve | 1,666 | 64.9 | +6.3 |
| Conservative | Simon Bannister | 901 | 35.1 | +2.2 |
| Majority | | 765 | 29.8 | +4.1 |
| Turnout | | 2,567 | 64.6 | +31.5 |
| Liberal Democrats hold | | Swing | | |

St John's
| Party | Candidate | Votes | % | ±% |
|---|---|---|---|---|
| Liberal Democrats | Trevor Poile | 1,639 | 47.1 | +1.7 |
| Conservative | Chris Woodward | 1,577 | 45.3 | −0.6 |
| Green | Phyllis Leslie | 263 | 7.6 | −1.1 |
| Majority | | 62 | 1.8 | |
| Turnout | | 3,479 | 70.0 | +34.2 |
| Liberal Democrats gain from Conservative | | Swing | | |

Sherwood
| Party | Candidate | Votes | % | ±% |
|---|---|---|---|---|
| Conservative | Ted Jolley | 1,343 | 48.0 | −10.6 |
| Liberal Democrats | Timothy Woodman | 737 | 26.3 | +0.5 |
| Labour | Timothy Rich | 454 | 16.2 | +0.5 |
| UKIP | Christopher Hoare | 263 | 9.4 | +9.4 |
| Majority | | 606 | 21.7 | −11.1 |
| Turnout | | 2,797 | 58.3 | +29.4 |
| Conservative hold | | Swing | | |

Southborough and High Brooms
| Party | Candidate | Votes | % | ±% |
|---|---|---|---|---|
| Conservative | Colin Bothwell | 1,513 | 46.2 | +4.2 |
| Labour | Dianne Hill | 1,375 | 42.0 | +5.8 |
| UKIP | Beverley Bradshaw | 385 | 11.8 | +4.2 |
| Majority | | 138 | 4.2 | −1.7 |
| Turnout | | 3,273 | 63.7 | +31.8 |
| Conservative hold | | Swing | | |

Southborough North
| Party | Candidate | Votes | % | ±% |
|---|---|---|---|---|
| Conservative | Mike Rusbridge | 1,335 | 59.0 | +4.5 |
| Liberal Democrats | Jacqueline Prance | 927 | 41.0 | +1.3 |
| Majority | | 408 | 18.0 | +3.2 |
| Turnout | | 2,262 | 71.8 | +27.9 |
| Conservative hold | | Swing | | |

Speldhurst and Bidborough
| Party | Candidate | Votes | % | ±% |
|---|---|---|---|---|
| Conservative | Julia Soyke | 2,272 | 66.0 | −7.6 |
| Liberal Democrats | Robert Baldock | 921 | 26.8 | +8.7 |
| UKIP | Peter Fasey | 249 | 7.2 | −1.1 |
| Majority | | 1,351 | 39.3 | −16.2 |
| Turnout | | 3,442 | 74.8 | +34.4 |
| Conservative hold | | Swing | | |
