= Benenden Health =

Not-for-profit mutual society in the UK

The Benenden Healthcare Society Ltd.

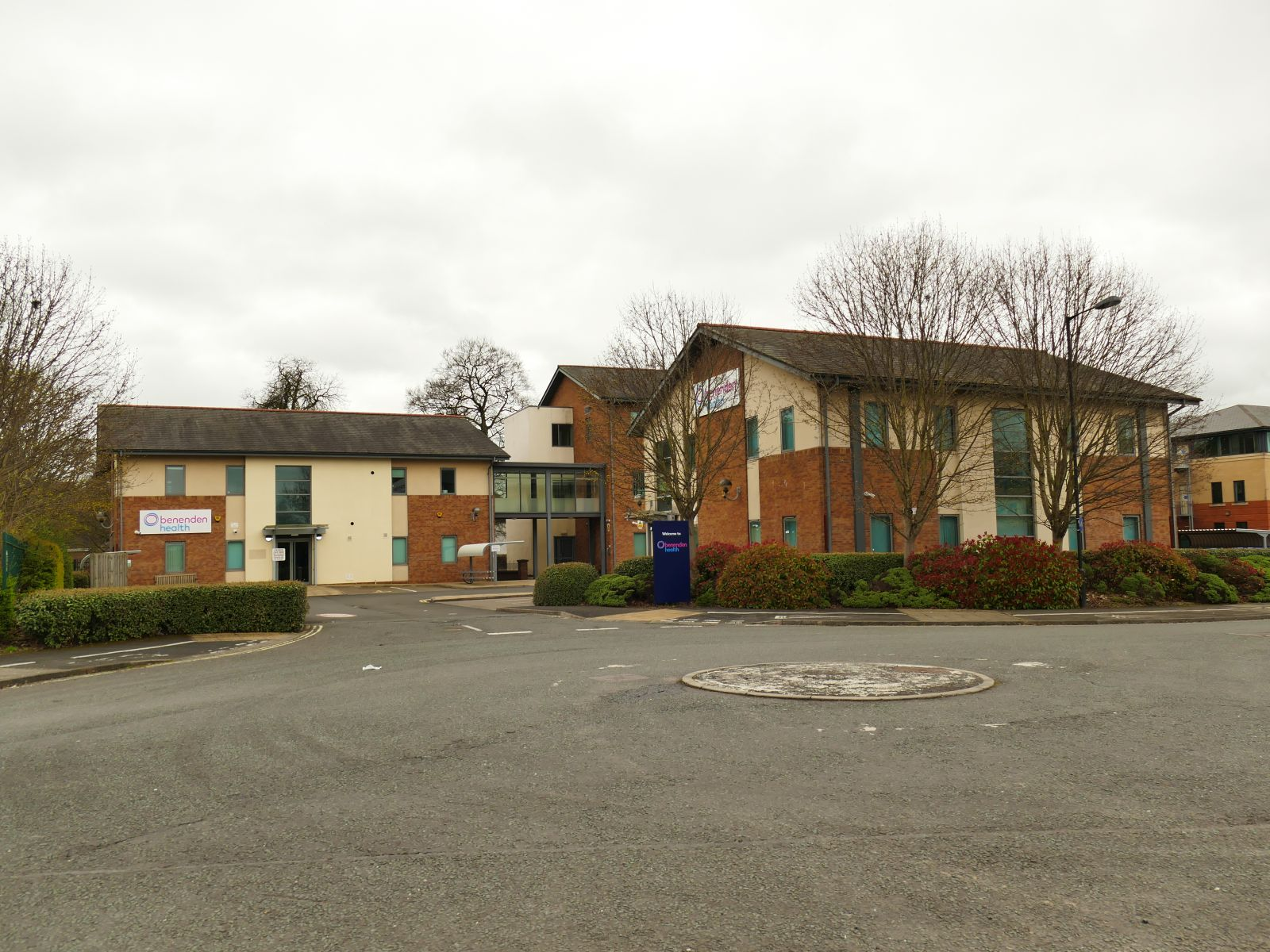
- Headquarters in York, UK
- Type: Limited company
- Industry: Healthcare
- Founded: 1905
- Headquarters: York, United Kingdom
- Key people: Tom Woolgrove, Chief Executive Officer (October 2024 – present)
- Products: hospital, health insurance, travel insurance, home insurance, private healthcare in the United Kingdom
- Number of employees: 400+
- Website: www.benenden.co.uk

Benenden Health (formerly The Post Office and Civil Service Sanatorium Society) is a not-for-profit mutual society in the UK providing private medical cover. Its membership consists of more than 870,000 individuals and employees of corporate schemes provided by them. Benenden Health was the shirt sponsor of York City Football Club from the 2012–13 season until the 2018–2019 season.

== History ==
The Post Office Branch of the National Association for the Establishment and Maintenance of Sanatoria for Workers Suffering from Tuberculosis Friendly Society was founded in 1905 to help working class Post Office employees control costs of the tuberculosis epidemic when conventional medical insurance was not widely affordable. The business model of weekly member fees was proposed by a Post Office clerk, Charles Garland.

In 1923, the name became The Post Office and Civil Service Sanatorium Society, as the membership was opened to a new industry. In October 1990, the registered office moved from London to York.

On 1 January 2010, the Society changed its name to the Benenden Healthcare Society.

Membership was restricted to those employed in the public sector, both at national and local level, which led to difficulties as many functions were being outsourced and, consequently, membership began to decline. In June 2012, delegates at Benenden Health's annual conference in Manchester voted to remove restrictions on membership. Also in June 2012, Benenden Health became shirt sponsor of York City Football Club. This sponsorship ended in the summer of 2019.

In early 2018, the Society rebranded using the trading style "Benenden Health".

== Benenden Hospital ==
Benenden Hospital was founded in 1907 near Benenden, Kent as a sanatorium location for tuberculosis treatment and became a centre for hospital treatment for members of Trade Unions and Friendly Societies, and subsequently public sector employees.

Benenden Hospital in its original form as "Benenden Sanatorium" was designed by Augustus William West, following pre-Bauhaus principles.

The hospital is now administered by Benenden Hospital Trust and is used by local National Health Service agencies and patients who use private medical insurance or who pay directly for their own hospital care. It is also one of a national network of 26 hospital facilities at which Benenden Health can authorise surgical and other treatment procedures. The hospital was rated outstanding by the Care Quality Commission in May 2017. 22% of its activity is now commissioned by the NHS, mostly orthopaedic, gynaecology and ophthalmology surgery for adults.

== Awards ==
- Most Trusted Health Insurance Provider - Moneywise Customer Service Awards 2014 and in 2015
- Most Trusted Health Insurance Provider via Employer – Moneywise Customer Service Awards 2019
- 100 Best Not-for-Profit Organisations 2019 – The Sunday Times
- Best Healthcare Service at the Investment Life & Pensions Moneyfacts Awards 2019

== Sponsorships ==
In January 2013, Benenden Health began its sponsorship deal with York City Football Club. After seven years of sponsoring York City Football Club, it was announced by York City chairman Jason McGill that Benenden Health would end its sponsorship.

Benenden Health has been a main sponsor of York Pride since 2012; this is an annual celebration for York and North Yorkshire's LGBT community.
