= The Great British Bake Off series 1 =

First series of The Great British Bake Off

The Great British Bake Off
- Series 1
- Presented by: Mel Giedroyc; Sue Perkins
- Judges: Mary Berry; Paul Hollywood
- No. of contestants: 10
- Winner: Edd Kimber
- Runner-up: Ruth Clemens
- Finals venue: Fulham Palace, London
- No. of max. bakes: 17
- No. of episodes: 6

Release
- Original network: BBC Two
- Original release: 17 August – 21 September 2010

Series chronology
- Next → Series 2

The first series of The Great British Bake Off first aired on BBC Two on 17 August 2010. Ten home bakers took part in a bake-off to test their baking skills as they battled to be designated the best amateur baker. Each week the programme bakers participated in three challenges in a particular discipline, with some being eliminated at the end of each episode. The rounds of the competition took place in various locations across the UK following a theme, for example, the episode on puddings took place in Bakewell, bread baking would take place near Sandwich. This first series had a voiceover by Stephen Noonan; for the subsequent series this role was taken by the on-screen presenters Mel Giedroyc and Sue Perkins. The competition was won by Edd Kimber.

== Bakers ==
| Contestant | Age | Hometown | Occupation | Finish | Place |
|---|---|---|---|---|---|
| Lea Harris | 51 | Midlothian | Retired | Episode 1 | 9th (tie) |
| Mark Whithers | 48 | South Wales | Bus Driver | Episode 1 | 9th (tie) |
| Annetha Mills | 30 | Essex | Midwife | Episode 2 | 7th (tie) |
| Louise Brimelow | 44 | Manchester | Police Officer | Episode 2 | 7th (tie) |
| Jonathan Shepherd | 25 | St Albans | Research Analyst | Episode 3 | 6th |
| David Chambers | 31 | Milton Keynes | Entrepreneur | Episode 4 | 5th |
| Jasminder "Jas" Randhawa | 45 | Birmingham | Assistant Credit Control Manager | Episode 5 | 4th |
| Miranda Gore Browne | 37 | Midhurst | Food buyer for Marks & Spencer | Episode 6 | 3rd |
| Ruth Clemens | 31 | Pointon | Retail manager/Housewife | Episode 6 | 2nd |
| Edward 'Edd' Kimber | 24 | Bradford | Debt collector for Yorkshire Bank | Episode 6 | 1st |

== Results summary ==
Elimination chart
| Baker | 1 | 2 | 3 | 4 | 5 | 6 |
|---|---|---|---|---|---|---|
| Edd | HIGH | HIGH | HIGH | LOW | HIGH | WINNER |
| Ruth | HIGH | SAFE | HIGH | HIGH | HIGH | Runner Up |
| Miranda | HIGH | HIGH | SAFE | HIGH | LOW | Third |
| Jas | SAFE | SAFE | LOW | HIGH | OUT | |
| David | LOW | LOW | LOW | OUT | | |
| Jonathan | SAFE | HIGH | OUT | | | |
| Annetha | HIGH | OUT | | | | |
| Louise | LOW | OUT | | | | |
| Lea | OUT | | | | | |
| Mark | OUT | | | | | |

Colour key:

Baker got through to the next round.
Baker was eliminated
Baker was one of the judges' least favourite bakers that week, but was not eliminated.
Baker was one of the judges' favourite bakers that week.
Baker was the series runner-up.
Baker was the series winner.

== Episodes ==
=== Episode 1: Cakes ===
For the first challenge, the bakers were instructed to bake any cake they want using their creativity within 3 hours. It had to be evenly baked, evenly risen, and moist. For the technical challenge, the bakers were to make a Victoria Sandwich using Mary Berry's recipe. For the final challenge, the showstopper challenge, the bakers were required to make a Chocolate Celebration Cake, with perfect execution, original ideas and their own flair.

Location: Cotswolds
| Baker | Signature (Cake) | Technical (Victoria Sandwich) | Showstopper (Chocolate Celebration Cake) | Result |
|---|---|---|---|---|
| Annetha | Light Jamaican Black Cake with Strawberries and Cream | 2nd | Chocolate Cake with Cigarellos, Fresh Fruit, and Cream | Safe |
| David | Chocolate Orange Cake | 3rd | Black Forest Floor Gateau with Chocolate Leaves, Fallen Fruit, and Chocolate Mushrooms | Safe |
| Edd | Caramel Cinnamon and Banana Cake | 1st | UNKNOWN | Safe |
| Jasminder | Fresh Mango and Passion Fruit Hummingbird Cake | —N/a | UNKNOWN | Safe |
| Jonathan | Carrot Cake with Lime and Cream Cheese Icing | 9th | Three Tiered Chocolate Cake with Almond and Cherry | Safe |
| Lea | Cranberry and Pistachio Cake with Orange Flower Water Icing | 10th | Raspberries and Cream Chocolate Cake with Chocolate-Dipped Fresh Fruit | Eliminated |
| Louise | Carrot and Orange Cake | —N/a | Never Fail Chocolate Sponge Cake, with Fresh Fruit | Safe |
| Mark | Sticky Marmalade Tea Loaf | —N/a | Heart-shaped Chocolate and Beetroot Cake | Eliminated |
| Miranda | Triple Layered Brownie Meringue Cake with Raspberry Cream | 8th | Three Tiered Chocolate Fudge Cake with Handmade Chocolate Button Decorations | Safe |
| Ruth | Lemon Drizzle Cake with Fresh Cream and freshly made Lemon Curd | —N/a | Classic Chocolate Sponge wrapped in a Chocolate Collar topped with Handmade White and Dark Chocolate Truffles | Safe |

=== Episode 2: Biscuits ===
For the signature bake, the bakers were asked to bake their Signature Personality Biscuits within 2 hours. The technical challenge required them to bake scones using Paul Hollywood's recipe within 1 hour. For the showstopper, the bakers were asked to produce three different Petit Fours: Meringues, Choux Pastry, and Macarons, within 4 hours.

Location: Scone Palace, Perthshire
| Baker | Signature (Personality Biscuit) | Technical (Scones) | Showstopper (Petit fours: Meringues, Choux Pastry and Macarons) | Result |
|---|---|---|---|---|
| Annetha | Rose Petal Shortbread | 7th | Pink Swirl Macarons; Eclairs | Eliminated |
| David | Cheddar Cheese and Fresh Rosemary Biscuits | 8th | Choux Pastry Swans; Plain Meringues | Safe |
| Edd | Oatmeal Raisin Cookies | 6th | Pink Macarons; Passion Fruit Meringues | Safe |
| Jasminder | Millionaires' Shortbread | 2nd | Meringues with Chocolate and Space Dust; Coffee Flavoured Eclairs | Safe |
| Jonathan | Honey and Candied Ginger Cookies | 1st | Meringues with Whiskey Cream and Chocolate | Safe |
| Louise | Stained Glass Window Shortbread | 4th | Strawberry, Mint, and Cream Meringue Baskets; Chocolate Eclairs; Orange, Yellow and Pink Macarons | Eliminated |
| Miranda | Fresh Vanilla Biscuits with Royal Icing | 3rd | Pistachio Macarons | Safe |
| Ruth | Peanut Shortbread with Salted Peanut Caramel | 5th | Almond Macaron with Violet Buttercream; Raspberries and Cream Eclairs | Safe |

=== Episode 3: Bread ===
For their signature bake, the bakers were given 3 1/2 hours to produce their signature bread loaf. The technical challenge required them to bake a traditional round cob loaf, using Paul's recipe in 2 1/2 hours. For the showstopper, the bakers were asked to bake 12 sweet rolls and 12 savoury rolls, with three flavours of each, within 6 hours.

Location: Sarre Windmill, Kent
| Baker | Signature (Breads) | Technical (Round Cob Loaf) | Showstopper (12 Sweet and 12 Savoury Rolls) | Result |
|---|---|---|---|---|
| David | Chilli Bread | 4th | Walnut and Seed Roll; Red Berry and Almond Bun; Tomato and Herb Rolls | Safe |
| Edd | Olive Bread | 1st | Tomato, Mozzarella, and Chorizo Rolls; Chelsea Buns; Hot Cross Buns | Safe |
| Jasminder | Focaccia | 5th | Mango and Sultana Buns; Pain au Chocolat with Mars Bars; Tutti Frutti Wheels with Jelly Tots; Tomato and Cheese Rolls | Safe |
| Jonathan | Anchovy, Sweet Paprika and Oregano Bread | 6th | Sticky Lemon Honey Buns; Olive and Anchovy Rolls; Sun-Dried Tomato and Fresh Herb Rolls; Stilton, Walnut and Braeburn Apple Rolls; Cinnamon, Cardamom, and Sultana Chelsea Buns with Icing | Eliminated |
| Miranda | Walnut and Apricot Bread | 3rd | Lemon Iced Buns; Chocolate and Orange Buns; Cranberry Buns with Icing Sugar | Safe |
| Ruth | Maple and Pecan Bread | 2nd | Chocolate and Orange Panettone; Cranberry Bagels | Safe |

=== Episode 4: Puddings ===
For the first challenge, the bakers were asked to bake their own classic pudding, steamed or baked, in 2 1/2 hours. In the technical challenge, the bakers were required to use Mary's recipe to bake four miniature lemon souffles within 40 minutes. The bakers started to bake at different time intervals. The showstopper gave the bakers 5 hours to produce three puddings: crumble, bread, and suet.

Location: Bakewell, Derbyshire
| Baker | Signature (Steamed or Baked Pudding) | Technical (Mini Hot Lemon Soufflés) | Showstopper (3 Puddings: Crumble, Bread, and Suet) | Result |
|---|---|---|---|---|
| David | Pear and Walnut Pudding | 5th | Apple and Blackberry Crumble; Rhubarb and Orange Betty; Suet Pear | Eliminated |
| Edd | Apple and Plum Pudding | 3rd | Apple and Cinnamon Crumble; Nutella Banana Brioche Bread Pudding; Rhubarb and Strawberry Suet Layer | Safe |
| Jasminder | Sticky Toffee Pudding | 2nd | Bread and Butter Pudding; Treacle Suet Pudding with Fresh Fruit; Apple and Pineapple Crumble | Safe |
| Miranda | Sticky Toffee Pudding | 1st | Queen of Puddings; Chocolate Pear Roly Poly; Strawberry and Rhubarb Crumble | Safe |
| Ruth | Peach and Blueberry Boy Bait | 4th | Apple and Ginger Crumble; Rhubarb Suet Pudding; Cherry Queen of Puddings | Safe |

=== Episode 5: Pastry ===
For the signature challenge, the bakers were asked to bake a savoury pie in 2 1/2 hours. For the technical challenge, the bakers were asked to bake 4 Cornish pasties in 1 1/2 hours. For the showstopper, the bakers were asked to bake 2 pastry platters containing savory canapés and sweet tartlets in 5 hours.

Location: Mousehole, Cornwall
| Baker | Signature (Savoury Pies) | Technical (4 Cornish Pasties) | Showstopper (Tarts and Canapés) | Result |
|---|---|---|---|---|
| Edd | Chicken, Ham, Leek and Tarragon Pie | 2nd | Sweet Tarts: Almond Sweet Tart with Ginger and Chocolate Yorkshire Curd Tart Savoury Canapés: Chickpea and Salami Pâté; Red and Yellow Pepper Tart; Asparagus Gruyere Quiche Tartlets | Safe |
| Jasminder | Chicken and Mushroom Pie | 4th | Sweet Tarts: Jaggery Tart; Fruit and Custard Tart; Savoury Canapés: Thai Chili and Red Onion Canapés; Duck in Plum Sauce Canapés; Salmon and Prawn Canapés | Eliminated |
| Miranda | Summery Salmon, Cod and Prawn Fish Pie | 1st | Sweet Tarts: Chocolate Pastry filled with Orange Cheesecake and Milk Chocolate Ganache; Strawberry Tart with Red Currant Glaze; Savoury Canapés: Cheesy Crab Bites; Broad Bean and Tomato Pastry Hearts; Pancetta and Leek Risotto Canapés | Safe |
| Ruth | Minced Beef Pie | 3rd | Sweet Tarts: Raspberry and Dark Chocolate Tart; Creme Patisserie and Cherry Tart; Citrus Curd Tart with Creme Brulee Top; Savoury Canapés: Roasted Tomato Canapés; Asparagus Pastry Twirls | Safe |

=== Episode 6: Tea Party (Final) ===
In the final, one of the three finalists was eliminated after the first bake, and only two bakers competed in the final day. For the first challenge, they were asked to bake 24 professional-quality miniature cakes in 2 1/2 hours. For the final challenge, the 2 finalists were given 5 hours to bake 24 miniature tarts, 24 scones, 24 choux buns, and 24 brown and white bread finger sandwiches for afternoon tea on the garden lawn for 40 guests (including all the bakers from earlier rounds).

Location: Fulham Palace, London
| Baker | Signature (24 Professional Miniature Cakes) | Showstopper Afternoon Tea Party: Petit Fours, Scones, Finger Sandwiches | Result |
|---|---|---|---|
| Edd | Cinnamon and Banana Cakes | Chocolate and Ginger Tarts; Lemon Scones with Passion Fruit Curd; Raspberry Choux Buns; Finger Sandwiches | Winner |
| Miranda | Lemon Cupcakes | —N/a | Eliminated at signature |
| Ruth | Mint, Ginger and Blackberry Cakes | Red Pepper and Cheese Quiche Tarts; Sultana Scones; Vanilla and Lemon Choux Buns; Finger Sandwiches | Runner-up |

It took the judges nearly five hours to determine whom to eliminate, and had to look back at their performances over the series as a whole to make a decision. The idea of eliminating a contestant in the final was dropped from future series.

== Post-show career ==
After winning the competition, Edd Kimber is able to make his living from baking. He worked in the pastry kitchen at Raymond Blanc's restaurant Le Manoir. He has written three books on baking, The Boy Who Bakes, Say It With Cake, and Patisserie Made Simple: From Macaron to Millefeuille and More. He has taught macaron making classes in London, run a pop-up bakery in Fortnum & Mason, and appeared as a 'resident baker' on The Alan Titchmarsh Show.

Ruth Clemens has written a number of books on cake making and baking, including Busy Girls Guide to Cake Decorating, The Pink Whisk Guide to Cake Making, The Pink Whisk Guide to Baking and Creative Éclairs.

Miranda Gore Browne wrote a book, Biscuit, published on 5 April 2012. Her second book, Bake Me a Cake as Fast as You Can, was published in August 2014.

Jonathan Shepherd left his job in the pharmaceutical company and launched a new business, The Pudding Stop, in St Albans. It started as a portable street-food vendor and a supplier of puddings to restaurants. Shepherd has since also opened a shop, also in St Albans.

Mark Whithers, who was eliminated in Episode 1, died on 11 May 2013 after suffering from cancer.

Lea Harris participated in the 2024 rendition of The Great New Year's Bake Off.

== The Great British Wedding Cake ==
In this one-off special edition, the three finalists from series one (Edd, Ruth and Miranda) returned. Paul Hollywood and Mary Berry set them the challenge of making and baking two spectacular Wedding Cakes each in just sixteen hours, one being traditional and the other contemporary. Paul and Mary explore the history of the Great British Wedding Cake, looking at the dramatic changes through the eras; from the Tudors and the Victorians, wartime Britain and the eighties to the present day. Although Paul and Mary judged the results, no individual winner was declared.

== Ratings ==
Official episode viewing figures are from BARB.

| Episode no. | Airdate | Viewers (millions) | BBC Two weekly ranking | Nightly ranking |
|---|---|---|---|---|
| 1 | 17 August 2010 | 2.24 | 7 | 12 |
| 2 | 24 August 2010 | 3.00 | 3 | 10 |
| 3 | 31 August 2010 | 3.00 | 2 | 11 |
| 4 | 7 September 2010 | 2.60 | 4 | 11 |
| 5 | 14 September 2010 | 3.03 | 1 | 10 |
| 6 | 21 September 2010 | 2.75 | 1 | 10 |

=== Specials ===
The Great British Wedding Cake
| Episode no. | Airdate | Viewers (millions) | BBC Two weekly ranking |
|---|---|---|---|
| | 20 April 2011 | 1.60 | 19 |
