= Sarre Windmill =

Windmill in Sarre, Kent, England

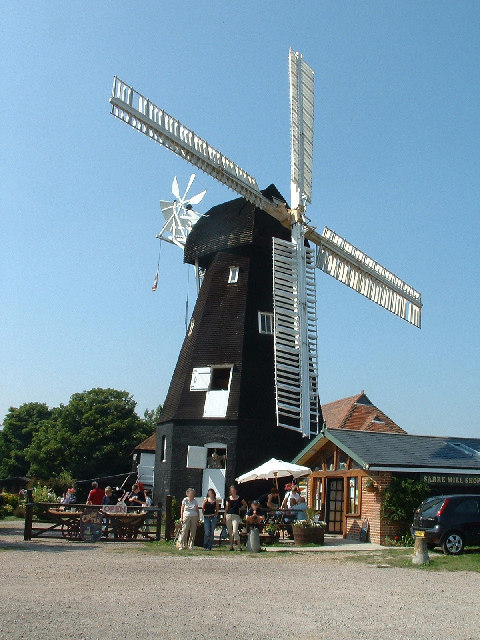

Origin
- Grid reference: TR 259 651
- Coordinates: 51°20′23″N 1°14′35″E
- Operators: Hobbs (?–2011); Unknown (2011–)
- Year built: 1821

Information
- Purpose: Corn mill Holiday Let (2011–)
- Type: Smock mill
- Storeys: Three-storey smock
- Base storeys: Two-storey base
- Smock sides: Eight-sided
- No. of sails: Four
- Type of sails: Double Patent sails
- Windshaft: Cast iron
- Winding: Fantail
- Fantail blades: Six bladed
- Auxiliary power: Steam engine 1861–1920; Gas engine 1920–1940
- No. of pairs of millstones: Two pairs
- Other information: The first windmill in Kent to have a steam engine as auxiliary power.

Sarre Windmill is a Grade II listed smock mill in Sarre, Kent, England, that was built in 1820. Formerly restored and working commercially, the mill is now closed.

== History ==
Sarre windmill was built in 1820 by the Canterbury millwright John Holman. It was said to have been moved from Monkton, but it is more likely to have had some machinery from that mill included in its construction. It was marked on the 1819–43 Ordnance Survey map. Sarre mill was originally built with a single-storey brick base, but in 1856 the base was raised to 14 feet (4.27 m) high, with an extra storey built under it. Sarre mill was the first windmill in Kent to have a steam engine installed as auxiliary power. This was added in 1861. The mill was worked by wind until 1920, when the sails were taken down, and installed on the Union Mill, Cranbrook and a gas engine was fitted. The mill worked for a few years longer powered by the gas engine, but had ceased milling by the early 1930s. The mill was recommissioned in the late 1930s, again powered by the gas engine, before finally stopping in 1940 as the engine had been damaged by frost in the severe winter that year. The mill was used as an observation post during the Second World War. The mill remained semi-derelict until 1986, when restoration was started, being completed in 1991. The mill is currently closed as of October 2025.

== Description ==
Sarre windmill is a three-storey smock mill on a two-storey brick base. It has four double patent sails carried on a cast-iron windshaft. The mill is winded by a fantail. The Brake Wheel is a composite one, with iron arms and a wooden rim. This drives a cast-iron Wallower. The Great Spur Wheel is also of cast iron. The mill drives two pairs of millstones, overdrift.

== Millers ==
- Thomas Holman 1845 - 1862
- George Thomas Steddy 1878
- Ebenezer Wood 1880 - 1883
- Hogben
- Gambrill - 1940
- Malcolm Hobbs 1991 -
- Robert Hobbs 1991 -

References for above:-

== In popular culture ==
For Bread Week of Season 1 of The Great British Bake Off, the tent was pitched near the windmill.
