= Listed buildings in Benenden =

Civil Parish in Kent, England

Benenden is a village and civil parish in the Borough of Tunbridge Wells of Kent, England. It contains 152 listed buildings that are recorded in the National Heritage List for England. Of these eight are grade II* and 144 are grade II.

This list is based on the information retrieved online from Historic England.

== Key ==
Grade	Criteria
I	Buildings that are of exceptional interest
II*	Particularly important buildings of more than special interest
II	Buildings that are of special interest

== Listing ==
Name	Grade	Location	Type	Completed (Note: The date given is the date used by Historic England as significant for the initial building or that of an important part in the structure's description.)	Date designated	Grid ref. (Note: The grid reference is based on the British national grid reference system, sometimes known as OSGB36, used by the Ordnance Survey.) Geo-coordinates	Notes	Entry number (Note: The "List Entry Number" is a unique number assigned to each listed building and scheduled monument by Historic England.)	Image	Wikidata
Babbs Farmhouse	II*	Babbs Lane	farmhouse		20 June 1967	TQ7913932948; 51°04′04″N 0°33′19″E		1281647	Babbs Farmhouse More images	Q17547679
Barn at Babbs Farmhouse	II	Babbs Lane			11 February 1992	TQ7910932958; 51°04′05″N 0°33′18″E		1085265	Upload Photo	Q26371636
Stables at Babbs Farmhouse	II	Babbs Lane			27 September 1991	TQ7913032915; 51°04′03″N 0°33′19″E		1281614	Upload Photo	Q26570646
Garden Cottage, Benenden School	II	Benenden School, Cranbrook Road			5 July 1993	TQ8041134137; 51°04′41″N 0°34′27″E		1085252	Upload Photo	Q26371562
South Lodge, Benenden School	II	Benenden School, Cranbrook Road			5 July 1993	TQ8022433236; 51°04′13″N 0°34′16″E		1336731	Upload Photo	Q26621208
The Walled Garden, Benenden School	II	Benenden School, Cranbrook Road			5 July 1993	TQ8043534088; 51°04′40″N 0°34′28″E		1281476	Upload Photo	Q26570526
Bishopsdale	II	Bishopsdale			5 July 1993	TQ8480735048; 51°05′06″N 0°38′14″E		1085266	Upload Photo	Q26371641
Bishopsden	II	Bishopsdale			5 July 1993	TQ8437435157; 51°05′10″N 0°37′52″E		1336728	Upload Photo	Q26621205
Ryecroft	II	Chapel Lane, Iden Green			5 July 1993	TQ8045931932; 51°03′30″N 0°34′25″E		1203581	Upload Photo	Q26499102
Field Farmhouse	II	Coldharbour Road			5 July 1993	TQ8026932025; 51°03′33″N 0°34′16″E		1085268	Upload Photo	Q26371653
Hague Cottages	II	1 and 2, Coldharbour Road, Iden Green			5 July 1993	TQ8030331808; 51°03′26″N 0°34′17″E		1281624	Upload Photo	Q26570655
Iden Green Farmhouse	II	Coldharbour Road			5 July 1993	TQ7967332108; 51°03′37″N 0°33′45″E		1085267	Upload Photo	Q26371647
Oathouse at Stream Farm	II	Coldharbour Road			5 July 1993	TQ8008432330; 51°03′43″N 0°34′07″E		1203602	Upload Photo	Q26499120
Scullsgate	II	Coldharbour Road			20 June 1967	TQ7931932470; 51°03′49″N 0°33′28″E		1203587	Upload Photo	Q26499107
Stream Farm Cottages	II	Coldharbour Road			5 July 1993	TQ7998332305; 51°03′43″N 0°34′02″E		1336729	Upload Photo	Q26621206
Stream Farmhouse	II	Coldharbour Road			5 July 1993	TQ8009932303; 51°03′43″N 0°34′08″E		1085269	Upload Photo	Q26371660
Astrolabe at Benenden School	II	Cranbrook Road			5 July 1993	TQ8010533738; 51°04′29″N 0°34′10″E		1281597	Upload Photo	Q26570630
Corner Cottages	II	1-4, Cranbrook Road			26 April 1990	TQ8014133222; 51°04′12″N 0°34′11″E		1336730	Upload Photo	Q26621207
Crabtree	II	Cranbrook Road			5 July 1993	TQ7960434393; 51°04′51″N 0°33′46″E		1281592	Upload Photo	Q26570625
Crit Hall	II	Cranbrook Road			5 July 1993	TQ7875033498; 51°04′23″N 0°33′00″E		1281573	Upload Photo	Q26570607
Gateway to the Old Manor House	II	Cranbrook Road			5 July 1993	TQ8056533072; 51°04′07″N 0°34′33″E		1336713	Upload Photo	Q26621190
Hemsted House Benenden School Including Attached Terrace Wall	II	Cranbrook Road			28 November 1986	TQ8024633803; 51°04′31″N 0°34′18″E		1085270	Upload Photo	Q26371665
Ice House at Benenden School	II	Cranbrook Road			5 July 1993	TQ8026634116; 51°04′41″N 0°34′19″E		1203647	Upload Photo	Q26499165
Little Critt	II	Cranbrook Road			5 July 1993	TQ7881833504; 51°04′23″N 0°33′04″E		1085271	Upload Photo	Q26371672
Mounts Farm Barn	II	Cranbrook Road			5 July 1993	TQ7978133422; 51°04′19″N 0°33′53″E		1203654	Upload Photo	Q26499172
Mounts Farm Cottage	II	Cranbrook Road			20 June 1967	TQ7981333418; 51°04′19″N 0°33′55″E		1336694	Upload Photo	Q26621172
School Farm	II	Cranbrook Road			5 July 1993	TQ7859333726; 51°04′30″N 0°32′53″E		1085272	Upload Photo	Q26371678
The Moat	II	Cranbrook Road			9 June 1952	TQ7890933494; 51°04′22″N 0°33′09″E		1085231	Upload Photo	Q26371447
The Old Manor House	II	Cranbrook Road			9 June 1952	TQ8058833097; 51°04′08″N 0°34′34″E		1085232	Upload Photo	Q26371453
Cattsford and Associated Privy	II	Dingleden Lane			15 February 2008	TQ8187730323; 51°02′36″N 0°35′35″E		1392406	Upload Photo	Q26671626
Dockenden	II	Dockenden Lane			5 July 1993	TQ8173635415; 51°05′21″N 0°35′37″E		1085233	Upload Photo	Q26371459
Weald Property Management, Dunroamin, Oakdene, Madle Cottage, Forge Cottage and Dolphin Cottage	II	Dunroamin, Oakdene, Madle Cottage, Forge Cottage And Dolphin Cottage, The Street, Beneden, Cranbrook, TN17 4DJ			5 July 1993	TQ8078232948; 51°04′03″N 0°34′44″E		1204487	Upload Photo	Q26499926
Barn Approximately 30 Metres South East of the Red House	II	Goddard's Green			5 July 1993	TQ8237734622; 51°04′55″N 0°36′09″E		1085239	Upload Photo	Q26371488
Barn at Pympe Manor	II	Goddard's Green			9 June 1952	TQ8275434310; 51°04′44″N 0°36′27″E		1203693	Upload Photo	Q26499208
Eaton Cottage Finnigans Cottage	II	6, Goddard's Green			5 July 1993	TQ8169034491; 51°04′51″N 0°35′33″E		1085236	Upload Photo	Q26371476
Eaton House	II	Goddard's Green			20 June 1967	TQ8201034612; 51°04′55″N 0°35′50″E		1085235	Upload Photo	Q26371470
Goddard's Green Cottages	II	4 and 5, Goddard's Green			5 July 1993	TQ8167034479; 51°04′51″N 0°35′32″E		1085234	Upload Photo	Q26371464
Goddard's Green Cottages	II	1, 2, 3, Goddard's Green			5 July 1993	TQ8166034470; 51°04′51″N 0°35′32″E		1336714	Upload Photo	Q26685014
Old Eaton Oast	II	Goddard's Green			5 July 1993	TQ8199534604; 51°04′55″N 0°35′49″E		1085237	Upload Photo	Q26371483
Pympe Manor	II*	Goddard's Green			9 June 1952	TQ8270334321; 51°04′45″N 0°36′25″E		1085238	Upload Photo	Q17547375
The Red House	II*	Goddard's Green			5 July 1993	TQ8235434664; 51°04′56″N 0°36′08″E		1281552	Upload Photo	Q17547665
Staplehurst Lodge	II	Golford Road			5 July 1993	TQ8061534365; 51°04′49″N 0°34′38″E		1336721	Upload Photo	Q26621198
Clevelands	II	Green Lane			20 June 1967	TQ8351934889; 51°05′02″N 0°37′08″E		1085240	Upload Photo	Q26371494
Barn at Mount Pleasant Farm	II	Halden Lane			5 July 1993	TQ8473133998; 51°04′32″N 0°38′08″E		1203696	Upload Photo	Q26499211
Beston Farm Oast	II	Halden Lane			5 July 1993	TQ8450634062; 51°04′34″N 0°37′57″E		1203700	Upload Photo	Q26499215
Beston Farmhouse	II	Halden Lane			5 July 1993	TQ8445134047; 51°04′34″N 0°37′54″E		1336715	Upload Photo	Q26621192
Mount Pleasant Farmhouse	II	Halden Lane			20 June 1967	TQ8473233951; 51°04′31″N 0°38′08″E		1085242	Upload Photo	Q26371506
Oasthouse at Mount Pleasant Farm	II	Halden Lane			5 July 1993	TQ8475733982; 51°04′32″N 0°38′10″E		1085241	Upload Photo	Q26371499
Plummers Barn	II	Halden Lane			18 February 1987	TQ8392434288; 51°04′42″N 0°37′27″E		1281557	Upload Photo	Q26570593
Privy to North West of Beston Farmhouse	II	Halden Lane			5 July 1993	TQ8443234050; 51°04′34″N 0°37′53″E		1085243	Upload Photo	Q26371512
Stable at Mount Pleasant Farm	II	Halden Lane			5 July 1993	TQ8475133970; 51°04′31″N 0°38′09″E		1281555	Upload Photo	Q26570591
Scullsgate Cottage	II	Hinksden Lane			5 July 1993	TQ7925132376; 51°03′46″N 0°33′24″E		1085244	Upload Photo	Q26371517
Upper Scullsgate Cottage	II	Hinksden Lane			5 July 1993	TQ7923932363; 51°03′45″N 0°33′24″E		1281559	Upload Photo	Q26570595
Diprose House	II	Hinksden Road			20 June 1967	TQ7888131701; 51°03′24″N 0°33′04″E		1336716	Upload Photo	Q26621193
The Paper Mill	II*	Hinksden Road			9 June 1952	TQ7852631054; 51°03′04″N 0°32′45″E		1281560	Upload Photo	Q17547671
1-5 Old Weavers Cottage	II	1-5 Old Weavers Cottage, Iden Green			20 June 1967	TQ8059132165; 51°03′38″N 0°34′33″E		1336717	Upload Photo	Q26621194
Barn at Frame Farm Approximately 30 Metres North East of Farmhouse	II	Iden Green			5 July 1993	TQ8058032145; 51°03′37″N 0°34′32″E		1085245	Upload Photo	Q26371523
Cotton Cottage	II	Iden Green			5 July 1993	TQ8058131896; 51°03′29″N 0°34′32″E		1085246	Upload Photo	Q26371528
Coveney Cottages	II	1 and 2, Iden Green			27 May 1992	TQ8051931841; 51°03′27″N 0°34′28″E		1203717	Upload Photo	Q26499232
Frame Farmhouse	II	Iden Green			20 June 1967	TQ8061132129; 51°03′36″N 0°34′34″E		1203707	Upload Photo	Q26499222
Lilac Cottage	II	Iden Green			27 May 1992	TQ8053131854; 51°03′28″N 0°34′29″E		1336718	Upload Photo	Q26621195
Oak Cottage	II	Iden Green			5 July 1993	TQ8037431706; 51°03′23″N 0°34′21″E		1203806	Upload Photo	Q26499314
The Cottage the Stores	II	Iden Green			27 May 1992	TQ8054931873; 51°03′28″N 0°34′30″E		1085247	Upload Photo	Q26371535
Woodside	II	Iden Green			5 July 1993	TQ8087232141; 51°03′36″N 0°34′47″E		1203710	Upload Photo	Q26499225
Benenden Chest Hospital Lister Wing	II	Jackson Way			5 July 1993	TQ8335235181; 51°05′12″N 0°37′00″E		1203809	Upload Photo	Q26499317
Eaglesden	II	Mill Street, Eaglesden			5 July 1993	TQ7991030972; 51°03′00″N 0°33′55″E		1085248	Upload Photo	Q26371539
Mill House	II	Mill Street			5 July 1993	TQ7982930655; 51°02′50″N 0°33′51″E		1336719	Upload Photo	Q26621196
Mill Street Cottage	II	Mill Street			5 July 1993	TQ8031431567; 51°03′18″N 0°34′17″E		1336720	Upload Photo	Q26621197
Mill Street House	II	Mill Street			5 July 1993	TQ7996930876; 51°02′57″N 0°33′58″E		1203828	Upload Photo	Q26499336
Wandle Mill	II	Mill Street			15 June 1989	TQ7976630535; 51°02′46″N 0°33′47″E		1085249	Upload Photo	Q26371546
Watermill House	II*	Mill Street			9 June 1952	TQ7979930517; 51°02′45″N 0°33′49″E		1281500	Upload Photo	Q17547660
Weald House	II	Mill Street, Iden Green			5 July 1993	TQ8034731624; 51°03′20″N 0°34′19″E		1203842	Upload Photo	Q26499348
Weavers	II	Mill Street, Iden Green			5 July 1993	TQ8019431387; 51°03′13″N 0°34′11″E		1085250	Upload Photo	Q26371551
Weavers Cottage	II	Mill Street, Iden Green			5 July 1993	TQ8019831377; 51°03′12″N 0°34′11″E		1203846	Upload Photo	Q26499352
Yew Tree Farmhouse	II	Mill Street, Iden Green			5 July 1993	TQ8030931642; 51°03′21″N 0°34′17″E		1085251	Upload Photo	Q26371556
Beech House	II	1 and 2, New Pond Road			15 June 1989	TQ8077434194; 51°04′43″N 0°34′46″E		1203849	Upload Photo	Q26499355
Primrose Cottages	II	1 and 2, New Pond Road			5 July 1993	TQ8112533867; 51°04′32″N 0°35′03″E		1085212	Upload Photo	Q26371338
The Hop House	II	New Pond Road			5 July 1993	TQ8122933918; 51°04′33″N 0°35′08″E		1336722	Upload Photo	Q26621199
Wall and Gatepiers to Staplehurst Lodge	II	New Pond Road			5 July 1993	TQ8062334361; 51°04′48″N 0°34′38″E		1281471	Upload Photo	Q26570522
Barn at Forest Farm Approximately 20 Metres South East of the Forest	II	Nineveh Lane			5 July 1993	TQ7806532590; 51°03′54″N 0°32′24″E		1085213	Upload Photo	Q26371345
Great Nineveh	II	Nineveh Lane			20 June 1967	TQ7829632239; 51°03′42″N 0°32′35″E		1336742	Upload Photo	Q26621219
The Forest	II	Nineveh Lane			20 June 1967	TQ7804032603; 51°03′55″N 0°32′22″E		1336743	Upload Photo	Q26621220
White Chimneys Cottage	II	Nineveh Lane			9 September 1991	TQ7878132603; 51°03′54″N 0°33′00″E		1336744	Upload Photo	Q26621221
Broomhill	II	Ramsden Lane			20 June 1967	TQ8183431619; 51°03′18″N 0°35′35″E		1085214	Upload Photo	Q26371350
Dingleden House	II	Ramsden Lane			9 June 1952	TQ8166731135; 51°03′03″N 0°35′26″E		1085215	Upload Photo	Q26371356
Barn at West Pullington Approximately 15 Metres North of Pullington House	II	Rolvenden Road			7 July 1989	TQ8148232632; 51°03′52″N 0°35′19″E		1085217	Upload Photo	Q26371366
Beacon Hall Farm Cottages	II	1 and 2, Rolvenden Road			5 July 1993	TQ8242732243; 51°03′38″N 0°36′07″E		1085216	Upload Photo	Q26371359
Beacon Mill Cottage	II	Rolvenden Road			5 July 1993	TQ8214432452; 51°03′45″N 0°35′53″E		1203915	Upload Photo	Q26499415
Beacon Windmill	II	Rolvenden Road	smock mill		9 June 1952	TQ8212632406; 51°03′44″N 0°35′52″E		1085218	Beacon Windmill More images	Q4875975
K6 Telephone Kiosk	II	Rolvenden Road			5 July 1993	TQ8101732844; 51°03′59″N 0°34′56″E		1203953	Upload Photo	Q26499451
Pullington Farmhouse	II	Rolvenden Road			5 July 1993	TQ8171832471; 51°03′46″N 0°35′31″E		1085219	Upload Photo	Q26371376
The Beacon	II	Rolvenden Road			20 June 1967	TQ8220132367; 51°03′42″N 0°35′56″E		1085220	Upload Photo	Q26371383
Tudor Cottage	II	Rolvenden Road			5 July 1993	TQ8113532818; 51°03′58″N 0°35′02″E		1203976	Upload Photo	Q26499475
Whitegates	II	Rolvenden Road			5 July 1993	TQ8262932204; 51°03′36″N 0°36′17″E		1281446	Upload Photo	Q26570498
3 and 4, Standen Street	II	3 and 4, Standen Street			28 March 1988	TQ8073930959; 51°02′58″N 0°34′38″E		1336745	Upload Photo	Q26621222
Barn Approximately 10 Metres East of Tile Farm House	II	Standen Street			5 July 1993	TQ8056331146; 51°03′05″N 0°34′29″E		1203981	Upload Photo	Q26499479
Campion House	II	Standen Street			20 June 1967	TQ8065430844; 51°02′55″N 0°34′33″E		1085221	Upload Photo	Q26371389
Leesden	II	Standen Street			20 June 1967	TQ8092430549; 51°02′45″N 0°34′47″E		1085222	Upload Photo	Q26371396
Little Standen	II	Standen Street			20 June 1967	TQ8085630843; 51°02′54″N 0°34′44″E		1203985	Upload Photo	Q26499483
Old Standen	II*	Standen Street			9 June 1952	TQ8100530517; 51°02′44″N 0°34′51″E		1336746	Upload Photo	Q17547709
Pump House	II	Standen Street, Iden Green			5 July 1993	TQ8036431666; 51°03′22″N 0°34′20″E		1281416	Upload Photo	Q26570468
Springhill	II	Standen Street			20 June 1967	TQ8110030340; 51°02′38″N 0°34′55″E		1281414	Upload Photo	Q26570466
Summerhill	II	Standen Street			5 July 1993	TQ8059131145; 51°03′05″N 0°34′31″E		1085223	Upload Photo	Q26371401
Barn and Oasthouse at Mount Hall Farm	II	Stepneyford Lane			5 July 1993	TQ8283833821; 51°04′29″N 0°36′31″E		1085225	Upload Photo	Q26371413
Colebarn	II	Stepneyford Lane			5 July 1993	TQ8372233926; 51°04′31″N 0°37′16″E		1336747	Upload Photo	Q26621223
Green Lane Farmhouse	II	Stepneyford Lane			8 June 1993	TQ8295432973; 51°04′01″N 0°36′35″E		1281421	Upload Photo	Q26570473
Maplesden	II	Stepneyford Lane			5 July 1993	TQ8351533187; 51°04′07″N 0°37′04″E		1085224	Upload Photo	Q26371407
Mount Hall Farmhouse	II	Stepneyford Lane			5 July 1993	TQ8286833840; 51°04′29″N 0°36′32″E		1204023	Upload Photo	Q26499516
Mount Le Hoe	II	Stepneyford Lane			5 July 1993	TQ8277433674; 51°04′24″N 0°36′27″E		1336748	Upload Photo	Q26621224
Oasthouses at Maplesden	II	Stepneyford Lane			5 July 1993	TQ8348533190; 51°04′07″N 0°37′03″E		1204017	Upload Photo	Q26499511
Pagehurst Cottages	II	Stepneyford Lane			5 July 1993	TQ8282933775; 51°04′27″N 0°36′30″E		1085226	Upload Photo	Q26371418
Ashlawn	II	The Green			5 July 1993	TQ8081532824; 51°03′59″N 0°34′45″E		1204029	Upload Photo	Q26499520
Benenden C P Primary School	II	The Green			5 July 1993	TQ8082632744; 51°03′56″N 0°34′46″E		1336749	Upload Photo	Q26621225
Bull Inn	II	The Green			21 August 1989	TQ8098432844; 51°03′59″N 0°34′54″E		1204047	Upload Photo	Q26499536
Chest Tomb Approximately 5 Metres South of South Chapel at St George's Church	II	The Green			5 July 1993	TQ8085432642; 51°03′53″N 0°34′47″E		1281235	Upload Photo	Q26570299
Chest Tomb Approximately 8 Metres South of Turret to South Chapel at St George's Church	II	The Green			5 July 1993	TQ8083832630; 51°03′52″N 0°34′46″E		1085228	Upload Photo	Q26371429
Chest Tomb South East of St Georges Church	II	The Green			5 July 1993	TQ8087532664; 51°03′53″N 0°34′48″E		1281241	Upload Photo	Q26570305
Church Cottages	II	The Green			5 July 1993	TQ8079832704; 51°03′55″N 0°34′44″E		1204055	Upload Photo	Q26499544
Church of St George	II*	The Green	church building		2 June 1967	TQ8084032670; 51°03′54″N 0°34′46″E		1204075	Church of St George More images	Q17547441
Lychgate to St George's Church and Churchyard Walls	II	The Green			5 July 1993	TQ8083032694; 51°03′54″N 0°34′46″E		1085229	Upload Photo	Q26371436
Memorial Hall	II	The Green			5 July 1993	TQ8084932869; 51°04′00″N 0°34′47″E		1336750	Upload Photo	Q26621226
Monument to Thomas Neve Approximately 15 Metres North of West Tower at St George's Church	II	The Green			5 July 1993	TQ8081432685; 51°03′54″N 0°34′45″E		1204362	Upload Photo	Q26499819
Monument to William Spencer Approximately 8 Metres South of East Corner of South Chapel at St George's Church	II	The Green			5 July 1993	TQ8080432626; 51°03′52″N 0°34′44″E		1336751	Upload Photo	Q26621227
Stable and Hayloft Approximately 20 Metres to South West of Bull Inn	II	The Green			25 March 1986	TQ8096032837; 51°03′59″N 0°34′53″E		1085227	Upload Photo	Q26371424
Baldwins General Stores Kingsford Cottage	II	2, The Street			20 June 1967	TQ8096132888; 51°04′00″N 0°34′53″E		1085230	Upload Photo	Q26371441
Benenden Playgroup	II	The Street			5 July 1993	TQ8065033043; 51°04′06″N 0°34′37″E		1336770	Upload Photo	Q26621247
Chestnut House	II	The Street			5 July 1993	TQ8092832904; 51°04′01″N 0°34′51″E		1085193	Upload Photo	Q26371231
Cleveland Cottage	II	The Street			5 July 1993	TQ8079132983; 51°04′04″N 0°34′44″E		1085194	Upload Photo	Q26371237
Clevelands	II	The Street			20 June 1967	TQ8089932930; 51°04′02″N 0°34′50″E		1336732	Upload Photo	Q26685018
Fir Tree Cottage Ward and Sons Butchers	II	The Street			5 July 1993	TQ8063433012; 51°04′05″N 0°34′36″E		1085195	Upload Photo	Q26371243
Gable Cottage the Gables	II	The Street			5 July 1993	TQ8075532954; 51°04′03″N 0°34′42″E		1336733	Upload Photo	Q26621210
Gibbon's School	II	The Street			9 June 1952	TQ8094332901; 51°04′01″N 0°34′52″E		1085196	Upload Photo	Q26371247
Hurstdene	II	The Street			5 July 1993	TQ8099132885; 51°04′00″N 0°34′54″E		1085197	Upload Photo	Q26371254
Ivydene Mersham Cottage the Beauty Box	II	The Street			5 July 1993	TQ8075932988; 51°04′04″N 0°34′43″E		1085198	Upload Photo	Q26371260
Kingsford Cottages	II	3, 4, 5, The Street			20 June 1967	TQ8097132882; 51°04′00″N 0°34′53″E		1204380	Upload Photo	Q26499831
Laurel Cottages	II	1-4, The Street			5 July 1993	TQ8068233018; 51°04′05″N 0°34′39″E		1336712	Upload Photo	Q26621189
Laurel House	II	The Street			20 June 1967	TQ8065233008; 51°04′05″N 0°34′37″E		1204483	Upload Photo	Q26499922
Nos 3 4 5 Outbuilding to Rear	II	The Street			5 July 1993	TQ8097632897; 51°04′01″N 0°34′54″E		1085192	Upload Photo	Q26371226
The Kitty Fisher	II	The Street, TN17 4DJ	pub		5 July 1993	TQ8081932931; 51°04′02″N 0°34′46″E		1085199	The Kitty Fisher More images	Q26371267
The Queen's Well	II	The Street			5 July 1993	TQ8062433047; 51°04′06″N 0°34′36″E		1085200	Upload Photo	Q26371273
The Sweet Shop	II	The Street			5 July 1993	TQ8083032926; 51°04′02″N 0°34′46″E		1204485	Upload Photo	Q26499924
War Memorial	II	The Street	statue		5 July 1993	TQ8101132862; 51°04′00″N 0°34′55″E		1085201	War Memorial More images	Q26371278
Brick Kiln	II	Walkhurst Road			5 July 1993	TQ8133133110; 51°04′07″N 0°35′12″E		1204532	Upload Photo	Q26499969
Burnt House	II	Walkhurst Road			5 July 1993	TQ8157433328; 51°04′14″N 0°35′25″E		1336734	Upload Photo	Q26621211
Coggers	II*	Walkhurst Road			20 June 1967	TQ8169433790; 51°04′29″N 0°35′32″E		1085203	Upload Photo	Q17547372
Feoffee Cottages	II	1-6, Walkhurst Road			17 March 1981	TQ8125833055; 51°04′06″N 0°35′08″E		1085202	Upload Photo	Q26371283
Former Oasthouse to West of Yew Tree House	II	Walkhurst Road			5 July 1993	TQ8100432933; 51°04′02″N 0°34′55″E		1085204	Upload Photo	Q26371290
Little Walkhurst	II	Walkhurst Road			5 July 1993	TQ8148633305; 51°04′13″N 0°35′21″E		1204536	Upload Photo	Q26499973
Scribbins	II	Walkhurst Road			5 July 1993	TQ8154833342; 51°04′14″N 0°35′24″E		1336735	Upload Photo	Q26621212
Yew Tree House	II	Walkhurst Road			20 June 1967	TQ8103832927; 51°04′02″N 0°34′57″E		1204542	Upload Photo	Q26499978
Moorwood Cottage	II	Woodcock Lane			8 June 1993	TQ8087131345; 51°03′11″N 0°34′45″E		1281169	Upload Photo	Q26570240
The Woodcock Public House	II	Woodcock Lane	pub		5 July 1993	TQ8065231338; 51°03′11″N 0°34′34″E		1085205	The Woodcock Public House More images	Q26371295

== See also ==
- Grade I listed buildings in Kent
- Grade II* listed buildings in Kent

== Sources ==
- Newman, John (2012) [1969], Kent: West and the Weald, The Buildings of England, New Haven and London: Yale University Press, ISBN 978-0-300-18509-6
