= David Brandon (architect) =

Scottish architect (1813–1897)

- Born: 13 December 1813; Scotland
- Died: 10 January 1897 (aged 83)
- Occupation: Architect
- Awards: RIBA
- Buildings: Sidbury Manor

David Brandon (13 December 1813 – 10 January 1897) was a Scottish architect. In partnership with Thomas Wyatt, he worked mostly in the Gothic style.

He was articled to George Smith from 1828 to 1833. Five years later he entered into partnership with Wyatt, a partnership that lasted thirteen years until dissolved in 1851. He subsequently worked alone but took Samuel Tucker as an apprentice 1867 until before 1871. As a fellow of the Royal Institute of British Architects he is recorded as having proposed both John Macvicar Anderson and Henry Saxon Snell for Fellowship.

Brandon worked at a number of English country houses and churches, these include: Badminton House, Basildon Park, Bayham Abbey, Hemsted House, Chilham Castle, Fonthill Abbey, Hensol Castle, Highnam Court, Hanley Castle and Williamstrip Park. He is credited with Carmarthen's Joint Counties Lunatic Asylum (1865).

His ecclesiastical work includes restoration of St. Mary's Church, Atherstone in 1849, Holy Trinity Church at Markbeech, Kent (1852), St Mary's Church at East Worldham, Hampshire (1865), St George, Benenden and a private chapel at Bayham Abbey (1870).

Brandon died on 10 January 1897.
