= Eldon, County Durham =

Village in County Durham, England

Coordinates: 54°38′27.38″N 1°38′23.95″W

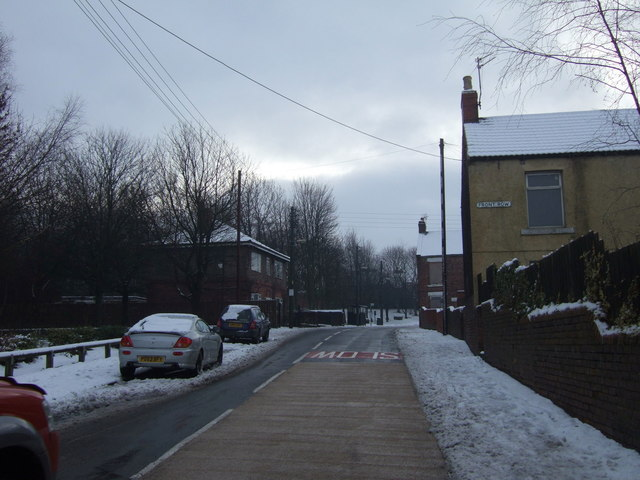
Eldon Bank

Eldon is a village in County Durham, England. It is situated a few miles south-west of Bishop Auckland, a short distance from Shildon. It gives its name to the peerage of the Earls of Eldon.

The village became a civil parish, with a parish council, on 1 April 2003. It had previously been part of Shildon parish. The population of this civil parish as at the 2011 census was 327.
