= Beacon Mill, Benenden =

Windmill in Benenden, Kent, England

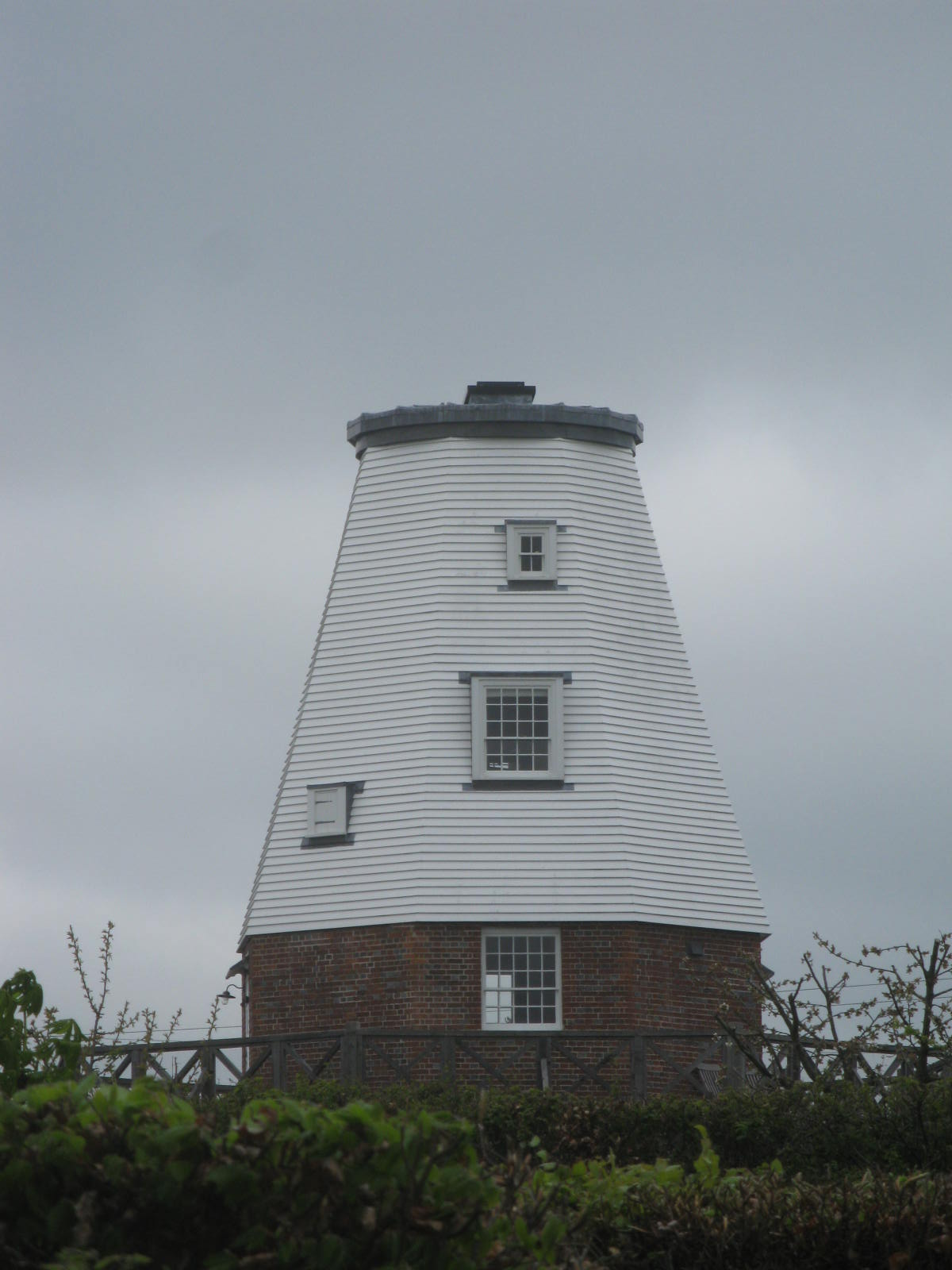
- The mill in May 2016
- Interactive map of Beacon Mill, Benenden

Origin
- Grid reference: TQ 822 325
- Coordinates: 51°3′43.5″N 0°35′52″E
- Year built: Early nineteenth century

Information
- Purpose: Corn milling
- Type: Smock mill
- Storeys: Three storeys
- Base storeys: Two storeys
- Smock sides: Eight-sided
- No. of sails: Four
- Type of sails: Single Patent sails
- Windshaft: Cast iron
- Winding: Fantail
- Fantail blades: Eight blades
- No. of pairs of millstones: Three pairs
- Size of millstones: 4 feet (1.22 m) diameter

Beacon Mill is a Grade II listed smock mill in Benenden, Kent, England which is in need of restoration. The mill has been out of use since 1923 and is privately owned.

== History ==
Beacon Mill is one of two windmills marked on the 1819-43 Ordnance Survey map. It was also marked on Greenwood's 1821 map. Towards the end of the nineteenth century, Beacon Mill was run in conjunction with Wandle Mill, on the River Rother. The mill was last worked for trade in 1921 and the sails and fantail were removed in 1923. Two of the sails were re-erected on the White Mill at Headcorn. The other pair were intended for re-use on the Union Mill, Cranbrook but proved unsuitable for that mill. A pair of 4-foot (1.22 m) diameter millstones from the mill were installed in the Union Mill at Cranbrook. Some repairs were carried out to the mill in 1950 to make it waterproof. On 3 December 1977 the cap suffered damage in a storm, and most of the roof was subsequently removed. The remains of the cap, and the windshaft had been removed by 1981. The mill was clad in plywood in the early 1980s in an effort to keep the weather out. It retains the plywood cladding today.

== Description ==
Beacon Mill has a three-storey smock on a two-storey brick base. It was approximately 50 feet (15.24 m) high overall (to the roof of the cap). It had four single Patent sails mounted on a cast-iron windshaft and was winded by a fantail. There was a wide wooden stage at first-floor level. The Brake Wheel was 10 feet (3.05 m) diameter, driving a 5 feet (1.52 m) diameter Wallower. The Brake Wheel was wood, as is the Wallower and Upright Shaft. whilst the Great Spur Wheel is cast iron with wooden cogs.

== Millers ==
- William Oxley
- Richard Reeves 1839-47
- John Barton
- Richard Corke
- F Richardson
- Thomas Collins Sr. - 1884
- Thomas Collins Jr. 1884 - 99
- Robert Burgess 1899 - 1921
