= Hemsted Park =

Country estate and manor house in Kent, England

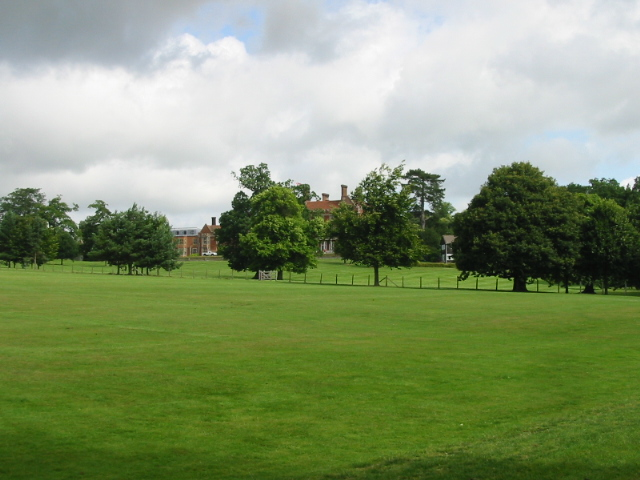
Parkland at Hemsted Park with the main building of Benenden School beyond the trees

Hemsted Park, historically sometimes known as Hempsted Park, is a 100 hectares (250 acres) former country estate and manor house north-west of the village of Benenden in the English county of Kent. It is the site of Benenden School, an independent boarding school for girls. The school operates a commercial arts programme using the name Hemsted Park.

The park was the seat of the Guldeford baronets until 1718. Hemsted House, which stands in the grounds and is the main building of the school, is a 19th century house. It was built in an Elizabethan style in the early 1860s and remodelled at the beginning of the 20th century.

A single first-class cricket match was held on a ground at the park in 1843.

== History ==
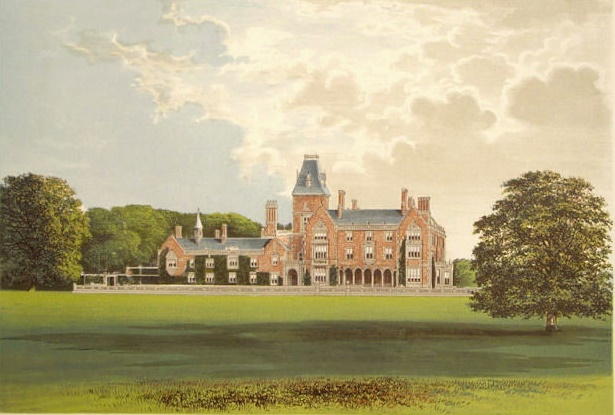
Hemsted Park painted in around 1870 by Alexander Francis Lydon.

The park has a Roman settlement within its boundaries and is at the junction of two Roman roads – one from Ashford and the other from Rochester. There are nearby Romano-British settlements. There is reference to the "dene of Hemsted" in a charter of 993 issued by Æthelred the Unready, but the earliest available records show the land in the possession of Odo, Earl of Kent, the man believed to have commissioned the Bayeux Tapestry, having been given it―amongst much other property in the county―by his half-brother William the Conqueror after the Norman Conquest. The first property on the site was a house built by Robert of Hemsted which is first recorded in 1216 and was moated in the 12th century.

In 1388, Richard II granted the manor to William of Guldeford, the first of the Guldeford baronets of Hemsted who made changes to the original house. Richard Guldeford fought with King Henry VII at the Battle of Bosworth Field in 1485. A deer park was enclosed during the Tudor period to create an area of parkland. Queen Elizabeth I visited Thomas Guldeford at the house and he was knighted by her at Rye a few days later.

In the early 18th century the property was sold to Admiral Sir John Norris, the commander-in-chief of George II's navy. He was instrumental in landscaping the estate, enlarging the park and forming much of the parkland as it is now. The house was sold to Thomas Hallett Hodges, who was High Sheriff of Kent in 1786, in 1780. He reduced the size of the hall, removing two wings of the brick built house, one of which had two octagonal towers, filled in the moat that had until that point encircled it and created the lake in the grounds. Hodges' son, Thomas Law Hodges inherited the house in 1801 and began to develop the grounds of the park, planting trees across it.

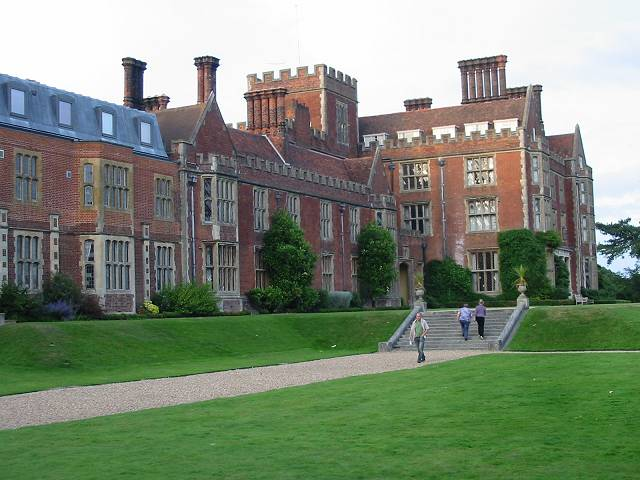
The main building at Benenden School, dating from the 1860s

The Elizabethan property was demolished between 1860 and 1862 following the acquisition of the estate by Lord Cranbrook in 1857 after Hodges' death. He commissioned the building of a new house, the basis of the current Hemsted House, employing David Brandon, president of the Royal Institute of British Architects to design the new mansion which was built a little to the east of the original buildings. Traces of the original buildings and moat remain on the site. The grounds of the park were relandscaped during the same period by William Broderick Thomas and much of the village of Benenden was also remodelled at the same time. Landscaping included the creation of one of the first avenues of Japanese red cedar trees in the United Kingdom and the area of Hemsted Forest, north of the park, was purchased by Cranbrook and became part of the park. The forest is now owned and managed by the Forestry Commission.

The house, which featured a prominent tower and was described as having "alarming vitality", was built in an Elizabethan style and was subsequently remodelled in 1912 by Herbert Cescinsky at the behest of its new owner, newspaper magnate and later Lord Rothermere, Harold Harmsworth. The remodelling saw the "vitality" toned down and the upper levels of the tower removed. The main house itself, as well as a number of the out-building and lodges, are Grade II listed buildings. The grounds include a number of formal garden areas, as well as ornamental parkland and plantings of trees and a 19th century walled kitchen garden. Many of the trees in the park were lost during the Great Storm of 1987.

Rothermere sold the Hemsted estate in 1924, dividing it up into lots, reducing the size of the estate itself from 2,000 hectares (4,900 acres) to eventually cover around 119 hectares (290 acres). The house itself was initially rented by Benenden School before being purchased the following year. The school was evacuated during World War II and the house used as a military hospital. Buildings have been added to the school site throughout the time it has occupied the park. In 2023, shortly after the opening of a purpose-built concert hall and music school on the site, the school established a commercial arts programme using the brand name Hemsted Park.

== Cricket ground ==
Hemsted Park
- Interactive map of Hemsted Park

Ground information
- Location: Benenden, Kent
- Country: England
- Coordinates: 51.074°N 0.573°E (approx.)

Team information
Benenden Cricket Club	(1835–1843)
Kent County Cricket Club	(1843)
- As of 6 September 2010; Source: CricketArchive

A cricket pitch was laid out at Hemsted Park (Note: CricInfo and CricketArchive both call the ground Hensted Park in their databases and place it at Benenden. Other sources, including Kent County Cricket Club, Benenden Cricket Club and the contemporary report of the match in The Sporting Magazine, call the ground Hemsted (or Hempsted) Park. Given the geography it seems reasonable to assume that the database(s) used by CricInfo and CricketArchive have a transcription error and that the local and contemporary sources are more reliable) during the early 19th century by the Hodges family and used for a number of "society matches". A match in 1835 between a team assembled by Thomas Twisden Hodges and one from Sheldwich Lees representing Lord Sondes was watched by over 6,000 spectators and the ground was the home ground of Benenden Cricket Club, who were a significant team in Kent at the time, between 1835 and 1843. The ground

The only recorded first-class cricket match on the ground was in 1843, when Kent County Cricket Club played an England team in a benefit match for Ned Wenman. Wenman was born in Benenden, worked as a wheelwright and was an amateur cricketer, being particularly noted as an excellent wicket-keeper. Wenman was about to retire from first-class cricket, although he later returned to the game and played until 1854. The match was hosted by the park owner Thomas Law Hodges who arranged a dinner after the match for "nearly 200 gentlemen".

The match was the third match of the season between Kent and England. Kent won, scoring 199 runs in their two innings whilst England scored 100 runs. The occasion was described:

...every arrangement was made for the accommodation of the numerous visitors, several marquees and booths having been erected around the circle enclosed for the play

–The Sporting Magazine, 1843

The match was the only time that Kent used the ground. It no longer exists as a cricket ground, having been removed during the re-landscaping of the park in the late 19th century, and the exact location of the ground within the park is unknown. Benenden Cricket Club returned to their ground on the village green after the 1843 match.
