= Benenden =

Village in Kent, England

Coordinates: 51.0675°N 0.5782°E

- Location within Kent
- Population: 2,375 (2011 Census)
- OS grid reference: TQ807329
- Civil parish: Benenden
- District: Tunbridge Wells
- Shire county: Kent
- Region: South East
- Country: England
- Sovereign state: United Kingdom
- Post town: Cranbrook
- Postcode district: TN17
- Dialling code: 01580
- Police: Kent
- Fire: Kent
- Ambulance: South East Coast
- UK Parliament: Weald of Kent

Benenden is a village and civil parish in the borough of Tunbridge Wells in Kent, England. The parish is located on the Weald, 6 miles (10 km) to the west of Tenterden. In addition to the main village, Iden Green, East End, Dingleden and Standen Street settlements are included in the parish.

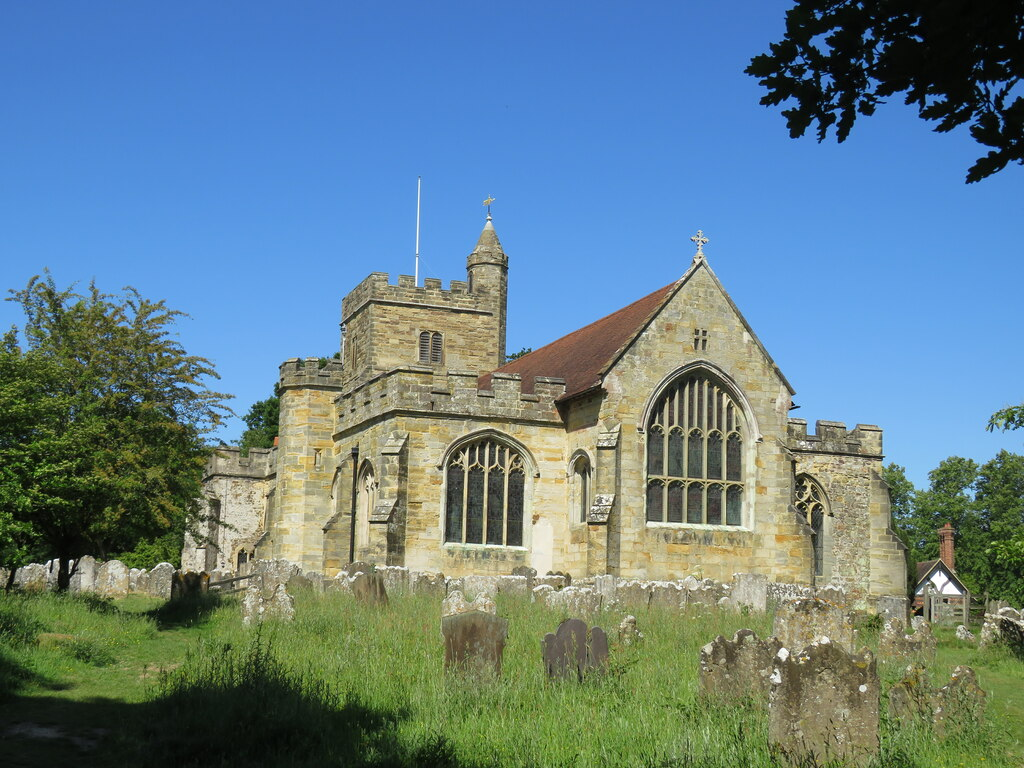
St George's Church, Benenden, Benenden

The parish church is dedicated to St George, and is a 19th-century building on the site of a medieval building destroyed in a fire. Benenden School, a private girls boarding school is located to the north of the village.

== Origin of name ==
The place name of Benenden (pronounced Ben-en-den) derives from Old English meaning Bynna's wooded pasture. Bynning denn became Benindene (1086) Binnigdaenne, Bennedene (c1100) Bynindenne (1253) then the current spelling from 1610.

== History ==
The Wealden iron industry existed in the area from before the Roman period, but evidence of two Roman roads built to take the iron from the Weald have been discovered, as well as other finds from the period such as a Roman settlement at Hemsted, now Benenden School. The evidence of one road, that between Maidstone and Bodiam at Iden Green, is in the form of a paved ford.

The Domesday Book surveyors remarked that Benindene was one of only four places in the Weald to have a church; although like most of the other such, the buildings of the settlement were scattered. From the 14th century places such as Benenden became of industrial importance. The Wealden ironmasters continued what the Romans had done; and the other major industry, cloth-making, also helped to make the village prosperous. By the late 18th century, however, both industries had moved to the industrial north, and Benenden's prosperity was at an end. Benenden had four mills at various times. Wandle Mill, a watermill on the River Rother; East End Mill, a post mill at the site later occupied by the chest hospital, demolished c.1870; and a pair of mills to the east of the village, one of which, Beacon Mill is still standing.

In 1860 Gathorne Hardy, later to become the 1st Earl of Cranbrook (1814–1906), a prominent politician, rebuilt the house in Hemsted Park, one of the Tudor buildings; in 1912 Lord Rothermere made further alterations. It now houses Benenden School

In 1907 a consortium of trade unions and friendly societies established a chest hospital in Goddard's Green Road, Benenden for the treatment of tuberculosis. Today the hospital is an independent organisation, for most medical and surgical specialities and mainly treats members of The Benenden Healthcare Society as well as some NHS and private patients.

On 3 August 1943, Free French pilot Jean Maridor intercepted a German V-1 flying bomb flying in the direction of Benenden. Having made repeated attempts to bring it down he finally destroyed it at such close range that the resulting explosion tore the right wing off his aircraft resulting in a fatal crash close to Benenden school, at that time being used as a wartime hospital. Maridor's remains were found with the wreckage. Maridor was buried near London and repatriated to France in 1948.

The village hall was funded by Lord Rothermere and opened in 1977. It has an asymmetric timber frame design by Sykes Ellis Partnership.

== Benenden School ==
A girls' private school, Benenden School is located to the north of the main village. The school's alumnae include Princess Anne, Lettice Curtis, Sue Ryder and Rachel Weisz.

== See also ==
- Listed buildings in Benenden
