= St George, Benenden =

Church in Benenden, Kent, England

Coordinates: 51.0649°N 0.5795°E

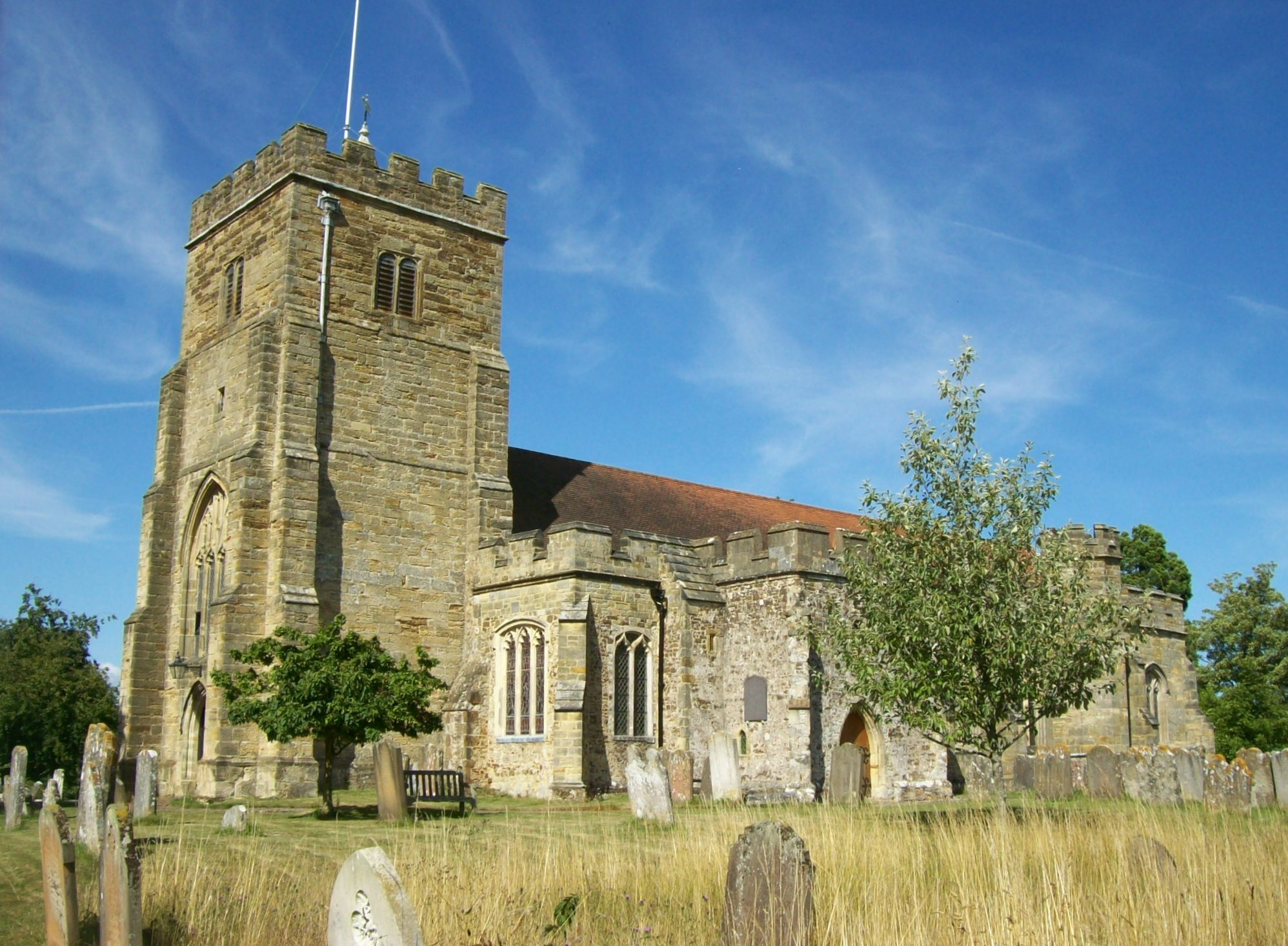
St George's Church, Benenden

St George's Church, Benenden is a Church of England church in Benenden, Kent. The building is Grade II* listed with Historic England.
