= Wealden cloth industry =

Cloth industry in England

Cloth-making was, apart from iron-making, the other large-scale industry carried out on the Weald of Kent and Sussex in medieval times. The ready availability of wool from the sheep of the Romney Marsh, and the immigration from Flanders in the fourteenth century of cloth-workers – places like Cranbrook attracted hundreds of such skilled workers – ensured its place in Kentish industrial history. The industry spread along the Weald, and as far north as Maidstone.

It was helped by the fact that Fuller's earth deposits existed between Boxley and Maidstone: it being an essential raw material for de-greasing the wool. At the time the export of it was forbidden, lest it help their rivals.

Once the wool had been carded (to get rid of the tangles) and spun (both these processes could be done in the workpeople's own homes), it then required weaving. Since that process required looms and the space to do it, 'clothier's halls' were required. These were, as is shown by the timber-framed clothier's hall at Biddenden, often the length of the attics in the master clothier's house. After weaving it was fulled (using the Fuller's earth), and then dried. Once dry, the cloth was brushed with teasels to get rid of loose threads; and finally the shearman cut off loose and projecting pieces of wool.

Regulations ensured the size and quality of the cloth offered for sale. Although regulation width was normally 63 inches (1.75 yards or 160 cm), Kentish broadcloth was only 58 inches (147 cm) wide. One piece was between 30–34 yards (27.5–31 m); and should weigh 66 pounds (30 kg). Officials known as 'ulnagers' were employed to pass each piece. The price of Kentish cloth at the start of the 17th century was £12–16 per piece. One yard of cloth would be equal to a farmworker's wage for 2–3 weeks.

There is also a clothier's house in Cranbrook. It has a separate building to house the looms.

== See also ==
- Worshipful Company of Clothworkers
- Cloth hall
- tenterhook
