= Guldeford baronets =

Extinct baronetcy in the Baronetage of England

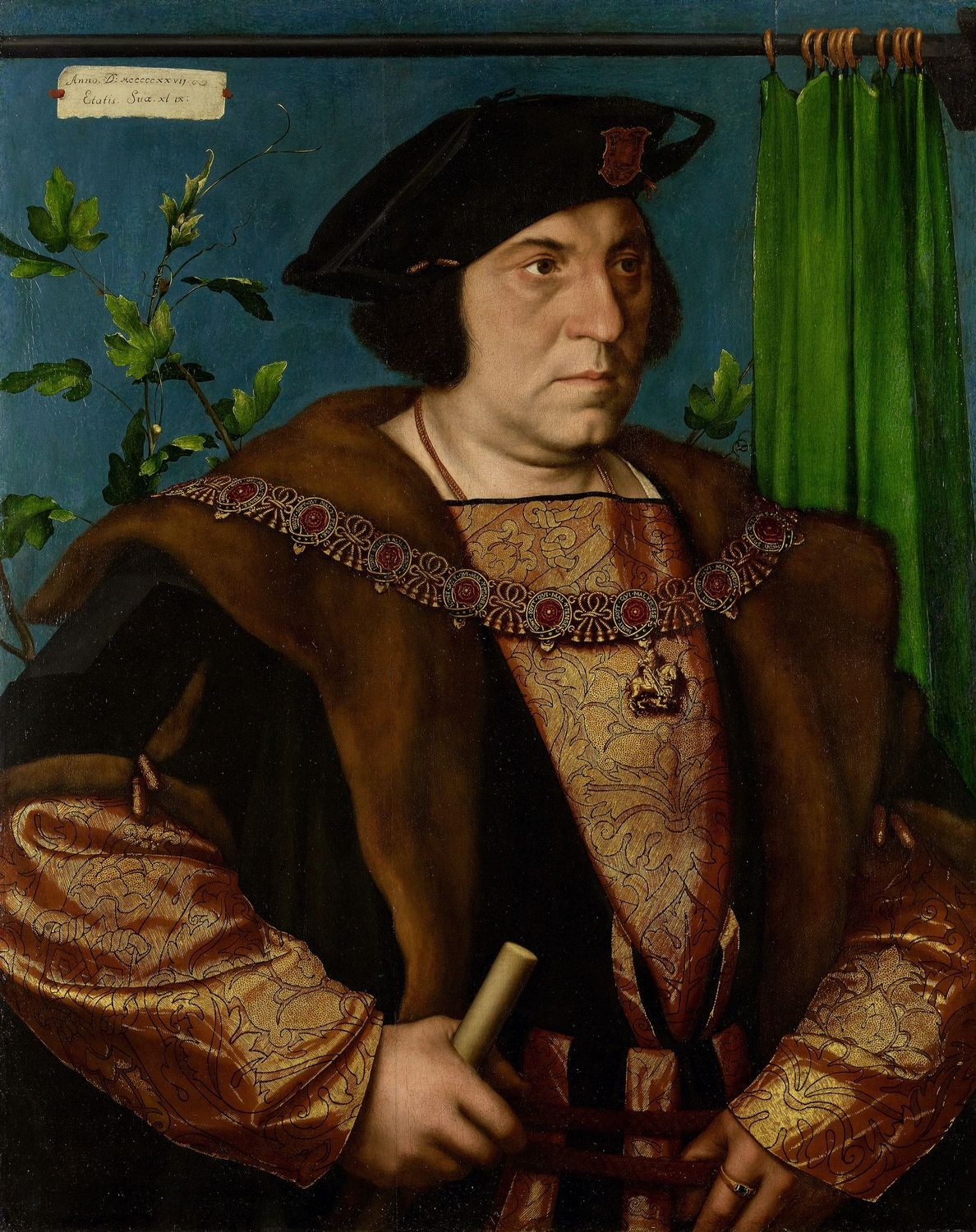
Sir Henry Guildford by Hans Holbein the Younger

The Guldeford Baronetcy, of Hempsted Place in the County of Kent, was a title in the Baronetage of England. It was created on 4 February 1686 for Robert Guldeford. The title became extinct on his death in circa 1740. The Guldeford (or Guildford) family descended from Sir John Guldeford (d. 1493), Comptroller of the Household during the reign of King Edward IV. After supporting the Earl of Richmond (later Henry VII), Sir John and his son, Sir Richard Guildford, were attainted by Parliament. However, they were restored to favour after the accession of Henry in 1485. Sir Richard gained prominence under Henry and notably served as Master of the Ordnance. By his first wife Sir Richard was the father of Sir Edward Guildford, Lord Warden of the Cinque Ports and Master of the Ordnance, whose daughter Jane Guildford married John Dudley, 1st Duke of Northumberland. Sir Richard Guildford's second son by his first wife, George Guildford, of Hempstead Place, Kent, was the father of Sir John Guldford, High Sheriff of Kent during the reign of Edward VI. Sir John's son Sir Thomas Guldford entertained Elizabeth I in 1575. Sir Thomas was the great-great-grandfather of Sir Robert Guldford, 1st Baronet.

Sir Henry Guildford, the son of Sir Richard Guildford by his second wife Joan, served as Comptroller of the Household and Master of the Horse under Henry VIII.

== Guldeford baronets, of Hempsted Place (1686) ==
- Sir Robert Guldeford, 1st Baronet (died c. 1740)
