= Thomas Balston =

British publisher, artist (1883–1967)

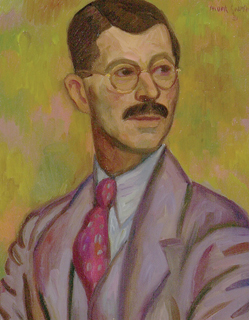
Thomas Balston. Mark Gertler, oil on canvas, 1921. Ashmolean Museum, Oxford.

Thomas Balston OBE MC (30 July 1883 – 4 October 1967) was a director of the publishers Duckworth and Co., and a noted scholar of English book production and illustration. He was also an amateur painter, having studied under Mark Gertler.

== Early years and education ==
Balston was born at Bearsted House, Bearsted, Kent, fourth son of University College, Oxford-educated William Edward Balston and Emily Julia (née Whitehead). The Balston family had been paper-makers since the 18th century, entering business with the Whatman paper-making family. Their success in business led to social prominence and the Balstons were regarded as being amongst the gentry of their county. His paternal great-uncle was Rev. Edward Balston, headmaster of Eton from 1862 to 1868.

Balston was educated at Eton and New College, Oxford. Before being called to the bar in 1909, he served as tutor to Count Gianbattista Spaletti and his brother Count Cesare Spaletti in Italy. From 1912 to 1914, he was secretary to the publisher T. Fisher Unwin.

== Military career ==
Balston was awarded the Military Cross and an O.B.E. by 1940, at which time he was a Major on the Army's General List, having served during the First World War with the 12th Gloucestershire Regiment in France and Belgium from 1914 to 1919, as a staff captain with the 96th Infantry Brigade from 1915 to 1917, and as Deputy Assistant Adjutant General to the 3rd Division and 3rd Brigade from 1917 to 1918 and 1918 to 1919 respectively. His service in the Second World War came to an end when he was invalided out after three months due to suffering from pneumonia, having been called to Southern Command as a staff captain.

== Book illustration ==
At Duckworth from 1921 to 1934, Balston promoted the work of English wood engravers. He produced several books on the history of the subject.

== Death ==
Balston died in 1967. He bequeathed his collection of pictures, drawings, and prints to The Art Fund, the Victoria and Albert Museum, the Ashmolean Museum and other public institutions in Britain.

== Papers ==
Papers from Thomas Balston relating to the Sitwells, published by Duckworths, are held at Washington State University. A small collection of Balston papers relating to John Martin are held at the Louis Round Wilson Special Collections Library.

== Selected publications ==
=== Books ===
- Sitwelliana. 1915–1927. A Handlist. Duckworth, London, 1928. (Compiler)
- The Life of Jonathan Martin, Incendiary of York Minster: With Some Account of Richard and William Martin. London: Macmillan, 1945.
- John Martin, 1789–1854. His Life and Works. Duckworth, London, 1947.
- The Wood Engravings of Robert Gibbings. Art and Technics, London, 1949. (Later edition Dent)
- English Wood Engraving, 1900–1950. Art and Technics, London, 1951.
- William Balston: Paper Maker, 1759–1849. Methuen, London, 1954.
- The Housekeeping Book of Susanna Whatman 1776-1800. Geoffrey Bles, London, 1956. (Editor) Wood engravings by Frank Martin.
- James Whatman: Father & Son. Methuen, London, 1957.

=== Articles ===
- "Illustrated Series of the Nineties", The Book Collector's Quarterly, 1933
