= Medway watermills (lower tributaries) =

Watermills on the River Medway in England

The River Medway and its tributaries and sub-tributaries have been used for more than 1,150 years as a source of power. There are over two hundred sites where the use of water power is known. Many different processes were performed by the use of water power:- corn milling, fulling, paper making, iron smelting, pumping water, making gunpowder, vegetable-oil extraction, and electricity generation. Today, there is just one watermill working for trade. Those that remain have mostly been converted. Such conversions include a garage, dwellings, restaurants, museums and a wedding venue. Some watermills are mere derelict shells, lower walls or lesser remains. Of the majority, there is nothing to be seen. A large number of tributaries feed into the River Medway. The tributaries that powered watermills will be described in the order that they feed in. The mills are described in order from source to mouth. Left bank and right bank are referred to as though the reader is facing downstream. This article deals with the watermills on the tributaries that feed in below Yalding.

== Wateringbury Stream. ==
The Wateringbury Stream enters the Medway from the left at Wateringbury. A site close to the source of the Wateringbury Stream shows some characteristic signs of previous use of waterpower.

=== Swanton, Mereworth ===
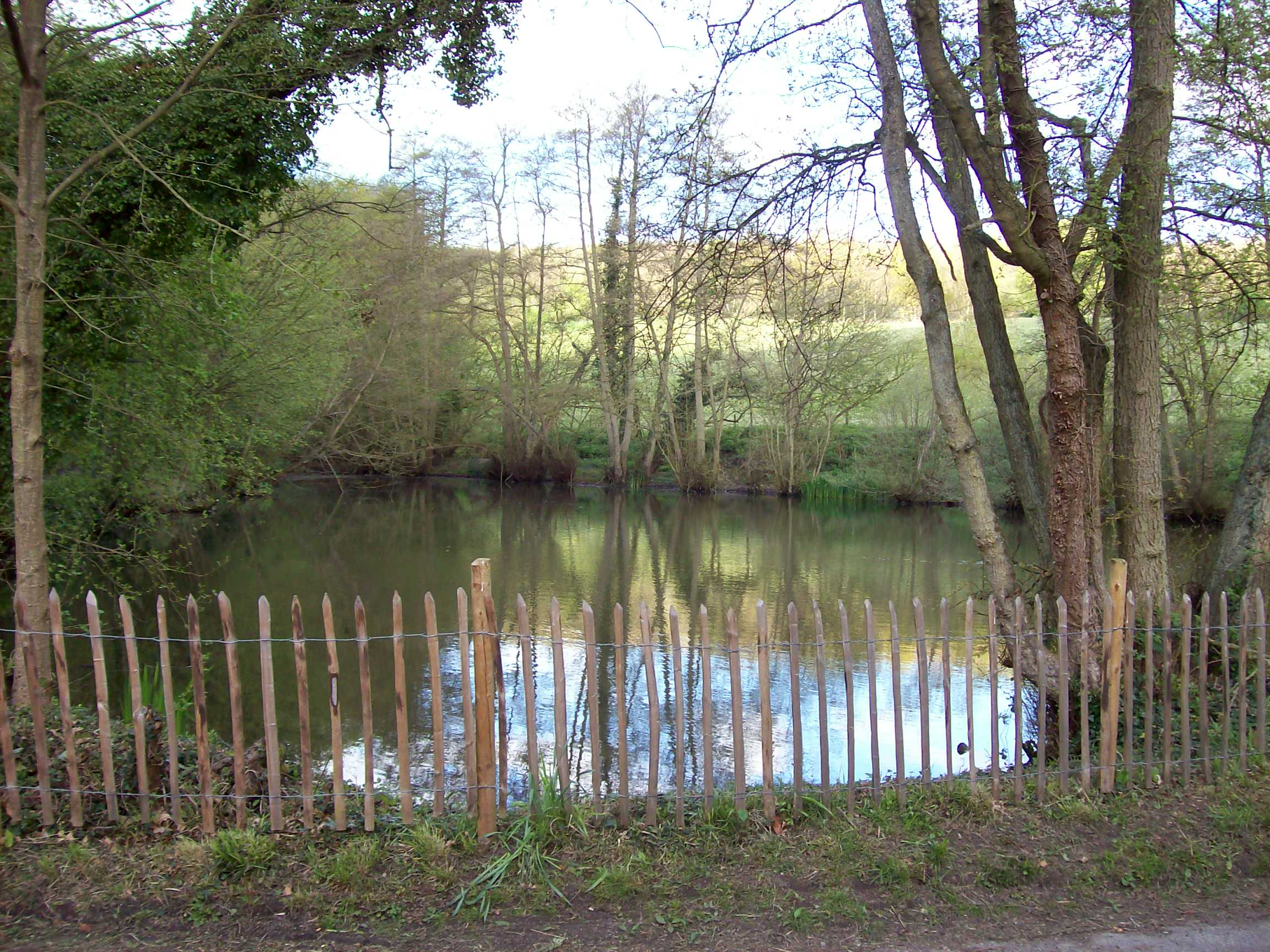
Swanton Valley pond

TQ 646 539 51°15′37″N 0°21′36″E

A large pond high in the Swanton valley may indicate the site of an old furnace mill. The head available being sufficient to power a large overshot waterwheel.

=== Mereworth Mill. ===
TQ 673 535 51°15′22″N 0°23′55″E

The Domesday Book records two mills, value 10/-, at Marovrde (Mereworth). The site of the last mill now lies in the grounds of Mereworth Castle. In 1460, the mill was held by Thomas Hunte. In 1521 it was a fulling mill, belonging to Sir Thomas Nevyle. In 1772 James Pound was the occupant, followed by his widow in March 1780 and John Pound in September 1780. He was at the mill until October 1791. Thomas Edmead was at the mill from 1792-1827. The mill was purchased by Viscount Falmouth c.1856. The mill was demolished by 1907 and the site is today marked by a waterfall at the eastern end of the lakes in the grounds of Mereworth Castle. The head would have been some 8 feet (2.44 m) or 10 feet (3.05 m), suggesting a high breast shot or overshot waterwheel.^{B}^{,} ^{C}

=== Mill at Wateringbury ===
The Domesday Book records three mills at Otringeberge (Wateringbury). Two mills were held by Ralf, son of Turald and valued at 3/-, a third was held by Hugh de Braibourne and worth 16d. This mill was marked on C & G Greenwood's map of Kent, 1822. It was not mentioned in a survey of the parish carried out in 1828.^{C}

=== Brattle (Upper) Mill, Wateringbury ===
TQ 686 534 51°15′17″N 0°25′02″E

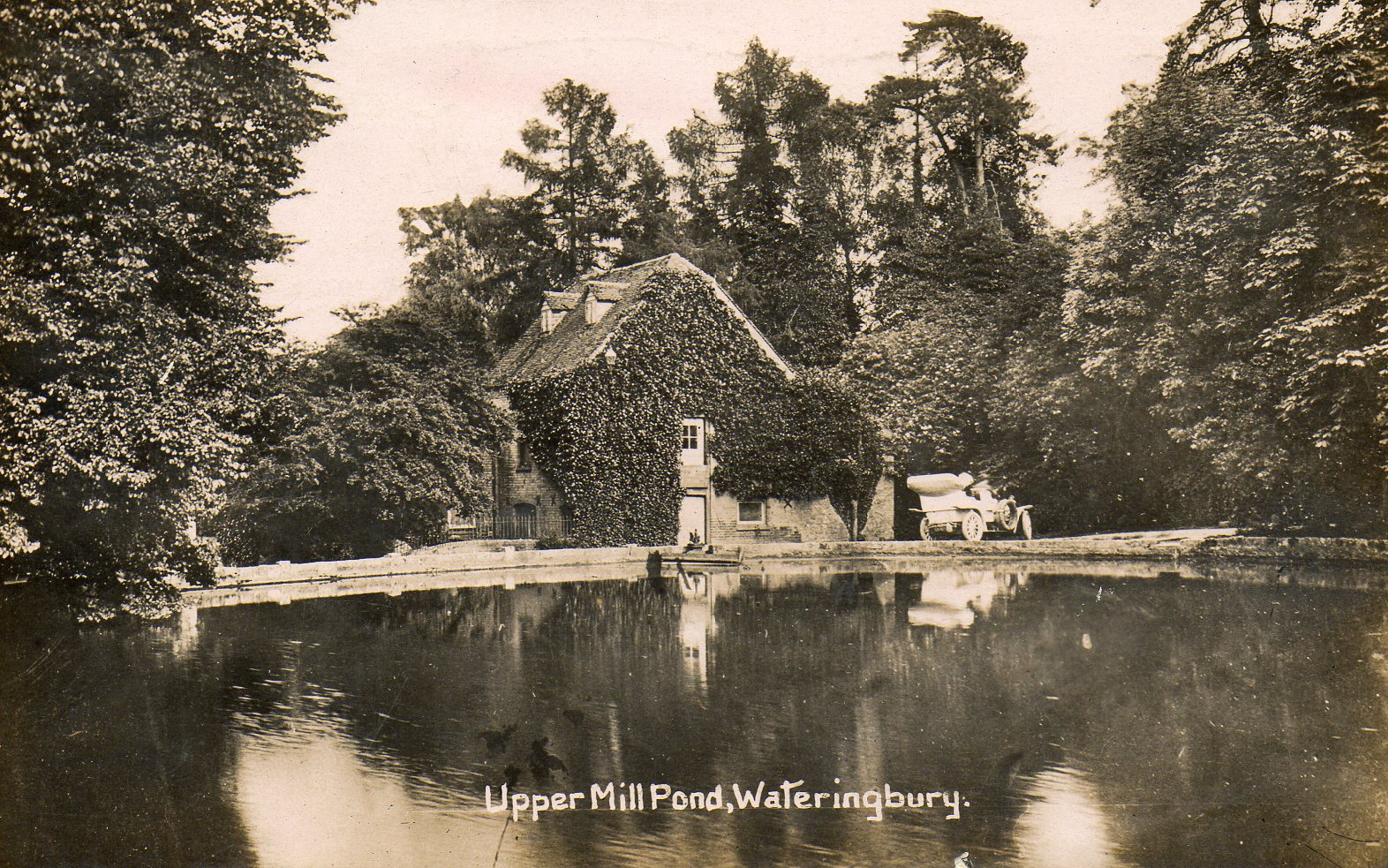
Brattle mill c.1910

Brattle Mill was a corn mill. It was named after a miller, Robert Brattle. It was first mentioned in 1783 and was owned by Robert Brattle. In 1838 the mill was owned by Harry Blaker and occupied by William Mills. Harry Blaker died c.1848 and the mill was run for a short time by his widow, Sarah. James Fremlin took over the lease of the mill by 1851, also running Warden Mill. He purchased the mill from Sarah Blaker c.1868. The miller at this time being Alfred Bloorman. The original overshot waterwheel was of wood. It was replaced by a turbine c.1910 and it was about this time the mill was last used for milling, then being used to generate electricity. Brattle Mill was sometimes known as Upper Mill. A 15 feet 6 inches (4.72 m) diameter by 6 feet (1.83 m) wide cast iron overshot waterwheel from Lower Mill, Polegate, Sussex, was reconstructed at the mill in the early 1980s and the owner intended to reconstruct the machinery to return the building to a working mill. The mill originally worked three pairs of millstones.^{C}

=== Warden Mill, Wateringbury. ===
TQ 690 532 51°15′10″N 0°25′22″E

Warden Mill was a corn mill that took its name from the farm to which it belonged, Warden Farm. The first reference to this mill was in November 1822, when John Savage of Cobham leased the mill from John Selby of Marden and John Fellow of Eynsford. In October 1829 James Fremlin took over the lease. Selby and Fellow(s) held the freehold of the mill until October 1838. In 1839 the area of the mill pond was given as ¾ acre. Charles Whittaker was the owner of the mill in 1842 and by April 1845 Whittaker and Fremlin were joint owners, but by November 1847 the mill had passed back to John Selby. James Fremlin purchased a moiety of the property in October 1871. He purchased the other share in the property in December 1876. Richard Clemetson took over the mill between 1878 and 1887, followed by William James Hawes sometime between 1890 and 1895. The mill last worked in 1913 and was demolished c.1914. The head of water was some 8 feet (2.44 m). It is thought that this mill had a breast shot waterwheel.^{B}^{,} ^{C}

== West Farleigh stream ==
A stream rises at West Farleigh, and flows into the Medway from the right above Teston Lock. It powered a watermill.

=== Tutsham Oil Mill, West Farleigh ===
TQ 709 531 51°15′05″N 0°27′00″E

Possibly a Domesday site, latterly the mill was an oil mill, burnt down on 17 April 1885. it was powered by a turbine. Only the front wall of the mill remains.

== Loose Stream ==
The Loose Stream or River Loose enters the Medway from the right at Tovil. Lambarde mentions thirteen fulling mills and one corn mill. Camden gives thirteen fulling mills. By c.1715 the Kentish cloth trade has declined, and Harris only mentions two fulling mills and one paper mill. Owing to the purity of the stream, paper making rose in importance in the nineteenth century.^{A}

=== Brishing Court mill, Boughton Monchelsea ===
TQ 779 515 51°14′07″N 0°32′51″E

The ancient manor of Brishing Court may have been the site of a mill. There is little evidence supporting the claim to a mill, which would have been demolished by the mid-Eighteenth century if it existed.

=== Leg-o-Mutton (Wilson's) mill, Loose ===
TQ 762 521 51°14′27″N 0°31′31″E

This mill took its name from the shape of the mill pond. It was in the ownership of the Wilson family in the 1870s. In its later life the mill was converted into three cottages, now demolished. The head of water being some 12 feet (3.66 m) to 15 feet (4.57 m) indicates an overshot waterwheel.^{B}

=== Old (Gurney's) Mill ===
TQ 760 521 51°14′27″N 0°31′21″E

Only the foundations of this paper mill remain, by Salts Lane. The mill was demolished after the First World War. It had an overshot waterwheel of 15 feet (4.57 m) diameter and 9 feet (2.74 m) wide.^{A}^{,} ^{B}

=== Loose village watermill ===
TQ 758 522 51°14′30″N 0°31′11″E

This was a corn mill, probably the one mentioned by Lambarde. It had an overshot waterwheel driving three pairs of millstones, and was working until the First World War but subsequently demolished.^{A}

=== Little Ivy Mill ===
This mill was attached to the manor of Pymps Court in the sixteenth century. It was then a fulling mill. Later it was a paper mill and latterly a corn mill with was converted into a house in 1912, the waterwheel and machinery being scrapped.^{A}

=== Great Ivy Mill ===
This was a fulling mill, later a paper mill. The overshot waterwheel was replaced by a turbine but the pentrough remained. Papermaking had ceased before the First World War.

=== Bockingford Mill ===
TQ 75681 53644 51°15′18″N 0°30′58″E

This was once a washing (fulling) mill, converted to corn milling by the mid-nineteenth century. The present building dates from c. 1880 and last worked c. 1892, Mrs Marsham, the owner gave notice to the miller that she wished to terminate his tenancy in April 1891. The mill was extended and converted into a house shortly after. The last miller was a Mr. Wilson, with Tom Bates preceding him. A Mr. Rose, foreman at Little Ivy Mill was one of the first inhabitants of the converted mill. The mill pond was some 300 feet (91 m) long and 70 feet (21 m) wide, giving an area of 2,333 square yards (1,951 m^{2}). The frame of the cast iron waterwheel, some 12 feet (3.66 m) diameter and 8 feet (2.44 m) wide remains under the building.^{A}^{,} ^{B}

=== Hayle Mill, Tovil ===
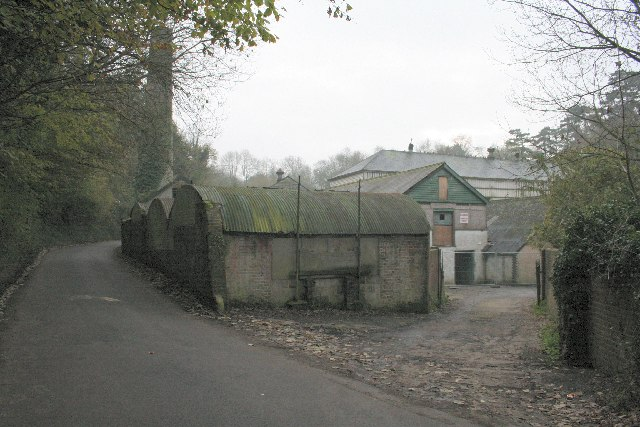
Hayle Mill from Straw Hill

TQ 756 53851°15′22″N 0°31′03″E

This has been the site of a mill for many centuries. The last mill was a paper mill, built in 1808 and was noted for its handmade paper. The mill was bought by John Green in 1817 and remained in the green family until the mill closed in 1987. In 1905, Herbert Green raised objections to the building of the Headcorn and Maidstone Junction Light Railway, the extension of the Kent and East Sussex Railway, a short portion of which was built as far as Tovil. His main objection was that the smoke from the locomotives would interfere with the operation of his mill. The eventual granting of the light railway order involved a tunnel which was considerably longer than that which was originally proposed, a fact which pleased Mr. Green, who prophesied that "the longer the tunnel the less chance the line would be built."

The mill house burnt down on 20 June 2003, but the mill survived. The House was rebuilt in 2006–07 as part of the conversion of the Mill to apartments. The waterwheel is 12 feet (3.66 m) diameter and 9 feet 9 inches (2.97 m) wide, being an unusual combination of pitchback and high breast shot, having the ability to apply water to the wheel in two different positions. The waterwheel bears the legend 'F. Clark, Millwright, Ashford 1875'.^{A}^{,} ^{B}

=== Upper Crisbrook Mill. ===
TQ 756 541 51°15′32″N 0°30′55″E

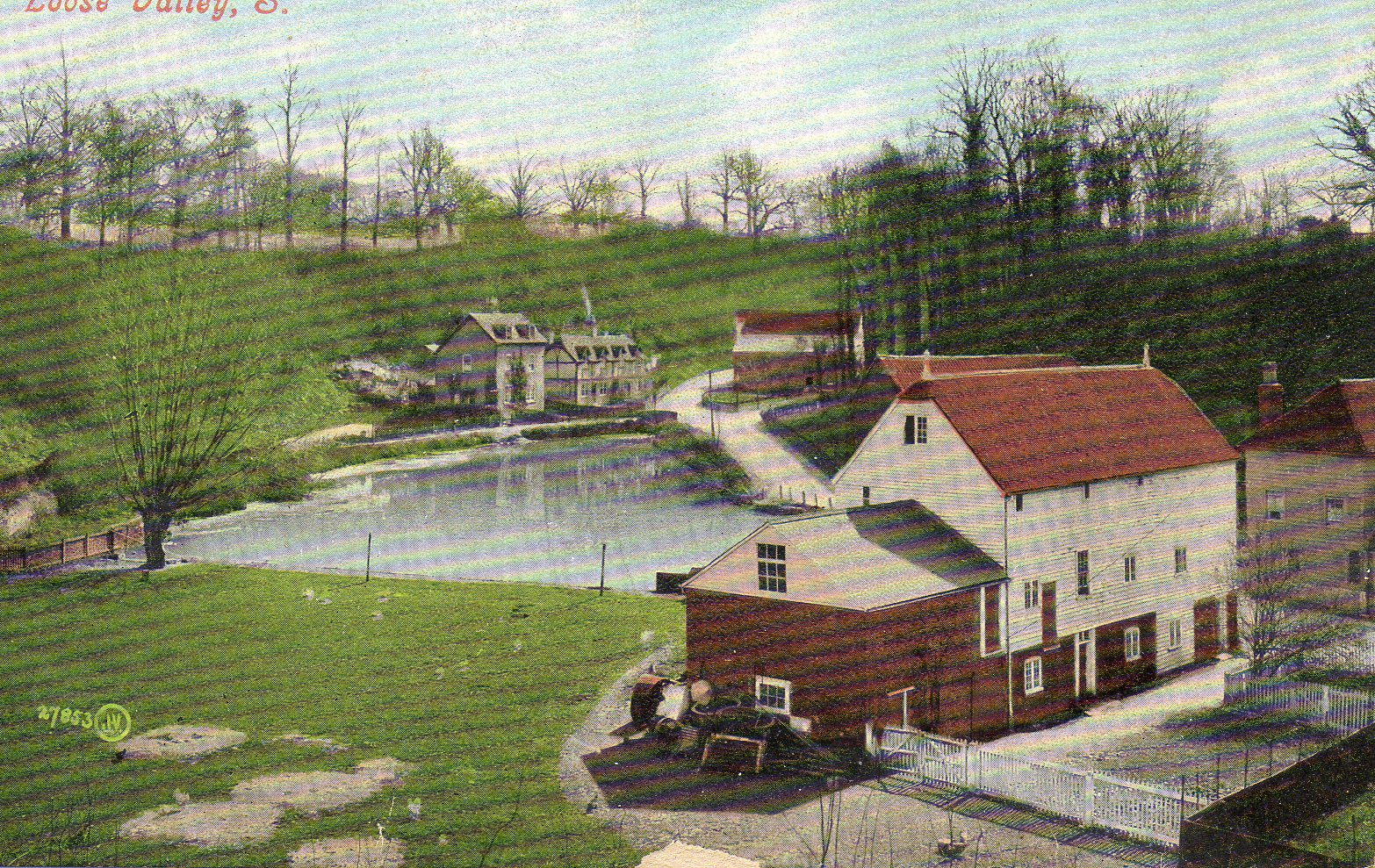
Upper and Lower Crisbrook Mills.

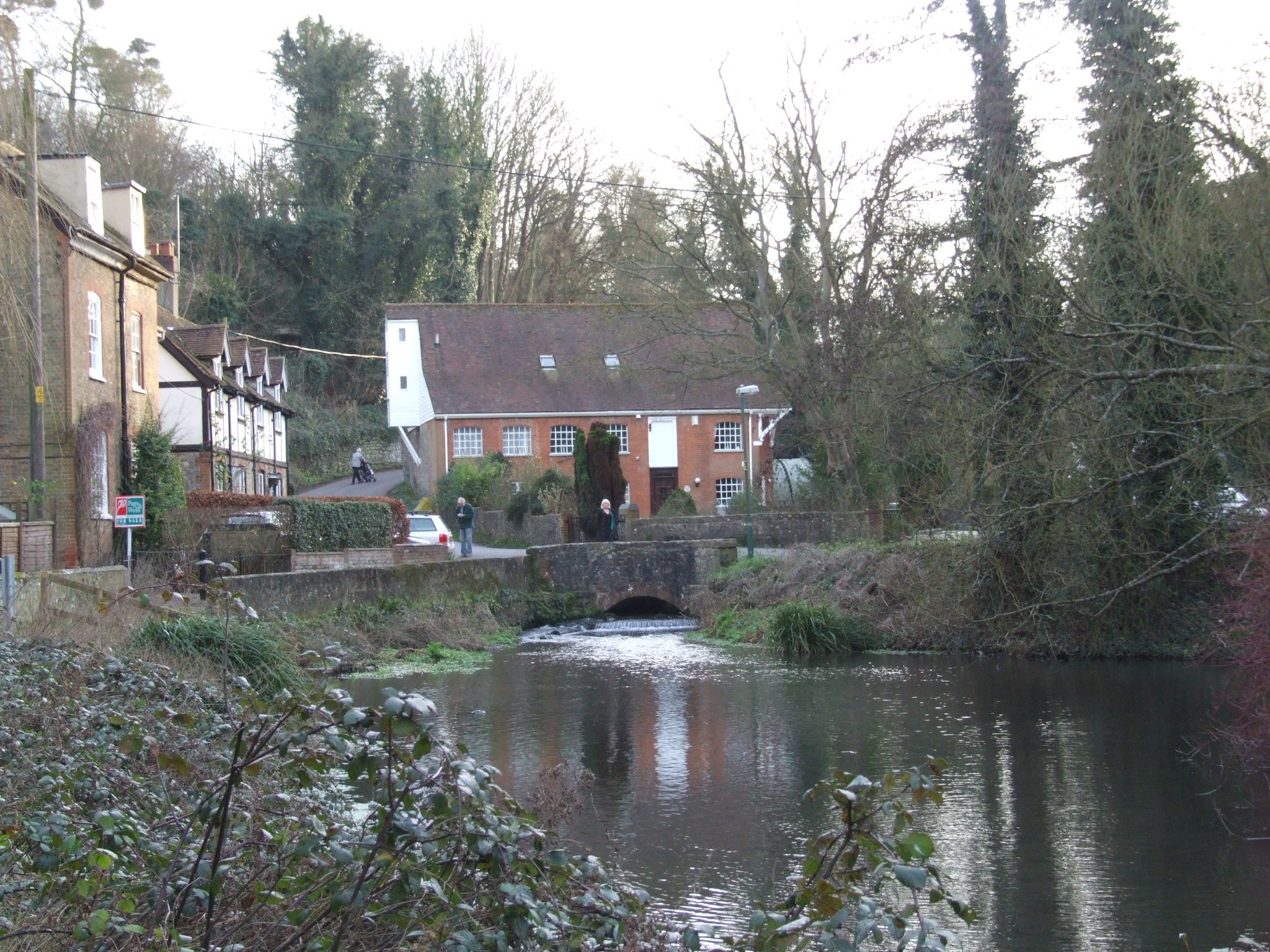
Upper Chrisbrook Mill, converted to residential, showing overshot wheel

The seventeenth century structure latterly had a cast iron overshot waterwheel driving pumping machinery, working until the 1960s. The derelict waterwheel survived in the early 1970s and has now been restored, the mill buildings being house converted c.1975. Both the Crisbrook mills were the property of the dean and chapter of Canterbury. The ancient spelling of these mills was 'Christbrook/Chrisbrook'.^{A}^{,} ^{B}

=== Lower Crisbrook Mill. ===
TQ 756 542 51°15′36″N 0°30′55″E

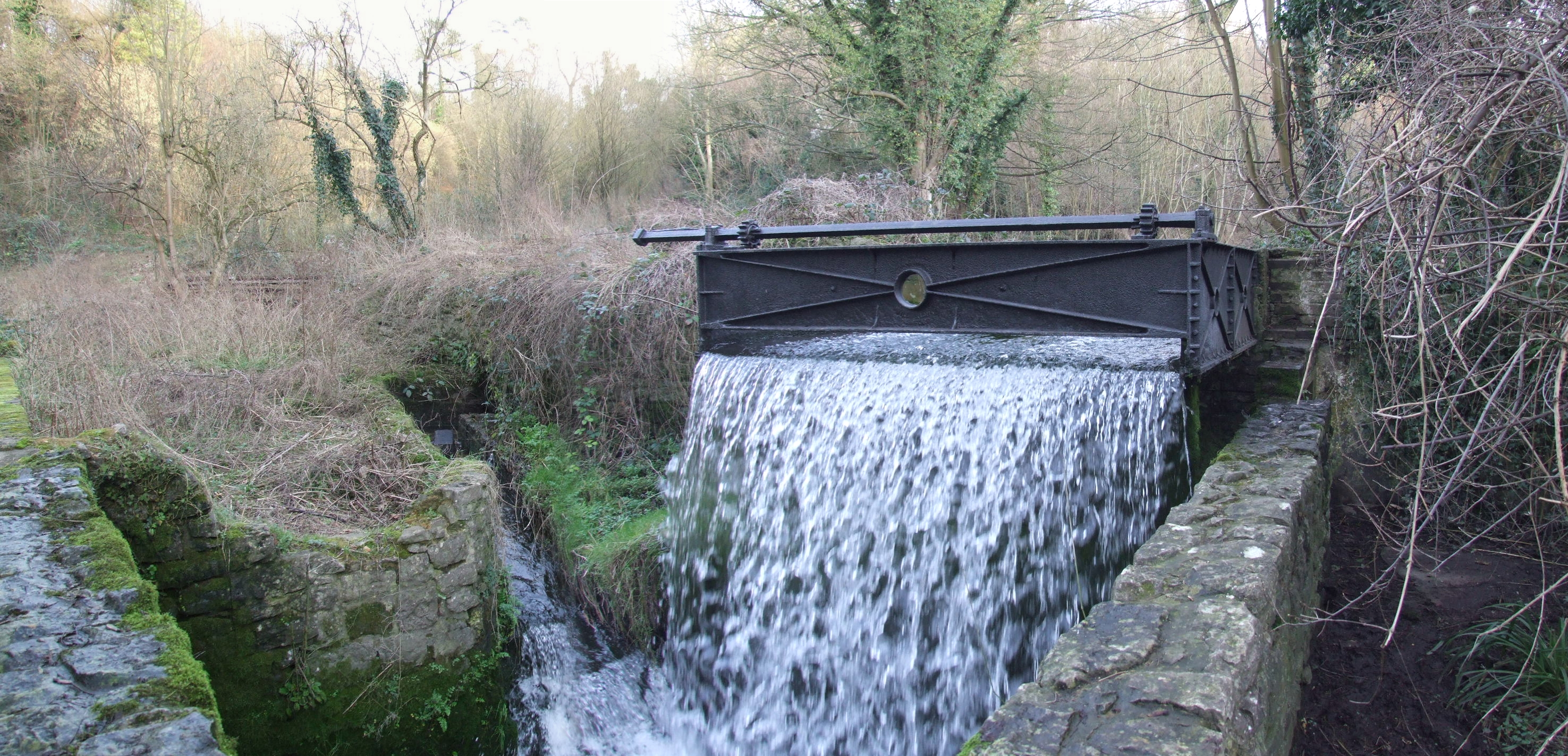
Wheel pit, Lower Chrisbrook Mill

This late eighteenth-century mill housed an internal water wheel; it was a corn mill c.1719. It had an overshot waterwheel driving four pairs of millstones. The mill last worked in 1905 and the machinery scrapped some thirty years later. An earlier mill on this site was probably the mill leased by the prior of Canterbury to Robert De Hucham. Only parts of the walls remain today.^{A}

=== Upper Tovil Mill. ===
TQ 7545 5445 51°15′44″N 0°30′48″E

This was a fulling mill, later a paper mill. The mill had an overshot waterwheel but was burnt down in 1894. The rebuilt mill was powered by steam. The site of the mill was cleared in the 1980s to make way for a housing development. One of the Tovil mills belonged to Maidstone College in 1525.

=== Lower Tovil Mill (Allnut Mill). ===
TQ 7520 5475 51°15′54″N 0°30′35″E

This was a fulling mill, later a paper mill. The large overshot waterwheel was scrapped in 1941 but papermaking continued after the war. The buildings have all been demolished and developed for housing.^{B}

=== Bridge Mill. ===
TQ 750 547 51°15′53″N 0°30′25″E

Originally a fulling mill, then a corn mill. A powder mill was established here in the eighteenth century and later an oil mill. Bridge mill was latterly a paper mill, ceasing work in the late twentieth century. The site has been cleared for a housing development.^{A}

== Loose Stream tributary ==
=== Upper Mill, Loose. ===
Originally a fulling mill, then a paper mill, latterly a corn mill with an overshot waterwheel driving three pairs of stones. This mill was in the ownership of the Wilson family in the 1870s. It closed in 1908 and has since been demolished.^{A}

== River Len ==
The River Len enters the Medway from the Right at Maidstone. It powered a number of watermills, from source to mouth they were:-

=== Polhill (Holme) Mill, Harrietsham. ===
TQ 861 523 51°14′22″N 0°40′01″E

A Domesday site, Holme Mill is recorded as Holemiln in 1254 and Holemille in 1332. In 1542 the manor of Polhill was in the ownership of John Stede. The mill passed to his son Thomas and then to his son Matthew. The mill was owned by Francis Colepeper Esq at the time of his death in 1590. It was worth 40s per annum then. In 1668 the mill was held by John Ruffen. It was the a fulling mill. Peter Theobalds was the tenant at the time of his death in 1690. About this time the mill was converted to a corn mill. Stephen Weeks was the miller from 1700–1726, followed by his son John. He was followed by his son Thomas. Thomas Knight leased the mill for 21 years from 1779. He was followed by George Cronk and then John Brazier and Thomas Martin, who was the miller in 1824. In 1847 John Bunger was the miller, followed by William and Thomas Taylor in 1855. In 1895, the mill was in the occupation of Miller Bros, followed by Mrs Rhoda Vinson from 1907 - 1913. The mill had collapsed by the time Coles Finch visited it and was demolished in 1929, although the waterwheel and pentrough by Weeks of Maidstone survive.^{D}

=== Chegworth Mill, Ulcombe. ===
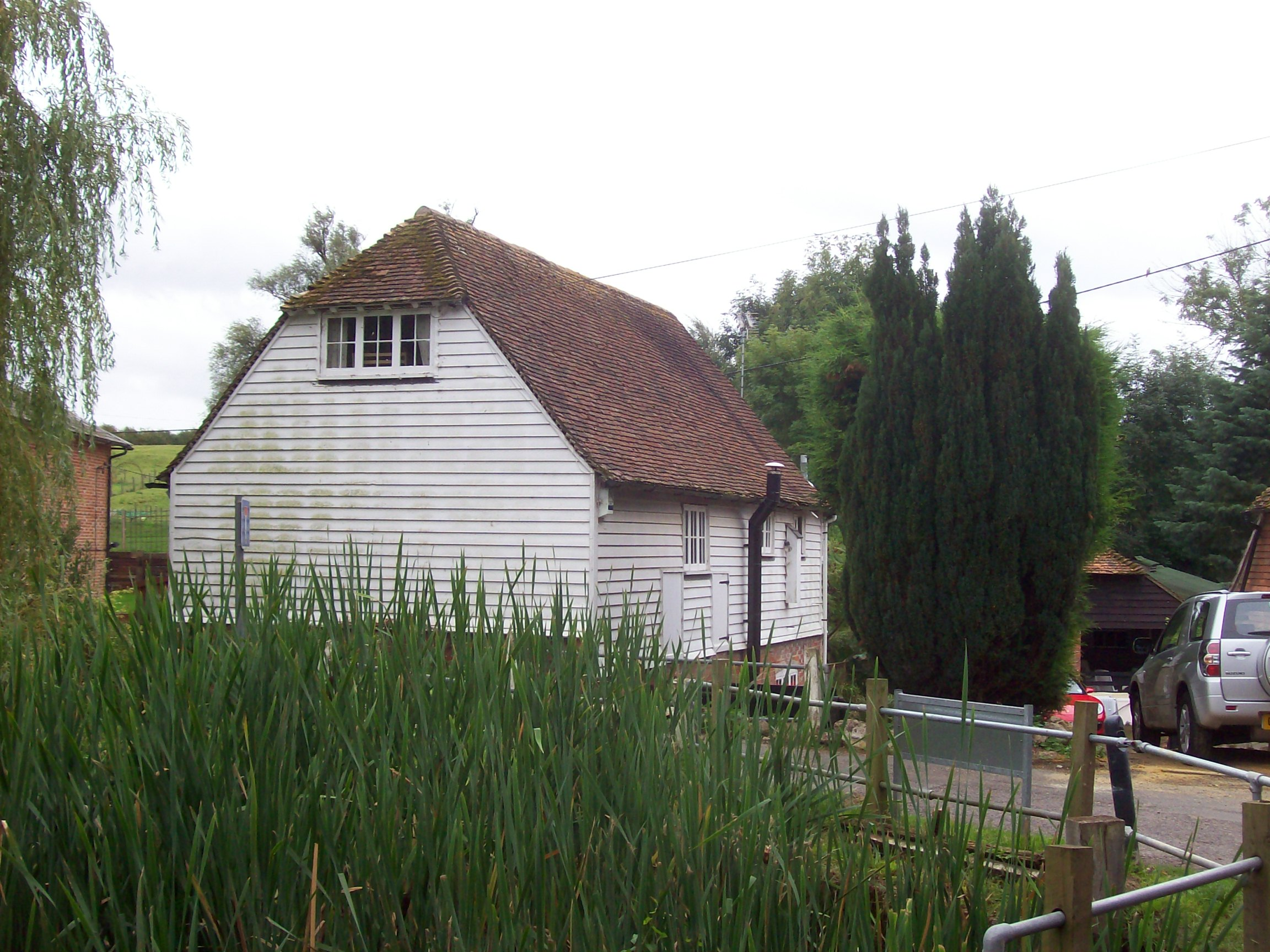
Chegworth Mill

TQ 849 527 51°14′36″N 0°39′00″E

Chegworth mill is probably not the Domesday mill recorded at Ulcombe. The first reference to Chegworth occurs in 1200. The first definite reference to this mill was in 1317, when the mill was held by John de Cheggeworth. John de Chageworth was recorded at the mill in 1324. The mill was in the ownership of Sir Cheney Culpeper in 1657. It was then known as the Lower Mill. The previous owners were Thomas Hatche and Richard Austen, who had recently sold the mill at that date. John Pecke was the miller. Seventeenth century millers in Ulcombe include Willia Pettit (1612), Percival Austen (1669), Thomas Sylliborne (1673) and John Baker (1682). It is not known which mill each was at, there being two watermills and a windmill in Ulcombe during this period. William Taylor was the miller in the mid-nineteenth century. In 1702, John Feverstone was the miller. The mill was known as Pendmill in 1745 when the miller was recorded as John Feverstour the Elder. John Feverstone the older was the miller in 1766, when the lease was renewed. Richard Tilbe being the owner at this time. Thomas Willett leased the mill in 1792 and in 1800 Chegworth Mill, otherwise Pendmill was mortgaged by Willett. The mill was recorded as Checqworth Mill on the 1801 Ordnance Survey map. John Taylor was the miller in 1847, followed by G Craddock in 1852, J Gilbert, William and Thomas Taylor in 1854, Mrs M Cradduck, J Gilbert and Thomas Taylor 1855 - 1861, Charles Wicks in 1874, Alfred Wick 1895 - 1907, Frederick James Potter 1930 - 1934. The last miller was Ted Uren, who started at the mill in 1961, and took over from Harold Potter. The mill was house converted c.1990. The present mill was a corn mill and worked until the late 1960s. It has an overshot waterwheel of 10 feet 10 inches (3.30 m) diameter and 7 feet 6 inches (2.29 m) wide, made by Weeks of Maidstone. The axle is cast iron and 7 1/2 inches (190 mm) square. The pit wheel is cast iron with 96 lignum vitae cogs. The cast iron upright shaft carries a cast iron wallower with 38 teeth and a cast iron Great Spur Wheel with 104 cogs. It powered three pairs of millstones. One pair are French Burr stones (by Hughes & Son of Dover and London) of 44 inches (1.12 m) diameter, one pair are Peak stones of 46 inches (1.17 m) diameter and the third pair have a Peak runner stone on a French Burr bedstone, both 42 inches (1.07 m) diameter. The Crown Wheel drove two layshafts, which powered various machines including a "Ureka" winnower and an oat crusher by Ganz & Co., of Budapest, Hungary. A saw bench outside the mill was also driven by belts & pulleys. The sack hoist is driven from the top of the upright shaft.^{B}

=== The Mille, Broomfield ===
TQ 834 536 51°15′07″N 0°37′37″E

Possibly a Domesday site, the mill was marked on a map dated 1649. A 1748 map shows the watercourses but no mill. The head of water available was some 10 feet (3.05 m), indicating a breast shot or overshot waterwheel.

=== Le Mille, Broomfield ===
TQ 834 532 51°14′53″N 0°37′34″E

The first mention of this mill was in 1368 when a fulling mill had been erected by Thomas Burgeys of Smarden. In 1486 the mill was held by Thomas Bourghchier the Younger. The mill was marked on a map of Leeds Castle dated 1649. In 1748, the waterways and mill pond were marked on a map, but no building. The mill seems to have ceased work sometime after the 1660s, when John Rogers was recorded as a fuller in Leeds. The mill may have had a breast shot or overshot waterwheel.

=== Leeds Castle Mill, Broomfield. ===
TQ 835 532 51°14′54″N 0°37′49″E

A mill was recorded at Broomfield in the Domesday book. This predated the building of a mill by either Robert de Crevecoeur or his son Hamo de Crevecoeur in 1100. Originally built as a corn mill, there is some evidence that it had been converted to a fulling mill by 1368. This being the work of Thomas Burgeys of Smarden. The surviving mill building dates from the early thirteenth century and fell out of use in the middle seventeenth century. The building was some 16 feet (4.88 m) wide, 42 feet (12.80 m) long and 35 feet (10.67 m) high. The waterwheel was driven from the lake to the castle. The mill was located between the Outer Barbican and Inner Barbican and the breast shot waterwheel would have been some 10 feet (3.05 m) or 11 feet (3.35 m) diameter and 3 feet (0.91 m) wide. The remains of a pair of Peak millstones were recorded as lying in the wheel pit in 1967. The stones seemed to be of early nineteenth-century manufacture and it is not known whether they came from this mill of one of the other mills owned by the Leeds Castle estate.^{B}

=== Keepers Cottage mill, Broomfield ===
TQ 831 536 51°15′07″N 0°37′19″E

A possible mill site, a building was marked on a map of Leeds Castle dated 1748 on the island which lies above Keeper's Cottage. The site is probably not a Domesday site and if a mill existed here it disappeared in the late Middle Ages.

=== Old (Boxley, Hollingbourne, Hurst, Mote Hole) Mill, Leeds. ===
TQ 820 541 51°15′25″N 0°36′33″E

This mill stood on the parish boundary of Hollingbourne and Leeds. In 1654 the mill was recorded as a fulling mill in the occupation of John and William Dann. A William Dann, fuller, of Leeds is recorded as having been a bondsman at a wedding in 1640. The fulling mill had gone by 1723. In 1733, Sir Roger Meredith, Baronet, of Leeds Abbey leased land in Hollingbourne to James Whatman with permission to erect a new dwelling house and papermill. Whatman sub-leased part of the land to Richard Harris from 1733–1736, then William Quelch and John Terry from 1739–1741 and John Saunders from 1741 - 1748. He was followed by Henry French from 1749 - 1770. James Whatman Jr inherited the freehold in 1759 and occupied the mill until 1775. He was followed by Clement Taylor as occupier from 1776–1791 and by 1794 a Mr Calcraft had acquired the freehold. In 1795, Messrs Balston, Finch, Hollingworth & Co were owner occupiers. In 1824, Messrs Hollingworth, Finch and Thomas were the occupiers. In 1843, John Hollingworth, papermaker, was the occupier. The mill was still a paper mill in 1847 but had been converted to a corn mill by 1852, when the miller was one of R Dawson, E Nye of H Nye (the other two millers being at Eyhorne and Manor mills, Hollingbourne). In 1854, Richard Ashbe and John Bunyar were millers at Mote Hole Mill. William Skinner was the miller in 1855. William Taylor was the miller at Old Mill in 1874. George Stephen Kingsnorth was miller at Mote Hole Mill in 1895, followed by the Medway Milling Co in 1907. In 1908, the mill was being used to grind cocoa beans. Edward Weller was the miller in 1913. The mill had probably ceased work by 1922 and was idle by 1928. The mill gearing had been jammed by a baulk of timber, jamming the machinery by that date. Old Mill was five storeys high. It had an overshot waterwheel of at least 12 feet (3.66 m) diameter and 7 feet (2.13 m) width. It drove six pairs of millstones by lineshaft. The machinery was removed during World War II and the mill demolished c. 1955.^{B}^{,} ^{D}

=== Brandescombe (Buscombe, Fulling) Mill, Leeds ===
TQ 812 540 51°15′22″N 0°35′42″E

This mill was presented to the Priory of Leeds by Robert de Crevecoeur the Younger. The mill was also mentioned in the will of Daniel de Crevequer, who died in 1177. At that time it was a corn mill. Leeds priory was dissolved in 1539 and the mill was still in the ownership of the priory then. In 1628, Thomas Fludd and Ralphe Buffkin sold the mill to William Cage of Lincoln's Inn, Middlesex. By this time it was a fulling mill. Cage was still the owner in 1689, when the mill was in the occupation of William Tompkin and had previously been in the occupation of Bob Potter. Potter remained in occupation until at least 1707. Hasted noted the mill was still working in 1798 and Greenwood's map of 1822 marks the mill as Shilling Mill. The mill probably had a breast-shot waterwheel as the head was not sufficient for an overshot wheel. Fulling Mill had ceased to be used as a mill by 1843, there being no entry in Bagshaw's Directory of that year. The surviving building is of the fifteenth century.

=== Thurnham (Ballard's) Mill ===
This was a Domesday mill, and stood some 200 yards (180 m) upstream of the present mill, on the south side of Milgate Park. In 1624 the mill was occupied by Edward Chambers. In 1635 the mill, late in the occupation of Matthew Chambers, being two corn mills and a fulling mill, were conveyed to William Cage. In 1685 Celia Cage, widow of Matthew, held the mills. Fulling having apparently been discontinued by this time. William Barber was the miller in the mid-eighteenth century, and Richard Ballard took the mill in 1777. Ballard was still in occupation in 1815, when the mill was marked as Ballard's Mill on a map of the new turnpike from Maidstone to Bearsted. The millpond was some 400 feet (120 m) long and the dam about 7 feet (2.13 m) high, indicating that the waterwheel was breastshot. Ballard's mill was demolished c.1828 and a new mill built downstream. A turbine was installed at the old mill site, and its remains were visible in the late 1960s.

=== Thurnham Mill. ===
TQ 802 54751°15′46″N 0°35′02″E

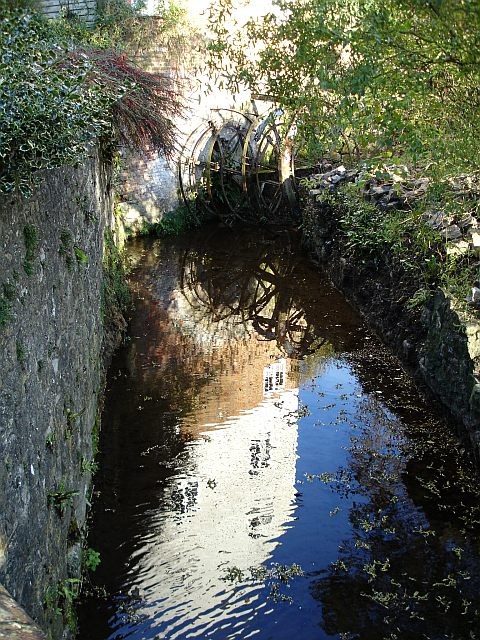
Thurnham Mill reflected in the water.

This mill was built by the Cage family in the late 1820s on a piece of land called Byfrance, part of the Milgate estate. The tail race from Ballard's Mill was extended some 200 yards (180 m) to get sufficient height to drive an overshot waterwheel of 9 feet (2.74 m) diameter and 10 feet (3.05 m) wide. The waterwheel was carried on a cast iron axle and drove a 7 feet (2.13 m) diameter cast iron pit wheel with wooden cogs. That drove the wallower on the upright shaft, then a 6 feet (1.83 m) diameter cast iron great spur wheel drove four pairs of millstones. There were two pairs of French burr stones and two pairs of Peak stones. One pair of each type was 4 feet (1.22 m) diameter and the other pair of each type was 3 feet 6 inches (1.07 m) diameter. At the top of the upright shaft was a 5 feet (1.52 m) diameter cast iron crown wheel. The Blinkhorn family had a long association as millers at the mill, John Blinkhorn being the miller in 1825. J Blinkhorn was the miller in 1852 and John Blinkhorn in 1874. A new waterwheel was fitted after World War I. Marshall Bros were the millers 1930 - 1934. The mill was working until World War II when the axle to the waterwheel broke. Most of the machinery was then scrapped. The mill was sold for house conversion in 1986, at that time only the frame of the waterwheel and pit wheel survived, all other machinery having been removed.

=== Otham Mill. ===
Also known as Bearsted Mill, this corn mill was built in 1837. It was still standing in 1939 and the overshot waterwheel had a width that exceeded its diameter.

=== Otham Paper Mill ===
Originally built as a fulling mill in 1527. The machinery was to be made by Cranbrook millwright George Jenkyn. The mill was to have two overshot waterwheels 7 feet 6 inches (2.29 m) diameter. The contract was signed on 8 January 1527, with the mill to be completed by May Day. Total cost of the mill was £88 5s 3d. The mill had been converted to a paper mill by 1700. By the 1830s Otham Paper Mill was occupied by the papermakers at Turkey Mill. A paper making machine was installed, but removed to Turkey Mill in 1859, when the mill was converted to house a two engine washer for cleaning and beating rags for use in the papermaking process. The mill was marked on the first 6" Ordnance Survey map.

=== Poll (Pole, Mote) Mill, Boxley ===
TQ 774 553 51°16′09″N 0°32′39″E

Originally built as a fulling mill in 1527. The machinery was to be made by Cranbrook millwright George Jenkyn. The mill was to have two overshot waterwheels 7 feet 6 inches (2.29 m) diameter. The contract was signed on 8 January, with the mill to be completed by May Day. Total cost of the mill was £88 5s 3d. The mill had been converted to a paper mill by 1700. By the 1830s Otham Paper Mill was occupied by the papermakers at Turkey Mill. A paper making machine was installed, but removed to Turkey Mill in 1859, when the mill was converted to house a two engine washer for cleaning and beating rags for use in the papermaking process. The mill was marked on the first 6" Ordnance Survey map.^{B}

=== Turkey Mill, Boxley. ===
TQ 772 556 51°16′19″N 0°32′29″E

This mill was originally a fulling mill and is known to have been used as such between 1640 and 1671. It was at various times known as Overloppe Mill (1640,) and Gill's Mill (1732). Overloppe Mill was sold for £493 by Simon Smythe of Tenterden to John Fletcher of Boxley in 1640. The mill passed to Richard Fletcher in 1657 and then to John Cripps by 1693. Thomas Tolhurst was the fuller from 1640 - 1675. The mill was converted from a fulling mill to a paper mill during the time John Cripps owned it. The mill passed to Dorothy Cripps in 1695. She granted a 41-year lease to George Gill. The lease passed to his son William, who acquired the freehold of the mill from John and Christopher Cripps, the sons of John Cripps. Gill was declared bankrupt in 1731 and the mill passed to James Brooke, the chief mortgagee. Richard Harris was the tenant in 1736, acquiring the freehold in 1738. Harris demolished the old mill buildings and erected a new mill, but died in November 1739 before the work was completed. The name Turkey Mill was first recorded in 1739. The mill passed to Ann Cripps, who married James Whatman in 1740. thus James Whatman acquired the mill, and it was here that he developed 'wove' paper. At this time Turkey Mill was the largest paper mill in the country. The mill was sold by James Whatman Jr in 1792 to Thomas, Robert and Finch Hollingworth of Maidstone for the substantial sum of £32,000. The Hollingworths were originally in partnership with William Balston, but he withdrew from the partnership in 1805 and set up a new paper mill at Springfield, Maidstone. Ownership of the mill passed from Thomas Hollingworth through his sons and thence through their nieces until eventually Major William Pitt was the sole owner. On his death in 1976 Turkey Mills were bought by Wiggins Teape and closed down, thus ending over 280 years of continuous paper production at the mill. The longest by any paper mill in Great Britain.

Watermarks.

The copyright of the 'J Whatman' was transferred to William Balston in 1806 and production of Whatman paper at Turkey Mill. In 1859 the 'Turkey Mill' watermark was sold to William Balston's two sons at Springfield Mill, and thereafter paper produced at Turkey Mill was watermarked 'Original Turkey Mill', 'O.T.M.' or 'T & J Hollingworth'.

Uses of paper produced at Turkey Mill.

The artist Thomas Gainsborough used paper produced at the mill for his drawings. He wrote in 1797 that it was worth 'a guinea a quire'. J. M. W. Turner also used Whatman Paper and William Blake used it for four of his illustrated books. Napoleon wrote his will on Whatman Paper and Queen Victoria used it for her personal correspondence. In the 1930s Soviet leaders used Whatman Paper to publish their five-year plan for the future of the USSR and at the end of World War Two the peace treaty with Japan was written on Whatman Paper.^{A}

=== Christian's Mill, Maidstone ===
This was a fulling mill. William Pertis was the miller in 1716, having been preceded by George Overy. Pertis sold the mill to William Gill in 1719. The mill had been demolished by 1735 and replaced by six houses known as "The Square". A now demolished cottage nearby was called Fulling Mill House and bore the date 1567.^{A}^{,} ^{B}

=== Padsole (Lenworth) Mill, Maidstone. ===
TQ 764 556 51°16′20″N 0°31′48″E

Possibly a Domesday site, this mill stood in Water Lane. A dispute over the building of a mill here reached the King's Court in 1313-4. The mill was one of two in Maidstone owned by Christ Church, Canterbury. A 21-year lease was granted by Archbishop Courtenay in 1385 to William Walbelton and Richard Haute. The mill was known as Poll Mill in 1449 (a fulling mill). In 1510 the miller was one of 22 tenants of the Archbishop of Canterbury who considered his rent was excessive and refused to pay. In 1548 it consisted of two wheat mills, two fulling mills, a malt-mill and two potchers. It was known as Paddes Fulling Mill in 1550 and Paddle le Myll in 1608. In 1650, Padsole mill was owned by Sir William Culpeper. The mill was derelict by the end of the eighteenth century and subsequently demolished. The mill was rebuilt by James Smythe in 1795 as a paper mill. Smythe was in partnership with the Hollingworth brothers. They acquired the mill and sold it to John Wise and John Hayes in 1799. The mill was marked on Brown & Son's survey of Maidstone, 1821. The mill was demolished in 1874 and a new corn mill built nearby by William Taylor of Chegworth Mill. The last mill building was a three-storey brick structure. Messrs Bradley, Taylor and Youngman were the millers in 1957, but the mill had ceased to work by water power by then. The building survived until the 1980s.^{A}

=== Church Mill, Maidstone. ===
TQ 759 555 51°16′17″N 0°31′22″E

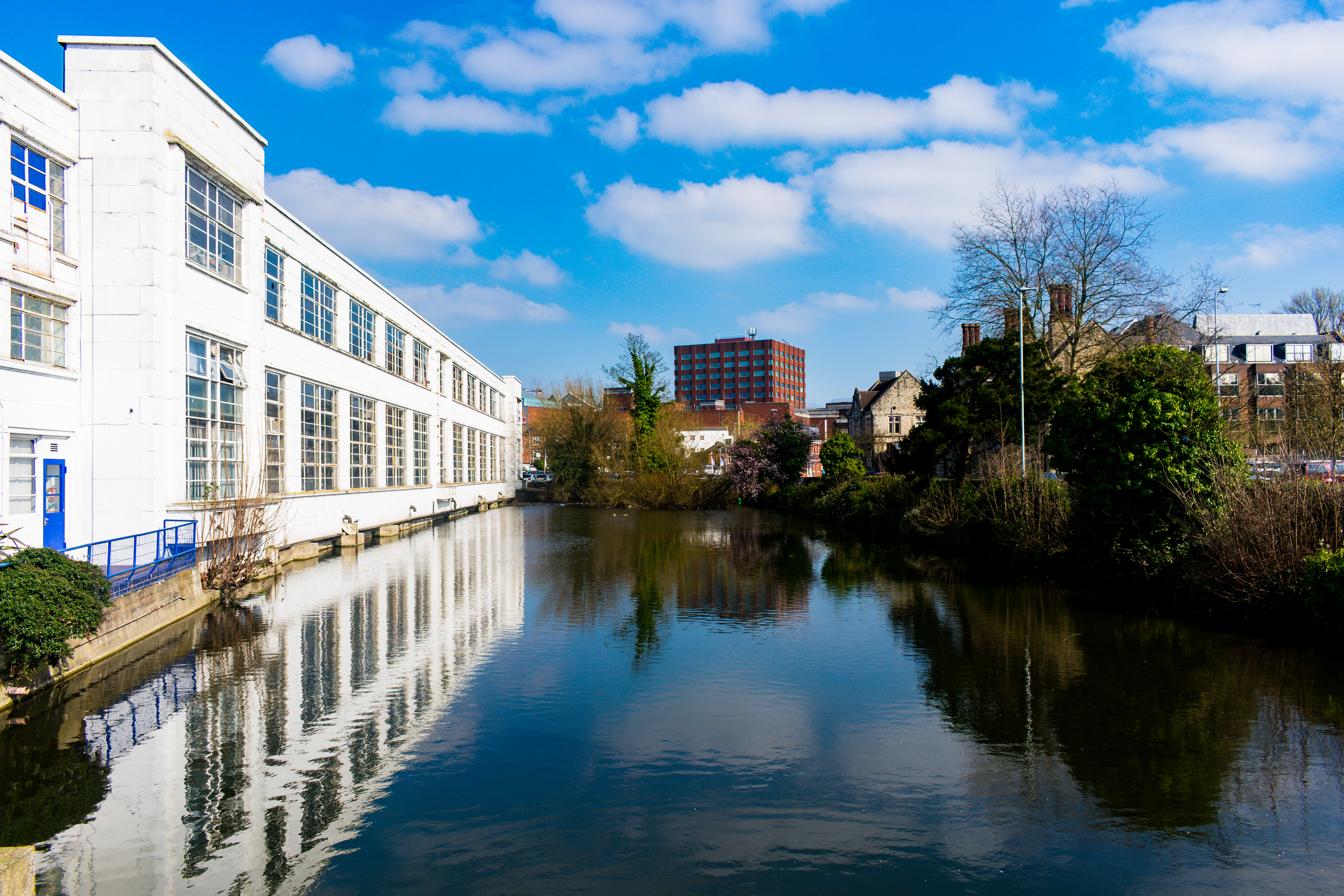
The mill pond

Church mill was one of the two mills in Maidstone owned by Christ Church, Canterbury. It may be one of the five Domesday mills recorded in Maidstone. Church mill was standing in 1572. William Purtis/Purlis was the miller in 1752, renewing his lease on the mill in that year. An inventory at the time showed that Church mill had two pairs of French Burr millstones and one pair of Peak millstones. It was marked on Brown & Son's survey of Maidstone, 1821. The mill was demolished in 1903 as part of a road widening scheme. The millpond survives.^{A}^{,} ^{B}

=== Little Church Mill, Maidstone. ===
TQ 760 555 51°16′17″N 0°31′27″E

This mill stood on the watercourse that was the bypass from Church Mill. William Purtis/Purlis was the miller in 1752, renewing his lease on the mill in that year. An inventory at the time showed that Little Church mill had one pair of French Burr millstones and four bolting mills. It was marked on Brown & Son's survey of Maidstone, 1821. The mill demolished in the early nineteenth century.^{A}^{,} ^{B}

== Selesbourne (Len tributary). ==
=== Mill at Harrietsham ===
This was a grinding (corn) mill.

== The Fair Bourne (Len tributary). ==
=== Fairbourne Mill, Harrietsham ===
TQ 866 517 51°14′02″N 0°40′26″E

This mill was probably a Domesday mill. The first definite reference to this mill was in 1580, when the rent was assessed at 9 hens, commuted to 2d. The mill was called Fulborne Mill in 1608. It was owned at that time by James I but sold by him shortly afterwards. Edward Hickmut was the occupier of the mill in 1694. In 1768, the mill was described as "two water corn mills under one roof". It was then in the occupation of Thomas Stiles. Alexander Bottle was the miller from 1782–1797. He rebuilt the mill in 1796, which date was to be seen on the mill. This was a corn mill with an overshot waterwheel driving two pairs of millstones, one pair of French Burrs and one pair of Peaks. William Hudson was the miller from 1847–1855. Thomas Clark (1838–1929) was the miller through the second half of the nineteenth century, taking the mill c. 1861. He was the miller until the mill stopped working. The waterwheel was later replaced by a turbine. Milling at Fairbourne ceased in 1908. Although the waterwheel was never at a loss for water to supply it, it could only work one of the two pairs of millstones at any one time. The mill building remains, empty of machinery.

== Hollingbourne Stream or Snagbrook (Len tributary). ==
The Hollingbourne Stream rises at the foot of the North Downs, and flows for 1 1/4 miles (2.0 km) to the River Len. It powered four mills. Alternative names for the stream are the Snagbrook and the Snakebrook.

=== Manor Mill. ===
TQ 843 552 51°15′58″N 0°38′24″E

A mill may have stood on this site since 980, when King Edelstane gave Holyngbourne to Christ Church, Canterbury, and almost certainly since Domesday. In 1591 the mill was in the occupation of William Huxeley. In 1718 the mill pond was recorded as having an area of 1A 2R 16P (69,696 square feet (6,475.0 m^{2})). Robert Fairfax had leased the mill in 1759. The lease of the mill was in the ownership of John Spencer Culpeper and passed to Francis Child in 1762. In 1825, the mill pond was recorded as 1A 1R 1P (54,722 square feet (5,083.8 m^{2})). In 1839 the mill was leased by the Earl of Jersey. In 1868 the pond had decreased in size to 3R 13P (36,209 square feet (3,363.9 m^{2})). John Clark (1832–1873) was a miller here at one time. The mill and house were rebuilt in 1880 and the miller from this time until 1925 was a Mr. Wratten. The main axle of the watermill broke in 1925 thus bringing an end to the working life of the mill. The mill had an overshot waterwheel 10 feet (3.05 m) diameter and some 3 feet (0.91 m) wide of composite construction and powered three pairs of millstones via a lineshaft. The mill building survives with its waterwheel but devoid of machinery.^{D}

=== Eyhorne Mill. ===
TQ 835 546 51°15′39″N 0°37′52″E

This corn mill may have been owned by Edward Laws in 790. It was at work in 1839 when the owner was James Bunyard and the miller was John Symmonds. In 1855, the miller may have been John Adley. It last worked sometime between 1885 and 1898, when it was marked as disused on the Ordnance Survey map. The mill stood downstream of the bridge and on the east bank of the stream. The waterwheel was probably breastshot as the head was only some 6 feet (1.83 m) or 7 feet (2.13 m). The mill was disused by 1898.^{B}^{,} ^{D}

=== Grove (Cotteram's, Old) Mill ===
This was probably a corn mill originally, later converted to a fulling mill. During the eighteenth and nineteenth centuries it was a paper mill. In 1803, Cotteram's Mill was being worked by Stroud and Newman and in 1839 Grove Mill was being worked by Edward and Charles Horsenails, papermakers. The mill was a corn mill by 1847. Alfred Reginald Fremlin was the miller in 1855. The mill was recorded as having been converted back to a paper mill in 1876 although John Charles Friday was the miller in 1882. The mill was working until at least 1885. The building was later demolished.^{B}^{,} ^{D}

=== Park (New) Mill. ===
This was probably a corn mill originally, later converted to a fulling mill. During the eighteenth and nineteenth centuries it was a paper mill. James Austen of Chatham insured a new-built paper mill at Hollingbourne in 1762. William Avery, papermaker, was the tenant in 1764. Robert Williams insured his utensils and stock in a paper mill at Hollingbourne in 1775. In 1816, Thomas Stroud and Daniel Denny Newman were master papermakers at New Mill. In 1847 this mill was producing pasteboard. The mill was later known as Park Mill, being in the occupation of "The New Hollingbourne Mill Paper Mills Company Ltd.", this being post-1862, when the Companies Act established Limited Liability Companies. The mill was recorded as Hollingbourne Paper Mills in Bartholomew's Gazetteer of 1887. A paper making machine from this mill was sold to Messrs. Wiggins Teape in 1892. It was installed in Buckkland Paper Mill, Dover. The mill was later demolished. The waterwheel was probably breast-shot, and about 12 feet (3.66 m) diameter.^{B}^{,} ^{D}

== Leeds Stream (Len tributary) ==
=== Le Nethertoune Mill, Leeds. ===
TQ 823 534 51°15′02″N 0°36′48″E

This mill stood probably had a breastshot or undershot waterwheel as the head available would only have been some 4 feet (1.22 m). It was a fulling mill recorded as being "in ruins" in 1466.^{B}

=== Abbey Mill, Leeds. ===
TQ 823 531 51°14′53″N 0°36′40″E

Probably a Domesday site and one of the five mills owned by the Townsmen of Leeds. Leeds Priory was surrendered in 1539 and in 1540 the King leased the site of Leeds Priory and all houses, mills etc. to Sir Anthony St Leger for 21 years. The St Leger family continued the lease until 1573 when it passed firstly to the Norden family and then to William Covert and later his son, William. In 1609, the estate was sold to Sir William Meredith, in whose family it remained until the eighteenth century. In 1789, and indenture between John Calcroft and Thomas William mentioned that the mill was formerly in the possession of Thomas Crisp. George Blinkhorn was the miller from 1843–1874 and Alfred Blinkhorn was the miller from 1895 - 1922. The mill was marked on the first 6" OS map of Kent in 1865. It had a cast iron overshot waterwheel 16 feet 8 inches (5.08 m) diameter and 3 feet 4 inches (1.02 m) wide by Weeks of Maidstone. The cast iron Pit Wheel was 8 feet 6 inches (2.59 m) diameter with wooden cogs. The waterwheel drove three pairs of millstones via two lineshafts, each driven by a 2 feet (610 mm) diameter cast iron gear. One shaft drove a single pair of 48 inches (1.22 m) diameter French Burr millstones by a 5 feet (1.52 m) diameter cast iron face gear with wooden cogs and the other shaft drove two pairs of French Burr millstones by 5 feet 6 inches (1.68 m) diameter cast iron face gears with wooden cogs. One pair of stones was 48 inches (1.22 m) diameter and the second pair 40 inches (1.02 m) diameter. Both lineshafts were of oak, 12 inches (300 mm) square. The mill was derelict but intact in 1936 but partly demolished later, with only the ground floor remaining. Some machinery still remains in the mill.^{D}

=== Priory (North) Mill, Leeds ===
TQ 823 530 51°14′49″N 0°36′40″E

The mill was first recorded as belonging to James I in 1608, known then as North Mill. The site of this mill was recorded on a map of 1821. In 1834, only a few fragments of the mill walls remained. The head would have been around 5 feet (1.52 m), suggesting a breastshot waterwheel.

== Bearsted Stream (Len tributary) ==
A stream rises above Bearsted. It powered two mills.

=== Aldington Mill, Thurnham ===
TQ 812 573 51°17′10″N 0°35′49″E

Aldington mill was a Domesday mill. In 1269 it was held by William de Cobeham.

=== Lower Milgate Mill, Bearsted. ===
TQ 802 552 51°16′02″N 0°35′03″E

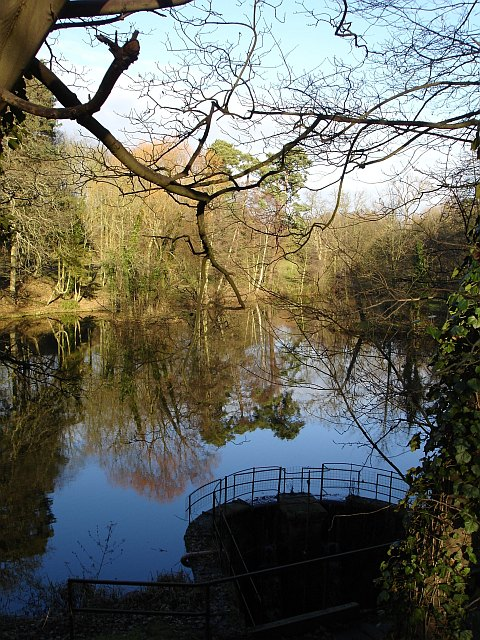
Millpond

This mill stood was part of a small estate known as The Comb. It was in existence during the first half of the eighteenth century, appearing on a map of 1707 which was partly resurveyed in 1746.^{B}

== Cossington Stream. ==
A stream rises at Cossington and enters the Medway from the right at Aylesford. It powered a watermill.

=== Cossington Mill. ===
This was a corn mill.

== East Malling Stream. ==
The East Malling Stream enters the Medway from the left at Aylesford. The Domesday Book recorded two mills worth 10/- at Metlinge (East Malling). In 1363 there were two mills in the village. East Malling possessed a fulling mill from 1567 to 1719, most likely to have been Middle Mill. Thomas Tomlyn was a miller in the seventeenth century, Thomas Pidgeon, corn miller of East Malling died in 1685, In 1706 there were three mills - Upper, Weir and Middle Mills. The history of the paper mills needs to be read together, as they were all linked through various owners.^{C}

=== Upper Mill, East Malling. ===
TQ 697 571 51°17′16″N 0°26′05″E

James Brooks was the at the mill in 1752, when the mill was rated at £61, increasing to £122 in 1757. By 1764 the mill was operating as a paper mill, James Brooks insuring the mill for £150 in that year. One of his apprentices wa Nicholas Tapsfield, who was later to work at the paper mill at Sundridge. In 1801 he insured the mill for £350 and died in 1805 aged 69. John Larking took the mill 1n 1806, it being then rated at £131. Larking went into partnership with John Morrice by 1816 and Morrice was recorded as at the mill from 1817-21. He was succeeded by William Blunden, who was working at Upper Mill in 1819, followed by Robert Tassell c.1823. The mill underwent considerable development between 1840 and 1860. It was demolished in the years between the First and Second World Wars. An illustration of Upper Mill can be seen here. The mill pond was some 200 yards (180 m) long, and covered an area of just over ½ acre in 1840. The mill had an overshot waterwheel of some 10 feet (3.05 m) diameter and 8 feet (2.44 m) wide, the remains of which were on site in 1972. The tail race discharged into the mill pond of Weir Mill.^{C}

=== Weir Mill, East Malling. ===
TQ 698 572 51°17′19″N 0°26′10″E

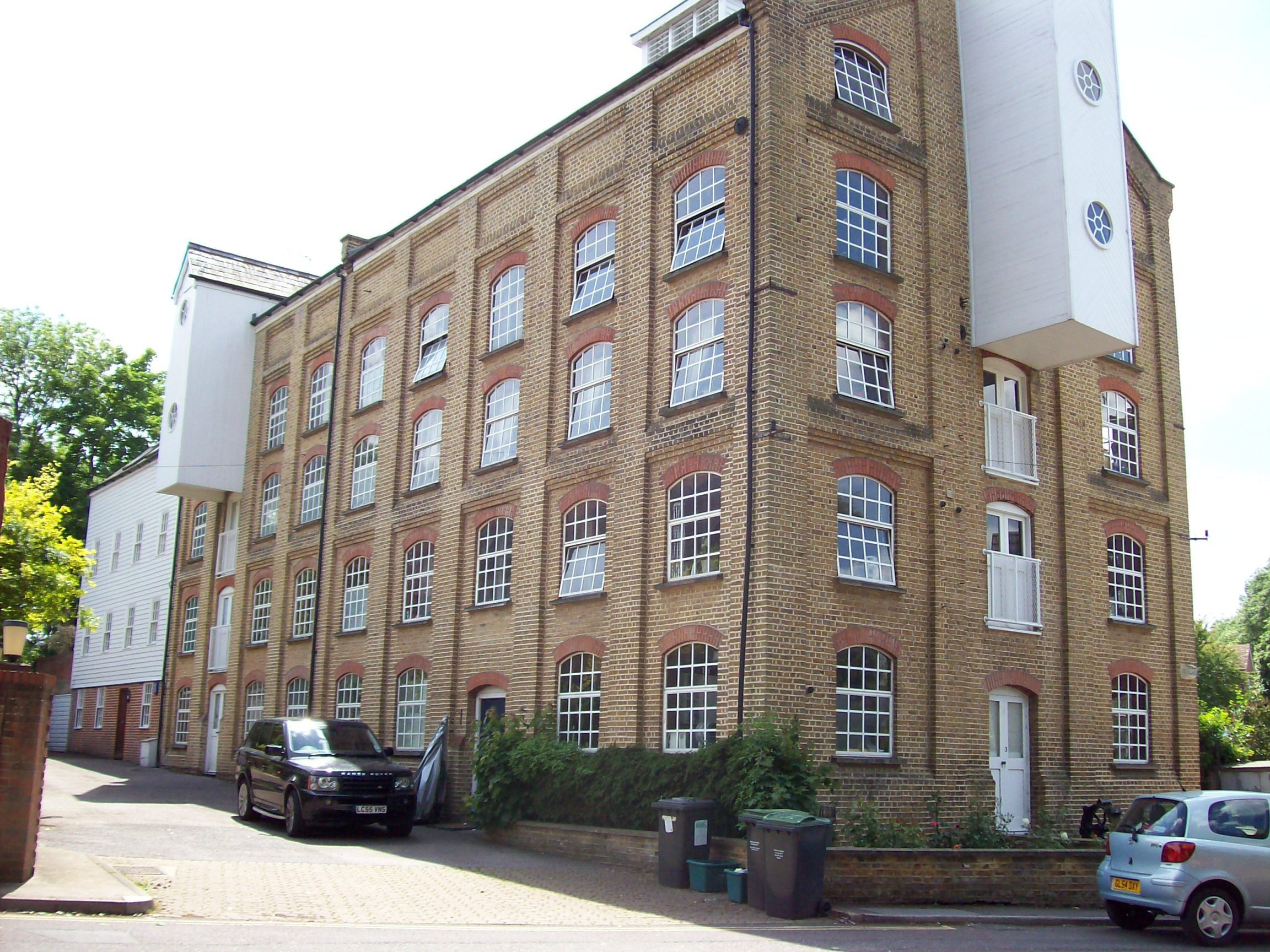
The converted mill

Probably one of the two Domesday mills. The mill was marked on a map of 1706. The next known mention of Wier Mill was in 1810 when the mill was marked on the map accompanying the enclosure award. In 1840 James Phillips was the owner-occupier of the mill, which was a water corn mill with 12 feet (3.66 m) waterwheel driving two pairs of stones. The pond of Weir Mill is roughly square in shape and covers an area of just over ¼ acre. The mill passed from James to Thomas Phillips c.1855 and to Mr. T J Dewe c,1893. G E Hide was working the mill in 1905 and S R Anscombe bought the mill in 1913. The mill last ground corn in 1930 and was bought by Whitbread Ltd., the Maidstone brewers, who used part of the mill to store hops. The mill subsequently passed into the ownership of Wm. Lillico & Son and was then used as a general store. During this time the timber part of the mill buildings were becoming derelict.

The surviving mill building

The timber clad original mill building dates from the reign of Queen Anne. A brick extension was added in two stages, the last part being built in 1889. Roller mills of 4½ sack capacity were installed c.1893 as was a boiler and steam engine, principally to drive the roller mills whilst the waterwheel drove the stones. The steam engine was a beam engine, it was eventually sold to a buyer in the USA.

The wooden mill

This is four storeys in height, the base being of brick and the upper storeys timber. The 12 feet (3.66 m) diameter waterwheel was overshot with eighty buckets and carried on a 9 inches (230 mm) diameter cast iron axle. The wooden upright shaft was only 6 inches (150 mm) diameter, reducing to 4 inches (100 mm) at first floor level. It carried a Great Spur Wheel and an iron Crown Wheel of 6 feet (1.83 m) diameter. This received a drive from the steam engine so that the mill could be driven that way if necessary. The mill drove three pairs of millstones.

The brick mill

This was built in two parts, latterly known as the "middle room" and the "end room", this last part being built in 1889. The mill was some six storeys in height, dwarfing the original mill. The middle room contained the roller mills, six in total.^{C}

=== Middle Mill, East Malling. ===
TQ 696 574 51°17′25″N 0°26′00″E

Probably one of the two Domesday mills. Middle Mill was in existence in 1684 when the pond was shown on a map drawn by Abraham Walter. In 1755 Richard Gowlett was the papermaker here, and in that year he took John Evernden and Elizabeth Sands as apprentices. He insured the mill for £35 in 1770 and he died c.1778, his widow Mary paying the rates on the mill until 1798 when the mill was sold to George Blunden. William Blunden was at the mill in 1816, but George Blunden was again recorded at the mill in 1824. He was recorded at a manufacturer of brown and white paper in 1832 and Francis Collins joined him in partnership that year. Robert Tassell acquired the mill c.1833 and went into partnership with Henry Smith in 1838. In 1841 there was an increase in the rateable value of the property from £54 to £150. The partnership was dissolved in 1848, all three mills being in the sole ownership of Robert Tassell from 1834 to 1838. The mill stood empty from 1848 to 1850, when the Busbridge brothers took over the running of the mills. They were involved in a Court case in 1859 over the discharge of foul water used in the paper making process. The mill pond covered an area of just over ½ acre. An illustration of Middle Mill can be seen here.^{B}^{,} ^{C}

=== Lower Mill, East Malling. ===
TQ 697 576 51°17′32″N 0°26′05″E

In 1792 Clement and George Taylor were granted a patent for the use of chlorine for bleaching rags for use in paper manufacture. James Whatman claimed that he was able to prove that several trials had already been made, including by Mr. Larking, who owned Lower Mill at that time. In 1816, John Larking and John Morrice were in partnership at both Upper and Lower Mills, the partnership being dissolved on 8 October of that year, John Morrice taking both mills. Robert Tassell took both mills by 1821, making both brown and white papers. He went into partnership with Henry Smith in 1838 and by 1844 they owned all three paper mills. This partnership was dissolved c.1844 and Henry Smith was the sole occupier of the three mills, worth together £420. In 1848 Lower Mill was recorded as empty and valued at £120. All three mills were managed by Thomas Harris Busbridge and George Frederick Busbridge from c.1849. It is likely that Lower Mill ceased regular production of paper in 1848, being used spasmodically until 1851, and closing completely by 1852. The mill seems to have been demolished by 1860, not appearing on the first 25-inch Ordnance Survey map. The mill pond is some 200 yards (180 m) long and 50 yards (46 m) wide, covering an area of just under 1½ acres (6,100 m^{2}).^{B}^{,} ^{C}

=== Church Mills, Ditton. ===
TQ 709 582 51°17′50″N 0°27′08″E

A Domesday site, one mill was recorded at Dictvne (Ditton) with a value of 10/-. Tenants of this corn mill include Edward Smith in 1724, J Whiteing from 1725–43, Thomas Shepard 1744-54, his widow in 1755-6, William Luck in 1757. Thomas Allchin was at the mill in 1840 and was still there in 1852. Joseph Jellis was the miller in 1887-90 and Robert Foster was the last known miller in 1905. The mill closed down c.1912. The mill is located close to the ford in Bradbourne Lane. In its later years the waterwheel was replaced by a turbine.^{C}

=== Mill Hall Mill, Aylesford. ===
TQ 715 589 51°18′12″N 0°27′41″E

This mill was marked on a map of 1684, it was a paper mill at that time. In 1695 Edward Middleton was working the mill, which then had a rateable value of £20. He was at the mill until 1724 when William Harris took it over. William Harris died in 1741 and his widow ran the mill until 1744 when Thomas Harris took it over. He was still at the mill in 1763 when he insured the mill for £100. in 1776 Thomas Golding insured the mill. He was still at the mill in 1803 but by 1812 his son Stephen Golding was recorded as a master paper maker of Ditton when he married. There was a partnership between Thomas Golding and his sons Stephen and Thomas jr which was dissolved in 1816. The artist Jean Claude Natteas (1785–1822) sketched the mill in 1816. In 1832, Robert Tassell took over the mill and it ceased to make paper by 1841. In 1841, Stephen Spratt was recorded as the occupier of the mill, by then a corn mill. he was at the mill until at least 1862, the next change of ownership being recorded as Charles Stonham & Sons in 1878. A steam engine was recorded at the mill in 1887, but had gone by 1890, when Walter Skinner was the miller, still there in 1895. Henry Packham was the last miller, there at least 1905-13, but the mill had stopped working by 1922. The machinery was removed and the building converted into stables by A E Reed & Co. Ltd. the mill was demolished c.1950 but the waterwheel survived until 1969. The mill was of three storeys, the base being of ragstone and the upper storeys of timber, clad in tarred weatherboarding. The overshot waterwheel was 14 feet (4.27 m) diameter and 6 feet (1.83 m) wide, mounted on a 9 inches (230 mm) square iron axle, driving an iron pit wheel. The iron pentrough was dated 1887. The final remains of Mill Hall Mill were demolished to make way for the foundations of a footbridge over the M20.^{B}^{,} ^{C}

== Boxley Stream ==
A stream rises at Boxley. It powered a watermill.

=== Sandling Mill ===
This mill was built as a papermill. William and Reuben Hunt were at the mill in 1839. It was later converted to a corn mill and was marked as such on nineteenth-century maps. In 1984, it was offered for sale with potential for conversion. Planning permission was granted in 1991 for house conversion, with a condition being made that the waterwheel was to be replaced. In 2005, the building burnt down, leaving the ragstone base standing.

== Addington Brook. ==
A stream enters the Medway from the left at Snodland. It powered six watermills.

=== Ford Place Mill, Wrotham. ===
TQ 635 585 51°18′07″N 0°20′47″E

This was a corn mill, in the Le Clerke family's ownership for many years, until the last member died in the Battle of Cropredy Bridge. The mill was later in the Best family's ownership. The eighteenth-century building remained in 1932, empty of machinery. The waterwheel was overshot approximately 15 feet (4.57 m) diameter and 3 feet (0.91 m) wide. The mill building was demolished in 1970 to construct the M26.^{A}^{,} ^{B}

=== Addington Mill. ===
TQ 656 587 51°18′12″N 0°22′36″E

This was a corn mill, demolished in the nineteenth century. The site now lies within the West Malling Golf Course.^{B}

=== Ryarsh Mill. ===
A Domesday site, Ryarsh Mill was a corn mill, last worked in 1930. The building dated from the late eighteenth century. The waterwheel was overshot.^{A}

=== Leybourne Mill. ===
TQ 687 585 51°18′02″N 0°25′15″E

A Domesday site Leybourne Mill was a corn mill. The waterwheel was overshot.^{A}

=== Ham Mill, Snodland. ===
This was a corn mill.

== Holborough Stream. ==
A stream rises above Snodland, and enters the river from the left downstream of the Addington Brook. It powered a watermill.

=== Holborough Mill. ===
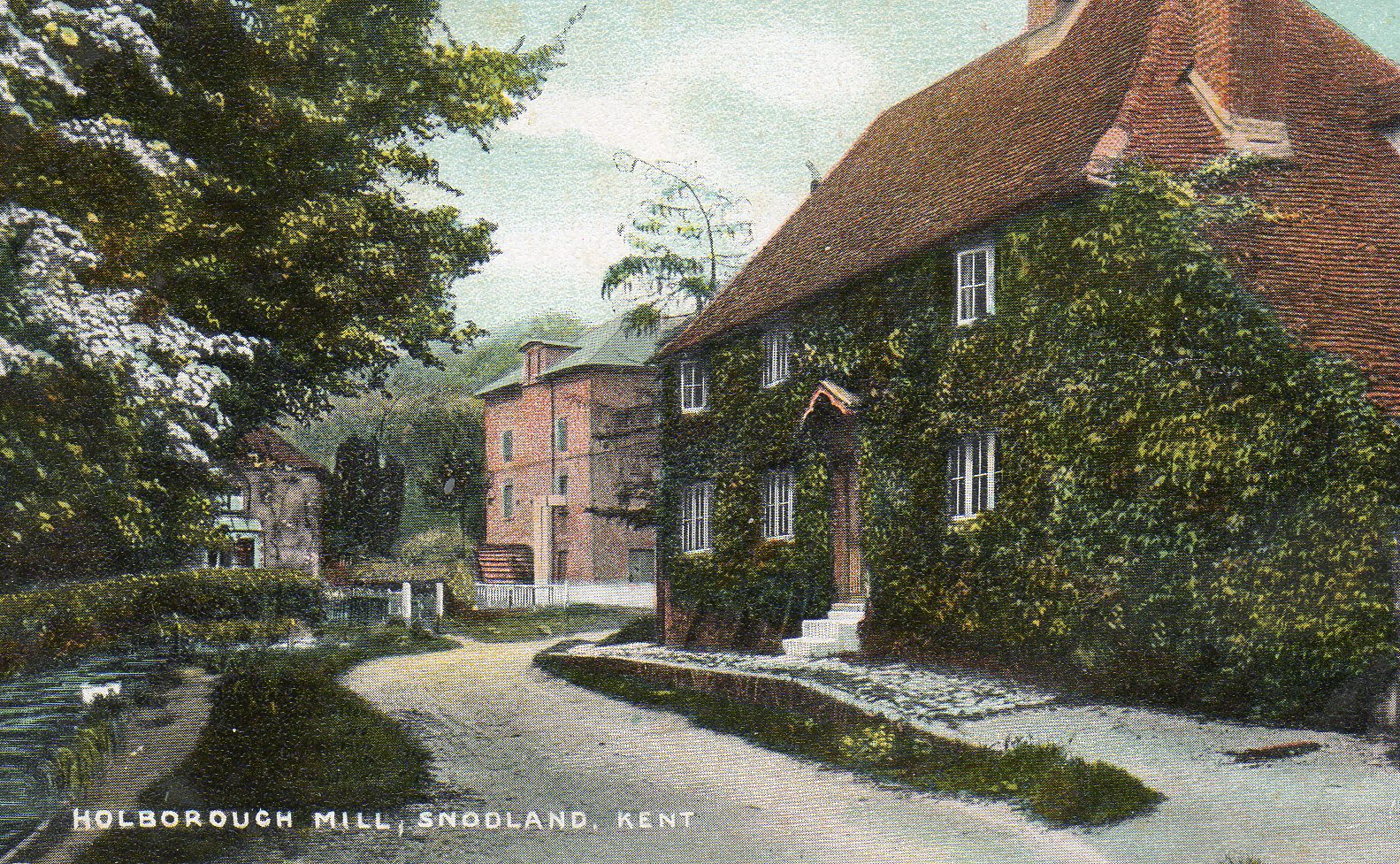
The mill c. 1908

A very ancient mill site, a mill was presented by King Egbert I of Kent to Bishop Beormond of Rochester in 836. In 1100 it was valued at £1. The mill had fallen into disrepair in the early fourteenth century, but was rebuilt by Bishop Hamo Hethe in 1322. The surviving mill building has a cast iron overshot waterwheel, 16 feet (4.88 m) diameter. It was a corn mill.^{A}

- ^A = Reid, Kenneth (1987). "Chapter 10". Watermills of the London Countryside, Vol 1. Cheddar, Somerset, UK: Charles Skilton Ltd. ISBN 0-284-39165-4.
- ^B = Fuller & Spain (1986). Watermills (Kent and the Borders of Sussex). Maidstone: Kent Archaeological Society. ISBN 0-906746-08-6.
- ^C = Fuller, Michael (1980). The Watermills of the East Malling and Wateringbury Streams. Maidstone: Christine Swift.
- ^D = Coles Finch, William (1933). Watermills & Windmills. London WC1: C W Daniel Company.
