= James Whatman =

James Whatman may refer to:

- James Whatman (politician) (1813–1887), English Liberal politician
- James Whatman (papermaker) (1702–1759), English paper maker

== See also ==
- Whatman (disambiguation)
