= Whatman =

Whatman may refer to:

== General ==
- Whatman plc, British papermaking company which now makes laboratory equipment
  - Whatman paper, historic wove paper produced by Whatman plc
- Whatman Park in Kent, England

== People ==
- Amherst Barrow Whatman (1909–1984), British wireless operator and radio engineer
- Arthur Whatman (1873–1965), English cricketer
- James Whatman (papermaker) (1702–1759) an English papermaker
- James Whatman (politician) (1813–1887), Liberal Member of Parliament for Maidstone and Western Kent
- James Whatman Bosanquet (1804–1877), English banker and writer
- Robert Whatman (born 1951), Australian rules footballer
- Thomas Whatman (1576-1630), MP
