= The Maplesden Noakes School =

Location
- Buckland Road; Maidstone, Kent; England; 51°16′49″N 0°30′36″E

Information
- Type: Academy
- Established: 1974; 52 years ago
- Trust: The Maplesden Noakes School
- Department for Education URN: 137833 Tables
- Ofsted: Reports
- Gender: Coeducational
- Age: 11 to 18
- Enrolment: 1180
- Capacity: 1040
- Houses: Knole, Hever, Chartwell
- Colours: Royal blue and Gold (Lower School [years 7&8]), Navy Blue and Gold (Upper School [years 9&10]) and Black (Year 11)
- Website: www.maplesden.kent.sch.uk

The Maplesden Noakes School is a coeducational secondary school and sixth form with academy status, in Maidstone, Kent, England. Since September 2005, the school has had a planned admission number of 180. The school's intake is regularly oversubscribed and has 1082 students on roll, of whom 207 are in the sixth form (as of February 2014).

The school is in a residential area not far from the town's centre. It occupies a 30-acre (120,000 m^{2}) site and shares its grounds with Maidstone Grammar School for Girls.

== History ==
The school opened in September 1974.

== Description ==
It is an average-sized school in an area where a significant proportion of students go to local grammar schools. It is a specialist business and enterprise college.

The proportion of disabled students and those with special educational needs supported at school action is well below the national average. The proportion of students supported at school action plus or with a statement of special educational needs is below average. The most common needs relate to behavioural, emotional and social difficulties. Less than one in 10 students is from minority ethnic groups, which is well below the national average. The proportion of students for whom the school receives the pupil premium (additional government funding for specific groups, including those known to be eligible for free school meals, looked after children and children from service families) is average. There are no service family children in the school. A relatively high proportion of Year 7 students is eligible for catch-up funding which is for students who did not achieve the expected Level 4 in reading or mathematics at the end of Key Stage 2.

It is surrounded on both sides by railway tracks, there is also a residential area on the west side and on the east side is Whatman Park.
