= Checkerboard and Playing Cards =

Drawing by Juan Gris

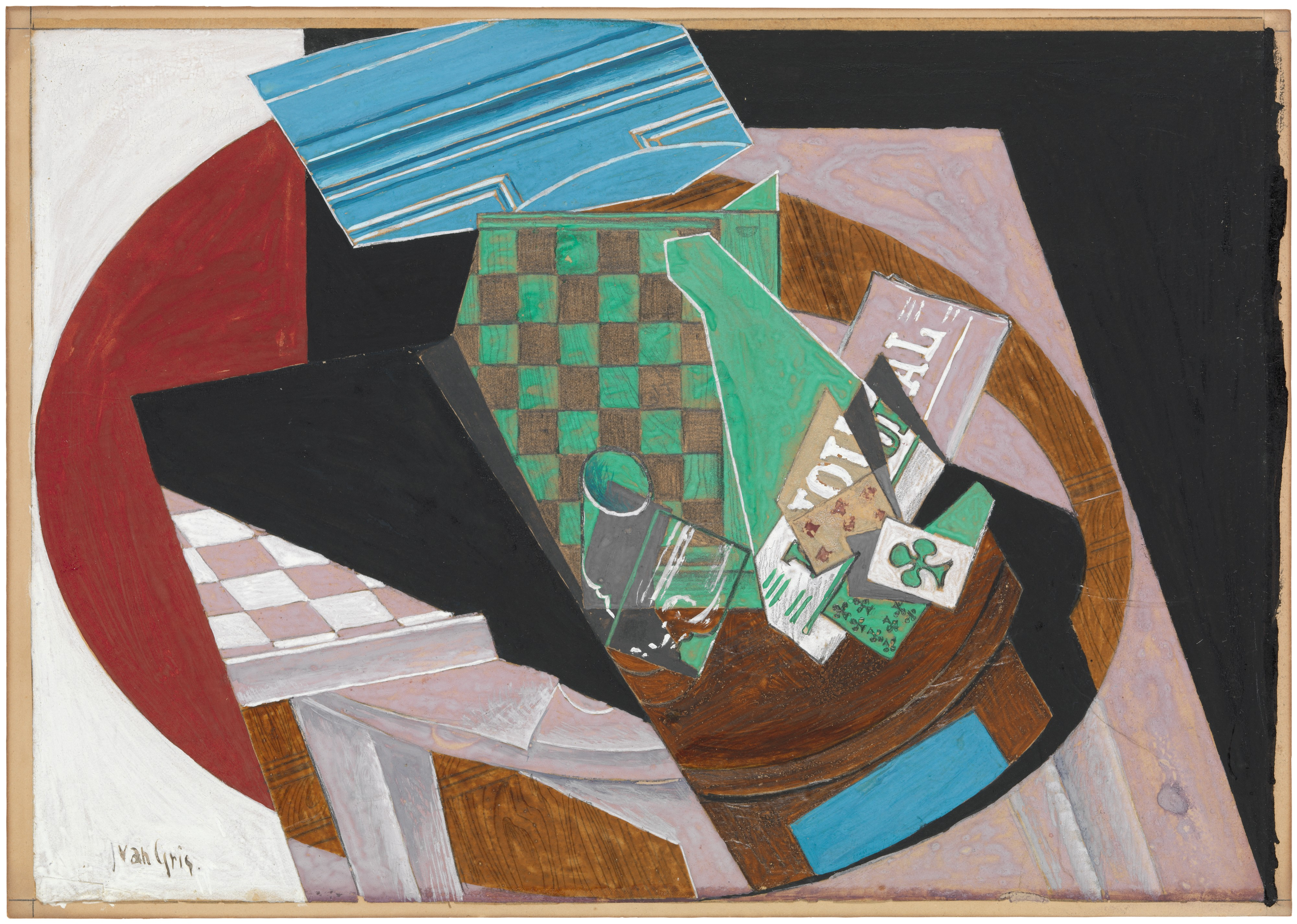
- Artist: Juan Gris
- Year: 1915
- Medium: Gouache, graphite, and resin on cream-colored wove paper and paperboard
- Dimensions: 21 cm × 29.8 cm (8.3 in × 11.7 in)
- Location: Metropolitan Museum of Art; New York

Checkerboard and Playing Cards is an early 20th century drawing by Spanish cubist Juan Gris. Done in gouache, graphite, and resin on wove paper, the drawing depicts a table set with a checkerboard and playing cards. Gris' work is in the collection of the Metropolitan Museum of Art, in New York.
