= Hataman =

Hataman is a surname. Notable people with the surname include:

- Benjamin Hataman, Filipino staff member charged with murder in the 2007 assassination of Wahab Akbar in Basilan
- Gulam S. Salliman-Hataman, Filipino politician
- Hadjiman Hataman Salliman (Jim Saliman) (Lakas-Kampi CMD), a Filipino politician, representative from the lone district of Basilan
- Mujiv Hataman, Filipino politician, party-list representative of Anak Mindanao (AMIN) in the House of Representatives

== See also ==
- Ataman
- Atamania
- Athamania
- Hat man
- Hatamen
- Hateman
- Hatman
- Hetman
- Hitman
- Hotman
- Otaman
- Whatman (disambiguation)
- Whatta Man
- Yattaman
