= Laid paper =

Paper with a ribbed texture

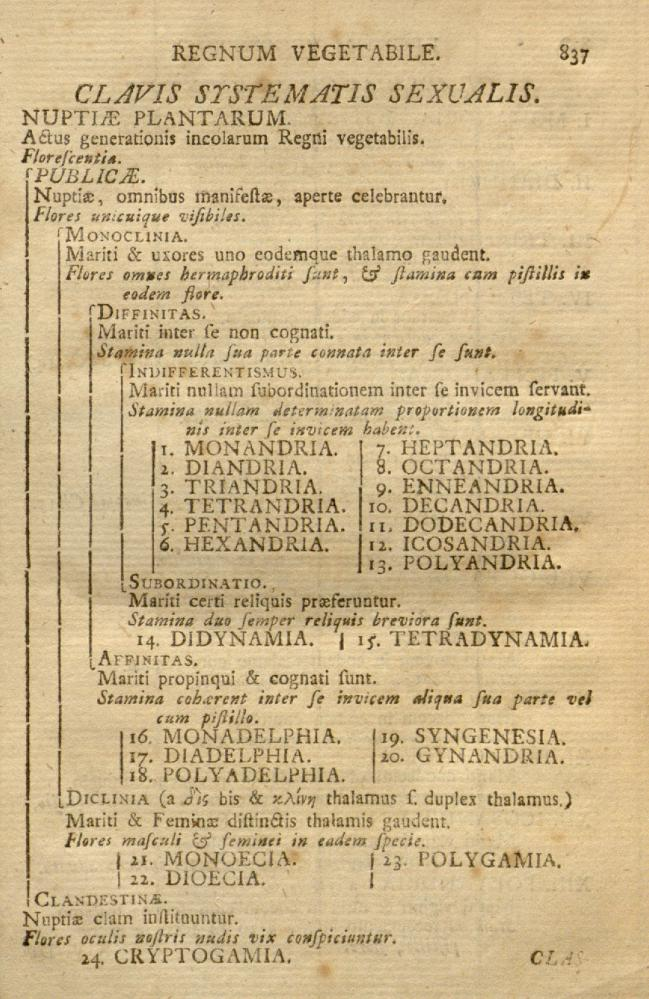
Laid paper from before the era of machine-made paper—leaf from Linnaeus's Systema naturae (1758)

Laid paper is a type of paper with a ribbed texture imparted by the manufacturing process. In the pre-mechanical period of European papermaking (from the 12th century into the 19th century), laid paper was the predominant kind of paper produced. Its use diminished in the 19th century, when it was largely supplanted by wove paper. Laid paper is still commonly used by artists as a support for charcoal drawings.

== Traditional production ==
Before the mechanization of papermaking, paper was made by hand, using a wire sieve mounted in a rectangular mould to produce a single sheet at a time. A papermaker would dip the mould into a vat containing diluted pulp of hemp or linen fibers, then lift it out, tilt it to spread the pulp evenly over the sieve and, as the water drained out between the wires, shake the mould to lock the fibers together. In the process, the pattern of the wires in the sieve was imparted to the sheet of paper.

Up until the invention of wove paper around 1756, these screens were made up of thicker, more widely spaced wires around which were woven finer and more tightly packed wires. The traditional laid pattern thus consists of a series of wide-spaced lines (chain lines) parallel to the shorter sides of the sheet and more narrowly spaced lines (laid lines) at right angles to the chain lines.

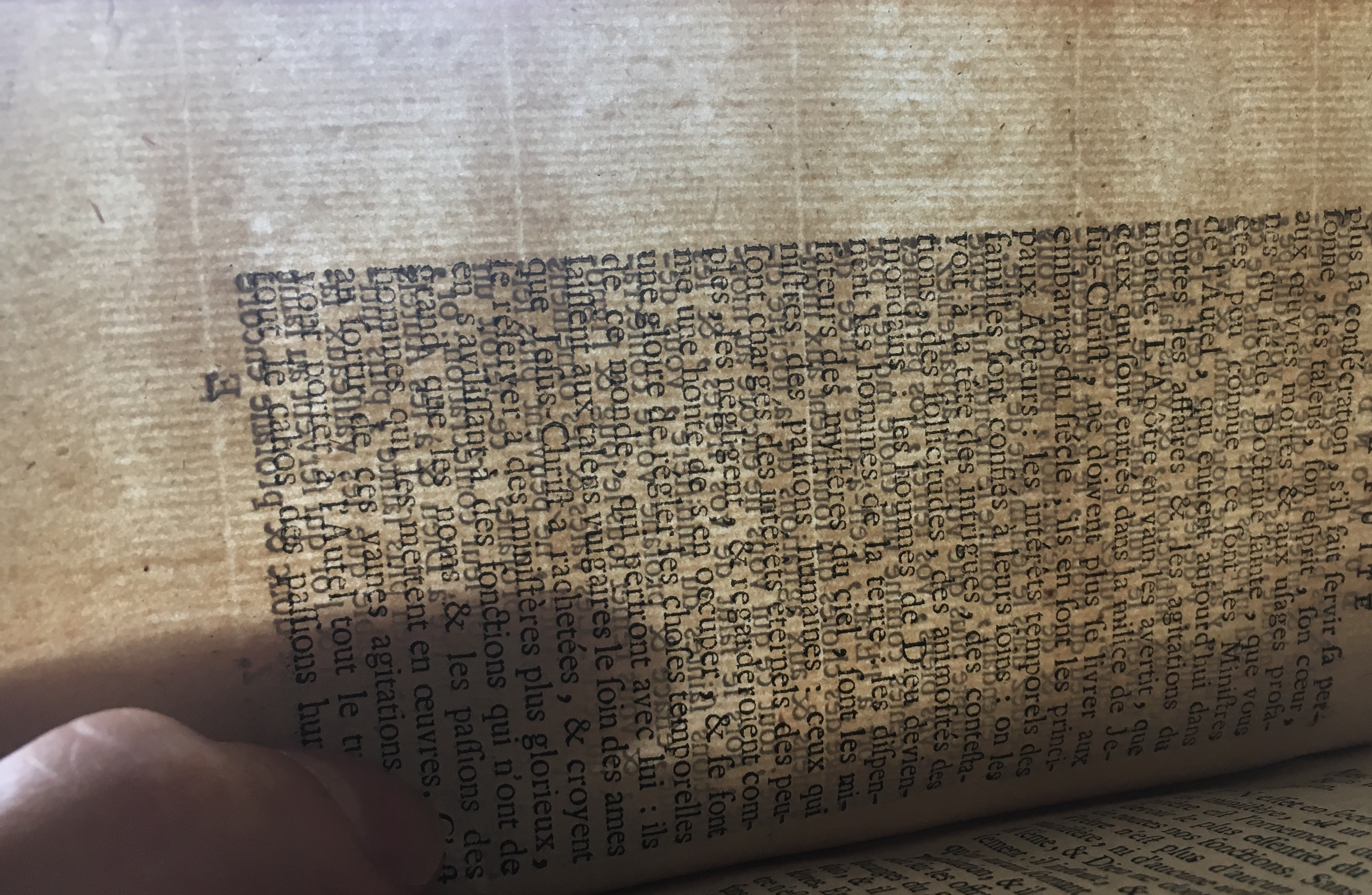
An example of "antique laid" paper, showing darker regions along the chain lines

A further distinction exists between what are called "antique laid" and "modern laid" papers. From the 12th century on, the chain wires of a paper mould were attached directly to wooden ribs in the frame itself. When the frame was pulled from the vat, these ribs produced a slight suction which pulled the water out of the newly formed sheet, and a slightly thicker layer of pulp was left across the top of the ribs. In a dried sheet, darker strips can be seen running along these chain lines when the sheet is held to the light. Improvements in mould making in the early 1800s lifted the chain wires slightly, resulting in a more evenly toned sheet.

== Modern production ==
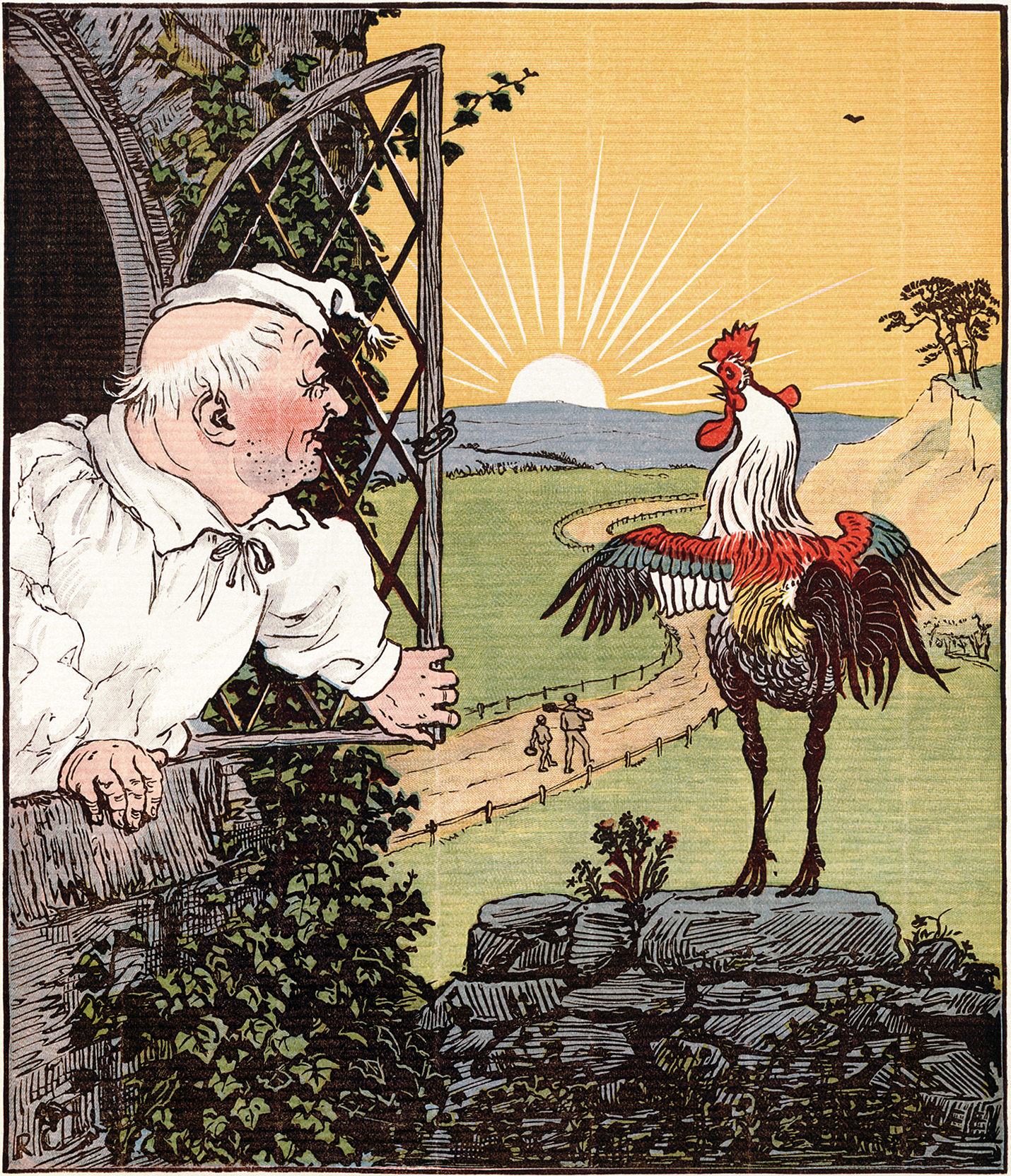
Visible laid pattern effect in a picture book illustration by Randolph Caldecott. Published 1887, digitally restored.

Modern papermaking techniques use a dandy roll to create the laid pattern during the early stages of manufacture, similar to the way a watermark is added to handmade papers. While in the wet state, the paper stock (a dilute dispersion of the cellulose fibers in water) is drained on a wire mesh to de-water the stock. During this process, a dandy roll with a laid mesh pattern is pressed into the wet stock, displacing the cellulose fiber. This pattern has to be applied at a particular stock consistency; otherwise the pattern will be lost as the fiber flows back while the stock moves past the dandy (too wet), or fiber will pick out of the stock (too dry), causing surface disruption. As the fiber is displaced, localized areas of higher and lower density are produced in a laid pattern, and the pattern is also created on the paper's surface. The pattern is therefore apparent both as one looks through the sheet and as one views its surface. Applying the laid pattern as a mechanical emboss would not create the ribbed pattern seen on looking through the sheet, as this is achieved only by watermarking techniques.

In machine-made paper, the chain lines run in the machine direction, along the length of the roll. The grain direction of a sheet (the orientation along which the majority of the cellulose fibers settle) is generally parallel to these chain lines.
