= Susanna Whatman =

English writer on household management (1753–1814)

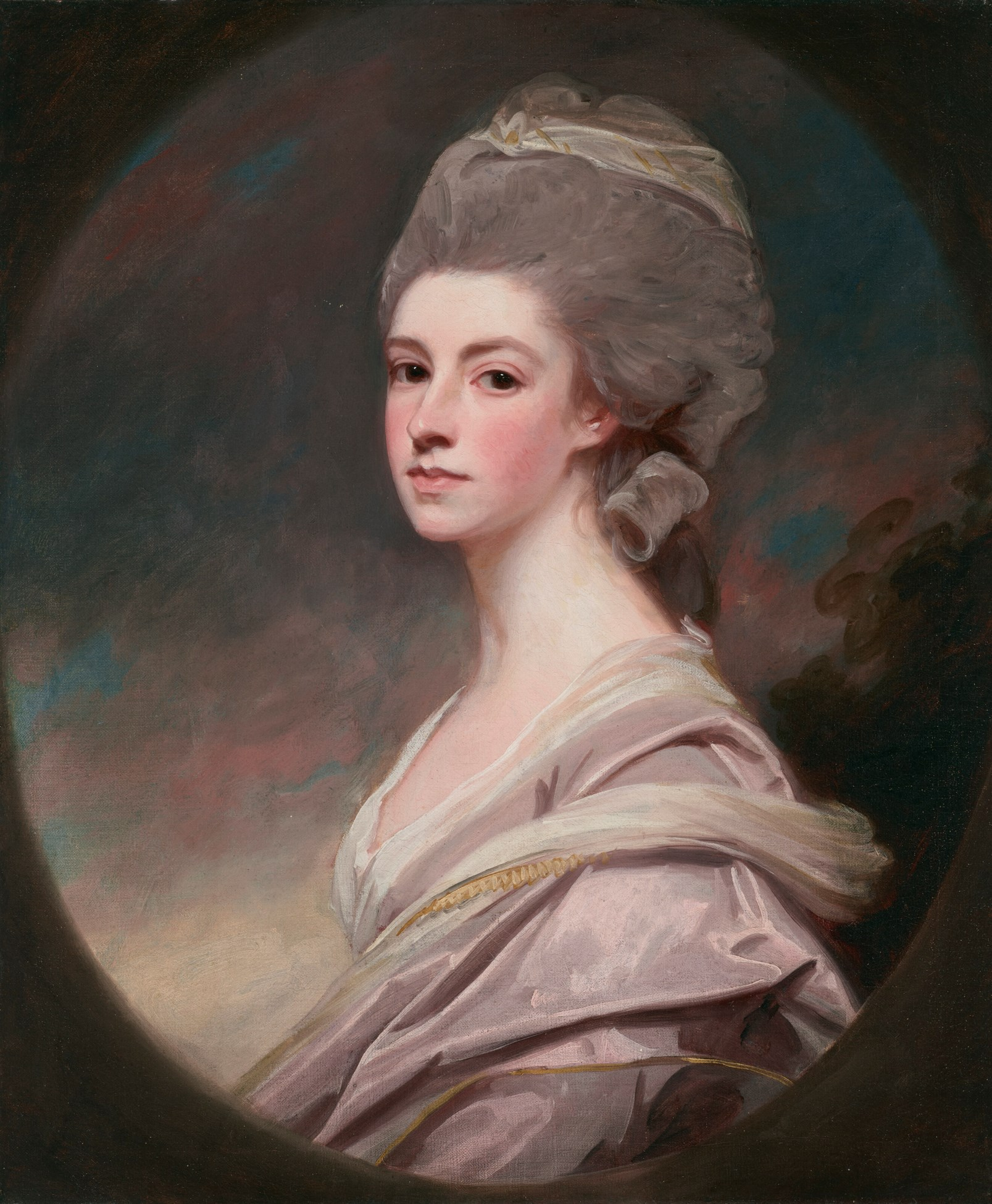
- painting by George Romney, 1778-1782.
- Born: Susanna Bosanquet; 23 January 1753; Hamburg, Holy Roman Empire
- Died: 29 November 1814 (aged 61); Baker Street, Westminster, London
- Writing career
- Notable work: Susanna Whatman: Her Housekeeping Book

Susanna Whatman (born Susanna Bosanquet) (23 January 1753 – 29 November 1814) was a British writer on household management who came to notice about 200 years after her birth.

== Life ==
Susannah was born in 1753 in Hamburg. She was the daughter of Jacob and Elizabeth Bosanquet. Her father was a director of the Levant Company and the East India Company. Her grandfather David Bosanquet was a Huguenot who had left France in 1686. Jacob Bosanquet was a sibling.

She married James Whatman (1741–1798) on 3 December 1776. He was the son of James Whatman (1702–1759), with whom he had created an innovative paper business in Kent. Her husband had been married before to Sarah (born Stanley) who had just died. He had two children from that marriage, Camilla, who married Sir Charles Style, Bart. and Letitia, who married Susanna's cousin, Samuel Bosanquet of Dingestow Court, son of the Governor of The Bank of England.

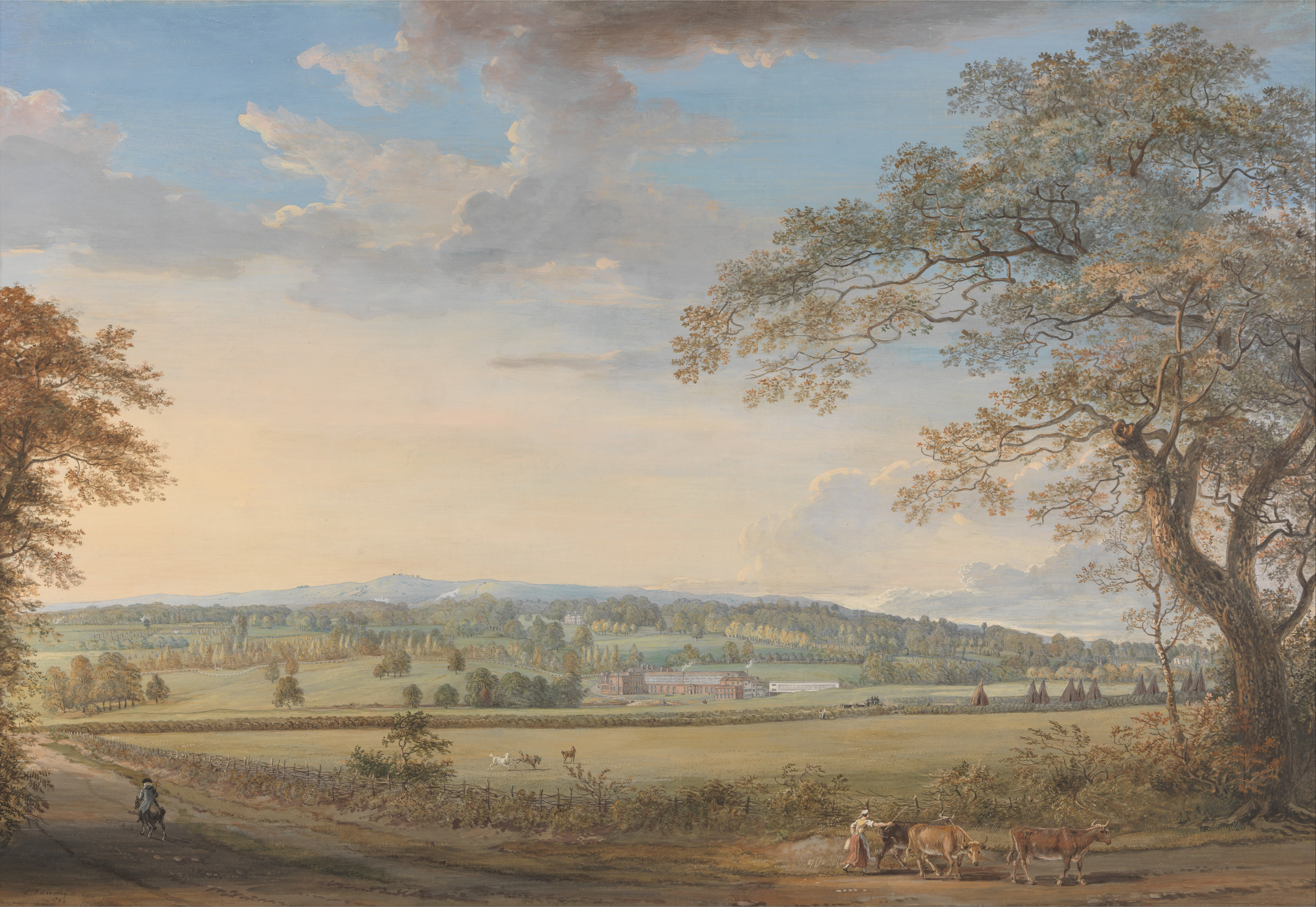
"A View of Vinters at Boxley, Kent, with Mr. Whatman's Turkey Paper Mills" by Paul Sandby in 1794

Susannah became the head of the household at their home near Maidstone called Turkey Court. In her first year, 1776, there she wrote down a detailed set of instructions for their servants in household management. She would add to and improve these notes over the next 24 years including when they moved to "Vinters" in 1782. Her husband had bought the house, at Boxley in Kent, a few years before and £5,000 was spent on the house when they moved in. There is a painting by Paul Sandby which shows Vinters in 1794 and the paper mills that had created the family's income. Her husband died in 1798 having sold the mills years before when he had a stroke. Whatman's son, James, married his cousin, Eliza Susanna Gaussen, daughter of Samuel Robert Gaussen of Brookmans Park, Hertfordshire.

== Death and legacy ==
Whatman died in Baker Street in 1814. Her writings received no notice until 1952 when Susanna Whatman: Her Housekeeping Book was published. Her writing shows that although her houses had many rooms, Whatman demonstrates that she had an intimate knowledge of each room and its contents. She knew how the sun would enter a room and she appreciated the damage it could inflict on carpets and decorations if the sun was not kept from the room.

Vinters, was a Whatman family home for many years. It was requisitioned for work during the second world war and it was demolished some time after 1956. The grounds are now (2020) a nature reserve and open to the public.
