= Whatman Park =

Location in Maidstone, Kent, England

Coordinates: 51°16′55″N 0°30′49″E

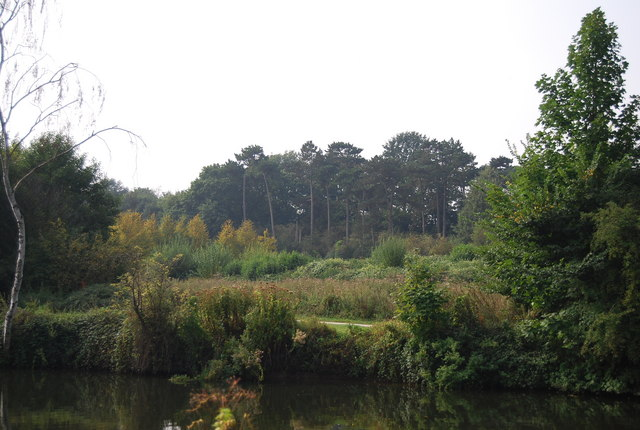
- Interactive map of Whatman Park
- Nearest town: Maidstone, England
- Opened: 2001

Whatman Park, known locally as Millennium Park, is a 18-acre (0.073 km^{2}) park in Maidstone, Kent. It lies along the River Medway, around 0.5 miles (0.8 km) from the town centre, and is named after the Whatman papermaking factory nearby, in operation from 1740 until 2014, at the site at Springfield Mill.

== History ==
The park was opened by Terry Waite and the then-Mayor of Maidstone Paulina Stockell in 2001 as part of the millennium celebrations, using money provided by the National Lottery's 'lasting legacy project'. To mark the Millennium, hundreds of young children's hand and footprints were used as part of an art installation, as well as a piece of public art in the form of a 60-yard long double helix by Scottish sculptor David Annand.

In recent years the park has hosted the Maidstone Mela, an annual world art, music and food festival, as well as various open air cinema events.

== Facilities ==
The park features two children's playgrounds, a skate park, boardwalks which run through trees, an open air stage — the riverstage. Both of the river boats, the Kentish Lady and Allington Belle have request stops in the park.
