= Whatman PLC =

Whatman PLC (part of Cytiva)
- Company type: Product brand
- Founded: 1740; 286 years ago in Maidstone, Kent, United Kingdom
- Founder: James Whatman
- Headquarters: Little Chalfont, Buckinghamshire, United Kingdom
- Website: cytivalifesciences.com/whatman

Whatman PLC is a Cytiva brand specialising in laboratory filtration products and separation technologies.

Whatman products cover a range of laboratory applications that require filtration, sample collection (cards and kits), blotting, lateral flow components and flow-through assays and other general laboratory accessories.

Formerly Whatman PLC, the company was originally acquired in 2008 by GE Healthcare, which became Cytiva in April 2020.

== History ==
=== Founder's innovation and impact ===
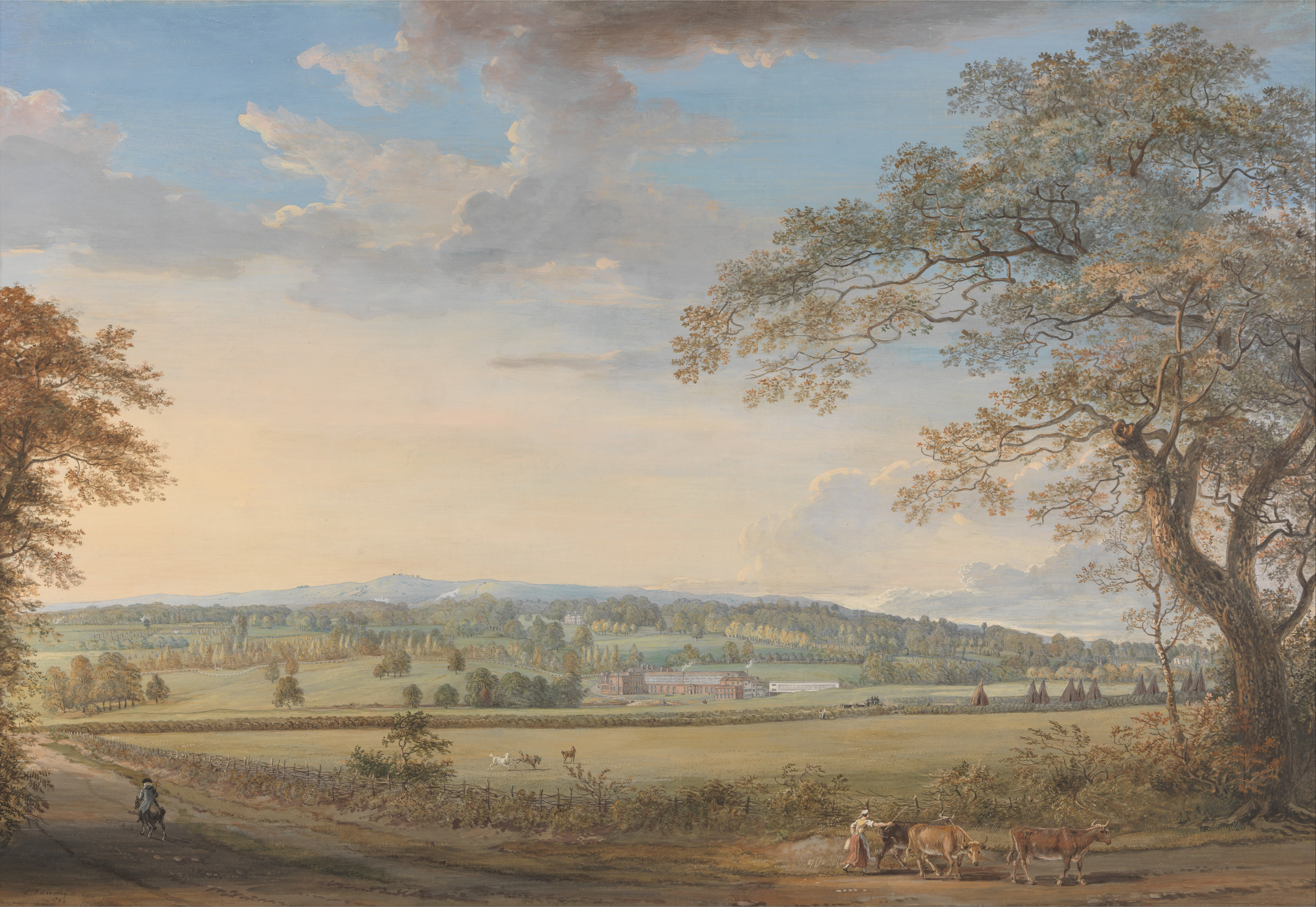
Mr. Whatman's Turkey Paper Mills by Paul Sandby (1794)

The papermaker James Whatman the Elder (1702–1759) founded the Whatman papermaking enterprise in 1740 in Maidstone, Kent, England. He made revolutionary advances to the craft in England and is credited as the inventor of wove paper (or Vélin), an innovation used for high-quality art and printing. His son, James Whatman the Younger (1741–1798), further developed the company's techniques. At a time when the craft was based in smaller paper mills, Whatman innovations led to the large-scale and widespread industrialisation of paper manufacturing.

John Baskerville (1707–1775), who needed paper that would take a light impression of the printing plate, approached Whatman; the resultant paper was used for the edition of Virgil's poetry, embellished with Baskerville's typography and designs. The earliest examples of wove paper, bearing his watermark, appeared after 1740.

The Whatman business is credited with the invention of the wove wire mesh used to mould and align pulp fibres. This is the principal method used in the mass production of most modern paper. The Whatmans held a part interest in the establishment at Turkey Mill, near Maidstone, after 1740; this was wholly acquired through the elder Whatman's marriage to Ann Harris.

"Handmade" paper bearing the Whatman's mark continued in production for special editions and art books until 2002.

=== Acquisition ===
On 4 February 2008 GE Healthcare, a unit of General Electric, acquired Whatman PLC at 270p per share in cash for each Whatman share, valuing Whatman at approximately £363 million (approximately $713 million.) Last production at Maidstone (Springfield Mill) occurred on 17 June 2014.

== Key products and technologies ==
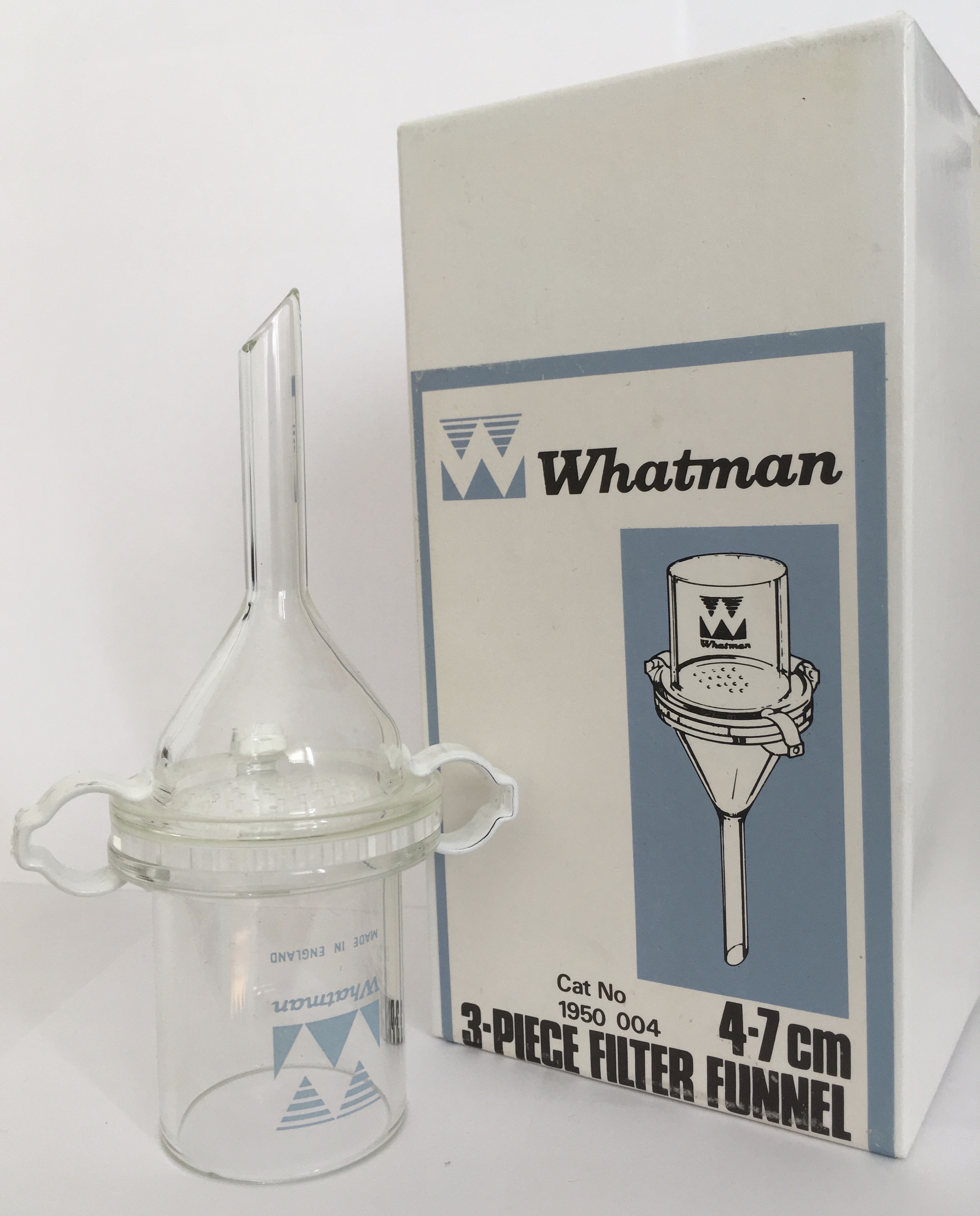
Whatman 3-piece filter funnel

The Whatman product range covers

- Laboratory filtration products: filter papers, membrane filters, syringe filters, syringeless filters, microbiology, microplates, and capsule filters
- Sample collection cards and kits: FTA, FTA Elute, and 903 ranges
- Blotting: blotting membranes, blotting papers, and equipment
- Components for lateral flow and flow-through assays: membranes for immunoassays, conjugate release, blood separators, absorbents, and sample pads
- General laboratory accessories: extraction thimbles, weighing papers, test and chromatography papers, lens-cleaning tissue, and Benchkote papers
