= James Whatman (papermaker) =

English papermaker 1702–1759 UK

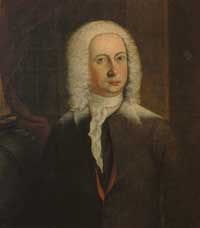
James Whatman (1702–1759)

James Whatman (1702–1759), the Elder, was a paper maker, born in Kent, who made revolutionary advances to the craft in England. He is noted as the inventor of wove paper (or Vélin), an innovation used for high-quality art and printing. The techniques continued to be developed by his son, James Whatman the Younger (1741–1798). At a time when the craft was based in smaller paper mills, his innovations led to the large scale and widespread industrialisation of paper manufacturing.

== Life ==
Whatman was the last child and only son of Mary and James Whatman. His father was a tanner and his son inherited the business in 1726 when his mother died. This Whatman continued the tanning business but in 1733 he was starting to make paper at the Old Mill in Hollingbourne. He assisted James Harris who built a new paper mill there. Harris died in 1739 and Whatman married his widow and gained Harris's business.

This James Whatman had been approached by John Baskerville, who needed paper that would take a light impression of the printing plate; this was used for the edition of Virgil's poetry, embellished with Baskerville's typography and designs. The earliest examples of wove paper, bearing his watermark, appeared after 1740.

This James Whatman and his wife had a child in 1741 who was also named James Whatman and who would later be another innovative paper manufacturer. His wife Susanna Whatman would run his house; her writing on household management would come to notice about 200 years later.

The business, in addition to producing the finest paper, is probably responsible for the invention of the wove wire mesh used to mould and align the pulp fibres. This is the principal method used in the mass production of most modern paper. The Whatmans held a part interest in the establishment at Turkey Mill, near Maidstone, after 1740; this was acquired through the elder Whatman's marriage to Ann Harris.

The "handmade" paper bearing the Whatman's mark was still produced for special editions and art books until 2002.

The company he founded, Whatman plc, later specialized in producing filter papers and is now owned by GE Healthcare. Last production at Maidstone (Springfield Mill) was in 2014.

Whatman's name has entered many languages, e.g. the French (le whatman) and the Russian, where ватман (vatman) is a generic word for heavy high-quality paper used for drawing and watercolors.

== See also ==
- Thomas Balston
