= Wove paper =

Writing paper with a uniform surface, not ribbed or watermarked

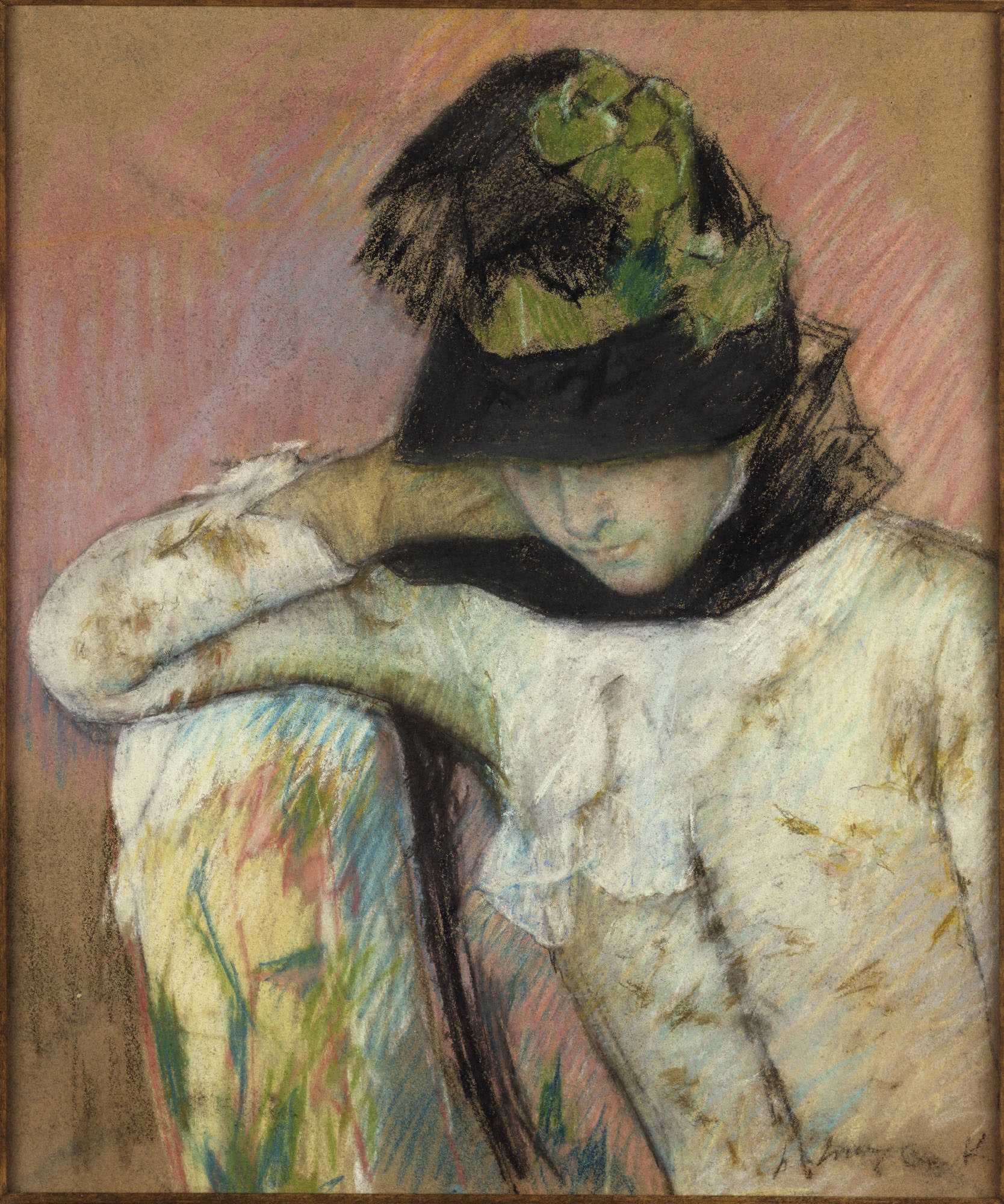
Mary Cassatt, Young Woman in a Black and Green Bonnet, 1890, pastel on tan wove paper, Princeton University Art Museum

Wove paper is a type of paper first created centuries ago in East Asia, and subsequently introduced to England, Europe and the American colonies in the mid-eighteenth century. Hand-made wove paper was first produced by using a wooden mould that contained a finely-woven brass vellum (wire cloth), upon which the paper pulp was applied and dried, creating a smooth, uniform surface.

== History ==
Prior to the mid-nineteenth century, paper pulp consisted of cotton and linen rags that were mixed with water and reduced to a fibrous material that was applied to the mould. The appearance of wove paper differs from that of laid paper, which produced a more textured surface due to the manner in which the wire mesh within the paper mould was constructed. The traditional laid pattern consisted of a series of wide-spaced lines (chain lines) parallel to the shorter sides of the sheet and more narrowly spaced lines (laid lines) at right angles to the chain lines.

While the technique of manufacturing wove paper in the Orient originated using natural materials such as fabric and bamboo to create mesh within the mould, eighteenth-century laid and wove paper modernized this process by using woven wire. The originator of the wove papermaking technique using wire appears to have been James Whatman the Elder (1702–1759) from Kent, England.

For approximately 500 years, European paper makers could only produce laid paper. In 1757, John Baskerville printed his famous edition of Virgil on this new kind of smooth paper, later referred to as wove (known in Europe as Vélin). The wove paper used in Baskerville's special edition of Virgil is now known to have been made by James Whatman.

=== Introduction to the Americas ===
America's introduction to wove paper came through the hands of Benjamin Franklin, who, during his tenure in England from 1757 to 1762, befriended John Baskerville, visiting his office in Birmingham on multiple occasions. Baskerville was revered for his continual improvements in typeface, press machinery, printing ink and wove paper in the mid-late 1750s. Franklin procured up to six copies of Baskerville's Virgil directly from the source, at which time paper historians believe Franklin was first acquainted with wove paper.

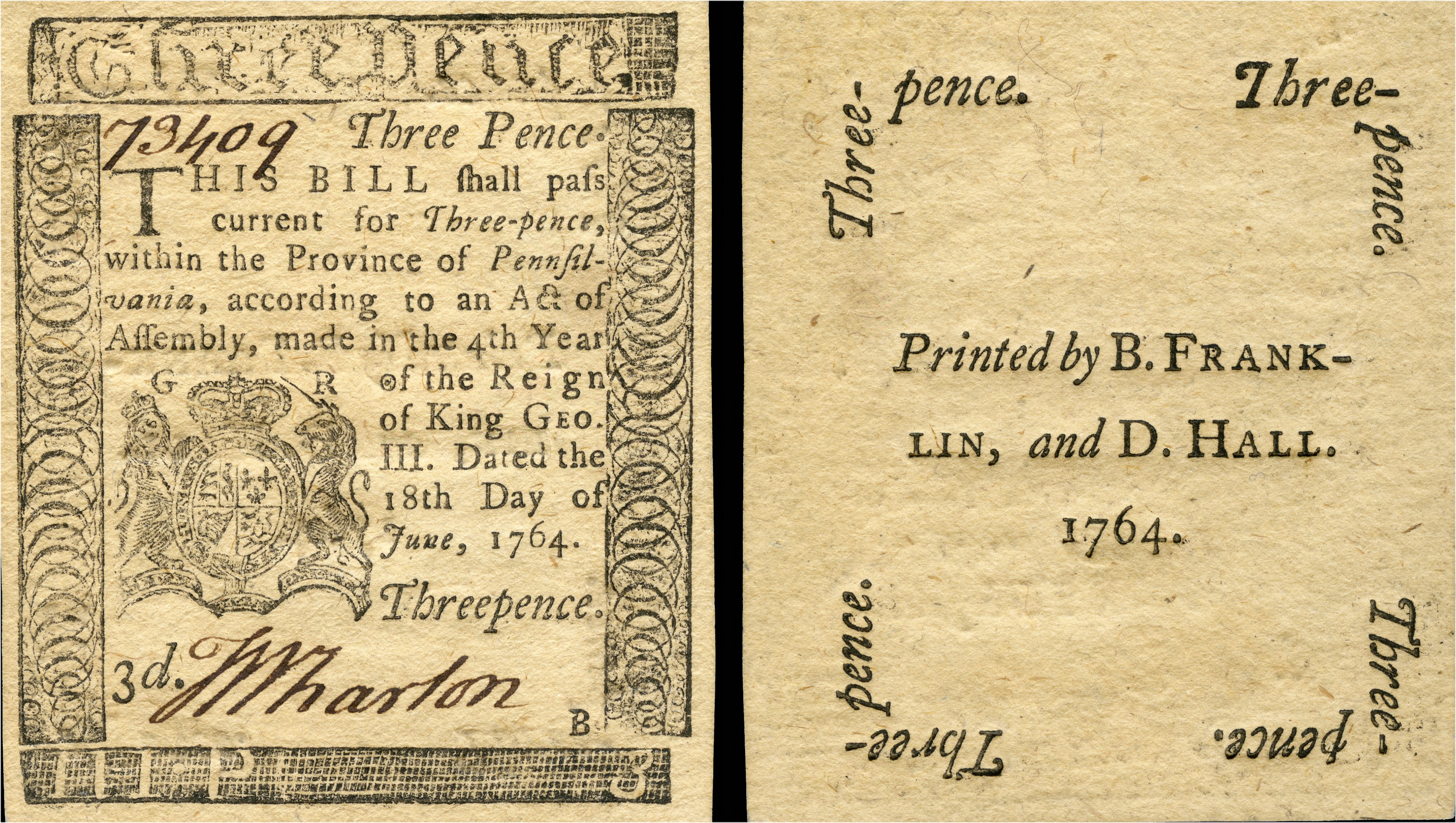
1764 colonial currency on wove paper, printed by Franklin & Hall; Philadelphia, PA

When Franklin returned to the American colonies in 1762, he decided to utilize this new type of paper first in printing colonial currency in Philadelphia. Examples of Franklin's use of wove paper in currency appear as early as 1764. This particular note, dated June 18, 1764, printed by Benjamin Franklin and David Hall was issued to the Province of Pennsylvania. Franklin became a great supporter of this superior paper type, and is credited for introducing wove paper to France in 1777.

The creation of wove paper in the American colonies originated through the paper mill of Thomas Willcox at his WIllcox Mill at Ivy Mills in Chester, Pennsylvania. Thomas Willcox and Benjamin Franklin maintained a collegial and personal relationship over decades of collaboration when Franklin ran the press of the Pennsylvania Gazette. Willcox supplied paper for the Gazette and was the exclusive provider of paper for the printing of colonial currency.

Franklin was aware of Whatman's new wove paper used in Baskerville's special edition of Virgil. As such, paper historians believe that Franklin potentially brought back wove wire moulds and samples of Whatman wove paper to the colonies upon returning in 1762 and, in turn, Franklin introduced this new papermaking technique to his close friend and colleague, Thomas Willcox to use in the manufacture of currency paper. 1764 was a pivotal year for colonial currency printing, as British statesman, George Grenville introduced the Currency Act, which attempted to prohibit the American colonies from producing their own currency. Franklin returned to England in November, 1764, in part, to diplomatically resolve England's monopolization of currency.

In response to deteriorating currency printed on laid paper, Franklin was keenly aware of the need to produce currency on a durable paper such as wove, and to increase paper manufacture throughout the colonies through paper mills such as the Willcox Mill.

Thomas Willcox employed the most skilled wire mould maker in the American colonies at this time, named Nathan Sellers. Nathan and his father, John Sellers were the first wove wire mould makers to produce wove paper through the Willcox Mill at Ivy Mills. Detailed account ledgers of the Sellers contain entries for the purchase of wove wire mould supplies as early as 1773.

During the 1770s in colonial America, wove paper was primarily created and used as a printing paper for currency, books, and bound account ledgers. Due to the paper crisis in 1776 resulting from the restriction of imported goods and paper supplies from England during the Revolutionary conflict, the production of laid and wove paper in the colonies was of utmost importance. Benjamin Franklin again led the charge for the collection of cotton and linen rags to make paper pulp, as well as the development of multiple paper mills in the colonies to ensure that essential paper production could flourish in America throughout the Revolution.

=== 19th century and modern history ===
With the establishment of the paper machine (1807), the manufacture of paper on a wove wire base would become the predominant standard in the world, with laid paper being relegated to certain specialist uses, such as being used as a support for charcoal drawings. Today more than 99% of the world's paper is made in this manner.

Wove paper is sought by artists for drawings and watercolor because its mould leaves virtually no impressions, reducing pooling and allowing smoother washes. By the 1780s, some wove papers were gelatin-sized ("ready-sized") for watercolor work. In commercial printing, wove (smooth) is a common uncoated stock, and brochures and presentation folders are among products typically printed on text and cover stocks.

== See also ==
- Papermaking

== Sources ==
- Balston, J.N. (1998). The Whatmans and Wove (Velin) Paper : Its Invention and Development in the West.
- Hills, R.L. (1988). Papermaking in Britain 1488-1988. Bloomsbury Publishing. ISBN 978-0485113464.
- Hunter, Dard (2011) [1943]. Papermaking: The History and Technique of an Ancient Craft. Dover Publications. ISBN 9780486236193.
