= Manor of Iron Acton =

The historic manor of Iron Acton was a manor centred on the village of Iron Acton in Gloucestershire, England, situated about 9 miles (14 km) north-east of the centre of the City of Bristol. The manor house, known as Acton Court is a Tudor (16th century) building which survives today, situated at some distance from the village and parish church of St Michael. It was long the principal seat of the prominent Poyntz family, lords of the manor, whose manorial chapel is contained within the parish church.

== Descent of the manor ==
=== de Acton ===
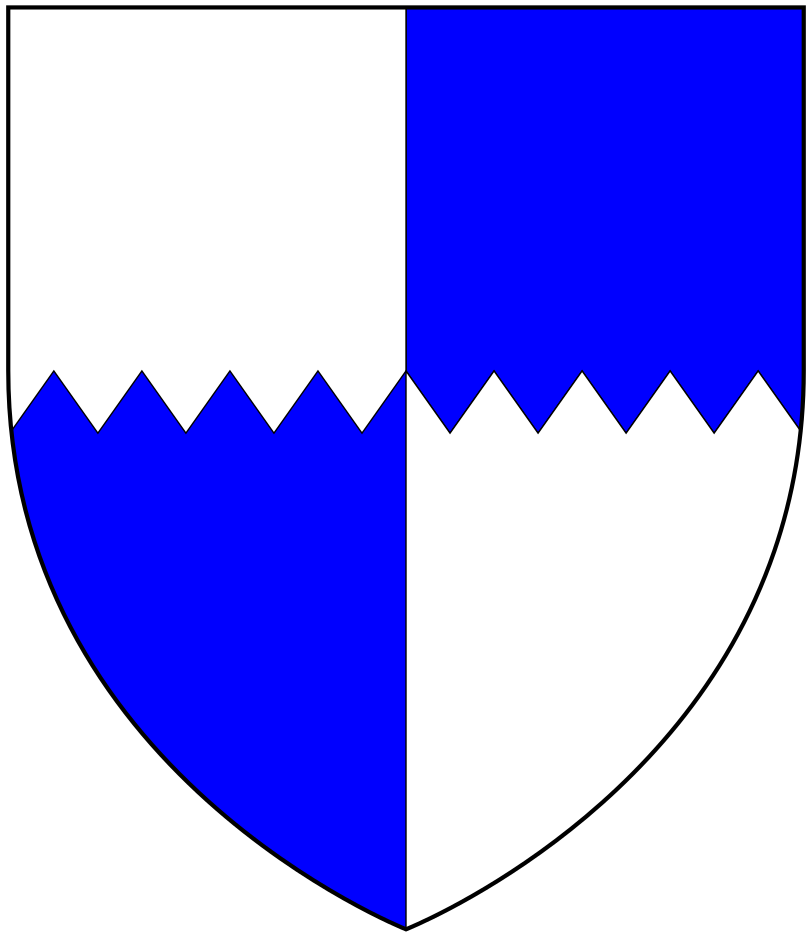
Arms of de Acton: Quarterly per fess indented argent and azure

The de Acton family long held the manor of Iron Acton, from which they took their surname. Their arms were: Quarterly per fess indented argent and azure. The arms of Reynold de Acton in the Collins Roll of Arms are blazoned as Quarterly per fess indented azure and ermine. The later descent of this family as recorded in the heraldic visitation of Gloucestershire is as follows:

- John de Acton
- Sir John de Acton (died 1312), son, who married a certain Helena, by whom he had one son and two daughters:
  - John de Acton (died 1314), son and heir, see below.
  - Johanna de Acton, wife of a certain Randolph
  - Matilda (or Maud) de Acton, who married (as his second wife) Nicholas Poyntz (died 1311), feudal baron of Curry Mallet in Somerset, by whom she had issue. She survived her husband and remarried to Roger Chandos, by whom she had a son Thomas Chandos.
- John de Acton (died 1314), son and heir, who married a certain Milicent.
- John de Acton (died 1362), son, who married a certain Johanna and died childless, following which his heir to Iron Acton became the descendant of his aunt Matilda (or Maud) de Acton, wife of Nicholas Poyntz (died 1311).

=== Poyntz ===
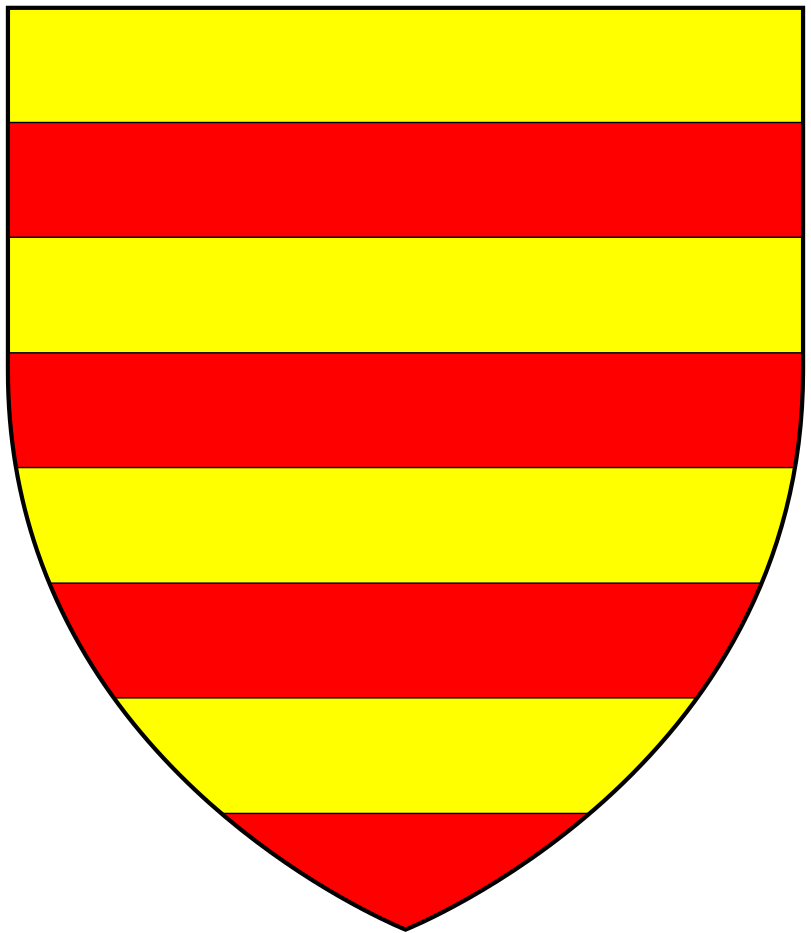
Arms of Poyntz: Barry of eight or and gules

==== John Poyntz (died 1376) ====
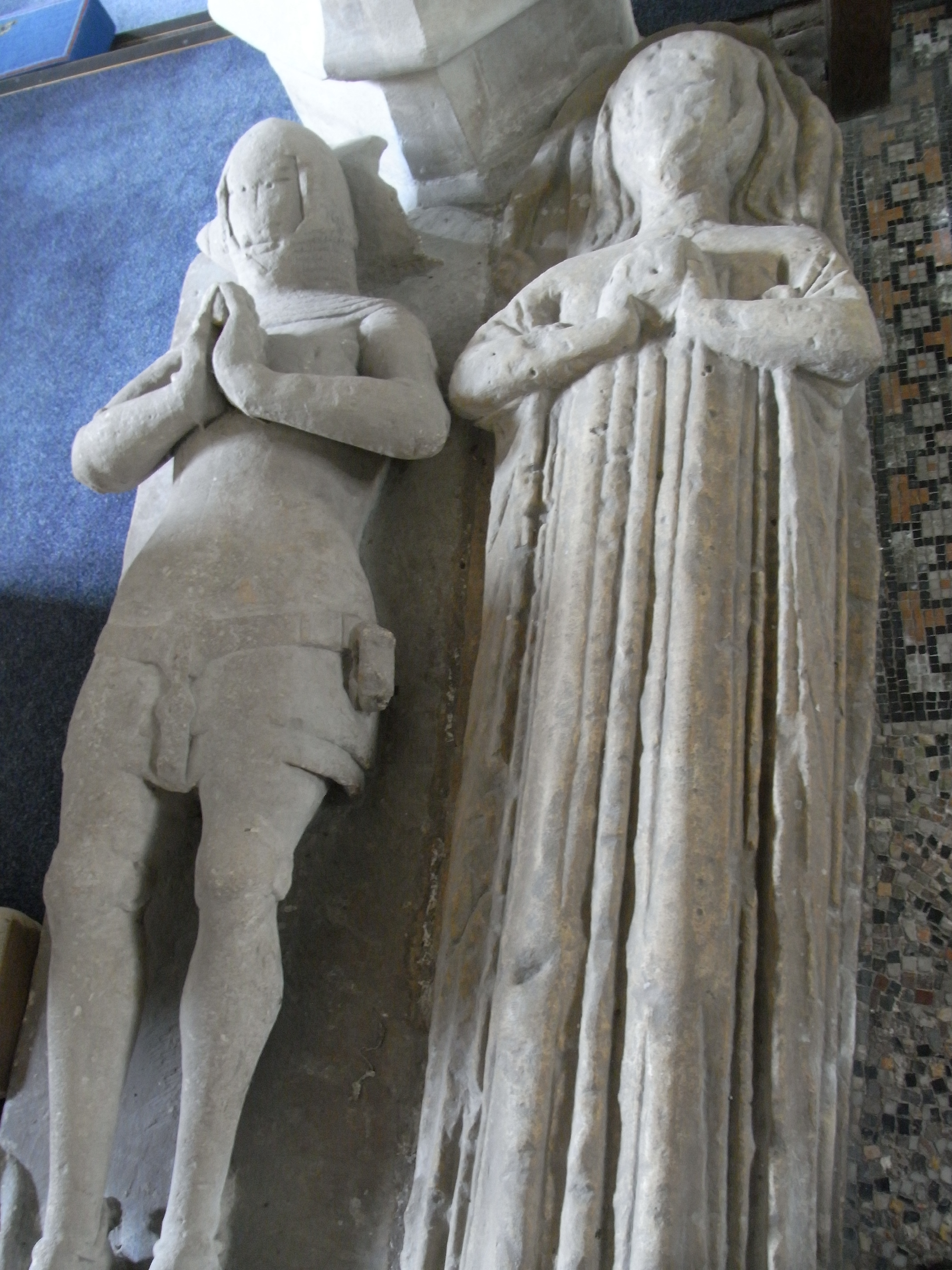
Effigies believed to represent Sir John Poyntz (died 1376), son of Matilda de Acton, and his wife Elizabeth Clanvowe (died 1372), daughter of Philip Clanvowe; right: Clanvowe arms: Paly of six or and azure, on a fess gules three mullets or, as quartered by Poyntz

John Poyntz (d. 24 Feb 1376), a younger son of Nicholas Poyntz (died 1311), feudal baron of Curry Mallet in Somerset, by his second wife Matilda (or Maud) de Acton, aunt and heiress in her issue of John de Acton (died 1362) of Iron Acton. he married twice:

- Firstly to Elizabeth Clanvowe, daughter of Philip Clanvowe and aunt and co-heiress of Sir Thomas Clanvowe (died 1410), Member of Parliament, by whom he had issue Robert Poyntz (died 1439), see below.
- Secondly to a certain Margaret, who survived him.

==== Robert Poyntz (1349–1439) ====
Drawing of tombstones of Sir Robert Poyntz (died 1439) and his 1st wife Anna. From Samuel Lysons' "Collection of Gloucestershire Antiquities", 1803

Preaching cross, Iron Acton churchyard, erected by Sir Robert Poyntz(died 1439). From Samuel Lysons' "Collection of Gloucestershire Antiquities", 1803

Robert Poyntz (1349–1439), son by his father's first marriage. He was MP for Gloucestershire in 1415 and 1417 and Sheriff of Gloucestershire 1396-7. He was steward between 1405–1416 of the estates of Anne of Gloucester (died 1438), dowager Countess of Stafford in Glos., Hants., and Wilts. and by 1439 was steward of the manor of her son Humphrey Stafford, 6th Earl of Stafford (died 1460) at Thornbury Castle. Robert's surviving ledger stone in Iron Acton Church depicts a knight, almost life-size, wearing a helmet with the body in plate armour with a skirt of traces. He wears a gorget with slight traces of chain-mail, round shoulder pieces, brassarts on the arms, gauntlets with pointed cuffs, legs in plate. His feet rest on a dog. The slab is much worn and was broken in two places in the 19th century. The ledger line contains the following inscription: Here lyeth Roberd poyntz Lord of Iren Acton and thys stepyl maked who deyde the fiftene day of Junne the year of oure Lord MCCCCXX...(last XIX worn away) of whos sowle God have mercy Amen. He built the steeple of Iron Acton Church, although the church lacks a steeple today, and none is shown in a 19th-century engraving of the church. The church tower itself appears to date from before the time of Robert, so surely cannot have been "the stepyl" referred to. It is however widely accepted that Robert erected the stone preaching cross in the church yard, which displays escutcheons bearing the arms of Acton and FitzNichol, the latter being the family of his second wife. The second slab is incised with the following words within a ledger line: Here lyeth Anne the firste wife of Roberd Poyntz of whos sowle God have mercy Amen. In the centre is shown a life-sized lady wearing a dress with tight-fitting body, low in the neck, laced from hands to waist with tight sleeves, full skirt and reticulated head-dress. The third slab retains only part of a female figure with a ledger line containing the words: ...erine the second wyfe of Robert Poyntz. The slab was re-incised with a Latin inscription to commemorate Elizabeth Poyntz(died 1631), wife of a much later Robert Poyntz.

He married twice:

- Firstly to a certain Anna, without children.
- Secondly to Catherine FitzNichol, a daughter and co-heiress of Sir Thomas FitzNichol of Hill, Gloucestershire, many times MP for Gloucestershire. She is said to have been murdered by one of her younger sons Maurice Poyntz, who was executed for matricide. By his second wife he left numerous children.

==== Nicholas Poyntz (died 1461) ====
Nicholas Poyntz (died 1461), son by his father's second wife. He married twice:

- Firstly to Elizabeth Mills, daughter of Sir Edward Mills of Horscomb, Gloucestershire, by whom he had children:
  - John Poyntz (died 1465/1472), eldest son and heir, see below.
  - Humphrey Poyntz (died 1487), of Langley, Yarnscombe, Devon, who married Elizabeth Pollard, of the Pollard family of Langley.
  - Elizabeth Poyntz, wife of John Carne.
- Secondly to Elizabeth Hussey, daughter of Henry Hussey of Sussex, by whom he had children:
  - Henry Poyntz, who founded the Poyntz family of Ockendon, Essex.
  - Alice Poyntz, wife of Maurice Denys (c. 1410 – 1466), Esquire, of Siston, Gloucestershire, twice Sheriff of Gloucestershire in 1460 and 1461.
  - Elizabeth Poyntz, a nun at Shaftesbury Abbey
  - Joanne Poyntz, wife of William Dodington
  - Margaret Poyntz, wife of John Lisley of Sussex.

==== John Poyntz (died 1465/1472) ====
John Poyntz (died 1465/1472), eldest son and heir by his father's first wife. He married Alicia Cocks, of Bristol, who survived him and remarried to Sir Edward Berkeley of Beverstone castle. By his wife he had children:

- Robert Poyntz (died 1520), eldest son and heir, see below
- Thomas Poyntz (died 1501), second son, an Esquire of the Body at the baptism of Prince Arthur, first-born son of King Henry VII. He married the widow of Lord Ferrers of Chartley.
- Maurice Poyntz, third son
- Anne Poyntz
- Elizabeth Poyntz

==== Sir Robert Poyntz (died 1520) ====
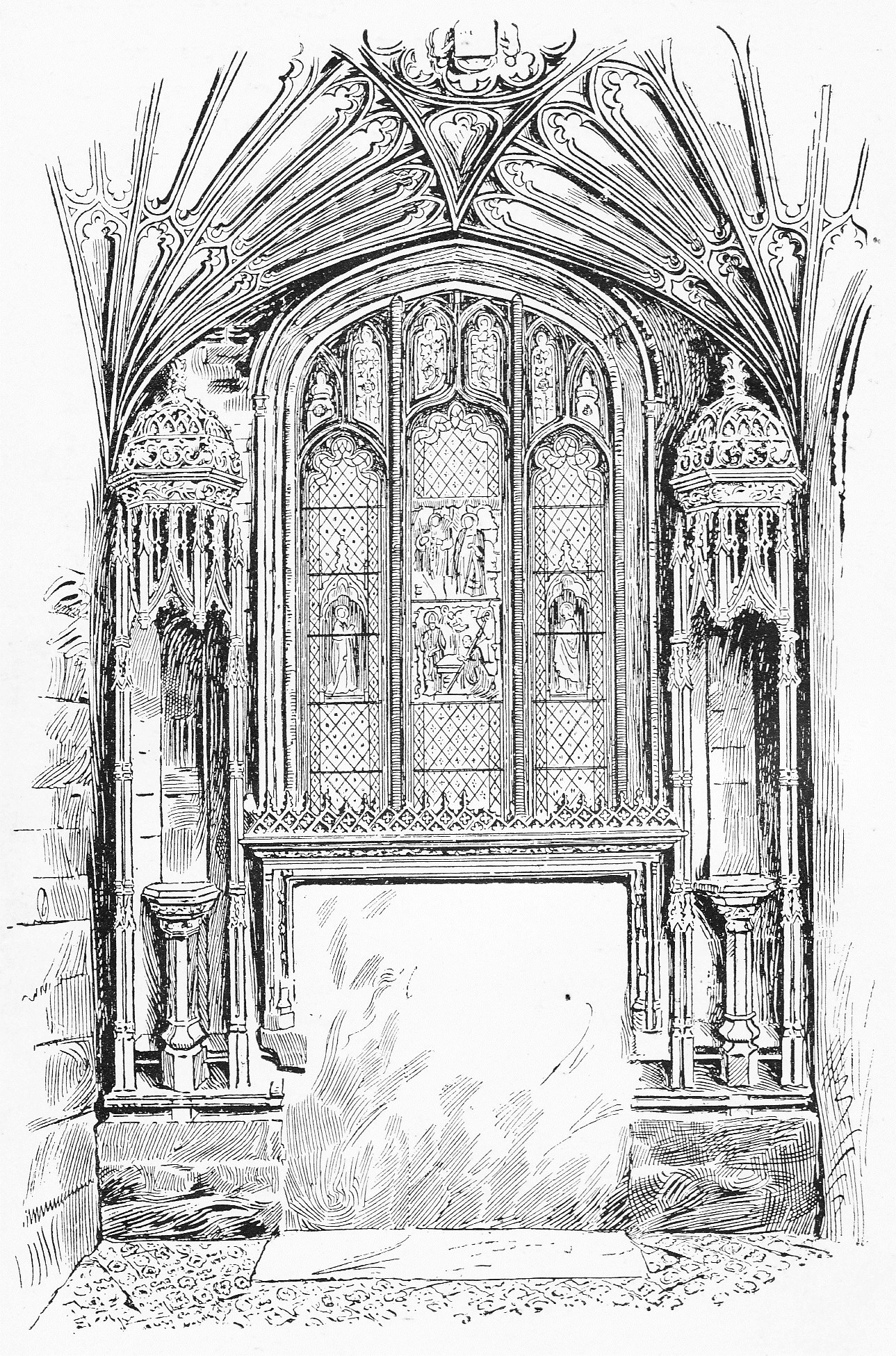
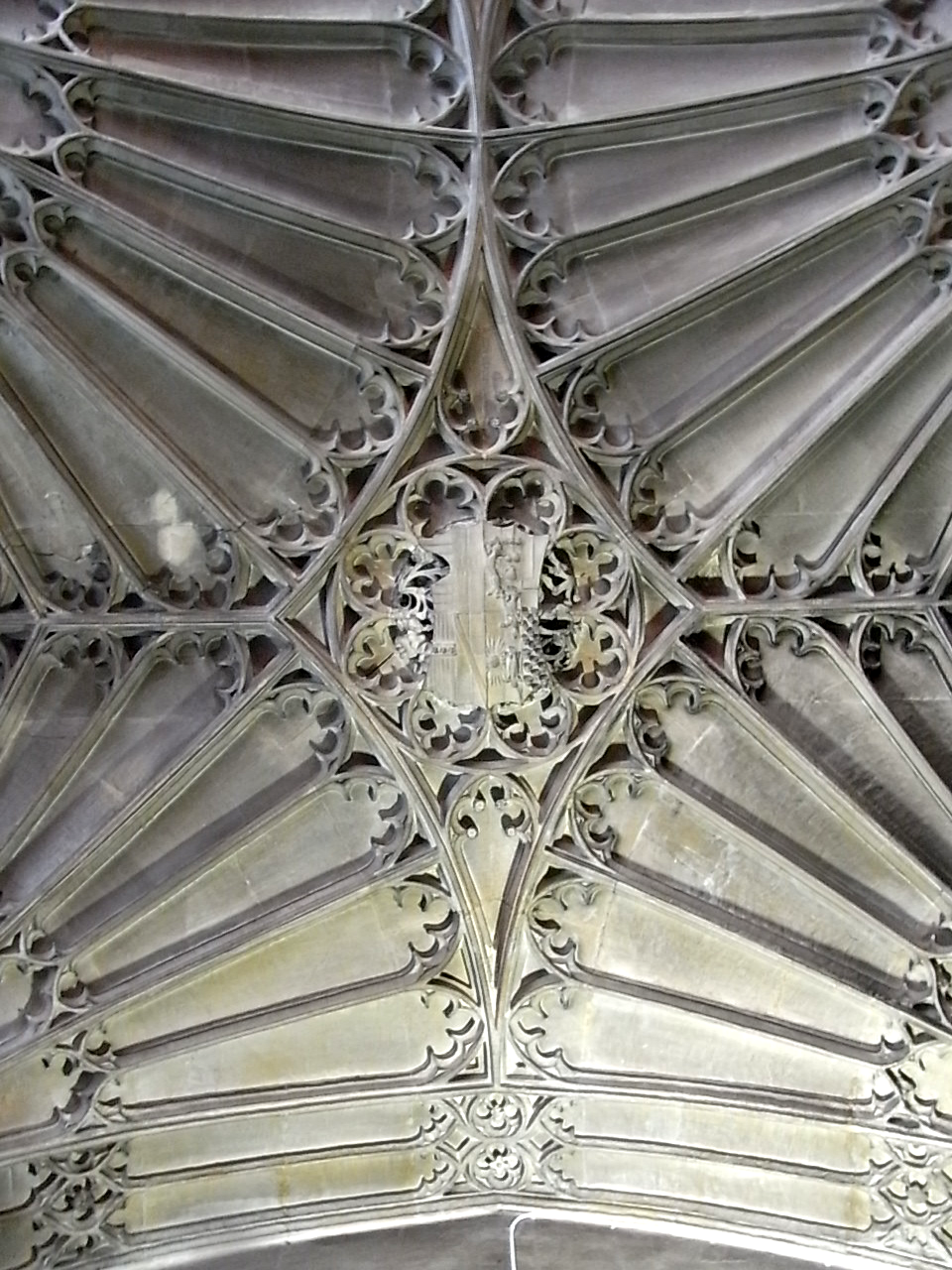
Poyntz Chapel in the Gaunt's Chapel, Bristol, built by Sir Robert Poyntz (died 1520); left: view towards east end formerly occupied by an altar, with Spanish floor-tiles; right: the fan-vaulted ceiling with Poyntz arms impaling Woodville in centre

Sir Robert Poyntz (died 1520), eldest son and heir, a supporter of the future King Henry VII at the Battle of Bosworth in 1485. He was buried in the Gaunt's Chapel, Bristol, in the magnificent "Chapel of Jesus" (known as the "Poyntz Chapel"), a chantry chapel built by him. He married Margaret Woodville, the illegitimate daughter and only child of Anthony Woodville, 2nd Earl Rivers (c. 1440-1483), Knight of the Garter (brother of Queen Elizabeth Woodville who married King Edward IV), by his mistress Gwenlina Stradling, daughter of William Stradling of St Donat's Castle, Glamorgan. By Margaret Woodville he had five sons and four daughters including:

- Sir Anthony Poyntz (c. 1480 – 1533), eldest son and heir, see below.
- John Poyntz (c. 1485 – 1544), of Alderley, Gloucestershire, second son, MP for Devizes in 1529, whose portrait by Hans Holbein the Younger survives in the Royal Collection at Windsor Castle.

==== Sir Anthony Poyntz (c. 1480 – 1533) ====
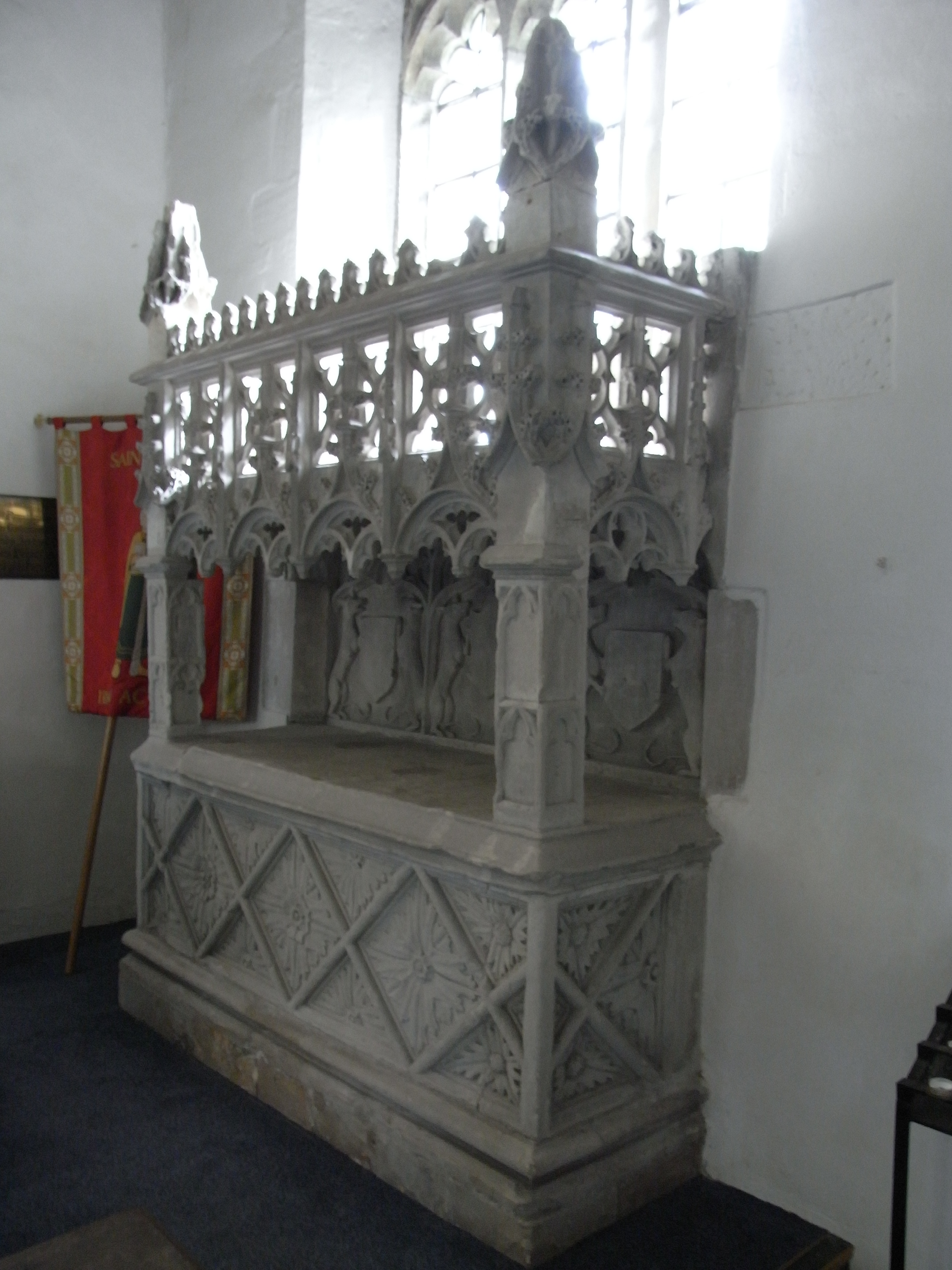
Early 16th century Easter Sepulchre monument against south wall of the Poyntz Chapel, Iron Acton Church, possibly of Sir Anthony Poyntz (c. 1480 – 1533). Three heraldic escutcheons appear, one showing the de Acton arms, the other two now blank. No inscription survives

Sir Anthony Poyntz (c. 1480 – 1533), eldest son and heir, a diplomat and naval commander. He married twice:

- Firstly to Elizabeth Huddesfield, daughter of Sir William Huddesfield (died 1499), of Shillingford St George, Devon, Attorney-General to King Edward IV. By Elizabeth he had children including:
  - Sir Nicholas Poyntz (died 1556), eldest son and heir, see below.
- Secondly to Joan, widow of Sir Richard Guilford.

==== Sir Nicholas Poyntz (1510–1556) ====
Sir Nicholas Poyntz (1510–1556), eldest son and heir by his father's first wife. He was a prominent courtier during the latter part of the reign of King Henry VIII. His portrait drawing by Hans Holbein the Younger survives in the Royal Collection. He added the east wing to the moated manor house of Acton Court, which addition was lavishly decorated to impress King Henry VIII, who with his second wife, Anne Boleyn, visited the house in 1535 during a tour of the West Country. He married Joan Berkeley, daughter of Thomas Berkeley, 5th Baron Berkeley (died 1533), of Berkeley Castle, Gloucestershire, by whom he had five or six sons and three daughters, including his eldest son and heir Nicholas Poyntz (c. 1528 – 1585).

==== Nicholas Poyntz (c. 1528 – 1585) ====
Sir Nicholas Poyntz (c. 1528 – 1585), eldest son and heir. He was a Member of Parliament for Totnes, Devon, in 1559 and for Gloucestershire in 1571. He was knighted in 1559 and was appointed Sheriff of Gloucestershire for 1569-70. He married twice:

- Firstly to Anne Verney, daughter of Sir Ralph Verney of Penley, Hertfordshire, by whom he had a son and heir John Poyntz (died 1633) and two daughters.
- Secondly to Margaret Stanley, daughter of Edward Stanley, 3rd Earl of Derby, and widow of John Jermyn of Rushbrooke, Suffolk, by whom he had a further three sons.

==== Sir John Poyntz (died 1633) ====
Sir John Poyntz (died 1633), eldest son and heir. He was Sheriff of Gloucestershire in 1591 and was knighted before 1593. He was elected Member of Parliament for Gloucestershire in 1593. He died insolvent and intestate in 1633 and was buried at Iron Acton. He married four times:

- Firstly to Ursula Sydenham, daughter of John Sydenham of Brampton, Somerset,
- Secondly to Elizabeth Sydenham daughter and heiress of Alexander Sydenham of Luxborough in Somerset, by whom he had children:
  - Robert Poyntz (died 1666), son and heir, see below
  - Elizabeth Poyntz, wife of Thomas Butler, Viscount Thurles (c. 1596 – 1619), the son and heir apparent of Walter Butler, 11th Earl of Ormond, whom he predeceased. He lived at Thurles Castle, County Tipperary, Ireland. Her eldest son was James Butler, 1st Duke of Ormonde.
  - Dorothy Poyntz, wife of John Gifford of Whiteladies in Staffordshire.

==== Sir Robert Poyntz (died 1666) ====
Sir Robert Poyntz (died 1666), KB, son and heir. He was the last Poyntz of Iron Acton. He was appointed Knight of the Order of the Bath on 2 February 1626, at the coronation of Charles I. In 1626 he was elected Knight of the Shire for Gloucestershire and was re-elected in 1628 and sat until 1629 when King Charles I decided to rule without parliament for eleven years. He was High Sheriff of Gloucestershire in 1637. He married Francisca Gibbons, a daughter and co-heiress of Geruatus Gibbons of Kent, by whom he left no male children, only two daughters:

- Grissel Poyntz, who married Richard Porter
- Margareta Poyntz, who married firstly Sir Richard Hastings and secondly Samuel Gorges.

== Sources ==
- Maclean, Sir John; Heane, W.C., eds. (1885). The Visitation of the County of Gloucester, taken in the year 1623, by Henry Chitty and John Phillipot as deputies to William Camden, Clarenceux King of Arms; with pedigrees from the heralds’ visitation of 1569 and 1582-3, and sundry miscellaneous pedigrees. Harleian Society, 1st ser. 21. London, pp. 128–135, pedigree of Poyntz
- Thompson, H.L., The Poyntz Family, Transactions of the Bristol and Gloucestershire Archaeological Society, 1879–80, Vol. 4, pp.73–85
