= Nicholas Poyntz (disambiguation) =

Nicholas Poyntz (died 1557) was a courtier, MP for Gloucestershire, 1547 and Cricklade, 1555.

Nicholas Poyntz may also refer to:

- Nicholas Poyntz (MP died 1430), MP for Gloucestershire
- Nicholas Poyntz (MP died 1585) (1520s–1585), MP for Totnes, 1559 and for Gloucestershire, 1571
