= John Guildford (died 1493) =

Member of the Parliament of England

Sir John Guildford

High Sheriff of Kent
- In office 1457–1457
- Preceded by: Alexander Iden
- Succeeded by: Gervase Clifton

Personal details
- Born: 1420s Kent, England
- Died: 1493 Kent, England

Sir John Guildford (died 1493), was an English landowner, administrator and politician from Kent.

== Origins ==
Born about 1425, he was the son and heir of Edward Guildford (died 1449) and his first wife Juliana Pittlesden, daughter of Stephen Pittlesden. His paternal grandparents were William Guildford (died 1394) and his wife Joan Halden.

== Career ==
From 1454 onwards he was appointed to various royal commissions for his county, in 1457 served as High Sheriff of Kent, and in 1460 was named as a justice of the peace. In 1461 he was one of the notables of Kent ordered to raise forces against the army of Queen Margaret and was awarded an annual pension of 26 pounds. By 1470 he had been knighted and in 1483 he and his son Richard joined the rebellion led by Henry Stafford, 2nd Duke of Buckingham against the rule of King Richard III. While his son escaped to join Henry Tudor in Brittany, he was captured, imprisoned in Newgate, attainted for treason, and then released. When Henry overthrew the regime of Richard in 1485, the attainder was reversed, his possessions were restored, and he was elected Member of Parliament for Kent. In 1487 he was appointed to the Privy Council, being granted lands forfeited by the Staffords together with royal licence to empark about 800 hectares in Rolvenden and Cranbrook, as well licence to crenellate his manor of Halden in the parish of Rolvenden that was inherited from his grandmother in addition to other properties at Tenterden and Cranbrook.

He died on 19 July 1493. His will dated 20 March 1492, in which he asked to be buried at Tenterden, was proved on 25 August 1493.

== Family ==
In about 1448, he married Alice Waller, daughter of Sir Richard Waller and his wife Silvia Gulby. Since sources differ on their children and their marriages, a provisional list is:

- Sir Richard Guildford, who married first Anne Pympe and secondly Joan Vaux.
- Elizabeth Guildford, who married Henry Aucher, of Lossenham in Newenden.
- Thomasine Guildford, who married John Engham, of Great Chart.
- Bennet Guildford, who married (1) James Isaac, (2) Lewin Clifford, and (3) an untraced husband whose last name was Boys, from Sevington.
- Juliana Guildford, who married William Warner, of Sheppey.
- Joan Guildford, who married John Isaac, of Sevington.

In about 1473, he married Philippa Thornbury, widow of John Pympe (died 1454), and of William Tyrell (died about 1471), who was the daughter of John Thornbury and his wife Anne Thorleigh.

His third wife, who survived him, was named Elizabeth.

== See also ==
- Guldeford baronets
