= Robert Poyntz (died 1520) =

Lord of the manor of Iron Acton in Gloucestershire

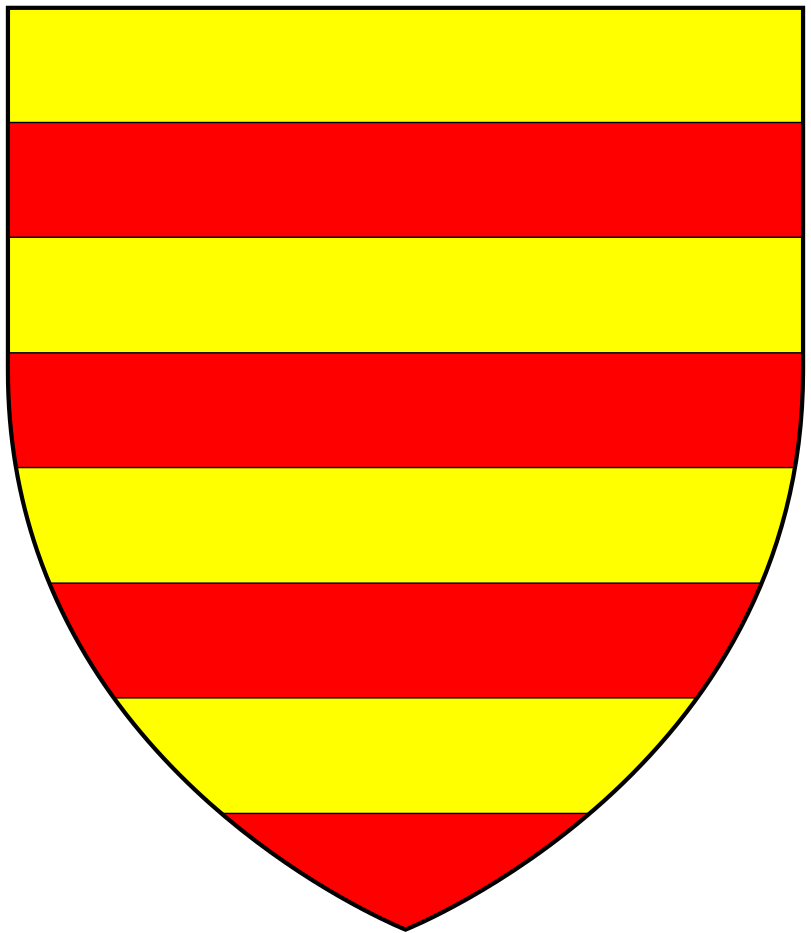
Arms of Poyntz: Barry of eight or and gules

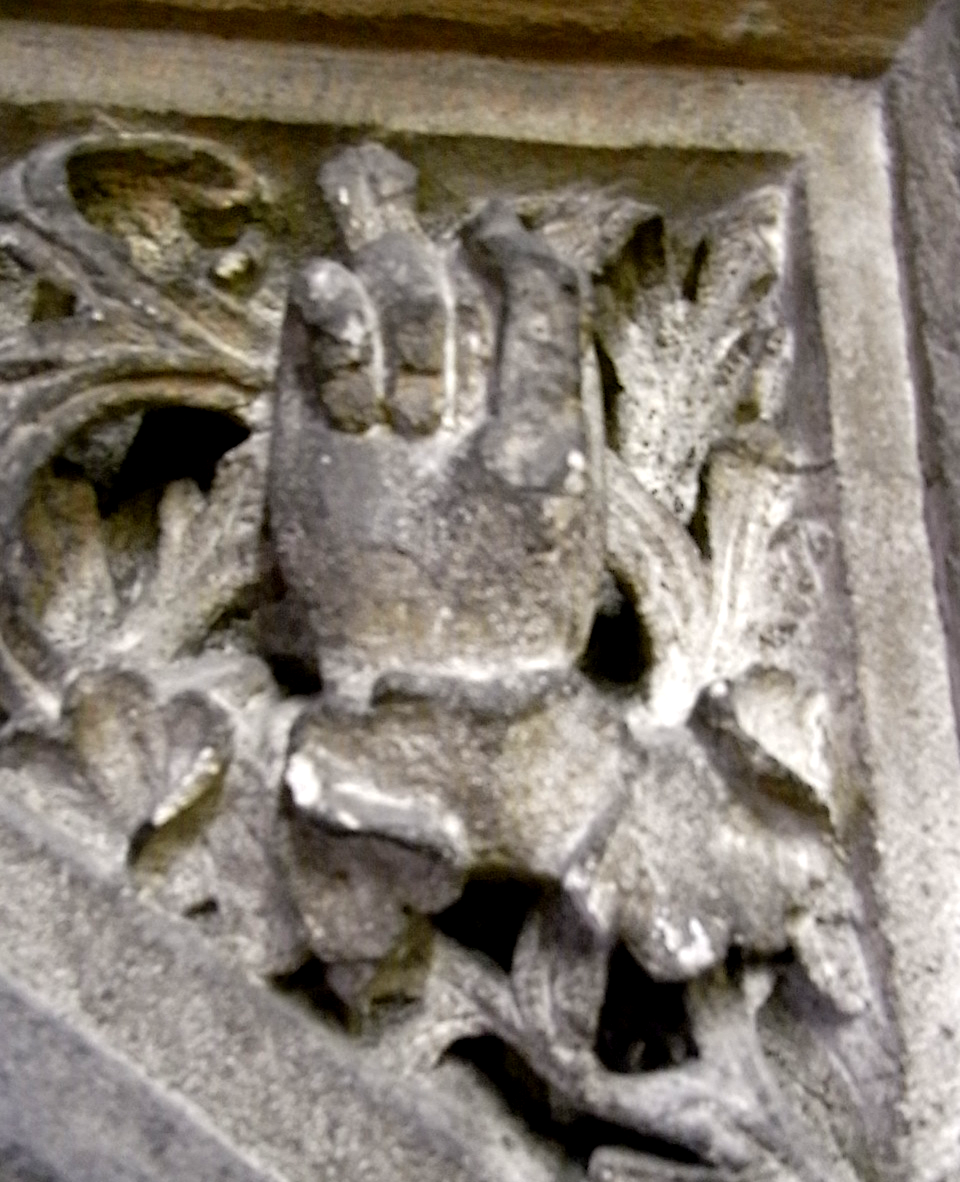
canting crest of Poyntz: A hand clenched, from the French poigne, "fist". Sculpted in spandrel above entrance door to the Poyntz Chapel built by Sir Robert Poyntz in the Gaunt's Chapel, Bristol

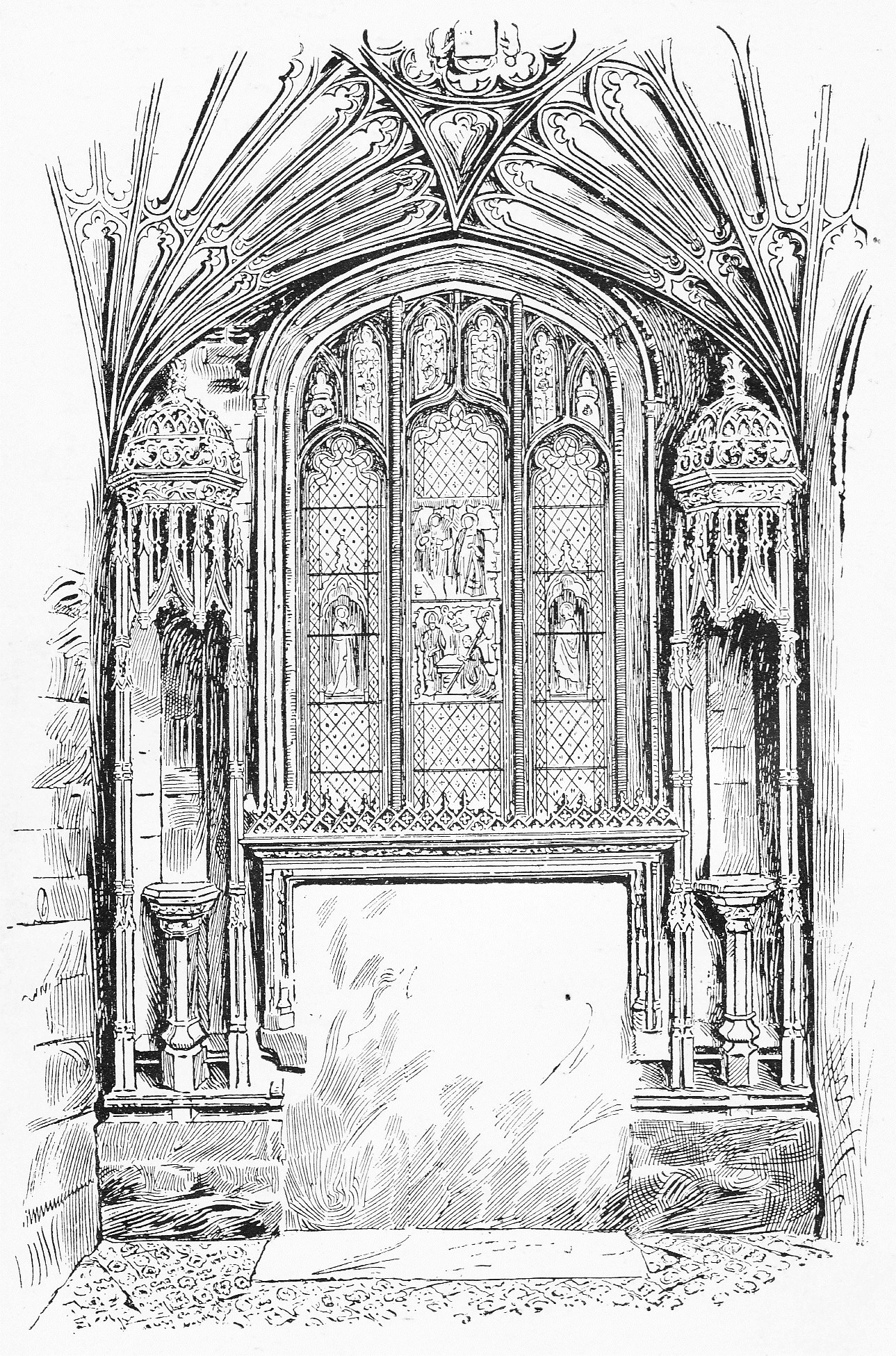
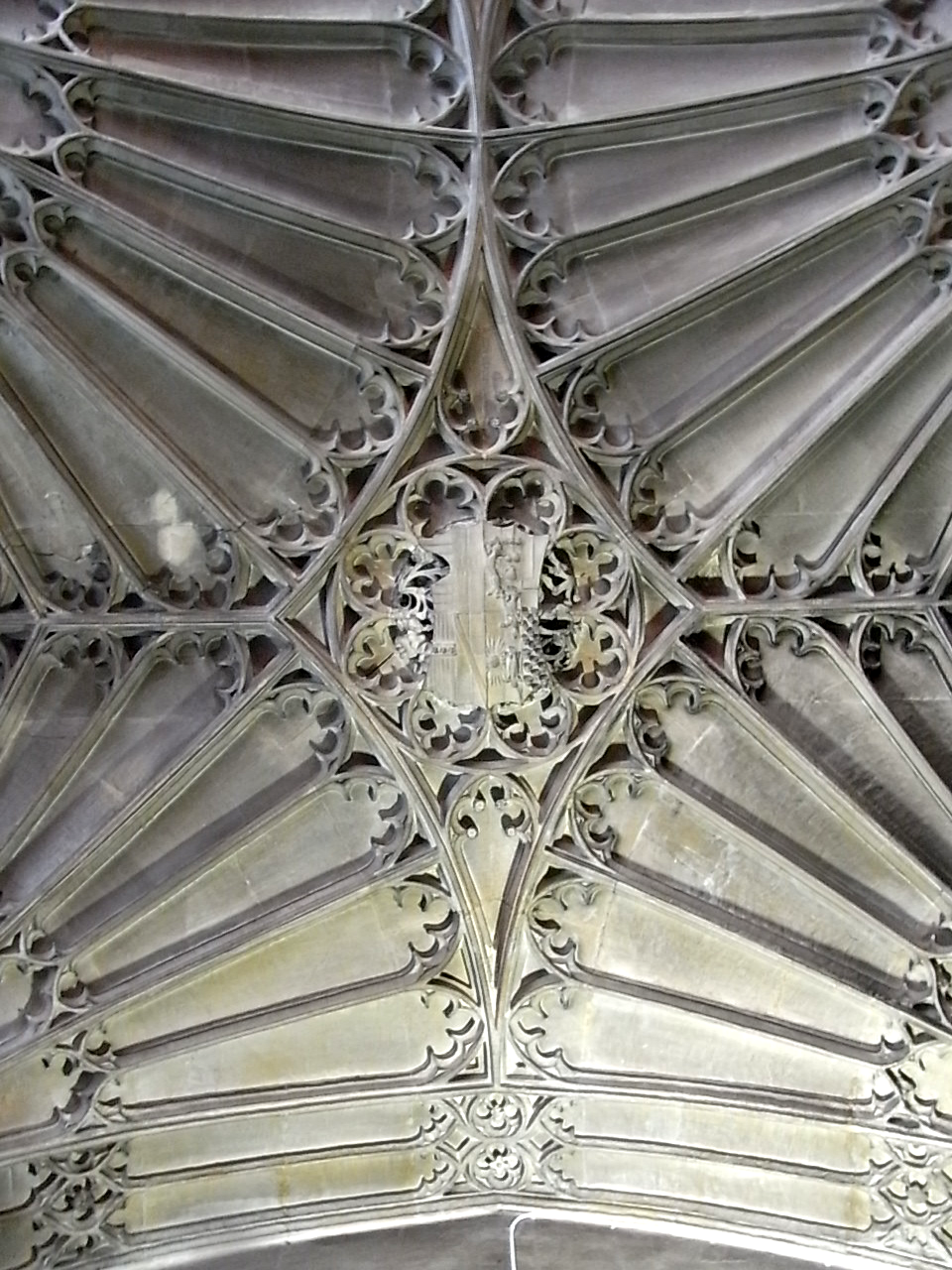
Poyntz Chapel in the Gaunt's Chapel, Bristol, built by Sir Robert Poyntz (died 1520); left: view towards east end formerly occupied by an altar, with Spanish floor-tiles; right: the fan-vaulted ceiling with Poyntz arms impaling Woodville in centre

Sir Robert Poyntz (died 1520), lord of the manor of Iron Acton in Gloucestershire, was a supporter of the future King Henry VII at the Battle of Bosworth in 1485. He was buried in the Gaunt's Chapel, Bristol, in the magnificent "Chapel of Jesus" (known as the "Poyntz Chapel"), a chantry chapel built by him.

== Origins ==
He was the eldest son and heir of John Poyntz (died 1465/72), of Iron Acton, by his wife Alicia Cocks of Bristol, who survived him and remarried to Sir Edward Berkeley of Beverstone Castle in Gloucestershire. Sir Robert's younger brother was Thomas Poyntz (died 1501), an Esquire of the Body of King Henry VII at the baptism of his first-born son Prince Arthur, who married a certain Jane, the second wife and widow of Walter Devereux, 8th Baron Ferrers of Chartley(c.1432–1485), Knight of the Garter.

=== Early origins ===
The Poyntz family of Iron Acton were descended from John Poyntz (d.1376), a younger son of Nicholas Poyntz (d.1311), feudal baron of Curry Mallet in Somerset, by his second wife Matilda (or Maud) de Acton, aunt and heiress in her issue of John de Acton (died 1362) of Iron Acton.

== Marriage and children ==
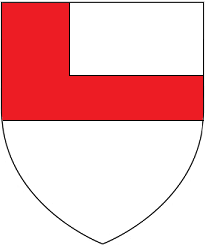
Arms of Woodville: Argent, a fesse and a canton conjoined gules

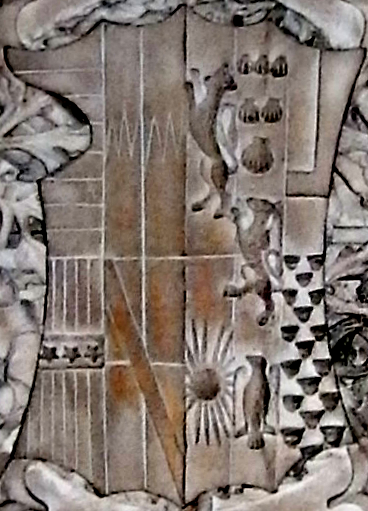
Shield forming ceiling boss of the Poyntz Chapel, showing the arms of Poyntz (of 4 quarters, 1:Poyntz; 2:de Acton; 3:Clanvowe; 4:FitzNichol) impaling the arms of Woodville (of 6 quarters, 3rd quarter Woodville)

He married Margaret Woodville, the illegitimate daughter and only child of Anthony Woodville, 2nd Earl Rivers (c. 1440–1483), Knight of the Garter (brother of Queen Elizabeth Woodville who married King Edward IV), by his mistress Gwenlina Stradling, a daughter of William Stradling of St Donat's Castle in Glamorgan, Wales. The Heraldic Visitation of Gloucestershire records that:

"A testimony of this match apereth by indenture of covenant of the mariag yett extant under the hand and seale of the said Erle, by letters written by the hand of the reverend ffather Morton, Cardinall, also by the armes of the Erle impaled w(i)th Poyntz on the top of a Chappell near Bristowe where they lye buried".

By his wife he had five sons and four daughters including:

- Sir Anthony Poyntz (c. 1480 – 1533) of Iron Acton, eldest son and heir;
- John Poyntz (c. 1485 – 1544), of Alderley, Gloucestershire, second son, a Member of Parliament for Devizes, Wiltshire, in 1529, whose portrait by Hans Holbein the Younger survives in the Royal Collection at Windsor Castle.
- Sir Francis Poyntz (d. 1528), a diplomat who travelled to Spain and France in 1527, third son, of Madeley Castle. In 1526 he was granted custody of the manor of Holborn during the minority of Edward Stanley, 3rd Earl of Derby, and in the same year he received some of the forfeited lands of Edward Stafford, 3rd Duke of Buckingham, of which Madeley was part. He married Jane or Joan, a daughter of Sir Matthew Browne of Betchworth, but left no issue. At the request of his brother Anthony, he wrote The Table of Cebes the Philosopher, Translated out of Latine into Englishe by Sir Francis Poyngs, which was published by Berthelet probably about 1530; a copy is in the British Library. He died of the plague in London on 25 June 1528.
- Lady Anne Walsh (nee Poyntz) (c. 1492 – 1528), the wife of Lord John Walsh, who was a close associate of King Henry VIII and the Sheriff of Gloucester. The Walshes employed future Protestant martyr and bible translator William Tyndale as a tutor for their sons.
- Elizabeth married Nicholas Wykes.

== Builds Poyntz Chapel ==
In about 1520, at the end of his life, he built a fine chantry chapel as an addition to the Gaunt's Chapel in Bristol (today known as St Mark's Church, Bristol), to the east end of the south aisle, beyond the tower, known as the "Chapel of Jesus" or "Poyntz Chapel". It should be distinguished from the Poyntz manorial chapel in Iron Acton Church, the family's chapel as lords of the manor and patrons of the advowson. It is fan-vaulted, and has two niches of unknown use on the North wall. The floor is covered with coloured Spanish tiles, probably from Seville and contemporaneous with the building. The center boss of the vaulted ceiling comprises a shield displaying the arms of Poyntz impaling Woodville, representing his marriage. At the entrance to the chapel is sculpted in stone the canting crest of Poyntz, A hand clenched, from the French poigne, "fist".

== Death and burial ==
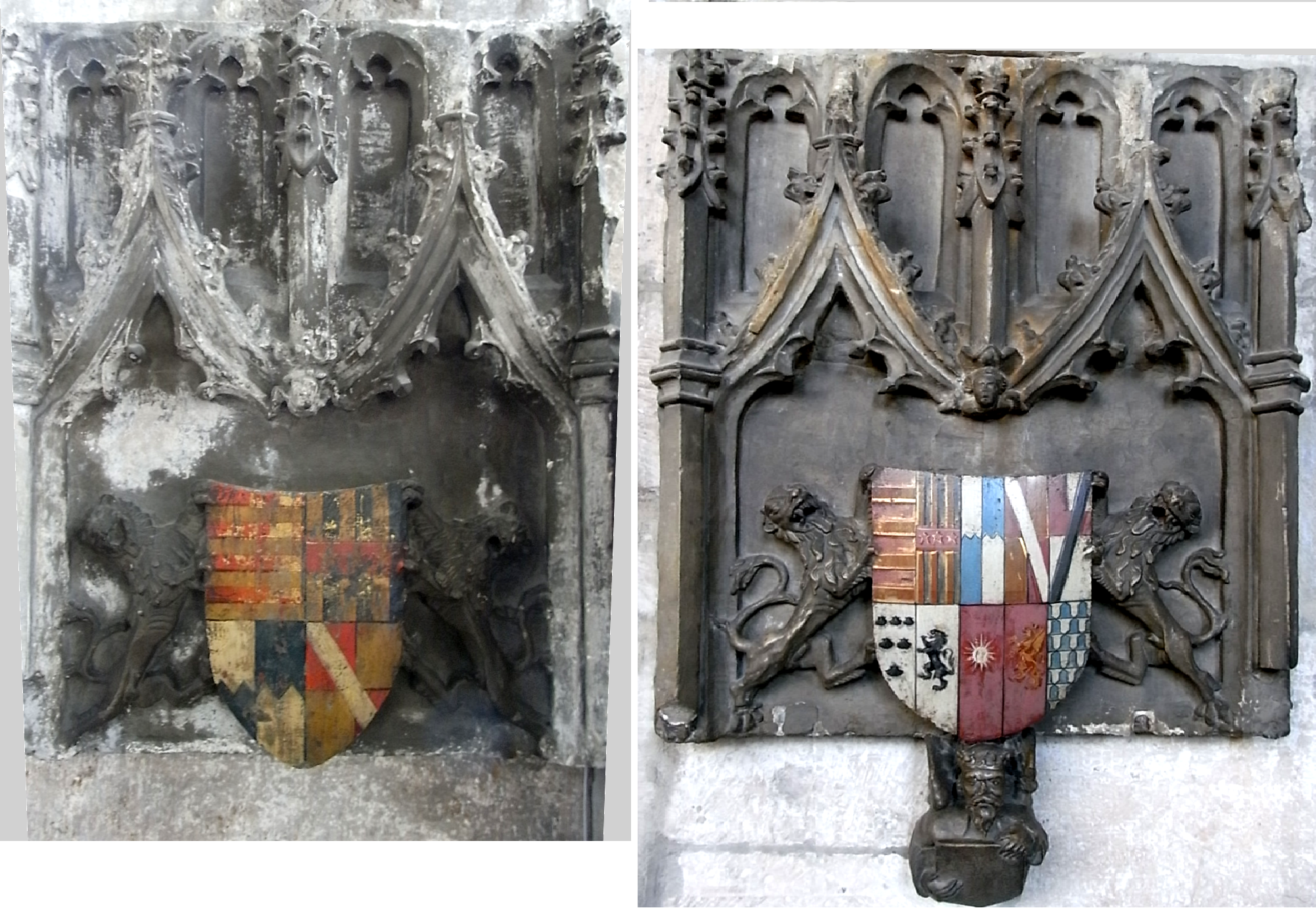
Remnants of chest-tomb of Sir Robert Poyntz (d.1520) in the Gaunt's Chapel, Bristol, showing heraldry of Poyntz and Woodville

He died in 1520 and was buried in the Gaunt's Chapel in Bristol (today known as St Mark's Church, Bristol), in which he had built the Poyntz Chapel, his chantry chapel. Two remnants of his chest-tomb survive in the Gaunt's Chapel, being wooden panels decorated with Gothic canopy-work, each showing an heraldic shield. One shows the arms of Poyntz of four quarters ( 1:Poyntz; 2:de Acton; 3:Clanvowe; 4:FitzNichol); the other shows the same first four quarters with an additional six quarters of the Woodville family, thus being the shield of the couple's son. The 5th quarter is Woodville with baton sinister for bastardy.
