= Halden, Rolvenden =

Manor house

Coordinates: 51°04′22″N 0°38′23″E

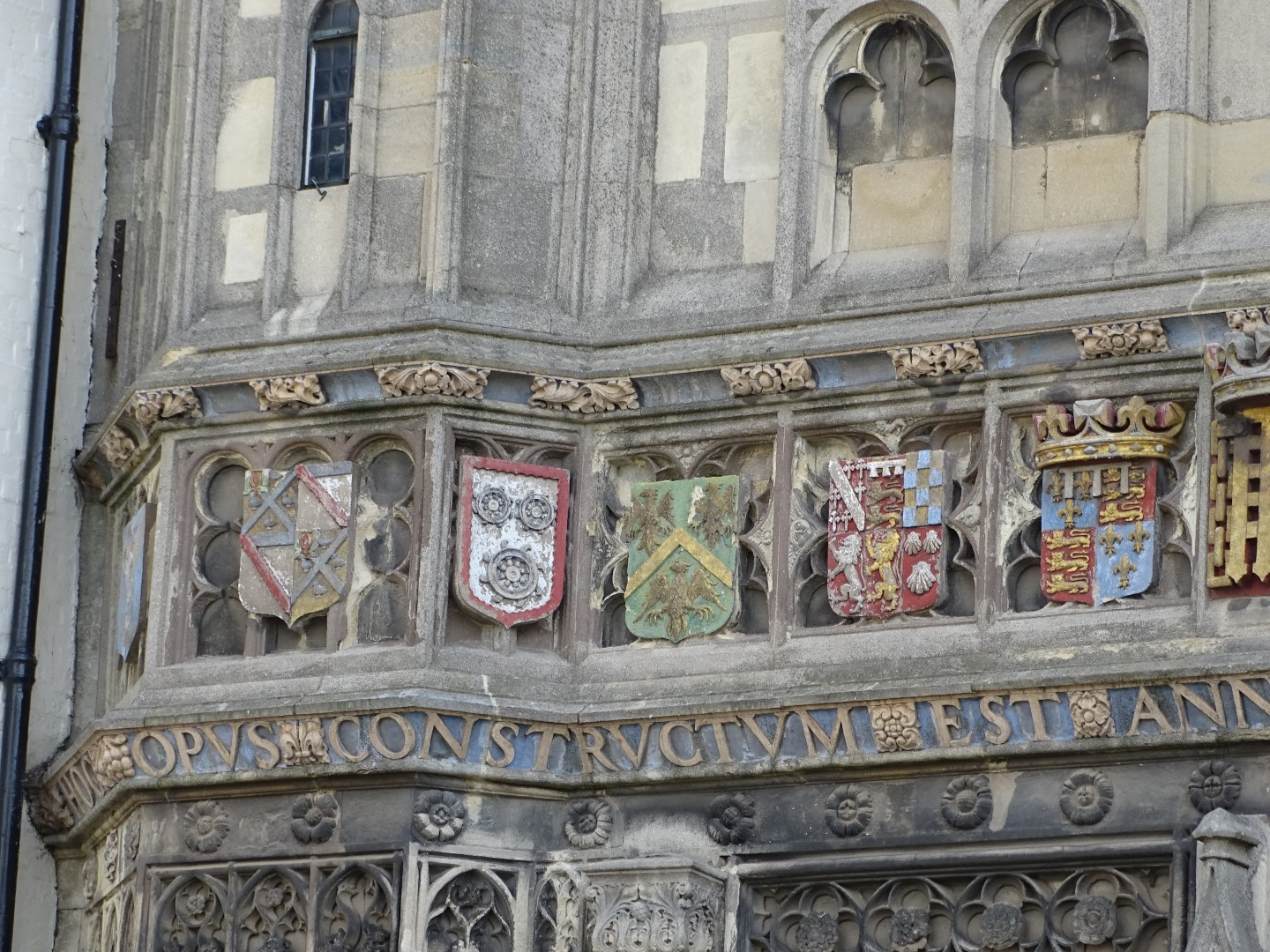
Christchurch Gate, Canterbury Cathedral, Kent, far left: Quarterly of 4: 1&4: Or, a saltire between four martlets sable (Guldeford); 2&3: Argent, a chief sable overall a bend engrailed gules (de Halden)

Halden is an historic manor in the parish of Rolvenden in Kent, England. The manor house was later known as Halden Place and is a Grade II listed building. It was the seat of the de Halden family until the death of John Halden without male progeny when his daughter and heiress brought it to the Guldeford (or Guildford, etc.), a member of whom she had married. Her grandson Sir John Guildford (1420–1493) (alias Guilford, Guldeford, etc.) of Halden was Comptroller of the Household to King Edward IV. On 6 October 1487 he obtained royal licence to crenellate his house at Halden, together with other of his residences. The arms of Guldeford quartering de Halden survive on the Christchurch Gate of Canterbury Cathedral, built in 1517. Lady Jane Grey (c. 1537-1554), "the Nine Days' Queen", lived at Halden Place. Today the remains of Halden Place comprise a large farmhouse situated about a mile and a quarter north of Rolvenden Church. The arms of Guldeford survive sculpted in stone on the stable-block.
