= Edward Guildford (MP for Kent) =

Member of the Parliament of England

Edward Guildford (c1390-1449) was an English landowner, administrator, and politician from the county of Kent who served three times as its MP and once as its Sheriff.

== Career ==
Born about 1390, he was the son and heir of William Guildford, a landowner and politician who lived at the manor of Hemsted in the parish of Benenden, and his wife Joan Halden, heiress of the manor of Halden in Rolvenden.

His father having died when he was young, how he was brought up and how his inheritance was kept secure are unknown. By the time he reached majority, however, he was in trouble with the law. In 1412 he was bound over in the sum of 200 pounds to King Henry IV to ensure that he would do no harm to Patrick St Owen. In 1413 the Sheriff of Kent was ordered to arrest him and eight others and to bring them immediately before the Court of Chancery. In or after 1416 complaint was made to the Lord Chancellor alleging that he had forcibly deprived John Hicks of his property in Rolvenden, dragging him out of his house by his legs, and stealing goods worth 20 pounds. The injured man claimed that it was impossible to get justice in the local Kent courts.

Despite this record of offences, in 1419 he received his first public appointment, to a royal commission of array in Kent, and in that year was elected MP for Kent. In 1420, shortly after the dissolution of his first Parliament, his name was included by the local JPs in a list sent to the Privy Council as one of the dozen men from the county they considered most capable of doing military service in defence of the kingdom (though there is no record of him serving as a soldier). Later that year he attended the parliamentary elections held at Rochester and, in 1421, those held at Canterbury.

Having entered national politics, his circle of acquaintance widened. He became an associate of the Surrey MP Nicholas Carew, for whom he witnessed deeds in 1421 and 1432, and also acted as a trustee of his estates. In 1426 he served as royal escheator for the counties of Kent and Middlesex and for a second time was elected MP for Kent. In 1428 he had dealings with the Privy Councillor Sir Walter Hungerford over the manor of Eythorne, of which the manor of Elmton that he had acquired was a dependency. However his most important connection was with King Henry VI's governess Alice Beauchamp, widow of the MP Sir Thomas Boteler of Sudeley and of the MP Sir John Dallingridge of Bodiam. While acting in the 1430s as a trustee of her substantial estates in Sussex and Kent, he would have been in contact with his two co-trustees, Richard Beauchamp, 13th Earl of Warwick and Humphrey Stafford, 6th Earl of Stafford.

In 1431 he was involved in transactions regarding land in Stone on behalf of William Bertin of Canterbury, who had married his daughter Elizabeth, and that year was appointed Sheriff of Kent. In 1434 he was among Kent gentry required to take an oath not to maintain malefactors and he served on two royal commissions of inquiry, one into a Kent manor and the other into theft of a ship's cargo. In 1435 he sat for the third time as MP for Kent, was on a commission of array, and for the first time was appointed a JP for the county. In 1436 the Privy Council asked him to loan 40 pounds towards the Duke of York's military expedition to France and he served on two royal commissions, one on distributing tax allowances in Kent and one on the defence of Sussex.

After re-appointment as a JP for Kent in 1437, he was added to the commission of oyer and terminer in 1438 and chosen as sheriff. followed in 1439 by a commission on defences in Sussex. In 1440 he and his wife joined the religious fraternity of Christ Church Priory in Canterbury and he was appointed a third time to the bench of magistrates, sitting for life. That year he was on a commission to raise royal loans in Kent, followed by other commissions in 1441 and 1443. In that year he began legal proceedings against members of the Brenchley family for possession of a holding in Benenden, eventually ending the disagreement with a settlement out of court. Not long afterwards it was alleged in the Court of Chancery that he had refused to return the manor of Dane Court near Eythorne to its rightful owner.

In 1444 he founded a chapel in Rolvenden church in honour of St Anne and St Katherine and in his will, made on 16 October 1448, asked to be buried there. Probate was on 21 September 1449, his executors including his son John and his son-in-law, William Darell. His widow was alive in December 1455, when she acted as advowee of Eythorne rectory. According to the Visitation of Kent in 1619, his first wife had predeceased him and it was a second wife with the same first name, Juliana Markle, who survived him.

== Family ==
At an early age he married Juliana Pittlesden or Picklesden (sources differ), who probably came from Tenterden, and they had five known children:

John Guildford, his heir, later knighted.
Anne Guildford, who married William Darell MP.
Elizabeth Guildford, who married William Bertin.
Alice Guildford, who married Richard Haute.
Thomasine Guildford, who married John Bamborough.
