= Eva Dorothy Brown =

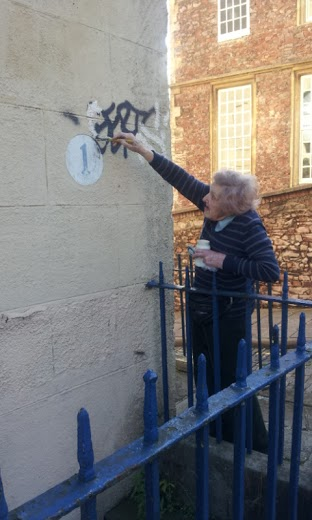
- Born: 14 January 1927; Berwick-upon-Tweed
- Died: 8 October 2013 (aged 86); Redland Library, Bristol
- Occupation: Campaigner
- Known for: Saving Bristol's heritage

Eva Dorothy Brown (14 January 1927 – 8 October 2013) was a campaigner who was recognised with an MBE (1988) for her work to save buildings in Bristol and in the Avon area.

== Biography ==
=== Early life and family ===
Dorothy Brown was born in Berwick-upon-Tweed. She grew up in a farm and was a student at University of Edinburgh where she met her husband Tom. Tom, a vet, accepted a job in Bristol and they moved settling in a town house in Clifton. They had five children.

=== Campaigns ===
She started her heritage work when, after moving to Bristol, she got involved in a campaign to stop the construction of a hotel in the Avon Gorge (1970). The year after she founded the Bristol Visual and Environmental Group (BVEG), through which she continued her fights against the Bristol development plan which threatened the destruction of hundreds of historic buildings. Brown, and some of her collaborators, used the "spot listing" designation to stop the demolition of many buildings, some of which were bought by the BVEG, restored, and sold again to move to the rescue of other buildings. Many battles ended up in front of the Secretary of State and many more were pursued through public enquiries where Dorothy Brown was successful in providing historic evidence and analysis to stop the demolitions.

=== Buildings saved ===
- Acton Court, Iron Acton
- The Lido, Bristol
- 42 Old Market Street, Bristol
- 8-10 West Street, Old Market, Bristol
- 18th-century Brunswick Square in St Paul's
- Wool-merchant's house and coach house in Frome

== Bibliography ==
- Bristol and How it Grew, 1975, ISBN 0-9504648-2-1
- Just look at Bristol!, 1976, ISBN 0-9504648-0-5
- Avon Heritage – The North: The Vale and the Forest, 1979, ISBN 0-9504648-3-X
- Rediscovering Acton Court and the Poyntz Family
- Canons' Marsh, 1988
