= Acton Court =

Grade I listed historic house museum in South Gloucestershire, United Kingdom

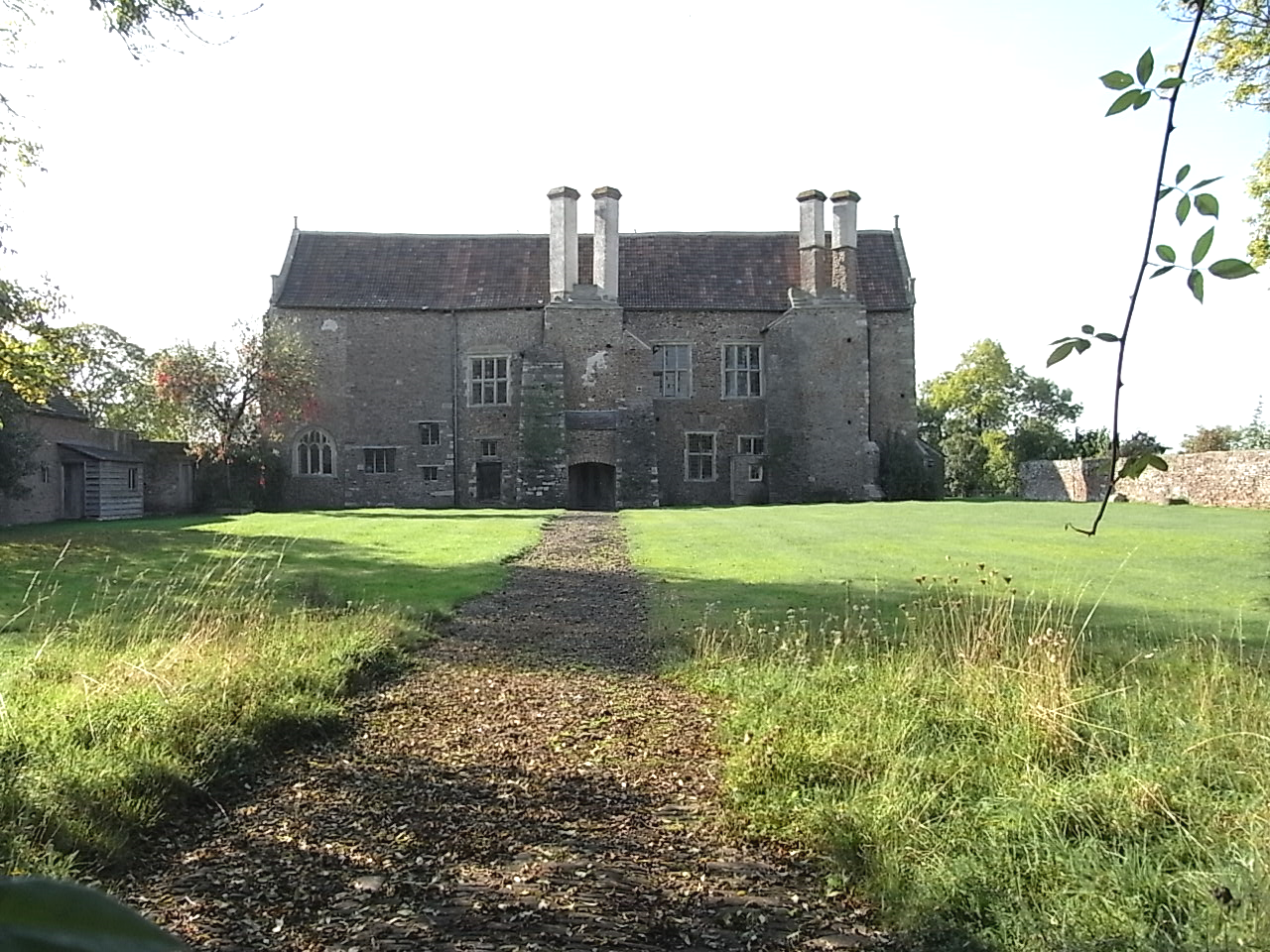
- Acton Court, south front

- Location in Gloucestershire
- 51°33′20.5″N 02°28′02″W
- Location: Gloucestershire, England

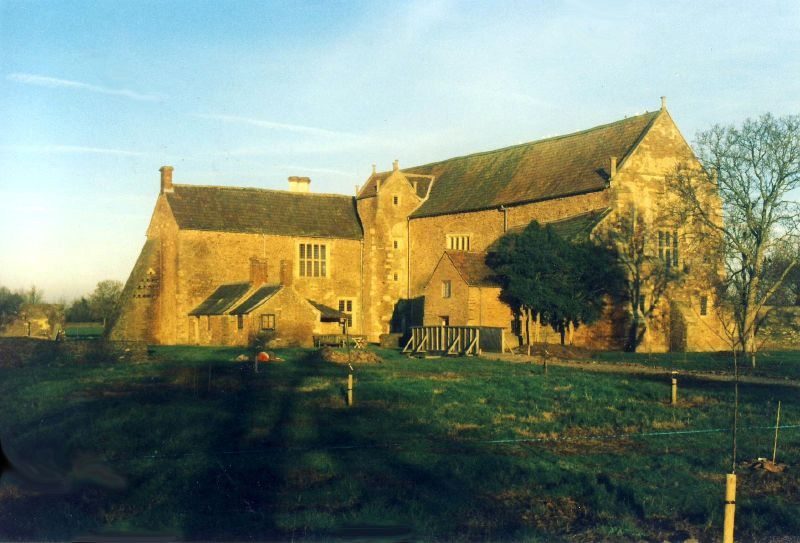
Acton Court, view from north-west

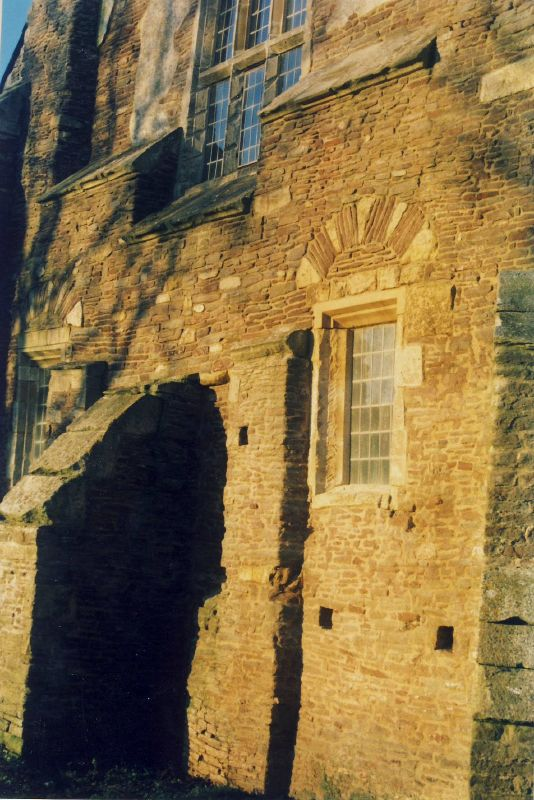
Acton Court, detail of west gable end

Acton Court is the historic manor house of the manor of Iron Acton in Gloucestershire, England. It is a grade I listed building of Tudor architecture and was recently restored. It is situated, at some considerable distance from the village of Iron Acton and the parish church of St Michael, on Latteridge Lane, Iron Acton, South Gloucestershire, England. The Poyntz family owned the property from 1364 until 1680. Nicholas Poyntz (died 1557) added the East Wing onto the existing moated manor house shortly before 1535. Construction took about 9 months to complete. Subsequently, the wing was lavishly and fashionably decorated to impress Henry VIII. The king and his second wife, Anne Boleyn, stayed in the house in 1535, during a tour of the West Country. Building work continued at Acton Court until Nicholas died in 1557.

When the direct line of succession ended in 1680, the house was sold. It was reduced in size and converted for use as a tenanted farmhouse. Due to neglect, the house gradually fell into a dilapidated state. By the end of the 20th century, practically only the East Wing survived. However, the neglect resulted in a rare example of Tudor royal state apartments being preserved virtually intact. The house was purchased at auction in 1984 by Eva Dorothy Brown on behalf of the Bristol Visual and Environmental Group (BVEG). An extensive restoration was completed only recently.

Prior to the restoration, English Heritage commissioned a comprehensive study, published as K. Rodwell and R. Bell, Acton Court: The evolution of an early Tudor courtier's house (2004). The monograph is now publicly available through the Archaeology Data Service
