= Hill, Gloucestershire =

Village in Gloucestershire, England

Coordinates: 51.653°N 2.514°W

Hill (Parish)
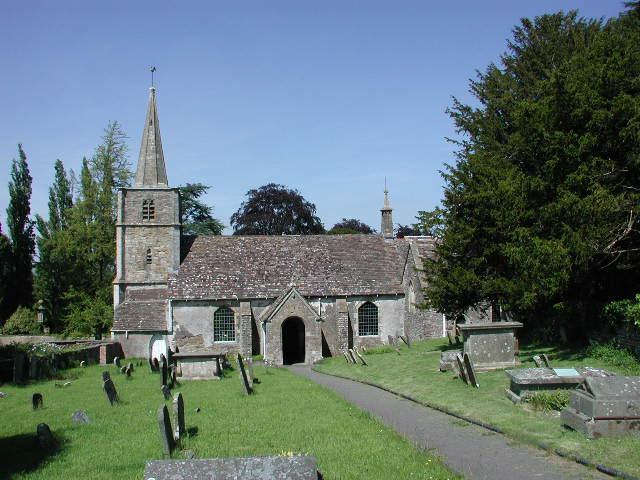
- St Michael's Church, Hill

- Location within Gloucestershire
- Population: 117 (2011 Census)
- OS grid reference: ST 64537 95037
- Civil parish: Hill
- District: South Gloucestershire
- Shire county: Gloucestershire
- Region: South West
- Country: England
- Sovereign state: United Kingdom
- Post town: Berkeley
- Postcode district: GL13
- Dialling code: 01454
- Police: Avon and Somerset
- Fire: Avon
- Ambulance: South Western

Hill is a village and civil parish in South Gloucestershire, England, midway between the towns of Thornbury in South Gloucestershire and Berkeley in Gloucestershire. The parish stretches from the banks of the River Severn to an outcrop of the Cotswolds escarpment. At the 2001 census, it had a population of 114. Hill is approximately 5 miles from the M5 motorway which links to Gloucester, Cheltenham and Bristol.

== History ==
In the Domesday Book, Hill is recorded as Hilla, then later between the years of 1250 to 1455 is referred to frequently as Hulla. It was not until after 1773 until it was more commonly known as Hill.

In 1870-72, John Marius Wilson's Imperial Gazetteer of England and Wales described Hill like this:

HILL, a parish in Thornbury district, Gloucester; adjacent to the river Severn, 4 miles N of Thornbury, and 5½ W by S of Dursley Junction r. station. Posttown, Berkeley. Acres, 2, 476; of which 510 are water. Real property, £4, 146. Pop., 216. Houses, 44. The property is divided among a few. The manor belongs to Herbert Jenner, Esq. Hill Court is an ancient mansion, supposed to occupy the site of a monastery of the 12th century. The living is a donative in the diocese of Gloucester and Bristol. Value, £250.* Patron, Herbert Jenner, Esq. The church is ancient but good; and has a tower and spire.

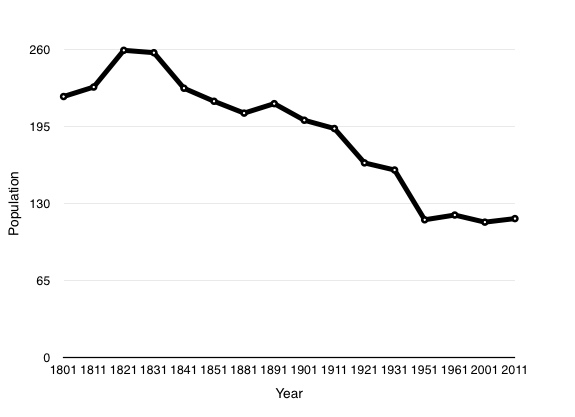
Total population of Hill civil parish, Gloucestershire, as reported by the census of population from 1801-2011

=== Industry and social structure ===
Census data dating back to 1831 shows that the principal industry in Hill has been agriculture, accounting for approximately 75 per cent of the workforce in 1831.

One product still currently farmed in Hill is rapeseed which is commonly grown for the oil-rich seeds used in the production of vegetable oil. The continuing existence of four working farms in Hill today indicates that agriculture is still of importance to the local economy. Historically the second-largest category of employment has been as labourers; this proportion, however, decreased throughout the end of the twentieth century to make way for an increase in professional employment. The employment in agriculture historically was male-dominated; census data from 1881 indicates that 80 per cent of the employed women in Hill were employed in domestic service. According to the 2011 census, the largest proportions of employment in Hill were in the areas of manufacturing, education and retail.

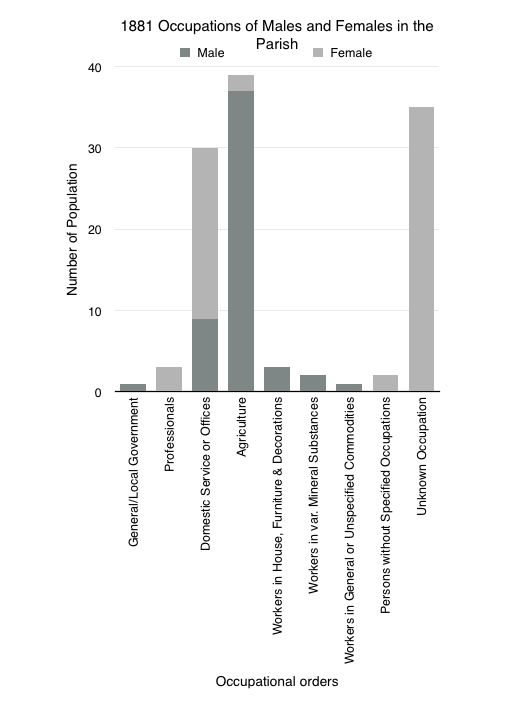
1881 Occupations of Males and Females in Hill, Gloucestershire from 1881 Census data

=== Population history ===
The total number of households in Hill today is similar to the number of households in Hill in 1901. The 1901 census showed there being a total of 40 households, whereas the 2011 census showed there to be a total of 42 households, the majority of which were made up of two adults with one or two children.

=== The Manor of Hill ===
The Manor of Hill, known as Hill Court, was included in a grant of the Barony of Berkeley, bestowed upon Robert Fitzharding by Henry II of England after his ascension to the throne in 1154. The manor was transferred down successive generations of the Berkeley family until it came into the possession of Robert Poyntz of nearby Iron Acton in 1418. The Poyntz family gave up the manor at the beginning of the 17th century, Richard Fust subsequently assuming the lordship in 1609. Built in 1863, the present Hill Court, home of the Jenner-Fust family, replaced an earlier building.

=== The Catgrove Murder ===
On 18 January 1816, a group of sixteen poachers were encountered by a party of gamekeepers belonging to Colonel Berkeley and Lord Ducie at Catgrove, a wooded area in the parish of Hill. Some of the poachers were in possession of firearms, which led to an assistant gamekeeper named William Ingram, a member of Berkeley's contingent, to be shot dead. The poachers fled the scene. Most, but not all, were subsequently apprehended and taken into custody. In total 11 men stood trial, all of whom were found guilty, leading to two of the guilty party being executed the following day and the remaining convicts faced transportation to Australia.

== Geography ==
According to the Ordnance Survey of 1880, the total area of the civil parish of Hill was 2270.7 acres; this included 217.95 acres of foreshore of the tidal River Severn. The boundary of the parish was the centre of the river’s channel at low tide. Over 1500 acres of Hill are meadow and pasture lands, approximately 210 acres of arable land and 130 acres of woodland. Ordnance Survey maps show Hill to have four small areas of woodland, in order of descending size these areas are; Catgrove, Fishpond Wood, Church-hill Wood and Ash Grove. Along with these Woodland areas, Ordnance Survey maps also show a number of small streams running through the centre and towards the west of the parish. The British History Online’s website contains an extract from A Topographical Dictionary of England (1848) by Samuel Lewis, which described Hill’s geography as:

The surface of the western portion, extending to the river, which is here more than two miles wide, is a complete level, clothed with luxuriant herbage, and studded with numerous groups of stately trees; the eastern portion is finely undulated, rising into eminences of considerable elevation, two of which, immediately above the mansion of Hill Court, command extensive prospects. The soil is chiefly a loam, producing abundant crops.

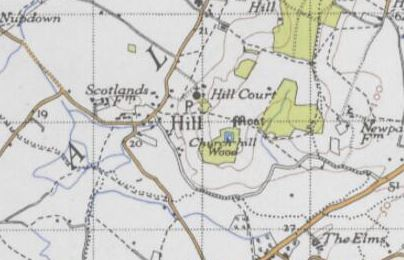
20th Century Ordnance Survey Map of Hill, Gloucestershire

== St Michael the Archangel's Church ==
Hill is home to one parish church, St Michael the Archangel's Church. St Michael's belongs to the Church of England and is in the archdeaconry and Diocese of Gloucester. The church was originally constructed in the 13th century and is a Grade II* listed building. The church has undergone restorations; the nave was rebuilt in 1759 and the mortuary chapel was stored in the early 18th century, both by Francis Fust. The chancel was restored in 1870 by Ewan Christian, followed by the rebuilding of the porch and addition of buttresses in 1909 by William Weir and Temple Moore.
