= Nicholas Poyntz (MP died 1585) =

English politician (1528–1585)

Sir Nicholas Poyntz (c. 1528 – 1585) was an English politician.

== Life ==
Poyntz was born the eldest son of Sir Nicholas Poyntz, courtier and Knight of the Shire for Gloucestershire, and his wife Joan Berkeley, daughter of Thomas Berkeley, 5th Baron Berkeley. He succeeded his father in 1566 and was knighted (KB) in 1559. He was a member (MP) of the Parliament of England for Totnes in 1559 and for Gloucestershire in 1571. He was appointed High Sheriff of Gloucestershire for 1569–70. His mother made a disastrous second marriage to Sir Thomas Dyer, whose cruelty is reputed to have caused her death in 1564. Nicholas, a very sensitive man, is said never to have recovered from his mother's unhappiness and subsequent death.

He married twice, first with Anne, the daughter of Sir Ralph Verney of Penley, Hertfordshire with whom he had a son, John Pointz and two daughters and then with Margaret, the daughter of Edward Stanley, 3rd Earl of Derby with whom he had a further three sons.

== Death ==
Poyntz died in 1585. He was strongly suspected of being a Roman Catholic. His will caused a lawsuit which dragged on for a generation.
