= John Poyntz =

16th-century English politician and courtier

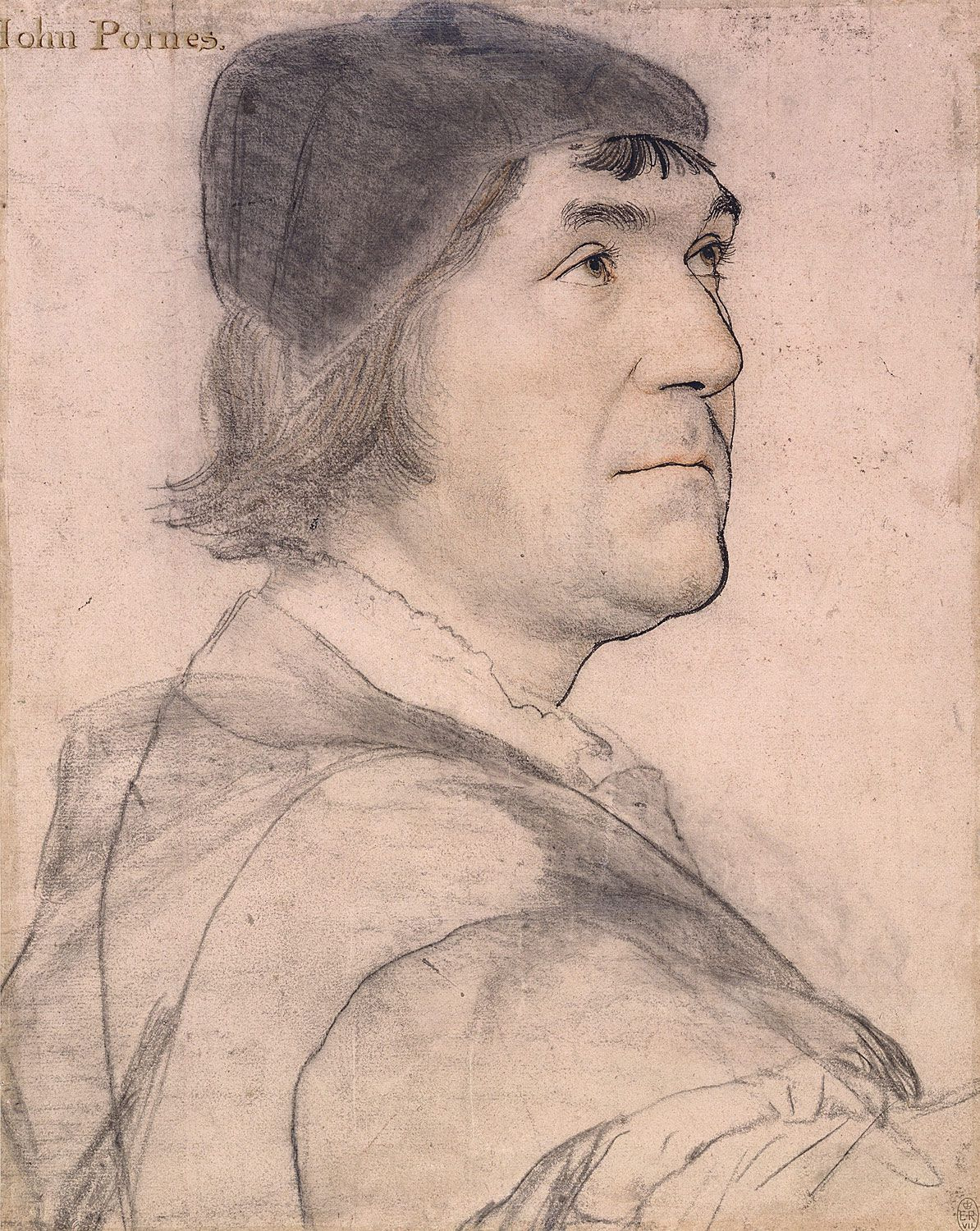
John Poyntz by Hans Holbein the Younger

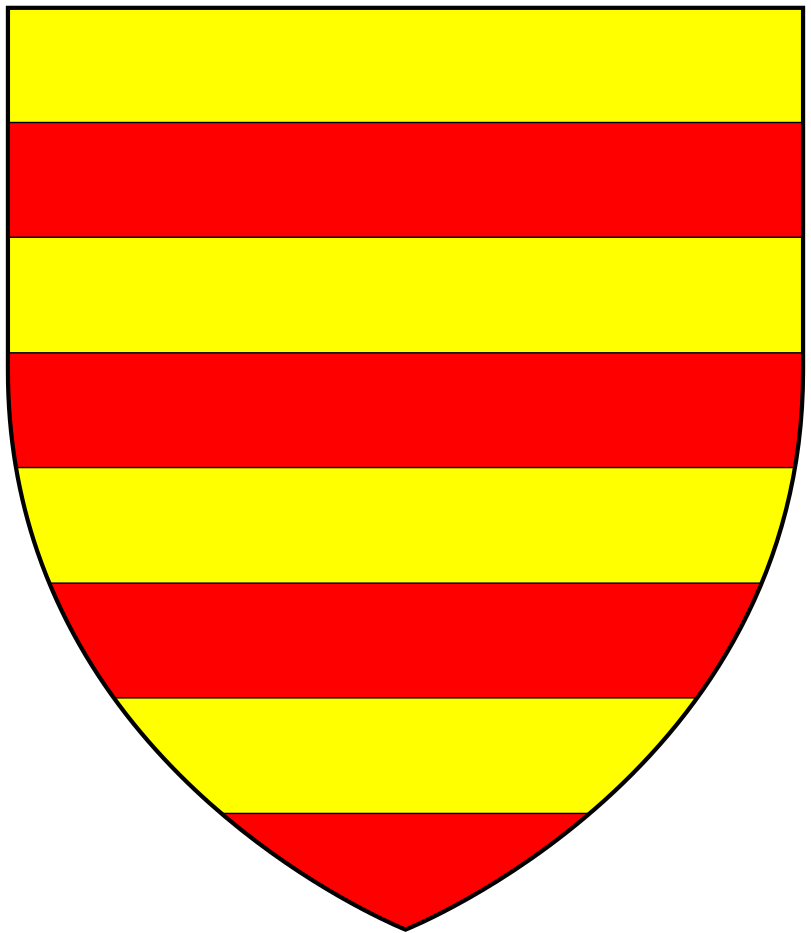
Arms of Poyntz: Barry of eight or and gules

John Poyntz (ca. 1485 – 1544) was an English courtier and politician, Member of Parliament for Devizes in 1529.

Poyntz was the second son of Sir Robert Poyntz of Iron Acton, Gloucestershire, by Margaret, an illegitimate daughter of Anthony Woodville, 2nd Earl Rivers, making Margaret a first cousin, once removed, to King Henry VIII. Dame Margaret Poyntz was appointed to wait on Catherine of Aragon in October 1501.

He was the brother of vice-admiral Anthony Poyntz and the uncle of Nicholas Poyntz. John Poyntz was sewer to Catherine of Aragon in 1520. The sewer was responsible for the presentation and serving of dishes to the nobility. He was friends with the poet Sir Thomas Wyatt, who wrote a satire on ‘mine own John Poyntz’ which reflected upon Poyntz’s disillusionment with the hypocrisy and betrayal in Henry’s court following the death of Anne Boleyn, resulting in his decision to leave court. A painting and a drawing of Poyntz by Holbein survive.

His family home was at Alderley, Gloucestershire. John Poyntz married, by 1528, Elizabeth, the daughter of Sir Matthew Browne of Betchworth Castle, Surrey. He married, secondly, Margaret Saunders. His eldest son, Nicholas Poynts married Winifred Wylde

John Poyntz died in 1544, after taking part in the first siege of Boulogne. His widow Margaret married James Skinner (MP).

There was another contemporary courtier of this name, John Poyntz (died 1547) of North Ockendon, whose wife Anne Poyntz was "mother of the maids" in the household of Mary I of England.
