= Anthony Poyntz =

English diplomat

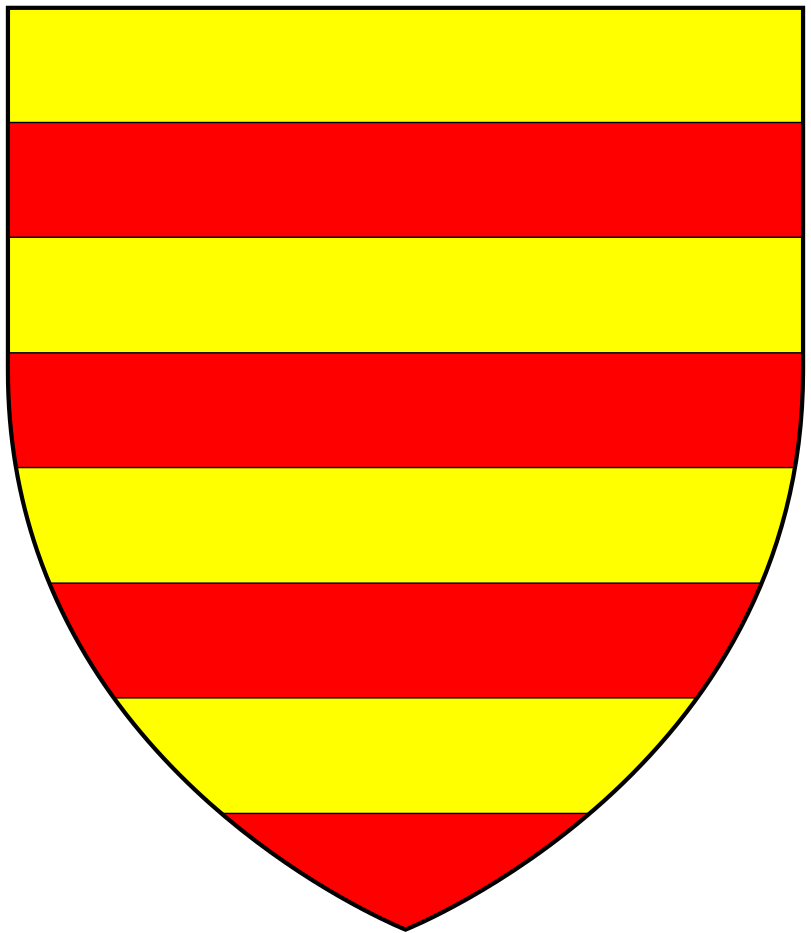
Arms of Poyntz: Barry of eight or and gules

Sir Anthony Poyntz (1480? – 1532) was an English diplomat and naval commander.

== Life ==
In 1507-1508, Poyntz served as High Sheriff of Gloucestershire. He was knighted in 1513, when he commanded a ship in Thomas Howard's expedition against France. In September 1518 he was sent on an embassy to the French king, and was present at the Field of the Cloth of Gold in July 1520. One of his daughters was a lady in waiting to Catherine of Aragon at the Field of the Cloth of Gold.

Poyntz's father died in November, and he inherited Iron Acton, which his family had held since the mid-14th century. In 1521, he was one of the jury at Bristol before whom Edward Stafford, 3rd Duke of Buckingham was indicted.

In 1522 Poyntz joined in the expedition to France of Thomas Howard, 2nd Duke of Norfolk in command of the Santa Maria. In the following year he became vice-admiral, and was employed in command of some twelve or fourteen sail in preventing the return of John Stewart, Duke of Albany to Scotland. In 1522-1523 and 1527-1528, he again served as High Sheriff of Gloucestershire. In 1529 he was a witness in the proceedings for the divorce of Catherine of Aragon and in 1530 was on a commission to inquire into Thomas Wolsey's possessions.

Poyntz died in 1532.

== Family ==
Poyntz was the son of Robert Poyntz, and Margaret Woodville, an illegitimate daughter of Anthony Woodville, 2nd Earl Rivers.

Poyntz married by 1510 Elizabeth Huddesfield, daughter of William Huddesfield (d. 1499). Their children were:

- Nicholas Poyntz
- Margaret, who married John Newton of Barrs Court, Gloucestershire and East Harptree, Somerset
- Mary who married Edward Gorges of Wraxall, Somerset

After Elizabeth's death Poyntz married Joan, widow of Richard Guilford.
