= William Guildford =

English politician

William Guildford (died 1394) was an English landowner and politician from Kent who sat as MP for the county in 1380 and 1384 and was Sheriff in 1387.

== Life ==
Born before 1359, he was the first member of his family to sit in Parliament, being elected for Kent in 1380 and in 1384. In the eleventh year of King Richard II (22 June 1387 to 21 June 1388) he acquired from the Crown the manor of Hemsted in the parish of Benenden that had been forfeited by Sir Robert Belknap, chief justice of the common pleas, and he was chosen sheriff of the county in that year. He died in 1394.

== Family ==
About 1385 he married Joan Halden, daughter and heiress of John Halden, through whom he inherited the manor of Halden in the adjacent parish of Rolvenden, which became the principal residence of his family. Their son was Edward Guildford, who followed his father as Sheriff and MP for the county.
