= Nicholas Poyntz =

English politician, courtier and landowner

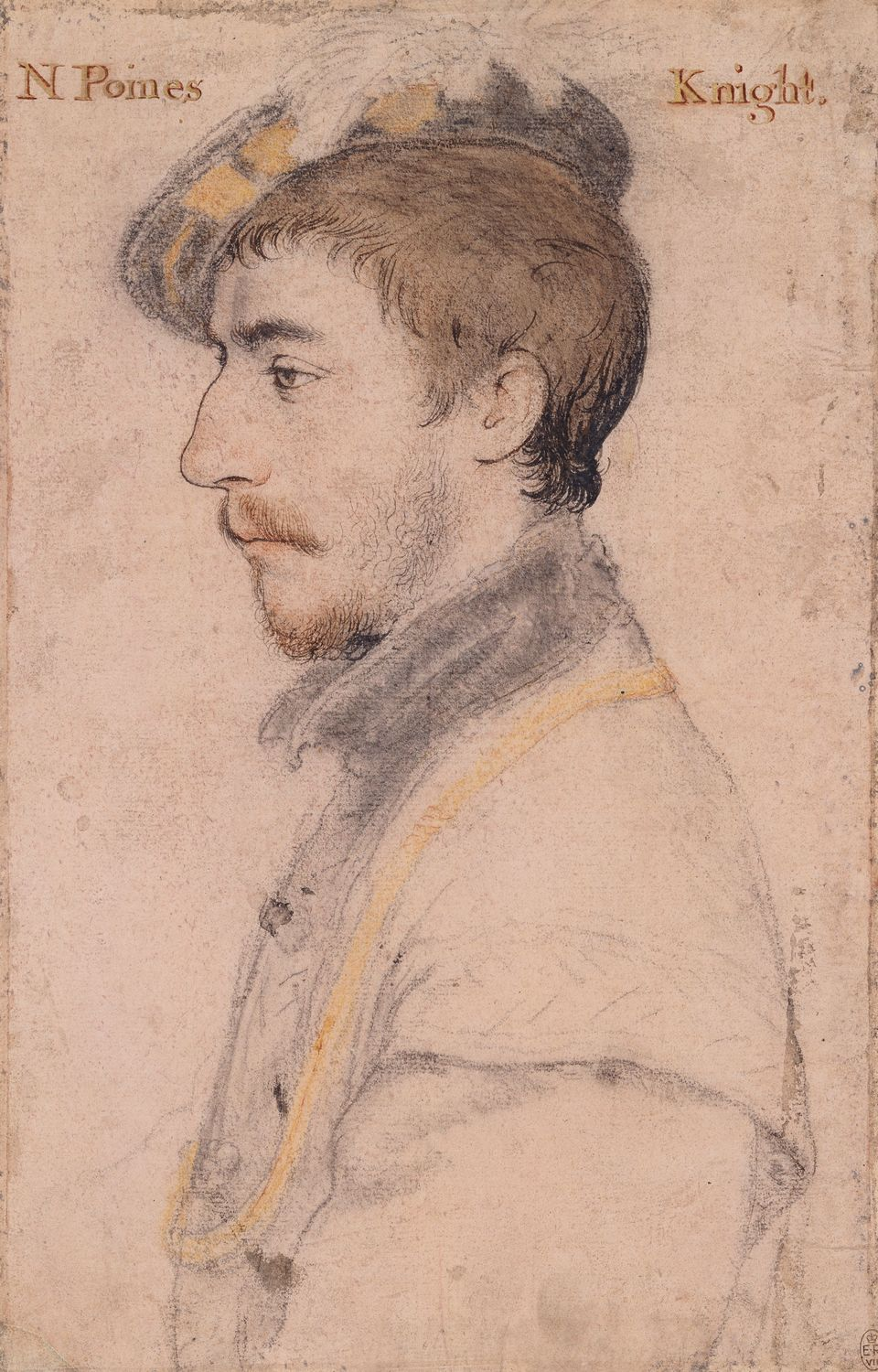
Nicholas Poyntz (d. 1557), drawing by Hans Holbein the Younger, Royal Collection, RL 12234

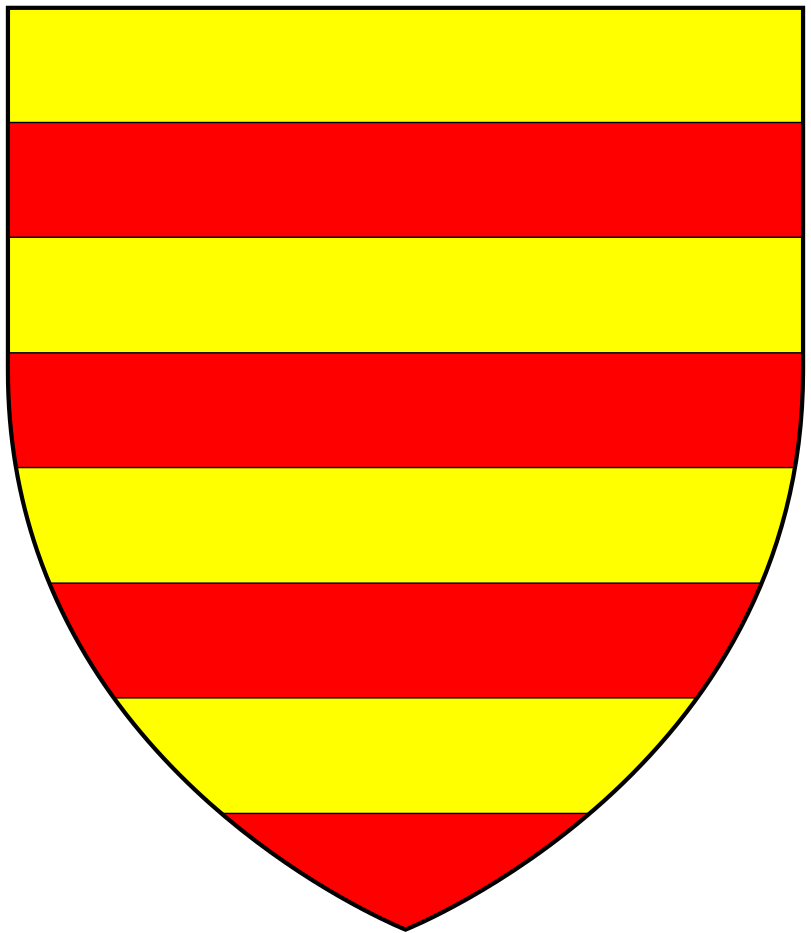
Arms of Poyntz: Barry of eight or and gules

Sir Nicholas Poyntz (1510—circa 28 November 1556) was a prominent English courtier during the latter part of Henry VIII's reign.

== Life ==
Poyntz was the eldest son of Anthony Poyntz (1480?–1532), vice-admiral, and his first wife, Elizabeth Huddefield. His uncle was John Poyntz.

On 21 August 1535, Henry VIII and Anne Boleyn visited Poyntz at Acton Court, Iron Acton, Gloucestershire. Poyntz had built a special new lodging for his royal guests, which still survives. It contained three first-floor state rooms, and one of these still has painted decorations by an artist of the Tudor court. These staterooms are connected to the older house by a covered walkway called a "pentice". Archaeological excavations found fragments of precious Venetian glass and maiolica which Poyntz probably bought for the visit. The evidence of lengthy preparations by Poyntz at Acton shows that Henry's progress in the west of England was planned in advance.

In 1539 and 1545, Poyntz served as High Sheriff of Gloucestershire and in 1547 represented Gloucestershire in Parliament as a Knight of the Shire.

Between 1544 and 1556 Poyntz built a hunting lodge Newark Park, near the village of Ozleworth, Wotton-under-Edge, Gloucestershire. This was built at about the same time as nearby Siston Court was being built by Maurice Denys (d.1563), first cousin of Poyntz's wife Joan Berkeley. He was elected Member of Parliament (MP) for Cricklade in 1555.

During the war of the Rough Wooing with Scotland (1543–1550), Poyntz commanded the warship the Great Galley. In May 1544, Edward Seymour sent him to burn Kinghorn and other towns in Fife, while Edinburgh was sacked and burnt.

Poyntz married Joan, daughter of Thomas Berkeley, Baron Berkeley (d. 1533) with whom he had five or six sons and three daughters. He died on 27 or 28 November 1556. He was succeeded by his eldest son, Nicholas. After his death, his widow made a disastrous second marriage to Thomas Dyer, who treated her cruelly. She died in 1564.

There is a portrait drawing of Poyntz by Hans Holbein the Younger in the Royal Collection and an oil portrait after the same artist based on the drawing in the National Portrait Gallery, London. One further portrait also exists after Holbein.

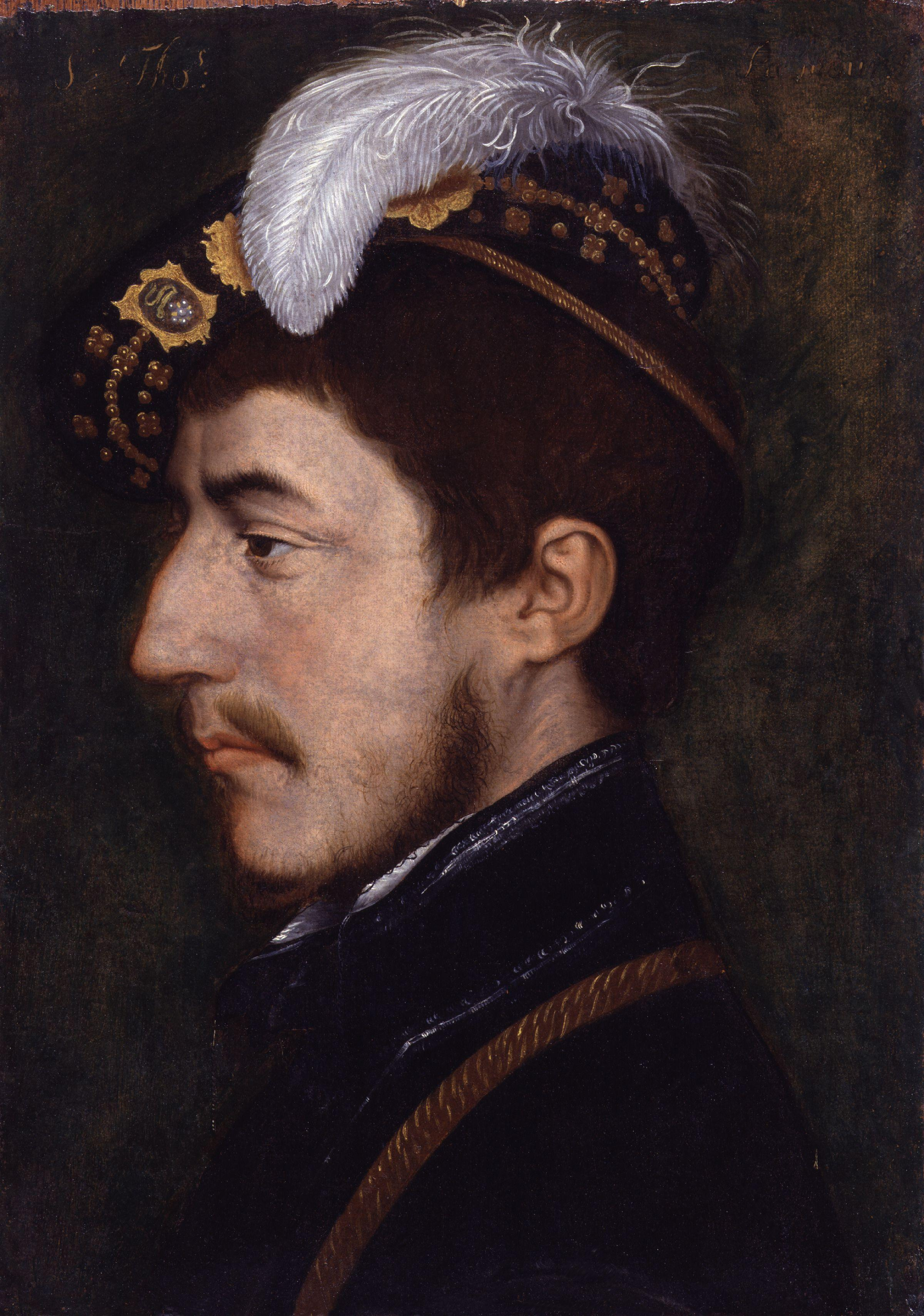
Sir Nicholas Poyntz, after Hans Holbein the Younger (National Portrait Gallery)

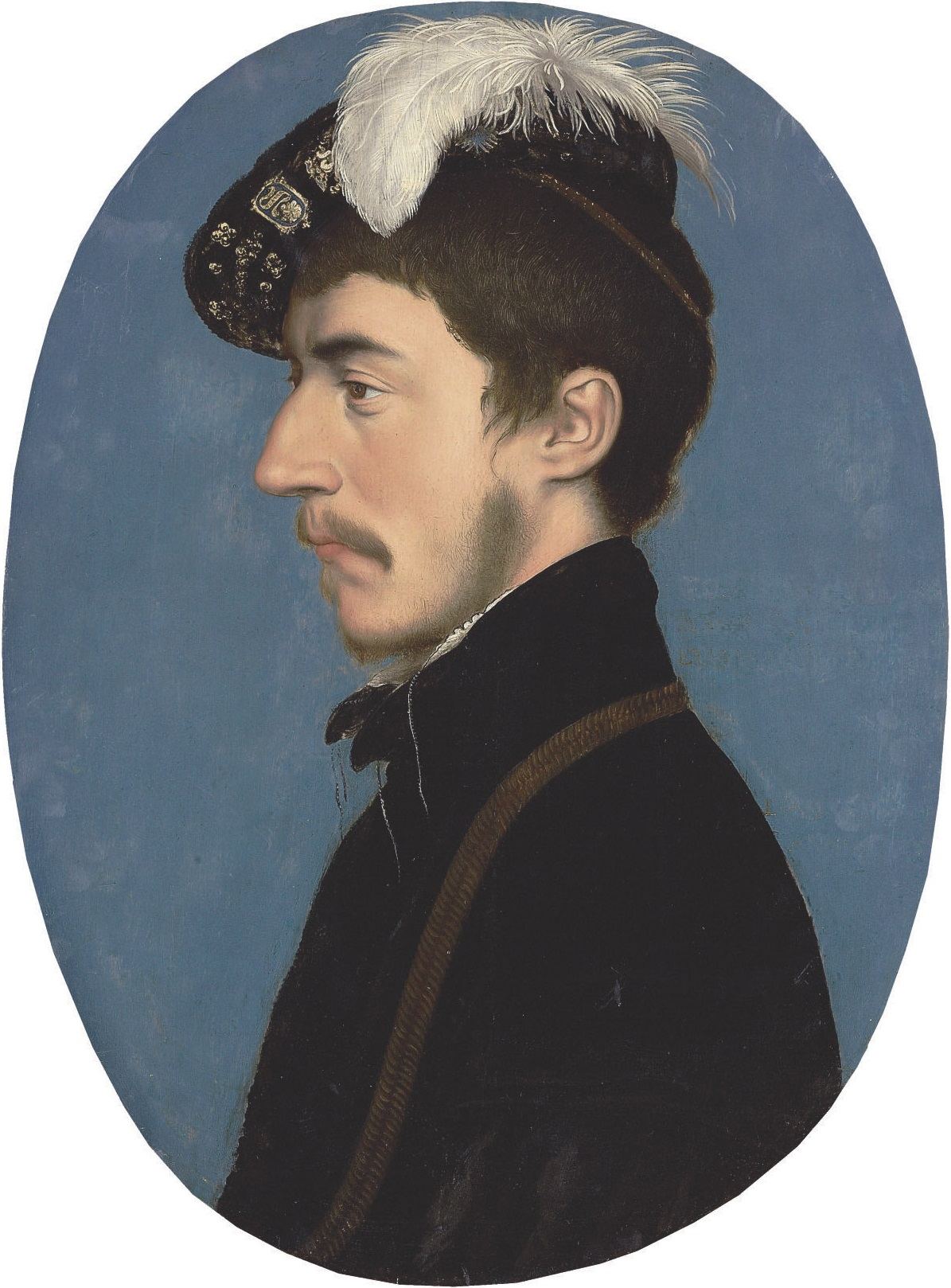
Sir Nicholas Poyntz, after Hans Holbein the Younger (private collection)
