= Richard Guildford =

English military leader and courtier (about 1450 – 1506)

The Right Honourable Sir Richard Guildford KG
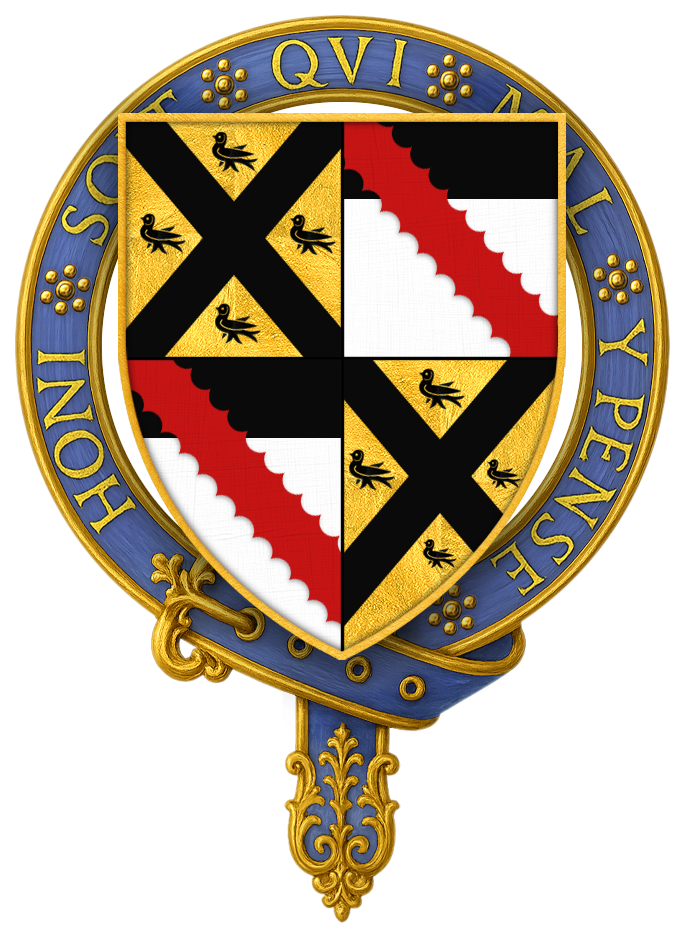
- Arms of Richard Guildford, Quarterly 1st and 4th Or a saltire between four martlets Sable (Guildford); 2nd and 3rd Argent a chief Sable overall a bend engrailed Gules (Halden)
- Born: about 1450; Kent, England
- Died: 6 September 1506 (aged 55–56); Jerusalem, Mamluk Sultanate
- Spouses: Anne Pympe; Joan Vaux
- Issue: Edward Guildford; Henry Guildford
- Father: John Guildford
- Mother: Alice Waller

Sir Richard Guildford (about 1450 – 1506) was an English courtier, administrator, politician and military leader who held important positions under King Henry VII.

== Origins ==
Guildford was the son of John Guildford (died 1493) and his first wife, Alice Waller.

== Career ==
Guildford was relied on as a counsellor by Reginald Bray, who chose him as one of the four persons to whom he first communicated the plot behind Buckingham's rebellion against Richard III in 1483. Both father and son raised forces that year for the Earl of Richmond (the future Henry VII) in Kent, and were attainted in consequence. The son, who thereby forfeited some lands in Cranbrook, fled to Richmond in Brittany, and returned with him two years later, landing along with him at Milford Haven, where he is said to have been knighted. It is presumed he was with Henry at the Battle of Bosworth. Little more than a month later, on 29 September 1485, the new king appointed him one of the chamberlains of the receipt of exchequer, Master of the Ordnance and of the Armouries, with houses on Tower Wharf, and keeper of the royal manor of Kennington, where the king took up his abode before his coronation.

When Henry's first parliament met, Guildford's attainder was reversed. As master of the armoury he had to prepare the 'justes' for the king's coronation. The king also made him a privy councillor and granted him various lands and some wardships which fell vacant. Among the former was the manor of Higham in Sussex. His forte lay in the control of artillery and fortifications, engineering and shipbuilding, for which various payments to him are recorded. The lands he won from the sea were called Guilford Level. In 1486, he received payment for the making of a ship in the county of Kent; on 8 March 1487, he was paid as master of a vessel called the Mary Gylford, named probably after a daughter, who, in Henry VIII's time, was married to one Christopher Kempe. There were more payments for shipbuilding.

In 1487 the treasurer and barons of the exchequer had seized the office of chamberlain of the receipt, which had been granted to Guildford by the king for life; but he obtained a warrant under the privy seal to prevent them proceeding further until the king himself had examined the official arrangements, with a view apparently to greater efficiency. A little later, he surrendered the office, which was then granted to Giles Daubeny, 8th Baron Daubeny. On 14 July 1487 Guildford was granted the wardship, marriage and custody of her lands during her minority of Elizabeth Mortimer, daughter and heiress of Robert Mortimer (d. 22 August 1485) of Landmere in Thorpe-le-Soken, slain at Bosworth, by Isabel Howard, daughter of John Howard, 1st Duke of Norfolk. Guildford later married Elizabeth to his second son, George. In September 1489 certain alterations were ordered to be made in the buildings of Westminster Palace under the direction of Guildford and the Earl of Ormonde.

In 1490, Guildford undertook to serve the king at sea with 550 marines and soldiers, in three ships, for two months from 12 July. On 20 February 1492, Henry VII made his will in view of his proposed invasion of France, and appointed Guildford one of his trustees. He accompanied the king to Boulogne, and attended him at the meeting with the French commissioners for peace immediately after. On 1 February 1493, he was given the wardship and marriage of Thomas, grandson and heir of Sir Thomas Delamere. On 19 July, he lost his father, Sir John Guildford, a privy councillor like himself, who was buried in Canterbury Cathedral. In 1493-1494, he was appointed High Sheriff of Kent.

About 1495, Guildford was named one of six commissioners to arrange with the Spanish ambassador about the marriage of Prince Arthur and Catherine of Aragon. In the parliament that assembled in October 1495, he was one of those members who announced to the chancellor the election of the speaker. In that parliament, he obtained an act for disgavelling his lands in Kent. About this time, he was controller of the royal household, and on 21 April 1496, he was made steward of the lands which had belonged to the Duchess of York in Surrey and Sussex.

On 17 June 1497, Guildford assisted in defeating the Cornish rebels at Blackheath, for which service he was created a banneret. In 1499, he and Richard Hatton were commissioned by the king to go in quest of Edmund de la Pole, 3rd Duke of Suffolk, after his first flight to the continent, and persuade him to come back. He had a further charge to go to the Archduke Philip, but the priority was the bringing back of De la Pole, and he was instructed to forego that journey if the refugee would not return without him. In 1500, he went over with the king to the meeting with the archduke at Calais. In the same year, he was elected a Knight of the Garter. In 1501, as controller of the household, he had much to do with the arrangements for the reception of Catherine of Aragon. On 4 April 1506, he had what was called a special pardon: a discharge of liabilities in respect of his offices of master of the ordnance and of the armoury, and also as master of the horse.

== Pilgrimage and death ==
On 7 April 1506, Guildford made his will. The next day, he embarked at Rye along with John Whitby, prior of Gisburn in Yorkshire, on a pilgrimage to the Holy Land. They landed the next day in Normandy, and passed through France, Savoy, and the north of Italy to Venice, whence, after some stay, they sailed on 3 July. After visiting Crete and Cyprus on their way, they reached Jaffa on 18 Aug. But before landing, they had to send a message to Jerusalem to the warden of Mount Sion, and they remained seven days in their galley till he came with the lords of Jerusalem and Rama, without whose escort no pilgrims were allowed to pass. Two more days were spent in debating the tribute to be paid by the company before they could be allowed to land, so that they only disembarked on 27 August. They were forced by the Mamelukes to spend a night and a day in a cave, and when allowed to proceed upon their journey, both Guildford and the prior fell ill. They did reach Jerusalem, but the prior died there on 5 September, and Guildford the next day. Guildford's chaplain prepared an account of 'The Pylgrymage of Sir Richard Guylforde to the Holy Land, A.D. 1506,’ which Richard Pynson printed in 1511. It was reprinted by Sir Henry Ellis for the Camden Society in 1851. His will was proved on 10 May 1508.

== Marriages and issue ==
Guildford married firstly Anne Pympe, daughter of John Pympe of Kent. They had two sons and five daughters:

- Edward Guildford; married first, before 1496, Eleanor West, daughter of Thomas West, 8th Baron De La Warr. His second wife was Joan Pitlesden, daughter of Stephen Pidlesten.
- George Guildford; married his father's ward, Elizabeth Mortimer, the daughter and heir of Robert Mortimer (d. 22 August 1485) of Landmere in Thorpe-le-Soken.
- Philippa Guildford; married by settlement dated 14 April 1502, John Gage (d. 18 April 1556).
- Mary Guildford; married first Christopher Kempe (1485-1512), and second William Haute (d. 1539) of Bishopsbourne, Kent.
- Frideswide Guildford; married Matthew Browne (d. 6 August 1557) of Betchworth Castle, Surrey, son of George Browne.
- Elizabeth Guildford (before 1489-1532+); married first Thomas Well, second Thomas Isley (1485-1518) of Sundridge, Kent, and third William Stafford.
- Eleanor Guildford; married Edward Haute.

Guildford married secondly, in the presence of Henry VII and Elizabeth of York, Joan Vaux (d. 1538). They had a son:

- Henry Guildford; married secondly Mary Wotton, daughter of Robert Wotton of Boughton Malherbe, Kent.

Guildford's widow, Joan, who survived him for many years, accompanied Henry VIII's sister Mary Tudor into France in 1514, and had afterwards an annuity for her service to Henry VII and his queen and their two daughters, Mary, Queen of France, and Margaret, Queen of Scots.
