= Thomas Berkeley, 5th Baron Berkeley =

English soldier and aristocrat (1472-1532)

Thomas Berkeley
- Born: 1472; England
- Died: 22 January 1532 (aged 59 or 60); England
- Buried: Bristol Cathedral, England
- Spouses: Alienor Constable; Cecily Arnold
- Issue: Thomas Berkeley; Maurice Berkeley; Muriel Berkeley; Joan Berkeley
- Father: Maurice Berkeley, 3rd Baron Berkeley
- Mother: Isabel Meade

Thomas Berkeley, de jure 5th Baron Berkeley, (1472 – 22 January 1532) was an English soldier and aristocrat.

He was born to Sir Maurice Berkeley, de jure 3rd Baron Berkeley, and Isabel Meade, in England. He was the younger brother to Maurice Berkeley, de jure 4th Baron Berkeley, and had a younger brother, James, and a younger sister, Anne.

On 9 September 1513, he fought in the Battle of Flodden and was knighted by the Earl of Surrey, Thomas Howard. He later became Constable of Berkeley Castle on 15 May 1514, and Sheriff of Gloucestershire, November 1522 – November 1523. By writ, he was succeeded to the title of de jure 5th Baron Berkeley on 12 September 1523 after his brother Maurice's death, and his eldest son Thomas followed as the de jure 6th Baron Berkeley, again by writ.

== Marriage and children ==
He firstly married in 1504/1505, to Alienor Constable (c. 1485 – 1540), daughter of Marmaduke Constable, eldest son of Sir Robert Constable (4 April 1423 – 23 May 1488) of Flamborough, Yorkshire, and Agnes Wentworth (died 20 April 1496), daughter of Roger Wentworth of North Elmsall, Yorkshire and Margery le Despencer, by his second wife, Joyce Stafford, daughter of Sir Humphrey Stafford (c. 1427 – 8 July 1486), who was the son of Sir Humphrey Stafford (c. 1400 – 7 June 1450) of Grafton, Worcestershire and Eleanor Aylesbury (born c. 1406), the daughter of Sir Thomas Aylesbury (died 9 September 1418) and his second wife, Katherine Pabenham (c.1372 – 17 June 1436). Alienor was the widow of John Ingleby of Ripley, Yorkshire. Thomas and Alienor had two sons and two daughters.

- Thomas Berkeley, de jure 6th Baron Berkeley (1505 – 19 September 1534), married, firstly, Mary Hastings and had no issue. His second marriage was to Anne Savage (c. 1506 – died before 1546) in April 1533, which produced a son and a daughter. His son, Henry Berkeley, became the de facto 7th Baron Berkeley in 1553.
- Maurice Berkeley (c. 1507 – 1523)
- Muriel Berkeley (1518 – 1541), was married to Robert Throckmorton of Coughton Court, Warwickshire (1513 – 1581), in 1527, and had one son and four daughters.
- Joan Berkeley (d. 31 March 1563) who firstly married Nicholas Poyntz on 24 Jun 1527. Secondly, she married Thomas Dyer sometime after 1556. Dyer's ill-treatment of Joan was a source of scandal, and is thought to have caused her death in 1564.

His second wife was Cecily Arnold, daughter and co-heiress to Sir Arnold of Gloucestershire, widow of Richard Rowdon, Sheriff of Gloucestershire.

Peerage of England
Preceded by Maurice Berkeley	de jure Baron Berkeley; 1523–1532	Succeeded by Thomas Berkeley
