= Joan Vaux (lady-in-waiting) =

English courtier

- Lady Guildford
- Born: c. 1463
- Died: 4 September 1538 (aged 74–75)
- Buried: 9 September 1538; Convent of Blackfriars, London
- Noble family: Vaux
- Spouses: Sir Richard Guildford; Sir Anthony Poyntz
- Issue: Henry Guildford
- Father: Sir William Vaux
- Mother: Katherine Penyston
- Occupation: Lady-in-waiting, Lady Governess

Joan Vaux, Lady Guildford (c. 1463 – 4 September 1538), also known as Mother Guildford, was an English courtier who was the Lady Governess to the Princess Mary Tudor. She accompanied Mary Tudor to France when she married King Louis XII in 1514.

She had been a lady-in-waiting of Elizabeth of York, Queen consort of King Henry VII of England. While at court, she met the scholar and philosopher Erasmus, who was favourably impressed by Joan.

Her first husband was Sir Richard Guildford, by whom she had her only child, Sir Henry Guildford. Her second husband was Anthony Poyntz.

When King Henry VIII was attempting to divorce his first wife, Catherine of Aragon in order to marry Anne Boleyn, Joan gave a deposition, concerning whether or not Catherine's marriage to Arthur, Prince of Wales, had been consummated, in which she confirmed that Prince Arthur and Catherine had lain together "as man and wife all alone five or six nights after the said marriage".

== Family and marriage ==
In 1489, she married her first husband, Sir Richard Guildford (1455 – 6 September 1506). King Henry and Queen Elizabeth both attended the wedding.

Sir Richard and Joan had one son:

- Sir Henry Guildford (died 1532), courtier, Master of the Horse, and comptroller of the royal household; married twice but had no children by either of his wives.

== Lady Governess ==
By the year 1499, she served as the Lady Governess to Princess Mary. It was Joan upon whom Princess Mary chiefly relied on as a child. She met the Dutch philosopher and humanist Erasmus when he paid a visit to the royal children. Erasmus referred to Joan in 1519 in a letter to her son, Henry, as "the noble lady your mother", wishing her happiness and prosperity.

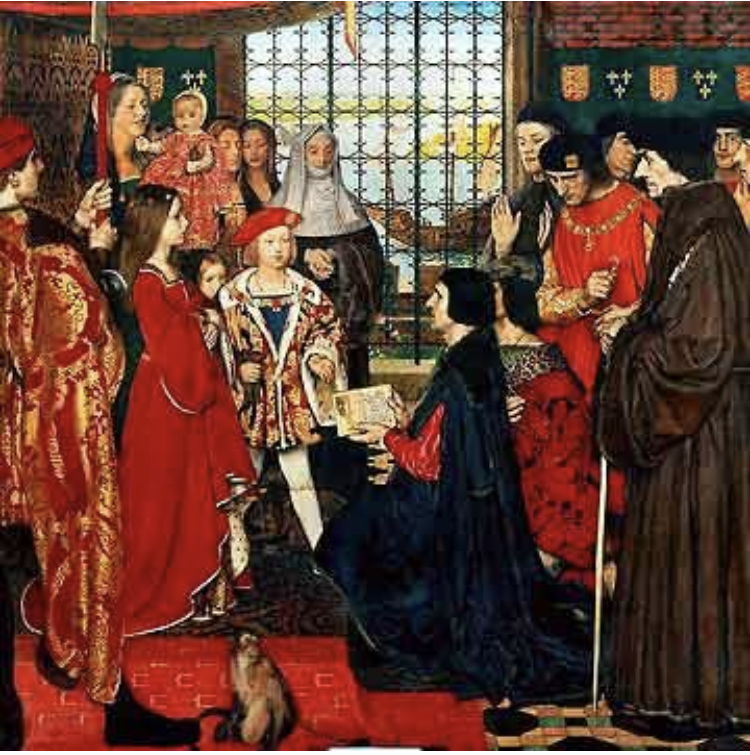
Erasmus visiting the children of Henry VII accompanied by Joan Vaux

She was summoned to wait upon Queen Elizabeth for the arrival of Catherine of Aragon in 1501. Shortly before the Infanta's marriage to Prince Arthur, according to The Recyt of the Ladie Kateryne, on 6 November Joan was at Dogmersfield Park and partnered Prince Arthur in a Spanish dance accompanied by Catherine's musicians, "Lady Guildford danced right pleasant and honourably".

Queen Elizabeth's accounts mention that Lady Guildford gave her money to play at dice at Ewelme in October 1502. She was paid her wage in March 1503, and then accompanied Princess Margaret to Scotland. Margaret had written "Cest marguerite" in Lady Guildford's prayer book. Lady Guildford attended Margaret's wedding to James IV at Holyrood Abbey. In Scotland, James IV gave Joan a gold chain in October 1503, and his goldsmith John Currour set a precious stone for her in January 1504.

After her husband died in Jerusalem in 1506, where he had gone on pilgrimage, she once again entered the household of Margaret Beaufort, where she remained until the latter's death in 1509. By 1510, she had retired from the court, and was living on a small pension in a house in Blackfriars, London. That same year, she inherited a life interest in a house in Southwark, along with lands in Norfolk and Suffolk from Sir Thomas Brandon. She was compelled to pay Brandon's nephew, Sir William Sidney, the sum of 20 marks a year in rent. She leased the Southwark property back to Brandon's heir, Charles Brandon, 1st Duke of Suffolk.

In 1514, she accompanied her former charge, Princess Mary, to France on the occasion of the latter's marriage to King Louis XII. Following the wedding ceremony, when he sent Joan home, along with most of Mary's English attendants, Mary became angry and objected to the dismissal of her "Mother Guildford". On 12 October she protested in a letter to Cardinal Thomas Wolsey, writing "I have not yet seen in France any lady or gentleman so necessary for me as she is". In a lengthy, tactfully-written letter, Cardinal Wolsey asked King Louis to recall Joan to Mary's service saying "I have no doubt, Sire, that when you know her [Joan] well, you will find her a wise, honourable, and discreet lady".

Queen Mary's protests and Cardinal Wolsey's letter were to no avail, as King Louis had taken an especial dislike to Joan, due to the fact that she had taken it upon herself to rule Mary, and had curtailed Louis's intimacy with his wife, refusing to leave the couple alone with the result that his efforts to establish a relationship with Mary were continually frustrated. Joan was duly sent back to England with the other ladies, and resumed her retirement. In 1515, King Henry VIII granted her two pensions totalling £60 per annum. In 1519, she was granted for life an annual gift of a tun of duty-free Gascon wine.

It is possible that she later returned to court as a lady-in-waiting to Catherine of Aragon.

== The King's Great Matter ==
When Henry VIII became enamoured of Anne Boleyn and sought to annul his marriage to Catherine of Aragon on the grounds that it was invalid due to Catherine having been his brother's widow (which violated a passage in the Book of Leviticus in the Bible), he sought witnesses to testify that Catherine and Arthur had consummated their marriage. (See main article: Henry VIII of England)

As a former lady in the household of Elizabeth of York, Joan was summoned to give a deposition as to whether Prince Arthur and Catherine of Aragon had consummated their marriage. She reported that they had spent their wedding night "in together in the same bed", from her personal knowledge; and that she had heard from Queen Elizabeth herself that Arthur and Catherine had lain together "as man and wife all alone five or six nights after the said marriage".

== Later years ==
Joan married her second husband, Sir Anthony Poyntz, on an unknown date.

It is recorded that she received several New Year's gifts from Henry VIII, including a garter with a gold buckle and pendant in 1532.

After Poyntz's death in 1533, she retired to the Hospital of St. Mark, a prayer house in Bristol. When this was closed down in 1536, she returned to Blackfriars, where she died on 4 September 1538 at the age of about 75 years. Joan's burial took place on 9 September; she was one of the last people buried in the convent of Blackfriars. Her only son had died in 1532, without having had children by his two wives. In her last will, which was dated 30 August 1538, she left bequests to her cousin, Sir William Penyston, a niece, Bridget Walsh, her nephew, Lord Vaux, and Maud, her lady fool.

== Sources ==
- Hester W. Chapman, The Thistle and the Rose, Coward, McCann and Geoghegan, New York, 1969
