= The Phoenician Scheme (soundtrack) =

The Phoenician Scheme (Original Soundtrack)

Soundtrack album by various artists
- Released: May 30, 2025
- Studios: Holy Cross Church, Bearsted, Kent; Angel Recording Studios, London; Scotland’s Studio, Glasgow
- Genres: Film soundtrack; classical; orchestral; jazz
- Length: 44:31
- Label: ABKCO
- Producers: Wes Anderson; Randall Poster

Alexandre Desplat chronology
Unstoppable (2024)	The Phoenician Scheme (2025)	Jurassic World Rebirth (2025)

The Phoenician Scheme (Original Soundtrack) is the soundtrack album to the 2025 film The Phoenician Scheme directed by Wes Anderson. The film score is composed by Alexandre Desplat, and its soundtrack accompanied seven cues from his score with the remainder of them consisting of classical pieces composed by Igor Stravinsky, Ludwig van Beethoven and Johann Sebastian Bach amongst others; it was produced by Anderson along with his usual music supervisor Randall Poster. The album was released through ABKCO Records on May 30, 2025, and a vinyl edition set for release on July 11, 2025.

== Development ==
Frequent Anderson collaborator Alexandre Desplat worked on the score, as with another collaborator of the director, Randall Poster, also worked as the music supervisor and compiled and produced the soundtrack. Desplat's score incorporates the compositions of Igor Stravinsky, with a piece from his ballet The Firebird (1910) served as the "seed of the score" with a short melody which he twisted and expanded, to create a leitmotif serving as the film's musical anchor. On playing the piece, Desplat "thought about what Stravinsky had done, and tried to stay in Stravinsky’s world". Variations of that piece play over the transition cards, that indicates the events happening throughout the film.

Besides "The Firebird", the film also featured several works by the composer, including "Apotheosis" from Apollo amongst others, along with other works from Johann Sebastian Bach and Ludwig van Beethoven, along with jazz arrangements by Gene Krupa, Gerry Mulligan and Glenn Miller. Desplat aimed to "slalom around" these pieces while writing the score, as "there are too many things happening, and I just can’t musically link them [...] So I have to avoid them and let them play, and then find a flourish of mine — and another. These songs, these pieces, keep going along, and I just jump around." Desplat pointed that the only music the characters hear comes directly from tracks by other artists, which were played through radios, bands and turntables which were considered diegetic music. The non-diegetic music, which was the score, had to be connected with the diegetic music which goes in and out the image. Despite the film's ensemble cast, he did not want to compose music for the individual characters, instead crafted melodies that enriched the film's atmosphere that served as "a Rubik's Cube to give colors to every character". Desplat used a toolbox—consisted of glockenspiel, the choir, the mandolin, the banjo, recorders—which he had since their maiden association with Fantastic Mr. Fox (2009) and used the piano and drums from that toolbox to provide the musical palette for the score.

== Reception ==
Amy Nicholson of Los Angeles Times called it a "thrilling ticking time bomb of a score". David Ehrlich of IndieWire described it as "breezy". Tim Grierson of Screen International called it a "lilting orchestral score, supplemented by selections from Stravinsky and Beethoven". Peter Debruge of Variety noted that Desplat's score infuses "a dose of Lalo Schifrin-esque suspense". Jason Gorber of Paste wrote "Composer Alexandre Desplat adds in another dose of Francophilic exuberance". Siddhant Adlakha of Inverse wrote "Despite Alexandre Desplat's propulsive score in the vein of The French Dispatch, the images here never quite feel as exciting as the music." Robert Kojder of Flickering Myth called Desplat's score "a combination of propulsive thrust and farcical silliness". Tara Brady of The Irish Times wrote "Alexandre Desplat’s effective score sounds awfully like the one before."

== Track listing ==
No.	Title	Artist(s)	Length
1.	"Airplane Crash #1"	Alexandre Desplat	3:54
2.	"Stravinsky: Apollon musagète (1947 Version) / Second Tableau"	Igor Stravinsky; RCA Victor Symphony Orchestra	3:47
3.	"A.Z.K Land & Sea"	Alexandre Desplat	0:36
4.	"Palazzo Korda"	Alexandre Desplat	4:12
5.	"Beethoven: Piano Sonata No. 2 in A Op. 2 IV Rondo"	Ludwig van Beethoven; Robert Corben	1:58
6.	"Stravinsky: Petrouchka, 1947 Version: "Tableau 1, The Shrovetide Fair""	Igor Stravinsky; Columbia Symphony Orchestra	5:10
7.	"The Gap Explodes"	Alexandre Desplat	1:31
8.	"The Trans-Mountain Locomotive Tunnel"	Alexandre Desplat	1:36
9.	"Drum Boogie"	Gene Krupa	3:10
10.	"Mud Bug"	Fuasi Abdul-Khaliq Sextet	1:22
11.	"The Jungle Unit of the Intercontinental Radical Freedom Militia Corps"	Alexandre Desplat	2:02
12.	"J. S. Bach: Herz und Mund und Tat und Leben, Cantata BWV 147 / Pt. 2: Jesus bleibet meine Freude (Chorale)"	Johann Sebastian Bach; Karl Richter; Münchener Bach-Chor; Münchener Bach-Orchester	3:31
13.	"Hach Baregel"	Ahuva Tsadok; Nachum Nardi	2:31
14.	"Heaven #5 (Dost Thou Not Fear God)"	Alexandre Desplat	0:58
15.	"A String of Pearls"	Glenn Miller and his Orchestra	3:16
16.	"Mussorgsky: Pictures at an Exhibition (Orch. Ravel) (Modeste Moussorgski): IX. The Hut on Fowl's Legs "Baba-Yaga" (Recorded 1966)"	Modest Mussorgsky; Berlin Philharmonic; Herbert von Karajan	1:52
17.	"Stravinsky: L'Oiseau de Feu (The Firebird) "Introduction"/ "Le Jardin enchanté de Kachtchei"/"Disparition du palais et des sortilèges de Kachtchei, animation des chevaliers pétrifiés, allégresse générale""	Igor Stravinsky	3:05
Total length:			44:31

== Personnel credits ==
Credits adapted from liner notes:

- Original music composed by: Alexandre Desplat
- Music supervisor: Randall Poster
- Soundtrack producer: Wes Anderson, Randall Poster
- Recorded at: Holy Cross Church (Bearsted, Kent), Angel Recording Studios (London), Scotland's Studio, (Glasgow)
- Score mixer: Robin Baynton
- Senior engineer: Simon Rhodes
- Recordist and engineer: Christopher Parker
- Assistant engineer: Freddie Light
- Music editor: Simon Rhodes, Graeme Stewart
- Music coordinator: Meghan Currier
- Score preparation and additional music programming: Bill Newlin
- Music licensing: Jessica Dolinger

London Symphony Orchestra

- Orchestrator and conductor: Conrad Pope
- Orchestra contractors: Amy Stewart and Susie Gillis/Isobel Griffiths
- Librarian: Andrew Green/Global Music Service
- Concertmaster: Thomas Bowes
- Bass clarinet: Jon Carnac
- Bass trombone: Pete North
- Bassoons: Sarah Burnett, Helen Storey, Rachel Simms
- Celli: Tim Gill, James Douglas, Tony Woollard, Rachael Lander, Sophie Harris, Ashok Klouda, David Lale, Colin Alexander
- Contrabass clarinet: David Fuest
- Contrabassoon: Rachel Simms
- Double basses: Dominic Worsley, Beverley Jones, Steve Mair. Alice Kent. Steve Rossell, Ben Griffiths
- Drum kits: Paul Clarvis
- Flute: Rowland Sutherland
- French horns: John Ryan, John Thurgood, Corinne Bailey, Zoe Tweed
- Harp: Camilla Pay
- Percussion: Frank Ricotti, Paul Clarvis
- Piano, celeste and harpsichord: Simon Chamberlain
- Timpani: Tristan Fry
- Trumpet: Christian Barraclough
- Tuba: David Kendall
- Upright bass: Chris Hill
- Violas: Edward Vanderspar Emma Owens, Ann Beilby, Martin Humbey, Fiona Bonds, Rebecca Carrington
- Violins: Thomas Bowes, Max Baillie, Eleanor Mathieson, Ian Humphries, Raja Halder, Oli Langford, Emil Chakalov, Lorraine McAslan, Marianne Haynes, Thomas Kemp, Oscar Perks, Fiona Brett, Harriet Davies, Jenny Sacha

Scottish Digital Arts Orchestra

- Orchestra contractors: Paul Talkington and Ewen McKay
- Orchestra leader: Lena Zeliszewska
- Pro-tools operator: Marc McCouig
- Studio manager: Hedd Morfett-Jones
- Studio assistant: Sam McErlean
- Cello: Pei-Jee Ng
- Celeste: Judith Keaney
- Double bass: Michael Rae
- Harpsichords: Michael Bawtree, Michael Barnett
- Harps: Sharron Griffiths, Teresa Barros Pereira Romão
- Piano: Lynda Cochrane
- Viola: Tom Dunn
- Violin: Emily Davis

London Voices

- Choirmaster: Ben Parry
- Baritone singers: Benjamin Bevan, Ken Burton, Michael Dore, Edward Randell, Peter Snipp

== Release history ==
Release dates and formats for The Phoenician Scheme (Original Soundtrack)Release history and formats for Asteroid City (Original Soundtrack)
Region	Date	Format(s)	Label(s)	Ref.
Various	May 30, 2025	Digital download; streaming	ABKCO	
Various	July 11, 2025	Vinyl	ABKCO	
