= Bufkin =

Bufkin can refer to:

- Kobe Bufkin (born 2003), an American basketball player
- Levin Bufkin (c. 1533 – 1617), an English landowner and politician
- Bufkin (Fables), a fictional winged monkey in the Fables comic book series
