= Caring, Kent =

Village in Kent, England

Coordinates: 51°15′27″N 0°35′11″E

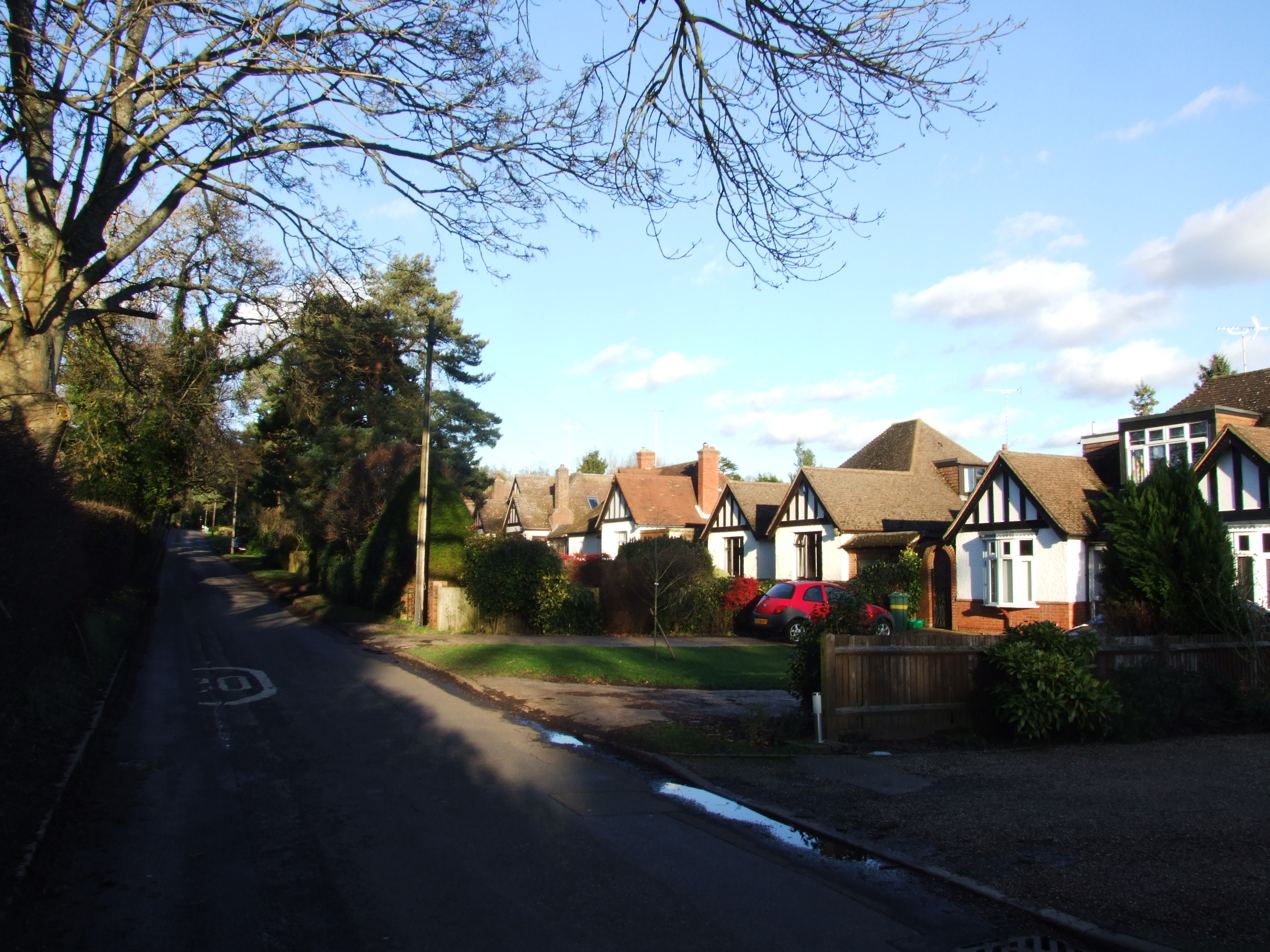
Caring Lane

Caring is a settlement south of Bearsted, near the town of Maidstone in Kent, England. It is located amid several farms on the River Len, a tributary of the Medway. The population of the settlement is included in the Thurnham civil parish.

Caring Wood is a private family home designed by architects James Macdonald Wright and Niall Maxwell. In 2017 the house won an RIBA National Award and the RIBA House of the Year.
