= KIG =

KIG may refer to either one of these things:

- Kig (software), a geometry software
- Kent International Gateway, a proposed rail-freight interchange in Kent, England
- ISO 639:kig or Kimaghama, a language spoken on Yos Sudarso Island in Papua province, Indonesia
- Kigurumi, a type of cosplay

== See also ==
- Keig, a village in Aberdeenshire, Scotland
