= Robert Fludd =

English mathematician and astrologer (1574–1637)

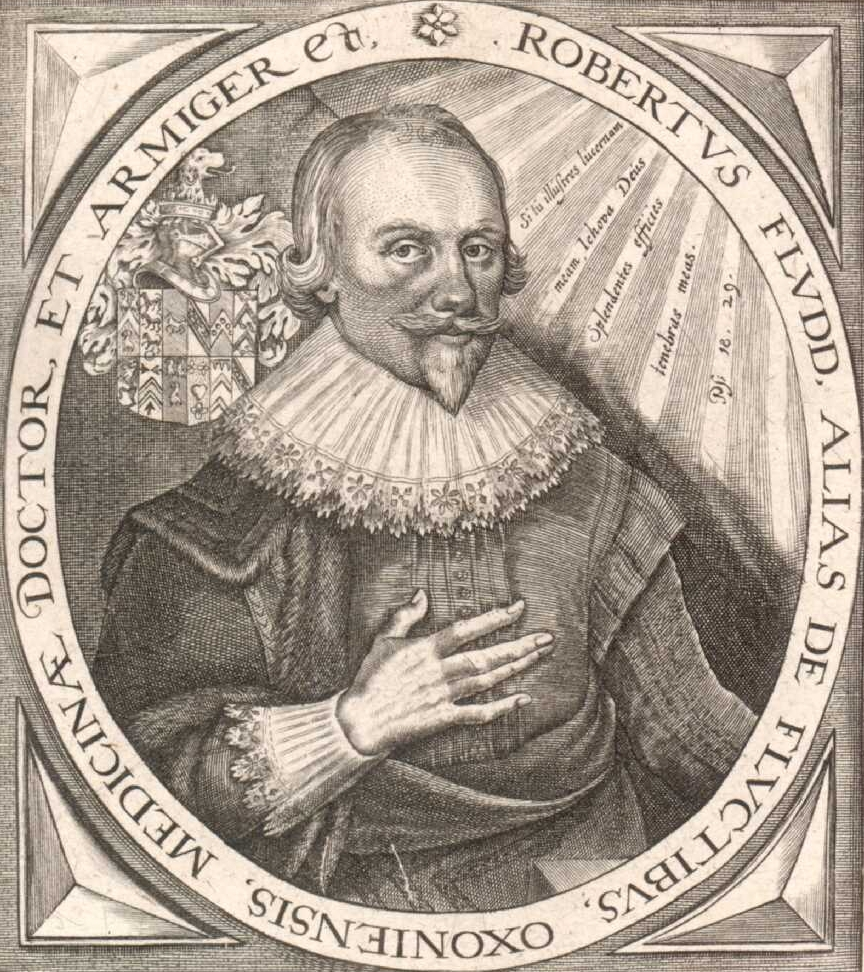
- Born: 17 January 1574; Milgate House, Bearsted, Kent, England
- Died: 8 September 1637 (aged 63); London, England
- Occupations: Physician, astrologer

Robert Fludd, also known as Robertus de Fluctibus (17 January 1574 – 8 September 1637), was a prominent English Paracelsian physician with both scientific and occult interests. He is remembered as an astrologer, mathematician, cosmologist, Qabalist, and Rosicrucian.

Fludd is best known for his compilations in occult philosophy. He had a celebrated exchange of views with Johannes Kepler concerning the scientific and hermetic approaches to knowledge.

== Early life ==
He was born at Milgate House, Bearsted, Kent, on 17 January 1573/4. He was the son of Sir Thomas Fludd, a high-ranking governmental official (Queen Elizabeth I's treasurer for war in Europe), and Member of Parliament. His mother was Elizabeth Andrews Fludd. A collage of 12 Coats of Arms of Fludd ancestors are shown in the painting above his right shoulder. His paternal arms goes back to Rhirid Flaidd whose name originates from Welsh meaning bloody or red wolf.

== Education ==
He entered St John's College, Oxford as a commoner in 1591, graduating with a B.A. in 1597 and an M.A. in 1598. St John's College, Oxford was one of the few in England with any provision for Fellowship (medicine); William Huffman suggests that the presence of a Medical Fellow at St John's College, Oxford influenced Fludd's interest in studying medicine. During Fludd's time at St John's College, the Medical Fellow in residence was Matthew Gwinne; Gwinne had previously produced a tract indicating that, while he practiced Galenic medicine, he was also familiar with the main Paracelsian medical work. Fludd may have encountered Gwinne, or his writing, during his time at Oxford, providing an additional influence for his later medical philosophy and practice.

== Career ==
Between 1598 and 1604, following his graduation, Fludd studied medicine, chemistry and hermeticism on the European mainland. His itinerary is not known in detail. On his own account he spent a winter in the Pyrenees studying theurgy (the practice of rituals) with the Jesuits. Furthermore, he indicated that he travelled throughout Spain, Italy and Germany following his time in France.

Upon returning to England in 1604, Fludd matriculated to Christ Church, Oxford. He intended to take a degree in medicine. The main requirements to obtain this, at the time, included demonstrating that he (the supplicant) had read and understood the required medical texts— primarily those by Galen and Hippocrates. Fludd defended three theses based on these texts, and on 14 May 1605, he made his supplication. He graduated with his M.B. and M.D. on 16 May 1605.

After graduating from Christ Church, Fludd moved to London, settled in Fenchurch Street, and made repeated attempts to enter the College of Physicians. Fludd encountered problems with the College examiners, both because of his unconcealed contempt for traditional medical authorities (he had adopted the views of Paracelsus), and because of his attitude to authority—especially those of the ancients like Galen. After at least six failures, he was admitted in September 1609. He became a prosperous London doctor, serving as Censor of the College four times (1618, 1627, 1633, and 1634). He also participated in an inspection of the London apothecaries put on by the College in 1614, and helped to author the Pharmacopoeia Londinensis in 1618—a directory of standardized pharmaceutical preparations given by the London College of Physicians. He became such an established figure within the College that he was included in seventeenth-century critiques of the college, including those by Nicholas Culpepper and Peter Coles.

Subsequently, both his career and his standing in the College took a turn for the better. He was on good terms with Sir William Paddy. Fludd was one of the first to support in print the theory of the circulation of the blood of the college's William Harvey. To what extent Fludd may have actually influenced Harvey is still debated, in the context that Harvey's discovery is hard to date precisely. The term "circulation" was ambiguous at that time.

== Occult interest ==
While he followed Paracelsus in his medical views rather than the ancient authorities, he was also a believer that real wisdom was to be found in the writings of natural magicians. His view of these mystical authorities was inclined towards the great mathematicians, and he believed, like Pythagoras and his followers, that numbers contained access to great hidden secrets. Certainty in religion could be discovered only through serious study of numbers and ratios. This view later brought Fludd into conflict with Johannes Kepler.

== Mystical theory of nature ==
=== Tripartite division of matter ===
Much of Fludd's writing, and his pathology of disease, centered around the sympathies found in nature between man, the terrestrial Earth, and the divine. While Paracelsian in nature, Fludd's own theory on the origin of all things posited that, instead of the Tria Prima, all species and things stemmed from first, dark Chaos, then divine Light which acted upon the Chaos, which finally brought forth the waters. This last element was also called the Spirit of the Lord, and it made up the passive matter of all other substances, including all secondary elements and the four qualities of the ancients. Moreover, the Fluddean tripartite theory concluded that Paracelsus' own conception of the three primary principles—Sulphur, Salt and Mercury—eventually derived from Chaos and Light interacting to create variations of the waters, or Spirit.

The Trinitarian division is important in that it reflects a mystical framework for biology. Fludd was heavily reliant on scripture; in the Bible, the number three represented the principium formarum, or the original form. Furthermore, it was the number of the Holy Trinity. Thus, the number three formed the perfect body, paralleling the Trinity. This allowed man and Earth to approach the infinity of God, and created a universality in sympathy and composition between all things.

=== Macrocosm–microcosm relationship ===
Fludd's application of his mystically inclined tripartite theory to his philosophies of medicine and science was best illustrated through his conception of the Macrocosm and microcosm relationship. The divine light (the second of Fludd's primary principles) was the "active agent" responsible for creation. This informed the development of the world and the Sun, respectively. Fludd concluded, from a reading of Psalm 19:4—"In them hath he set a tabernacle for the sun"—that the Spirit of the Lord was contained literally within the Sun, placing it central to Fludd's model of the macrocosm. As the Sun was to the Earth, so was the heart to mankind. The Sun conveyed Spirit to the Earth through its rays, which circulated in and about the Earth giving it life. Likewise, the blood of man carried the Spirit of the Lord (the same Spirit provided by the Sun), and circulated through the body of man. This was an application of the sympathies and parallels provided to all of God's Creation by Fludd's tripartite theory of matter.

The blood was central to Fludd's conception of the relationship between the microcosm and macrocosm; the blood and the Spirit it circulated interacted directly with the Spirit conveyed to the macrocosm. The macrocosmal Spirit, carried by the Sun, was influenced by astral bodies and changed in composition through such influence. Comparatively, the astral influences on the macrocosmal Spirit could be transported to the microcosmal Spirit in the blood by the active commerce assumed between the macrocosm and the microcosm. Fludd extended this interaction to his conception of disease: the movement of Spirit between the macrocosm and microcosm could be corrupted and invade the microcosm as disease. Like Paracelsus, Fludd conceived of disease as an external invader, rather than a complexional imbalance.

== Death ==
Fludd died on 8 September 1637 in London. He was buried in Holy Cross Church, Bearsted.

== Controversial works ==
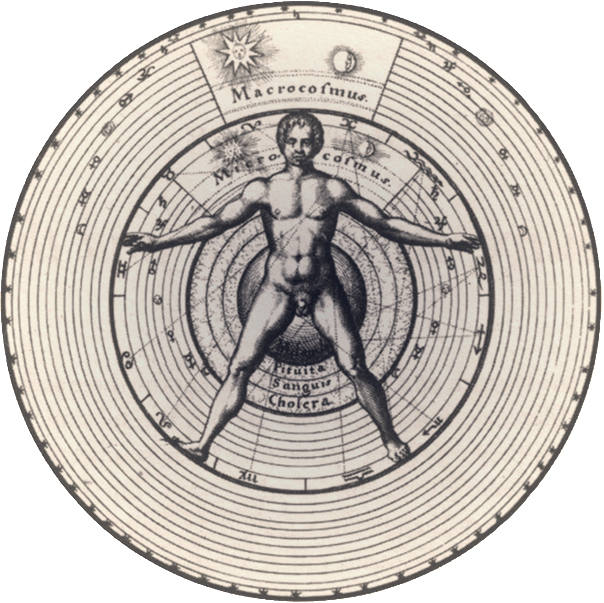
Fludd's illustration of man the microcosm within the universal macrocosm

Fludd's works are mainly controversial. In succession he defended the Rosicrucians against Andreas Libavius, debated with Kepler, argued against French natural philosophers including Gassendi, and engaged in the discussion of the weapon-salve.

=== Defence of Rosicrucianism ===
Fludd was not a member of the Rosicrucians, as often alleged, but he defended their thoughts as expressed in numerous manifestos and pamphlets. He produced a quick work, the Apologia Compendiaria, against the claims of Libavius that the Rosicrucians indulged in heresy, diabolical magic and sedition, made in his Analysis confessionis Fraternitatis de Rosea Cruce (Analysis of the Confession of the Rosy Cross) of 1615. Fludd returned to the subject at greater length, the following year.

- Apologia Compendiaria, Fraternitatem de Rosea Cruce suspicionis … maculis aspersam, veritatis quasi Fluctibus abluens, &c., Leyden, 1616. Against Libavius.
- Tractatus Apologeticus integritatem Societatis de Rosea Cruce defendens, &c., Leyden, 1617.
- Tractatus Theologo-philosophicus, &c., Oppenheim, 1617. The date is given in a chronogram. This treatise "a Rudolfo Otreb Britanno" (where Rudolf Otreb is an anagram of Robert Floud) is dedicated to the Rosicrucian Fraternity. It consists of three books, De Vita, De Morte, and De Resurrectione. In the third book Fludd contends that those filled with the spirit of Christ may rise before his second coming.

It is now seriously doubted that any formal organisation identifiable as the "Brothers of the Rose Cross" (Rosicrucians) ever actually existed in any extant form. The theological and philosophical claims circulating under this name appear, to these outsiders, to have been more an intellectual fashion that swept Europe at the time of the Counter Reformation. These thinkers suppose that in claiming to be part of a secret cult, scholars of alchemy, the occult, and Hermetic mysticism, merely sought that additional prestige by being able to promote their views while claiming exclusive adherence to some revolutionary pan-European secret society. By this logic, some suppose the society itself to never have existed.

Between 1607 and 1616, two anonymous Rosicrucian manifestos were published by some anonymous person or group, first in Germany and later throughout Europe. These were the Fama Fraternitatis, (The Fame of the Brotherhood of RC), and the Confessio Fraternitatis, (The Confession of the Brotherhood of RC). The first manifesto was influenced by the work of the respected hermetic philosopher Heinrich Khunrath, of Hamburg, author of the Amphitheatrum Sapientiae Aeternae (1609) who himself had borrowed generously from the work of John Dee. It referred favourably to the role played by the Illuminati and it featured a convoluted manufactured history dating back to archaic mysteries of the Middle East, with references to the Kabala and the Persian Magi.

The second manifesto had decidedly anti-Catholic views which were popular at the time of the Counter Reformation. These manifestos were re-issued several times, and were both supported and countered by numerous pamphlets from anonymous authors: about 400 manuscripts and books were published on the subject between 1614 and 1620. The peak of the "Rosicrucianism furore" came in 1622 with mysterious posters appearing on the walls of Paris, and occult philosophers such as Michael Maier, Robert Fludd and Thomas Vaughan interested themselves in the Rosicrucian world view. Others intellectuals and authors later claimed to have published Rosicrucian documents in order to ridicule their views. The furore faded out and the Rosicrucians disappeared from public life until 1710 when the secret cult appears to have been revived as a formal organisation.

It is claimed that the work of John Amos Comenius and Samuel Hartlib on early education in England were strongly influenced by Rosicrucian ideas, but this has not been proven, and it appears unlikely except in the similarity in their anti-Catholic views and emphasis on science education. Rosicrucianism is also said to have been influential at the time when operative Masonry (a guild of artisans) was being transformed to speculative masonry—Freemasonry—which was a social fraternity, that also originally promoted the scientific and educative view of Comenius, Hartlib, Isaac Newton and Francis Bacon.

Rosicrucian literature became the sandbox of theosophists, and charlatans, who claimed to be connected with the mysterious Brotherhood. Robert Fludd led the battle. It is said by some that he was "the great English mystical philosopher of the seventeenth century, a man of immense erudition, of exalted mind, and, to judge by his writings, of extreme personal sanctity".

It has also been said that what Fludd did was to liberate occultism, both from traditional Aristotelian philosophy, and from the coming (Cartesian) philosophy of his time.

=== Against Kepler ===
Johannes Kepler criticised Fludd's theory of cosmic harmony in an appendix to his Harmonice Mundi (1619).

- Veritatis Proscenium Frankfort, 1621. Reply to Kepler. In it Fludd argued from a Platonist point of view; and he claims that the hermetic or "chemical" approach is deeper than the mathematical.
- Monochordon Mundi Symphoniacum Frankfort, 1622. Reply to Kepler's Mathematice, 1622.
- Anatomiæ Amphitheatrum, Frankfort, 1623. Includes reprint of the Monochordon.

=== Against the natural philosophers ===
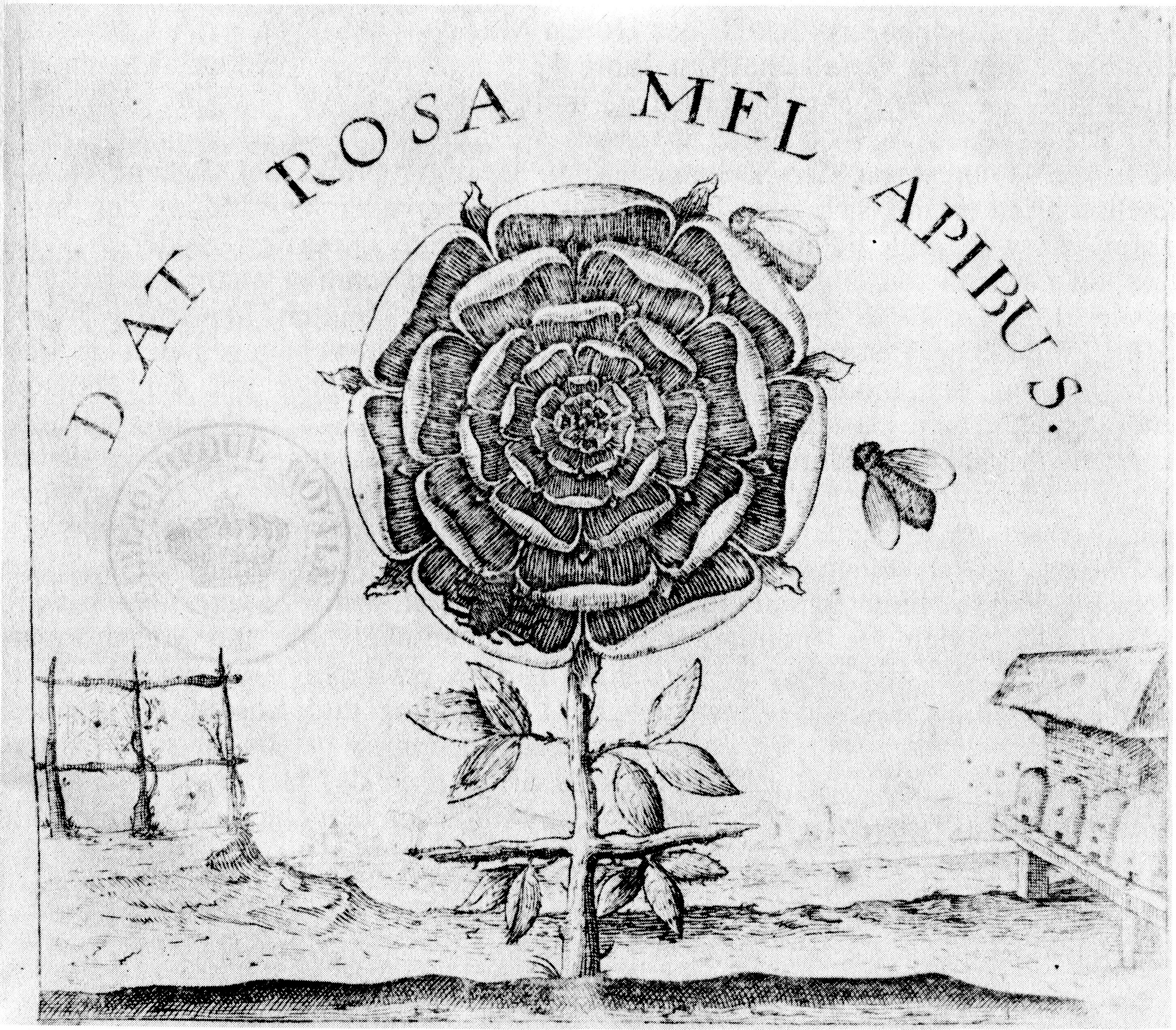
Titlepage of the Summum Bonum under the name of Joachim Frizius

According to Brian Copenhaver, "Kepler accused Fludd of being a theosophist, and Kepler was right". Fludd was well-read in the tradition coming through Francesco Giorgi. Marin Mersenne attacked him in Quæstiones Celebres in Genesim (1623).

- Sophiæ cum Moria Certamen, Frankfort, 1629. Reply to Mersenne.
- Summum Bonum, Frankfort, 1629. Under the name Joachim Frizius, this was a further reply to Mersenne, who had accused Fludd of magic.

Pierre Gassendi took up the controversy in an Examen Philosophiæ Fluddanæ (1630). This was at Mersenne's request. Gassendi attacked Fludd's neo-Platonic position. He rejected the syncretic move that placed alchemy, cabbala and Christian religion on the same footing; and Fludd's anima mundi. Further he dismissed Fludd's biblical exegesis.

Fludd also wrote against The Tillage of Light (1623) of Patrick Scot; Scot like Mersenne found the large claims of hermetic alchemy to be objectionable. Fludd defended alchemy against the criticisms of Scot, who took it to be merely allegorical. This work, Truth's Golden Harrow, remained in manuscript.

=== The weapon-salve controversy ===
- "Doctor Fludds Answer vnto M. Foster, or, The Sqvesing of Parson Fosters Sponge", &c., London, 1631, (defence of weapon-salve, against the Hoplocrisma-Spongus, 1631, of William Foster, of Hedgerley, Buckinghamshire); an edition in Latin, "Responsum ad Hoplocrisma-Spongum", &c., Gouda, 1638.

The idea that certain parallel actions could be initiated and linked by 'sympathetic' mysterious forces was widespread at this time, probably arising mainly from the actions of the magnet, shown by William Gilbert to always point towards some point in the northern sky. The idea owed a lot of the older Aristotelian and neo-Platonic views about soul-like forces.

"The particulars of the foresaid Proposition are easily proved and maintained by such ocular demonstrations, as may be produced from the vertuous operation of the mineral Load-stone, unto the which we may rightly compare all magneticall bodies, with their actions, because they have their denominations from the mineral magnet, and therefore this weapon-salve is tearmed by some men, Unguentum magneticum, and the cure is also called Magneticall." -Robert Fludd, Mosaicall Philosophy Grounded upon the Essentiall Truth or Eternall Sapience

== Cosmology and other works ==
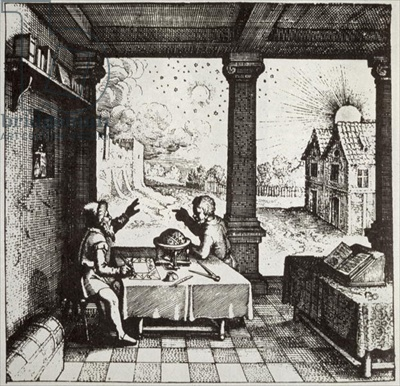
"An Astrologer Casting a Horoscope", from Robert Fludd's Utriusque Cosmi Historia, 1617

Fludd's philosophy is presented in Utriusque Cosmi, Maioris scilicet et Minoris, metaphysica, physica, atque technica Historia (The metaphysical, physical, and technical history of the two worlds, namely the greater and the lesser, published in Germany between 1617 and 1621); according to Frances Yates, his memory system (which she describes in detail in The Art of Memory, pp. 321–341) may reflect the layout of Shakespeare's Globe Theatre (The Art of Memory, Chapter XVI).

In 1618, Fludd wrote De Musica Mundana (Mundane Music) which described his theories of music, including his mundane (also known as "divine" or "celestial") monochord.

In 1630, Fludd proposed many perpetual motion machines. People were trying to patent variations of Fludd's machine in the 1870s. Fludd's machine worked by recirculation by means of a water wheel and Archimedean screw. The device pumps the water back into its own supply tank.

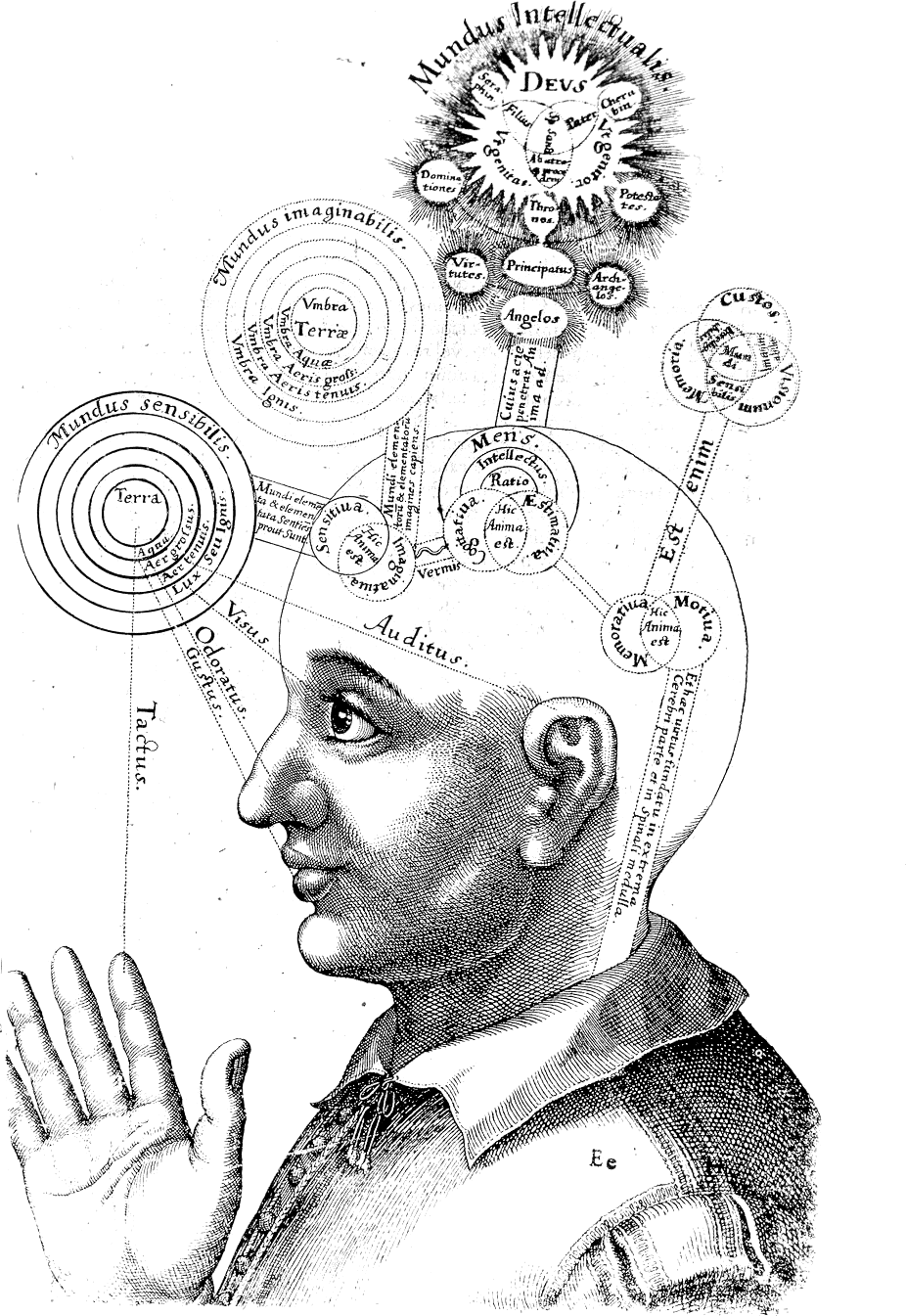
The spiritual brain, derived from cruder versions in predecessors, such as Albertus Magnus and Gregor Reisch.

His main works are:

- Utriusque Cosmi ... metaphysica, physica atque technica Historia, &c., Oppenheim and Frankfort, 1617–1624. (It has two dedications, first to the Deity, secondly to James I, and copperplates; it was to have been in two volumes, the first containing two treatises, the second three; it was completed as far as the first section of the second treatise of the second volume.)
- Philosophia Sacra et vere Christiana, &c., Frankfort, 1626; dedicated to John Williams.
- Medicina Catholica, &c., Frankfort, 1629–1631, in five parts; the plan included a second volume, not published.

Posthumous were:

- Philosophia Moysaica, &c., Gouda, 1638; an edition in English, Mosaicall Philosophy, &c., London, 1659.
- Religio Exculpata, &c. [Ratisbon], 1684 (Autore Alitophilo Religionis fluctibus dudum immerso, tandem … emerso; preface signed J. N. J.; assigned to Fludd).
- Tractatus de Geomantia, &c. (four books), included in Fasciculus Geomanticus, &c., Verona, 1687.

An unpublished manuscript, copied by an amanuensis, and headed Declaratio breuis, &c., is in the Royal manuscripts, British Library, 12 C. ii. Fludd's Opera consist of his folios, not reprinted, but collected and arranged in six volumes in 1638; appended is a Clavis Philosophiæ et Alchimiæ Fluddanæ, Frankfort, 1633.

== Reception ==
William T. Walker, reviewing two books on Fludd in The Sixteenth Century Journal (by Joscelyn Godwin, and William Huffman), writes that "Fludd relied on the Bible, the Cabbala, and the traditions of alchemy and astrology. Many of his contemporaries labelled Fludd a magician and condemned him for his sympathy for the occult." He cites Godwin's book as arguing that Fludd was part of the tradition of Christian esotericism that includes Origen and Meister Eckhart. He finds convincing the argument in Huffman's book that Fludd was not a Rosicrucian but was "a leading advocate of Renaissance Christian Neo-Platonism. Fludd's advocacy of an intellectual philosophy in decline has done much to assure his general neglect."

== See also ==
- Fludd – a 1989 novel by Hilary Mantel
