= Automotive Systems Developments =

- Industry: Automobiles
- Founded: 1983
- Founder: Bob Egginton
- Headquarters: Leeds, Kent

Automotive Systems Developments is a British manufacturer of automobiles.

== Company history ==
Bob Egginton founded the company in Leeds, Kent. He started producing automobiles and kits in 1983. The brand name is ASD. In total, more than 15 copies have been created so far. The company was also involved in Tripos R&D and CK Automotive, which also manufactured automobiles.

== Vehicles ==
The Minim was a mid-engine roadster. The basis was a steel chassis. A four-cylinder engine from the Mini powered the vehicle. Around six copies were made between 1984 and 1996.

The Hobo was released in 1987. It was similar to a Mini Moke and was also based on the Mini. Four copies were made by 1991.

Five replicas of the Aston Martin DBR1 based on the Jaguar XJ 6 and an unknown number of replicas of the Aston Martin DBR 2 were created, which were called Le Mans. ARA Racing from 2005 to 2006 and AS Motorsport since 2007 continued production under the ARA brand name.

The 250 corresponded to the Maserati 250 F. A four-cylinder engine from the Alfa Romeo Alfetta with a displacement of 2000 cm^{3} powered the vehicle.

There are also replicas of models from Ferrari and Mercedes-Benz.
