= William Foster (divine) =

English Clergyman

William Foster (born 1591), was an English clergyman and writer.

== Life ==
Foster was the son of William Foster of London, a barber-surgeon, and was born in November 1591. He entered Merchant Taylors' School in July 1607, and two years later (8 December 1609) was admitted of St John's College, Oxford, whence he graduated. Having taken holy orders he became chaplain (1628) to Robert Dormer, 1st Earl of Carnarvon, and soon afterwards rector of Hedgerley, Buckinghamshire. The date of his death is unclear.

== Works ==
He published a short treatise against the use of weapon-salve, entitled ‘Hoplo-Crisma Spongus, or a Sponge to wipe away the Weapon-Salve, wherein is proved that the Cure taken up among us by applying the Salve to the Weapon is magical and unlawful’ (1629 and 1641). It attracted attention through the answer made to it on behalf of the Rosicrucians by Dr Robert Fludd in 1631. Francis Osborne also attacked it in an essay ‘On such as condemn all they understand not a reason for’ (1659). The work acknowledges help from Johannes Roberti, a Flemish Jesuit.
