= River Len =

River in Kent, England

Len
- Kent rivers, showing the Len.

Location
- Country: England
- Region: Kent
- District: Maidstone

Physical characteristics
- Source: Bluebell Woods near Platt's Heath in Kent
  - location: Maidstone, England
- Mouth: joins River Medway
- Length: 16 km (9.9 mi)
- Discharge
  - location: Maidstone

Basin features
- Tributaries
  - left: The Fair Bourne, Leeds Stream
  - right: Selesbourne, Holingbourne Stream or Snagbrook, Bearsted Stream

The River Len is a river in Kent, England. It rises at a spring in Bluebell Woods to the southeast of the village centre of Lenham 0.6 miles (0.97 km) from the source of the River Great Stour; both rise on the Greensand Ridge. Its length is c10 miles (16 km). It enters the River Medway at Maidstone.

The river flows in a generally westerly direction. Today it runs parallel with the M20 motorway for much of the first part of its journey: it passes between the hamlet of Fairbourne Heath and Harrietsham; after Broomfield, the river becomes the lake adjoining Leeds Castle. The Len enters the town of Maidstone south of Bearsted and its waters become the lake in Mote Park; and it enters the River Medway c1.25 miles (2.01 km) beyond.

The river powered a number of watermills on itself and its tributaries in the parishes of Ulcombe, Leeds, Hollingbourne, Boxley and Maidstone.

== Watermills ==
The River Len powered a number of watermills, from source to mouth they were:-

=== Polhill (Holme) Mill, Harrietsham ===
TQ 861 523 51°14′22″N 0°40′01″E

A Domesday site, Holme Mill is recorded as Holemiln in 1254 and Holemille in 1332. In 1542 the manor of Polhill was in the ownership of John Stede. The mill passed to his son Thomas and then to his son Matthew. The mill was owned by Francis Colepeper Esq at the time of his death in 1590. It was worth 40s per annum then. In 1668 the mill was held by John Ruffen. It was then a fulling mill. Peter Theobalds was the tenant at the time of his death in 1690.

About this time the mill was converted to a corn mill. Stephen Weeks was the miller from 1700 to 1726, followed by his son John. He was followed by his son Thomas. Thomas Knight leased the mill for 21 years from 1779. He was followed by George Cronk and then John Brazier and Thomas Martin, who was the miller in 1824. In 1847 John Bunger was the miller, followed by William and Thomas Taylor in 1855. In 1895, the mill was in the occupation of Miller Bros, followed by Mrs Rhoda Vinson from 1907 to 1913. The mill had collapsed by the time Coles Finch visited it and was demolished in 1929, although the waterwheel and pentrough by Weeks of Maidstone survive.

=== Chegworth Mill, Ulcombe ===
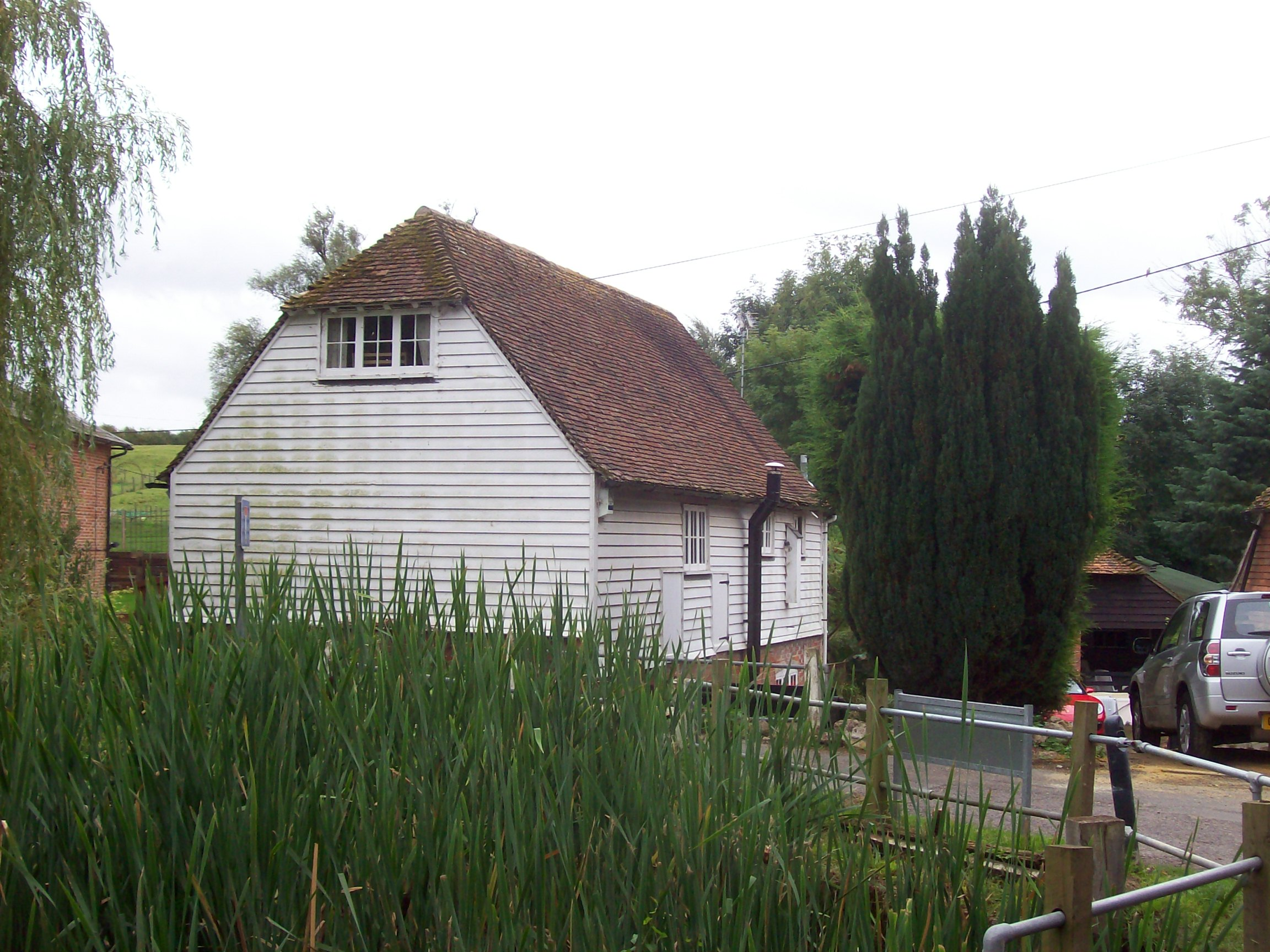
Chegworth Mill

TQ 849 527 51°14′36″N 0°39′00″E

Chegworth mill is probably not the Domesday mill recorded at Ulcombe. The first reference to Chegworth occurs in 1200. The first definite reference to this mill was in 1317, when the mill was held by John de Cheggeworth. John de Chageworth was recorded at the mill in 1324. The mill was in the ownership of Sir Cheney Culpeper in 1657. It was then known as the Lower Mill. The previous owners were Thomas Hatche and Richard Austen, who had recently sold the mill at that date. John Pecke was the miller. Seventeenth-century millers in Ulcombe include Willia Pettit (1612), Percival Austen (1669), Thomas Sylliborne (1673) and John Baker (1682). It is not known which mill each was at, there being two watermills and a windmill in Ulcombe during this period. William Taylor was the miller in the mid-nineteenth century. In 1702, John Feverstone was the miller.

The mill was known as Pendmill in 1745 when the miller was recorded as John Feverstour the Elder. John Feverstone the older was the miller in 1766, when the lease was renewed; Richard Tilbe was the owner at this time. Thomas Willett leased the mill in 1792 and in 1800 Chegworth Mill, otherwise Pendmill was mortgaged by Willett. The mill was recorded as Checqworth Mill on the 1801 Ordnance Survey map. John Taylor was the miller in 1847, followed by G Craddock in 1852, J Gilbert, William and Thomas Taylor in 1854, Mrs M Cradduck, J Gilbert and Thomas Taylor 1855 – 1861, Charles Wicks in 1874, Alfred Wick 1895 – 1907, and Frederick James Potter 1930 – 1934. The last miller was Ted Uren, who started at the mill in 1961, and took over from Harold Potter. The mill was house converted c.1990.

The present mill was a corn mill and worked until the late 1960s. It has an overshot waterwheel of 10 feet 10 inches (3.3 m) diameter and 7 feet 6 inches (2.3 m) wide, made by Weeks of Maidstone. The axle is cast iron and 7 1/2 inches (190 mm) square. The pit wheel is cast iron with 96 lignum vitae cogs. The cast-iron upright shaft carries a cast-iron wallower with 38 teeth and a cast-iron great spur wheel with 104 cogs. It powered three pairs of millstones. One pair are French Burr stones (by Hughes & Son of Dover and London) of 44 inches (1.1 m) diameter, one pair are Peak stones of 46 inches (1.2 m) diameter and the third pair have a Peak runner stone on a French Burr bedstone, both 42 inches (1.1 m) diameter. The crown wheel drove two layshafts, which powered various machines, including a "Ureka" winnower and an oat crusher by Ganz & Co., of Budapest, Hungary. A saw bench outside the mill was also driven by belts and pulleys. The sack hoist is driven from the top of the upright shaft.

=== The Mille, Broomfield ===
TQ 834 536 51°15′07″N 0°37′37″E

Possibly a Domesday site, the mill was marked on a map dated 1649. A 1748 map shows the watercourses but no mill. The head of water available was some 10 feet (3.0 m), indicating a breastshot or overshot waterwheel.

=== Le Mille, Broomfield ===
TQ 834 532 51°14′53″N 0°37′34″E

The first mention of this mill was in 1368 when a fulling mill had been erected by Thomas Burgeys of Smarden. In 1486 the mill was held by Thomas Bourghchier the Younger. The mill was marked on a map of Leeds Castle dated 1649. In 1748, the waterways and mill pond were marked on a map, but no building. The mill seems to have ceased work sometime after the 1660s, when John Rogers was recorded as a fuller in Leeds. The mill may have had a breastshot or overshot waterwheel.

=== Leeds Castle Mill, Broomfield ===
TQ 835 532 51°14′54″N 0°37′49″E

A mill was recorded at Broomfield in the Domesday book. This predated the building of a mill by either Robert de Crevecoeur or his son Hamo de Crevecoeur in 1100. Originally built as a corn mill, there is some evidence that it had been converted to a fulling mill by 1368. This being the work of Thomas Burgeys of Smarden. The surviving mill building dates from the early thirteenth century and fell out of use in the middle seventeenth century. The building was some 16 feet (4.9 m) wide, 42 feet (12.8 m) long and 35 feet (10.7 m) high. The waterwheel was driven from the lake to the castle.

The mill was located between the Outer Barbican and Inner Barbican and the breastshot waterwheel would have been some 10 feet (3.0 m) or 11 feet (3.4 m) diameter and 3 feet (0.9 m) wide. The remains of a pair of Peak millstones were recorded as lying in the wheel pit in 1967. The stones seemed to be of early nineteenth-century manufacture and it is not known whether they came from this mill of one of the other mills owned by the Leeds Castle estate.

=== Keepers Cottage mill, Broomfield ===
TQ 831 536 51°15′07″N 0°37′19″E

A possible mill site, a building was marked on a map of Leeds Castle dated 1748 on the island which lies above Keeper's Cottage. The site is probably not a Domesday site, and if a mill existed here it disappeared in the late Middle Ages.

=== Old (Boxley, Hollingbourne, Hurst, Mote Hole) Mill, Leeds ===
TQ 820 541 51°15′25″N 0°36′33″E

This mill stood on the parish boundary of Hollingbourne and Leeds. In 1654 the mill was recorded as a fulling mill in the occupation of John and William Dann. A William Dann, fuller, of Leeds is recorded as having been a bondsman at a wedding in 1640. The fulling mill had gone by 1723. In 1733, Sir Roger Meredith, Baronet, of Leeds Abbey leased land in Hollingbourne to James Whatman with permission to erect a new dwelling house and papermill. Whatman sub-leased part of the land to Richard Harris from 1733 to 1736, then William Quelch and John Terry from 1739 to 1741 and John Saunders from 1741 to 1748. He was followed by Henry French from 1749 to 1770. James Whatman Jr inherited the freehold in 1759 and occupied the mill until 1775. He was followed by Clement Taylor as occupier from 1776 to 1791, and by 1794 a Mr Calcraft had acquired the freehold. In 1795, Messrs Balston, Finch, Hollingworth & Co were owner occupiers. In 1824, Messrs Hollingworth, Finch and Thomas were the occupiers. In 1843, John Hollingworth, papermaker, was the occupier.

The mill was still a paper mill in 1847 but had been converted to a corn mill by 1852, when the miller was one of R Dawson, E Nye of H Nye (the other two millers being at Eyhorne and Manor mills, Hollingbourne). In 1854, Richard Ashbe and John Bunyar were millers at Mote Hole Mill. William Skinner was the miller in 1855. William Taylor was the miller at Old Mill in 1874. George Stephen Kingsnorth was miller at Mote Hole Mill in 1895, followed by the Medway Milling Co in 1907. In 1908, the mill was being used to grind cocoa beans. Edward Weller was the miller in 1913. The mill had probably ceased work by 1922 and was idle by 1928. The mill gearing had been jammed by a baulk of timber, jamming the machinery by that date. Old Mill was five storeys high. It had an overshot waterwheel of at least 12 feet (3.7 m) diameter and 7 feet (2.1 m) width. It drove six pairs of millstones by lineshaft. The machinery was removed during World War II and the mill demolished c. 1955.

=== Brandescombe (Buscombe, Fulling) Mill, Leeds ===
TQ 812 540 51°15′22″N 0°35′42″E

This mill was presented to the Priory of Leeds by Robert de Crevecoeur the Younger. The mill was also mentioned in the will of Daniel de Crevequer, who died in 1177. At that time it was a corn mill. Leeds priory was dissolved in 1539 and the mill was still in the ownership of the priory then. In 1628, Thomas Fludd and Ralphe Buffkin sold the mill to William Cage of Lincoln's Inn, Middlesex. By this time it was a fulling mill. Cage was still the owner in 1689, when the mill was in the occupation of William Tompkin and had previously been in the occupation of Bob Potter. Potter remained in occupation until at least 1707. Hasted noted the mill was still working in 1798 and Greenwood's map of 1822 marks the mill as Shilling Mill. The mill probably had a breastshot waterwheel as the head was not sufficient for an overshot wheel. Fulling Mill had ceased to be used as a mill by 1843, there being no entry in Bagshaw's Directory of that year. The surviving building is of fifteenth century date.

=== Thurnham (Ballard's) Mill ===
This was a Domesday mill, and stood some 200 yards (180 m) upstream of the present mill, on the south side of Milgate Park. In 1624 the mill was occupied by Edward Chambers. In 1635 the mill, late in the occupation of Matthew Chambers, being two corn mills and a fulling mill, were conveyed to William Cage. In 1685 Celia Cage, widow of Matthew, held the mills. Fulling having apparently been discontinued by this time. William Barber was the miller in the mid-eighteenth century, and Richard Ballard took the mill in 1777. Ballard was still in occupation in 1815, when the mill was marked as Ballard's Mill on a map of the new turnpike from Maidstone to Bearsted. The millpond was some 400 feet (120 m) long and the dam about 7 feet (2.1 m) high, indicating that the waterwheel was breastshot. Ballard's mill was demolished c.1828 and a new mill built downstream. A turbine was installed at the old mill site, and its remains were visible in the late 1960s.

=== Thurnham Mill ===
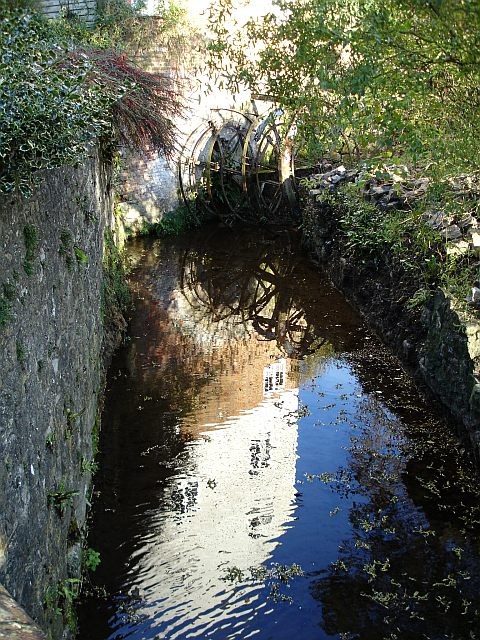
Thurnham Mill reflected in the water.

TQ 802 547 51°15′46″N 0°35′02″E

This mill was built by the Cage family in the late 1820s on a piece of land called Byfrance, part of the Milgate estate. The tail race from Ballard's Mill was extended some 200 yards (180 m) to get sufficient height to drive an overshot waterwheel of 9 feet (2.7 m) diameter and 10 feet (3.0 m) wide.

The waterwheel was carried on a cast-iron axle and drove a 7-foot-diameter (2.1 m) cast-iron pit wheel with wooden cogs. That drove the wallower on the upright shaft, then a 6-foot-diameter (1.8 m) cast-iron great spur wheel drove four pairs of millstones. There were two pairs of French Burr stones and two pairs of Peak stones. One pair of each type was 4 feet (1.2 m) diameter and the other pair of each type was 3 feet 6 inches (1.1 m) diameter. At the top of the upright shaft was a 5-foot-diameter (1.5 m) cast-iron crown wheel. The Blinkhorn family had a long association as millers at the mill, John Blinkhorn being the miller in 1825. J Blinkhorn was the miller in 1852 and John Blinkhorn in 1874.

A new waterwheel was fitted after World War I. Marshall Bros were the millers from 1930 to 1934. The mill was working until World War II when the axle to the waterwheel broke. Most of the machinery was then scrapped. The mill was sold for house conversion in 1986, at that time only the frame of the waterwheel and pit wheel survived, all other machinery having been removed.

=== Otham Mill ===
Also known as Bearsted Mill, this corn mill was built in 1837. It was still standing in 1939 and the overshot waterwheel had a width that exceeded its diameter.

=== Otham Paper Mill ===
Otham Paper Mill was originally built as a fulling mill in 1527. The machinery was to be made by millwright George Jenkyn of Cranbrook, Kent. The mill was to have two overshot waterwheels 7 feet 6 inches (2.3 m) in diameter. The contract was signed on 8 January 1527, with the mill to be completed by May Day. Total cost of the mill was £88 5s 3d. The mill had been converted to a paper mill by 1700. According to Maureen Green, Otham Mill was bought by Thomas Pine in the 1750s and remained in the Pine family until 1837.

By the 1830s Otham Paper Mill was occupied by the papermakers at Turkey Mill. A paper making machine was installed, but this was removed to Turkey Mill in 1859, when the mill was converted to house a two engine washer for cleaning and beating rags for use in the papermaking process. The mill was marked on the first 6" Ordnance Survey map.

=== Poll (Pole, Mote) Mill, Boxley ===
TQ 774 553 51°16′09″N 0°32′39″E

This was a fulling mill originally. It was known as Powle Mill in 1629. It was part of the manor of Newnham Court (owned by Sir John Astley), which had been in the ownership of Boxley Abbey. The mill was later converted to papermaking. John Swinnock was the tenant from 1708 to 1728, being followed by William Gill. He was followed by Joseph Cordwell, who was the tenant until 1756. The mill at this time being owned by the Earl of Aylesford. In 1756, the mill was let to Abraham Fearon, a watchmaker from Soho. Clement Taylor was the next tenant, until his death in 1776, followed by his son James as a yearly tenant. James Whatman Jr bought the mill in June 1785 and Poll Mill worked in conjunction with Turkey Mill from then on. The mill was demolished in 1836 in order to create the Lake at Mote Park, Maidstone.

=== Turkey Mill, Boxley ===
TQ 772 556 51°16′19″N 0°32′29″E

This mill was originally a fulling mill and is known to have been used as such between 1640 and 1671. It was at various times known as Overloppe Mill (1640) and Gill's Mill (1732). Overloppe Mill was sold for £493 by Simon Smythe of Tenterden to John Fletcher of Boxley in 1640. The mill passed to Richard Fletcher in 1657 and then to John Cripps by 1693. Thomas Tolhurst was the fuller from 1640 to 1675. The mill was converted from a fulling mill to a paper mill during the time John Cripps owned it.

The mill passed to Dorothy Cripps in 1695. She granted a 41-year lease to George Gill. The lease passed to his son William, who acquired the freehold of the mill from John and Christopher Cripps, the sons of John Cripps. Gill was declared bankrupt in 1731 and the mill passed to James Brooke, the chief mortgagee. Richard Harris was the tenant in 1736, acquiring the freehold in 1738. Harris demolished the old mill buildings and erected a new mill, but died in November 1739 before the work was completed.

The name Turkey Mill was first recorded in 1739. The mill passed to Ann Cripps, who married James Whatman in 1740. thus James Whatman acquired the mill, and it was here that he and his son developed 'wove' paper. Turkey Mill became the largest paper mill in the country. The mill was sold by James Whatman Jr in 1792 to Thomas, Robert and Finch Hollingworth of Maidstone for the substantial sum of £32,000. The Hollingworths were originally in partnership with William Balston, but he withdrew from the partnership in 1805 and set up a new paper mill at Springfield, Maidstone.

Ownership of the mill passed from Thomas Hollingworth through his sons and thence through their nieces until eventually Major William Pitt was the sole owner. On his death in 1976 Turkey Mill was bought by Wiggins Teape and closed down, thus ending over 280 years of continuous paper production at the mill, the longest by any paper mill in Great Britain.

Watermarks

The copyright of the 'J Whatman' imprint was transferred to William Balston in 1806 and to the production of Whatman paper at Turkey Mill. In 1859 the 'Turkey Mill' watermark was sold to William Balston's two sons at Springfield Mill, and thereafter paper produced at Turkey Mill was watermarked 'Original Turkey Mill', 'O.T.M.' or 'T & J Hollingworth'.

Uses of paper produced at Turkey Mill

The artist Thomas Gainsborough used paper produced at the mill for his drawings. He wrote in 1797 that it was worth 'a guinea a quire'. J. M. W. Turner also used Whatman paper and William Blake used it for four of his illustrated books. Napoleon wrote his will on Whatman paper and Queen Victoria used it for her personal correspondence. Turkey Mill notepaper was also used in the House of Commons library.

In the 1930s Soviet leaders used Whatman paper to publish their five-year plan for the future of the USSR and at the end of World War Two the peace treaty with Japan was written on Whatman paper.

=== Christian's Mill, Maidstone ===
This was a fulling mill. William Pertis was the miller in 1716, having been preceded by George Overy. Pertis sold the mill to William Gill in 1719. The mill had been demolished by 1735 and replaced by six houses known as "The Square". A now demolished cottage nearby was called Fulling Mill House and bore the date 1567.

=== Padsole (Lenworth) Mill, Maidstone ===
TQ 764 556 51°16′20″N 0°31′48″E

Possibly a Domesday site, this mill stood in Water Lane. A dispute over the building of a mill here reached the King's Court in 1313–4. The mill was one of two in Maidstone owned by Christ Church, Canterbury. A 21-year lease was granted by Archbishop Courtenay in 1385 to William Walbelton and Richard Haute. The mill was known as Poll Mill in 1449 (a fulling mill). In 1510 the miller was one of 22 tenants of the Archbishop of Canterbury who considered his rent was excessive and refused to pay. In 1548 it consisted of two wheat mills, two fulling mills, a malt-mill and two potchers. It was known as Paddes Fulling Mill in 1550 and Paddle le Myll in 1608.

In 1650, Padsole mill was owned by Sir William Culpeper. The mill was derelict by the end of the eighteenth century and subsequently demolished. The mill was rebuilt by James Smythe in 1795 as a paper mill. Smythe was in partnership with the Hollingworth brothers. They acquired the mill and sold it to John Wise and John Hayes in 1799. The mill was marked on Brown & Son's survey of Maidstone, 1821. The mill was demolished in 1874 and a new corn mill built nearby by William Taylor of Chegworth Mill.

The last mill building was a three-storey brick structure. Messrs Bradley, Taylor and Youngman were the millers in 1957, but the mill had ceased to work by water power by then. The building survived until the 1980s.

=== Church Mill, Maidstone ===
TQ 759 555 51°16′17″N 0°31′22″E

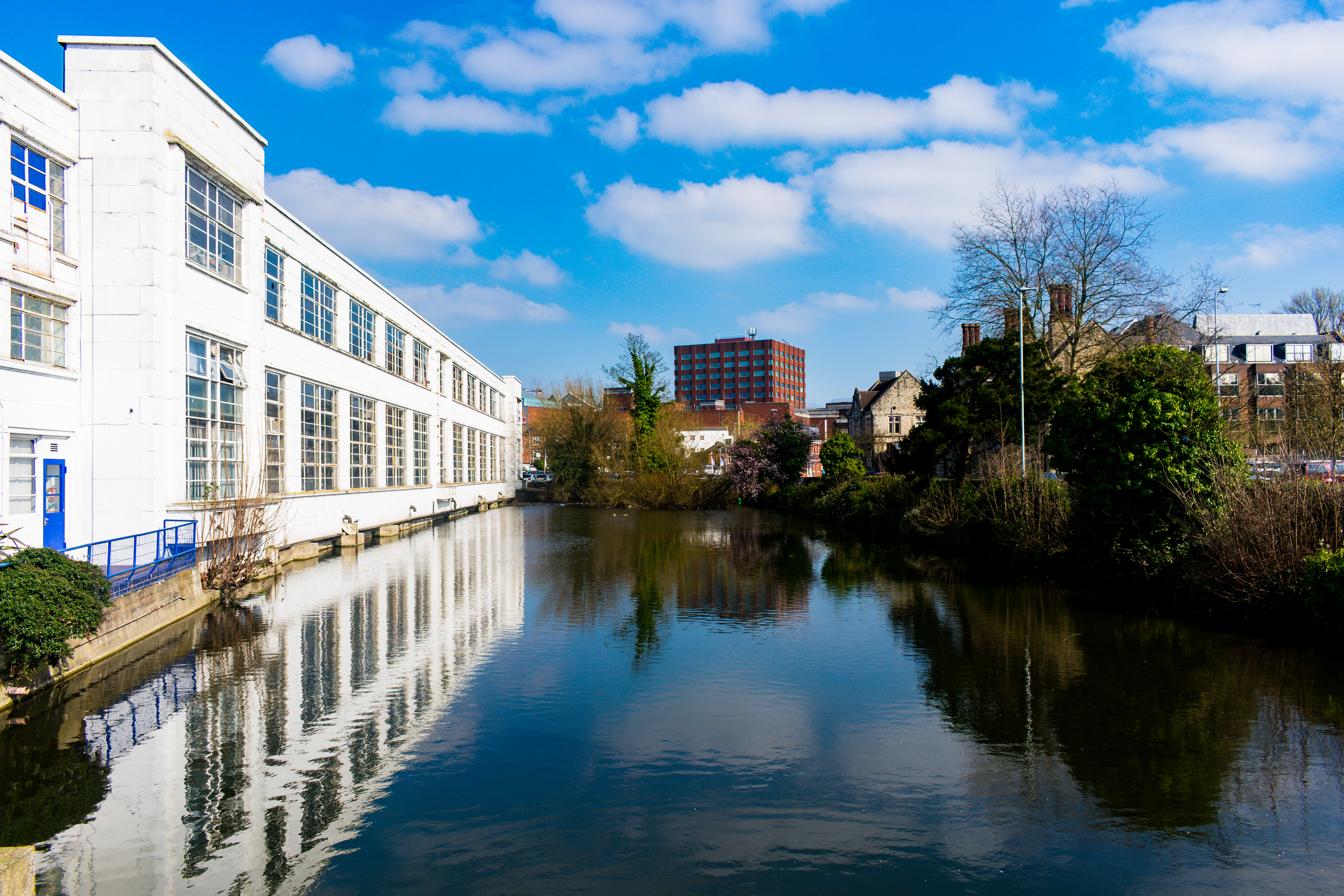
The mill pond, with the former Rootes showroom on the left.

Church mill was one of the two mills in Maidstone owned by Christ Church, Canterbury. It may be one of the five Domesday mills recorded in Maidstone. Church mill was standing in 1572. William Purtis/Purlis was the miller in 1752, renewing his lease on the mill in that year. An inventory at the time showed that Church mill had two pairs of French Burr millstones and one pair of Peak millstones. It was marked on Brown & Son's survey of Maidstone, 1821. The mill was demolished in 1903 as part of a road widening scheme. The millpond survives.

=== Little Church Mill, Maidstone ===
TQ 760 555 51°16′17″N 0°31′27″E This mill stood on the watercourse that was the bypass from Church Mill. William Purtis/Purlis was the miller in 1752, renewing his lease on the mill in that year. An inventory at the time showed that Little Church mill had one pair of French Burr millstones and four bolting mills. It was marked on Brown & Son's survey of Maidstone, 1821. The mill was demolished in the early 19th century.

== Tributaries ==
Two streams rise at Harrietsham and each powered a watermill in the village before joining the River Len.

The Hollingbourne Stream rises above the village and powered four watermills before joining the River Len.

A stream rises north of Bearsted and powered two watermills before joining the River Len.

A stream rises in Leeds and powered three watermills before joining the River Len.

== Watermills on the tributaries ==
=== Streams at Harrietsham ===
==== Selesbourne ====
This was a grinding (corn) mill.

==== The Fair Bourne ====
The Fair Bourne rises in a quarry above Fairbourne Court. It powered a watermill.

===== Fairbourne Mill, Harrietsham =====
TQ 866 517 51°14′02″N 0°40′26″E

This mill was probably a Domesday mill. The first definite reference to this mill was in 1580, when the rent was assessed at 9 hens, commuted to 2d. The mill was called Fulborne Mill in 1608. It was owned at that time by James I but sold by him shortly afterwards. Edward Hickmut was the occupier of the mill in 1694. In 1768, the mill was described as "two water corn mills under one roof". It was then in the occupation of Thomas Stiles. Alexander Bottle was the miller from 1782 to 1797. He rebuilt the mill in 1796, which date was to be seen on the mill. This was a corn mill with an overshot waterwheel driving two pairs of millstones, one pair of French Burrs and one pair of Peaks.

William Hudson was the miller from 1847 to 1855. Thomas Clark (1838–1929) was the miller through the second half of the nineteenth century, taking the mill c1861. He was the miller until the mill stopped working. The waterwheel was later replaced by a turbine. Milling at Fairbourne ceased in 1908. Although the waterwheel was never at a loss for water to supply it, it could only work one of the two pairs of millstones at any one time. The mill building remains, empty of machinery.

=== Hollingbourne Stream or Snagbrook ===
The Hollingbourne Stream rises at the foot of the North Downs, and flows for 1 1/4 miles (2.0 km) to the River Len. It powered four mills. Alternative names for the stream are the Snagbrook and the Snakebrook.

==== Manor Mill ====
TQ 843 552 51°15′58″N 0°38′24″E

A mill may have stood on this site since 980, when King Edelstane gave Holyngbourne to Christ Church, Canterbury, and almost certainly since Domesday. In 1591 the mill was in the occupation of William Huxeley. In 1718 the mill pond was recorded as having an area of 1A 2R 16P (69,696 square feet (6,475.0 m^{2})). Robert Fairfax had leased the mill in 1759. The lease of the mill was in the ownership of John Spencer Culpeper and passed to Francis Child in 1762.

In 1825, the mill pond was recorded as 1A 1R 1P (54,722 square feet (5,083.8 m^{2})). In 1839 the mill was leased by the Earl of Jersey. In 1868 the pond had decreased in size to 3R 13P (36,209 square feet (3,363.9 m^{2})). John Clark (1832–1873) was a miller here at one time. The mill and house were rebuilt in 1880 and the miller from this time until 1925 was a Mr. Wratten. The main axle of the watermill broke in 1925 thus bringing an end to the working life of the mill.

The mill had an overshot waterwheel 10 feet (3.0 m) diameter and some 3 feet (0.91 m) wide of composite construction and powered three pairs of millstones via a lineshaft. The mill building survives with its waterwheel but devoid of machinery.

==== Eyhorne Mill ====
TQ 835 546 51°15′39″N 0°37′52″E

This corn mill may have been owned by Edward Laws in 790. It was at work in 1839 when the owner was James Bunyard and the miller was John Symmonds. In 1855, the miller may have been John Adley. It last worked sometime between 1885 and 1898, when it was marked as disused on the Ordnance Survey map. The mill stood downstream of the bridge and on the east bank of the stream. The waterwheel was probably breastshot as the head was only some 6 feet (1.8 m) or 7 feet (2.1 m). The mill was disused by 1898.

==== Grove (Cotteram's, Old) Mill ====
TQ 835 545 51°15′36″N 0°37′44″E

This was probably a corn mill originally, later converted to a fulling mill. During the eighteenth and nineteenth centuries it was a paper mill. In 1803, Cotteram's Mill was being worked by Stroud and Newman and in 1839 Grove Mill was being worked by Edward and Charles Horsenails, papermakers. The mill was a corn mill by 1847. The mill was recorded as having been converted back to a paper mill in 1876 although John Charles Friday was the miller in 1882. The mill was working until at least 1885. The building was later demolished.

==== Park (New) Mill ====
TQ 835 542 51°15′25″N 0°37′41″E

This was probably a corn mill originally, later converted to a fulling mill. During the eighteenth and nineteenth centuries it was a paper mill. James Austen of Chatham insured a new-built paper mill at Hollingbourne in 1762. William Avery, papermaker, was the tenant in 1764. Robert Williams insured his utensils and stock in a paper mill at Hollingbourne in 1775. In 1816, Thomas Stroud and Daniel Denny Newman were master papermakers at New Mill. In 1847 this mill was producing pasteboard.

The mill was later known as Park Mill, being in the occupation of "The New Hollingbourne Mill Paper Mills Company Ltd.", this being post-1862, when the Companies Act established Limited Liability Companies. The mill was recorded as Hollingbourne Paper Mills in Bartholomew's Gazetteer of 1887. A paper making machine from this mill was sold to Messrs. Wiggins Teape in 1892. It was installed in Buckland Paper Mill, Dover. The mill was later demolished. The waterwheel was probably breastshot, and about 12 feet (3.7 m) diameter.

=== Leeds Stream ===
==== Le Nethertoune Mill, Leeds ====
TQ 823 534 51°15′02″N 0°36′48″E

This mill stood probably had a breastshot or undershot waterwheel as the head available would only have been some 4 feet (1.2 m). It was a fulling mill recorded as being "in ruins" in 1466.

==== Abbey Mill, Leeds ====
TQ 823 531 51°14′53″N 0°36′40″E

Probably a Domesday site and one of the five mills owned by the Townsmen of Leeds. Leeds Priory was surrendered in 1539 and in 1540 the King leased the site of Leeds Priory and all houses, mills etc. to Sir Anthony St Leger for 21 years. The St Leger family continued the lease until 1573 when it passed firstly to the Norden family and then to William Covert and later his son, William. In 1609, the estate was sold to Sir William Meredith, in whose family it remained until the eighteenth century. In 1789, and indenture between John Calcroft and Thomas William mentioned that the mill was formerly in the possession of Thomas Crisp.

George Blinkhorn was the miller from 1843 to 1874 and Alfred Blinkhorn was the miller from 1895 to 1922. The mill was marked on the first 6" OS map of Kent in 1865. It had a cast-iron overshot waterwheel 16 feet 8 inches (5.1 m) diameter and 3 feet 4 inches (1.0 m) wide by Weeks of Maidstone. The cast-iron pit wheel was 8 feet 6 inches (2.6 m) diameter with wooden cogs. The waterwheel drove three pairs of millstones via two lineshafts, each driven by a 2 feet (610 mm) diameter cast-iron gear. One shaft drove a single pair of 4-foot-diameter (1.2 m) French Burr millstones by a 5-foot-diameter (1.5 m) cast-iron face gear with wooden cogs and the other shaft drove two pairs of French Burr millstones by 5-foot-6-inch-diameter (1.7 m) cast-iron face gears with wooden cogs. One pair of stones was 48 inches (1.2 m) diameter and the second pair 40 inches (1.0 m) diameter. Both lineshafts were of oak, 12 inches (300 mm) square. The mill was derelict but intact in 1936 but partly demolished later, with only the ground floor remaining. Some machinery still remains in the mill.

==== Priory (North) Mill, Leeds ====
TQ 823 530 51°14′49″N 0°36′40″E

The mill was first recorded as belonging to James I in 1608, known then as North Mill. The site of this mill was recorded on a map of 1821. In 1834, only a few fragments of the mill walls remained. The head would have been around 5 feet (1.5 m), suggesting a breastshot waterwheel.

=== Stream at Bearsted ===
A stream rises above Bearsted. It powered two mills.

==== Aldington Mill, Thurnham ====
TQ 812 573 51°17′10″N 0°35′49″E

Aldington mill was a Domesday mill. In 1269 it was held by William de Cobeham.

==== Lower Milgate Mill, Bearsted ====
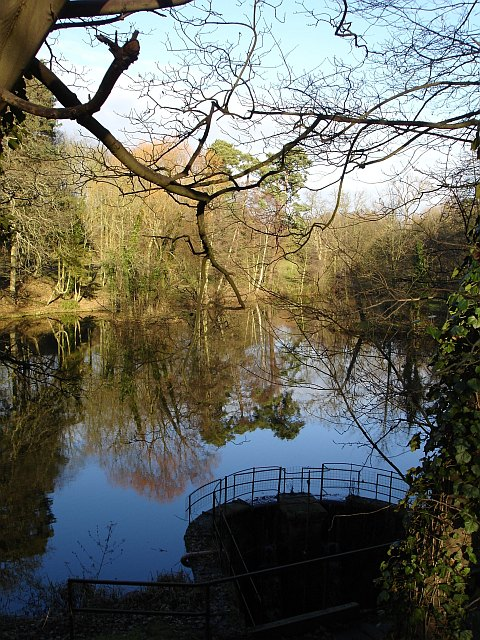
Millpond

TQ 802 552 51°16′02″N 0°35′03″E

This mill was part of a small estate known as The Comb. It was in existence during the first half of the eighteenth century, appearing on a map of 1707 which was partly resurveyed in 1746.

== See also ==
Medway watermills article
