= Leeds, Kent =

Village and civil parish in Kent, England

Coordinates: 51.246310°N 0.606630°E

Leeds
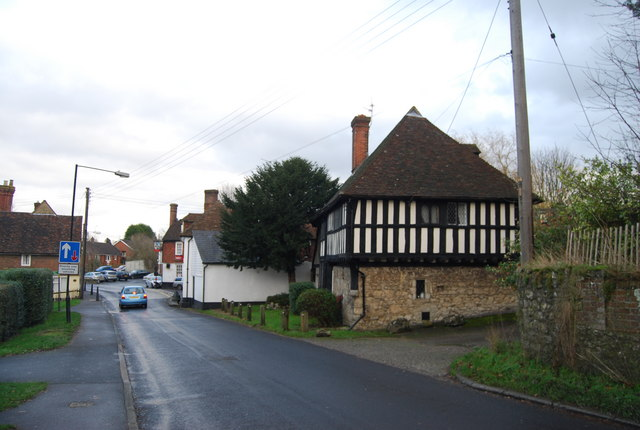
- Leeds

- Location within Kent
- Population: 2,394 (Ward, 2011); 790 (Parish, 2011)
- District: Maidstone
- Shire county: Kent
- Region: South East
- Country: England
- Sovereign state: United Kingdom
- Post town: Maidstone
- Postcode district: ME17
- Police: Kent
- Fire: Kent
- Ambulance: South East Coast
- UK Parliament: Faversham and Mid Kent

Leeds is a village and civil parish in the Maidstone district of Kent, England.

== Location ==
The village is located five miles (8.0 km) to the east of Maidstone, the county town of Kent.

== Etymology ==
It appeared in the Domesday Book as Esledes, possibly referring to a stream name. It is so called because the village is on the hillside above the River Len, a tributary of the River Medway. An alternative explanation for the name is that it derived its name from Ledian, who built the first wooden fortress here in 978.

== Notable features ==
St Nicholas's Church has the second largest Norman tower in England. Leeds Priory was dissolved in 1539. To the east of the village is Leeds Castle. The church and the castle are Grade I listed buildings and the site of the priory is a scheduled monument.

To the west and between Otham and Leeds the area of Caring is located. Caring has a number of modern farmhouses, in the style of an Oast house. Another attraction is the old Vineyard, a free tourist feature.

It also has a primary school, Leeds and Broomfield Church of England Primary.
