= Levin Bufkin =

Member of the Parliament of England

Levin Bufkin (about 1533 – 1617) was an English landowner who served as MP for the borough of Maidstone.

== Origins ==
He was the second but eldest surviving son of and heir to Ralph Bufkin (buried 11 January 1551), a mayor of Dover who in 1550 bought the estate of Gore Court in the parish of Otham, and his first wife Alice Gregory. His paternal grandfather, also Levin Bufkin, was an immigrant from Flanders. He had a legal training, entering Gray's Inn in 1555.

== Career ==
His main activity was acquiring and managing real estate, mostly around Maidstone and sometimes in co-operation with the Archbishopric of Canterbury. In 1576 he obtained a grant of arms, his shield being Or, a chevron between three close helmets or. At the general election of 1593, he and Sir Thomas Fludd were the two MPs chosen for Maidstone, both being appointed to the Committee on Kerseys. In 1595 he was one of the local notables appointed to administer a large bequest to the poor of the town. He did not stand again in the 1597 election and seems to have played no further part in public life.

== Family ==
In about 1561 he married Mary, the daughter of Christopher Roper of Lynsted and his wife Elizabeth Blore and the sister of John Roper, 1st Baron Teynham. After her death, he married Anne, widow of Walter Mayne of Biddenden and daughter of Sir John Guildford of Hemsted in Biddenden and his wife Barbara West. His third wife was Sybil Cranmer, widow of Stephen Fullwell, who survived him.

Children of Mary were Elizabeth, who married Sir Ralph Weldon of Swanscombe and had a son named Levin, and two girls who died young, Mary and Jane. Children of Anne were:

- Catherine, who on 19 January 1600 at Bearsted married Thomas Fludd, heir of Sir Thomas, and had three children, including a son named Levin.
- Barbara, buried unmarried in 1625 at Otham.
- Henry, who on the same day as his sister Catherine married Thomas' sister Sarah Fludd, the pair having five children including a son named Levin. He died before his father, in 1612, and Sarah then married James Bromfield of Ewhurst.
- Ralph (died 22 December 1638), who in 1621 married Anne Berners and had five children, including a son named Levin.

== Death and legacy ==
His will dated 4 October 1616 asked for burial without pomp and, after a small bequest to the poor of the parish, provided first for his wife Sybil and his unmarried daughter Barbara. The rest of his lands and goods went to the children of his eldest son Henry and to his heir and executor, the surviving son Ralph. Dying on 24 November 1617, he was buried on 25 November in Otham parish church, where a monument to him has been erected.

Parliament of England
Preceded by John Astley; Thomas Randolph	Member of Parliament for Maidstone; 1593; With: Sir Thomas Fludd	Succeeded by Sir Thomas Fludd; John Leveson
