= Leeds Priory =

Priory in Kent, England

Priory of St. Mary and St. Nicholas, Leeds (Leeds Abbey)
- Location within Kent

Monastery information
- Established: 1119
- Disestablished: 1539
- Dedication: St Mary and St Nicholas
- Diocese: Rochester

People
- Important associated figures: Robert de Crevequer

Site
- Location: Leeds, Kent
- Coordinates: 51°14′50″N 0°36′40″E
- Grid reference: TQ 823 530
- Visible remains: None
- Other information: Site obliterated by the building of a mansion, itself demolished in the 18th century.

Leeds Priory, also known as Leeds Abbey, was a priory in Leeds, Kent, England, that was founded in 1119 and dissolved in 1539. A mansion was later built on the site of the priory; it was demolished in the late 18th century. The site of the former priory is a scheduled monument.

== Description ==
The original priory church was built in the Norman style. Materials used in the construction were Kentish Ragstone, with Caen stone corners. It had a vaulted porch, similar to that to be seen today at Snettisham church, Norfolk. In the 1320s, the nave was rebuilt, and the north transept was enlarged in the Decorated style. The south transept may have been rebuilt at this time. At a later date, probably in the late 1380s or early 1390s, the presbytery was replaced. This was a reversal of the normal process, where the presbytery was rebuilt before the nave and transepts. A probable cause was the sharply rising ground immediately east of the church presenting a barrier to extension. The chapter house adjoined the south transept, built c. 1160.

The main church formed the northern part of the priory, with ranges to the east, west, and south. The warming house was probably in the south range. The kitchen was adjoining the south range.

== History ==
The Priory of St Mary and St Nicholas, also known as Leeds Abbey, was founded in 1119. Its founders were Robert de Crevequer and his son Adam. The priory was occupied by Augustinian canons. In 1177, Robert de Crevequer's son, also named Robert, bequeathed a fulling mill on the River Len to the priory in his will. The mill remained in the ownership of the priory until its dissolution. As well as Brandescombe Mill, the priory also possessed Abbey Mill at its dissolution.

In 1198, Pope Innocent III confirmed the priory as falling under the See of Canterbury. In 1368, the donations of the de Crevequers were confirmed by King Edward III, who also confirmed his patronage of the priory. In 1384, the priory was valued at £220. 12s. 8d. About this time, during the reign of King Richard II, canon Thomas Hazlewood came to Leeds Priory. He wrote several history books here, including A Compendious Chronicle. In 1452, King Richard III confirmed the liberties of the priory.

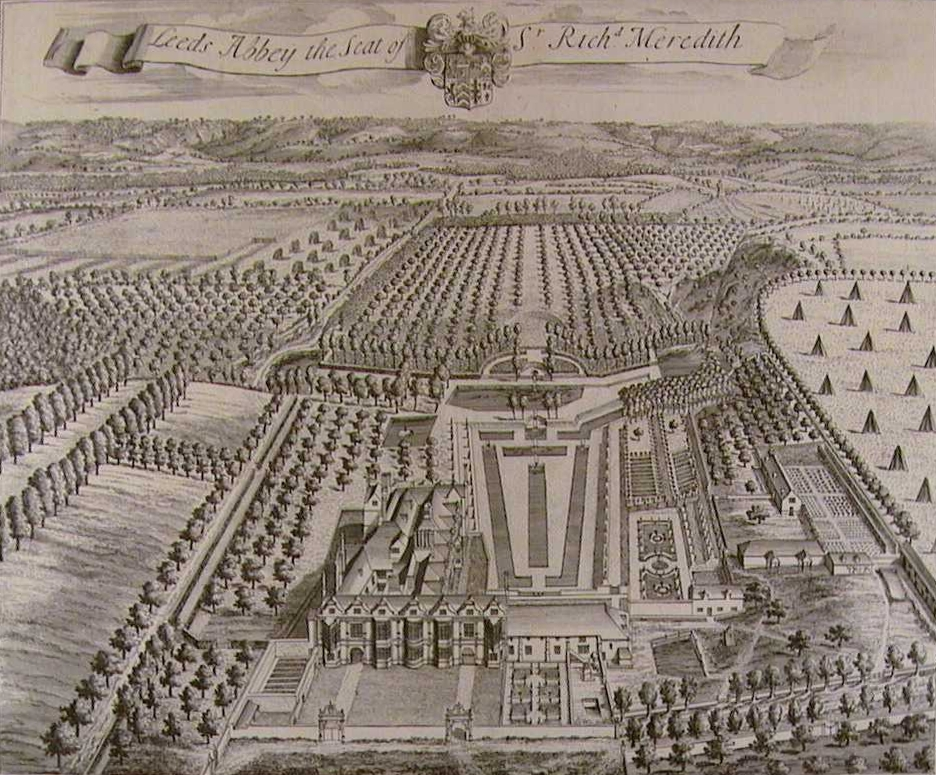
Leeds Abbey by Thomas Badeslade, 1719

By 1487, the priory was deeply in debt. James Goldwell, Bishop of Norwich, made generous donations to the priory, and gave sufficient support for an additional priest. Leeds Priory was dissolved in 1539, then being valued at £362. 7s. 7d. The last prior, Thomas Day, received a pension of £80 per annum from the King.

After the priory had been dissolved, the King leased it to Anthony St Leger for 21 years, at a rent of £22. 17s. 2d. per annum. The lease included both mills and 323 acres (131 ha) of land, and all houses etc. associated with the priory. The priory itself was demolished and the materials carried away. In 1551, King Edward VI granted the site of the priory and land and woods in Broomfield, Langley, Leeds and Sutton Valence amounting to 229 acres (93 ha) to St Leger to be held in capite. The remainder of the estate had been assigned in 1542 by King Henry VIII to the Dean and Chapter of Rochester.

In 1559, Warham St Leger inherited the priory from his father. In 1573, St Leger transferred the estate to Sir William Meredith, of Stansty, Denbighshire. A pigeon house was erected in the grounds of the priory. In 1581, Meredith's son, also named William, purchased certain lands in Warham St Leger that had previously formed part of the estate. The estate passed through Sir Richard Meredith to Sir Roger Meredith in 1723. Sir Roger died in 1738 and left the estate to his niece Susanna Meredith. On her death in 1758, the estate passed to Sir George Oxenden. In 1765, Oxenden sold the estate to John Calcraft, of Ingress, Kent, who considerably extended the house and landscaped the grounds. Calcraft died in 1772, and the estate passed to his son, John. The mansion was demolished at the end of the 18th century.

The dovecote of the mansion remains and is on the Historic England Heritage at Risk Register.

== Burials ==
- Eleanor de Ferrers, wife of Roger de Leybourne

== Excavations ==
The site of the priory was partially excavated in 1846. In 1973, an excavation of the site took place over eleven weeks in total, covering all four seasons. Members of the Archaeological Society of Sir Joseph Williamson's Mathematical School, Rochester, the Kent Archaeological Society, the Sittingbourne and Swale Archaeological Group and the Thameside Archaeological Group assisted in the excavation.

== See also ==
- List of scheduled monuments in Maidstone

== Sources ==
- Hasted, Edward (1798). The History and Topographical Survey of the County of Kent: Volume 5. Canterbury: W Bristow.
- Goodsall, Robert H. (1957). "Watermills on the Len". Archaeologia Cantiana. LXXI. Canterbury: Kent Archaeological Society.
- Spain, Robert (1967). "The Len Water-mills". Archaeologia Cantiana. LXXXII. Canterbury: Kent Archaeological Society.
- Tester, P J (1977). "Excavations on the Site of Leeds Priory, Part 1 – The Church". Archaeologia Cantiana. XCIII. Canterbury: Kent Archaeological Society.
- Tester, P J (1978). "Excavations on the Site of Leeds Priory, Part 2 – The Claustral Buildings and Other Remains". Archaeologia Cantiana. XCIV. Canterbury: Kent Archaeological Society.
