= Thomas Fludd =

Member of the Parliament of England

Sir Thomas Fludd (about 1530 – 1607), the son of Welsh parents, became a landowner in Kent, where he held several public offices. His youngest son was the scientist Robert Fludd.

== Origins ==
His father was John Fludd, the surname an English form of the Welsh Llwyd, from the village of St Martin's in Shropshire, who married Agnes from the neighbouring village of Weston Rhyn. Her father was Meredith Bonner, whose surname is probably an English form of the Welsh ap Ynyr. A brother, Richard Fludd, settled in Ireland, where the surname is spelled Flood, while two of his sisters married Kent landowners.

== Career ==
After an unknown education, around 1560 Thomas acquired Milgate House at Thurnham in Kent and became active first in local and then in national affairs.

In 1568 he secured the post of Surveyor of Crown Lands for the county of Kent and the cities of Rochester and Canterbury. In 1572 he had a grant of arms, his shield being Vert, a chevron between three wolves heads, erased, argent, and around 1579 became a Justice of the Peace for Kent. In 1582 he was appointed to the Exchequer as Receiver of Revenue for the counties of Kent, Surrey and Sussex. At the request of the inhabitants, he was in 1588 put on a special commission to examine the affairs of the town of New Romney. The next year he was knighted and appointed a paymaster to the English forces fighting in France under Lord Willoughby, a post changed after much bureaucratic in-fighting to Treasurer at War in 1597. In 1591 he was commissioned to supervise the renovation of Dover Harbour, being treasurer of the project in 1603.

In 1593 he was elected MP for the borough of Maidstone and was one of the Kent gentlemen selected by the county to compound with the Commissioners for Purveyance. In the House of Commons, he sat on the Subsidy Committee and the Committee on Kerseys. Re-elected as Maidstone's MP in 1597, he was admitted to Gray's Inn in 1601 and was elected for the third and final time to the Commons in 1601, where he sat on a committee to consider the abolition of gavelkind.

== Family ==
He first married Elizabeth, the daughter of Philip Andrews who lived at Wellington in Somerset and his wife Elizabeth, the daughter of Henry Parker and his wife Dorothy Shelley. She died on 25 January 1591 and was buried at Holy Cross Church in Bearsted. He later married Barbara, widow of Sir Henry Cutts, who survived him and married William Covert. Children are:

- Edward, who married Jane, daughter of Sir Michael Sands of Throwley and his wife Mary Finch, and had a daughter Mary. He died before 1607 and Jane married Sir Thomas May.
- Thomas, the eldest surviving son and heir, married Catherine, daughter of Levin Bufkin of Otham and his wife Anne Guilford. They had three children, including Thomas his heir.
- Joan married Sir Nicholas Gilborne of Charing at Bearsted on 7 April 1583 and had nine children.
- John, baptised at Bearsted on 10 August 1572, married Mary Purefoy and had a son Robert.
- Robert Fludd baptised at Bearsted 17 Jan 1573/4
- Catherine, baptised at Bearsted on 5 December 1579, married Thomas Lunsford and had seven children, including Sir Thomas Lunsford who went to Virginia.
- Sarah, baptised at Bearsted on 12 March 1581, married Henry Bufkin, brother of Catherine above, and had five children.

== Death and legacy ==
Making his will on 18 February 1607, he died on 30 May and was buried at Bearsted. In his will, proved on 11 June, he left small bequests to household servants, to the village church, to the poor in surrounding parishes and to the prisoners in Maidstone gaol. Legacies also went to his sister Catherine and brother Hugh. Most of his extensive real estate and personal effects were divided among his three surviving sons Thomas, John and Robert, with Robert also getting cash of 600 pounds (worth at least 120,000 pounds in 2015). To his three surviving daughters, Joan, Catherine and Sarah, bequests were minor, presumably because they already had portions on marrying. His wife Barbara kept her own goods and lands that she had brought to the marriage, with Thomas asked to let her live on at Milgate. In addition to his London house in Old Bailey, the landholdings mentioned in his will are predominantly in Kent but extend to Surrey, Sussex and his native Shropshire.

Parliament of England
Preceded by John Astley; Thomas Randolph	Member of Parliament for Maidstone; 1593; With: Levin Bufkin	Succeeded by Self; John Leveson
Preceded by Self; Levin Bufkin	Member of Parliament for Maidstone; 27 Sept 1597; With: John Leveson	Succeeded by Self; John Leveson
Preceded by Self; John Leveson	Member of Parliament for Maidstone; 2 October 1601; With: John Leveson	Succeeded by Sir Francis Fane; Laurence Washington
