= Holy Cross Church, Bearsted =

Coordinates: 51.270268°N 0.580539°E

Holy Cross Church
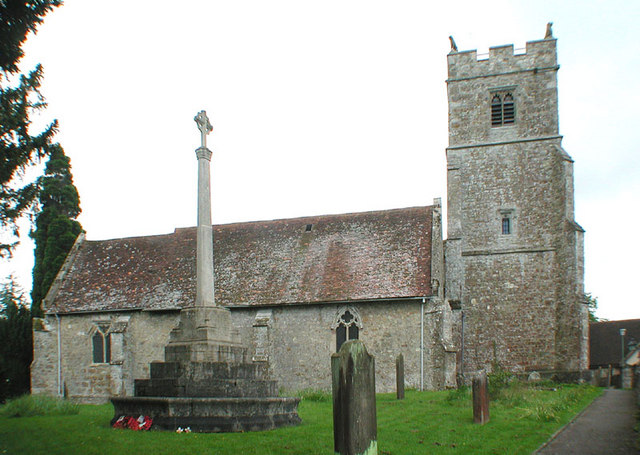
- North side of the church

- Location within Kent
- OS grid reference: TQ 80110 55509
- Location: Bearsted, Kent
- Country: England
- Denomination: Anglican
- Website: http://www.holycrosschurch.co.uk

History
- Status: Parish church

Architecture
- Functional status: Active
- Heritage designation: Grade I
- Designated: 23 May 1967
- Completed: 13th, 14th and 15th centuries

Administration
- Province: Canterbury
- Diocese: Canterbury
- Archdeaconry: Maidstone
- Deanery: North Downs
- Parish: Holy Cross, Bearsted

Holy Cross is a parish church of the Church of England in Bearsted, Kent. Its construction began in the 13th century.

== Building ==
Construction of the church began in the 13th century and continued in stages during the 14th and 15th centuries. It is built of local rag-stone and the roofs are covered with plain tiles. The nave is flanked by a single aisle on the north side and entered from a porch on the south side. At the west end of the nave is a square three-storey tower with a crenellated parapet, a stair turret on its south-east corner and staggered buttresses on the other three corners. Three stone beasts sit on the corners of the parapet. These are replacements of originals eroded over time, which may have originally represented three wolves from the ancestor of Fludd line Rhirid Flaidd coat of arms.

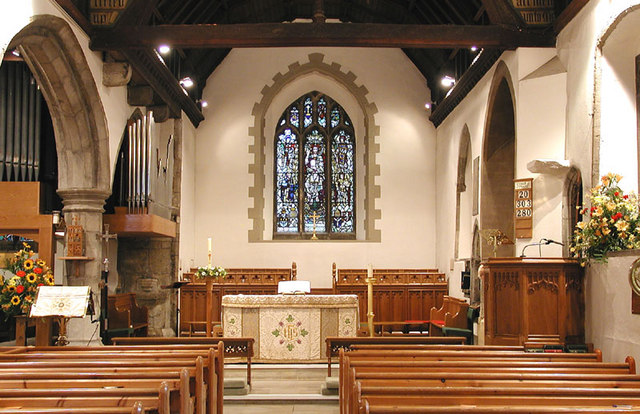
The interior of the church, looking towards the east end

The arcade between the nave and aisle has four bays and was constructed in the 14th century with the two at the east end rebuilt in the 15th century. A single arch at the west end of the arcade is possibly Anglo-Saxon. The south wall of the nave contains a stair to the rood loft. The chancel contains 13th-century sedile and piscina. Restoration of the church includes 19th-century panelling and pews in the nave and aisle, followed by 20th-century replacement of much of the roof.

The windows are generally small, except for those at the east end of the nave and aisle and above the doorway in the west wall of the tower. The south wall of the church features 13th-century lancet windows on the left of the porch and in the chancel. The windows on the north side are 14th century.

The church features monuments to Margarete and Steven Mason (died 1552 and 1560), Henrye Brockill of Aldington (died 1596), Susanna Cage (died 1634) and floor tablets to Eleonor, John and Guillemo Cage (late 17th century). Elizabeth Andras (died 1592), wife of Sir Thomas Fludd, and her son Robert Fludd, the physician and occultist (died 1637), are also commemorated with memorials in the church, the later with a bust on a plinth. The Milgate Chantry is a fourteenth century chantry located to the north of the aisle. It was suppressed in 1536, and subsequently belonged to the owners of Milgate House, Thurnham. From the 1560s until 1624 this was the Fludd family.

The church sits in a small churchyard to which is attached a larger graveyard to the east. John Dyke, the last man hanged on Penenden Heath, in 1830, is buried in the graveyard.

The church is a Grade I listed building (listed since 1967), and the churchyard contains three table tombs and the village war memorial which are listed Grade II.

== See also ==
- Grade I listed buildings in Maidstone
