= Powder of sympathy =

Pseudoscientific medical treatment and navigational aid

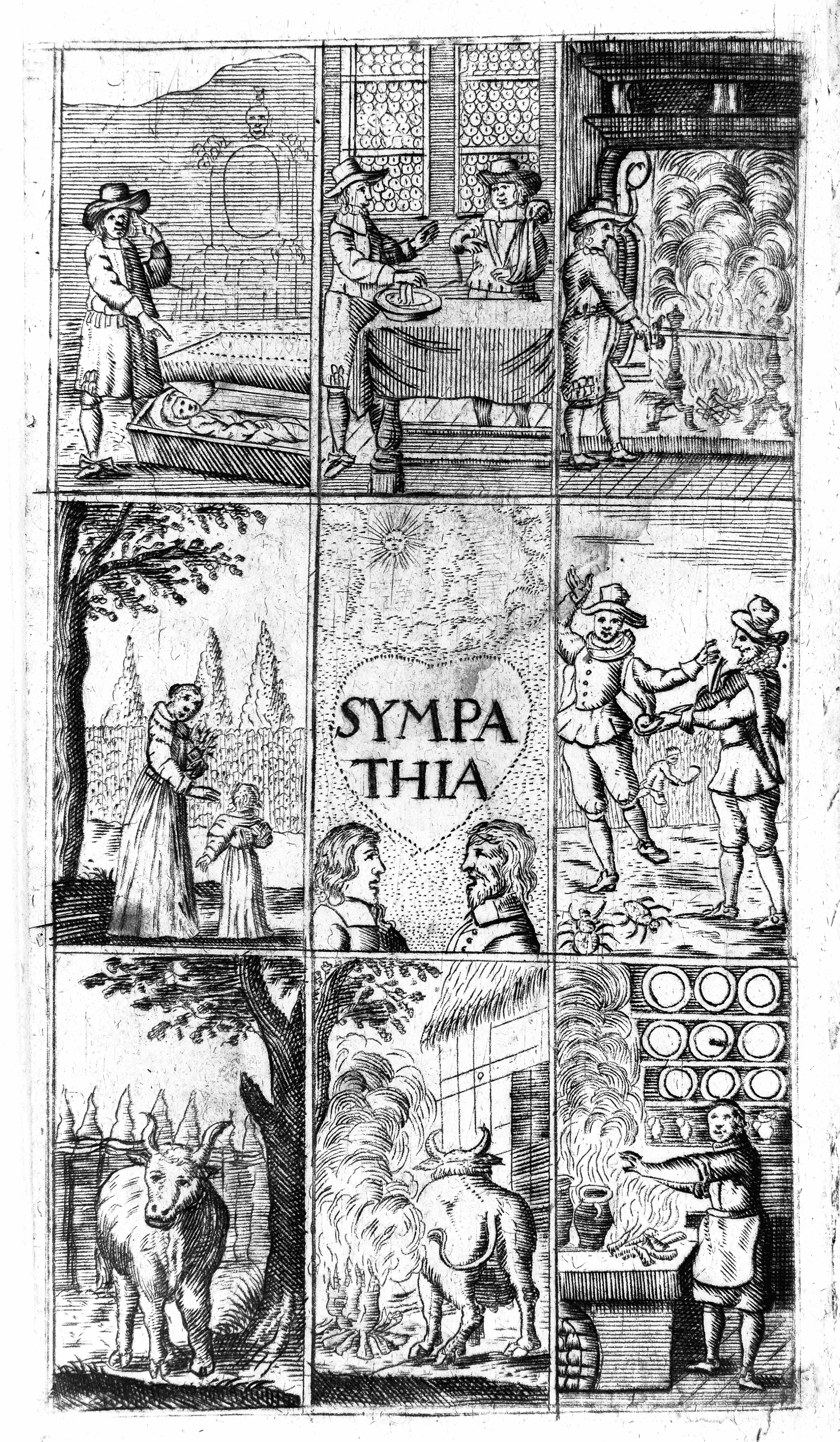
Frontispiece illustration of 'Sympathia'- (Powder of Sympathy) Wellcome

Powder of sympathy was a form of early pseudoscientific navigation and alchemy, in the 17th century in Europe, whereby a remedy was applied to the weapon that had caused a wound with the aim of healing the injury it had made. Weapon salve was a preparation, again applied to the weapon, but based on material from the wounded patient rather than on any remedy for the wound.

== History ==
The powder is said to have consisted of green vitriol, first dissolved in water and afterward recrystallized or calcined in the sun. The Duke of Buckingham testified that Kenelm Digby had healed his secretary of a gangrenous wound by simply soaking the bloody bandage in a solution of the powder (possibly due to the oligodynamic effect). Digby claimed to have got the secret remedy from a Carmelite friar in Florence, and attributed its potency to the fact that the sun's rays extracted the spirits of the blood and the vitriol, while, at the same time, the heat of the wound caused the healing principle thus produced to be attracted to it by means of a current of air — a sort of wireless therapy.

The powder was also applied to solve the longitude problem in the suggestion of an anonymous pamphlet of 1687 entitled Curious Enquiries. The pamphlet theorised that a wounded dog could be put aboard a ship, with the knife used to injure the dog left in the trust of a timekeeper on shore, who would then dip said knife into the powder at a predetermined time and cause the creature to yelp, thus giving the captain of the ship an accurate knowledge of the time.

== See also ==
- Sympathetic magic
