= Bearsted =

Village in Kent, England

Coordinates: 51.2738°N 0.5789°E

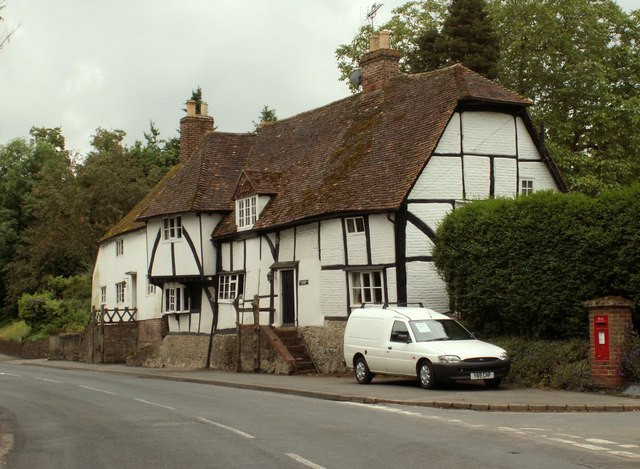
- Bearsted

- Location within Kent
- Population: 8,010; 8,209 (2011 Census)
- OS grid reference: TQ765555
- District: Maidstone
- Shire county: Kent
- Region: South East
- Country: England
- Sovereign state: United Kingdom
- Post town: MAIDSTONE
- Postcode district: ME14, ME15
- Dialling code: 01622
- Police: Kent
- Fire: Kent
- Ambulance: South East Coast
- UK Parliament: Faversham and Mid Kent

Bearsted (/ˈbɛərstɛd/ BAIR-sted, traditionally /ˈbɜːr-/ BUR-) is a village and civil parish with a railway station in mid-Kent, England, two miles (3.2 km) east of Maidstone town centre.

== Geography ==
The village was historically concentrated around Church Lane and The Green which includes The Street. The village is on the north bank of the River Len, a tributary of the River Medway at the foot of the North Downs. A stream, the Lilk, flows south into the river Len through Bearsted.

Although part of the growing conurbation of Maidstone, the centre of Bearsted retains a traditional village look with 59 listed properties, many surrounding the village green, flanked by two pubs.

The parish of Bearsted has a population of 8010 (2001 figure) and is broadly divided into two areas of development. The traditional village of Bearsted with modern development around its conservation areas lies north of the A20 Ashford Road and the Madginford neighbourhood, largely constructed in the 1960s, lies south of the Ashford Road. The area includes a small supermarket and shopping centre, a park and ride facility and primary school. The parish also incorporates part of tudor Mote Park on its western boundary. Parts of Madginford were formerly part of the parish of Otham but to avoid division have been appropriated as part of Bearsted.

== Transport ==
The village is connected by:

- Road: the A20 (London to Dover) trunk road passes through the village and junction 7 on the M20 motorway is 1.5 miles (2.5 km) north-west.
- Rail: Bearsted railway station on the Maidstone Line opened with the rail line on 1 July 1884. The station was originally named Bearsted and Thurnham.
- Footpaths: both the ancient Pilgrims' Way and the modern North Downs Way run along the North Downs north of Bearsted.

== Governance ==
Bearsted in elections every four years elects one representative to Kent County Council; this is currently:

Election	Member	Ward
2009	Paul Carter	Maidstone Rural North

Bearsted elects three representatives to Maidstone Borough Council; they are currently:

Election	Member
2008	Richard Ash
2011	Mike Cuming
2011	Val Springett

The parish council has 15 elected councillors with published monthly meeting dates at Madginford Hall, Egremont Road, Bearsted, Maidstone ME15 8LH or St Peter's Church Hall, Button Lane. Sometimes the finance and the planning committee meet at King George V Memorial Hall. In 2011 the parish council was elected, with elections every four years.

== History ==
Holy Cross Church is located on Church Lane to the south of the green. A fair used to be held here on Holy Cross Day, an ancient festival traced back to 335 AD when the Church of the Holy Sepulchre was dedicated in Jerusalem. The dedication to Holy Cross appears to have been a relatively popular one for pre-Conquest foundations. It is a Grade I listed building. Its stone arch is partially Saxon, embedded with later work. On three corners of the tower are stone beasts. Many books on Kent describe the animals on the tower as bears, and say these represent the name of the village.

Hasted's History and Topographical Survey of the County of Kent: Volume 5 (1798) reveals that the Anglo-Saxon name for the settlement was “Bergestede”, meaning “place on the hill/barrow”; other accounts refer to its earlier names as “Berghamstyde” and “Berghstede”. If the “Bergh” element does refer to a barrow (burial mound), this may be indicative of a church being sited on a previously revered site, in accordance with the advice of Pope Gregory to St. Augustine in 601 AD, which raises the possibility of this being a particularly early church site. It is possible that Bearsted is the “Berghamstyde” at which King Wihtred of Kent held a Council in 696AD and where he issued laws which are amongst the earliest of the Saxon written law codes.

The Green was known as the Hothe and used as common land and from the 15th to 17th centuries, a number of the buildings which provide The Green's historical character were built.

== Listed buildings in the conservation areas ==
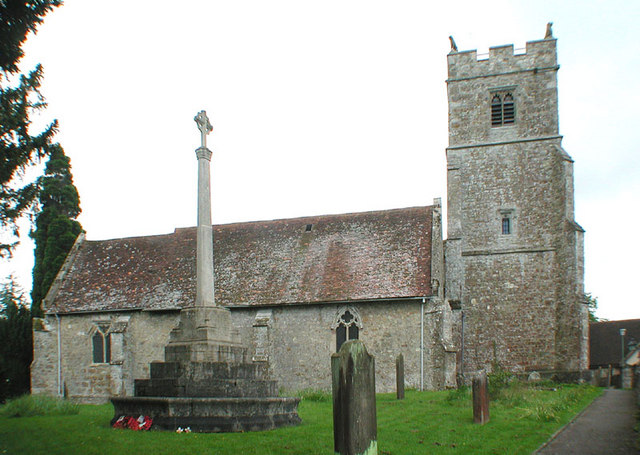
Holy Cross Church in 2003

Within the Holy Cross conservation area are:

Church of the Holy Cross	Grade I listed
Table Tomb of the Duckelbery Family	Grade II listed
Table Tomb of the Packman Family	Grade II listed
Table Tomb South East of Church Porch	Grade II listed
World War I War Memorial with deeply coved octagonal base	Grade II listed

Within Bearsted (The Green) Conservation area, which includes part of The Street from Oliver's Cottages westward, the listed buildings with the dates of oldest sections, are:

Snowfield	Grade II listed	1911 for author Baroness Orczy
Garden House	Grade II listed	1911 for author Baroness Orczy
Little Snowfield	Grade II listed	1912 for author Baroness Orczy's mother
Hill House	Grade II listed	18th century
The Soufflé restaurant at Old Timbers	Grade II listed	16th Century
The Limes	Grade II listed	15th century
Bell House	Grade II listed	16th century
Snowfield Cottage	Grade II listed	late 16th century or early 17th century
Forge Cottages	Grade II listed	17th century
Baxter's Cottage/Eden Cottage/Kozecot	Grade II listed	16th century
The Old Bakery	Grade II listed	15th century
1 Colegate Drive	Grade II listed	17th century
Old Manor Cottages and The Old Manor House	Grade II listed	15th century
Ivy House	Grade II listed	16th century
Holly House	Grade II listed	16th or 17th century
The White Horse	Grade II listed	16th century public house
Crisfield House	Grade II listed	18th century

== Amenities ==
The village is home to a tennis club along with a cricket club, bowls club and both a Scout group (1st Bearsted The Scarlet Pimpernels, founded 1912) and a Guide unit. Other establishments include a Rifle Club and The Bearsted and Thurnham Club, a private members' club, established in 1906, which overlooks the village green.

== Kent International Gateway Group Plans ==
In early 2007, the Kent International Gateway Group announced plans to build a large rail-freight and logistics depot in the corridor between Bearsted bounded by the railway line and the M20 motorway, an area which in use as fields and woodland. The controversial plans raised significant objections from local residents and the Campaign to Protect Rural England.

The planning application was rejected by the local planning authority, Maidstone Borough Council, and a public inquiry was held into Axa's appeal of this decision between 13 October 2009 and 23 December 2009. Following the public inquiry and review of the resulting Inspector's report, the Secretary of State for Communities and Local Government, Eric Pickles, rejected the appeal and refused planning permission for the development on 5 August 2010.

== Notable people ==
- Jenny Agutter O.B.E., actress, briefly lived in the village in her teens when her family moved back to Britain from Cyprus; wrote an open letter in 2009 supporting the "Stop KIG" (Kent International Gateway) protest group to help protect the character of the village
- Paul Ashbee (1918–2009), a leading British archaeologist born in Bearsted
- Robert Clifford (1752–1811), cricketer, lived in Bearsted
- William Clifford (chr. 1811 – 1841), cricketer, was christened in Bearsted church
- Nigel Donn (born 1962), football player, resides in Bearsted
- Geoffrey Dummer (1909–2002), electronics engineer, resided in Bearsted at the time of his death
- Robert Fludd (1574–1637), philosopher, was born and is buried in Bearsted
- Sir Thomas Fludd (1545–1607), of Milgate House, treasurer for Queen Elizabeth I's forces in the Netherlands, for which he was knighted
- Alfred Percy ("Tich") Freeman (1888–1965), Kent leg spin bowler; the only man to take 300 wickets in an English season; lived at a house called Dunbowlin
- Richard Hearne (1908–1979), actor and comedian, resided in Bearsted
- John Litchfield O.B.E. (1903–1993), naval captain and politician, lived at Snowfield from the 40s till the time of his death
- Thomas Mun (c. 1645 – 1692), politician, is buried in Bearsted churchyard
