= Manor of Dyrham =

The Manor of Dyrham was a former manorial estate in the parish of Dyrham in South Gloucestershire, England.

== Descent ==
=== FitzWido ===
The Domesday Book of 1086 records the tenant-in-chief of Dyrham as William FitzWido (William son of Guy, Latinised as Willelmus Filius Widonis). In 1086 he held 7 hides in Dyrham, formerly the land of Aluric. He had formerly held also 3 hides of this manor which Durand de Pitres, Sheriff of Gloucester, had given to Pershore Abbey, by the King's command. These had apparently (according to Mr Alfred Ellis)been given to Turstin FitzRolf by "Earl William", presumably William FitzOsbern, 1st Earl of Hereford.

=== Wynebald de Ballon ===
The manor then passed into the extensive fiefdom of Wynebald de Ballon, a magnate from Maine, France, who supported King William Rufus, and appears to have arrived in England with his brother Hamelin de Ballon between 1086 and 1088. Virtually the whole of Wynebald's fiefdom had formerly been held by Turstin FitzRolf, standard bearer to William the Conqueror at the Battle of Hastings, who appears to have rebelled against William II and been banished.

=== Newmarch ===
Dyrham passed with Wynebald's fiefdom, based at North Cadbury, Somerset, to his son-in-law de Newmarch who had married his daughter Mabilia. Wynebald's grandson Henry de Newmarch was raised to baronial status due to his holding of Wynebald's fiefdom per baroniam, and the resultant feudal barony is referred to as the Barony of North Cadbury, and the Newmarch holder of it as "Baron Newmarch".

=== Russell ===
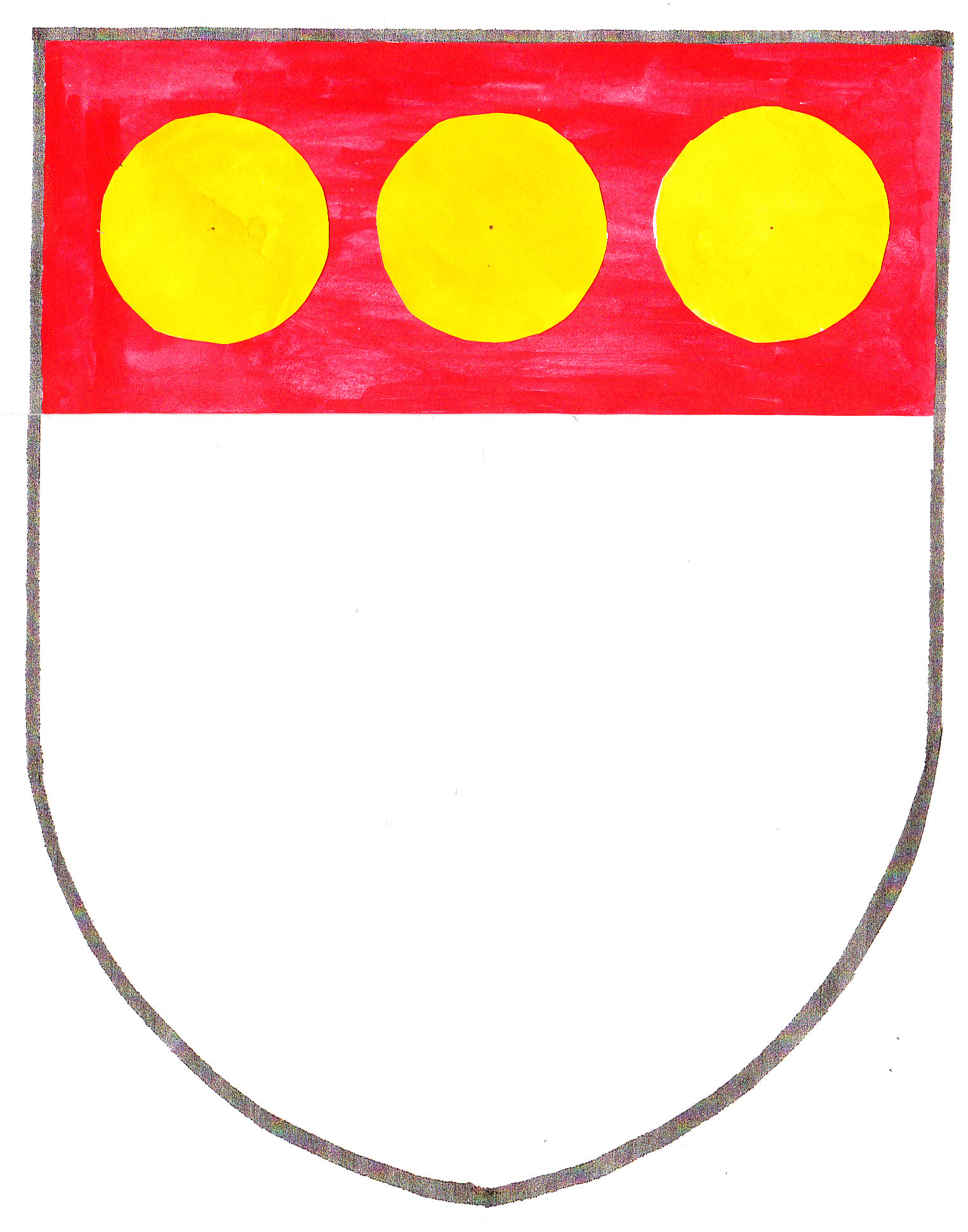
Arms of Russell of Kingston Russell & Dyrham: "Argent, on a chief gules 3 bezants"

Henry de Newmarch's heir was his youngest son James who died leaving two daughters co-heiresses to the barony, Isabel the eldest and Hawise. The barony was split, with a moiety going to the husband of each daughter, to be held on her behalf. James de Newmarch had died in 1216 whilst his daughters were still legal infants, i.e. under 18 years old, and the marriage of Isabel, and possibly of Hawise also, was granted by King Henry III to Sir John Russell (died c. 1224) of Kingston Russell in Dorset.

=== Sir Ralph Russell (born 1204) ===
Russell married off Isabel de Newmarch to his son Sir Ralph Russell(b.1204), and thus the moiety of the barony of Newmarch containing Dyrham came into the Russell family. The marriage of the other Newmarch heiress, Hawise, seemingly having been sold by Sir John Russell, was acquired by John Botterel, on whose death Hawise married secondly Sir Nicholas de Moels, to which family the other moiety of the barony descended. The Russell family appear to have resided during the 13th and 14th centuries firstly at Kingston Russell and latterly at Yaverland in the Isle of Wight, Hampshire. Ralph and Isabel's daughter Maud(d.1288) (also known as Matilda) married Robert Walerand(d.1273) of nearby Siston, a great magnate and Justiciar to King Henry III(1216–1272). Ralph gave Dyrham as Maud's dowry, but as the couple produced no children, Dyrham reverted to Ralph, as the following entry in the Close Rolls, dated 4 May 1273 at Westminster, shows:

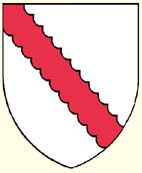
Armourials of Robert Walerand: "Argent, a bend engrailled gules"

"To Master Richard de Cliff(ord), escheator this side Trent. Order to deliver the manor of Derham to Ralph Russell, together with everything received there from the time of its being taken into the king's hands, as the king learns by inquisition taken by the escheator that Ralph gave his said manor to Robert Waleraund with Matilda his daughter, whom Robert married, to hold to Robert and the heirs of their bodies, with reversion to Ralph in default of such heirs, and that Robert died without an heir of his body, wherefore the manor ought to revert to Ralph".

Clearly the escheator had seized Dyrham believing it to be held by Walerand in his own right. Maud retained Dyrham as her dowry, along with the customary third share in many of Walerand's extensive manors elsewhere, until her death in 1288. By then her father Ralph was dead and the Russell lands had passed into the wardship of Queen Eleanor of Castile, wife of King Edward I, during the minority of Ralph II Russell, son of her deceased brother James. Ralph II, who had married a certain Eleanor(d.1303), died without issue in 1295 whereupon the lands passed to his uncle Robert, 2nd brother of James, who died shortly thereafter in 1298, again without issue, the lands then descending to William, the 3rd brother.

=== Sir William Russell(1257-1311) ===
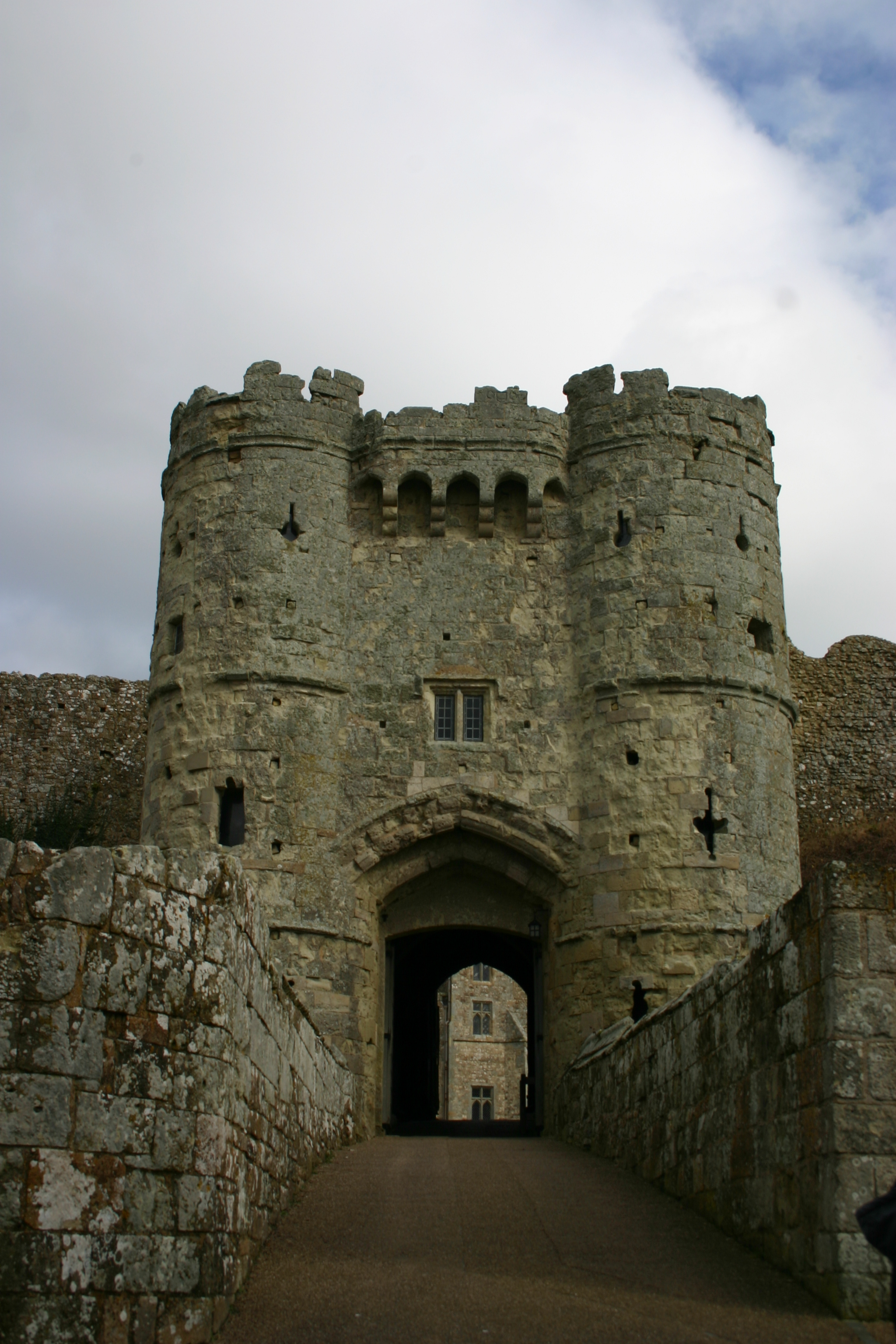
Entrance to Carisbrooke Castle, Isle of Wight, of which Sir William Russell was Constable

Sir Ralph Russell's 3rd son and eventual heir was Sir William Russell(1257–1311) who married in about 1280 Katherine de Aula, heiress of the de Aula family of the Isle of Wight, who brought to the Russell family the manor of Yaverland, Isle of Wight. Sir William Russell was seated there for the remainder of his life and played a central role in the defence of the Island from the frequent attacks by the French. He was appointed as one of 3 Wardens of the Island and Constable of Carisbrooke Castle, the caput of the Island, from which all manors were held under feudal ties. In 1294 he received royal instructions for putting the Island into a proper posture to meet the threatened invasion by France of the southern coasts of England. In 1295, still as a younger son, his brothers being still alive, he was elected to parliament as burgess for Great Bedwyn, Wiltshire, where the Russell family held the manor of Little Bedwyn. In 1297 he was summoned by King Edward I to join with his barons to muster in London in preparation for a military expedition crossing over to Flanders. Sir William was summoned by royal writ to be at York on 25 May 1298 to oppose the Scotsman William Wallace. He fought at the Battle of Falkirk, where a great English victory was won. However, the Scottish forces regrouped and Russell was again summoned to join King Edward's army on 24 June 1300 at Carlisle.

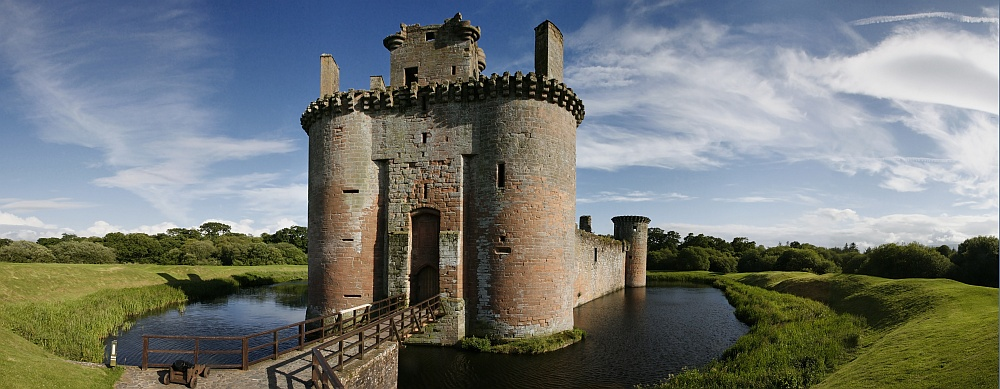
Caerlaverock Castle, Dumfries, Scotland. Sir William Russell was part of the army at its siege in 1300

He was present at the Siege of Caerlaverock later that year, during which his armourials were recorded in the famous eponymous roll of arms made then by the heralds. Russell was again summoned as "Sir William Russell of the Isle" to be ready at Carlisle in 1301, after which the army wintered with much hardship in Scotland. In 1302 he was appointed for a 2nd time a Warden of the Isle, with Sir John de Lisle. In 1307 Russell received another summons from King Edward I Hammer of the Scots to join the royal army at Carlisle within 15 days of 8 July, to counter the aggression of Robert the Bruce. Before the campaign commenced, the King determined on knighting his son, and was accorded by parliament the customary feudal aid, a form of taxation, to meet the costs of the splendid ceremony. Russell was appointed as collector of this feudal aid for the county of Southampton. On this occasion the royal army was spared any fighting since Bruce had in the meantime been defeated by the border barons acting independently. King Edward II, just knighted as Prince of Wales, succeeded his father later in the year 1307 and called his first parliament to meet at Northampton, to which Sir William Russell was summoned by writ for the county of Southampton. Russell thereupon relinquished his duties as Constable of Carisbrooke Castle to his successor Nicholas de Bois. In 1308 by letters patent Russell was appointed 1 of 3 justiciaries for the Channel Islands to make enquiry into encroachments to the royal revenues. In 1309 Russell was summoned by royal writ to be ready "with horse, arms, and all his lawful service (i.e. retinue)" at Newcastle upon Tyne, by 29 September., to punish the Scots for their non-observance of the truce recently entered into. By now Russell was elderly and being unable to meet the summons in person, he sent knights to serve in his stead. Sir William Russell died in 1311, leaving an only son, Theobald Russell, still a minor aged only 7.

=== Sir Theobald Russell ===
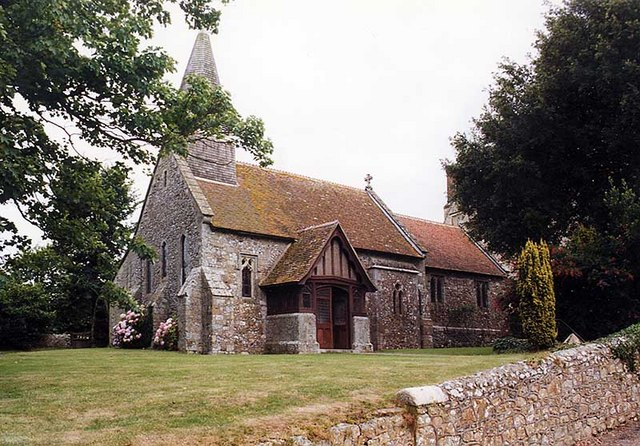
Church of St John the Baptist, Yaverland, Isle of Wight, probably built by the de Aula family, c. 1150. The Russell family held the advowson of this church, and established a chantry

Sir Theobald, as his father, was not based at Dyrham but in the Isle of Wight. He died in 1349 leading local forces against a French invasion of the Isle. He had sub-enfeoffed Dyrham to Roger de Cantock(d.1349), who is recorded as holding the manor in 1347 in the records of the feudal aid of 20 Edward III (1347):

"De Rogero Cantek pro uno foedo militis in Derham et Henton quod Willelmus Russel quondam tenuit ibidem, XX s" (Received from Roger de Cantock for one knight's fee in Dyrham and Hinton which William Russell once held the same, 20 shillings)

A certain Roger de Cantock, possibly his father, was prepositor to the Sheriff of Bristol in 1260 and 1271. "Cantock's Close" in Bristol, now occupied by buildings of the University, was apparently a field owned by his family. Cantock had been appointed by the Russell family as parson of the church in their manor of Hardwick, Buckinghamshire, a former Newmarch manor. In 1332 he was granted the manor of Hardwick itself for the term of his life, which ended in 1349. He was possibly related to Thomas Cantock, Bishop of Emly, who was appointed Lord Chancellor of Ireland in 1306. Roger went to Ireland in 1309, possibly to visit this relative, as the following entry in the patent rolls of 2 Edward II (1309) shows:

"Master Roger Cantok, parson of the Church of Herdewyk, going to Ireland, has letters nominating Nicholas de Langeton his attorney until Michaelmas, May 2, Westminster"

Theobald Russell's grandson was Sir Maurice Russell(1356–1416), the first of the family to make his home at Dyrham.

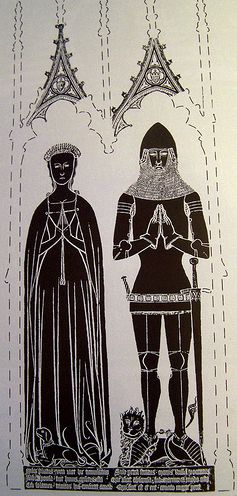
Sir Maurice Russell(1356-1416) of Dyrham and Kingston Russell and first wife Isabel Childrey. Rubbing from funerary brass at Dyrham Church. Note Russell armorials in small escutcheon in gable of canopy

=== Sir Maurice Russell ===
On his marriage to Isabel Childrey, Maurice was granted the manor of Dyrham by his father, and appears to have set up home here. The marriage settlement entailed the manor of Dyrham and other manors to the progeny of this marriage. He was buried in St. Peter's church next to the manor house, as his funerary brass attests. He married his eldest daughter to his neighbour at Siston, Sir Gilbert Denys(d.1422), with whom he was involved in administrative duties for Gloucestershire. By his 2nd marriage to Joan Dauntsey, Russell had his only son and heir, Thomas, who survived his father by 16 years and died aged about 18 in 1432. On his father's death, Thomas had become a royal ward, and had been found a wife named Margery, of family unknown, but no doubt as a result of his marriage having been sold by his guardian. Margery was pregnant at the time of Thomas's death, but her daughter died as an infant soon after her birth. Thus was extinguished the line of Russell of Dyrham and Kingston Russell. As most of the Russell lands had been entailed to the progeny of Sir Maurice's first marriage, Dyrham passed into the hands of his two daughters by Isabel Childrey, Margaret and Isabel. The right heirs of Thomas would inherit the unentailed Russell lands on the Isle of Wight and elsewhere. Isabel and her 3rd husband Sir John Drayton of Nuneham Courtenay, Oxfordshire, sold their moiety of the Russell inheritance to Margaret and her husband Sir Gilbert Denys of Siston, and thus Dyrham and Kingston Russell descended into the Denys family, which held Kingston Russell until 1543 and Dyrham until 1571.

=== Sir William Denys ===
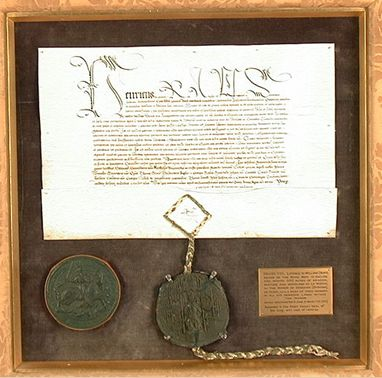
Royal licence to empark Dyrham granted by King Henry VIII to William Denys, Esquire of the Body, 5th June 1511. Note the rare perfect example of the Great Seal of Henry VIII. Collection of Dyrham Park, National Trust

The first of the Denys family to have resided at Dyrham rather than at the Denys ancestral manor of Siston, appears to have been Sir William Denys(1470–1533), son of Sir Walter Denys(d.1505), who is depicted on the Denys monumental brass in the Church of Olveston, which manor was also held by the family, and Agnes Danvers. His half-uncle was Hugh Denys(d.1511) who had been Groom of the Stool to King Henry VII(1485–1509). It may have been due to the closeness of Hugh to the old King, for he occupied the foremost position of all the courtiers, that Henry's son Henry VIII appointed Sir William as an Esquire of the Body, at some date before 5 June 1511. The new King had not continued Hugh Denys in his post, which was one of some personal intimacy, having appointed his own favourite Sir William Compton(d.1528), but perhaps out of respect for his father's loyal old servant had kept him on as a standard Esquire of the Body for the first 2 years of his reign until Hugh's death in 1511. It was perhaps at the very time of William's appointment as an Esquire of the Body that the King granted him the honour of the licence to empark 500 acres of Dyrham, which is to say to enclose the land with a wall or hedgebank and to establish a captive herd of deer within, with exclusive hunting rights. This grant is witnessed by a charter on parchment, to which is affixed a rare example of a perfect great seal of Henry VIII, now hanging in a frame beneath the main staircase of Dyrham Park. It clearly was handed down with the deeds of the manor on the termination of the Denys era at Dyrham. The charter is of exceptional interest as it is signed as witnesses by men of the greatest importance in the state, who were at the King's side at that moment, at the Palace of Westminster. The text of the document, translated from Latin is as follows:

"Henry by the grace of God King of England and France and Lord of Ireland sends greetings to his archbishops, bishops, abbotts, priors, dukes, marquises, earls, barons, judges, sheriffs, reeves, ministers and all our bailiffs and faithful subjects. Let it be known that we, motivated by our especial grace and certain knowledge of him, have granted for us and our heirs to our faithful servant William Denys, esquire of the Royal Body, to him, his heirs and assigns, the right to empark 500 acres of land, meadow, pasture and wood together with appurtenance at Le Worthy within the manor of Dereham in the county of Gloucestershire and enclose them with fences and hedges in order to make a park there. Also that they may have free warren in all their demesne lands within the said manor. No other person may enter this park or warren to hunt or catch anything which might belong to that park or warren without permission from William, his heirs or assigns under penalty of £10, provided that the land is not within our forest.
Witnessed by:

- The most reverend in Christ father William Canterbury our chancellor and archbishop
- The reverend in Christ fathers Richard Winchester, Keeper of the Privy Purse and
- Thomas Durham, our secretary, bishops.
- Thomas Surrey, Treasurer of England and
- George Shrewsbury, steward of our household, earls.
- Charles Somerset Lord Herbert, our chamberlain and
- George Neville of Abergavenny, barons.
- Thomas Lovell, treasurer of our household and
- Edward Poynings, comptroller of our household, knights, and many others.

Given by our hand at Westminster on the 5th day of June in the 3rd year of our reign" (1511).

From the size of the present park it appears that only about 250 acres were ultimately enclosed. Sir William served as High Sheriff of Gloucestershire in 1518 and 1526, continuing the tradition of the Denys family which would hold that post on more occasions than any other family. William Denys married firstly in about 1482, Edith Twynyho, da. of John Twynyho(d.1485), a wealthy cloth merchant of Cirencester, MP for Bristol 1472-5, 1484, and sister-in-law to John Tame(d.1500), the builder of Fairford Church, Glos., business partner of John Twynyho and favoured courtier of Henry VII. The marriage settlement is contained in a charter dated 21 Ed IV (1482), quoted by the Inquisition post mortem of Sir William Denys. The marriage produced no issue. William married 2ndly Anne Berkeley, da. of Maurice Berkeley, de jure 3rd Baron Berkeley, from the leading Gloucestershire family. This marriage accorded to William a considerable status in the county gentry.

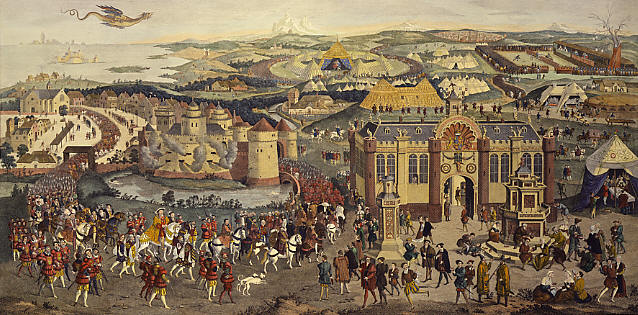
Henry VIII at the Field of the Cloth of Gold, June 1520. William Denys was in the retinue of Katherine of Aragon

In June 1520 Denys was one of the 7 knights of Gloucestershire selected to form part of the 100 nobles and gentlemen appointed to attend King Henry VIII at the Field of the Cloth of Gold, near Calais, where the King was to meet King Francis I of France. Each knight was expected to bring his own retinue, but limited to 10 persons and 4 horses. Denys's former brother-in-law Edmund Tame(d.1534) was also on the Gloucestershire list, but his name was subsequently struck out and replaced, possibly due to ill-health. In a subsequent record Deny's name is shown as erased from the list of those attending the King, with the words "With the Queen" added, suggesting he had been transferred into the retinue of Katharine of Aragon. In 1520 Sir William and Lady Ann founded the "Guild of St. Dennis" in the Church of St Peter, Dyrham, which had about 300 members, not only from Gloucestershire but also from adjoining

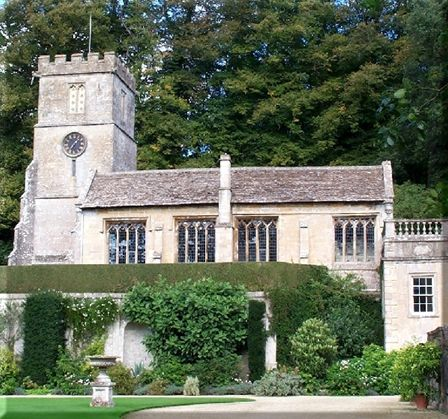
St Peter's Church, Dyrham

counties. The records of the guild are held by Bristol Archives. It is likely that the Patron Saint was selected due to his having the same name as the Denys family, yet the family itself was probably so named not after the saint, but due to its probable Danish origins. There were 3 prominent mediaeval Denys families in the South-West, one from Ilchester, Somerset, one from Devon, and that from Glamorgan which later came to Siston and Dyrham in Gloucestershire. The three families may all have originated from a common root before the era of the mass adoption of armorials, that is to say the first half of the 13th century. The Somerset branch was the most ancient, having disappeared before it might have adopted arms, but the Devon Denys's adopted as their arms three Danish battle-axes, as borne by the King of Denmark and recorded on various rolls of arms. Sir William's younger son, Sir Maurice Denys(d.1563) entangled the family as a whole in his debts which he had accumulated through his property speculation during the Dissolution of the Monasteries and through his construction of Siston Court. This forced his elder brother Sir Walter Denys(d.1571) to sell Dyrham shortly before his death, which was purchased by the Wynter family. When the Wynter heiress Mary married William Blathwayt, the Dyrham estate passed to the Blathwayte family, builders of the present William & Mary style mansion known as Dyrham Park, said to incorporate some of the structure of the earlier manor house.

== Sources ==
- Sanders, I. J. English Baronies, a Study of their Origin and Descent 1086-1327, Oxford, 1960. North Cadbury, p. 68
- Scott-Thomson, Gladys FRHistSoc, Two Centuries of Family History, London, 1930. (Contains pedigree of Russell of Kingston Russell & critique of Wiffen's work)
- Wiffen, J. H., Historical Memoirs of the House of Russell from the Time of the Norman Conquest, 1883. vol.1 (Confounds the family of Russell of KR with Russell ancestors of Dukes of Bedford, but otherwise contains excellent biographical research)
