= Kingston Russell (disambiguation) =

Kingston Russell is a settlement in Dorset, England.

Kingston Russell may also refer to:

- Kingston Russell House, mansion near Long Bredy, Dorset, England
- Kingston Russell Stone Circle, monument in Dorset, England
