= William Russell (knight) =

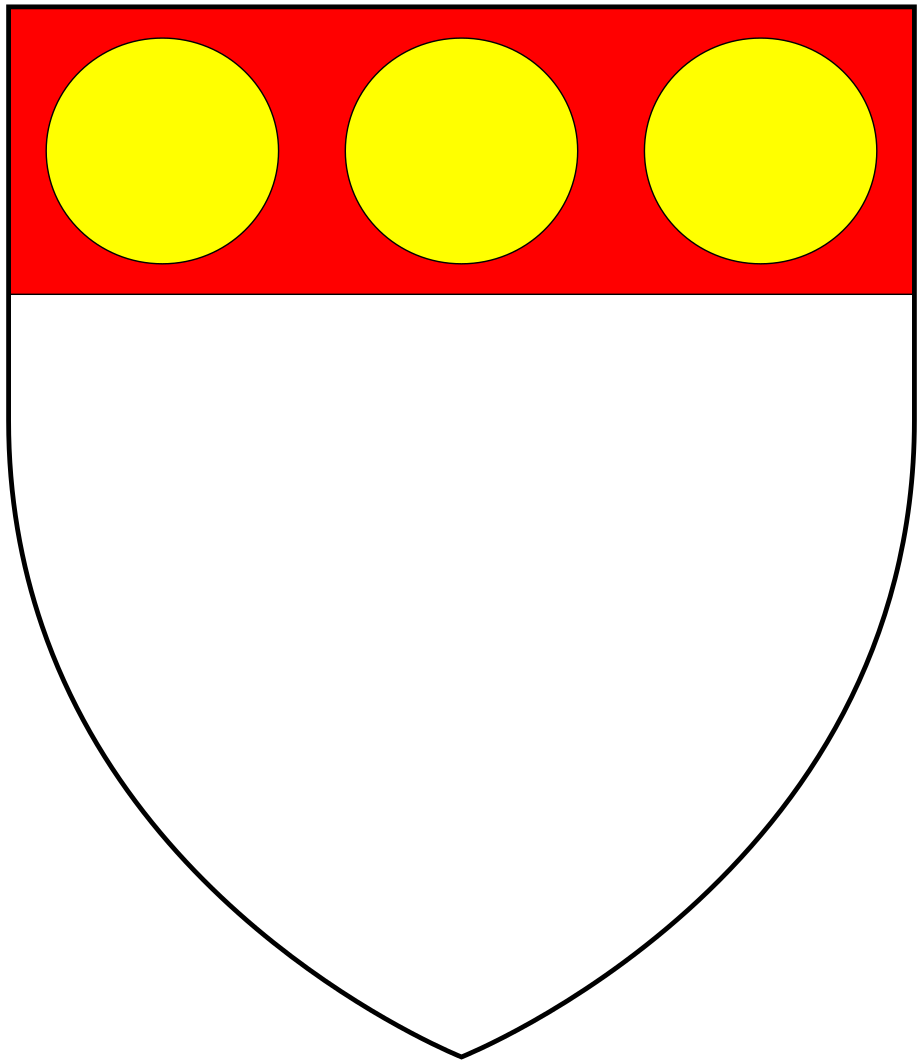
Arms of Russell of Kingston Russell & Dyrham: Argent, on a chief gules three bezants

Sir William Russell (1257–1311) was an English nobleman, knight, and holder of a moiety of the feudal barony of North Cadbury, Somerset, but spent most of his life engaged in the administration and defence of the Isle of Wight, where he obtained by marriage the manor of Yaverland. He served as constable of Carisbrooke Castle, and sat in parliament on two occasions, firstly as burgess for Great Bedwyn, Wiltshire, and then for the County of Southampton. As a baron his military service was called on several times by King Edward I Hammer of the Scots.

== Origin ==
William Russell was the third son and eventual heir of Sir Ralph Russell (b. 1204), son of Sir John Russell (d. c. 1224) of Kingston Russell, Dorset, steward of Kings John (1199–1216) and his young son Henry III (1216–1272). Shortly before his death King John had granted Russell the manor of Kingston by grand serjeanty, which grant was confirmed by Henry.

William had inherited from his mother Isabel de Newmarch a moiety of the Newmarch barony of North Cadbury, and it was this holding per baroniam which, although the other half had gone to Nicholas de Moels, the husband of Isabel's sister Hawise de Newmarch, nevertheless brought him membership of the baronage, with all the onerous duties which accompanied such a dignity.

== Marriage to Katherine de Aula ==
In about 1280 William married Katherine de Aula, heiress of the de Aula family of the Isle of Wight, who brought to the Russell family the manor of Yaverland, Isle of Wight.

== Career ==
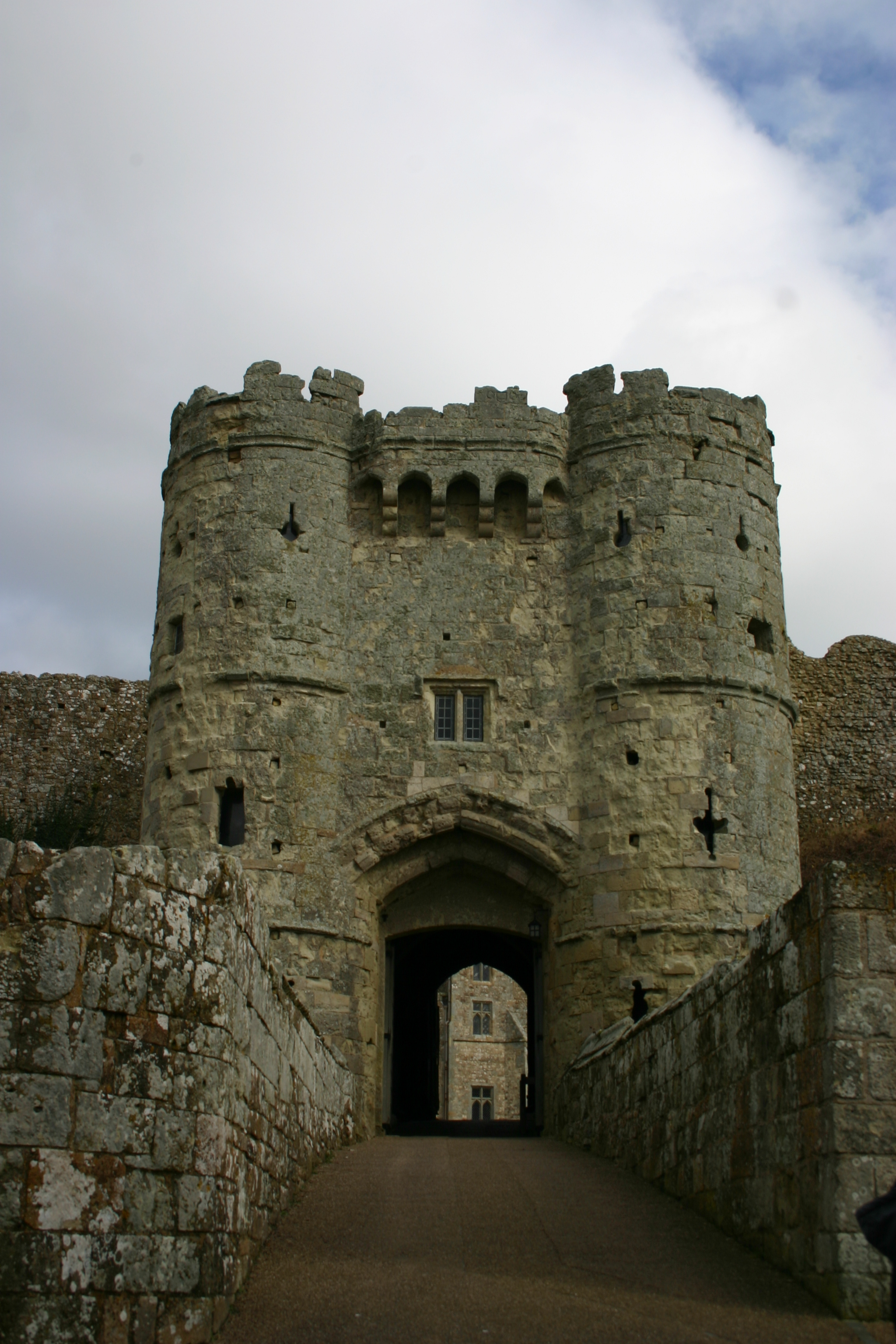
Entrance to Carisbrooke Castle, Isle of Wight, of which Sir William Russell was Constable

Sir William Russell was seated at Yaverland for the remainder of his life and played a central role in the defence of the Island from the frequent attacks by the French. He was appointed as one of three Wardens of the Island and Constable of Carisbrooke Castle, the caput of the Island, from which all manors were held under feudal ties. In 1294 he received royal instructions for putting the Island into a proper posture to meet the threatened invasion by France of the southern coasts of England.

In 1295, still as a younger son, his brothers being still alive, he was elected to parliament as burgess for Great Bedwyn, Wiltshire, where the Russell family held the manor of Little Bedwyn, apparently acquired by his grandfather John Russell. In 1297 he was summoned by King Edward I to join with his barons to muster in London in preparation for a military expedition crossing over to Flanders. Sir William was summoned by royal writ to be at York on 25 May 1298 to oppose the Scotsman William Wallace. He fought at the Battle of Falkirk, where a great English victory was won. However, the Scottish forces regrouped and Russell was again summoned to join King Edward's army on 24 June 1300 at Carlisle.

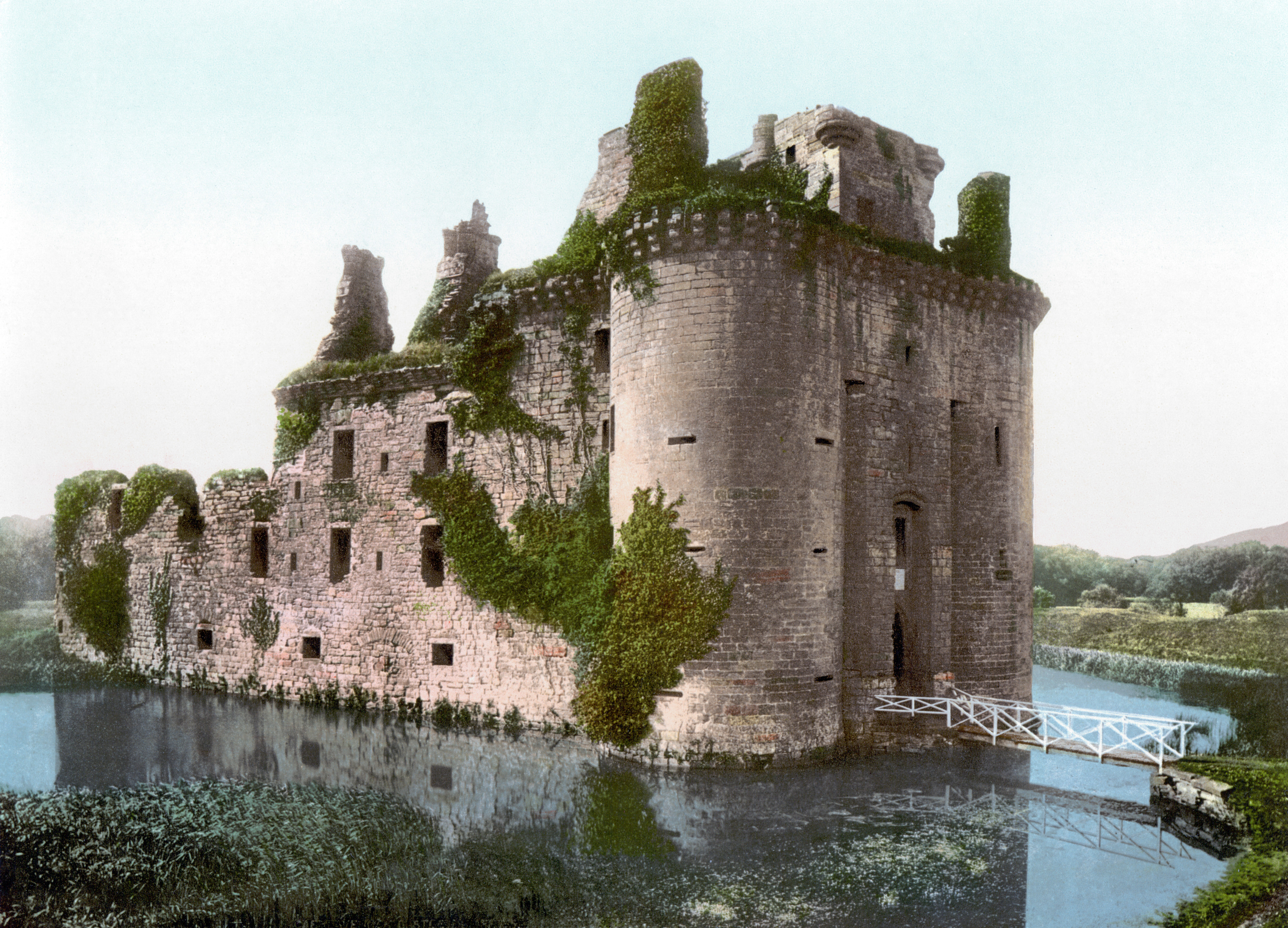
Caerlaverock Castle, Dumfries, Scotland. Sir William Russell was part of the army at its siege in 1300

He was present at the Siege of Caerlaverock later that year, during which his armourials were recorded in the eponymous roll of arms made then by the heralds. Russell was again summoned as "Sir William Russell of the Isle" to be ready at Carlisle in 1301, after which the army wintered with much hardship in Scotland. In 1302 he was appointed for a 2nd time a Warden of the Isle, with Sir John de Lisle. In 1307 Russell received another summons from King Edward I Hammer of the Scots to join the royal army at Carlisle within 15 days of 8 July, to counter the aggression of Robert the Bruce. Before the campaign commenced, the King determined on knighting his son, and was accorded by parliament the customary feudal aid, a form of taxation, to meet the costs of the splendid ceremony. Russell was appointed as collector of this feudal aid for the county of Southampton. On this occasion the royal army was spared any fighting since Bruce had in the meantime been defeated by the border barons acting independently.

King Edward II, just knighted as Prince of Wales, succeeded his father later in the year 1307 and called his first parliament to meet at Northampton, to which Sir William Russell was summoned by writ for the county of Southampton. Russell thereupon relinquished his duties as Constable of Carisbrooke Castle to his successor Nicholas de Bois. In 1308 by letters patent Russell was appointed one of three justiciaries for the Channel Islands to make enquiry into encroachments to the royal revenues. In 1309 Russell was summoned by royal writ to be ready "with horse, arms, and all his lawful service (i.e. retinue)" at Newcastle upon Tyne, by 29 September, to punish the Scots for their non-observance of the truce recently entered into. By now Russell was in failing health and being unable to meet the summons in person, he sent knights to serve in his stead. Sir William Russell died in 1311, leaving an only son, Theobald Russell, a minor aged 7.

== Succession ==
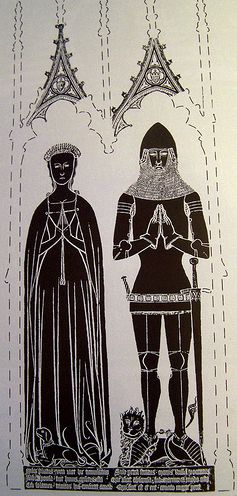
Sir Maurice Russell(1356-1416) and first wife Isabel Childrey. Rubbing from funerary brass, Dyrham Church, 1416

William's infant son Theobald (1303–1349) was granted in wardship to Ralph III, 1st Baron Gorges (d. 1324) of Knighton manor, Isle of Wight, Wraxall, Somerset, and Bradpole, Dorset. Gorges married off his young ward to his second daughter Eleanor, who eventually became one of three co-heiresses to her brother Ralph IV, 2nd Baron Gorges (d. 1331). Theobald and Eleanor had five sons. The eldest was Sir Ralph Russell (d. 1375) who inherited his patrimonial Russell lands, whose adult male line was to die out on the death of his third son and eventual heir Sir Maurice Russell (1356–1416) of Kingston Russell and Dyrham, Gloucestershire. Theobald I & Eleanor's second son was Theobald II Russell, who was made the heir of his uncle the second Baron Gorges, who had died without male issue and left him the bulk of the Gorges lands on condition he should change his family name and arms to Gorges. This he did and founded a new line of "Gorges" based at Wraxall. The history of the youngest three sons, William, John and Richard, is not recorded, although William, apparently based at Knighton, is known to have died without male issue on 24 March 1343.

== Sources ==
- Sanders, I. J. English Baronies, a Study of their Origin and Descent 1086-1327, Oxford, 1960. North Cadbury, p. 68
- Scott-Thomson, Gladys FRHistSoc, Two Centuries of Family History, London, 1930. (Contains pedigree of Russell of Kingston Russell & critique of Wiffen's work)
- Wiffen, J. H. Historical Memoirs of the House of Russell from the Time of the Norman Conquest, 1883. vol.1
- Gorges, Raymond & Brown, Frederick, Rev., FSA. The Story of a Family through Eleven Centuries, Illustrated by Portraits and Pedigrees: Being a History of the Family of Gorges. Boston, USA, (Merrymount Press privately published), 1944.
- Victoria County History, Hampshire, Isle of Wight
