= Kingston Russell House =

Grade I listed building in Dorset, England

Coordinates: 50°42′14.67″N 2°36′28.40″W

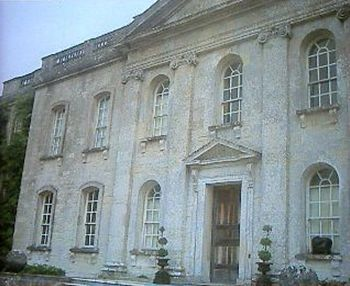
Kingston Russell House, west facade

Kingston Russell House is a large mansion house and manor near Long Bredy in Dorset, England, west of Dorchester. The present house dates from the late 17th century but in 1730 was clad in a white Georgian stone facade. The house was restored in 1913, and at the same time the gardens were laid out.

== Location ==
The house is on land which was granted to the Russell family (previously thought not ancestors of the Russell Dukes of Bedford), by an early king, probably John, King of England (reigned 1199–1216) at the end of his reign, or his son Henry III of England. Kingston Russell manor is now part of Long Bredy parish, but earlier appears to have had its own church. The main part of the manor adjoins Winterbourne Abbas to the east and Compton Valence to the north, whilst the house itself adjoins Long Bredy. It is situated in an area known for ancient tumuli and the Kingston Russell Stone Circle. The Poor Lot barrow group forms a boundary with Littlebredy and Winterbourne Abbas.

== Toponymy ==
The Victoria County History of the County of Dorset (1908) notes that Little Bredy, of which Kingston Russell is a part, may have been the borough of Brydian in the Saxon period. It goes on to say that if Little Bredy is indeed the borough of Brydian then "It was ... important as guarding the one gap in the downs which connects south-east with south-west Dorset."

== The Russell family ==
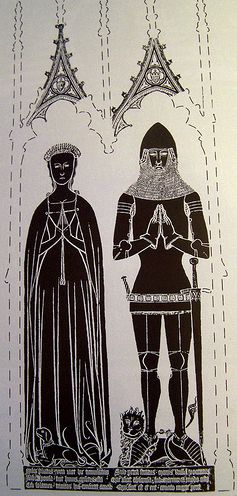
Sir Maurice Russell (1356-1416) of Dyrham and Kingston Russell and first wife Isabel Childrey. Rubbing from funerary brass at Dyrham Church. Note Russell armourials in small escutcheon in gable of canopy

Kingston Russell takes the second part of its name from the Russell family who were granted the manor for their service to the King. The manor was held in-chief from the King by Grand Serjeanty, the particular service performed for the King was originally as Marshal of the Buttery, as the entry in the Book of Fees dated 1211 records for the Hundred of "Alvredesberge" (since dissolved), Dorset:

Johannes Russel tenet Kingeston pro dimidia hyda terre de domino rege ex tempore Willelmi Bastard quondam Rege Anglie per serjanciam essendi marescallus buteilerie domini regis ad Natale Domini et ad Pentecosten.
John Russell holds Kingston for half a hide of land from the Lord King from the time of William the Bastard sometime King of England through the serjeanty of being marshall of the king's buttery (store of wine barrels) at Christmas and at Pentecost.

The serjeanty changed during the minority of King Henry III to the counting of the King's chessman and storing them away after a game. John Russell of Kingston Russell was a household knight of King Richard I from at the latest 1195 then also of his brother King John and then of his infant son King Henry III, of whose household he became steward. In the capacity of Household Knight he acted as part of the backbone of the king's army, as a temporary castellan, sheriff, diplomat and general trouble-shooter. He thus served as Constable of Sherborne Castle, and Governor of Corfe Castle, both in Dorset. He undertook an important diplomatic assignment in 1220 to recover Princess Joan, infant sister of Henry III, from the court of Hugh X of Lusignan to whom she had been betrothed and by whom then rejected. Russell died in 1224. He married Rose Bardolph, da. of Thomas Bardolph and widow of Henry de Pomeroy, feudal baron of the large barony of Berry Pomeroy in Devon, consisting of 32 knight's fees. The marriage to this widow of a tenant-in-chief was likely to have been a reward from the king for Russell's services, and brought Russell a life-interest in her large dower lands. John Russell was granted as a further royal mark of gratitude the marriage of one of the heiresses of James de Newmarch, feudal baron of North Cadbury, who had died in 1216 without male heir, leaving 2 infant heiresses, whose marriages became the property of the king by feudal custom. The wardship of the eldest daughter Isabelle was granted by King John to John Russell, who married her to his eldest surviving (3rd.) son Ralph, the marriage of the other daughter Hawise having been acquired by John de Bottrell/Bottreux. The Newmarch lands were thus split in half, one moiety consisting of nearly 17 knight's fees, in Gloucestershire (including Dyrham), Somerset, Buckinghamshire, Wiltshire and Berkshire going to the Russells, with the second half, including the caput of North Cadbury, being confirmed to Bottrell by Henry III in 1218, per the Close Rolls. Sir Ralph Russell continued to hold Kingston Russell from Henry III by Grand Serjeanty, viz "that he should present a cup of beer to our Sovereign Lord the King on the 4 principal feasts of the year" Sir Ralph Russell and Isabel's heir was Sir William Russell (1257–1311), Constable of Carisbrook Castle, Isle of Wight. He married Katherine de Aula, heiress of Yaverland, Isle of Wight (and possibly later Jane Peverell). On 12 July 1284 William was granted by King Edward I (1272–1307) a market and free warren as the following entry in the Charter Rolls records:

Grant to William son of Ralph Russel, and his heirs, of a weekly market on Thursday at his manor of Kyngeston Russel, co. Dorset, and of a yearly fair there on the vigil, the feast and the morrow of St. Matthew (i.e. 21st. September); grant also of free warren in the demesne lands of the said manor.

William died before his son and heir Theobald (1301–1340) had reached his majority of 21, and the infant Theobald was granted in wardship to Ralph III de Gorges, 1st Baron Gorges (d.1224) of Knighton, Isle of Wight and Wraxall, Somerset. Gorges married off the young Theobald to his 2nd daughter Eleanor. Gorge's son, Ralph IV, 2nd. Baron Gorges, found himself without his own male heir, with only three sisters as heiresses to his ancient and noble line. He thus made his nephew Theobald II Russell his heir, apparently with the provision that he should change his name to Gorges, bear the ancient Gorges armorials and inherit the bulk of the Gorges lands, including Wraxall, Somerset, 6 miles west of Bristol. Theobald Russell "Gorges" thus established a new line of Gorges at Wraxall, where the family became well established (see Sir Ferdinando Gorges). The eldest son of Theobald and Eleanor was Ralph (1319–1375), the second son being Theobald, who duly adopted the name Gorges and inherited his mother's lands at Wraxall and Bradpole, Dorset. Ralph his elder brother had as his heir Sir Maurice Russell (c.1352-1416) of Dyrham, Gloucestershire. To the latter, whose funerary brass can be seen at Dyrham Church, descended Kingston Russell, the manor and hundred of Redhove (Redhone) and Beminster Forum (Beaminster) in the manor of Bradpole, as well as the manor of Dyrham, Gloucestershire and Horsington, Somerset. By his first wife Isabel Childrey he had two daughters who on the death of his son Thomas in 1432 from his second marriage to Joan Dauntsey, became his co-heiresses. Margaret Russell (d. 1466) the eldest daughter had married firstly her father's neighbour Sir Gilbert Denys of Siston and thus Kingston Russell and Dyrham passed to the Denys family. The Denyses appear never to have lived at Kingston Russell.

== Heritage of Dukes of Bedford ==
Recent unverified research by Ancestry.com shows that Sir Theobald Russell (b. 1301) in North Cadbury, Somerset, England, and died (1340) was a direct ancestor of John Russell the first Earl of Bedford. Sir Theobald married Eleanor de Gorges on 1318. They had six children, Ralph (b. 1319), William (b. 1321), Theobald (b. 1323), John (b. 1325) Richard (b. 1327) and Elizabeth (b. 1330). Eleanor de Gorges was born on 1302 in Wraxall, Somerset, England, and died 1332/1333 on the Isle of Wight, Hampshire, England.

Sir Theobald Russell married Eleanor de la Tour (b. 1313 in Berwick, Dorset, England) in 1334. They had one child, William (b. 1335). William married NN. de Muschamp on 1362 in Kingston-Russell, Dorset. NN. de Muschamp the daughter and heiress of Muschamp was born in 1342 at Kingston Russell. They had one son Henry Russell born in 1363 at Kingston Russell. Henry Russell married NN. Godfrey in 1389 and their son John Russell (born in 1390) was the grandfather of a later John Russell, the first Earl of Bedford.

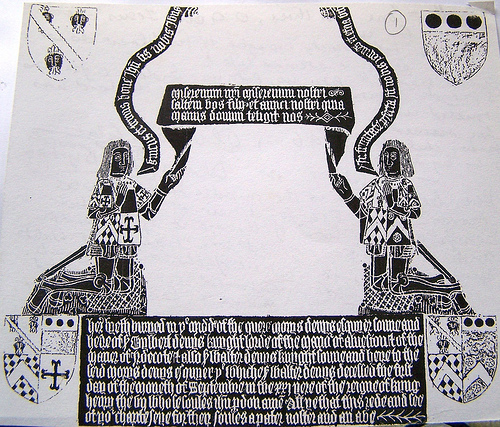
Denys monumental brass, 1505, Olveston Church. The arms of Russell of Kingston Russell are blazoned at top right: On a chief three bezants

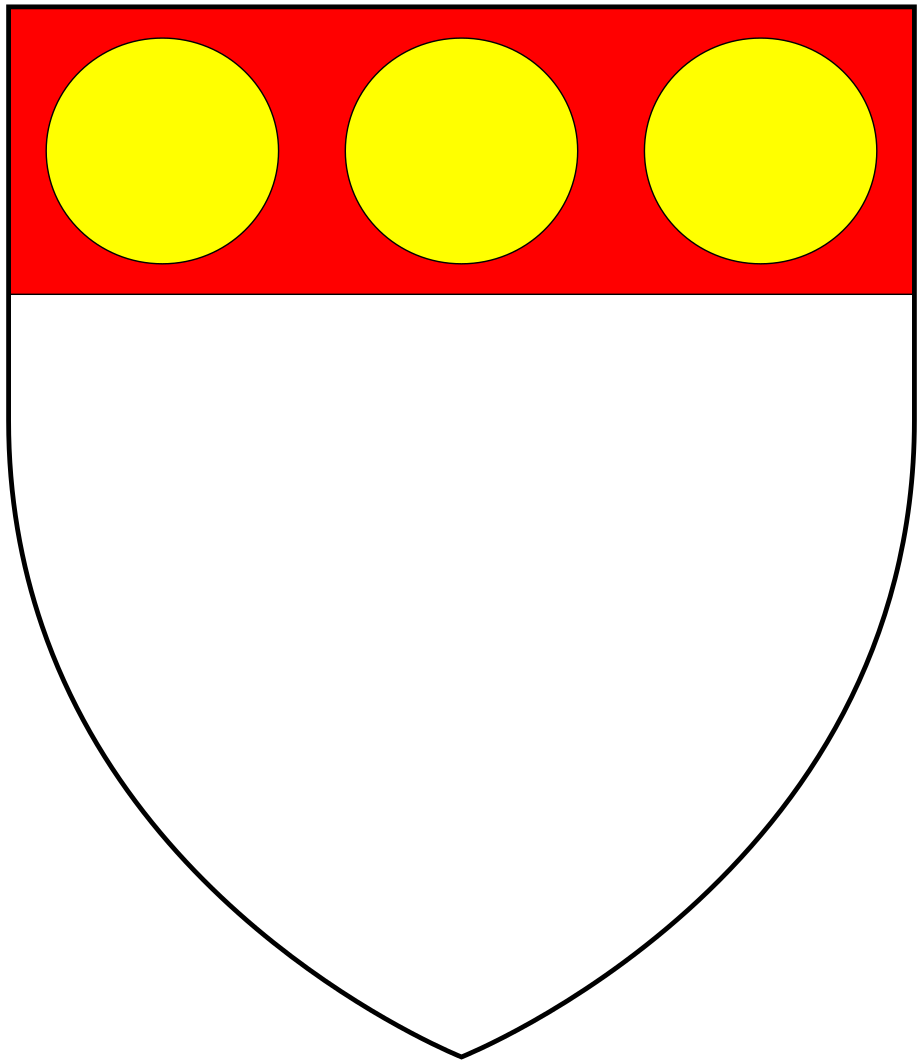
Arms of Russell of Dyrham & Kingston Russell

== Modern times ==
=== Early modern period ===
At some point possibly around the 1640s, part of the manor, including the house, came into the possession of the Michel family, who partly rebuilt the seventeenth century Kingston Russell House as it still stands today at the end of a long driveway. The Michel family also owned Dewlish House in Dewlish, Dorset and removed there sometime during the 1760s when the house was then let. Admiral Sir Thomas Hardy, 1st Baronet, Nelson's flag captain, was born at Kingston Russell on 5 April 1769, his mother being the daughter of Thomas Masterman of this place.

== Victorian and Edwardian eras ==
At some time before 1861 the Dukes of Bedford bought Kingston Russell for a second time, and when Lord John Russell (1792–1878) the prominent Liberal statesman, 3rd son of the 6th Duke of Bedford, was raised to the peerage as an earl on 30 July 1861, he chose the title Earl Russell of Kingston Russell, which title is still extant (the famous philosopher Bertrand Russell was the third earl of this title). In 1877, the famous American historian, John Lothrop Motley, author of 'The Rise of the Dutch Republic', died at Kingston Russell.

By the turn of the twentieth century however, the house was in a dilapidated condition and the estate was sold in 1913 to George Gribble. He and his wife Norah Royds had previously renovated Henlow Grange. The new owners - with architect Philip Tilden, who later worked for Winston Churchill - demolished a stub wing from the older Tudor building, extended the Carolean/Georgian wing by the addition of two small three-storey wings at either end of the original two-storey structure, and laid out the gardens. Their son Julian Royds Gribble won the Victoria Cross in the First World War, but died in a prisoner of war camp in 1918; the village hall was constructed as a gift to the village, in memory of him. The Gribble family moved away in the 1920s.

== Present day ==
Since then, the house has had a number of different owners. From 1984 to 2024 it was owned by Dr H. H. J. Carter & Miss T. Silkstone, who are the longest continuous owner-occupiers of the house since the 1760s. In 2024 the house was passed to Samuel Carter and Francesca Wilson. The house is not open to the public, though it has welcomed visitors from bodies such as the Georgian Group.

The house appears as Norland Park in the 2026 film of Sense and Sensibility directed by Georgia Oakley.

== Chapel of St. James ==
A small chapel dedicated to St. James once stood nearby. It is reputed to have been built by the Russells and was financed by them through tithes and the glebe in Pitcombe. The last rector of the chapel was Roger Bond who was appointed to it, along with Little Bredy in 1531. The inhabitants then used the church at Long Bredy for burials. After its closure it was leased variously. In 1565 it was granted to Edith Cole, widow and John and Joan Martin, her children for their lives. It was then granted to John, Henry and William Mintern for their lives from 1585, then in 1605 to Fenton, esq. captain of the guard, and 1607 to George Ward. The chapel of St James then came to the Mellers of Little Bredy who sold the tithes and part of the glebe to the Michels. By this time the chapel was in ruins and in John Hutchins' time only the walls remained. During the time of the Michels residence of the manor, according to Hutchins, it was inhabited by poor people.

== Sources ==
- Scott-Thomson, Gladys, F.R.H.S. Two Centuries of Family History, London, 1930. A study of the Bed, Historical Memoirs of the House of Russell from the Time of the Norman Conq
- Round, J. Horace, Studies in Peerage & Family History, London, 1901, vol.2, pp.250-279, "The Origin of the Russells". A severe and detailed critique of the work of Wiffen.
- Gorges, Raymond. History of the Family of Gorges ("The Story of a Family through Eleven Centuries Illustrated by Portraits and Pedigrees Being a History of the Family of Gorges"), Boston USA, 1944. Extensive research on the Russell family.
- Church, S.D. The Household Knights of King John, Cambridge, 1999
- Pitt-Rivers, Michael, 1968. Dorset. London: Faber & Faber.
- "Kingston Russell & the Russell Family". Weymouth, Dorset, England.
- Barron, Oswald (1911). "Russell (family)" . In Chisholm, Hugh (ed.). Encyclopædia Britannica. Vol. 23 (11th ed.). Cambridge University Press. pp. 861–862.
