= Julian Royds Gribble =

Recipient of the Victoria Cross

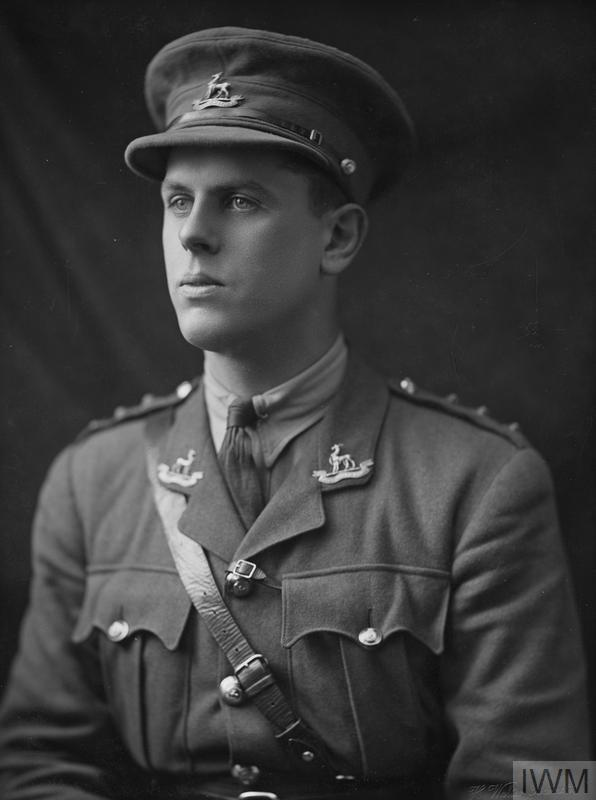
- Born: 5 January 1897; London, England
- Died: 25 November 1918 (aged 21); Kassel, German Empire
- Burial place: Niederzwehren Cemetery, Kassel
- Military career
- Allegiance: United Kingdom
- Branch: British Army
- Service years: 1915−1918
- Rank: Captain
- Units: Royal Warwickshire Regiment
- Conflicts: World War I
- Awards: Victoria Cross

Captain Julian Royds Gribble VC (5 January 1897 − 25 November 1918) was a British Army officer and an English recipient of the Victoria Cross (VC), the highest and most prestigious award for gallantry in the face of the enemy that can be awarded to British and Commonwealth forces.

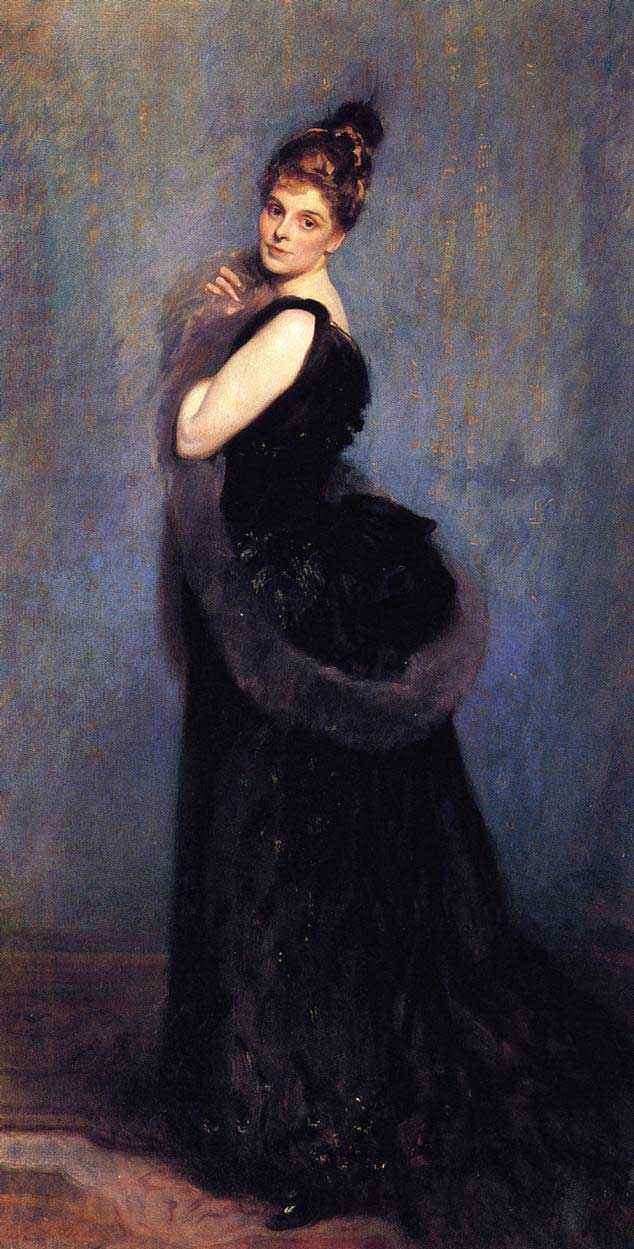
Mrs George Gribble (Norah Royds), John Singer Sargent, 1888.

== Life ==
Born to George James Gribble and Norah Gribble (née Royds) of 34 Eaton Square in London. His siblings included Vivien Gribble, a wood engraver, who spent World War I in the Women's Land Army.

He was 21 years old, and a temporary captain in the 10th (S) Battalion, The Royal Warwickshire Regiment, British Army during the First World War when he performed a deed for which he was awarded the Victoria Cross on 23 March 1918 at Beaumetz, Hermies Ridge, France.

== Citation ==
For most conspicuous bravery and devotion to duty. Capt. Gribble was in command of the right company of the battalion when the enemy attacked, and his orders were to ' hold on to the last.' His company was eventually entirely isolated, though he could easily have withdrawn them at one period when the rest of the battalion on his left were driven back to a secondary position. His right flank was ' in the air,' owing to the withdrawal of all troops of a neighbouring division. By means of a runner to the company on his left rear he intimated his determination to hold on until other orders were received from battalion headquarters - and this he inspired his command to accomplish. His company was eventually surrounded by the enemy at close range, and he was seen fighting to the last. His subsequent fate is unknown. By his splendid example of grit, Capt. Gribble was materially instrumental in preventing for some hours the enemy obtaining a complete mastery of the crest of ridge, and by his magnificent self-sacrifice he enabled the remainder of his own brigade to be withdrawn, as well as another garrison and three batteries of field artillery.

— The London Gazette, No. 30770, 25 June 1918

== Death ==
He was taken prisoner and died of pneumonia at the Niederzwehren prisoner of war camp in Germany, aged 21. Although he died 14 days after the end of the war, systems were not yet in place to repatriate those held prisoner.

He is commemorated on the War Memorial at Long Bredy in Dorset, close to Kingston Russell House, which had been purchased by his father in 1913. His sister Vivien designed a memorial window for him at Preston, Hertfordshire.

== The medal ==
His VC was destroyed in a house fire and no replacement has been issued.
