= Hellstone =

Hellstone can refer to:

- Hell Stone, a dolmen in England
- Helstone, a hamlet in north Cornwall

== See also ==
- Helston, a town and civil parish in Cornwall, England
