= The Grey Mare and her Colts =

Long Barrow in Dorset, England

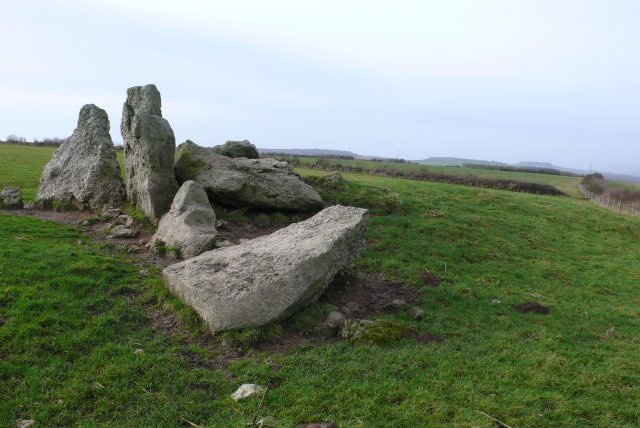
- The long barrow in 2009

- Location in England, United Kingdom
- 50.68161°N 2.58946°W
- Type: Long barrow
- Location: England, United Kingdom

History
- Built: c. 2900 BC

Site notes
- Material: Stone

Scheduled monument
- Official name: The Grey Mare and her Colts
- Designated: 1922
- Reference no.: 450303

The Grey Mare and her Colts is a megalithic chambered long barrow located near Abbotsbury in Dorset, England. It was built during the Early and Middle Neolithic periods (3400-2400 BC). The tomb was partially excavated in the early nineteenth century, and was found to contain human bones and several pottery fragments.

== Description ==
The chambered long barrow is located near the village of Abbotsbury, in Dorset, England. It is situated at the head of a dry valley in the parish of Long Bredy. The monument is part of a group of similar monuments spread across the South Dorset Ridgeway. The remains of another tomb, the Hell Stone, is 2 km to the east; while the Kingston Russell Stone Circle is around 1 km to the northwest. The Grey Mare and her Colts is accessible using an Ordnance Survey map.

The burial monument today is a nearly rectangular mound, 24 m long, 1 m high, and tapering in width from 13 m wide at the southeast end of the tomb to 8 m wide at the northwest end. The remnants of the burial chamber are located at the southeast end of the mound. To the south east end of the mound are four enormous Sarsen stones, three standing and one lying flat. Another horizontal slab behind the tomb is believed to be the capstone of the collapsed burial chamber. There are several small upright stones positioned at the perimeter of the mound. Evidence suggests that these stones are the remnants of the barrow's retaining kerb.

== History ==
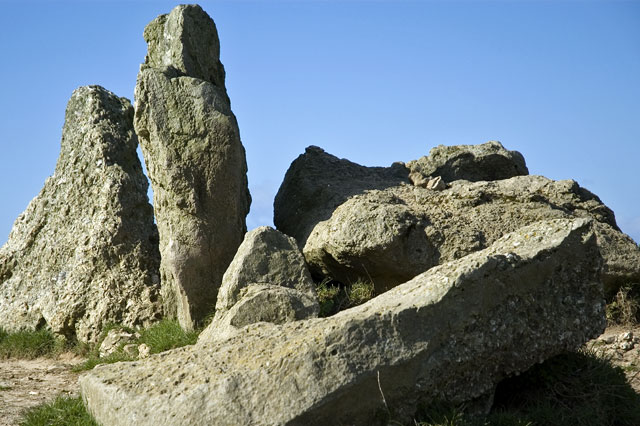
The Grey Mare tomb

Long barrowed megalithic tombs are burial monuments built during the Early and Middle Neolithic periods (3400-2400 BC). They can be identified as mounds of stone or earth and typically hold one or more wood or stone-lined burial chambers. They can be up to 90 m long. They represent the burial places of Britain's early farming communities. Over 300 chambered tombs have been recorded in Britain. An excellent example of a chambered long barrow is West Kennet Long Barrow in Wiltshire. The Grey Mare and her Colts burial monument was partially excavated in the early nineteenth century. It was found to contain human bones and several pottery fragments.
