= Nicholas de Moels =

13th-century Anglo-Norman knight

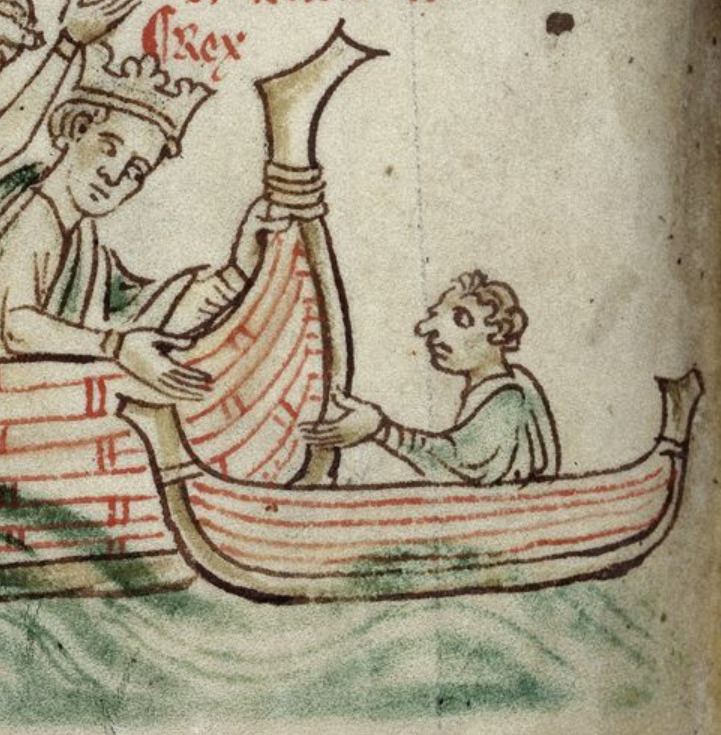
Nicholas de Moels, Seneschal of Gascony, in a small boat bidding farewell to King Henry III as he sails back to England in 1243. Detail of illumination by Matthew Paris.

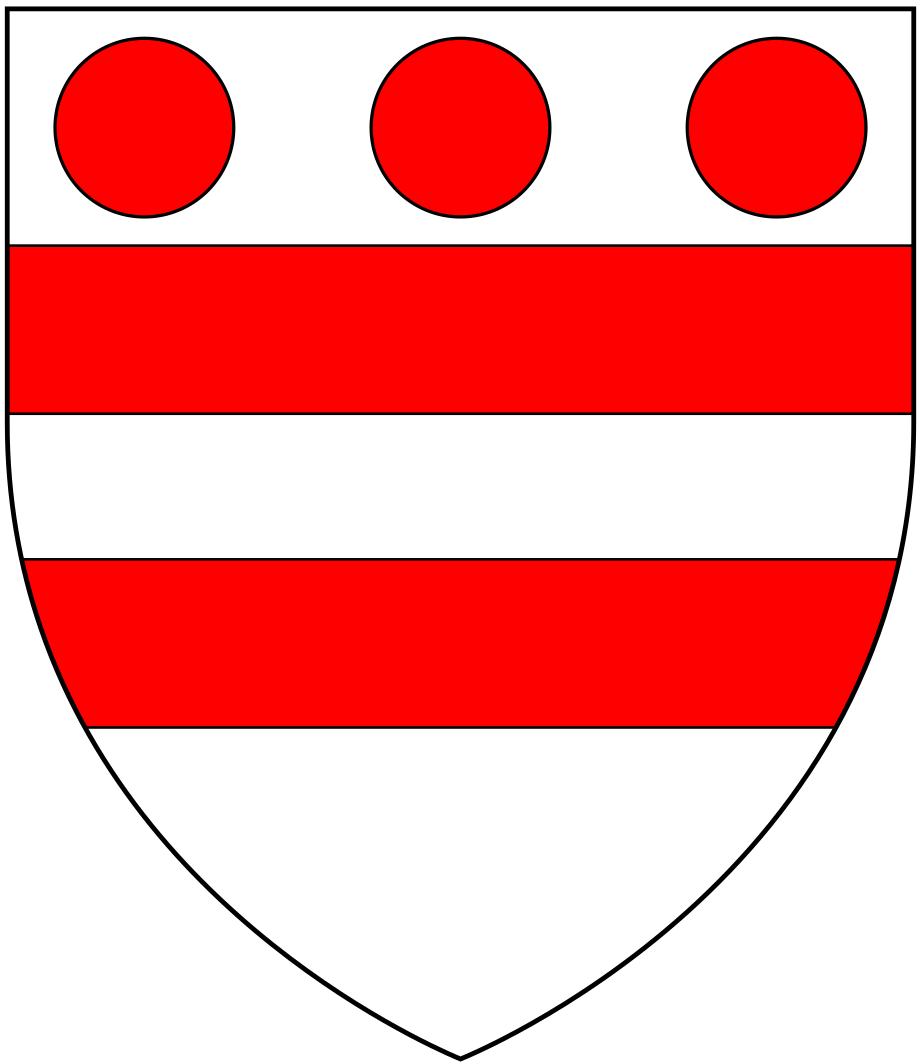
Canting arms of Nicol' de Moels, from the Glover Roll: "d'argent od deux barres de gules ovec trois moeles de gules en le chief" (Argent, two bars gules in chief three torteaux).

Nicholas de Moels or Nicholas Molis (c. 1195 – 1268 or 1269) was an Anglo‑Norman royal administrator and household knight of King Henry III of England. (Note: Described in 1229 as miles noster familiaris ("our familial knight").) In this capacity he was assigned many and varied offices and duties, often of a temporary nature. He married a wealthy heiress from North Cadbury in Somerset which transformed him into a major landholder and feudal baron. In 1244 whilst serving as Seneschal of Gascony, he inflicted a defeat on the King of Navarre, whom he took prisoner in the field.

== Origins ==
His parentage is unknown. His surname appears to derive from the Norman manor of Meulles in Calvados, south-west of Orbec, in the Diocese of Lisieux. Devonshire historian Tristram Risdon (d. 1640) stated that he "descended of an ancient lineage in this shire" but provided no further detail. One of the many tenants of Devonshire baron Baldwin de Meulles (d. 1090), a Domesday Book tenant in chief, was a certain "Roger de Moles", who held from him at least the two manors or estates of Lew Trenchard and Waddlescot / Warson. (Note: The Domesday Book, Devon (Thorn & Thorn 1985) translates "Roger de Moles" as Roger of Meulles in Calvados. The Complete Peerage (Cokayne 1936) adds two further estates: Teign in Ashton, and Pennycot.) His successor in 1066 was a Joel de Moels. In 1242, as recorded in the Book of Fees, Lew Trenchard and Waddlescot were held by a certain "John de Molis" from John de Courtenay, feudal baron of Okehampton, who had inherited much of the land formerly held by Baldwin de Meulles. This John de Molis, perhaps a brother of Nicholas, would also hold Lashbrook, Dornaford, Exbourn and Highampton, which had been held by a Roger de Molis in 1086.

Nicholas was born about 1195 and appears to have spent some of his early life in the court of King John of England (1199–1216), whose son King Henry III (1216–1272) he would later serve.

== Career ==
During the reign of Henry III, Nicholas served as Sheriff of Hampshire (1228–1232), Sheriff of Devon (1234), and Sheriff of Yorkshire (1239–1242), and also as Constable of Winchester Castle, Pembroke Castle, Haverfordwest Castle, Cilgerran Castle, Tenby Castle, Rochester Castle (1247), Canterbury Castle (1247) and Corfe Castle. He was also Governor of the Channel Islands.

=== Seneschal of Gascony ===
The contemporary Benedictine monk Matthew Paris wrote as follows concerning events in 1243:

Unde cito post contigit quod cum rex a Burdegali recessurus custodemque quem senescallum vocant, ei idoneum, videlicet Nicholaum de Molis, providisset, jam jamque omnia ad custodiam terrae provide pro curasset, et ascensa nave, alta freti velificando versus Angliam jam sulcasset orta excogitati scismatis inter ipsos Wasconienses occasione rex missis galeis festinanter revocaretur et redire cogeretur ut exortus gravissimus conflictus ibidem sedaretur.

Which may be translated as follows:

"And it happened soon after, that when the king was about to leave Bordeaux, and had appointed Nicholas de Molis as a fit person to act as governor, whom they call seneschal, and had taken all precautions for the safety of the land, and had embarked, and was even ploughing the depths of the sea, sailing towards England, a furious quarrel having arisen among those Gascons, the king was hastily recalled by galleys sent after him, and compelled to return, that he might quell the great disturbance which had arisen".

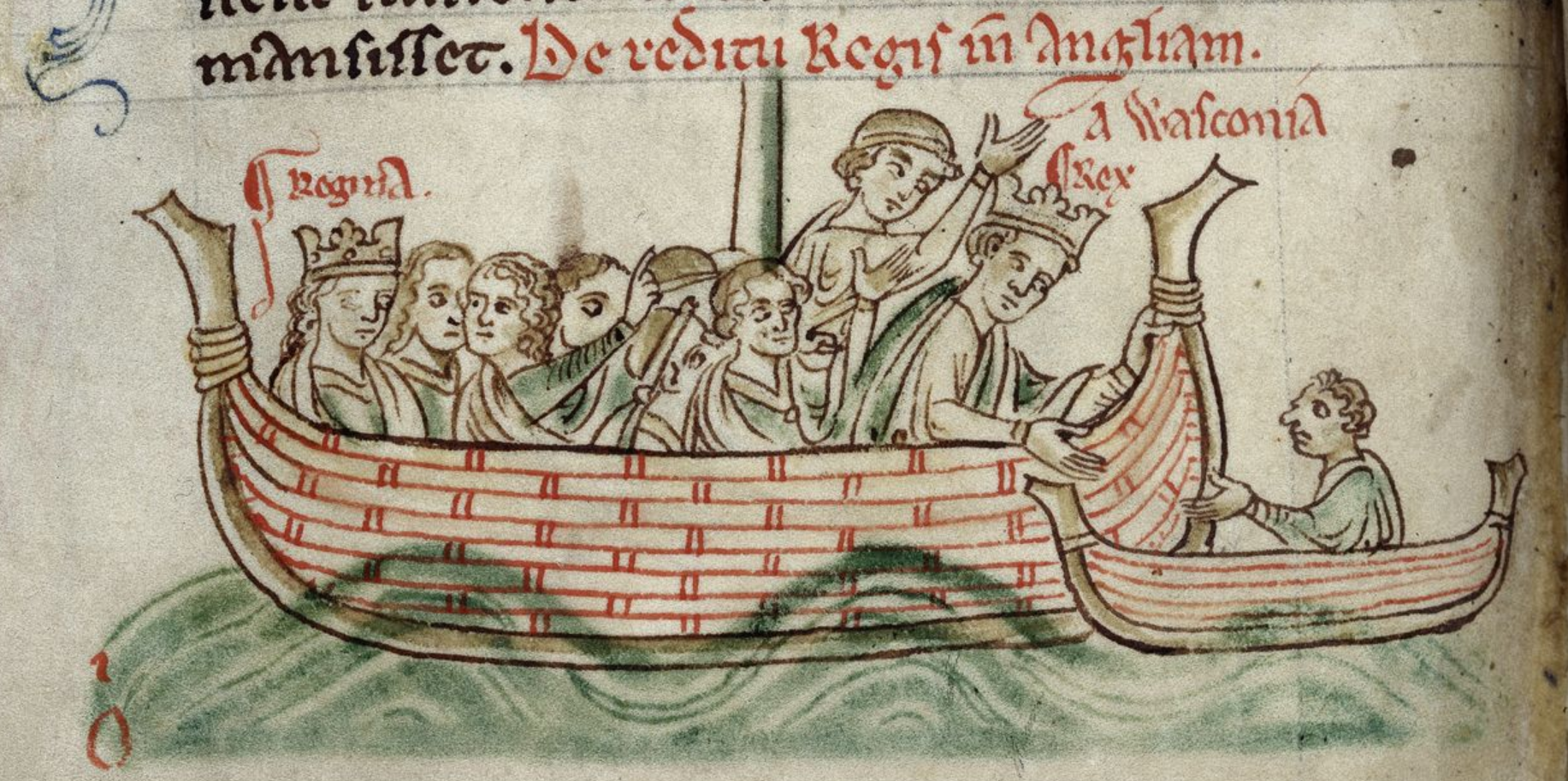
De reditu regis in Angliam a Wasconia ("Concerning the return of the king to England from Gascony") King Henry III and Queen Eleanor returning by sea from Gascony in 1243, with Nicholas de Moels, Seneschal of Gascony, in a small boat alongside bidding him farewell. Illumination by Matthew Paris (1200–1259) in Chronica Majora (Royal 14 C VII f. 134v)

In September 1243, Henry III left Gascony to return to England, having on 17 June 1243 appointed Nicholas de Moels as Seneschal of Gascony, as related by Matthew Paris in his Chronica Majora, (Note: The Complete Peerage (Cokayne 1936) quoting Chronicles and memorials of Great Britain and Ireland during the Middle Ages (Paris 1872).) with a marginal illustration of the King and Queen on board a ship with a man in a small boat alongside, apparently de Moels seeing him off. (Note: Caption per British Library on-line illustration.) The Latin text following the illustration is as follows:

De reditu regis in Angliam de Pictavia et Wasconia. Eisdem quoque temporibus, scilicet circa festum Sancti Remigii, rex Angliae, dispositis in Wasconia disponendis commissaque custodia terrae Nicholao de Molis, militi strenuissimo et circumspecto, quem praefecit Wasconiae senescallum, naves ascendens, prospere velificando redeundo in Angliam, transfretavit et septimo kalendas octobris apud Portesmues applicuit.

Translated as:

"At that time also, namely about the feast of St Remy, the King of England, having settled what was to be settled in Gascony, and having intrusted the government of the land to Nicholas de Molis, a very brave and prudent soldier, whom he created seneschal of Gascony, and taking ship, had a most pleasant voyage across the Channel, and returned into England; he landed at Portsmouth on the 25th of September".

In 1244, de Moels inflicted a defeat on Theobald I, King of Navarre, capturing him in person on a battlefield in Gascony, according to the Devonshire historian Tristram Risdon (d. 1640). He was relieved of that office, with commendation for his service, in July 1245.

The event is related as follows by Matthew Paris:

Nicholaus de Moles senescallus Wasconiae contra regem Navariae dimicans ad votum triumphavit: Anni ipsius eodem tempore Nicholaus de Molis Wasconiae senescallus quem rex a Wasconia ibidem terrae suae custodem constituerat contra regem Navariae guerram viriliter continuans ad votum in quodam casu inito certamine triumphavit.

Which may be translated:

"Of the victory gained by Nicholas de Molis, seneschal of Gascony. About this time of the year, Nicholas de Molis, seneschal of Gascony, whom the king, on leaving that country, had appointed governor of that province, and who had been carrying on a fierce war against the king of Navarre, was favoured by fortune in one engagement, and gained a victory over him".

=== Return to England ===
Nicholas returned to England to fight in the Welsh wars and was made governor of Caernarvon Castle and Cardigan Castle. He was made Constable of Dover Castle in 1246, Sheriff of Kent in 1247 and Lord Warden of the Cinque Ports in 1258.

== Landholdings ==
Many of the gifts of land he received from the king were temporary in nature, comprising lands forfeited by other landholders but later restored to them. In 1217 he was granted a lease of the manor of Watlington in Oxfordshire "for his sustenance in the king's service". In 1226 he was granted Little Berkhamstead, which was later confirmed to him in fee. After his marriage in 1230 to Hawise de Newmarch, heiress of North Cadbury and many other manors, he became a major landholder in his own right. He continued to receive royal grants. In 1230 he was granted the royal demesne manors of King's Carswell and Diptford in Devon. In 1250 or 1251 he was granted free warren in his manors of Cadbury and nearby Mapperton in Dorset.

== Personal life ==
In or after 1230, Nicholas married Hawise de Newmarch (as her second husband), widow of John de Botreaux (whom she had married in 1218) and younger daughter and co-heiress of James de Newmarch (d. 1216), feudal baron of North Cadbury in Somerset. Hawise's sister, Isabel de Newmarch, married Ralph Russell (died c. 1250), son of her guardian Sir John Russell (died c. 1224) of Kingston Russell in Dorset, who was also a household knight of King John and of the young King Henry III to whom he also acted as steward.

Nicholas and Hawise had several children, including:

- James de Moels (d. March 1252 or 1253), eldest son and heir apparent who predeceased his father. In 1243 he was assigned to be educated with Prince Edward, son of King Henry III.
- Roger de Moels (c. 1233 or 1237–1294), second but eldest surviving son and heir, Marshal of the Army and Governor of Lampsdervour Castle in Ceredigion. His second son was John de Moels, 1st Baron Moels (d. 1310).
- Agnes de Moels (born 1230), born at Cadbury, the second wife of William de Braose, 1st Baron Braose, feudal baron of Bramber and Gower.
- Maud de Moels (born c. 1258)1258, married Richard de L'Orti, or de Urtiaco, heir to the barony of Stoke Trister, Somerset.

Nicholas de Moels died between November 1268 and 24 June 1269.

== Bibliography ==
=== Books and journals ===
- Bates, Reverend Edward Harbin (1896). Murray, Richard Paget (ed.). Proceedings of the Somersetshire Archaeological and Natural History Society (PDF). Part II — Papers, etc. The Family of De Urtiaco. Vol. 42. Taunton: Somerset Archaeological and Natural History Society. Barnicott and Pearce. OCLC 852187751. Archived (PDF) from the original on 27 February 2020.
- Cartwright, Edmund (1830). "Pedigree of Braose". In Dallaway, James (ed.). The Parochial Topography of the Rape of Bramber. A History of the Western Division of the County of Sussex. Part 2. Vol. 2. London: J. B. Nichols & Son, T. Bentley. hdl:2027/umn.31951d005732196. OCLC 558716876.
- Cokayne, George Edward (1936). Doubleday, Sir Herbert Arthur; Scott-Ellis, Thomas Evelyn; Gibbs, Sir Vicary (eds.). The Complete Peerage, or a history of the House of Lords and all its members from the earliest times (Moels to Nuneham). Vol. 9 (2 ed.). London: The St Catherine Press Limited. OCLC 642569832.
- Cokayne, George Edward (1945). Doubleday, Sir Herbert Arthur; Scott-Ellis, Thomas Evelyn; Gibbs, Sir Vicary (eds.). The Complete Peerage, or a history of the House of Lords and all its members from the earliest times (Oakham to Richmond). Vol. 10 (2 ed.). London: The St Catherine Press Limited. OCLC 642569832.
- Keats-Rohan, K.S.B. (1999). Domesday People: A Prosopographaphy of Persons Occurring in English Documents, 1066-1166. I. Domesday Book. Woodbridge: The Boydell Press. ISBN 0-85115-722-X.
- Kingsford, Charles Lethbridge (1894). Lee, Sidney (ed.). Dictionary of National Biography. Milman to More. Vol. 38. London: Macmillan and Co. OCLC 1067055902.
- Lobel, Mary Doreen, ed. (1964). "Parishes: Watlington". Victoria history of the County of Oxford Lewknor and Pyrton Hundreds. Vol. 8. Victoria County History. Oxford: Institute of Historical Research by Oxford University Press. OCLC 655920572.
- Paris, Matthew (1852). Giles, Reverend John Allen (ed.). Matthew Paris's English history. Translated from the Latin. 1235–1273. Vol. 1. London: Henry George Bohn. OCLC 561709608.
- Paris, Matthew (1853). Giles, Reverend John Allen (ed.). Matthew Paris's English history. Translated from the Latin. 1235–1273. Vol. 2. London: Henry George Bohn. OCLC 561709608.
- Paris, Matthew (1872). "Matthæi Parisiensis, monachi Sancti Albani, Chronica majora" [The Chronicles of Matthew Paris, monk of St Albans]. In Luard, Henry Richards (ed.). Rerum Britannicarum Medii Aevi Scriptores [Chronicles and memorials of Great Britain and Ireland during the Middle Ages]. 1240–1247. Vol. 4. Roger of Wendover. London: Published by the authority of Her Majesty's Treasury, under the direction of the Master of the Rolls. Longman & Co. OCLC 2150326.
- Reichel, Reverend Oswald Joseph (1913). Amery, John Sparke (ed.). Devon and Cornwall Notes & Queries. Vol. 7. Exeter, England: James G. Commin. pp. 91–95. OCLC 867851649.
- Risdon, Tristram (1811). The chorographical description or survey of the county of Devon (updated ed.). Plymouth: Rees and Curtis. hdl:2027/mdp.39015009157010. OCLC 1015503608. "Printed from a genuine copy of the original manuscript; with considerable additions."
- Rogers, William Henry Hamilton (1902). "Moels‑Botreaux, of North Cadbury, Somerset". Archaeological papers relating to the counties of Somerset, Wilts, Hants, and Devon. hdl:2027/uc2.ark:/13960/t9668q53m. OCLC 33974916.
- Sanders, Ivor John (1960). "North Cadbury". English baronies: a study of their origin and descent, 1086–1327. Oxford: Clarendon Press. OCLC 185526779.
- Thorn, Caroline; Thorn, Frank (1985). Morris, John; Thorn, Caroline; Thorn, Frank (eds.). Domesday Book. Devon. History from the sources. Vol. 9 (New Edition (1 Jun. 1985) ed.). Chichester: Phillimore Press. ISBN 978-0850334920. OCLC 466258038.

=== Web ===
- Paris, Matthew & British Library (1250). "Historia Anglorum, Chronica majora, Part III; Continuation of Chronica majora". www.bl.uk. St Albans. f. 134v. "Detail of a marginal drawing of Henry III and Eleanor returning by sea from Gascony, with Nicholas de Molis is in a small boat alongside."
- Summerson, Henry (2010). "Moels [Meulles, Molis], Sir Nicholas de (d. 1268/9), soldier and diplomat". Oxford Dictionary of National Biography (online ed.). Oxford: Oxford University Press. doi:10.1093/ref:odnb/18873. ISBN 978-0-19-861412-8. (Subscription or UK public library membership required.)

Preceded by Roger Northwode	Lord Warden of the Cinque Ports; 1258	Succeeded by Richard de Grey
