= Long Bredy =

Village in Dorset, England

Coordinates: 50.7082°N 2.6118°W

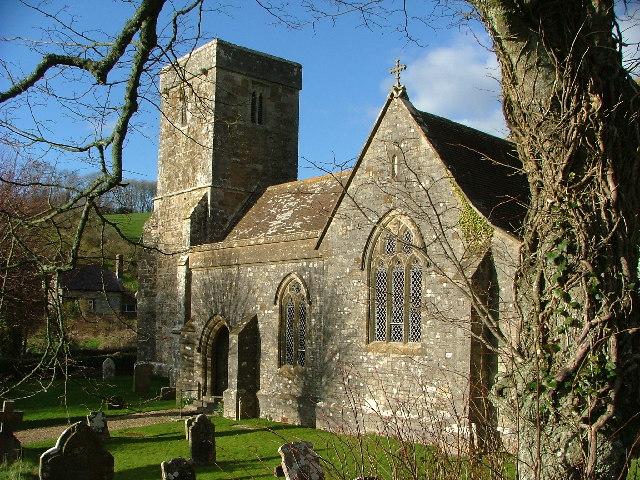
- St Peter's church, Long Bredy

- Location within Dorset
- Population: 208
- OS grid reference: SY569903
- Civil parish: Long Bredy and Kingston Russell
- Unitary authority: Dorset
- Ceremonial county: Dorset
- Region: South West
- Country: England
- Sovereign state: United Kingdom
- Post town: Dorchester
- Postcode district: DT2
- Police: Dorset
- Fire: Dorset and Wiltshire
- Ambulance: South Western
- UK Parliament: West Dorset

Long Bredy is a village in the civil parish of Long Bredy and Kingston Russell, in the county of Dorset in south-west England, situated approximately 7 miles (11 km) west of the county town Dorchester. It is sited in the valley of the small River Bride, beneath chalk hills of the Dorset Downs. In the 2011 census the parish had a population of 208. On 1 April 2024 the parish was abolished and merged with Kingston Russell to form "Long Bredy and Kingston Russell".

The environs of Long Bredy have some prehistoric history, including a burial chamber known as The Grey Mare and her Colts. The village itself is thought to have been established around the 9th century, and in 1086 was recorded in the Domesday Book as 'Langebride', which would have been pronounced 'Langabridda'. To the east of the village is Kingston Russell house, a 17th-century mansion.

Bottle Knap Cottage, owned by the National Trust, is a Grade II listed building. In May 2013 human skeletal remains were discovered near the cottage which dated back to approximately 800 to 600 BC, according to radiocarbon dating. Martin Papworth, an archaeologist with the National Trust, said, "The remains are of three teenage or young adults, probably crouched, are all from around the period when the first iron was being used in this country. No other burials in Dorset have been identified from this time."

== Notable people ==
- George Richards (died 1746) Member of Parliament for Bridport was born in Long Bredy.
