= Dyrham =

Village in Gloucestershire, England

Coordinates: 51°29′N 2°22′W

Location of Dyrham, Gloucestershire

Dyrham is a village and parish in South Gloucestershire, England.

== Location and communications ==
Dyrham is at lat. 51° 29' north, long. 2° 22' west (grid reference ST37381757). It lies at an altitude of 100 metres above sea level. It is near the A46 trunk road, about 6.5 miles (10.5 km) north of Bath and a little south of the M4 motorway. The Cotswold Way long-distance footpath runs through the village.

== Administration ==
Dyrham is administered by the civil parish of Dyrham & Hinton and by the unitary authority of South Gloucestershire. The population of this parish was 296 at the 2011 census.

== Etymology ==
The name of Dyrham is first attested in the Anglo-Saxon Chronicle, which took its present form in the later ninth century, and in tenth-century charters, as Deorham. This name it thought to derive from the Old English words dēor ("wild animal, deer") and hamm ("enclosed land, river meadow"). Thus it probably once meant "deer enclosure".

== History ==
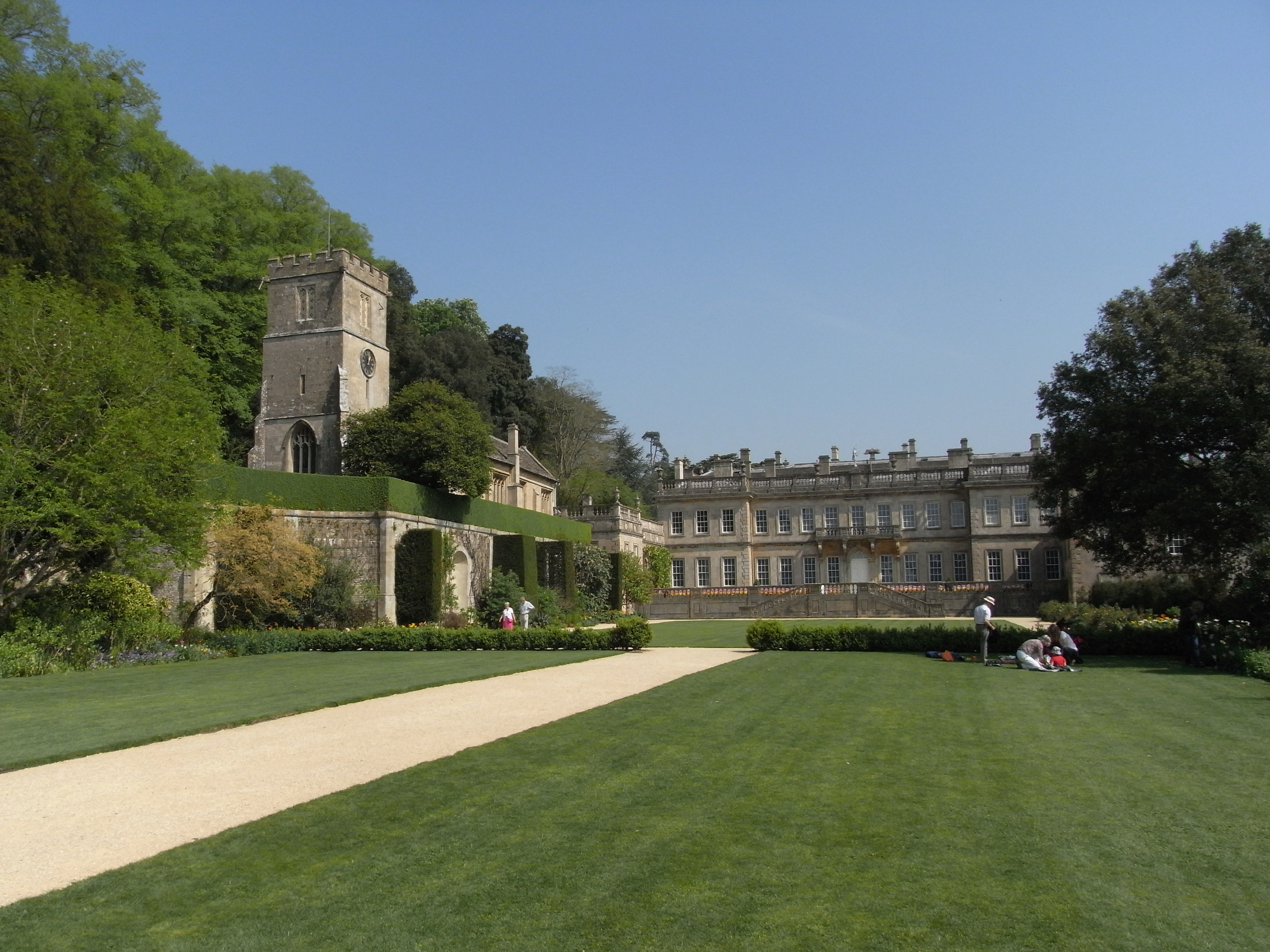
St Peter's Church, parish church of Dyrham. Next to it has stood for many centuries the manor house of Dyrham, the present incarnation of which, Dyrham Park (pictured), dates from the reign of William & Mary, and is thought to incorporate some of the structure of the ancient home of the Russells. In this church can be seen the funerary brass of Sir Maurice Russell(d.1416)

Dyrham is thought to have been the location of a battle portrayed in the Anglo-Saxon Chronicle as taking place in 577 CE between the West Saxons under Ceawlin and Cuthwine, and the Britons of the West Country. The outcome of the battle was supposedly a decisive win for the West Saxons, allowing them to colonise three important cities, Glevum (Gloucester), Corinium (Cirencester) and Aquae Sulis (Bath). The historicity of this event is uncertain, but Dyrham was evidently at least imagined as its site.

The Domesday Book of 1086 records the tenant-in-chief of Dyrham as William FitzWido who held seven hides in Dyrham, formerly the land of Aluric. The manor passed to the Norman magnate Wynebald de Ballon, and then via the Newmarch family to the Russell family, notably being held by John Russell (died c.1224) and William Russell (1257–1311). By the 15th century the manor had passed into the Denys family, the most notable holder being William Denys (1470–1533). After the family accumulated debts in the 16th century, the manor was sold to the Wynter family and then the Blathwayte family, who built the present mansion known as Dyrham Park, which is said to incorporate some of the structure of the earlier manor house.

== Nearby features ==
- Dyrham Park. At the edge of the village is Dyrham Park, a spectacular mansion in 274 acres (1.11 km^{2}) of parkland built between 1691 and 1702 for William Blathwayt (William III's Secretary of State and at War) and now owned by the National Trust. Dyrham Park was used as the set for the 1993 Merchant Ivory film The Remains of the Day and also for a BBC production of Dracula.
- Dyrham Wood. A woodland named Dyrham Wood lies about a mile to the south of the village.
- Lower Ledge Farm, south of the village, is where the new Farbio GTS sports car was made.
