= Hell Stone =

Dolmen in England

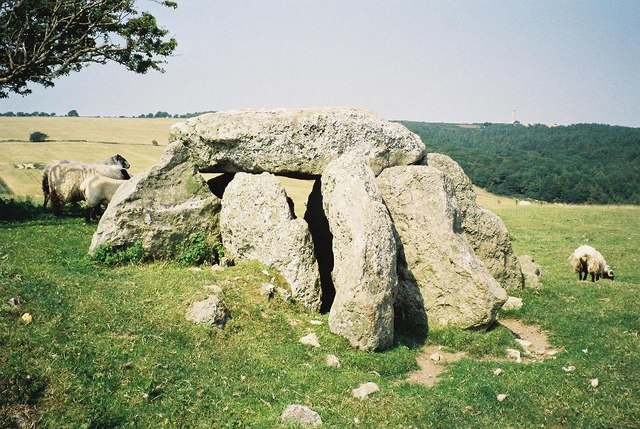

- Location within Dorset
- 50°40′43″N 2°33′33″W
- Type: Dolmen
- Location: Dorset
- OS grid reference: SY604868

Scheduled monument
- Official name: Helstone burial chamber
- Reference no.: 1002693

The Hell Stone is a badly-restored Neolithic dolmen on Portesham Hill in Dorset, England. It is just to the north of the village of Portesham, and approximately three-quarters of a mile (1.2 km) southeast of the Valley of Stones.

== Description ==
The Hell Stone is situated at the head of a dry valley system in the parish of Portesham. The burial chamber is at the southeast end of a rectangular mound. The mound is 24 metres (79 ft) long and orientated northwest to southeast. The mound tapers from 12 to 8 metres (39 to 26 ft) in width from the southeast end to the northwest end, and it is 1 metre (3 ft 3 in) high. The site has been designated as a scheduled monument.

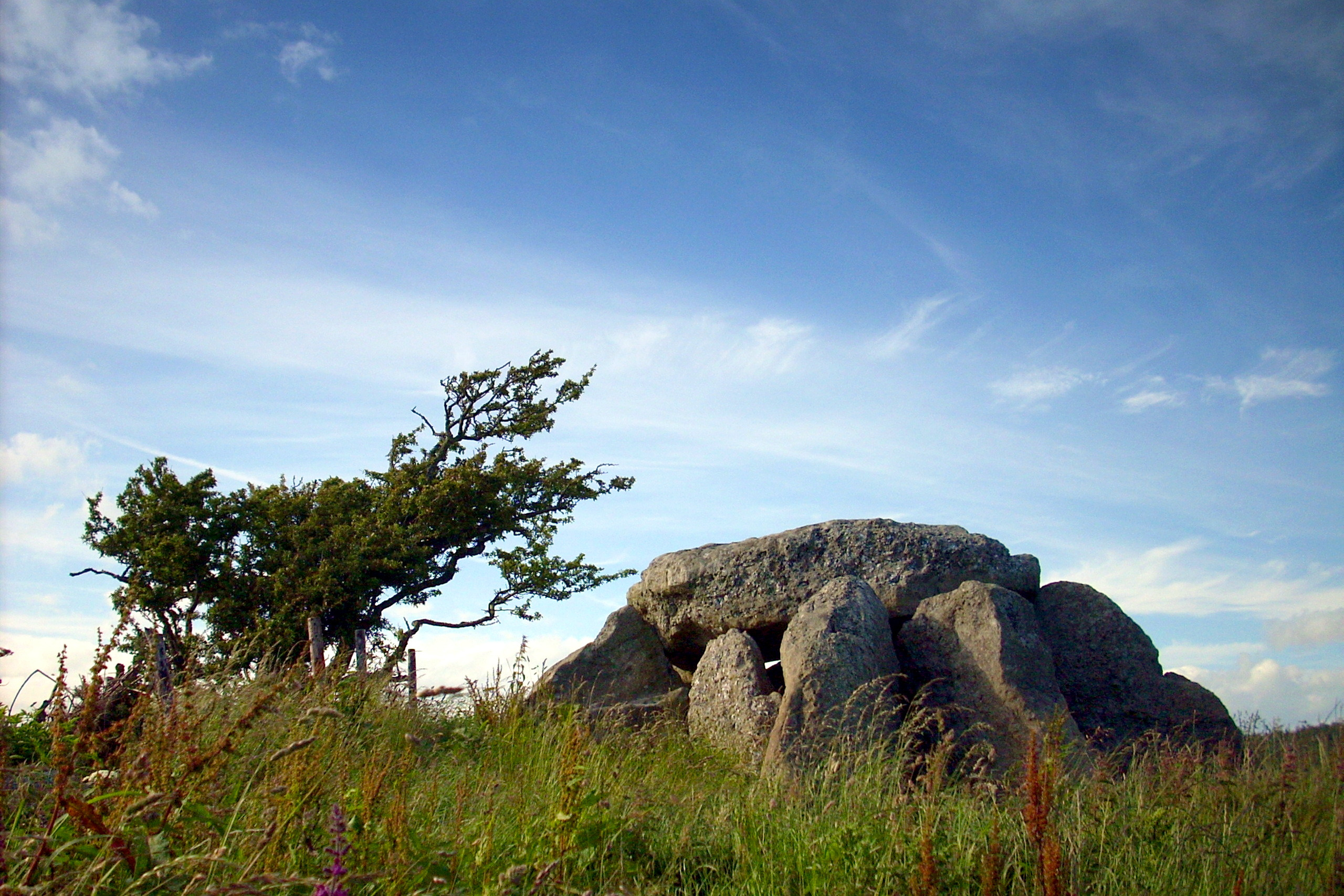
The Hell Stone

The chamber was badly restored in 1866 when eight men re-erected the stones, arranging them radially "rather like the slices of a cake" and supporting a large capstone. The chamber may have been, originally, a long rectangular one. A drystone wall runs across the mound, and a pond for watering livestock was dug close to the southeast end of the mound in modern times. The remains of another tomb, The Grey Mare and her Colts, is 1 1/4 miles (2 km) to the west.
