= John Russell (knight) =

English knight (13th century)

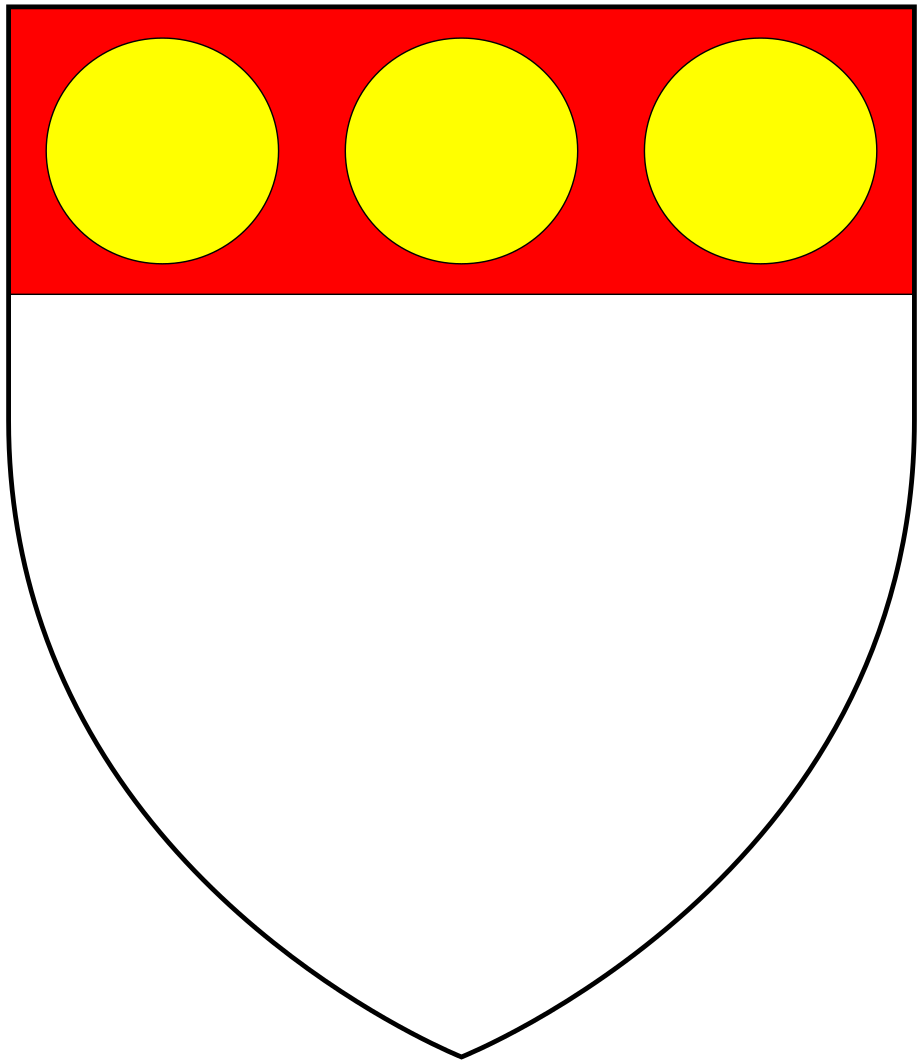
Arms of Russell of Kingston Russell & Dyrham: Argent, on a chief gules three bezants. These arms were adopted by John Russell c. 1215 at the start of the age of heraldry

Sir John Russell (died c. 1224) of Kingston Russell in Dorset, England, was a household knight of King John (1199–1216), and of the young King Henry III (1216–1272), to whom he also acted as steward. He served in this capacity as custodian of the royal castles of Corfe (1221 and 1224) and Sherborne (1224) in Dorset and of the castles of Peveril and Bolsover in Derbyshire. He served as Sheriff of Somerset in 1223-1224. He was granted the royal manor of Kingston Russell in Dorset under a feudal land tenure of grand serjeanty. Between 1212 and about 1215 he acquired a moiety of the feudal barony of Newmarch, (shared with John de Bottrel/Bottreaux) the caput of which was at North Cadbury, Somerset, in respect of which he received a summons for the military service of one knight in 1218.

== Debt to Jews ==
Russell had obtained a loan from Aaron the Jew of Lincoln (died 1186), the greatest of the Jewish financiers licensed to trade in England, and on the seizure of Jewish assets by King Henry II (1154–1189) in 1186 his debt became due to the crown. It appears the Treasury was content for a while to leave these debts uncollected, but the position changed following King John's peace treaty with King Philip II of France (1180–1223) signed in May 1200, which required the English king to pay Philip the sum of 20,000 marks. Thereupon John levied a carucage tax on the kingdom and adopted a more active policy towards collection of Aaron's debts, then dealt with on account of their magnitude by a separate specially formed Exchequer of the Jews. In 1200 John Russell rendered his account for his debt to Aaron of £12 14s 8d and paid into the Exchequer on account the sum of 20s (i.e., £1). For the balance he was given respite by royal writ until 1207/8 when he rendered his account for £5 12s 8d and paid 6 marks into the Treasury. He obtained the king's writ for quittance of the remainder.

== Marriage ==
At some time before 1201 he married Rohesia (or Rose) Bardolf, widow of Henry II de la Pomeroy, feudal baron of Berry Pomeroy in Devon and sister of Doun Bardolf (1177–1205), lord of a moiety of the feudal barony of Shelford, Nottinghamshire, inherited from his mother Rose de Hanselin, who had married Thomas Bardolf (died between 1188 and 1194). The de la Pomeroy family came from La Pommeraye, Calvados, near Falaise, Normandy. The English barony of Berry Pomeroy was a large one, its 1166 Cartae Baronum return having reported 32 knight's fees. As the widow of a tenant-in-chief, Rohesia's marriage became the property of the crown to dispose of, and in 1201/2 John Russell agreed to pay 50 marks to the royal treasury for the hand of his bride. He paid the sum over a period of time, having made a payment on account of 8 ½ marks in 1207/8, which still left a balance of 5 marks due. Rohesia brought to Russell as well as her person a life interest in her dower lands, which would have comprised by custom 1/3rd of the lands of her former husband. The division of the latter's lands gave rise to a dispute with Rohesia's son Henry de la Pomeroy jnr., and the matter came before the royal court in 1200, a year before the formal obtaining of the marriage licence, when Russell and Rohesia, already termed his wife, sued Henry regarding certain lands in Devon and Cornwall. The resulting agreement was that Russell and Rose should retain Ayscombe and Stockleigh Pomeroy whilst Henry should have Upottery There arose later a dispute with the Abbot of St Mary du Val in Bayeux who claimed that the advowson of Stockleigh had been given to his abbey amongst the gifts by charter of Josceline (Goslin) de Pomeroy (died post 1123) and Henry I (died 1165) his son, Constable of Normandy which gifts had been confirmed by a charter of Bartholomew, Bishop of Exeter (1161–1184) and later by Henry III (died 1222), Rose's son. Russell claimed in their defence that his wife had confirmed her own title to the Advowson because she herself had exercised her right of presenting a new priest, which appointment had been accepted. The outcome of the dispute is not recorded.

The following two charters of the Augustinian Abbey of St Mary du Val, Bayeux, were published in 1899 by J. Horace Round in his Calendar of Documents Preserved in France: 918-1206

(No.1455) Charter of Goslin de Pomeria, giving, with consent of Emma his wife, and Henry, Roger, Philip, Goslin, and Ralph his sons, by the hand of Richard (1107–1133) Bishop of Bayeux, to the church of St. Mary du Val (que dicitur “Valle”) to the canons there serving God, according to the rule of St. Augustine, in cloistered community, with all that follows: 60 acres in the parish of St. Omer, etc. … and half his swine and those of his heirs, when killed (occisionem porcorum) in Normandy, and the tithe of his mares in Normandy and England and 40 shillings sterling (de Esterlins) from the rents (gablo) of Berry-Pomeroy (Bercium) every year on August 1, and the church and tithe of Berry, etc. and in England (sic) the tithe of his swine and of his mills of Berry etc. … and in England a manor called (Canon) Teign (Tigneam), and his chaplainry in England, namely, the tithe of wool, and cheese, and porkers, and lambs at Ottery (Otrevum), and all belonging to his chaplainry (capellarie ) in England etc. … (Other gifts in Normandy by William son of Payn and Richard his son, a canon of the abbey, by Roger Capra, with consent of his wife Petronilla and son William, etc.) Testibus istis: ("with these witnesses:") Goslino de Pomeria cum filiis suis, Henrico, Rogerio, Philippo, Goslino; et Willelmo filio Pagani, cum filiis suis; et Hugone de Rosello, et Christino de Olleyo; Willelmo filio Ricardi; Waltero de Petra ficta; Willelmo de Rosello; Willelmo de Braio; Goslino de Braio; Roberto Buzone; Roberto de Curcell(is).

Gift by Goslin de Pomeria to St. Mary of the fee of Robert son of Maheld of Tot [14 acres of land]. Gift of William, son of Payn, by consent of his son Richard and permission of his wife, etc. … Anno Dominice incarnationis MoCoXXVo … confirmata est hec carta a Goslino de Pomeria, Emmaque uxore sua etc. … annuente Ricardo de Tornebuto in cujus feodo ecclesia fundata est. (1167)

(No.1456): Charter of Henry (1163–1205) Bishop of Bayeux, notifying that Henry de Pomeria the younger has confirmed in his presence all the gifts of Goslin de Pomeria and Henry his son to St. Mary du Val, in advowsons and other possessions both in Normandy and England. And moreover, so far as lies in his power, he has granted, before him, to St. Mary du Val and the canons there all his right of advowson and presentation, both in Normandy and England, which grant the bishop confirms so far as he is concerned. His testibus: magistro Ranville (sic) cancellario; domino Nicholao priore de Plessecio; Henrico de Somagvillo (sic); Hugone de Herouvilla; Willelmo Bubarel, et pluribus aliis. Hec autem donatio facta est anno ab incarnatione Domini MoCoLXVIIo, sicut charta eis testatur.

It will be remarked that by pure coincidence here is mentioned as one of the witnesses the "Hugo de Rosell" seized upon by Wiffen as the ancestor of John Russell. It was thus perhaps as a result of his investigations into the background of Russell's wife that Wiffen fortuitously fell upon the name of "Rossel". The Hugo in question was probably lord of the Normandy manor of Rosel, 35 kilometres north of La Pommeraye, and was thus within the same social and geographic sphere as the de la Pommeraye family. The Russells of Kingston Russell were never referred to in ancient records with a French particulier "de", which might have connected them with a manor called Rosel etc. somewhere in France, but gained the name more likely from the ruddy (Latin: rossellus) hair or complexion of some distant ancestor.

After Russell's death in 1224 his widow Rohesia obtained royal licence of the king, at the suit of Ralph de Blundeville, Earl of Chester and Lincoln (1172–1232), to marry whomsoever she pleased, so long as he should be a faithful subject of the crown. This was perhaps merely a formality to give her freedom from "troublesome solicitations of the king's courtiers" and no records survive of any subsequent marriage having occurred.

== Awarded Kingston Russell ==
The manor of Kingston in Dorset was held by John Russell in-chief from the king by grand serjeanty. The particular service due to the king was originally to be Marshal of the Buttery (i.e.store of wine barrels), as the entry in the Book of Fees dated 1211 records for the Hundred of "Alvredesberge" (since dissolved), Dorset:

Johannes Russel tenet Kingeston pro dimidia hyda terre de domino rege ex tempore Willelmi Bastard quondam Rege Anglie per serjanciam essendi marescallus buteilerie domini regis ad Natale Domini et ad Pentecosten. ("John Russell holds Kingston for half a hide of land from the Lord King from the time of William the Bastard sometime King of England through the serjeanty of being marshall of the king's buttery at Christmas and at Pentecost")

It is not recorded when the Russells obtained Kingston, yet the lack of any sure record of the family before the time of John Russell suggests he was the first to come to prominence and the first to hold it, probably as a reward from King John.

== Acquires Little Bedwyn ==
In 1211 Russell acquired the manor of Little Bedwyn, newly subinfeudated from the royal manor of Bedwyn, Wiltshire, which had been held by the crown from the 8th century. Russell held it by the feudal land tenure of grand serjeanty of providing two bushels of wine for the king.

== Advowson of Puleham Church ==
In 1213 a certain "John Russell" was awarded by King John what Wiffen termed "the advowson" of Puleham Church in Dorset. This had belonged to Cirencester Abbey from whom it had lapsed to the crown demesne. J. Horace Round was dubious as to whether this John Russell was the same person as the king's knight, and ascertained that the record in fact quite obviously related to a clerical appointment, not an advowson which it was usual for lay persons to hold. Here was another example, concluded Horace Round, of Wiffen's deliberate fabrication of a long pedigree for the family of Russell.

== Awarded wardship of co-heiress of Barony of Newmarch ==
James de Newmarch, feudal baron of North Cadbury died in 1216 leaving two daughters as his co-heiresses. The wardship of Isabel the eldest was granted to John Russell by King John. This was a very valuable grant as the barony comprised several manors, amounting to some 17 fees, and it is unclear whether it was a grant by way of royal reward to Russell or whether he purchased it. The land tax assessment of 1200 shows that he possessed some wealth prior to this grant, yet possibly not of sufficient amount to make the purchase of the wardship of a moiety of a barony comprising several manors. The marriage of the younger daughter Hawise was awarded to John de Boterell, and the two new holders of the barony split it into moieties, dividing the constituent manors between themselves. De Boterell died in 1230 without having produced any issue and was replaced as the husband of Hawise by Nicholas de Moels, whose descendants held his moiety until the 16th century. Russell married off, as was his right, his ward Isabel to his eldest son Ralph Russell (died c. 1250), who thus became a feudal baron. However, before Ralph was of sufficient age to appear himself for the military service demanded from the barony, John Russell as his father was summoned in his place.

== Summoned for military service ==
Due to his holding of a moiety of the barony of Newmarch, Russell became liable to provide one knight to the royal army for a fixed number of days per annum. Even before this grant it appears Russell held other lands by military tenure as in a Chancery document he is recorded as proffering knight service in 1213-14, but the size of his contingent is not legible. He received such a summons in 1218, as one of seven others in Somerset and Devon, one of 115 England-wide, to attend the royal army at Stamford on St John the Baptist's Day (15 July) in the third week of Henry III (1218). The army was to be used for the siege of Newark Castle, which was held against the king by Robert de Gaugy, a Flemish lieutenant of Philip Marc. The scutage roll states: Johannes Russel mittat unum militem pro terra qui fuit Jacobi de Novomercato (John Russell sent one knight in respect of the land which was of James de Newmarch (Latinised to "New-Market")). Below this entry is the record of a summons to John de Bottrel, who held the other moiety of the barony of North Cadbury: Johannes de Botereauls veniat pro eadem terra (John de Bottrel came in respect of the same land).

== Appointed steward of Henry III ==
The following royal order to the Sheriff of London is recorded: "To give John Russell our steward, for the king's use, 300 lbs of wax, a hanaper of almonds and 2 frails of figs"

== Appointed King's Knight of Henry III ==
At Christmas 1217 Henry III gave robes to his military knights, which then numbered just 7, greatly reduced due to his lack of finance from the number in excess of 50 retained by his father King John. The supposition that John Russell was probably one of them is confirmed by the similar order of the next year 1218 by King Henry III to his chamberlain, recorded in the Close Rolls, commands to be given to 5 of the king's knights, including John Russell, "5 robes of green or burnet, namely a tunic and mantle with supertunics of fine linen"

== Recovers Princess Joan ==
Hugh X de Lusignan (died 1249), a magnate of Poitou then nominally but tenuously ruled by King John as the inheritance from his mother Eleanor of Aquitaine, had been betrothed to John's daughter Princess Joan (1210–1238), by his second wife Isabella of Angouleme. The reasons for this betrothal were twofold. Firstly, to create a dynastic alliance to persuade Hugh to use his great influence in Poitou to the benefit of the English crown. The other reason is more complex: in 1200 King John had stolen away for his own second wife the great heiress Isabella of Angouleme (1188–1246), betrothed shortly before in the same year to Hugh's father Hugh IX de Lusignan. Isabelle was one of the greatest beauties of her age, and John appears to have formed a strong attachment to her person, although then aged only 12, as well as to her inheritance. To assuage the anger of Hugh IX it was agreed that his son Hugh X should marry a daughter resulting from the marriage of John and Isabelle. This daughter was Princess Joan, born in 1210, who as an infant was duly betrothed to Hugh X, at least 15 years her senior. The infant Joan was sent to live at the court of Hugh X until she was old enough to enter into matrimony as agreed. Hugh X was also given possession of his betrothed's maritagium (marriage portion) of Saintes, the Saintonge and the Isle of Oleron. However, when she was aged just 6, in 1216, King John her father died, leaving the still young and attractive Isabelle of Angouleme a widow. Hugh X thereupon decided, before 22 May 1216, to the great surprise of the English royal court and without royal licence, to marry Isabella in place of her daughter Joan, which action would have entitled him to a life interest in her dowry as Queen of England, had he obtained the required royal licence to marry a king's widow. King Henry sent him a formal congratulatory letter dated 22 May 1216, which included the request for his sister Joan to be returned to England. Yet in order to obtain his new wife's dowry, Hugh held the Princess Joan as hostage in Poitou and refused to return her to England. Isabella demanded of the regency council of her young son King Henry III the seizin of her dowry lands of Niort in Poitou, Exeter Castle and Rockingham Castle. The position thus appeared at a stalemate. In 1220 Hugh was invited by the king to come to England to attend the great ceremony of the translation of Thomas Becket due to occur in Canterbury Cathedral on 7 July 1220, and was assured that all outstanding issues would then be resolved. Hugh did not accept the invitation, but rather sent to Canterbury his messengers and started to oppress towns in Poitou, in an attempt to persuade Henry to concede to him both Isabella's dower and Joan's maritagium. A letter from Pope Honorius dated 25 September 1220 threatened Hugh with spiritual penalties if he did not surrender both the princess and her maritagium. Since King John had made himself a vassal of the papacy, which gave it the ultimate ownership of his kingdom, the pope had taken a great interest in the preservation of English royal possessions. In an attempt to break the deadlock, the regency council decided on 5 October 1220 to release Isabelle's English dower to Hugh, which included Berkhampstead Castle and probably also Rockingham Castle In compensation for her dower lands in Normandy however, she was granted the Stannaries in Devon and the revenue of Aylesbury for a period of 4 years, with £3,000 paid for arrears in her pension In return for these concessions the following stern royal order dated 6th. October 1220 was issued by Henry to Hugh, nominally his subject as ruler of Poitou, recorded in the Patent Rolls:

”Mandatum est H. de Lezinan quod veniat ad dominum regem in Angliam et adducat secum sororem domini regis et si eam secum ducere non poterit tunc liberet eam in villa Rupelle Johanni Russel, Radulfo Gernun et Godefrido de Craucumb, vel duobus ex illis, si ipsi tres simulm esse non possunt. Teste ut supra”. (It is commanded of Hugh de Lusignan that he should come to the Lord King in England and that he should bring with him the sister of the Lord King and if he is unable to bring her with him then he should release her in the town of La Rochelle to John Russell, Ralph Gernun and Godfrey de Craucumb, or to two of those if the same three are not present at the same time. Witnessed as above (i.e. in the previous royal order of that day)).

These three persons were household knights of Henry III. They were received cordially by Hugh, who delivered Joan into their custody, whilst excusing himself on account of illness from coming in person to England. However, the cordial reception was a ruse to lull the 3 household Knights into a false sense of security. Sir John Russell, Sir Rolf (Rollo) Gernun, and Sir Godfrey de Craucumb were ambushed after La Rochelle. However reports indicate that all three Knights slayed their French attackers and safely transported the Princess Joan home on account of Sir Godfrey speaking fluent French. These events led to a border war between France and England as well as the excommunication of Hugh de Lusignan. The agreement excluded the delivery of Isabella's dower in Niort by Henry and the surrender by Hugh of Joan's maritagium of Oleron, which provided seeds of future conflict.

== Commissioner for marriage of King Alexander ==
The main reason why Henry III wished to recover the custody of his sister Joan from Poitou was that he had promised her in marriage to King Alexander II of Scotland. As part of a peace treaty signed by the two kings at York on 15 June 1220, Henry committed himself to give Joan in marriage to Alexander "if we are able to recover her", and if not he promised Alexander his second sister Isabelle. He promised furthermore to find husbands from the English nobility for Alexander's own sisters Margaret and Isabelle, all matches to be effected within a tightly defined time scale. The agreement was signed by several of King Henry's entourage, including John Russell, who promised that they would ensure the agreement was put into effect. The text is as follows:

De rege Scocie. Rex archiepiscopis, episcopis, abbatibus, comitibus, baronibus, militibus et libere tenentibus, et omnibus fidelibus suis ad quos presens scriptum pervenerit, salutem. Ad universitatis vestre volumus noticiam pervenire quod nos dabimus dilecto et fideli nostro A. illustri regi Scottorum Johannam primogenitam sororem nostram in uxorem ad festum Sancti Michaelis, ab anno Incarnatione Domini M ducentesimo vicesimo, si eam habere poterimus, et nos et consilium nostrum fideliter laborabimus ad eam habendam. Et si forte eam habere non poterimus dabimus ei in uxorem Ysabellam juniorem sororem nostram, imfra quindecim dies proximos sequentes post predictum terminum. Maritabimus etiam Margaretam et Ysabellam sorores ipsius A. regisScottorum a festo Sancti Dionisii anno ab Incarnatione Domini M ducentesimo XX in unum annum in terra nostra ad honorem nostrum et ipsius regis Scottorum vel si eas non maritaverimus infra predictum terminum reddemus eas dicto A. regi Scottorum salvo et libere in terram suam infra mensem proximum post terminum predictum. Dominus W. autem Eboracensis archiepiscopus, P. Wintoniensis, R. Dunolmensis et cancellarius noster, H. Carleolensis, episcopi, et S. abbas Reding, promiserunt in verbo veritatis quod bona fide laborabunt quod omnia predicta compleantur et quod compellent contradictores singuli, scilicet, in parochiis suis per censuram ecclesiasticam quod predicta observentur et super hoc cartas suas dederunt eidem A. regi Scottorum. H. etiam de Burgo, justicarius noster Anglie, W. comes Warennie, W. comes Albemarle, Robertus de Ros, Falkesius de Breaute, Willelmus de Cantilupo, Willelmus de Lancastria, Galfridus de Nevill, Radulfus de Trublevill, Robertus de Vallibus, Philippus de Albiniaco, Hugo de Bolebec, Rogerus Bertram, Osbertus Giffard, Johannes Russel juraverunt se observaturos bona fide hoc idem quod archiepiscopus et episcopi promiserunt in verbo veritatis, et inde similiter dicto A. regi Scottorum, cartas suas fecerunt. Et nos ad majorem rei huius securitatem hanc cartam eidem A. regi Scottorum fieri fecimus sigillo nostro sigillatam. Acta apud Eboracum in presencia domini Pandulfi Norwicensis electi, domini pape camerarii et apostolice sedis legati, XV die Junii anno regni nostro quarto.

Translation:

“Concerning the King of Scotland: The King to his archbishops, bishops, abbots, earls, barons, soldiers and freeholders and to all his faithful men to whom the present writing may come, greetings. To all and sundry we wish notice to reach that we have given to our beloved and faithful (cousin) the illustrious Alexander King of the Scots Joan our first-born sister in marriage for the feast of Saint Michael in the one thousandth two hundredth and twentieth year from the Incarnation of Our Lord, if we are able to recover her, and we and our council will labour faithfully towards obtaining her. And if by chance we are not able to obtain her we will give to him as wife Isabelle our younger sister within the next fifteen days following the foresaid date. Moreover we will marry Margaret and Isabelle the sisters of the King of the Scots himself, within one year from the feast of Saint Dionysius in the year from the Incarnation of Our Lord 1220, within our kingdom to the honour of ourself and the King of Scotland himself, evenso if we do not marry them within the foresaid time, we will return them to the said King of the Scots safe and free into his kingdom within the month following the said date. Moreover Lord W. Archbishop of Canterbury, P. of Winton, R. of Durham and our chancellor, H. of Carleon, bishops, and S. abbot of Reading, have promised in a word of truth that they will strive in good faith that all the foresaid things shall come to pass and that they will severally compell those obstructing, that is to say in their own parishes through ecclesiastical censure, that the foregoing should be enacted, and on this (promise) they have given their charters to the same Alexander King of the Scots. Moreover, Hubert de Burgh, our justiciar in England, William de Warenne, William Earl of Albemarle, Robert de Ros, Falkes de Breauté, William I de Cantilupe, William II de Lancaster, Geoffrey de Nevill, Ralph de Trublevill, Robert de Vaux, Osbert Giffard, John Russell have sworn themselves to enforce in good faith this same matter which the archbishop and bishops have promised in a word of truth, and thereupon similarly they have given their charters to the said King of Scots. Ane we for the greater security of this matter have caused this charter to be drawn up for the same Alexander King of Scots sealed with our seal. Enacted at York in the opresence of the Lord Pandulf Bishop of Norwich Bishop elect of Norwich legate of the chamber of the Lord Pope and Apostolic See, the 15th day of June in the fourth year of our reign”.

== Custodian of Corfe and Sherborne Castles ==
In 1224 John Russell was appointed custodian of Corfe Castle and of Sherborne Castle together with the forests and sheriffdom of Somerset and Dorset, in place of Peter de Mauley, who had rebelled against the king's order to surrender them at the king's pleasure. The town of Corsham in Wiltshire and its revenues were granted to him to support him in these duties. He retained these offices until his death later in the same year of 1224.

== Sources ==
- Wiffen, J. H., Historical Memoirs of the House of Russell from the Time of the Norman Conquest, (2 Vols.) Vol.1, London, 1833.
- Carpenter, David. The Minority of Henry III.
- Sanders, I.J. English Baronies; A Study of Their Origin and Descent 1086-1327. Oxford, 1960
- Sanders, I.J. Feudal Military Service in England; A Study of the Constitutional and Military Powers of the Barones in Medieval England. Oxford, 1956
- Gorges, Raymond. The Story of a Family Through Eleven Centuries Illustrated by Portraits and Pedigrees; Being a History of the Family of Gorges. Boston, USA, 1944
- Church, S.D. The Household Knights of King John, Cambridge University Press, 1999
