= Kingston Russell Stone Circle =

Stone circle in Dorset, England

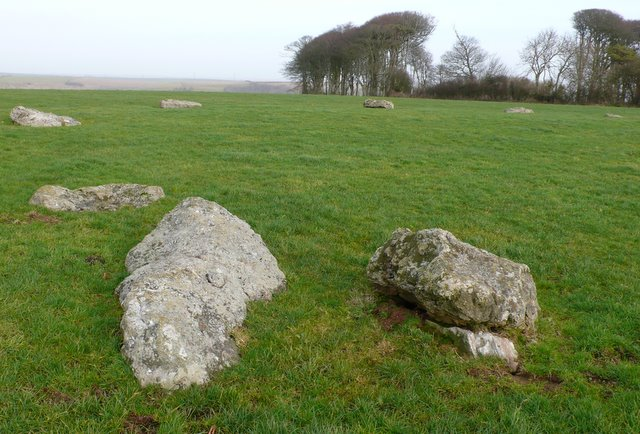
- View across the western half of the circle

- Location within Dorset
- 50°41′19″N 2°35′56″W
- Type: Stone circle
- Periods: Neolithic / Bronze Age
- Location: Kingston Russell

Site notes
- Owner: English Heritage
- Public access: Open any reasonable time during daylight hours.
- Website: https://www.english-heritage.org.uk/visit/places/kingston-russell-stone-circle/

Scheduled monument
- Official name: The Kingston Russell stone circle 750m north east of Gorwell Farm
- Designated: 6 August 1916
- Reference no.: 1011987

Kingston Russell Stone Circle, also known as the Gorwell Circle, is a stone circle located between the villages of Abbotsbury and Littlebredy in the south-western English county of Dorset. Archaeologists believe that it was likely erected during the Bronze Age. The Kingston Russell ring is part of a tradition of stone circle construction that spread throughout much of Britain, Ireland, and Brittany during the Late Neolithic and Early Bronze Age, over a period between 3,300 and 900 BCE. The purpose of such monuments is unknown, although archaeologists speculate that they were likely religious sites, with the stones perhaps having supernatural associations for those who built the circles.

A number of these circles were built in the area around modern Dorset, typically being constructed from sarsen stone and being smaller than those found elsewhere. The Kingston Russell ring is the largest of those in Dorset, measuring 24 by 27 metres (79 feet by 89 feet) in diameter and containing eighteen sarsen stones arranged in an oval shape. The site has not been excavated or been subject to in-depth archaeological investigation.

== Location ==
Positioned at the national grid reference 35770878, Kingston Russell Stone Circle is located on a chalk ridge that is west of Portesham, overlooking Abbotsbury and the sea. The site is located on open downland at a height of 189 metres (620 feet) above sea level. The historic house of Kingston Russell is about 1.6 kilometres to the north. The ruined burial chamber known as The Grey Mare and her Colts is a short distance to the southeast.

The site is also known as the Gorwell Circle, a name adopted from Gorwell Farm to the south. It can be approached via a footpath from near to Gorwell Farm. It is most visible when the grass around it is cut short, for the stones are obscured when the grass grows longer. The site is a scheduled monument, and thus accorded legal protection under the Ancient Monuments and Archaeological Areas Act 1979.

== Context ==
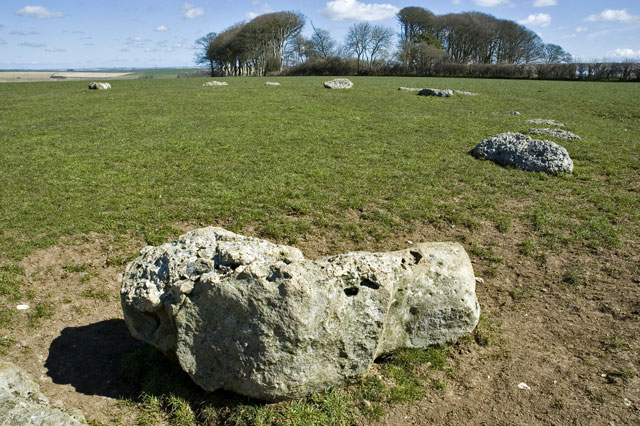
The circle

While the transition from the Early Neolithic to the Late Neolithic—which took place with the transition from the fourth to the third millennium BCE—witnessed much economic and technological continuity, it also saw a considerable change in the style of monuments erected, particularly in southern and eastern England. By 3000 BCE, the long barrows, causewayed enclosures, and cursuses which had predominated in the Early Neolithic had ceased being built, and were instead replaced by circular monuments of various kinds. These include earthen henges, timber circles, and stone circles. These latter circles are found in most areas of Britain where stone is available, with the exception of the island's south-eastern corner. They are most densely concentrated in south-western Britain and on the north-eastern horn of Scotland, near Aberdeen. The tradition of their construction may have lasted for 2,400 years, from 3300 to 900 BCE, with the major phase of building taking place between 3000 and 1,300 BCE.

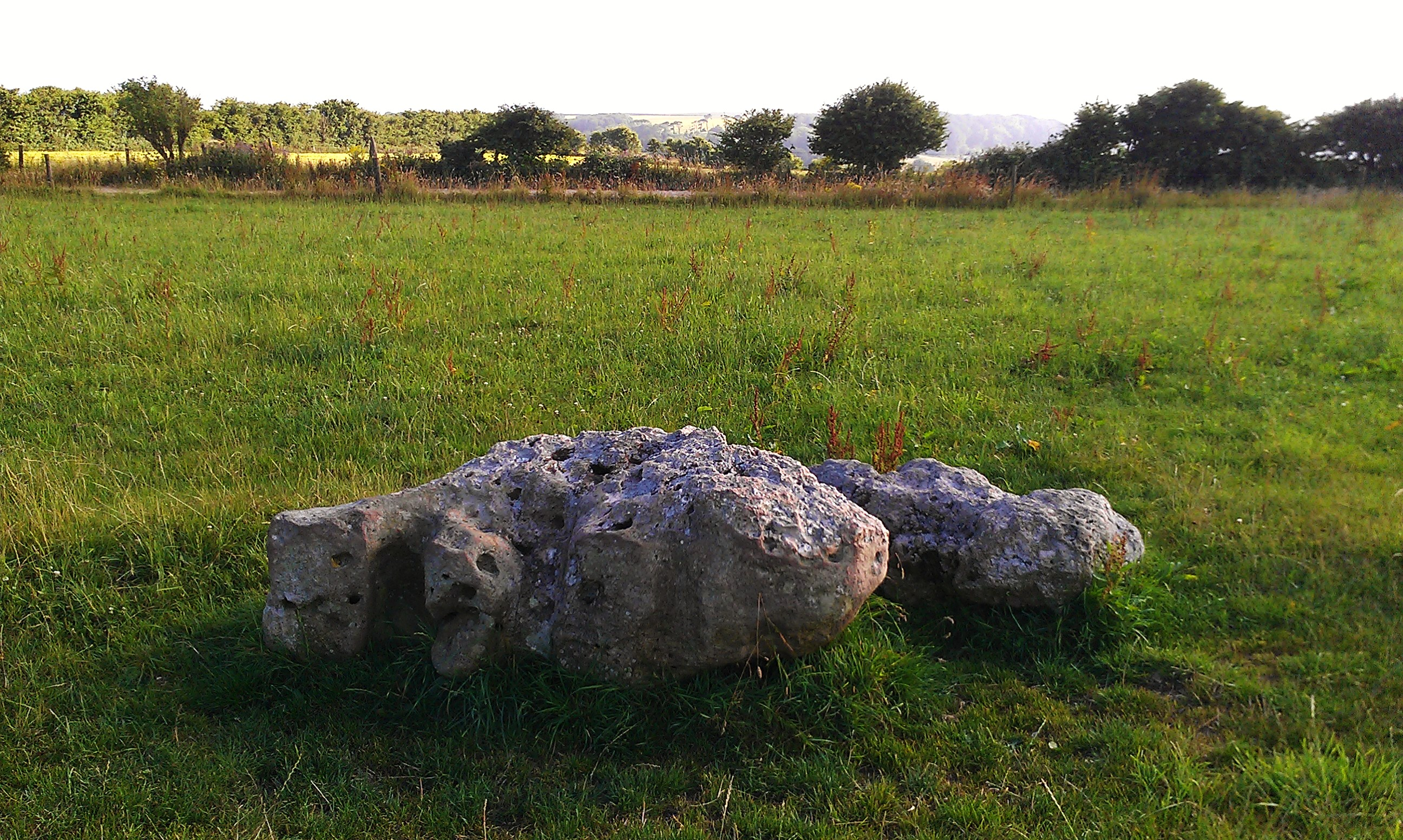
One of the recumbent stones

These stone circles typically show very little evidence of human visitation during the period immediately following their creation. This suggests that they were not sites used for rituals that left archaeologically visible evidence, and may have been deliberately left as "silent and empty monuments". The archaeologist Mike Parker Pearson suggested that in Neolithic Britain, stone was associated with the dead and wood with the living. Other archaeologists have suggested that the stone might not represent ancestors, but rather other supernatural entities, such as deities.

The area of modern Dorset has only a "thin scatter" of stone circles, with nine possible examples known within its boundaries. The archaeologist John Gale described these as "a small but significant group" of such monuments, and all are located within five miles (eight kilometres) of the sea. All but one—Rempstone Stone Circle on the Isle of Purbeck—are located on the chalk hills west of Dorchester. The Dorset circles have a simplistic typology, being of comparatively small size, and that at Kingston Russell is the largest. All are oval in shape, although perhaps have been altered from their original form. With the exception of the Rempstone circle, all consist of sarsen stone. Much of this may have been obtained from the Valley of Stones, a location at the foot of Crow Hill near to Littlebredy, which is located within the vicinity of many of these circles. With the exception of the circle at Litton Cheney, none display evidence of any outlying stones or earthworks around the stone circle.

The archaeologists Stuart and Cecily Piggott believed that the circles of Dorset were probably of Bronze Age origin, a view endorsed by the archaeologist Aubrey Burl, who noted that their distribution did not match that of any known Neolithic sites. It is possible that they were not all constructed around the same date, and the Piggotts suggested that while they may well be Early Bronze Age in date, it is also possible that "their use and possibly their construction may last into the Middle and even into the Late Bronze Age". Their nearest analogies are the circles found on Dartmoor and Exmoor to the west, and the Stanton Drew stone circles to the north. It is also possible that the stone circles were linked to a number of earthen henges erected in Dorset around the same period.

== Description ==
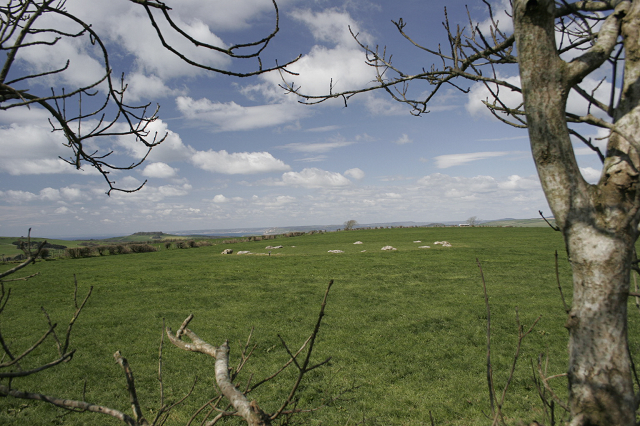
The circle in its landscape context

Kingston Russell is the largest surviving stone circle in Dorset. The stones are arranged in an oval with a diameter measuring from 24 by 27 metres (79 by 89 feet). The ring consists of eighteen stones, the longest of which are located at the north of the circle. As of 1939, all the stones were lying on the ground, although there is a record that in 1815 one stone on the southern side was still standing upright. The Piggotts suggested that while the circle retained its full number of original megaliths, some of them might have been moved from their original positions. It is possible that the ring was graded in height, with the tallest stones being located on the north.

The stones are made of sarsen or conglomerate. Some of the stones are broken, and it is impossible to tell which fragments are bases and which were originally upper parts. The stones vary in size from 2 metres by 0.5 metres (7 feet by 1.6 feet) to 1 metre by 0.3 metres (3 feet by 1 foot). In 1980, it was stated that a stone was "supposed" to have been added to the circle "in recent years".

The antiquarian John Hutchins mentioned the circle in his 1774 work The History and Antiquities of Dorset. Influenced by the ideas of fellow antiquarian William Stukeley, Hutchins described the Kingston Russell ring as a "druidical circle", thereby attributing its creation to the Iron Age druids. As of 2003, the site had not been excavated by archaeologists or extensively studied. The site is on privately owned land although is accessible to the public.

The site was designated a scheduled monument in 1916 and is in the guardianship of English Heritage.
