= Kingston Russell =

Settlement in Dorset, England

Coordinates: 50.720385°N 2.5941201°W

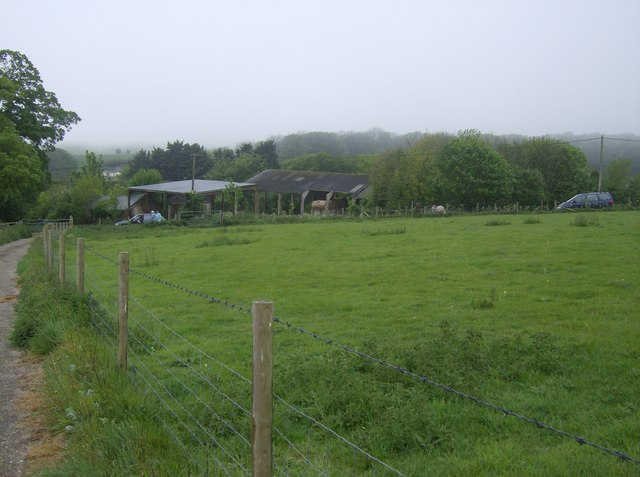

- Location within Dorset
- Area: 4.72 km^{2} (1.82 sq mi)
- Population: 35 (2001 census)
  - Density: 7/km^{2} (18/sq mi)
- Civil parish: Long Bredy and Kingston Russell
- Unitary authority: Dorset
- Ceremonial county: Dorset
- Region: South West
- Country: England
- Sovereign state: United Kingdom
- Police: Dorset
- Fire: Dorset and Wiltshire
- Ambulance: South Western

Kingston Russell is a settlement in the civil parish of Long Bredy and Kingston Russell, in the Dorset district, in the county of Dorset, England, 7 miles (11 km) west of Dorchester. In 2001 the parish had a population of 35. The parish bordered Compton Valence, Littlebredy, Long Bredy and Winterbourne Abbas. Kingston Russell shared a parish council with Long Bredy. On 1 April 2024 the parish was abolished and merged with Long Bredy to form "Long Bredy and Kingston Russell". From 1974 to 2019 it was in West Dorset district.

== Features ==
There are 4 listed buildings in the former parish of Kingston Russell.

== History ==
The name "Kingston" means 'King's stone', it was held by John Russell in 1212.

== See also ==
- Kingston Russell House
- Kingston Russell Stone Circle
