= Moiety title =

Legal term describing a portion other than a whole of ownership of property

In law, a moiety title is the ownership of part of a property. The word derives from Old French moitié, "half" (the word has the same meaning in modern French), from Latin medietas ("middle"), from medius.

In English law, it relates to parsing aspects of ownership and liability in all forms of property.

In the Australian system of land title, it typically applies to maisonettes or attached cottages whereby the owner owns a share of the total land on the title and leases a certain portion of the land back for themselves from the other owner(s). Some finance institutions do not offer loans for properties on moiety titles as security.

== Real estate ==
Moiety is a Middle English word for one of two equal parts under the feudal system. Thus on the death of a feudal baron or lord of the manor without a male heir (the eldest of whom would inherit all his estates by the custom of male primogeniture) but with daughters as heiresses, a moiety of his fiefdom would generally pass to each daughter, to be held by her husband. This would involve the division of the barony, generally consisting of several manors, into two or more groups of manors, which division would presumably be effected by negotiation between the parties concerned. Such was the case in the barony of Newmarch, the caput or chief manor of which was at North Cadbury, Somerset, when James de Newmarch died in 1216; had no son but left two co-heiresses, Isabel and Hawise, who being heirs of a tenant-in-chief became wards of the king.

Certain freehold and copyhold hereditaments and leasehold tenements of Henry Belward Ray were left in his will to infants with whom he – the testator – had no blood relation. To ensure that Ray's land would not escheat to the Crown, in March 1860, his trustees presented a petition to the Lord High Chancellor of Great Britain to create an Act of Parliament which would legally allow Arthur Lupton of Potternewton Lodge undivided moiety, i.e. the rights of a mesne lord of the manor of Potternewton, and not the exclusive ownership of a lord paramount.

== Offices of state ==
Not only landholdings but also the holding of offices of state could devolve by moiety. In the Royal Court of the United Kingdom, one moiety of the ancient office of Lord Great Chamberlain is a hereditary office of the Cholmondeley family. This hereditary office came into the Cholmondeley family through the marriage of the first Marquess of Cholmondeley to Lady Georgiana Charlotte Bertie, daughter of Peregrine Bertie, 3rd Duke of Ancaster and Kesteven. The second, fourth, fifth, sixth, and seventh holders of the marquessate have all held this office.

== See also ==
- English property law
- Party wall
- Mesne lord
