= Avon and Gloucestershire Railway =

Abandoned United Kingdom railway line

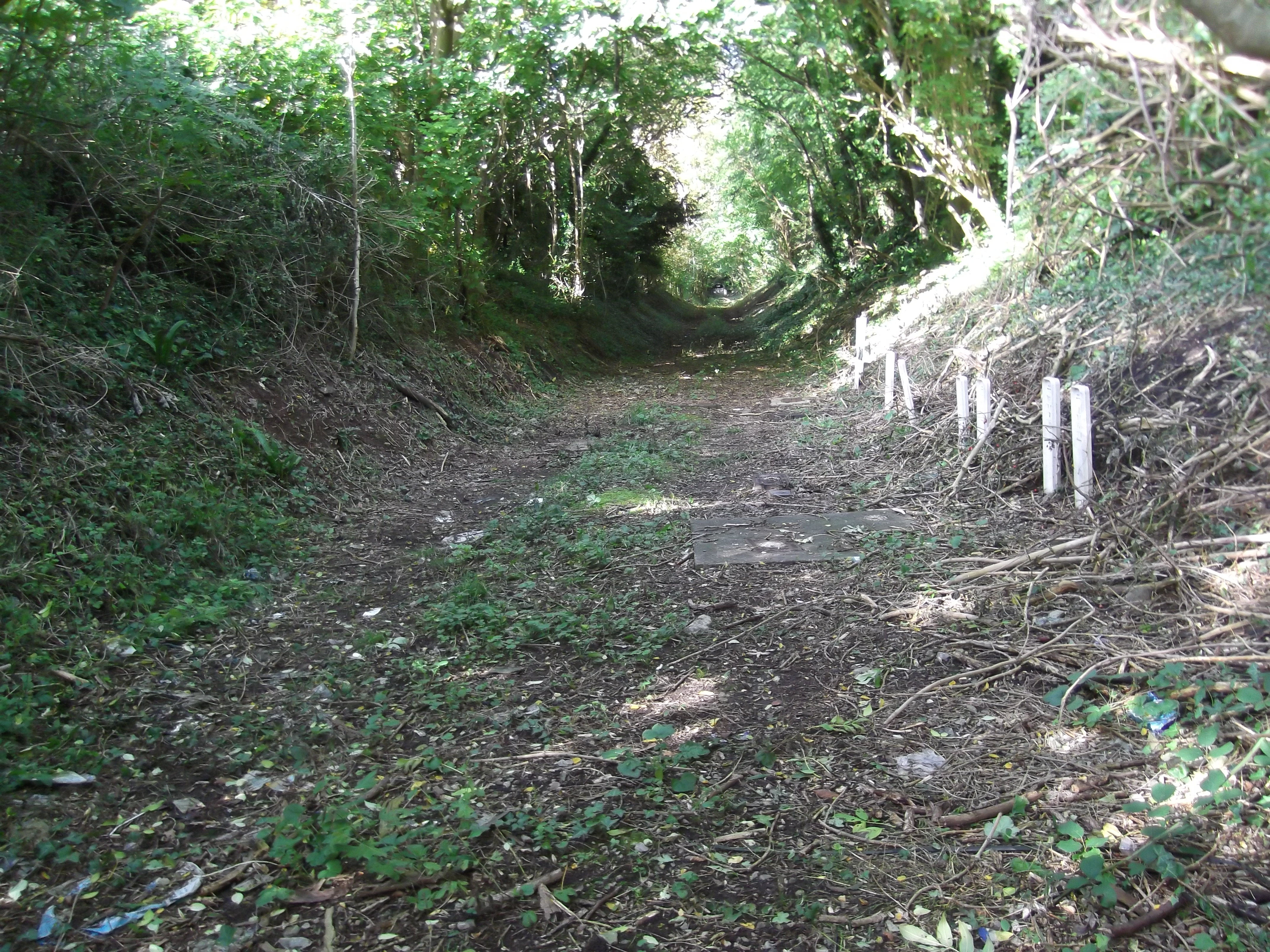
The trackbed near Willsbridge

The Avon and Gloucestershire Railway also known as The Dramway was an early mineral railway, built to bring coal from pits in the Coalpit Heath area, north-east of Bristol, to the River Avon opposite Keynsham. It was dependent on another line for access to the majority of the pits, and after early success, bad relations and falling traffic potential dogged most of its existence.

It was five and a half miles (8.9 km) long, single track, and 4 ft 8 1/2 in (1,435 mm) standard gauge. It opened in part in December 1830 and carried its last traffic in January 1904, having been near-dormant since 1844. It used horses to pull wagons. Part of its route is accessible today as a footpath, and signs of much of the route are still visible.

== Origins ==
In the latter years of the eighteenth century, coal pits were opened up in what became the northern and eastern parts of the Bristol Coalfield and the Somerset Coalfield. Extracting the coal was only part of the process, and bringing it to market was the necessary next step; before proper roads existed, land transport of heavy bulk materials posed huge challenges, although rivers and canals provided a partial solution.

The important industrial city of Bristol generated a massive demand for coal, for domestic and industrial purposes, and the proprietors of pits in the Coalpit Heath area, about nine miles (14 km) north-east of the city, turned their attention to wagonways and tramways as a solution to their transport problem. Numerous schemes were put forward, but none gained the necessary financial support until the Bristol and Gloucestershire Railway (B&GlosR) was formed, in October 1827.

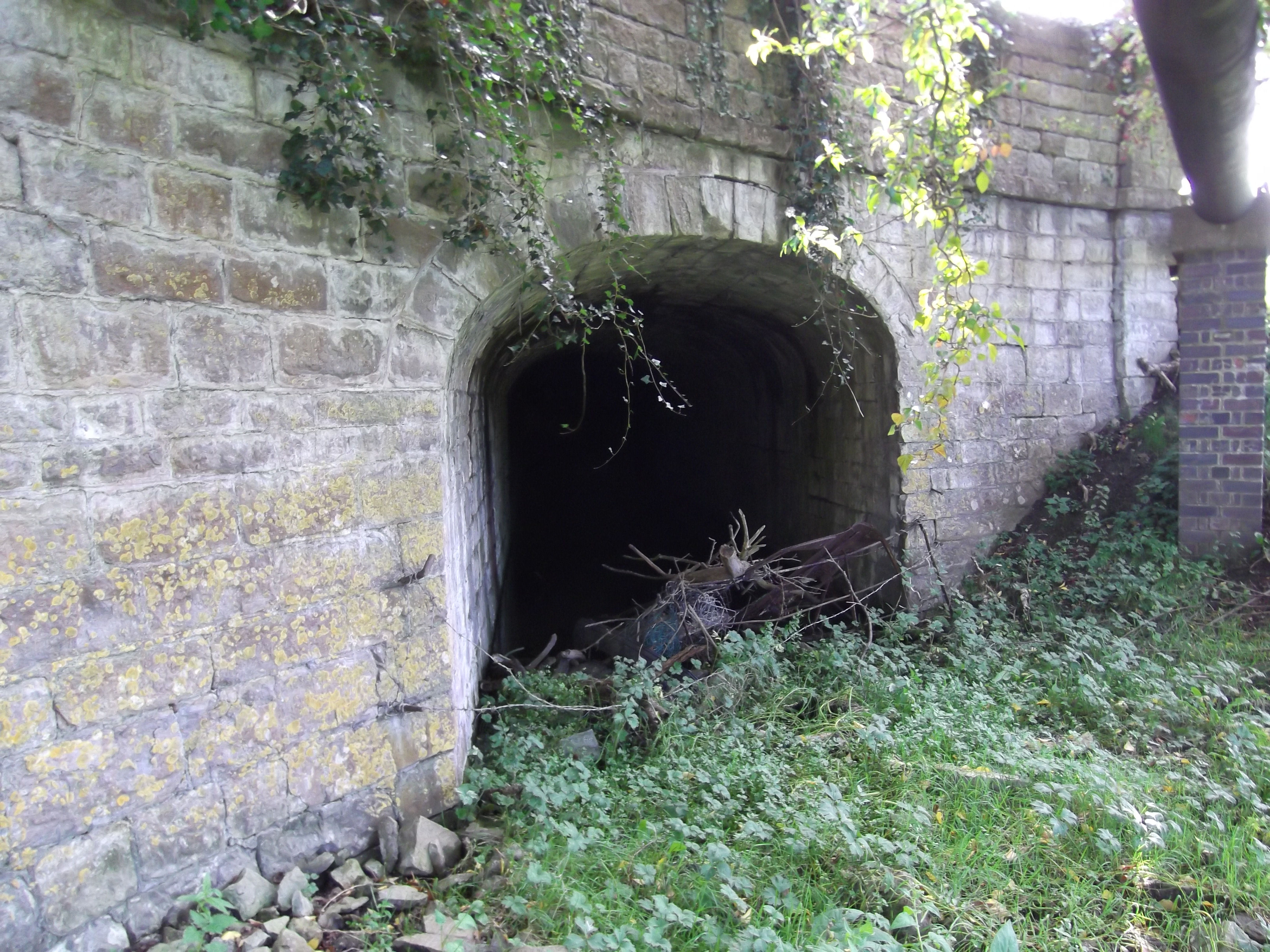
A&GR bridge under the Keynsham to Willsbridge road

It was to be a horse-operated railway, running from pits in the Coalpit Heath area to a wharf on the Floating Harbour in Bristol. During the meetings to determine the support for the proposed railway, the Kennet and Avon Canal company had expressed a desire that here should be a branch to the River Avon, with which the canal connected, near Keynsham, and this was apparently agreed to. This was to enable the canal company to convey coal to Bath and further east to the Wiltshire towns it served.

Avon and Gloucestershire Railway Act 1828
- Act of Parliament
- Parliament of the United Kingdom
- Long title: An Act for making and maintaining a Railway or Tram Road from Rodwall Hill, in the Parish of Mangotsfield in the County of Gloucester, to the River Avon in the Parish of Bitton in the same County.
- Citation: 9 Geo. 4. c. xciv

Dates
- Royal assent: 19 June 1828

Text of statute as originally enacted

At the meeting it was decided that construction of the Keynsham branch of the B&GR line would be handed over to a separate company, the Avon and Gloucestershire Railway (A&GR). The A&GR would have running powers over the section of the B&GlosR to reach the collieries. The Kennet and Avon Canal Company (K&ACC) agreed to subscribe £10,000 towards the project, which was estimated by John Blackwell to cost £20,226 11s 2d. The promoters obtained an act of Parliament, the Avon and Gloucestershire Railway Act 1828 (9 Geo. 4. c. xciv), for their line on 19 June 1828; the parliamentary expenses were paid by the canal company.

As was usual at this date, maximum toll rates were stipulated in the act, as well as wharfage and warehousing; cranage was also specified: 6d for under two tons; 1s 0d for less than three tons; 1s 6d for less than four tons; and so progressively advancing 6d per ton.

The A&GR would run from a junction with the B&GlosR line at Mangotsfield (close to the site of the later Mangotsfield North Junction on the later main line railway) and follow a southerly course to the River Avon. Any coal from Coalpit Heath for the A&GR line would therefore travel over the B&GlosR line as far as the junction.

The majority of the shares in the new company were in the hands of the K&ACC and within a year the canal company bought out all the privately owned shares, so that they owned the A&GR outright. Following this, the K&ACC borrowed £20,000 to help fund the building of the A&GR. They borrowed a further £10,000 in 1831 and another £10,000 in 1832.

Mission creep followed, as several branches were proposed in October 1829, including a three-mile (4.8 km) branch to Wick Limestone Rocks; this was not in fact built. A 43-chain (0.54 mi; 0.87 km) branch to Soundwell Colliery from Siston Common was built, as was a 25-chain (0.31 mi; 0.50 km) branch to Londonderry Wharf on the River Avon; also proposed at this time was a Shortwood Colliery branch from Mangotsfield; this was actually built by the B&GlosR.

The B&GlosR regarded these proposed branches as hostile: the colliery branches invaded territory they regarded as their own. The Londonderry Wharf branch was hugely significant as it lay on the Bristol side of Keynsham lock, on the River Avon: it would enable the A&GR company to transfer coal to river vessels there and take it into Bristol, by-passing most of the B&GlosR line. The A&GR declined to accept that there had been any territorial understanding, but did concede the transfer of the Shortwood branch to the B&GlosR.

== Construction and opening ==
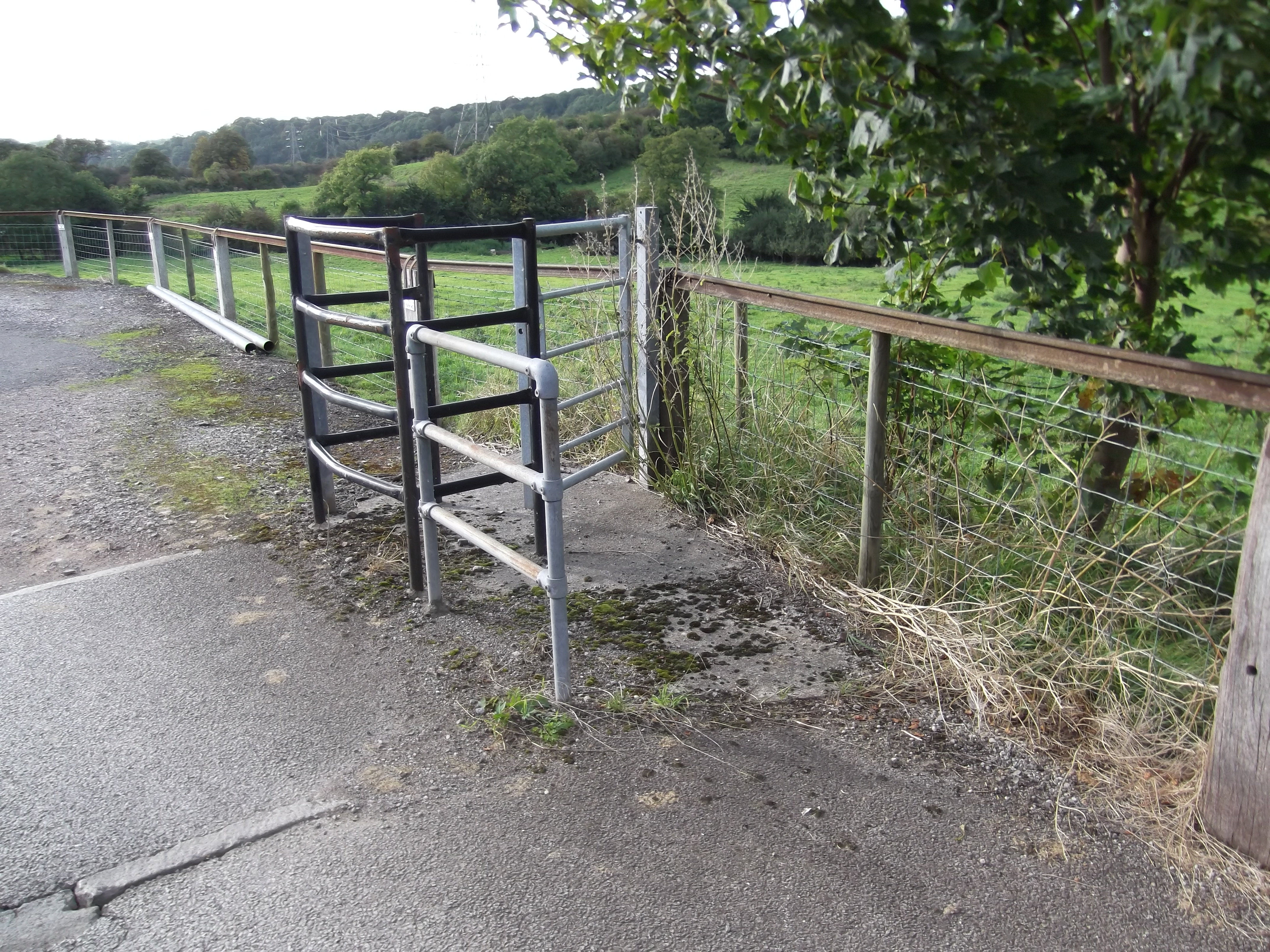
Old rails (but not the earliest pattern) in use as fencing at Londonderry Farm

Avon and Gloucestershire Railway Act 1831
- Act of Parliament
- Parliament of the United Kingdom
- Long title: An Act to alter the Line of the Avon and Gloucester Rail Way, to make certain Branches from the same, and to amend the Act for making the said Rail Way.
- Citation: 1 & 2 Will. 4. c. xii

Dates
- Royal assent: 30 July 1831

Text of statute as originally enacted

Obtaining the necessary land for the line proved difficult, and a further act of Parliament, the Avon and Gloucestershire Railway Act 1831 (1 & 2 Will. 4. c. xii) on 30 July 1831 authorised some deviations, additional capital of £15,000 and yet more branches; these were all short lines to pits close to the A&GR line. Two were actually built: Redfield Lane to Haul Lane (or Hole Lane) pit (6 chains (0.075 mi; 0.12 km)) and Siston Common to Soundwell (43 chains (0.54 mi; 0.87 km)). Two others were authorised but were not built.

At a committee meeting at the Backs Office, Bitton, on 27 October 1830, the committee (Note: Presumably the management committee for the A&GR set up by the Kennet and Avon Canal Company as owners) travelled from there to Haul Lane pit in a "pattern wagon". Presumably this means a standardised design for independent hauliers to adopt, and the journey was probably rail-borne.

It was reported that there were problems with the levels in the Willsbridge Tunnel, requiring it to be deepened, and that two bridges were found to have been constructed improperly, requiring remedial works by the contractor.

The advantages of the railway over horse-and-cart transport were to be considerable, and the pit proprietors were anxious to start using the line; six empty wagons were sent to Haul Lane on 30 December 1830. The Haul Lane coal must have been loaded on the main line, the coal being brought to the railway by horse and cart. (A tramway branch was built to the Pit but this was much later.) The loaded wagons were taken down immediately, so that the lower part of the line can be considered to have carried its first traffic on that day or shortly afterwards. The coal was destined for Bristol, but the Londonderry branch was not ready, so they were taken to the less-convenient Keynsham wharf, but the A&GR charged the rates as if Londonderry was used.

In January 1831 the owner of Soundwell Colliery asked the company to make a branch there, with a financial contribution from him. The committee were unable to take on the additional commitment, but indicated that they would give him every facility to do the work himself, including the use of the company's wagons and route for the actual construction without charge. In fact this seems to have been done by the company, and quickly accomplished; on 17 October 1831 the branch was ready; the cost of laying it was £716 13s 4d, which was repaid to the K&ACC by the colliery owner.

On 16 January 1831 traffic started to be carried from Siston Hill Pit, also being loaded on the main line. It was acknowledged that this was unsatisfactory, and that "turnouts" (sidings or passing loops) were required there and at Haul Lane, with possibly a branch at the latter.

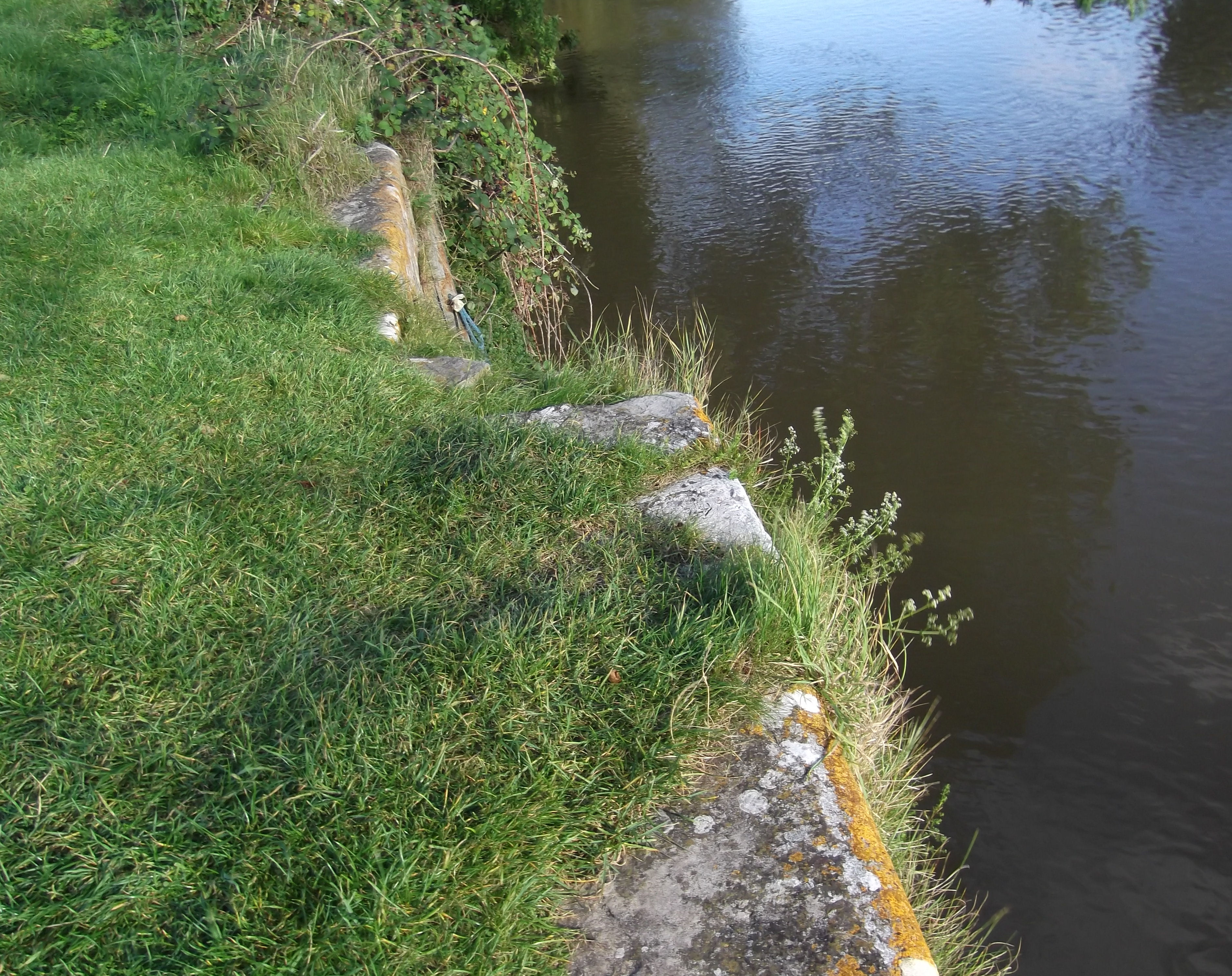
The wharf at Keynsham (2012)

The winter weather made further work difficult, and the B&GlosR line was in difficulty also; however its contractor, Woodward, undertook to complete the northern half of that line (which the A&GR needed, in order to receive the Coalpit Heath coal) by 1 August. The B&GlosR and its contractor were evidently delaying matters, and threats of legal sanctions by the A&GR company were required to force action by them; this resulted in the physical connection at the junction of the two lines at Mangotsfield being made ready on 5 June 1831; but the B&GlosR line onward to the pits at Coalpit Heath was not yet ready.

After further prevarication, the northern section of the B&GlosR was opened by 17 July 1832, although the exact date is unknown, and as the A&GR line had already been made ready this may be regarded as the date of its full opening, except for the Londonderry branch. The cost had been £52,710 6s 11d.

The Londonderry branch was only started in September 1832 and completed by July 1833; the wharf was opened in the first week in October 1833, having cost £1,541 15s 7d.

== In full operation ==
The railway seems to have been operating to full capacity from the beginning, and all the wagons were fully in use. From the opening until May 1835, receipts amounted to: tonnage (i.e. the toll for materials carried): £3,041 15s 3d; hire of wagons: £1,072s 5d; rent: £989 15s 0d. These sums probably exclude the Londonderry branch, which was treated as a separate entity. It was said that the opening of the line resulted in a reduction in the price of coal delivered to the K&ACC of three to four shillings.

The B&GlosR company had opened its line in 1835, and this resulted in considerable abstraction from the A&GR line tonnage carried had reduced to less than half. Suggestions were made of improper favouritism of the B&GlosR line as the destination for coal produced, although the reduction may simply have been the result of a cheaper route to market. The A&GR reduced some tonnage rates, and inevitably their income suffered.

Maggs states that "Most of the money loaned had been paid off ... but it was impossible to pay off the capital expenditure." This appears to mean that the company's bank loans and personal loans had been cleared, but a specific loan from the K&ACC for the construction of the line had not. In June 1843 the K&ACC, as parent company, decided to write off a £45,000 sum due from the A&GR as a bad debt.

== Bristol and Gloucester Railway gauge conversion ==
On 11 July 1839 the first meeting took place of the newly authorised Bristol and Gloucester Railway (B&GR); the new company name must not be confused with the existing Bristol and Gloucestershire Railway (B&GlosR). The Bristol and Gloucester company planned to form part of a chain of railways connecting to Gloucester and the huge manufacturing district of Birmingham. It was authorised to purchase the Bristol and Gloucestershire company, and to build a new line from Westerleigh on that line as far as Standish, about 11 miles (18 km) short of Gloucester. There it would join the Cheltenham and Great Western Union Railway (C&GWUR), then under construction, and trains would run over that company's line to Gloucester. A Birmingham and Gloucester Railway company had been formed and was under construction, completing the chain. However the C&GWUR was a broad gauge railway, and this break of gauge was to be a source of significant complication for all concerned, including the A&GR.

After considerable negotiation, in March 1843, the B&GR decided to build its line as a broad gauge railway; this would simplify the running from Standish to Gloucester, and ensure friendly relations with the powerful Great Western Railway—the GWR was in the process of purchasing the C&GWUR. The Bristol & Gloucester therefore had to convert the former Bristol and Gloucestershire route to the broad gauge.

To carry out the work, the section of that line between Westerleigh and the Mangotsfield Junction with the A&GR was temporarily closed from 5 June 1844, and re-opened as a mixed gauge line—the first in the country—on 29 July 1844. During the closure the Coalpit Heath collieries were unable to send coal to the A&GR. The B&GR's own track was broad gauge with longitudinal timbers under the rails; the narrow gauge track was formed with cross-sleepers and 35 lb/yd (17 kg/m) fishbelly rails; the narrow rails were two inches (51 mm) higher than the broad gauge rails, and at the junctions the broad gauge rails were not interrupted, it being arranged that the narrow gauge vehicles would pass over the broad gauge rails.

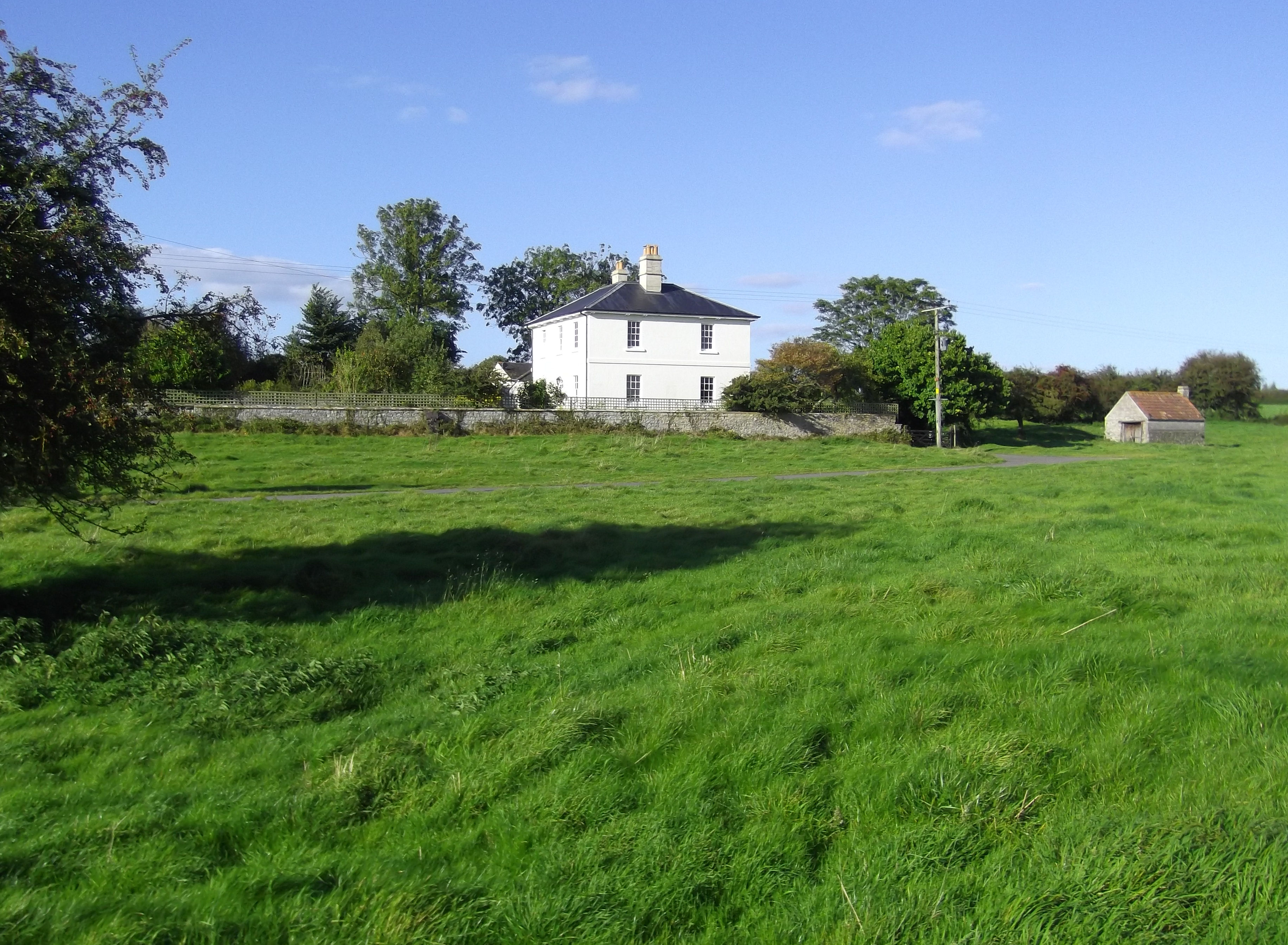
Avon House, the former headquarters building at the Avon Wharf, Keynsham

As the B&GR was going to operate locomotive hauled passenger trains, they indicated that the A&GR trains—still horse drawn—should only start on the common track section immediately following a passenger train. There were to be six a day, and the distance involved was 2.6 miles (4.2 km). The A&GR fiercely resisted this restriction, demanding unrestricted freedom to operate, and Major-General Pasley of Her Majesty's Railway Inspectorate had to arbitrate. He formed the view that the A&GR traffic was very light, amounting to one or two trains every day, and he stated that the proposed limitation was reasonable.

From the Kennet and Avon's point of view, as owners of the A&GR, the matter looked rather different:

There were now difficulties with the Avon & Gloucestershire horse railway, which the canal owned. It had never been a success, and in 1841 £45,000 of capital spent on it had to be written off. Then the Bristol & Gloucester Railway bought the Bristol & Gloucestershire horse railway, with which the A&GR connected, and converted it to the broad gauge and to locomotive operation, the narrow gauge being left in place for the part over which the A&GR ran to Coalpit Heath. It took an hour to pull an A&GR train over this section, and their trains were fitted in with the six steam trains a day of the Bristol & Gloucester. Somewhat naturally the Kennet & Avon complained of the results of this system, and the Board of Trade stopped the working by horses when it came to their ears. Eventually after a discussion the B&GR offered to haul two trains a day of A&GR waggons each way along the joint stretch with their locomotives at 6d a ton including toll, and this offer was accepted.

Later Pasley said that an independent track for the A&GR was desirable, but the A&GR found this unaffordable, and no further traffic ran from the Coalpit Heath pits. An impasse was reached, until on 26 August 1844 the Bristol and Gloucester company wrote to the A&GR proposing a compromise in which they would convert the A&GR line to broad gauge at their own expense, or alternatively haul A&GR trains with their own locomotives over the broad gauge section. The A&GR refused this proposal and in October the B&GR "agreed to lay a second line of narrow gauge rails"—it is not clear whether this meant an independent track alongside the Bristol and Gloucester line.

They did so quite quickly but when Pasley's assistant made an inspection on 27 November 1844, he found that the junctions and turnouts had not been properly formed. It appears that the impasse continued, for it was in November 1849 that a representative of the Coalpit Heath colliery asked why the A&GR line had not been completed as agreed. The A&GR committee replied that they were trying to reach an arrangement with the Midland Railway company (as successors to the B&GR) but this too seems to have been in vain. By this time most of the Coalpit Heath pits had ceased operation and the potential traffic was probably very small.

== The Midland Railway ==
In 1864 the Midland Railway obtained authority in the Midland Railway (Bath and Thornbury Lines) Act 1864 (27 & 28 Vict. c. clxiv) to build a branch line from Mangotsfield to Bath. At first a proposal involved acquiring the alignment of part of the A&GR and using it for the new line, but this was not pursued. The revised route ran close to the alignment of the A&GR as far as Oldand Common. Near Siston Common, the route of the A&GR was altered at the expense of the Midland Railway to avoid the need for the new line to cross the A&GR twice. The A&GR alignment was chosen to avoid earthworks, and the Midland Railway was compelled to provide a cutting to accommodate the old line. Oldland Common tunnel was strengthened in the centre portion where the new line crossed it. Williams describes the extension of the Midland Railway to Bitton and Bath over this tunnel, which had to be lined for 90 feet (27 m) at MR expense to strengthen it. The Midland Railway line opened in 1869. The last entry in the A&GR account book had been in January 1867, so it may be that the new alignment never saw traffic.

== Abandonment ==
On 1 July 1851 the Kennet and Avon Canal company was taken over by the Great Western Railway under the Great Western Railway Act 1852 No. 1 (15 & 16 Vict. c. cxl). (Note: Maggs cites this date but states that this was by transfer deed dated 29 July 1852, over a year later) On 5 July 1865 the GWR obtained the Great Western Railway (Additional Powers) Act 1865 (28 & 29 Vict. c. ccxcix) which permitted (among other things) the abandonment of the A&GR line, and the last entry in the A&GR account book was dated January 1867.

In 1876 California Colliery at Oldland was re-opened and used part of the line, having repaired it at their own expense. In August 1892 this colliery sent 60 tons of coal a day to the Avon, and the last entry in the K&ACC wharfage book was on 30 January 1904. On 9 July 1906 the GWR traffic committee was informed that all traffic on the line had ceased.

== Route ==
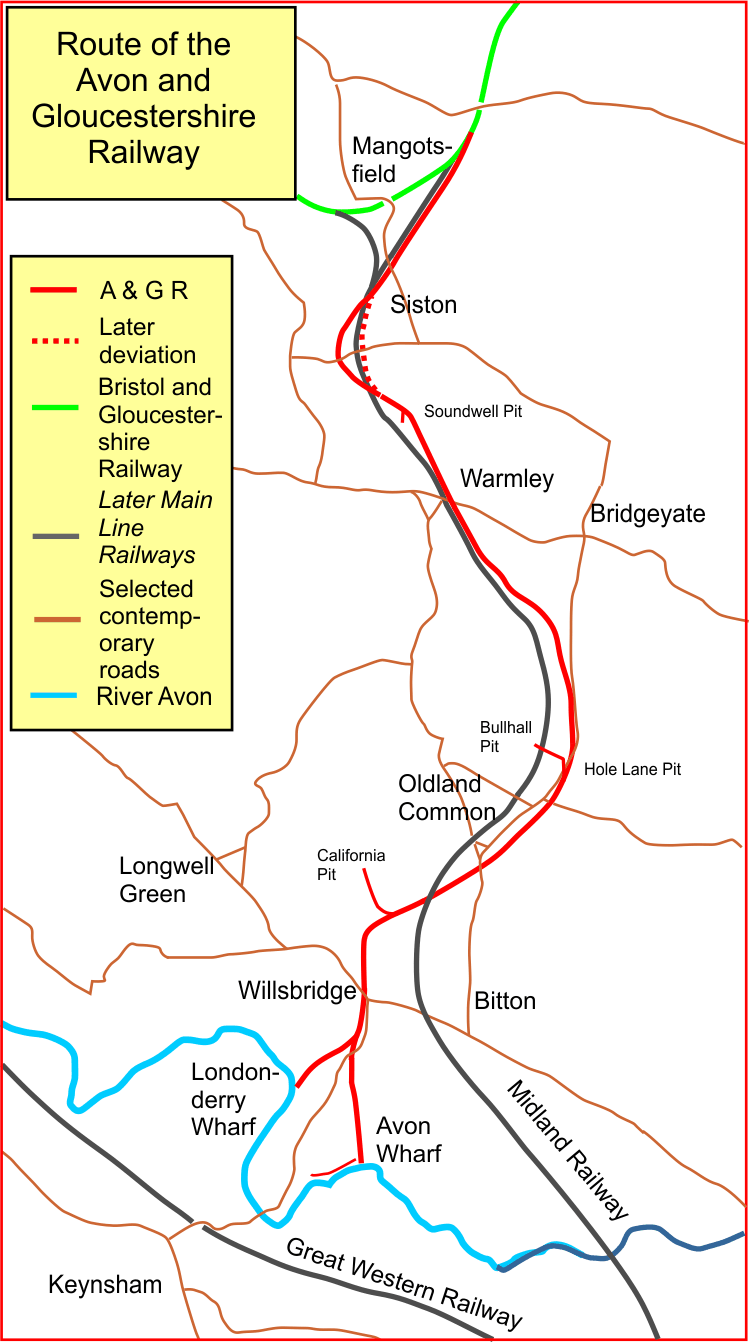
The Avon and Gloucestershire Railway network

The wharf on the river Avon was at a place called the Backs, opposite Keynsham; it was about 15 yards (14 m) long and the line approached at right angles, with a wagon turntable to serve the wharf-side siding. A weigh-house, stables and workshops were located here, as also was Avonside House, the company headquarters, a building now in use as a private residence. A siding 400 yards (370 m) long led westwards to the quarry the company used.

The main line ran northwards, climbing and in a cutting and passing under a farm overbridge near Londonderry Farm, and then through a long bridge under the present-day A4175 (Keynsham to Willsbridge) road. Continuing across the field, the Londonderry branch ascends and joins the main line, which then runs to Willsbridge, where there was a "wharf". The line crossed the turnpike road (the present-day A431 road) on the level immediately to the west of the road junction, entering a cutting and then a tunnel 156 yards (143 m) long; this area is now occupied by a water company. On the north side of the tunnel, the line ran in a deep rock cutting, now accessible as "The Dramway", a local walking route, and the line curved round the western shoulder of the hillside to a point known as Tramway Junction, where the California Colliery branch trailed in.

There followed another rock cutting and then a tunnel under Cherry Garden Lane, and then a longer tunnel, at 73 yards (67 m), after which the line ran under Barry Road and then alongside Oldland Common High Street on its east side. Immediately after passing under Redfield Lane, the Haul Lane Pit branch diverged to the left, crossing the main road. Further north the line crossed to the west side of the main road in a 66-yard (60 m) tunnel, then crossing Victoria Road and then Poplar Road on the level.

Next the line crossed under a lane near Warmley church, with Goldney Pit and Crown Pit adjacent to the line on its east side, respectively south and north of Warmley High Street. After another overbridge the line swings to the west to follow the contour. The Soundwell Pit branch diverges here: Maggs says at the level crossing just north of Willow Tree Farm but a farm of that name does not appear on available Ordnance Survey maps, nor can the route of the branch line be traced. The pit closed in 1853. The branch line was graded against loaded traffic.

The main line swings back to the north-east, under a road near the later Mangotsfield South Junction (of the main line railway) and the Goose Green road, trailing in to join the Bristol and Gloucestershire line at what became Mangotsfield North Junction.

When the Midland Railway was constructing its Bath branch, the A&GR route was re-aligned immediately east of the new line.

The Londonderry branch ran from a wharf on the River Avon just south of the point where Siston Brook (or Wamley Brook) joins the main river. There were three sidings and a weigh-house there. The route to join the main line near Clack's Farm ran in a shallow cutting as it ran north-east.

A description of the whole route, with photographs and a sketch map, based on an inspection in 1932, is given by Baxter.

== Pits on the line ==
Goldney Pit and Crown Pit have already been referred to, adjacent to the line at Warmley High Street.

Haul Lane Pit was located at grid reference ST678718, immediately west of Bath Road; it had a short siding connection, facing to northbound trains, which crossed Bath Road. A branch continued, following the footpath that now leads to Coombes Way, which then served a pit called Bullhall Pit, at ST675719, immediately to the west of the Midland Railway's Bath branch railway line. These pits are shown on the 1882 Ordnance Survey map but are "disused" by 1904, having sent the last load of coal by the railway in 1867. The tramway to Bullhall may have been built and operated by the colliery owners. When the Midland Railway route was built parallel to the A&GR in 1869, a bridge was provided crossing that line to maintain the access.

Crown Colliery was at ST673733, near Warmley station and straddling the main road. The engine house of one of the shafts is (2009) still standing.

California Pit was located at ST665714, immediately south of Dodd Lane, now California Road. A new 640-yard-deep (590 m) shaft was sunk in 1876 by Abraham Fussell on the site of an earlier shaft called Blowbottom, part of the Brook Pits group. He renamed it California to indicate profitable prospects comparable to the California Gold Rush of a quarter century earlier. At first it was not rail-connected, and it became disused, but in 1889 (Note: Bodman gives 1881) it was re-opened and a 450-yard-long (410 m) branch line constructed: it ran generally south-south-east across fields, to a point at Siston Brook (or Warmley Brook) near the present-day Sunnyvale footbridge. It turned north-eastwards down an inclined plane at 1 in 10 to cross the brook and join the A&GR main line. The inclined plane was self-acting, and was 150 yards (140 m) long; the junction was known as Tramway Junction. The colliery was closed down in March 1904, following inundation, and by the time of survey for the 1915 map the tramway is absent.

A large stone bridge taking the tramway over the river survives at the foot of the formation.

Soundwell Colliery was a group of pits, of which the chief were Soundwell Lower Pit at ST657752 and Soundwell Upper Pit, or High Pit, at ST649752. The location is just north of Chiphouse Road, a little west of Station Road. The 46-chain (0.58 mi; 0.93 km) branch is shown on the 1840/50 Ordnance Survey maps, joining the main line near where Fisher Road crosses Siston Brook, at ST664744. The line of the branch to soundwell is still visible as a platform running down the side of the embankment across Siston common and as a shallow indentation in the grass adjacent to the road at the Soundwell end of the embankment. Pictures of this branch are shown in the book by Peter Lawson. The colliery had closed in 1853 following an inundation.

Siston Hill Pit was at ST669739, at the point where Stanley Road joins Siston Hill, immediately west of the main line. It had a short siding, facing for southbound trains.

== Engineering ==
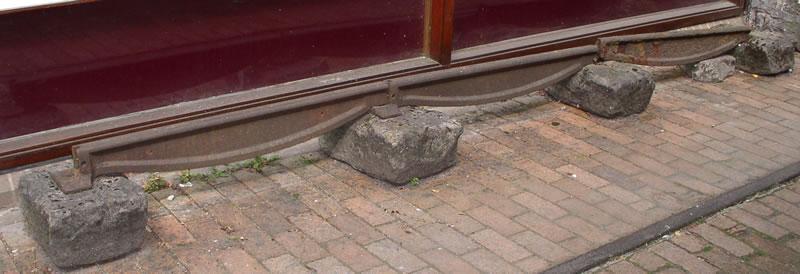
Fishbellied cast iron rail

The original A&GR track was formed with T-section rails of Birkinshaw's patent design; they were fishbellied with five webs to each 15 ft (4.6 m) long rail, which weighed 28–30 lb/yd (14–15 kg/m). The rail head was 2 in (5 cm) across and the rail was 4 in (10 cm) deep. They were malleable cast iron, except on the Soundwell branch where they were wrought iron. The sleepers were limestone blocks 18 in (46 cm) square and 10–12 in (25–30 cm) deep, obtained from a quarry near the Keynsham Wharf, with chairs weighing 8 lb (3.6 kg) each, and an iron pin was used to secure the rails.

On the California Colliery branch, 42 lb/yd (21 kg/m) flat bottom rail was used and some steel rails of 40–50 lb/yd (20–25 kg/m) were later used at Willsbridge Wharf.

The wagons were of the usual colliery chaldron type.

== Subsequent use ==
During the war period 1939-1945 the Willsbridge tunnel was used as an air raid shelter, and subsequently (until at least 1953) to grow mushrooms, and was thus inaccessible.

Part of the main line has been made a public footpath, signposted "The Dramway". This designation has been used by a number of local initiatives, but the word "dramway" does not appear in contemporary archival material; the term usually refers to a plateway, which the A&GR was not, as it used edge rails.

At the point where Carsons Road crosses the route of the railway, the bridge was restored when the A4174 road was constructed adjacent.
