= Aubrey Trotman-Dickenson =

British chemist (1926–2016)

Sir Aubrey Trotman-Dickenson
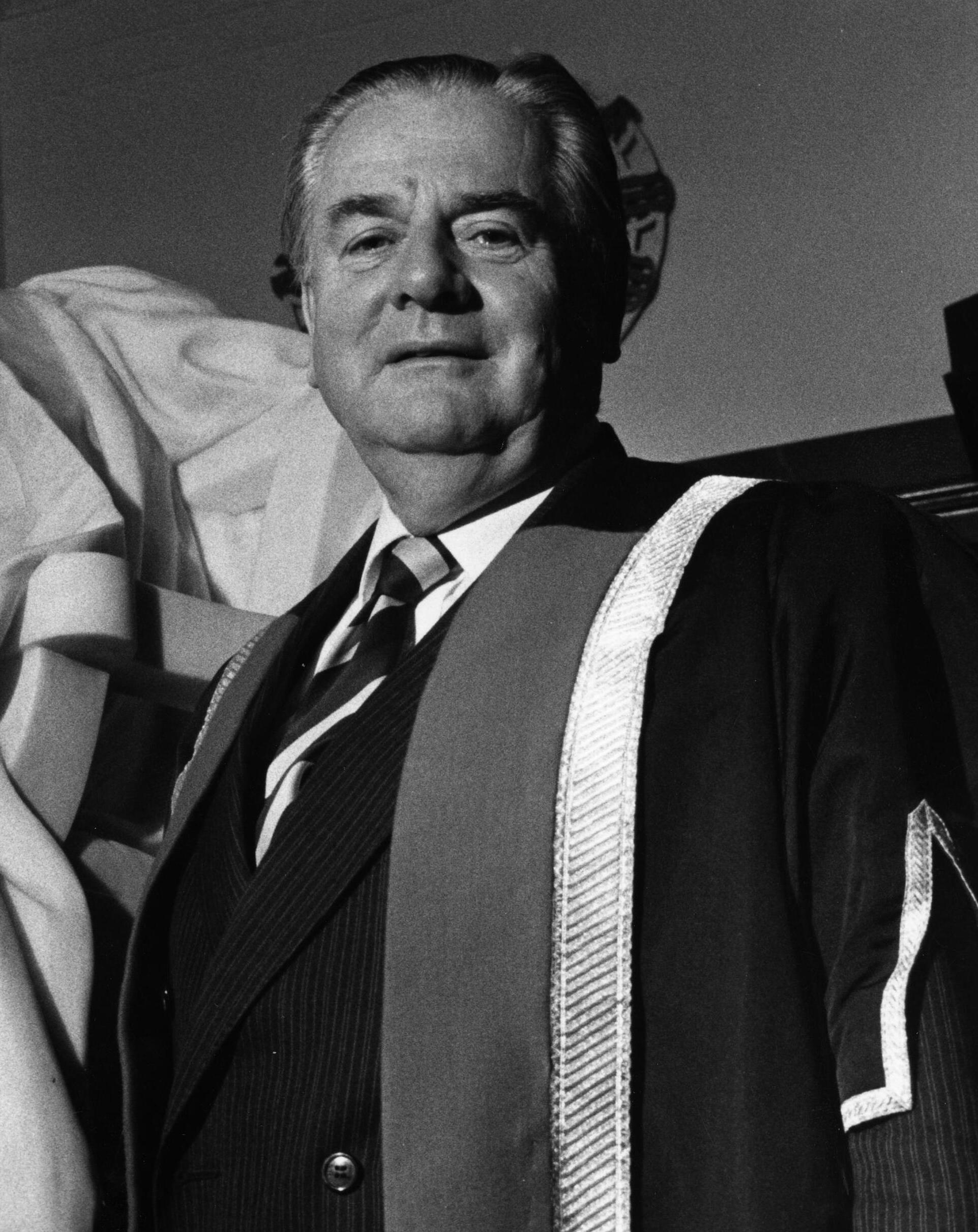
- Professor Trotman-Dickenson in 1988

Vice-Chancellor of University of Wales College of Cardiff
- In office 1988–1993
- Preceded by: Post created
- Succeeded by: Professor Sir Brian Smith

Principal of University of Wales Institute of Science and Technology
- In office 1966–1988
- Preceded by: Dr D. A. Harvey
- Succeeded by: Post abolished

Vice-chancellor of University of Wales
- In office 1975–1977
- Preceded by: C. W. L. Bevan
- Succeeded by: Robert Walter Steel
- In office 1983–1985
- Preceded by: C. W. L. Bevan
- Succeeded by: Gareth Owen
- In office 1991–1993
- Preceded by: Eric Sutherland
- Succeeded by: Kenneth O. Morgan

Personal details
- Born: Aubrey Fiennes Trotman-Dickenson; 12 February 1926 Wilmslow, Cheshire
- Died: 11 November 2016 (aged 90) Siston, Gloucestershire
- Political party: Liberal Democrat (from 2002)
- Other political affiliations: Conservative Party (before 2002)
- Spouse: Danusia, Lady Trotman-Dickenson (m. 1953)
- Children: 3
- Awards: Tilden Prize, Royal Society of Chemistry (1963); Honorary Fellowship, Cardiff University (1987)

Academic background
- Education: Winchester College
- Alma mater: Balliol College, Oxford (BSc, MA); University of Manchester (PhD); University of Edinburgh (DSc)
- Thesis: The kinetics of elementary reactions (1957)

Academic work
- Discipline: Chemistry
- Institutions: National Research Council Canada; Imperial Chemical Industries; University of Manchester; University of Edinburgh; Aberystwyth University
- Main interests: Gas phase kinetics

Sir Aubrey Fiennes Trotman-Dickenson (12 February 1926 – 11 November 2016) was a British chemist and academic administrator.

== Early life and education ==
Trotman-Dickenson was born in Wilmslow, Cheshire on 12 February 1926. His father, Edward Newton Trotman-Dickenson was a cotton merchant and his mother was Violet Murray, née Nicoll. He attended Winchester College and continued to study Chemistry with a scholarship to Balliol College, Oxford in 1944.

== Academic career ==
Having Graduated from Oxford, Trotman-Dickenson moved to Ottawa to work at National Research Council Canada from 1948 to 1950. He then completed an ICI Fellowship at Manchester, where he also earned his PhD in 1952. He worked as a lecturer in chemistry at the University of Edinburgh, where he received a DSc in 1957 for a portfolio of works titled, The kinetics of elementary reactions. He was made Professor and chair of Chemistry at University College of Wales, Aberystwyth by the age of 34. He was appointed Principal of the University of Wales Institute of Science and Technology (UWIST) in 1968 and continued as Principal of its successor, University of Wales College of Cardiff, from 1988 to 1993. He additionally served as the Vice-Chancellor of the University of Wales for three terms: 1975 to 1977, 1983 to 1985, and 1991 to 1993.

== Honours ==
In the 1989 Queen's Birthday Honours, it was announced that Trotman-Dickenson had been appointed a Knight Bachelor and therefore granted the title sir, in recognition of his service as Principal of University of Wales, College of Cardiff. On 5 December 1989, he was knighted by Queen Elizabeth II during a ceremony at Buckingham Palace.

In 1963, Trotman-Dickenson was the Tilden Lecturer for the Chemical Society. In 1995, he was awarded an honorary Doctor of Laws (LLD) degree by the University of Wales.

== Personal life and politics ==
On 11 July 1953 Trotman-Dickenson married economist Donata Irena (Danusia) Hewell and they had three children together.

He was a member of the Conservative Party before eventually joining the Liberal Democrats in 2002. He stood as a Lib Dem candidate in the 2003 South Gloucestershire Council election though he did not succeed in securing a seat.

Trotman-Dickenson died on 11 November 2016, at his home in Siston Court as a result of heart failure. Lady Trotman-Dickenson died on 28 June 2024, at the age of 95.

== Selected works ==
- Trotman-Dickenson, A. F. (1955). Gas kinetics. Butterworth's Scientific Publications. ISBN 978-1114643048.
- Trotman-Dickenson, A. F. (1959). Free radicals: An introduction. New York: Wiley.
- Trotman-Dickenson, A. F.; Milne, G. S. (1967). Tables of Bimolecular Gas Reactions. National Bureau of Standards. Bibcode:1967tbgr.book.....T.
- Bailar, J. C.; Trotman-Dickenson, A. F., eds. (1973). Comprehensive inorganic chemistry. Oxford: Pergamon Press. ISBN 978-0080172750.
