= Siston Brook =

Siston Brook Clack Mill Brook
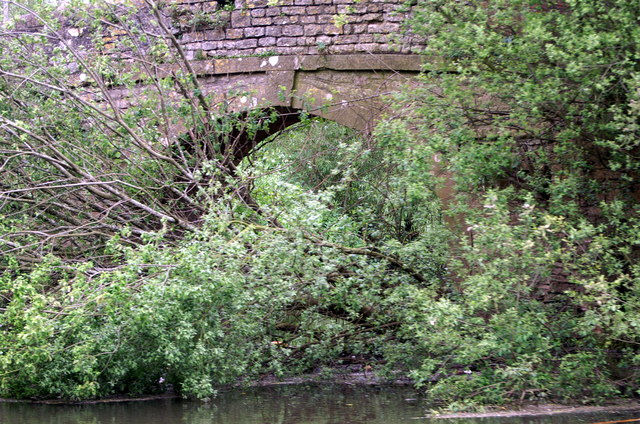
- Londonderry Wharf Bridge crossing the Siston Brook as it joins the Bristol Avon

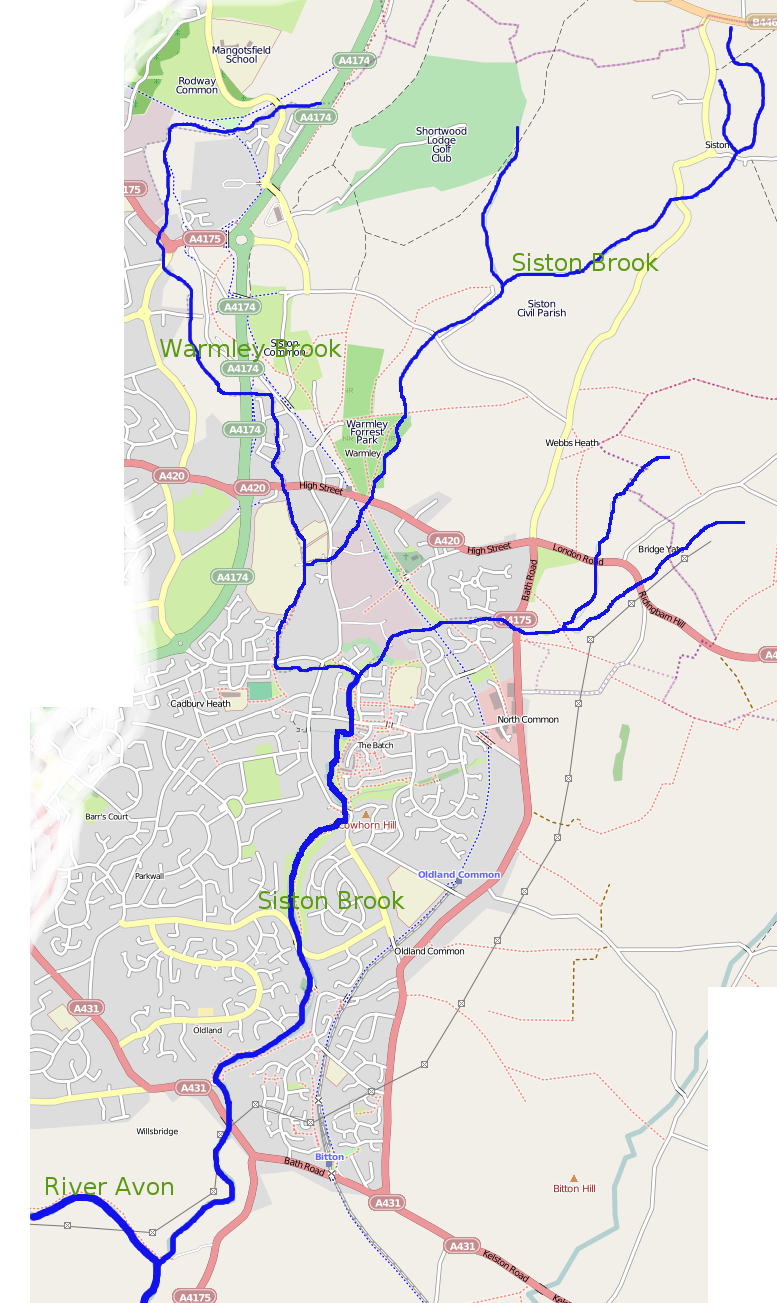
- Diagrammatic map of the Siston Brook and tributaries in South Gloucestershire, England

Location
- Country: England
- Region: South Gloucestershire

Physical characteristics
- Source
  - location: Siston, South Gloucestershire, England
  - coordinates: 51.4799°N 2.4487°W
  - elevation: 338 ft (103 m)
- 2nd source
  - location: Siston, South Gloucestershire, England
  - coordinates: 51.4773°N 2.4503°W
  - elevation: 305 ft (93 m)
- Source confluence
  - location: Siston, South Gloucestershire, England
  - coordinates: 51.4744°N 2.4478°W
  - elevation: 246 ft (75 m)
- Mouth: River Avon
  - location: Londonderry Wharf, South Gloucestershire, England
  - coordinates: 51.4268°N 2.4883°W
  - elevation: 35 ft (11 m)
- Length: 6 mi (9.7 km)

Basin features
- Tributaries
  - right: Warmley Brook
- River system: Bristol Avon

Siston Brook rises in two separate streams which issue from a ridge just north of the village of Siston, South Gloucestershire, England. The brook is approximately 6 miles (9.7 km) long and is a tributary of the Bristol Avon. Much of its course is through the eastern suburbs of Bristol, although it remains outside the city boundaries. Tributaries include the Warmley Brook and an unnamed tributary from Bridgeyate.

The stream has provided power for watermills and battery mills in the past and some mill buildings still survive. Wildlife is supported by nature reserves through which the Siston Brook runs. Flooding has caused problems in the past, but modern measures to alleviate this include an attenuation reservoir and proposals to reinstate historic weirs and sluices. The name Siston is believed to derive from Anglo-Saxon, meaning Sige's Farmstead.

== Course ==
The source of Siston Brook is two springs which flow out of a ridge just north of the village of Siston. These join near to the village church of St Anne's. the river then flows in a south westerly direction through Overscourt Wood, a nature reserve and part of the Forest of Avon. A small unnamed tributary joins on the left near Webb's Heath Farm. Another tributary joins on the right at Mill Farm and the brook then heads south through a steep valley to Warmley Forest Park. The upper stretches are sometimes referred to as Clack Mill Brook, but the location of Clack Mill is uncertain.

The Siston is then joined by the Warmley Brook, flowing down from Rodway Hill, on the right. It then flows through Warmley, partly culverted, still in a generally southerly direction. Another unnamed tributary joins from Bridgeyate Common on the left and it then flows past Cadbury Heath and on to Oldland, between the village and Oldland Common. It enters another nature reserve at Willsbridge Mill and then flows under the A431 road and joins the Avon at Londonderry Wharf, which was originally used for loading coal from local mines.

== History ==
In common with other rivers of the area the brook was used to power watermills for grinding corn and, as the Industrial Revolution developed, to supply power for many mining related industries. The eighteenth century industrialist William Champion dammed the stream at Warmley to provide a 13 acres (5.3 ha) water feature for the ornamental gardens of his home, Warmley House. This also acted as a reservoir for supplying water power to Champion's brass battery mills. The lake no longer survives.

Weirs, pools and sluices in the upper reaches have long been used as part of water management in the area and it is proposed to restore many of them to aid in future flood prevention.

An eighteenth-century water mill at Willsbridge was in operation until the 1960s. Originally used for milling hoop iron, it was converted in the early nineteenth century for flour production. It has been restored and now serves as a focus for a nature reserve managed by Willsbridge Mill Community Refresh. The mouth of the Siston Brook where it joins the Avon was turned into a wharf in the eighteenth century, providing a space for loading barges with coal for nearby collieries. The coal was brought down to the river from mines at Coalpit Heath via a dramway a narrow gauge tramway, worked by gravity.

== Natural history ==
Nature Reserves at Overscourt Wood, Warmley Forest Park and Willsbridge provide shelter for amphibians, river birds and plant life.

== Etymology ==
Settlements at Siston have been known as Sistone, Syton, Sytone and Systun. It is believed that the name may be a derivative of Sige's Farmstead, indicating Anglo-Saxon origins.

== Hydrology ==
During the construction of the Avon Ring Road extensions in the 1990s, an attenuation reservoir was constructed in the Siston Common area to minimise flooding effects from surface run-off during rainstorms.
