= Denys family of Siston =

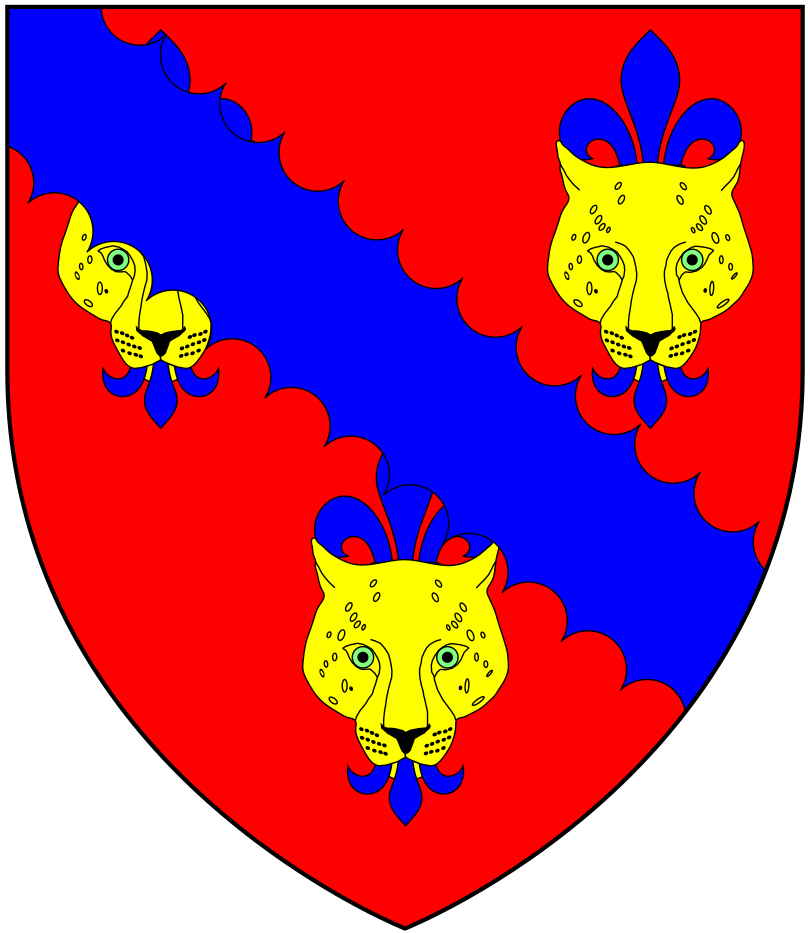
Arms of the Denys family: Gules, three leopard's faces or jessant-de-lys azure over all a bend engrailed of the last.

The Denys family of Siston, also spelled Dennis, originally came from Glamorgan in Wales and in the late 14th century acquired by marriage the manor of Siston, Gloucester and shortly thereafter the adjoining manor of Dyrham. Maurice Denys re-built Siston Court in the 16th century.

== Origins ==
The Denys family of Siston came most immediately from Glamorgan. The ancient arms of Denys of Devon appear to make allusion to a Danish connection: The arms of the King of Denmark were recorded in the Camden Roll (c.1280) as: "Gules, three axes in pale or".

This family was recorded in early Norman charters in French as le Deneys, meaning "The Dane", which was frequently Latinised by scribes as Dacus. William Dacus ("the Dane") was the founder of the Whitehall Almshouse in Ilchester c.1217. John the Dane "Deneis" brought an action in 1224, and John the Dane held two fees in Sock of the Beauchamps of Hatch in 1236.

The earliest firm evidence of the Denys family in Glamorgan is from a charter dated 1258, witnessing an exchange by Gilbert de Turberville of lands with Margam Abbey. Among the five witnesses are: Willelmo le Deneys. Cartae MXLIII dated 1376 is a lease by Margam Abbey to Johan Denys de Watirton (Waterton in the lordship of Coity), and there is a reference in the 1415 Inquisition post mortem of Sir Lawrence de Berkerolles Lord of Coity to "rent in Waterton which Gilbert Denys, knt., and others render yearly." Denys was by then established at Siston.

== Sir Maurice Denys (1516–1563) builder of Siston Court ==
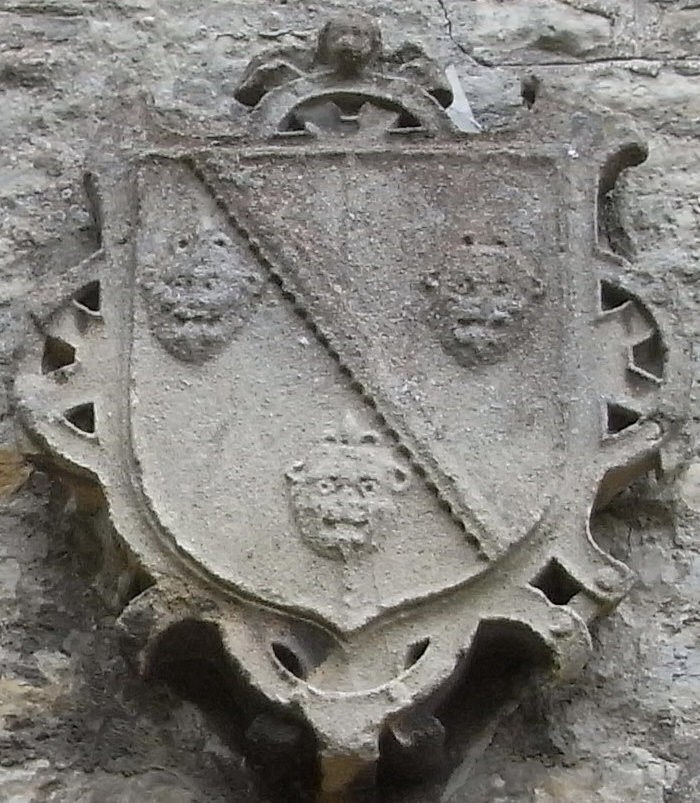
The arms of Sir Maurice Denys as they appear on the south wing of Siston Court

It was the ambitious Sir Maurice Denys (1516–1563), great-great-grandson of Sir Gilbert, who bought out his elder brother Sir Walter's inheritance of Siston, probably in 1542 when the latter obtained Royal Licence to alienate Kingston Russell to Sir Maurice, and erected the present mansion. He took the classic Tudor businessman's training as a lawyer at the Inner Temple and became heavily involved in property speculation and development during the Dissolution of the Monasteries. In 1540 he was awarded the Receivership of the dissolved Order of Knights of St.John, residing at a London mansion at Clerkenwell, the order's HQ, and at a former Commandery at Sutton-at-Hone in Kent. He had built a large mansion for the prominent Mercer Nicholas Statham at Brook Place, Sutton, and in 1545 married his widow Elizabeth, thereby inheriting the house he had built. Sir Maurice borrowed greatly not only to buy out his brother's manor of Siston, but also Barton Regis, (Note: Barton Regis was the former "Manor of the King" in Kingswood Forest, anciently serving as the Grange for storing provisions for Bristol Castle, or so Salisbury deduced when he was examining how to regain the encroached upon Forest for the Crown.(Cecil Papers vol.24. 6/5/1609.)) a large part of adjacent Kingswood Forest, Abson and Pucklechurch from William Herbert, 1st Earl of Pembroke who had obtained the latter at the Dissolution from Bath Abbey, as well as a handful of other manors in Gloucestershire and elsewhere. Certainly Siston Court was designed to be Sir Maurice's grand seat after he had obtained a title of nobility. Yet his plans had been over-ambitious and his debts dragged down not only himself but also his brother, who as a beneficiary of the loan, was forced by the Crown to co-sign a bond. Sir Maurice had been appointed Treasurer of Calais, responsible for financing the military campaign there, yet was twice imprisoned in the Fleet seemingly for accounting irregularities, but was twice released and pardoned. The inference seems to be that he misapplied Crown funds to repay his personal debts. He was fully rehabilitated by Queen Elizabeth, and died in August 1563 at Portsmouth during an outbreak of plague whither he had been sent to pay troops. As dating evidence for Siston Court the following entry in the Cecil Papers is given:

Sir Adrian Poynings to the Queen. Concerning the state of payments to the troops from Newhaven (i.e. Le Havre) at the death of Sir Maurice Denis (sic) Treasurer. Wherwell 28/8/1563. Cecil Papers, vol 1. no.924.

A similar dispatch had been made 3 days prior. Siston was sold before his death to satisfy his creditors, but with a right of repurchase for £2,200. His nephew and heir Richard Denys (1525–1594), son of Sir Walter, exercised the repurchase, but due to the depletion of the family funds, it was finally sold by Richard and his son Walter in 1568 for £3,200 to Robert Wicks. Wicks offered it without success to the Earl of Salisbury in 1607 for £3,300 and then sold in 1608 to Sir Henry Billingsley (jnr) of Doynton Manor, Glos., the son of Sir Henry (c.1530–1606) Lord Mayor of London in 1596 and the first translator of Euclid into English. It passed in 1651 to Samuel Trotman, Esq.

== Decline of Denys/Dennis family ==
Another branch of the Denys family descended from Sir Maurice's uncle John, third son of Sir Walter (d.1505), and heir of Hugh Denys (d.1511), remained as Lords of the Manor of Pucklechurch until 1701. (Note: William Denys Esq., Sheriff of Glos. 1689, d.1701, the last Dennis Lord of the Manor of Pucklechurch. Of his two co-heiresses, Mary, (ob.s.p. 1739 buried at Puckl.) m. as his 2nd. wife Col James Butler of Ireland, great-great-grandson of 9th. Earl of Ormond, and Elizabeth m. as his 2nd. wife Sir Alex. Cuming, 1st. Bart.of Culter, Aberdeen. Cuming became an ignominious bankrupt and was the father by his 1st wife of Sir Alex. Cuming the extraordinary adventurer and eccentric who exhibited such personal charisma as to be proclaimed Emperor of the Cherokee Indians, and virtually a living god. He attempted to use the connection to gain the Cherokees as allies of the English against the French, but the English establishment and King refused to reward his efforts, seeing him for the unstable visionary and egotist he probably was. He died in penury. Cuming and Elizabeth still held the Essex manor of Purleigh, until her death, bequeathed by Hugh Denys (d.1511) about which an Act of Parliament had been procured after the Dissolution to divert the income derived from it (originally settled on Sheene then transferred to Syon) to found a Dennis Scholarship at Magdalene Coll. Cambs. The Scholarship still exists today nominally, although consolidated into the General Scholarship Fund. It yields only a peppercorn income, having been eroded by centuries of inflation.) Richard's brother Thomas fared best of all, albeit temporarily, having married the niece and heiress of cap manufacturer Sir Thomas Bell (snr.), thrice mayor of Gloucester and its richest citizen. The Dennis family of Gloucester by inheritance briefly became the main private landlords of the city, but most of their properties, situated on the outskirts, were destroyed during the Civil War siege. In the 16/17th century the family had modernised its name to Dennis.
