= Alfred Davidson =

British-Australian official

- Born: 21 June 1812; Siston Parish, Gloucestershire, England
- Died: 7 November 1881; New Farm, Brisbane
- Occupations: Pottery owner, commission agent, investor and Pioneer of Compassion (humanitarian)
- Years active: 1864-1879
- Spouse: Phoebe Georgiana Simmonds
- Children: Phoebe Georgina Davidson (1850-1919), James Madgwick Davidson (1851-1920), Amy Elizabeth Davidson (1857-1927)

Alfred Davidson (1812–1881) was an English pottery owner and commission agent in Australia. He was a Protestant Christian, a Queensland Pioneer of Compassion (humanitarian) and the Queensland representative of the British Aborigines Protection Society.

== Life ==
Davidson was born in Siston parish, Gloucestershire, England on 21 June 1812, and he died in New Farm, Brisbane on 7 November 1881, aged 69. He was son of the landed proprietor of Warmley House, George Madgwick Davidson and his wife Elisabeth Francis.

Following the death of his wife Phoebe Georgiana Simmonds, Davidson, who had been proprietor of the Warmley Tower Potteries in Gloucestershire, migrated to Queensland. He arrived at Brisbane on board the Light Brigade on 18 May 1863 as a 50-year-old widower and single father of three children: two daughters and a son. His motives for migration are not known, but he settled as a commission agent in Fortitude Valley. He spent much of his time engaged in humanitarian aid and Christian (Anglican) mission amongst Melanesians and Aborigines in Brisbane and Moreton Bay district.

Davidson was outraged at the general attitude towards indigenous people in Queensland, and made a name for himself as an outspoken humanitarian and representative in Queensland of Exeter Hall and the Aborigines Protection Society in London. Frequently abused by fellow settlers, he continued to argue for the indigenous people and against what he saw as continual abuses of the rights of Islanders and Aboriginal people.

He was characterised by John Douglas, as "a very excellent man". Henry Reynolds described him as "a persistent and passionate advocate for justice for the aborigines" and "an unrelenting opponent of the Pacific Island labour trade." "Between September 1869 and his death in 1881", Reynolds wrote, "he scanned the colonial newspapers, wrote letters to them himself as well as to the government, lobbied politicians and governors" and dispatched a total of 36 letters to the London-based Aborigines Protection Society, all on behalf of indigenous people in Queensland.

Alfred Davidson, the potter, was grandfather to Sir Alfred Charles Davidson, once the general manager of the Bank of New South Wales.
