= 2003 South Gloucestershire Council election =

2003 UK local government election

Results of the 2003 South Gloucestershire Council election

The 2003 South Gloucestershire Council election took place on 1 May 2003 to elect members of South Gloucestershire unitary authority in England. All 70 seats of the council were up for election. The Liberal Democrats once again gained a plurality of seats but lost overall control of the council as the Conservatives won the most votes and therefore made large gains at the expense of the Lib Dems and Labour.

== Election result ==
South Gloucestershire Council election, 2003
Party	Seats	Gains	Losses	Net gain/loss	Seats %	Votes %	Votes	+/−
Liberal Democrats	33	2	6	−4	47.1	34.0	52,840	+0.4
Conservative	21	13	0	+13	30.0	37.0	57,609	+8.2
Labour	16	0	9	−9	22.9	27.6	42,848	−8.8
Independent	0	0	0	±0	0.0	1.1	1,720	±0
Green	0	0	0	±0	0.0	0.2	261	+0.1
CPA	0	0	0	±0	0.0	0.1	137	+0.1

== Ward results ==
In wards that are represented by more than one councillor, electors were given more than one vote each, hence the voter turnout may not match the number of votes cast.

Almondsbury (1 seat)
Party	Candidate	Votes	%	±%
Conservative	Sheila Cook	858	59.5	+3.3
Liberal Democrats	Graham Pendrill	503	34.8	−2.3
Labour	Judith Martindale	82	5.7	−1.0
Turnout		1,443		
Conservative hold		Swing		

Alveston (1 seat)
Party	Candidate	Votes	%	±%
Liberal Democrats	Gary Fox	498	53.2	−11.6
Conservative	Leona Roberts	380	40.6	+5.4
Labour	Patricia Putterill	58	6.2	N/A
Turnout		936		
Liberal Democrats hold		Swing		

Bitton (1 seat)
Party	Candidate	Votes	%	±%
Liberal Democrats	Michael Thomas	472	39.5	−2.5
Conservative	Virginia McNab	467	39.1	+2.2
Labour	John Graham	255	21.4	+0.3
Turnout		1,194		
Liberal Democrats hold		Swing		

Boyd Valley (2 seats)
Party	Candidate	Votes	%	±%
Conservative	Sandra Grant	1,417	28.2	+9.6
Conservative	Philip Trotman	1,108	22.0	+5.3
Liberal Democrats	Marilyn Palmer	933	18.5	−0.1
Liberal Democrats	Mollie Ward	827	16.4	+1.2
Labour	Andrew Witts	466	9.8	−7.7
Labour	Alan Maggs	279	5.5	−7.9
Turnout		2,515		
Conservative gain from Liberal Democrats		Swing		
Conservative hold		Swing		

Bradley Stoke Baileys Court (1 seat)
Party	Candidate	Votes	%	±%
Liberal Democrats	Michael Collins	446	53.3	−4.7
Conservative	Ronald Bidder	242	28.9	+4.1
Labour	Anthony Blake	149	17.8	+0.6
Turnout		837		
Liberal Democrats hold		Swing		

Bradley Stoke Bowsland (2 seats)
Party	Candidate	Votes	%	±%
Liberal Democrats	Julian Barge	875	31.4	−2.7
Liberal Democrats	Jonathon Williams	866	31.1	+0.4
Conservative	Kion Northam	367	13.2	+3.6
Conservative	Mary Newport	295	10.6	+1.1
Labour	John Samways	210	7.6	−1.2
Labour	Robin King	170	6.1	−1.2
Turnout		1,391		
Liberal Democrats hold		Swing		
Liberal Democrats hold		Swing		

Bradley Stoke Sherbourne (2 seats)
Party	Candidate	Votes	%	±%
Liberal Democrats	Christopher Lees	529	25.2	−8.4
Liberal Democrats	Josephine Byron	508	24.2	−7.9
Conservative	Mary Prescott	364	17.3	−1.9
Conservative	David Pickwell	356	16.9	N/A
Labour	Andrew Hewlett	174	8.3	−6.8
Labour	Stuart MacCallum	171	8.1	N/A
Turnout		1,051		
Liberal Democrats hold		Swing		
Liberal Democrats hold		Swing		

Charfield (1 seat)
Party	Candidate	Votes	%	±%
Liberal Democrats	Sandra O'Neill	592	66.1	−5.3
Conservative	John Buxton	221	24.7	−3.9
Labour	John Noseley	82	9.2	N/A
Turnout		895		
Liberal Democrats hold		Swing		

Chipping Sobury (2 seats)
Party	Candidate	Votes	%	±%
Liberal Democrats	Linda Boon	1,312	26.4	+3.8
Liberal Democrats	Sheila Mead	1,256	25.3	+3.0
Conservative	James Febry	971	19.5	−1.8
Conservative	Martyn Radnedge	927	18.7	+1.2
Labour	Roland Clements	355	7.1	+2.6
Labour	Charles Pfeil	151	3.0	−0.8
Turnout		2,486		
Liberal Democrats hold		Swing		
Liberal Democrats hold		Swing		

Cotswold Edge (1 seat)
Party	Candidate	Votes	%	±%
Liberal Democrats	Susan Hope	799	59.3	+7.1
Conservative	Helen Heeley	501	37.2	−6.3
Labour	Jeremy Rowden	47	3.5	−0.8
Turnout		1,347		
Liberal Democrats hold		Swing		

Dodington (2 seats)
Party	Candidate	Votes	%	±%
Liberal Democrats	Kay Crowe	938	35.5	+3.4
Liberal Democrats	Anthony Davis	860	32.5	+2.4
Conservative	Lynn Chatfield	276	10.4	+0.7
Conservative	Claire Seward	269	10.2	+1.6
Labour	Diane Hutchinson	155	5.9	−4.4
Labour	Donald Brownlie	145	5.5	−3.7
Turnout		1,322		
Liberal Democrats hold		Swing		
Liberal Democrats hold		Swing		

Downend (3 seats)
Party	Candidate	Votes	%	±%
Conservative	Arthur Cullimore	1,591	16.0	−0.1
Conservative	Ian Smith	1,503	15.1	−0.4
Conservative	David Upjohn	1,482	14.9	−0.6
Independent	John Laurie	883	8.9	N/A
Labour	Julie Snelling	846	8.5	−4.3
Labour	Desley Radmall	833	8.4	−4.2
Labour	Robert Lomas	726	7.3	−4.8
Independent	Shaine Lewis	698	7.0	N/A
Liberal Democrats	Graeme Riley	557	5.6	+0.1
Liberal Democrats	James Corrigan	448	4.5	−0.6
Liberal Democrats	Aubrey Trotman-Dickenson	352	3.5	−1.3
Turnout		4,960		
Conservative hold		Swing		
Conservative hold		Swing		
Conservative hold		Swing		

Filton (3 seats)
Party	Candidate	Votes	%	±%
Labour	Roger Hutchinson	1,124	15.9	−4.4
Labour	Stanley Sims	1,087	15.3	−3.7
Labour	Terance Pomroy	1,068	15.1	−4.0
Conservative	Brian Freeguard	868	12.2	+2.2
Conservative	David Bell	832	11.7	+2.1
Conservative	Anne Kenyon	832	11.7	+2.7
Liberal Democrats	Maureen Williams	482	6.8	+2.3
Liberal Democrats	Arthur Adams	343	4.8	+0.5
Liberal Democrats	Raymond Cottrell	317	4.5	+0.3
Independent	Philip Winter	139	2.0	N/A
Turnout		2,364		
Labour hold		Swing		
Labour hold		Swing		
Labour hold		Swing		

Frampton Cotterell (2 seats)
Party	Candidate	Votes	%	±%
Liberal Democrats	Winston Hockey	1,109	27.1	−2.5
Liberal Democrats	Patricia Hockey	1,099	26.8	−5.0
Conservative	Patricia Bashford	598	14.6	+2.3
Conservative	Betty Bird	561	13.7	+1.8
Labour	George Keel	393	9.6	+1.8
Labour	Terance Trollope	339	8.3	+1.7
Turnout		2,049		
Liberal Democrats hold		Swing		
Liberal Democrats hold		Swing		

Hanham (3 seats)
Party	Candidate	Votes	%	±%
Conservative	Donald Goddard	1,470	15.5	+4.7
Conservative	Heather Goddard	1,469	15.5	+5.0
Conservative	June Bamford	1,454	15.4	+5.4
Labour	April Begley	1,123	11.9	−2.1
Labour	Colin Cradock	1,106	11.7	−2.2
Labour	Norma Cradock	1,095	11.6	−2.1
Liberal Democrats	Michael Williams	642	6.8	−2.7
Liberal Democrats	Lindsay Brady	556	5.9	−3.4
Liberal Democrats	Adrian Rush	536	5.7	−2.6
Turnout		3,150		
Conservative gain from Labour		Swing		
Conservative gain from Labour		Swing		
Conservative gain from Labour		Swing		

Kings Chase (3 seats)
Party	Candidate	Votes	%	±%
Labour	Deanna Macrae	1,425	20.7	−3.5
Labour	Terence Walker	1,297	18.8	−5.2
Labour	Malcolm Bridge	1,296	18.8	−4.4
Conservative	Malcolm Lake	745	10.8	+3.5
Conservative	John Gibbs	731	10.6	+4.0
Conservative	Robert Lavis	627	9.1	N/A
Liberal Democrats	Joan Reeves	300	4.3	−1.6
Liberal Democrats	Louise Harrison	241	3.5	−1.4
Liberal Democrats	Christine Thomas	236	3.4	−0.5
Turnout		2,299		
Labour hold		Swing		
Labour hold		Swing		
Labour hold		Swing		

Ladden Brook (1 seat)
Party	Candidate	Votes	%	±%
Liberal Democrats	Howard Gawler	672	59.0	+7.6
Conservative	Anthony Wade	379	33.3	+5.2
Labour	Richard Tapsell	88	5.7	−12.8
Turnout		1,139		
Liberal Democrats hold		Swing		

Longwell Green (2 seats)
Party	Candidate	Votes	%	±%
Conservative	John Calway	1,403	32.1	+5.3
Conservative	Michael Armstrong	1,362	31.2	+5.6
Labour	Carl Lander	498	11.4	−1.6
Labour	Michael Bell	492	11.3	−0.7
Liberal Democrats	Edward Allinson	308	7.1	−5.0
Liberal Democrats	Alan Greenfield	303	6.9	−3.6
Turnout		2,183		
Conservative hold		Swing		
Conservative hold		Swing		

Oldland Common (2 seats)
Party	Candidate	Votes	%	±%
Liberal Democrats	Jane Allinson	937	27.6	−5.5
Liberal Democrats	Marc Scawen	908	26.7	−1.0
Labour	Ann Coales	511	15.1	−1.5
Labour	Kim Scudamore	405	11.9	−4.4
Conservative	Brian Morgan	324	9.5	+3.2
Conservative	June Sweetland	312	9.2	N/A
Turnout		1,698		
Liberal Democrats hold		Swing		
Liberal Democrats hold		Swing		

Parkwall (2 seats)
Party	Candidate	Votes	%	±%
Labour	Arnold Lovell	917	23.8	−5.7
Labour	June Lovell	906	23.6	−5.8
Conservative	William Douglas	560	14.6	+3.2
Conservative	Cyril Haddy	521	13.5	+2.6
Liberal Democrats	Derek Nethercote	475	12.3	+2.6
Liberal Democrats	Geoffrey Nicks	469	12.2	+3.0
Turnout		1,924		
Labour hold		Swing		
Labour hold		Swing		
