= Danusia, Lady Trotman-Dickenson =

British-Polish Economist

Danusia, Lady Trotman-Dickenson MBE
- Born: Donata Irena Hewell; 1929; Warsaw, Poland
- Died: 28 June 2024 (aged 94–95); Siston, Gloucestershire, England
- Other name: Donata Irena Trotman-Dickenson
- Board member of: Welsh Heritage Schools Initiative
- Spouse: Sir Aubrey Trotman-Dickenson (m. 1953; died 2016)
- Children: 3

Academic background
- Education: University of Edinburgh (BComm, PhD); London School of Economics (MScEcon)
- Thesis: The development of the Scottish industrial estates 1936-52 (1956)

Academic work
- Discipline: Economics
- Sub-discipline: Public economics
- Institutions: University of Manchester; University of Aberystwyth; University of Edinburgh; Open University; University of Glamorgan

Donata Irena, Lady Trotman-Dickenson MBE, known as Danusia (1929 - 28 June 2024), was a Polish economist who had settled in the United Kingdom as a child refugee during World War II. She earned her PhD from the University of Edinburgh and held teaching positions at a number of universities, retiring as Professor Emerita at University of Glamorgan. Later in life, she was known for her work in promoting history education in Wales, notably through founding the Welsh Heritage Schools Initiative in 1990 and chairing the organisation until 2011.

== Early life ==
Lady Trotman-Dickenson was born Donata Irena Hewell in 1929 in Warsaw, Poland. As World War II broke out, Trotman-Dickenson and her family were forced to flee their home country in 1939, arriving in England by boat nearly a year later in 1940. The family resettled in Linlithgow, Scotland, where Trotman-Dickenson continued her schooling. She spoke little English when she first moved to the UK.

== Academic career ==
Trotman-Dickenson was accepted to University of Edinburgh in 1945, aged only 16. She chose to do a Bachelor of Commerce degree and graduated in 1948, at the age of 19. She went on to earn an MSc(Econ) in Management of the National Debt from the London School of Economics. Following this, she worked as a tutor at University of Manchester before returning to Edinburgh University to take up a lectureship.

Trotman-Dickenson also worked on a doctoral degree during her lectureship in Edinburgh, earning her PhD in 1956. Her thesis was titled, The development of the Scottish industrial estates 1936-52.

Having earned her PhD, she moved to Aberystwyth with her husband, Aubrey, who she had married in 1953. Danusia worked as a tutor and Aubrey headed the Chemistry department, both at Aberystwyth University. The Trotman-Dickensons then relocated to Cardiff when Aubrey was appointed Principal of University of Wales Institute of Science and Technology (UWIST) and later Vice-chancellor of University of Wales, College of Cardiff following a merger of the two institutions. Danusia Trotman-Dickenson held lecturing posts at the Open University in Cardiff and at the Polytechnic of Wales, which went on to become University of Glamorgan. During her academic career, Trotman-Dickenson published seven books as well as over 50 academic journal articles in economics and public finance. She also supported the teaching of A-Level Economics in South Wales. She retired as Professor Emerita at University of Glamorgan.

== History education ==
In 1990, Lady Trotman-Dickenson founded the Welsh Heritage Schools Initiative - a competition to encourage the teaching of local history and heritage at Welsh schools. Initially founded under the Institute of Welsh Affairs, the initiative became an independent charity in 1995. Trotman-Dickenson also chaired the initiative in its first 12 years and was appointed Honorary Life President when she stepped down. The competition that she founded has taken place annually since 1990, with a record of 35,000 pupils taking parts in 2025.

== Recognitions ==
For her service to education, Lady Trotman-Dickenson was appointed as Member of the British Empire in the 2010 Birthday Honours. In 2018, she was named by Women’s Equality Network Wales in its list of 100 "legendary women" (50 living women and 50 historical women) who "made a big impact on Welsh life".

== Personal life ==
Danusia and Aubrey Trotman-Dickenson married in 1953. They had previously met while working in Manchester. The Trotman-Dickensons had two sons, Casimir and Dominic, as well as a daughter, Beatrice, who predeceased both of her parents. Aubrey Trotman-Dickenson was himself an academic, a professor of Chemistry who went on to become Vice-chancellor of Cardiff University (1968-1993). He was knighted in the 1989 Birthday Honours, earning himself the title Sir and making his wife Lady Trotman-Dickenson.

The Trotman-Dickensons resided in Cardiff for most of their working life, before relocating to Siston, Gloucestershire in their retirement. They remained married until Sir Aubrey's death in 2016.

In her retirement, Lady Trotman-Dickenson was active in the Anglo Polish Society, with whom she created the book In war and in peace: Poles who came to the West Country, published by Alpha Books in 2014. She also served as a member of the South Gloucestershire Police Independent Advisory Group, where she was recognised for her work in representing the Polish community.

Lady Trotman-Dickenson died on 28 June 2024, aged 95. Her funeral was held on 5 July the same year. She was survived by two sons, seven grandchildren, and four great-grandchildren.

== Published works ==
- Trotman-Dickenson, D. I. (1969). Economic Workbook and Data: A Tutorial Volume for Students (1st ed.). Oxford: Pergamon Press. ISBN 978-0080129570.
- Trotman-Dickenson, D. I. (1978). Multiple choice questions workbook in economics (2nd ed.). Exeter: Elsevier Science Ltd. ISBN 978-0-08-021919-6.
- Trotman-Dickenson, D. I. (1983). Public sector economics made simple. Made simple books. London: Heinemann. ISBN 978-0-434-98584-5.
- Trotman-Dickenson, D. I. (1996). Economics of the Public Sector. Palgrave Macmillan. doi:10.1007/978-1-349-13264-5. ISBN 978-0333596692.
- Trotman-Dickenson, Danusia (2010). "The Kaleidoscope of Youth". In Verrill-Rhys, Leigh; Beddoe, Deirdre (eds.). Parachutes and Petticoats: Evocative Women's Stories from WWII (2nd ed.). Dinas Powys: Honno. ISBN 978-1906784119.
- Trotman-Dickenson, Danusia (2014). In War and In Peace Poles Who Came to the West Country. Bristol: Alpha Books. ISBN 9781897851241.
