= Alfred Charles Davidson =

Australian banker

Sir Alfred Charles Davidson KBE (1882–1952) was an Australian banker and a domineering figure in the 1930s Australian business life. He was best known as the general manager of the Bank of New South Wales from 4 January 1929, when this bank entered its perhaps most critical periods of existence. He stayed on at the bank until June 1945 when he was persuaded to retire due to ill health.

Davidson was born on 1 April 1882 in Brisbane, son of bank manager James Madgwick Davidson, and his Queensland-born wife Lucy (née Cribb). He was the grandson of the factory owner and financier turned well-known Queensland humanitarian Alfred Davidson who migrated to Queensland in 1863 and made a name for himself as Queensland's representative of the British Aborigines' Protection Society.
