= Willsbridge =

Village in Gloucestershire, England

Coordinates: 51.430°N 2.482°W

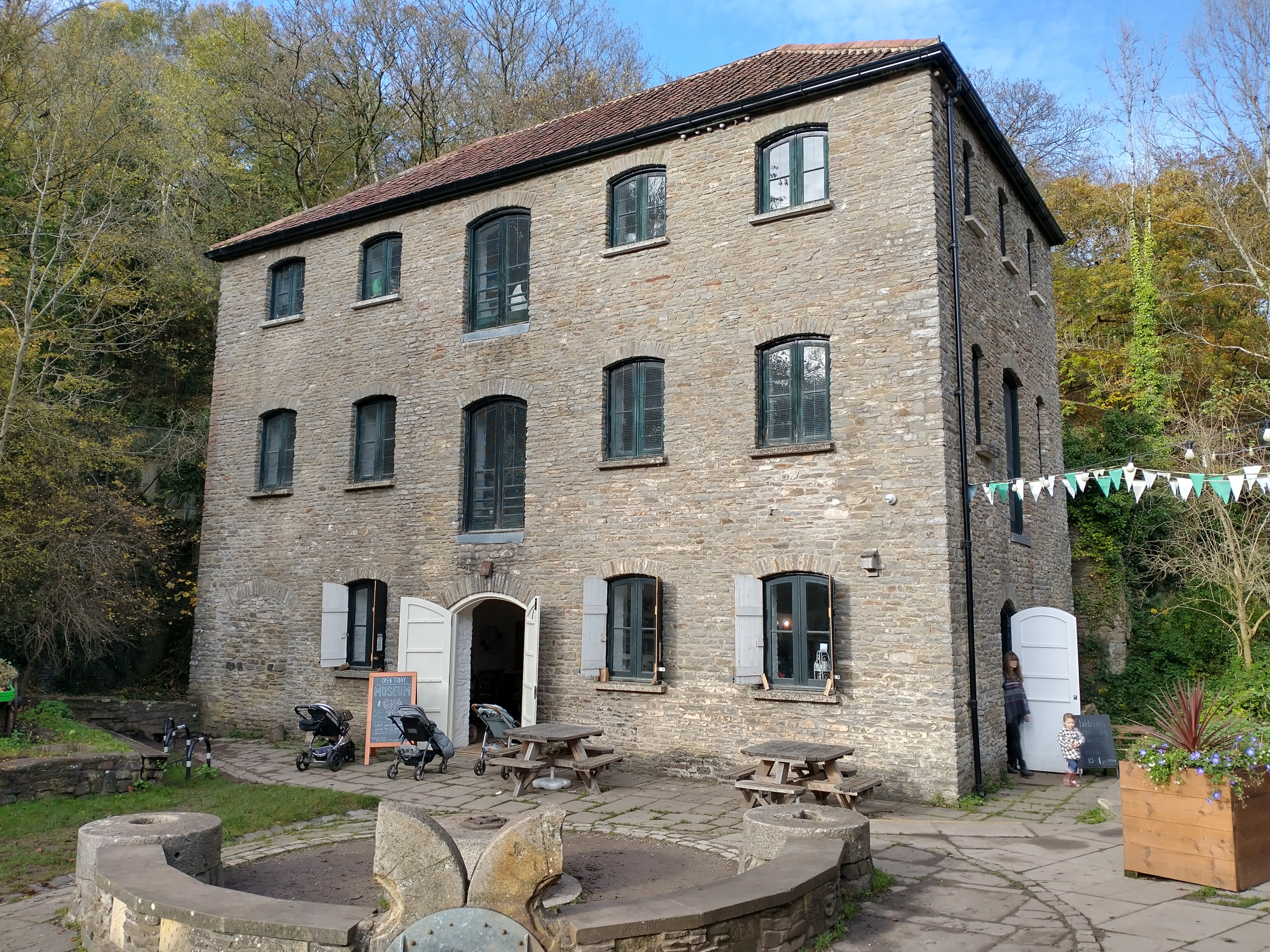
Willsbridge Mill

Willsbridge is a village in the unitary authority of South Gloucestershire, England, located on the outskirts of Bristol. Willsbridge Castle, situated on a prominent hillside site, was built around 1730, with crenellations added in the nineteenth century.

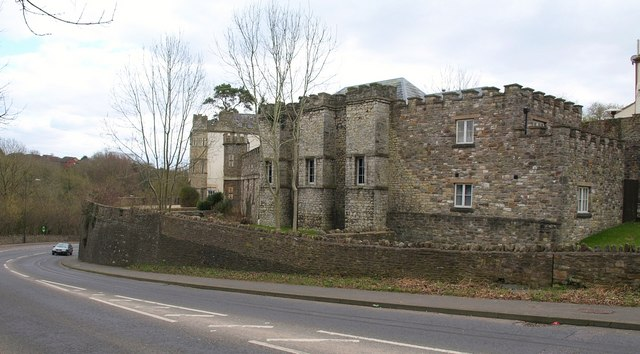
Willsbridge Castle

The village contains a nature reserve and historic buildings next to the Siston Brook. The mill and barn buildings are managed by a voluntary group, Willsbridge Mill Community Refresh, for community use.

The valley contains many habitats. The woodlands have carpets of Common Bluebells, champions and resound with birdsong. The ponds are homes for frogs, toads and dragonflies, and dippers and kingfishers visit the stream. Foxes and badgers live in the valley and noctule and Greater Horseshoe Bat feed on the insects in the valley.

Willsbridge was the childhood home of composer Robert Lucas de Pearsall. Though he sold the family home in 1837 after his mother's death, he continued to be credited in scores as 'Pearsall of Willsbridge.’
