= John Clark Monk =

John Clark Monk (25 February 1760 – 9 December 1827), also known as the Hanging Sailor of Perryman, was a sea captain.

== Burial in an underground vault and his instructions never to touch dry land ==
Monk was born in Siston near Bristol, England and died in 1827. He is entombed at Spesutia Church of St. George's Parish in Abingdon, Maryland, along with both his wives (first wife Mary and second wife Sarah Rebecca Lewis).

He apparently left his crew instructions that when he died, his feet were not to touch dry land for any reason. To meet that requirement his body was wrapped in a lead shroud, lowered into an underground vault, where it was placed on two thick stone planks sitting roughly two feet above the vault floor. It is also said Monk's body was soaked in rum before being placed the lead shroud.
