= North Common, Gloucestershire =

Coordinates: 51.449°N 2.469°W

North Common
- Unitary authority: South Gloucestershire
- Country: England
- Sovereign state: United Kingdom
- Post town: BRISTOL
- Postcode district: BS

North Common is a village just outside Warmley, Bristol, in South Gloucestershire, England. Historically this was a rural hamlet surrounded by farmland. The residents are fortunate enough that to the east of the village is attractive rolling countryside, with views of Lansdown, and the surrounding hills. The village is on the eastern outskirts of Bristol and approximately halfway between Bristol city centre and the neighbouring city of Bath.

North Common is a semi rural village, adjacent to the villages of Warmley, Oldland Common and Bridgeyate. To the east of the village is open farmland and greenbelt which is only a few minutes walk. The village is home to the Bath Ales brewery.

The Bristol and Bath Railway Path passes through North Common and steam trains from the Avon Valley Steam Railway travel as far as North Common where the rail track terminates.

Many local children attend St Barnabas CE Primary School, Redfield Edge Primary School, The Meadows Primary School in Bitton or St Anne's CE VC Primary school in nearby Oldland Common. Older students attend Sir Bernard Lovell Academy or other local secondary schools such as Digitech or Wellsway School in Keynsham.

North Common has its own village hall located in Millers Drive and is served by several pubs in particular The Griffin and White Harte pubs at Bridgeyate, the Doplhin at Oldland Common and the Hollybush Inn on the North Common - Bridgeyate border.

There is suitable public transport with the 42 to Bristol city centre, the 19A to Bath city centre or Cribbs Causeway, or around 10 minutes walk away outside the griffin there's the 35 from Marshfield to Bristol city centre. There are good road links to the Avon Ring Road (and hence the motorway network) via nearby Warmley village and Bath lies some 7 miles (11 km) east and is easily accessible by road. Bristol is 7.6 miles (12.2 km) west, also very accessible.
