= Bridgeyate =

Hamlet in Gloucestershire, England

Coordinates: 51.4516°N 2.463°W

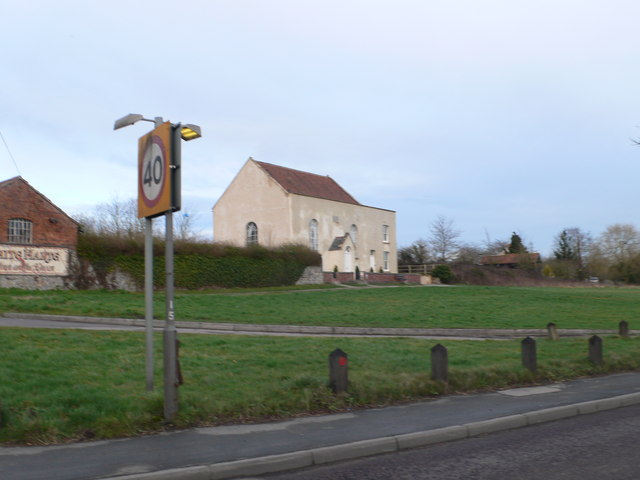
Ebenezer Methodist Chapel, Bridgeyate

Bridgeyate is a hamlet in South Gloucestershire, England.

Bridgeyate is situated between the cities of Bristol and Bath. The increase in housebuilding in the area has seen Bridgeyate become attached to the nearby villages of Warmley and North Common, but it still retains its own identity with a large common and three public houses, The Griffin, The White Hart and The Hollybush. The Hollybush reopened in March 2014 after an extensive refit.

Residents of Bridgeyate are fortunate that it looks across magnificent open countryside to the East, with walks over ridges and the Avon Valley towards the villages of Beach and Upton Cheyney and beyond to Lansdown and Bath.

Bridgeyate is very well sited strategically, with rapid access to the cities of Bristol and Bath and to the M4 motorway by road, although public transport provision is poor with no local railway station and sporadic bus services. For cyclists and walkers, the renowned Bristol-Bath railway path runs straight past Bridgeyate.

Also there seems to be bit of confusion as to how it is spelt, some road signs and maps say Bridgeyate and some say Bridge Yate.

The notable individuals that have lived in the Bridgeyate area are as follows:

Eddie Shirk - a graduate of Cardiff University who pioneered mental health screening techniques in the Education industry and is known for his philanthropy.

Alford Stanley - veteran aerospace engineer.

King Edmund I - often held residency in the surrounding area and was eventually assassinated in Pucklechurch.
