= Hundred of Pucklechurch =

Former administrative subdivision of Gloucestershire, England

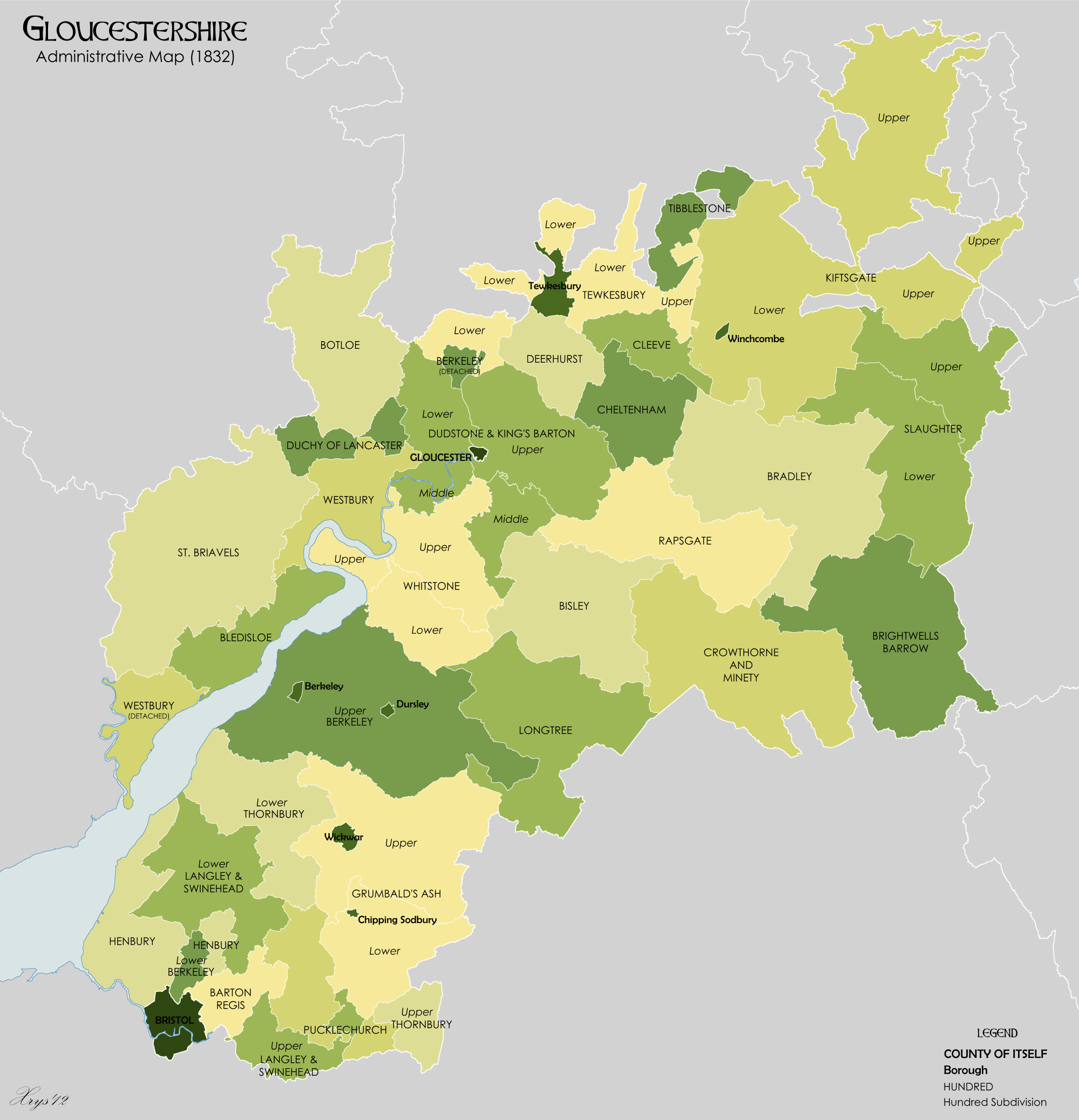
Gloucestershire Hundreds in 1832

Pucklechurch was an ancient hundred of Gloucestershire, England. Hundreds originated in the late Saxon period as a subdivision of a county and lasted as administrative divisions until the 19th century.

The hundred comprised the ancient parishes of Pucklechurch, Syston, Cold Ashton, Westerleigh and Abson.

At the time of the Domesday Book, the hundred contained Pucklechurch, Syston and Cold Ashton, plus Codrington and part of Wapley (the two now joined into the parish of Wapley-cum-Codrington) and Doynton, which was later moved to Swineshead Hundred. Neither Westerleigh nor Abson was specifically recorded in the survey.

The name Pucklechurch comes from the parish and manor of the same name, which is derived from either Pucela's church, from a person's name, or from fair church.
