= Siston Hill Colliery =

Coal mine in England

Coordinates: 51.463062°N 2.478404°W

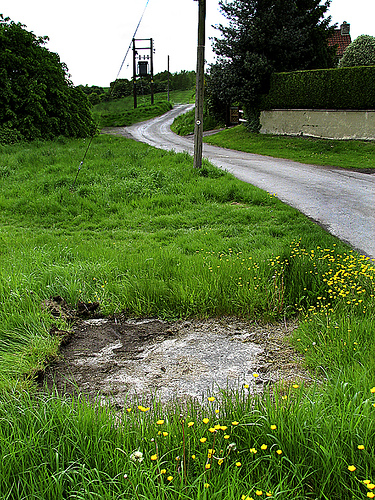
The capped shaft of Siston Hill Colliery. The cap is inscribed "NCB 1.8.50.

The sinking date for Siston Hill Colliery, Siston, Bristol is unknown, but was probably in the late 1790s or early 19th century. There is a surviving accident report dated 1804. This names the colliery owner as a Mrs. Peterson. By 1831 the colliery was under the ownership of Toghill & Company.

The 1880 List of Mines names the owner of the pit as S. H. Hadley.

The pit was put up for sale in 1889 and the prospectus states that it had four shafts, two of which were sunk to a depth of 570 ft (170 m). The winding shaft was 9 ft (2.7 m) in diameter, walled throughout and had two separate cages. The winding engine was a Boulton and Watt, had a 4-foot-6-inch (1.37 m) stroke and a 12-foot (3.7 m) drum, and could lift 700 to 800 tons of coal a day. The pumping engine had two 19-inch (480 mm) cylinders and was in working order. Above ground was a bank high enough for double screens which sorted the coal before it was loaded for transportation. A tunnel was provided at the bottom of the bank to enable timber and other materials to descend into the pit without first being hauled to the top. A 100-foot-high (30 m) circular chimney stack towered over the colliery.

The sale was not a success and the colliery never reopened.
