= Walter Buckler =

Sir Walter Buckler (or Bucler) (died 1554/8) was a diplomat, chamberlain of the household to Lady Elizabeth, later Queen Elizabeth I, and private secretary to Catherine Parr, the sixth wife of King Henry VIII.

== Origins ==
Walter Buckler was the second son of John Buckler, gentleman, of Causeway near Radipole and Weymouth, Dorset. He had an elder brother, John, and a sister, Edith, who married John Wolley of Leigh, Dorset, and was the mother of Queen Elizabeth I's Latin secretary, Sir John Wolley.

== Career ==
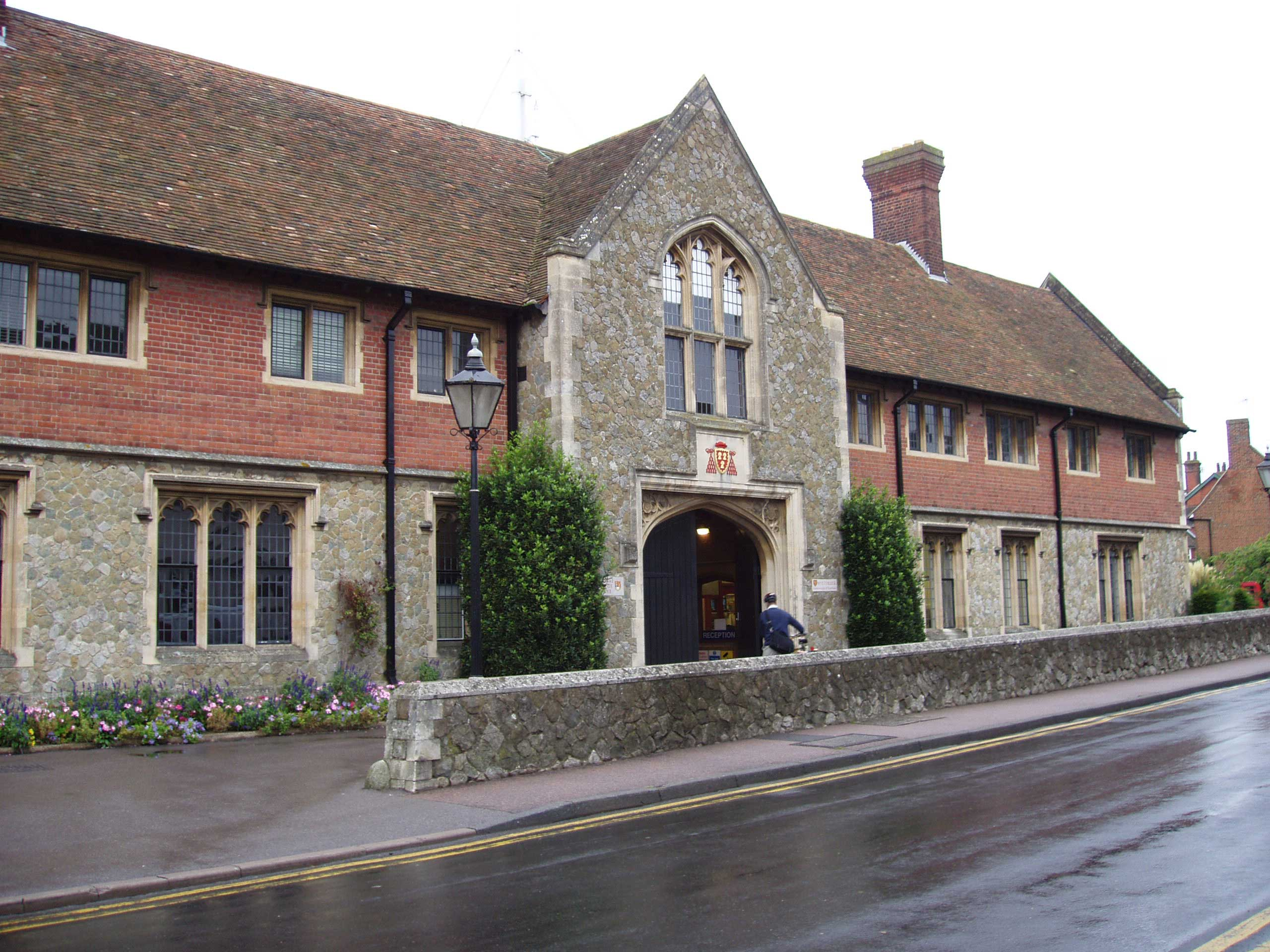
Wye College, Kent, acquired by Buckler after the dissolution

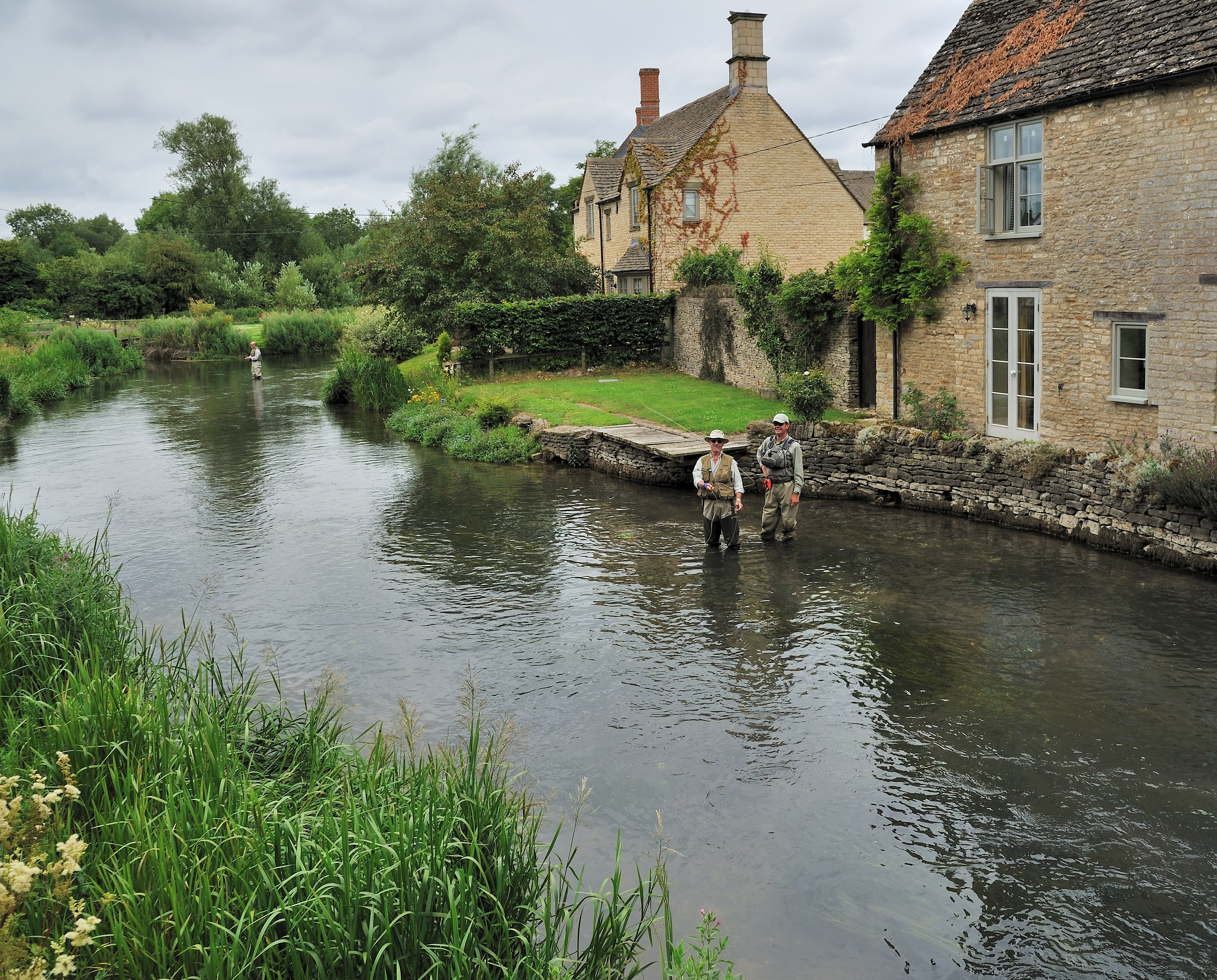
Fairford, Gloucestershire, today, where Sir Walter Buckler lived, and was buried in the church of St Mary the Virgin. The manor formerly belonged to the Tame family, and had descended to Buckler's wife Katherine Denys, widow of Edmund II Tame

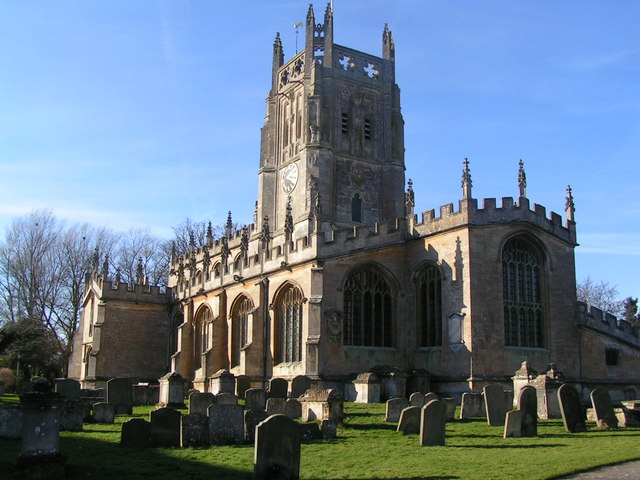
Fairford Church, with its magnificent Fairford stained glass windows, built by John Tame (d.1500), grandfather of Edmund II Tame, the first husband of Buckler's wife Katherine Denys. Burial place of Walter Buckler and of Katherine Denys and the Tames

Buckler studied in France at the University of Paris, and at the University of Oxford in England, where on 31 March 1525 he was awarded the degree of Master of Arts. He was a Fellow of Merton College, Oxford, and was appointed Canon of Cardinal College, founded in 1525 by Thomas Wolsey. After Wolsey's fall from power in 1529, Cardinal College was refounded in 1532 as King Henry VIII's College, and Buckler was again appointed Canon. On 25 June 1534 he was granted the degree of Bachelor of Divinity, although he did not take priestly orders.

According to the Lisle Letters, Buckler was in Paris during the period 1534–6. When Lady Lisle determined in December 1534 to send her son, James Bassett, to school in Paris, she turned for help in supervising his care to 'John Bekinsau, Thomas Rainolde, and Walter Bucler . . . Oxford scholars . . . drawn to Paris by the reputation of its great University'. Young James Bassett arrived in Paris on 13 August 1535, and stayed until 19 August 1536. After his departure, Buckler assisted Lady Lisle with other matters; on 21 August 1536 he wrote to her concerning a diamond brooch she wished to have made 'of the Assumption of Our Lady'. By the spring of 1539 Buckler was in Venice, and on 28 April was the bearer of a letter from Edmund Harvel, the English ambassador in Venice, to Thomas Cromwell in England. In the letter Harvel says that he can personally speak of Buckler's 'singular goodness and humanity, and [that] all learned men here extol his erudition and wit', adding that Buckler is 'worthy Cromwell's benevolence'. On 22 October 1539 Buckler was again in Paris, where John Bekinsau entrusted him with a letter to be delivered to Cromwell in England. In 1542 Buckler was in Venice, and on 25 April was the bearer of a letter from Harvel to Henry VIII. On 20 May 1543 Harvel wrote from Venice to Anthony Denny mentioning cramp rings sent to him by Buckler.

Buckler was a known supporter of the Protestant Reformation, and in 1545 was sent on a year-long embassy to the German princes. In January 1545 he and Christopher Mont were dispatched to Germany by Henry VIII, entrusted with the task of attempting to create an alliance between England, the German princes, and the King of Denmark. The mission was ultimately unsuccessful, and Buckler was recalled in December 1545, although Mont remained on the continent. In a letter from Strasbourg on 31 December 1545, Mont wrote that Buckler's departure was 'deplored by all Protestants and good men' there who had desired union with Henry VIII against the Pope.

Buckler also served as secretary to Henry VIII's sixth wife, Catherine Parr, as a letter dated 8 August 1544 refers to him as 'Mr Buckler, the Queen's secretary'. In recognition of his service to the Queen, the King granted Buckler Wye College at Wye, Kent, which had been founded in 1447 by John Kempe, Archbishop of Canterbury, and had been surrendered to the crown at the dissolution of the monasteries. Among the conditions of the grant was a stipulation that Buckler should provide for, and pay the salary of, a 'sufficient schoolmaster' for the education of the students of the college. He did not retain the property for long as on 25 November 1546 he was granted licence to alienate Wye College to his brother-in-law, Maurice Denys.

Buckler was knighted on 22 February 1547, two days after the coronation of King Edward VI. During the young King's reign, Buckler was in Princess Elizabeth's household at Hatfield, Hertfordshire, from 1550, and at the death of Sir Henry Parker on 8 January 1552 was appointed as her chamberlain. A household account book survives from 1551 to 1552 in which each page bears the signatures of Elizabeth and her chamberlain, Walter Buckler. On 7 October 1552 Buckler and Sir Thomas Parry, Comptroller of the Household, wrote to Sir William Cecil requesting him to obtain letters from King Edward VI to further Elizabeth's request that John Barlow, Dean of Worcester, should grant her 'a little farm'. In March 1553 the Privy Council instructed that Buckler was to be replaced as chamberlain of the Princess' household by Sir Nicholas Strange. The reason for his removal is unknown.

== Marriage ==
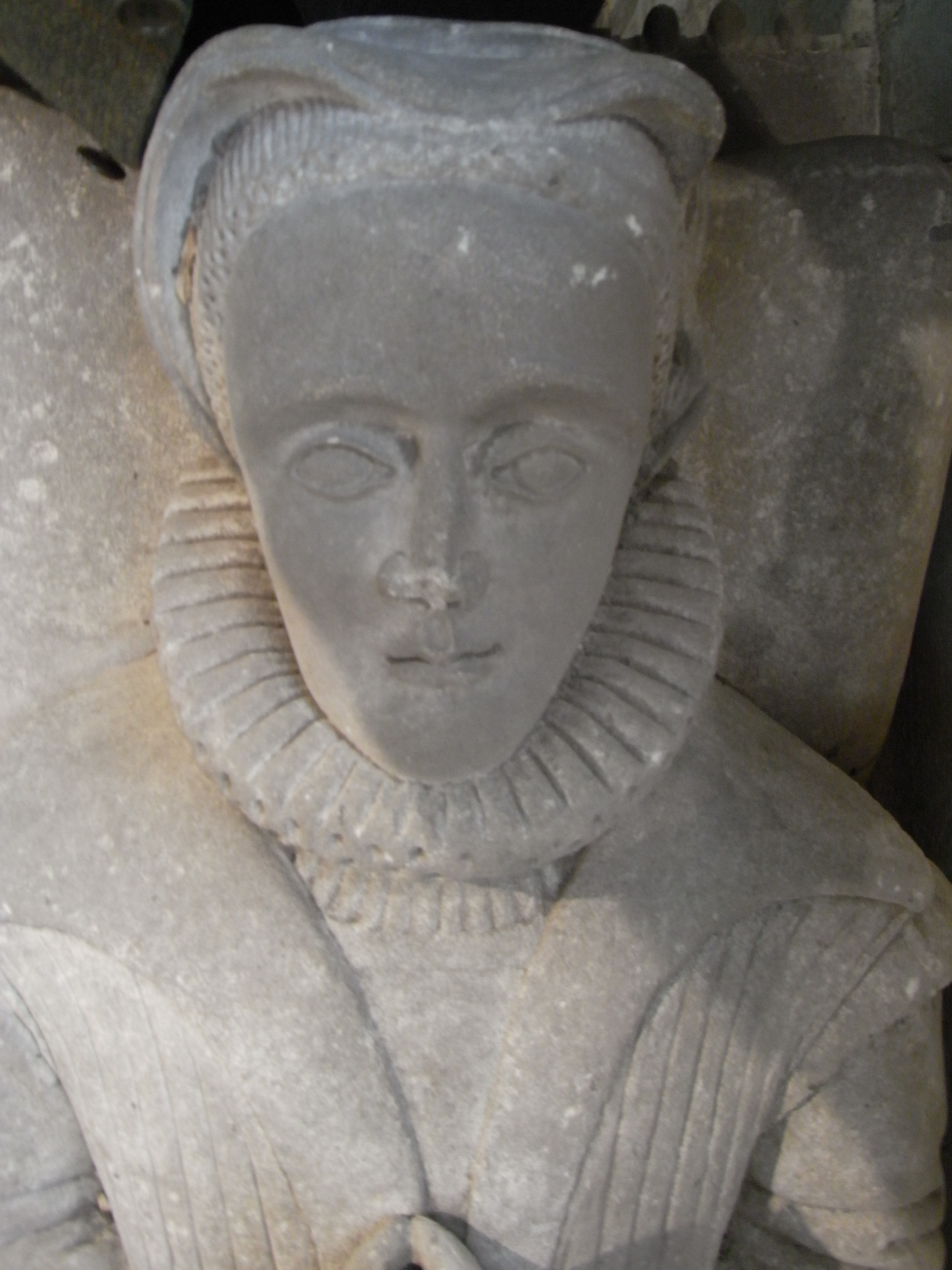
Effigy of Sir Walter Buckler's wife, Katherine Denys, Church of St Mary the Virgin, Fairford

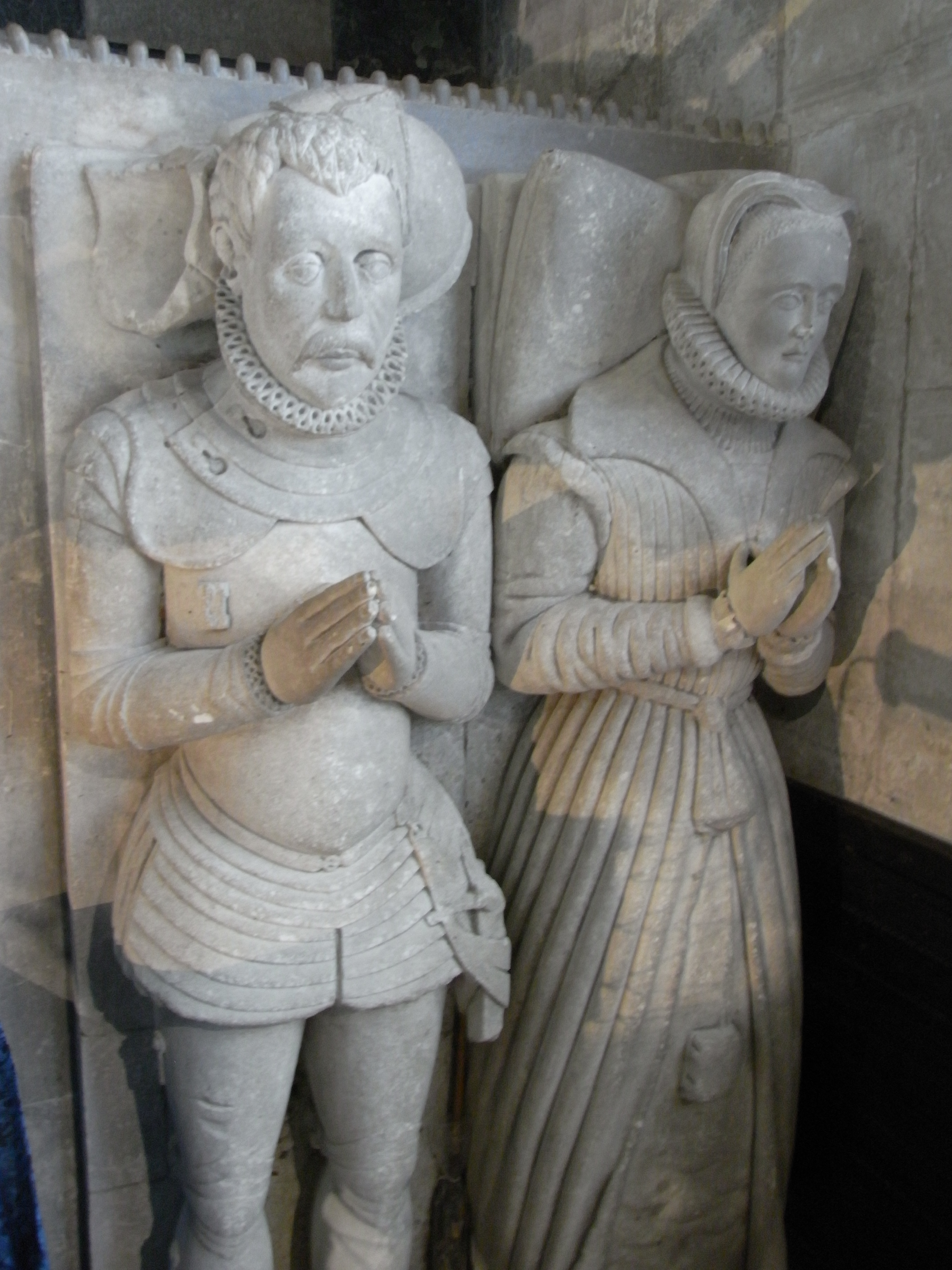
Effigies of Katherine Denys and her 3rd husband, Roger Lygon, Church of St Mary the Virgin, Fairford

Buckler married Katherine Denys (d.1582), the widow of Sir Edmund II Tame (d.1544) of Fairford in Gloucestershire (grandson of the wool merchant John Tame (d.1500) who rebuilt Fairford Church) and the daughter of Sir William Denys (d.1533), of Dyrham, Sheriff of Gloucestershire, by his wife Anne Berkeley, a daughter of Maurice Berkeley, de jure 3rd Baron Berkeley (1436–1506). Katherine was the sister of the courtiers Sir Walter Denys of Dyrham and of Sir Maurice Denys of Siston, Gloucestershire.

On 24 November 1546 Christopher Mont wrote to Buckler saying that he supposed him 'now married with an honest wife', and on 8 December 1546 Buckler conveyed properties to his future brothers-in-law Sir Walter Denys and Maurice Denys as feoffees to his use 'until the celebration of his intended marriage with Katharine Tame, widow of Sir Edmund Tame, deceased, and after that to the use of him and his said wife in survivorship'. The marriage was childless and Walter Buckler's heir was his nephew, Richard Buckler, second son of his brother John. After Walter Buckler's death, his widow, Katherine, married Roger Lygon (d.1584), esquire. The effigies of Katherine and Roger Lygon lie side by side in Fairford Church. She was still living on 12 September 1575, when she wrote to Lord Burghley on behalf of 'Andrew Buckler, Comptroller of the Port of Poole, a nephew of her late husband, Sir Walter Buckler'. She is said to have died in 1582.

== Death and burial ==
Confusion concerning the date of Buckler's death has arisen from the claim in Wood's Fasti that he was appointed to Queen Elizabeth I's Privy Council at her accession in November 1558. However, there is documentary evidence that Buckler had died before Queen Elizabeth came to the throne, and that his wife, Katherine Denys, had remarried to Roger Lygon by 1554. On 26 October 1554 Queen Mary I and King Philip granted to Roger Lygon and 'Katherine Buckler, late wife of Walter Buckler, deceased', the manor of Cheltenham, and in 1557 Katherine and Roger Lygon were co-purchasers of a lease of the manor of Coln Rogers. Buckler died apparently at Fairford, Gloucestershire, the manor inherited by his wife from her first husband Edmund II Tame and was buried in the parish church of St Mary the Virgin, built by the Tame family.
