= William Denys =

Courtier of King Henry VIII and High Sheriff of Gloucestershire (c. 1470–1533)

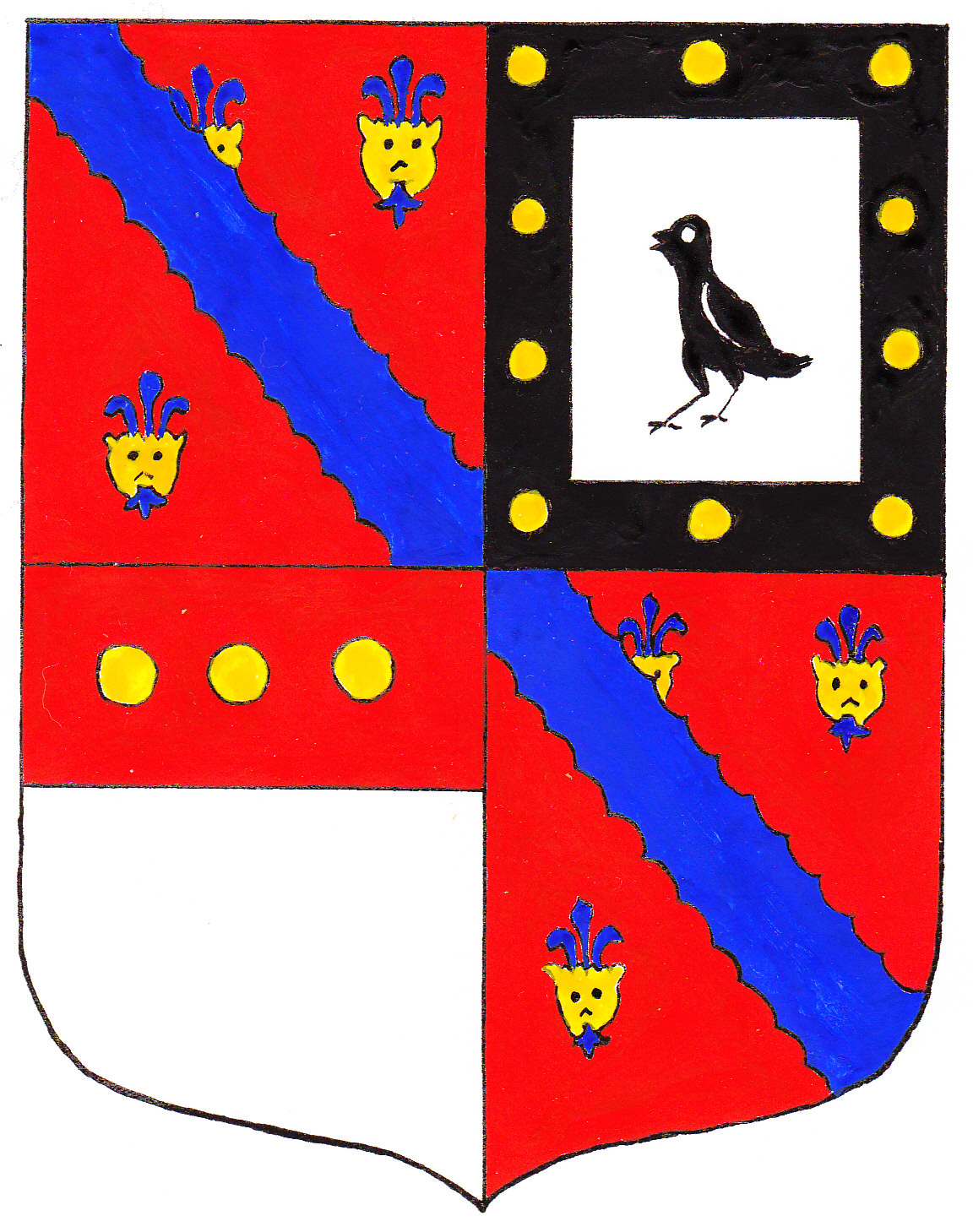
Arms of Sir William Denys (died 1533) of Dyrham, Gloucestershire: Quarterly, 1st & 4th: Gules, 3 leopard's faces or jessant-de-lys azure over all a bend engrailled of the last (Denys), 2nd: Argent, a raven proper a bordure sable bezantee (Corbet of Siston), 3rd: Argent, on a chief gules 3 bezants (Russell of Dyrham) BL Cott. MS Claudius ciii, f.97b

Sir William Denys (c. 1470–1533) of Dyrham, Gloucestershire, was a courtier of King Henry VIII and High Sheriff of Gloucestershire in 1518 and 1526. The surname is sometimes transcribed as Dennis.

== Origins ==
He was the eldest son and heir of Sir Walter Denys (d. 1505) of Siston in Gloucestershire, by his 2nd wife Agnes Danvers, 2nd daughter & co-heiress of Sir Robert Danvers (died 1467) of Epwell, Oxfordshire, Chief Justice of the Common Pleas (1450–1467). The Inquisition post mortem of his father Sir Walter, dated 1505, states William his son and heir to have then been "aged 35 years and more", which suggests a date of birth of 1470.

== First marriage ==
In about 1481 William's father arranged for him to marry Edith Twynyho, daughter of the wealthy Cirencester lawyer and cloth-merchant John Twynyho (1440–1485), whose monumental brass survives over his tomb in the south aisle of Lechlade Church, Glos. Twynyho served as MP for Bristol in 1472–1475 and again in 1484 and had been Attorney General to Lord Edward, 1st son of King Edward IV, in 1478. Twynyho had gone into partnership with John Tame (died 1500), the builder of Fairford Church, Glos., and a favourite of King Henry VII, and the pair had expanded their sheep, wool and cloth business in a bold fashion by acquiring large amounts of sheep rearing land, including Fairford in 1479. Indeed Twynyho's daughter Alice (died 1471) was given by her father as wife to John Tame, and the monumental brass of the couple can be seen on top of their chest tomb, known as "the Founder's Tomb", at Fairford Church. Twynyho's relative Ankaret Twynho (née Hawkeston) had been a servant of Isabel Neville, Duchess of Clarence (died 1476), daughter and co-heiress of Richard Nevill, Earl of Warwick (died 1471), whose death in childbirth had been blamed, by her husband George Plantagenet, 1st Duke of Clarence (executed 1478), on poisoning by Ankaret.

Clarence was determined to have Ankaret executed, against the wishes of the Queen, who believed her to be an elderly and harmless widow blamed unjustly. Clarence rapidly gave orders for her arrest, which was performed at Keyford, Frome, Somerset, the family home, on 12 April 1477, by Richard Hyde and Roger Strugge and 80 "riotous persons", whence she was taken to Bath, thence to Cirencester thence to Warwick, where she was tried before JPs at the guildhall and found guilty by a jury. She was hanged at Mytton, Warks., on 15 April 1477, which action is considered by modern historians as a notorious judicial murder. Clarence himself was executed in the Tower of London the following year, 18 February 1478, and two days later, on 20 February 1478, Ankaret's grandson, Roger Twynyho, obtained the king's annulment of Ankaret's conviction.

It appears the Denys/Twynyho relationship may have started in 1481 on the sale or other transfer by Sir Walter Denys of the manors, or an interest therein, of North Cheriton and South Cheriton, Somerset, to the Twynyho/Tame wool-merchant partnership, which manors had been inherited from Sir Walter's grandmother Margaret Russell, daughter of Sir Maurice Russell (died 1416) of Dyrham. The following entry in the Somerset Feet of Fines records the transaction:

At Westminster in the quinzaine of St. Hillary between Cristofor Twynyho cleric, John Twynyho of Cirencestre esquire, William Twynyho of Shipton Solers esquire, John Tame of Fayreford esquire, Edmund Langeley of Sudyngton Langeley esquire, Thomas Delalynde of Clencheston esquire, John Walshe of Olveston esquire, William Lovell of Raffeston esquire, and Thomas Warner of Cirencestre esquire querents; and Walter Denys esquire and Agnes his wife deforciants; for the manor of Northcheryton and the advowson of the free chapel of South-cheryton (and lands in Glouc. and Dors.). Walter and Agnes acknowledged the right of John Twynyho as by their gift and quit claimed for the heirs of Agnes, and they warranted against Richard abbot of the monastery of St Mary Cirencestre and his successors; for this John Twynyho gave them six hundred pounds sterling.

- Christopher Twynyho was steward of Shaftesbury Abbey, Dorset, of which his sister Margery was Abbess (1496–1505). Shaftesbury was the second wealthiest Abbey in the land, behind only Glastonbury Abbey. The will of John Twynyho (died 1485) bequeaths to this "Dame Margery, my niece, nun of Shaftesbury" a silver & gilt goblet "which had been presented to him by George, Duke of Clarence". This familiarity with the Duke suggests that John was the son or grandson of Ankaret.
- William Twynyho (died 1497) of Shipton Solers, Glos., was the 2nd son of William Twynyho of Keyford and served as MP for Weymouth 1472–1475 had acquired that manor in right of his wife Catherine Solers (died 1494), daughter of John Solers. The manor descended to his son Walter Twynyho.
- Edmund Langley of Siddington, Gloucestershire, about 1 mile south of Cirencester was the husband of Lady Elizabeth Beynham (died 1527/28), widow of Sir Alexander Beynham of Mitcheldean, Forest of Dean, son of Sir Thomas Baynham and Alice Walwyn. Alice Walwyn, as widow of Sir Thomas, was the 4th and last wife of Sir Walter Denys (died 1505). Edmund Langley's will was dated 1490.
- Thomas Delalynde of Winterborne Clenston, Dorset, was married to Edith Twynyho, daughter of William Twynyho (died 1472) of Keyford, Frome, Somerset, by Ankaret. He was living at Warwick, presumably as part of the retinue of Isabel, Duchess of Clarence, and the couple were summarily ordered to leave Warwick by order of the Duke of Clarence during the trial of Ankaret, as the petition to the king made by Roger, Ankaret's grandson, reveals.
- John Walshe (died c. 1492) of Olveston, and Little Sodbury Glos., appears to have acquired Olveston in 1472 from Sir Walter Denys, father of William, who is buried in the middle of the choir of Olveston Church, as the Denys monumental brass there states. In 1490 Walshe was appointed King's Receiver of the estates of William, Marquess Berkeley, uncle of Anne Berkeley, Sir William Denys's 2nd. wife, when he alienated his estates to King Henry VII. His son, John II Walshe, was King's Champion at the coronation of Henry VIII, and was a great favourite of the young king's. John I Walshe's daughter Catherine married George Huntley (died 1580) of Frocester, MP for Cricklade, eldest son of John Huntley of Standish by Alice Langley, daughter of Edmund Langley of Siddington.

George Huntley's brother John married Jane Carne, daughter of Sir Edward Carne (died 1561), husband of Anne Denys, daughter of Sir William Denys.

== Marriage settlement ==
The marriage settlement appears to have concerned the Denys manors of Aust, Gloucestershire, of which they held a moiety, and Litton Cheney in Dorset.

=== Litton Cheyne ===
The Inquisition post mortem of William's father Sir Walter Denys, dated 18 October 1505, relating to his lands in Dorset, states as follows:

"He was formerly seized in fee of the under-mentioned moiety of the manor of Lutton, with the advowson, and by charter dated the eve of St. Thomas the Apostle, 21 Edward IV (i.e. 1481), gave it to Master Christopher Twynyho, clerk, John Twynyho, William Twynyho, John Walsshe, Thomas de la Lynde, William Lovell and Thomas Warner, esquires, to hold to them and their heirs to the use of William Denys, then his son and heir apparent, and of Edith, William's wife, and of the heirs of their bodies, and in default of such issue to the use of the said William Denys and his heirs; by pretext whereof the said Christopher and his co-feoffees were seized thereof to the use aforesaid in the form aforesaid".

The feoffees to this arrangement are the same as those who acted in the previously quoted transfer at about the same time of Cherington by Sir Walter Denys.

=== Aust ===
The marriage settlement appears to have concerned the Denys manor of Aust, Glos., as recorded in a charter dated 21 Edward IV (1481), incompletely quoted and preserved in the Gloucestershire Inquisition post mortem of Sir Walter Denys, dated 14 September 1505 :

He was seized of a moiety of the manor of Awste or Aust, and by charter dated... 21 Edward IV, ...enfeoffed thereof...Twynyho, William Twynyho, John Thame, Edmund Langley...to hold to the use of William Denys, then his son and heir apparent, and of Edith, William's wife, and of the heirs of their bodies, and in default of such issue to the use of the said William Denys and his heirs; by pretext whereof the said Christopher Twynyho and his co-feoffees were seized thereof in form aforesaid.

A daughter named Anne was born from the marriage with Edith Twynyho, who died sine prole.

== Career ==
=== Esquire of the Body ===
It may have been due to the position of William's half-uncle Hugh Denys (died 1511), Groom of the Stool to King Henry VII (died 1509), that he was appointed at some date before 5 June 1511 an Esquire for the Body to the new young King Henry VIII. Hugh had occupied the closest position to the king of all the courtiers, and was highly trusted by the old king. The new King, Henry's son, had not continued Hugh Denys in his post of Groom of the Stool, which was one of considerable personal intimacy, having appointed his own favourite Sir William Compton (died 1528), but perhaps out of respect, and indeed affection, for his father's loyal old servant had kept him on as a standard Esquire of the Body for the first 2 years of his reign until Hugh's death in 1511. It was perhaps as a replacement for old Hugh that the king appointed his half-nephew William Denys in his place.

=== Awarded licence to empark ===
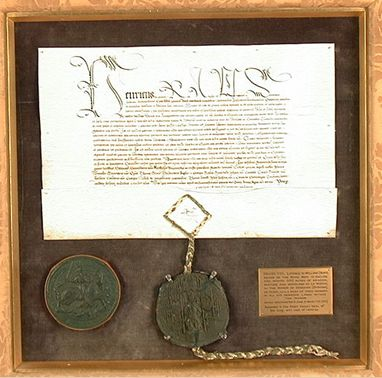
Royal licence to empark Dyrham granted by King Henry VIII to William Denys, Esquire of the Body, 5 June 1511. Affixed thereto is a rare perfect example of the Great Seal of Henry VIII. Collection of Dyrham Park, National Trust

At about the time of William's appointment as an Esquire of the Body the King granted him the honour of the licence to empark 500 acres of Dyrham, which is to say to enclose the land with a wall or hedgebank and to establish a captive herd of deer within, with exclusive hunting rights. This grant is witnessed by a charter on parchment, to which is affixed a rare example of a perfect great seal of Henry VIII, now hanging in a frame at Dyrham Park. It clearly was handed down with the deeds of the manor on the termination of the Denys era at Dyrham in 1571. The charter is of exceptional interest as it is witnessed by men of the greatest importance in the state, who were at the King's side at that moment, at the Palace of Westminster. The text of the document, translated from Latin is as follows:

"Henry by the grace of God King of England and France and Lord of Ireland sends greetings to his archbishops, bishops, abbotts, priors, dukes, marquises, earls, barons, judges, sheriffs, reeves, ministers and all our bailiffs and faithful subjects. Let it be known that we, motivated by our especial grace and certain knowledge of him, have granted for us and our heirs to our faithful servant William Denys, Esquire of the Royal Body, to him, his heirs and assigns, the right to empark 500 acres of land, meadow, pasture and wood together with appurtenance at Le Worthy within the manor of Dereham in the county of Gloucestershire and enclose them with fences and hedges in order to make a park there. Also that they may have free warren in all their demesne lands within the said manor. No other person may enter this park or warren to hunt or catch anything which might belong to that park or warren without permission from William, his heirs or assigns under penalty of £10, provided that the land is not within our forest.
Witnessed by:

- The most reverend in Christ father William Canterbury our chancellor and archbishop (William Warham)
- The reverend in Christ fathers Richard Winchester, Keeper of the Privy Purse (Richard Foxe) and
- Thomas Durham, our secretary (Thomas Ruthall), bishops.
- Thomas Surrey, Treasurer of England ( Thomas Howard, 2nd Duke of Norfolk) and
- George Shrewsbury (George Talbot, 4th Earl of Shrewsbury), steward of our household, earls.
- Charles Somerset Lord Herbert (Charles Somerset, 1st Earl of Worcester), our chamberlain and
- George Neville of Abergavenny (George Nevill, 5th Baron Bergavenny), barons.
- Thomas Lovell, treasurer of our household and
- Edward Poynings, comptroller of our household, knights, and many others.

Given by our hand at Westminster on the 5th day of June in the 3rd year of our reign" (1511).

From the size of the present park it appears that only about 250 acres were ultimately enclosed.

=== High Sheriff ===
Sir William served as High Sheriff of Gloucestershire in 1518 and 1526, continuing the tradition of the Denys family which would hold that post on more occasions than any other family.

== Second marriage ==
William married 2ndly in about 1508 Anne Berkeley, daughter of Maurice Berkeley (died 1506), de jure 3rd Baron Berkeley, from the leading Gloucestershire family. This marriage accorded to William a considerable status in the county gentry. The marriage took place about two years after the death of Anne's father, so it appears the marriage was arranged between William and Anne's brother Maurice Berkeley (died 1526), de jure 4th Baron Berkeley. Since 1492 the Berkeleys had been dispossessed of their ancestral lands including Berkeley Castle, following the death of William Berkeley (died 1492), 1st Marquis Berkeley, Anne's uncle, who had bequeathed all his paternal lands to King Henry VII and his heirs male, either in exchange for his new marquessate or because he disapproved of his brother Maurice having married beneath the nobility to Isabel Mead, the daughter of Philip Meade, alderman & mayor of Bristol. Anne's father Maurice, during this Berkeley exile, had therefore been living at Thornbury, close to the Denys manors of Alveston and Earthcott Green. It may have been from this proximity that the marriage was proposed.

=== Marriage settlement ===
The Inquisition post mortem of Sir William Denys, taken at Marshfield on 7 January 1534/5 makes reference to the marriage settlement, and details the manors which William settled on Anne's feoffees at that time:

“The jurors say that he held no lands of the king in the county of Gloucester, but that some time before his death he was seized of the manor of Alveston, of the manor of Erdecote (i.e. Earthcott Green) also of the park of Alveston, together with the hundred of Langley in his demesne as of fee. And so being seized by charter dated 12th September 1508 confirmed a grant to Maurice Berkeley & others of the said manors. They further say that he was seized of the manor of Dyrham with the advowson of the church, also 3 messuages, 200 acres of land, 20 acres of meadow, 40 acres of pasture in Henton (i.e. Hinton) in his demesne as of fee. And by charter dated 22nd September 1508 he granted the same to Maurice Berkeley & others. The jurors also say that John FitzJames, knight & Edward Wadham, knight, in 24 Henry VIII (1532) together with Maurice Berkeley & others received against the said William Denys the manior of Siston with the advowson of the church, a moiety of the manor of Aust & 22 messuages etc. and one pound of pepper in Siston and Westrete in the hundred of Barton, near Bristol. Which recovery of the said manor of Ciston (sic) is to the use of the said William & Anne his wife and of their heirs male. And the moiety of the manor of Aust etc., to the said Anne for life.”

John FitzJames was Lord Chief Justice of the King's Bench and had married (as her 2nd husband) Elizabeth Coningsby, mother of Denys's son-in-law Sir John Berkeley (died 1546) of Stoke Gifford.

== Attends Field of Cloth of Gold ==
In June 1520 Denys was one of the 7 knights of the Gloucestershire contingent selected to form part of the 100 or so nobles and gentlemen appointed to attend King Henry VIII at the Field of the Cloth of Gold, near Calais, where the King was to meet King Francis I of France. Each knight was expected to bring his own retinue, but limited to 10 persons and 4 horses. Edmund Tame (died 1534), the son of the business partner of John Twynho, Denys's first father-in-law, was also on the Gloucestershire list, but his name was subsequently struck out and replaced, possibly due to ill-health. In a subsequent record Denys's name is shown as erased from the list of those attending the King, with the words "With the Queen" added, suggesting he had been transferred into the retinue of Katharine of Aragon.

== Founds Guild of St Denis ==
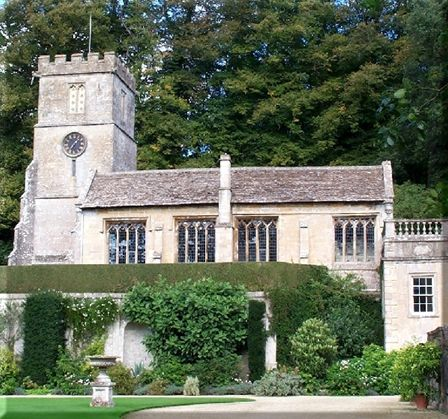
St Peter's Church, Dyrham

In 1520 Sir William and Lady Ann founded the "Guild of St. Denis" in the Church of St Peter, Dyrham, next to their manor house. The early English guild performed the service to the general community and the poor and needy which is today performed by government-funded social security, but had a religious element in addition. This later guild at Dyrham appears however to have been more akin to a chantry, endowed with revenues to fund the singing by priests of masses for the souls of the members. The records of the guild are held by Bristol Archives, and it is recorded that "Many were the brethren and Sisters of this Guild who were prevailed upon to contribute towards its maintenance; which persons lived in fifty several parishes at least, in Bristol, Bath, Somerset and Gloucestershire, and might amount to three hundred persons". The endowments of the guild consisted mainly of livestock which were let out to local farmers for a yearly rental. The fate of the chantry at the Dissolution of the Monasteries is not recorded, possibly because it seems not to have held any endowments in the form of land. It is likely that the Patron Saint Denis was selected due to his having the same name as the Denys family, yet the family itself was probably so named not after the saint, but due to its probable Danish origins. In ancient charters the name is latinised as Dacus being the adjectival form of Dacia, mediaeval Latin for "Denmark". In Norman French it is given as Le Deneis, i.e. "The Dane". There were three prominent mediaeval Denys families in the South-West, one from Ilchester, Somerset, one from Devon, and that from Glamorgan which in about 1380 came to Siston and then to Dyrham in Gloucestershire, in the person of Sir Gilbert Denys (died 1422), great-grandfather of Sir William Denys. The three families may all have originated from a common root before the era of the mass adoption of arms, that is to say the first half of the 13th century. The Somerset branch was the most short-lived, having disappeared before it might have adopted arms, but the Devon Denys's adopted as their arms three Danish battle-axes, the favoured weapons of the Vikings, as borne by the King of Denmark and recorded as used by him in the Camden rolls of arms, c. 1280.

== Progeny ==
By his first marriage to Edith Twynyho Was produced one daughter:

- Anne, died without issue

By his second marriage to Anne Berkeley were produced numerous children:

=== Sons ===
- (1) Sir Walter (died 1571), eldest son & heir.
- (2) Sir Maurice Denys (died 1563), Treasurer of Calais & builder of Siston Court.
- (3) William II Denys (died post-1571). He was bequeathed by the will of his eldest brother Sir Walter his "velvett gowne and velvett jackett". After the Dissolution of the Monasteries he was granted by letters patent dated 22 June 1 Edward VI (1548) a 60-year lease of the Chantry of St Michael in the parish church of Winterbourne, Glos. (between Siston & Alveston), which had been founded by Thomas Bradston. The chantry held lands in Winterbourne, Framshaw, Hambroke, Churchefelde & Cliffelde, all in Glos., from which it received rents. By 1553 William had disposed of it to Robert Bradston of Winterbourne, who used it as security for a loan of £40 from John Smyth, a merchant of Bristol. A contemporary report on the chantry related as follows:

"In the deanerie of Bristowe (i.e. Bristol) the parish of Wynterborne where are howselinge people (i.e. communicants) ccii. The warden of Wynterborne or otherwise called Bradston Chantrie "md?” that the seid wardenage or chantrie with the whole possessions thereunto belonging or appertaining have been for the space of one whole yere past or ther about in the possession of one William Denys now occupying the same by what title they know not, who said unto them he hath the same of our sovereign lord the king's majestie".

The Catalogue of Seals in the British Museum records the following entry:

"Bradston Chantry in Winterbourne, co. Glos. A doubtful seal. Oval, a leopard's head jessant-de-lys. Motto: “..ATA TRAHUNT"

This appears to be one of the leopards on the Denys arms. The motto may have been from Ovid, Aeneid, Book 5, line 709: Quo fata trahunt, (retrahuntque, sequamur)("Whither the Fates draw (us) (and draw us back, let us follow"))

- (4) Thomas
- (5) Francis, probably named after the French king Francois I whom William had attended his king to in 1520 at the Field of the Cloth of Gold.
- (6) John

=== Daughters ===
- Anne, married 1stly John Raglan, 2ndly Sir Edward Carne (died 1561). She had issue from the 2nd marriage.

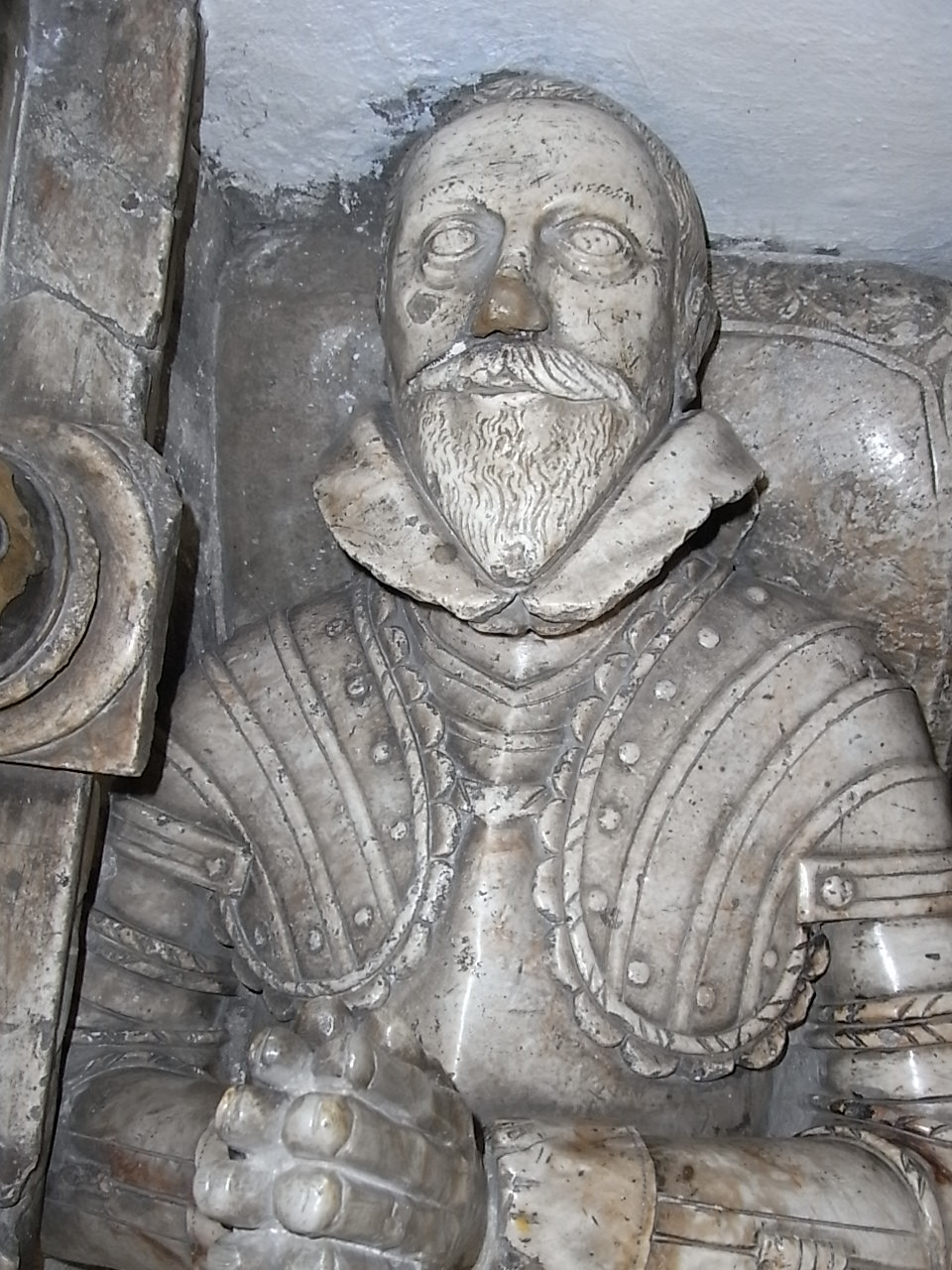
Effigy of Sir Richard Berkeley(died 1604) of Stoke Gifford, eldest son of Isabel Denys, in The Gaunts Chapel, Bristol

- Isabel, married 1stly Sir John Berkeley (died 1546) of Stoke Gifford, Glos., who died of splinter wounds whilst on board ship at Portsmouth, eldest son of Sir Richard Berkeley (died 1514) by Elizabeth Conningsby. The couple's eldest son was Sir Richard Berkeley (died 1604), MP for Gloucestershire, whose effigy can be seen in The Gaunts Chapel, Bristol. Also 2 daughters: Elizabeth Dennis Berkeley, born 1530, married Henry Lygon; Mary Berkeley, married Nicholas Walshe. Isabel survived her first husband and married 2ndly Arthur Porter (c. 1505 – 1559) of Newent and Alvington, MP for Gloucestershire in November 1554, for the City of Gloucester in 1555 and for Aylesbury in 1559.

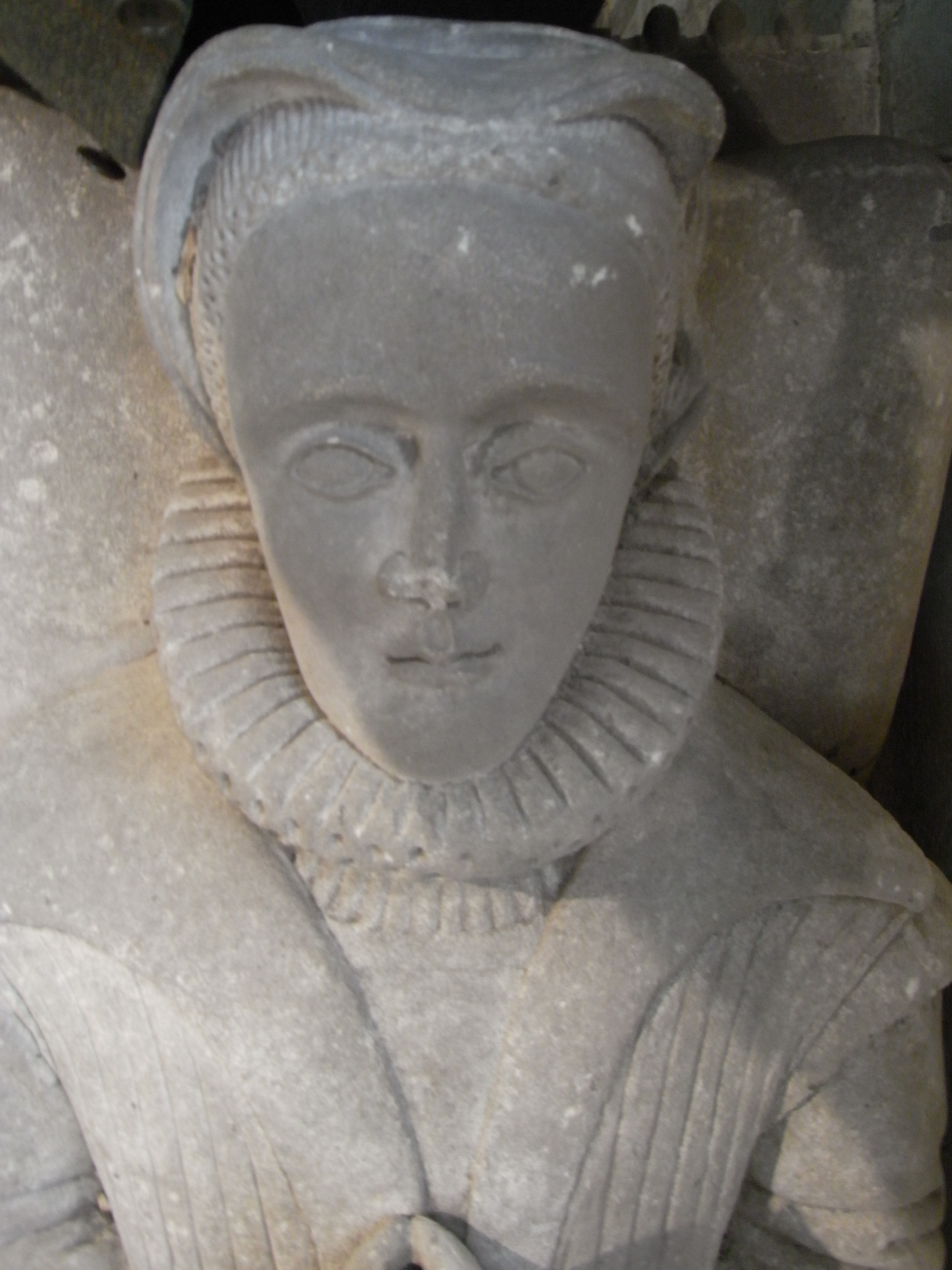
Effigy of Katherine Denys, Fairford, Glos. She lies next to an effigy of her 3rd. & last husband, Roger Lygon

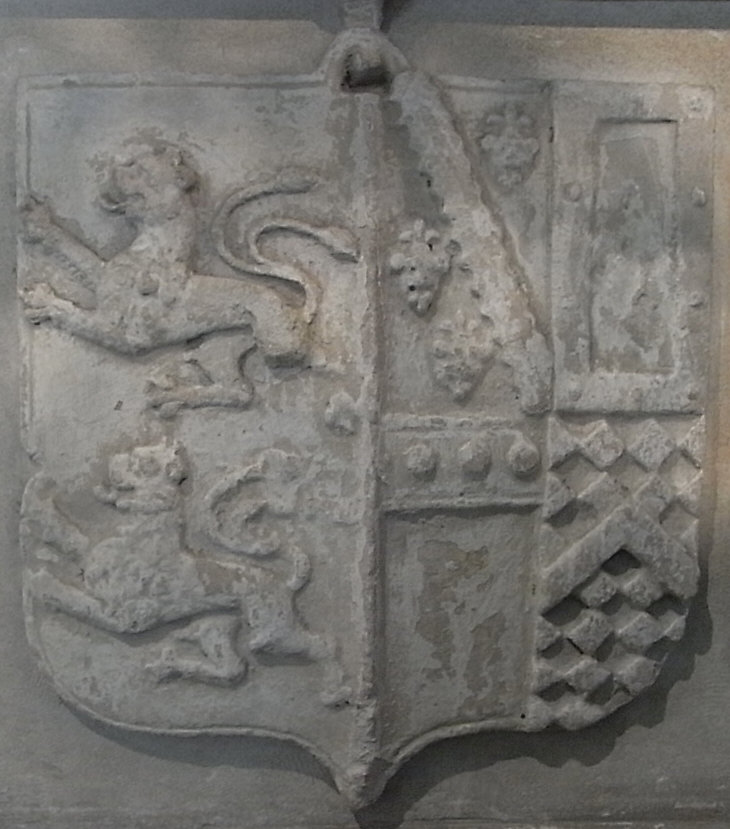
Heraldic escutcheon on tomb of Roger Lygon & Katherine Denys (died 1560) in Fairford Church, Glos. Lygon impaling Denys: Dexter: Lygon: Argent, two lions passant in pale tails fourchee gules Sinister: Denys: Quarterly: 1. Gules, 3 leopard's faces or jessant-de-lys azure over all a bend engrailled azure (Denys) Here the leopard's faces are arranged incorrectly, for better artistic effect.; 2. Argent, a raven proper within a bordure sable bezantee (Corbet); 3. Argent, on a chief gules 3 bezants (Russell); 4. Lozengy or & azure, a bend gules (Gorges). These arms resulted from the famous heraldic law-suit of Warbelton v. Gorges.

- Katherine (died 1560), married 1stly, on 15 September 13 Henry VIII (1521), Sir Edmund II Tame (died 1544) of Fairford. 2ndly Walter Bucler, secretary to Queen Katherine Parr. 3rdly Roger Lygon (died without issue 1584), 8th son of Richard Lygon by Anne Beauchamp, 2nd daughter & co-heiress of Baron Beauchamp of Powyke. He was a Gentleman Usher to Queen Mary I. From her 1st marriage she inherited a life interest in the considerable Tame lands, including the manor of Fairford, Glos., in the parish church of which she is buried with her last husband in a chest-tomb with sculpted portrait effigies above.
- Eleanor, married William Lygon of Madresfield, son of Richard Lygon (eldest son of Richard Lygon & Anne Beauchamp) by Margaret Greville, founders of the prominent early American colonial family of "Ligon" of Virginia, ancestors of actress Courteney Cox. Eleanor was also the grandmother of Sir Ferdinando Gorges, founder of the American province of Maine, whose mother was Cicely Lygon.
- Bridget
- Mary, described in the 1623 Visitation of Gloucestershire as "a nun at Lacok", was in fact the last prioress of Kington St. Michael Priory, Wiltshire, having started as a young nun at Lacock Abbey. In the summer of 1535 the King's visitors for effecting dissolution came to Lacock and made a favourable report. John ap Rice wrote that he had "founde no notable compertes there" and commended the nuns of Lacock for their familiarity with their rule and constitutions. He informed Thomas Cromwell that Dame Marie Denys, 'a faire young woman of Laycock', had been made Prioress of Kington, where the visitation had revealed a less satisfactory state of affairs. She lived to ripe old age, having outlived her eldest brother Sir Walter (died 1571), who bequeathed to her in his will his "second best bed at Codrington". She died in 1593 and received the honour of burial at the Gaunt's Chapel, Bristol.
- Margaret, married on 19 June 21 Henry VIII (1529) Sir Nicholas Arnold, the highly influential Tudor politician, Lord Deputy of Ireland, who played a central role under Thomas Cromwell in administering the Dissolution of the Monasteries. Her uncle, Thomas, 5th Baron Berkeley (died 1533) gave her in his will 200 marks for her marriage

== Sources ==
- Davis, Cecil T., Monumental Brasses of Gloucestershire, London, 1899, p. 109, Re brass of John Twynyho at Lechlade.
- Maclean, Sir John, (ed.), Visitation of the County of Gloucester Taken in the Year 1623 by Henry Chitty, London, 1885. ("Dennis" pp. 49–53)
- Robinson, W.J., West Country Manors, Bristol, 1930. (Dyrham, pp. 73–76; Syston(sic), pp. 169–172)
