= Kington St. Michael Priory =

Benedictine nunnery in Wiltshire, England

Coordinates: 51°29′57″N 2°09′18″W

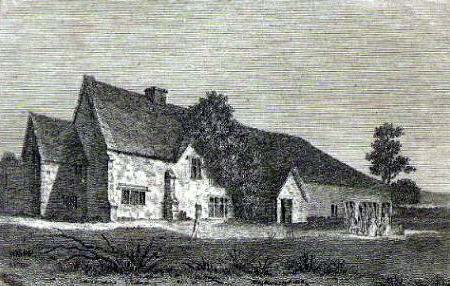
Kington St. Michael Priory in 1803. Sketch from The Gentleman Magazine, 1803. Artist unknown, possibly John Britton

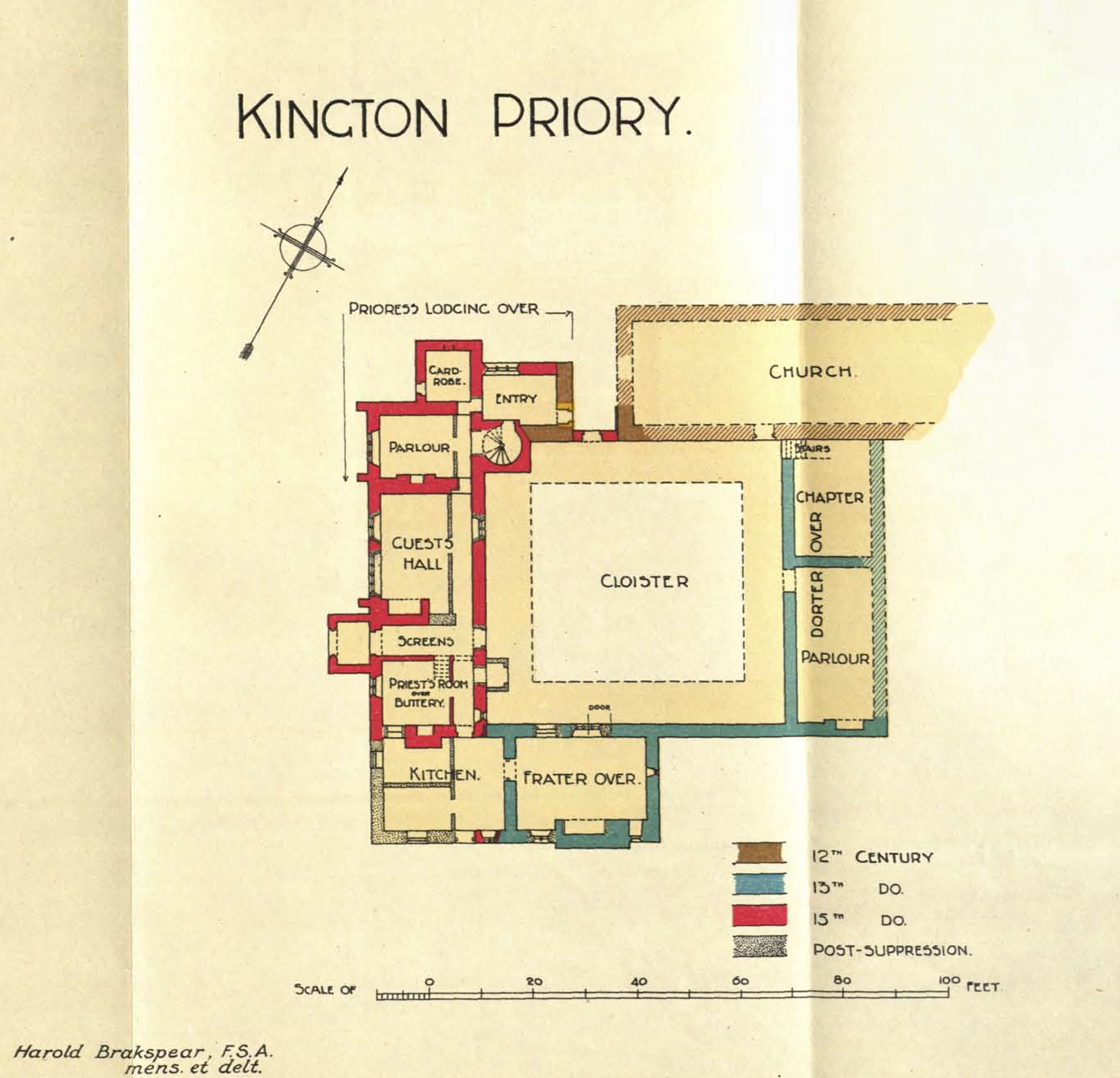
Ground plan of the priory, from Brakspear (1923)

St Mary's Priory was a Benedictine priory of nuns at Kington St Michael in Wiltshire, England. Founded before 1155, the priory was dissolved in 1536.

Parts of the priory buildings from the 13th and 15th centuries were incorporated into the present Priory Farm, where there is also modern rebuilding on old foundations.

The last Prioress of Kington was Dame Marie Denys, a daughter of Sir William Denys (1470–1533) of Dyrham, Gloucestershire and Lady Ann Berkeley, da. of Maurice, de jure 3rd Baron Berkeley (d.1506). She had previously been a nun at Lacock Abbey, and had just taken up her new appointment at the start of the Dissolution of the Monasteries. In the summer of 1535 the King's visitors came to Lacock and made a favourable report. John ap Rice wrote that he had "founde no notable compertes there" and commended the nuns of Lacock for their familiarity with their rule and constitutions. He informed Thomas Cromwell that Dame Marie Denys, "a faire young woman of Laycock", had been made Prioress of Kington, where the visitation had revealed a less satisfactory state of affairs. The report of the Commissioners of 1536 upon Kington was, however, favourable.

Marie Denys lived until at least 1571, when she was bequeathed by the will of her brother Sir Walter Denys (1501–1571) his second best bed, situated at the home of his second wife at Codrington, near Dyrham: "Item I geve my second best bed with blanketts coverled, bolster thereunto belonginge being nowe in Codrington unto my sister Marye Denys".

== Sources ==
- "Wiltshire Victoria County History, 1956, vol 3 'Houses of Benedictine nuns: Priory of Kington St Michael', pp259–262". British History Online. University of London.
- "Wiltshire Victoria County History, 1956, vol 3 'Houses of Augustinian canonesses: Abbey of Lacock', pp303–316". British History Online. University of London.
- Jackson, J. E. (1857). "Kington St. Michael: St. Mary's Priory". Wiltshire Archaeological and Natural History Magazine. 4 (10): 51–71 – via Biodiversity Heritage Library.
