= Maurice Denys =

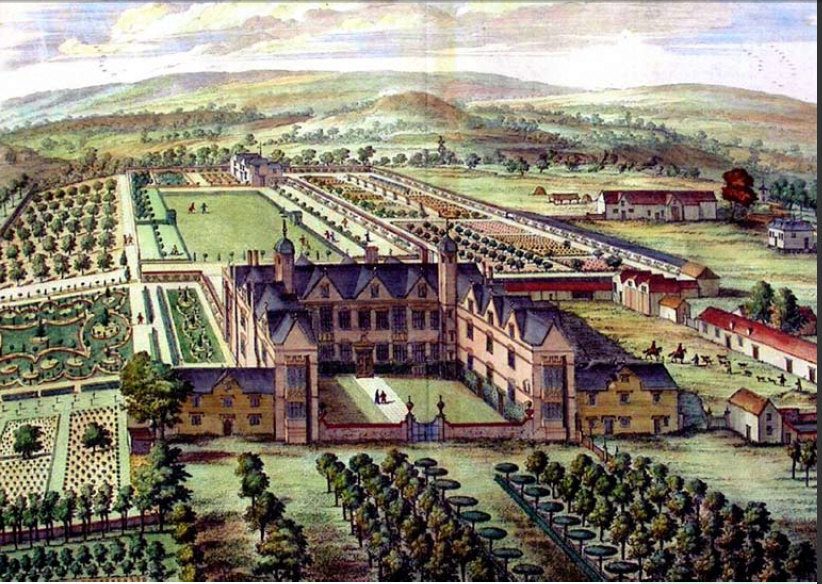
Siston Court, built by Sir Maurice Denys, 1712 illustration by Jan Kip

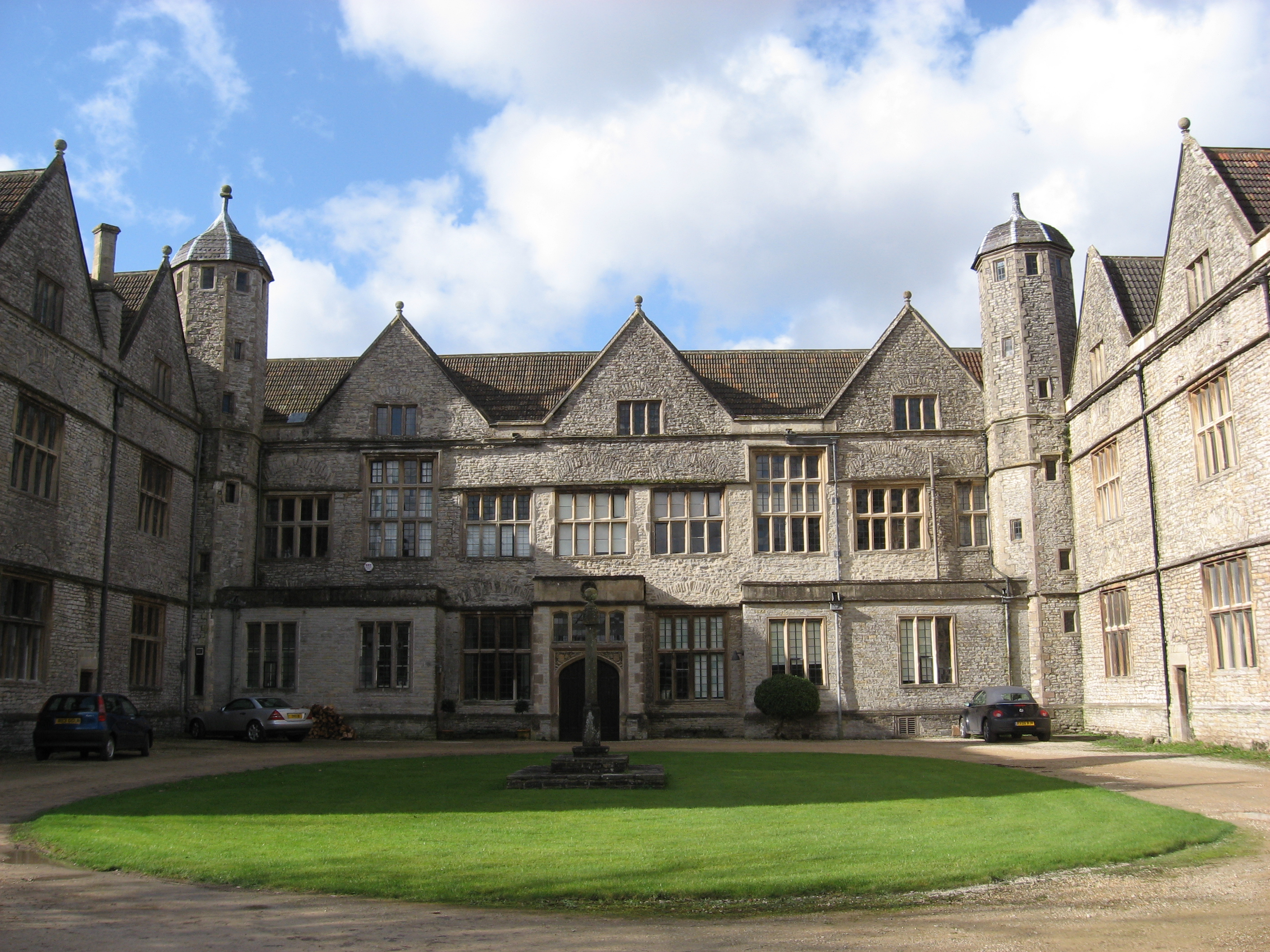
Siston Court in 2008, surviving largely as built by Sir Maurice Denys

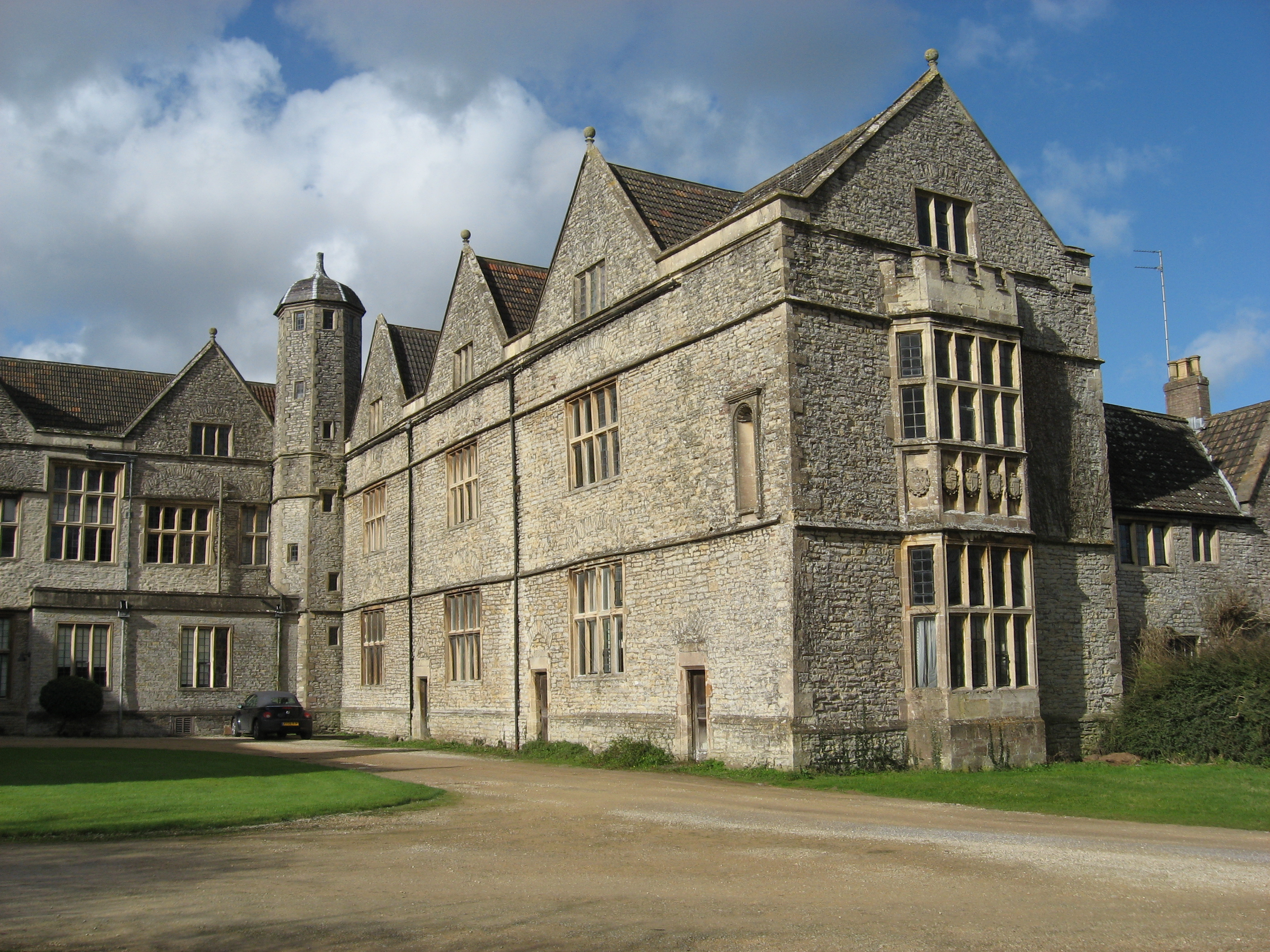
North wing of Siston Court, with heraldic shields (see below) on the bay windows showing the ancestry of Sir Maurice Denys, including the arms of Corbet of Siston, the heiress first wife of his ancestor Sir Gilbert Denys (d.1422)

Heraldic shields of the Denys family, north wing of Siston Court

Sir Maurice Denys (1516–1563) of Siston Court, near Bristol, Gloucestershire, and of St John's Street, Clerkenwell, Middlesex, was an English lawyer and property speculator during the Dissolution of the Monasteries, at which time he served as a "powerful figure at the Court of Augmentations". He served as a Member of Parliament for Malmesbury in Wiltshire and as Treasurer of Calais. He was the builder of Siston Court in Gloucestershire, which survives largely unaltered since his time. His excessive speculation and borrowing caused the ruination of the Siston branch of the Denys family.

== Early life ==
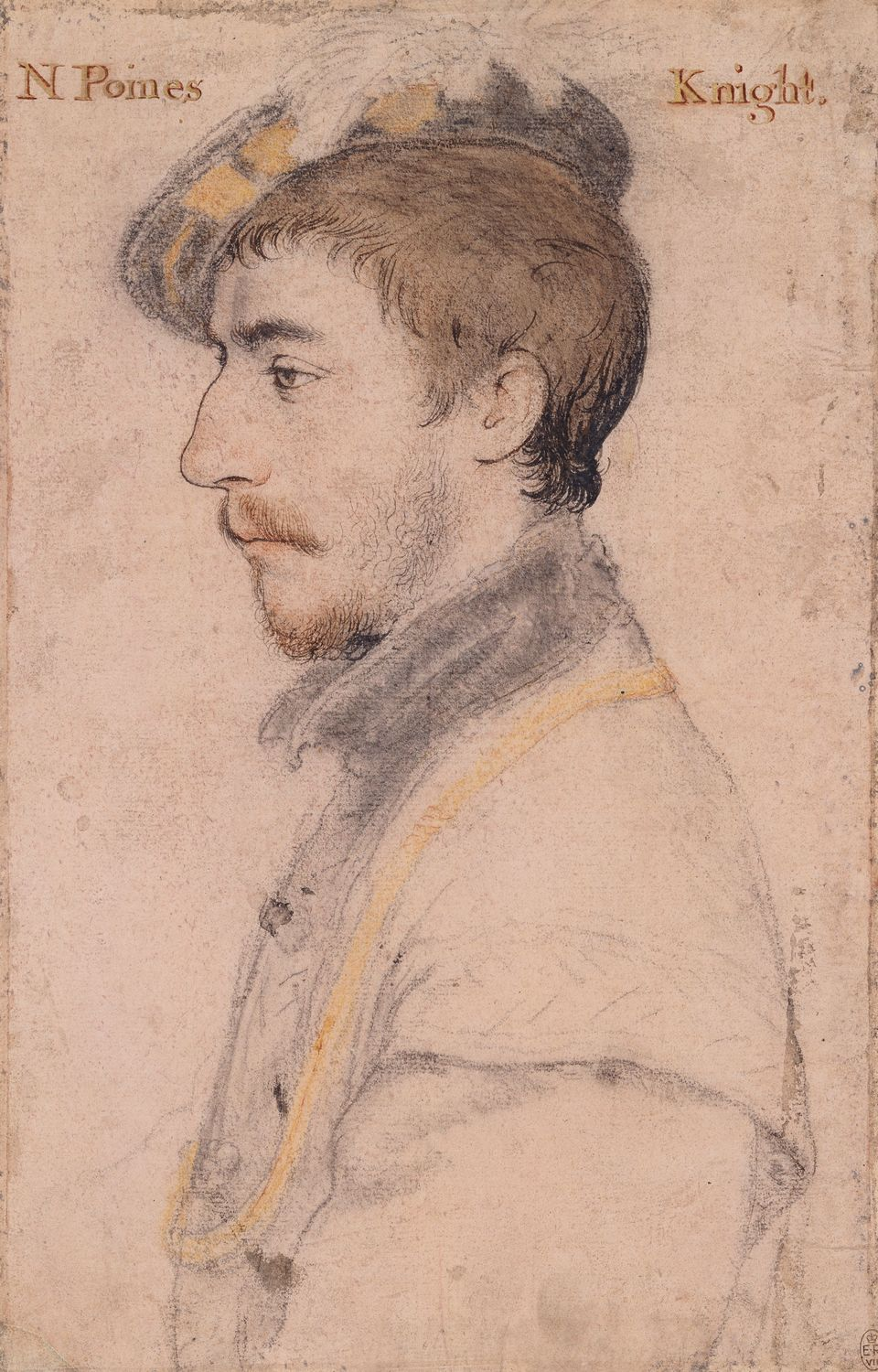
Sir Nicholas Poyntz, husband of Jane Berkeley, first cousin of Maurice Denys, in a drawing by Hans Holbein the Younger

Denys was the second son of Sir William Denys (died 1533) of Dyrham and Siston, both in Gloucestershire, a courtier of King Henry VIII, by his second wife Anne Berkeley, a daughter of Maurice Berkeley, de jure 3rd Baron Berkeley (1436–1506). His father’s first wife, whom he had married in about 1482 and who was short-lived, was Edith Twynyho, but she died young. His father was a great-grandson of Sir Gilbert Denys (died 1422) of Waterton, Glamorgan, who had settled in Gloucestershire following his first marriage in 1379 to Margaret Corbet, heiress of Siston and had later married Margaret Russell, heiress of Dyrham, from whom all his children were descended.

== Barrister ==
Denys entered the Inner Temple in London, where he trained as a barrister. He was appointed Marshal (1542–44, 1546), Steward (1545–46) and Bencher (1547).

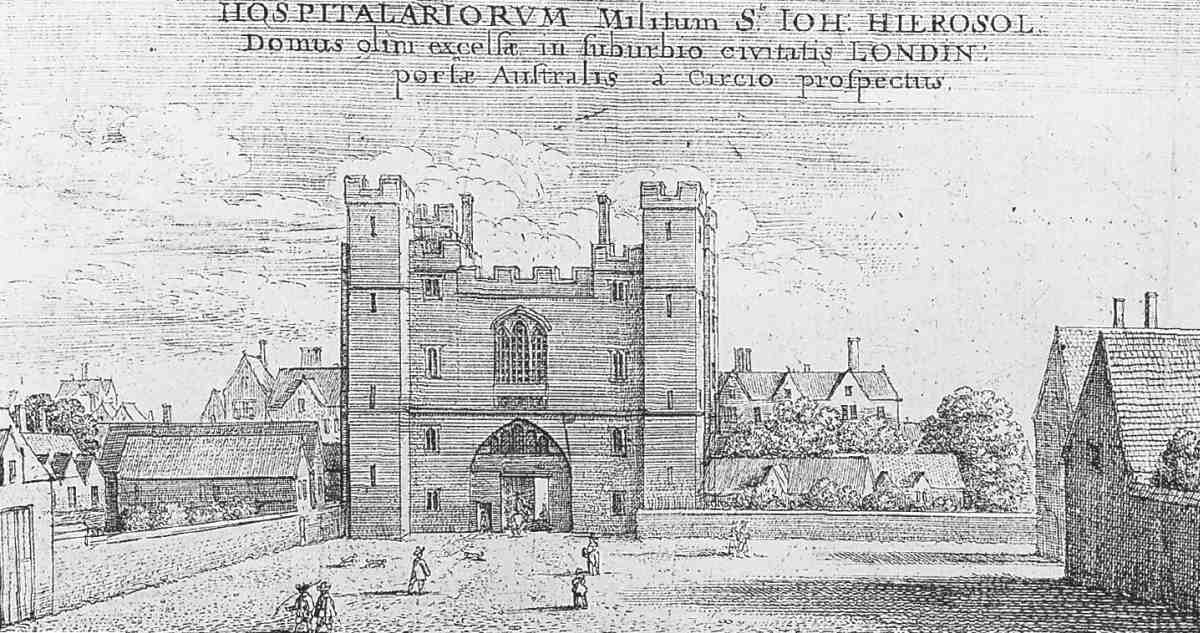
St John's Gate, Clerkenwell in 1661, by Wenceslaus Hollar

In 1537, King Henry VIII granted Denys the Receivership of the former Order of Saint John, suppressed in England during the Dissolution of the Monasteries. This considerable preferment may have been due to his eldest brother, Sir Walter Denys, having married Margaret Weston, a daughter of Sir Richard Weston, of Sutton Place, Surrey, the elder brother of Sir William Weston, the last Prior of the Order before its dissolution. Denys took up residence at St John's Gate, Clerkenwell, which had been the Order's headquarters, the chief residence there being the house by the Gate formerly occupied by Thomas Docwra, the last-but-one Prior. This had a great hall, a chapel, gardens and an orchard, and was later the residence of Lionel Cranfield, 1st Earl of Middlesex. Denys also resided at St John's Jerusalem, the Order’s former Commandery at Sutton-at-Hone in Kent. He continued as sole Receiver of the Order until 1544, and after that acted jointly with Thomas Poley.

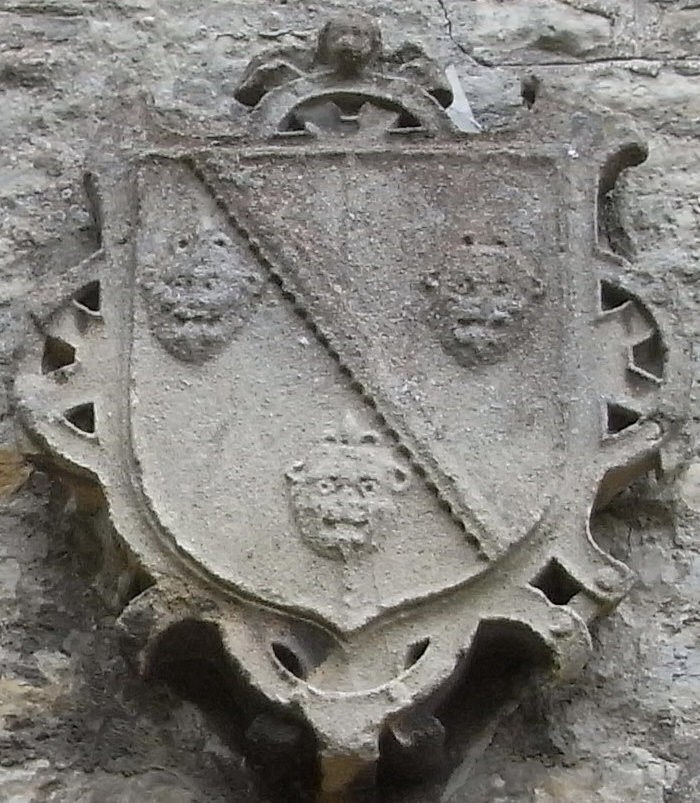
Arms of Denys, sculpted in stone on Siston Court

Denys later bought the ancestral Denys manor of Siston from his elder brother, Sir Walter, who had inherited it. This was perhaps in the year 1542, when his brother needed to obtain a Royal licence to sell him Kingston Russell, and one of the brothers went on to build a new country house there, known as Siston Court. The evidence for Sir Maurice being the builder comes from a letter dated 1607 to Robert Cecil, 1st Earl of Salisbury from an agent offering him the property for sale, which is summarised in the Cecil Papers:

"Offers for sale the manor of Siston Glos., 6 miles (9.7 km) from Bath & from Bristol, heretofore the land of Sir Morris Dennis, present owner Mr Weeks. There is a new house of stone which cost £3,000 built by Dennis; a park which will keep 1,000 fallow deer & rich mines of coal which yield almost as great revenue as the land".

Siston was built at about the same time as two of Denys’s connections were also building nearby in Gloucestershire: Sir Nicholas Poyntz, the husband of his first cousin Jane Berkeley, at Newark Park near Wotton-Under-Edge, and Sir Richard Berkeley, his nephew at Stoke Park, Stoke Gifford. Denys borrowed heavily to buy not just Siston, but also other nearby estates, including Barton Regis, a former Royal manor in Kingswood Forest, a large part of the Forest itself, and Abson and Pucklechurch from the Earl of Pembroke, who had obtained Pucklechurch at the Dissolution, as well as other manors in Gloucestershire and other counties.

== Marriage ==
On 3 February 1545, Denys married Elizabeth Statham (died 1572), the widow of Nicholas Statham (died 1538), a member of the Worshipful Company of Mercers. Her family name is not known. Statham had been admitted to the Mercers' Company in 1512 as an apprentice of Robert Imber. He served as one of the four wardens of the company in 1532, as Second House Warden. In 1535 he is recorded as having shipped, together with his son-in-law Vincent Randall, 349 Kerseys to Sinxen Mart as part of a company of 114 cloth shippers. His will dated 1538 was "sparse" and "suggests a sombre support of the new ways" according to Anne Sutton. He did not, as had previously been common among Roman Catholics, mention the Virgin Mary or his parish. His main bequest was of 500 marks to be lent to "the moost honnest, towarde and thryving yonge men" of the Mercers' Company. The interest therefrom, stipulated at 25 marks per annum, was directed to the use of St Bartholomew's Hospital "where the king's grace will thereto appoint and give licence". This was then a common way of making a religious bequest indirectly, at the politically sensitive time of the Reformation, after the abolition of the chantries. If his main bequest should have been disapproved, he provided that instead one hundred poor people of the City of London should be given black gowns. He left several small bequests. Elizabeth was his residuary legatee and sole executrix. The execution of Statham's bequest, however, seems to have been blocked by Elizabeth's new husband, Denys, and the money was not released until 1550, after Denys himself had been admitted gratis to the Mercers' Company At Brook Place, Sutton-at-Hone, Denys had previously built a great house for Statham. The name "Brook Place" may have been its name after Statham's time, in recognition of the locally important family of George Brooke, 9th Baron Cobham. This house was later renamed "Sutton Place", partially demolished, and covered in white stucco. On his marriage to Elizabeth Statham, Denys gained possession of Brook Place, although following Denys's death it was inherited by Elizabeth's daughter, from her previous marriage, who had married the Mercer Vincent Randall, who became Master of the Mercers' Company in 1574. Elizabeth is known to have been an active supporter of the new Protestant religion, of the unorthodox Evangelical variety. She had entertained at her house on the corner of Milk Street (rented from the Mercers) Hugh Latimer (martyred 1555), Robert Barnes, Thomas Garret and William Jerome, (martyred together in 1540) and other evangelicals, and in 1540 had been indicted under the first enquiry under the Six Articles to abolish "diversity in opinions". Bishop Bonner chaired the commission, which included at least 5 mercers: John Alen, Ralph Warren, Richard and John Gresham and Michael Dormer and Guy Crafford, the lawyer and grandson-in-law of Joan, Lady Bradbury. The worth of Elizabeth was then assessed at over £500. In her will dated 1572 she left several charitable bequests, to be distributed by the Dean of St Paul's, designed to encourage the new religion by funding poor scholars at the universities. She also left a bequest to Christ's Hospital. These bequests were opposed by her son-in-law, Randall, but were upheld by the probate court.

On 8 May 1544, shortly before her marriage to Denys, Elizabeth had acquired lands in Great Sankey, Warrington, Cheshire, from Sir Thomas Boteler, who very soon thereafter "made a forcible entry upon and a tortious possession of a messuage and lands in Sankey" on account of which he was sued, before the end of 1544, in the joint names of Elizabeth and Maurice Denys. The couple then sold their Sankey lands to Denys's brother-in-law Walter Bucler, who on 1 January 1547 exchanged them with the king for other lands in Sankey.

== Acquires Wye College ==
In 1546 Denys acquired Wye College, Kent, from Walter Buckler, who had been granted it by the crown following the Dissolution. Buckler was secretary to Queen Katherine Parr and the second husband of Katherine Denys, Maurice's sister, whose first husband had been Edmund Tame II (died 1544) of Fairford, Gloucestershire, grandson of the great wool merchant John Tame. Buckler’s licence to alienate, dated at Westminster 25 December 1546, is recorded in the Patent Rolls:

"Walter Bucler to Maurice Denys and Elizabeth his wife. Mansion, etc., of the late College of Wye, Kent, manors of Perycourte and Surrenden, rectory of Promhill, pensions of 33s. 4d. out of Westwell rectory, 10s. out of Hothefield rectory and 8s. out of Estwell rectory, and all lands in Wye, Wydtheston, Nacolt, Henxsell, Goodmesham, Crondale, Charter Magna, Bethersden, Postlyng, Westbury and Promhill, Kent, which belonged to Wye College.

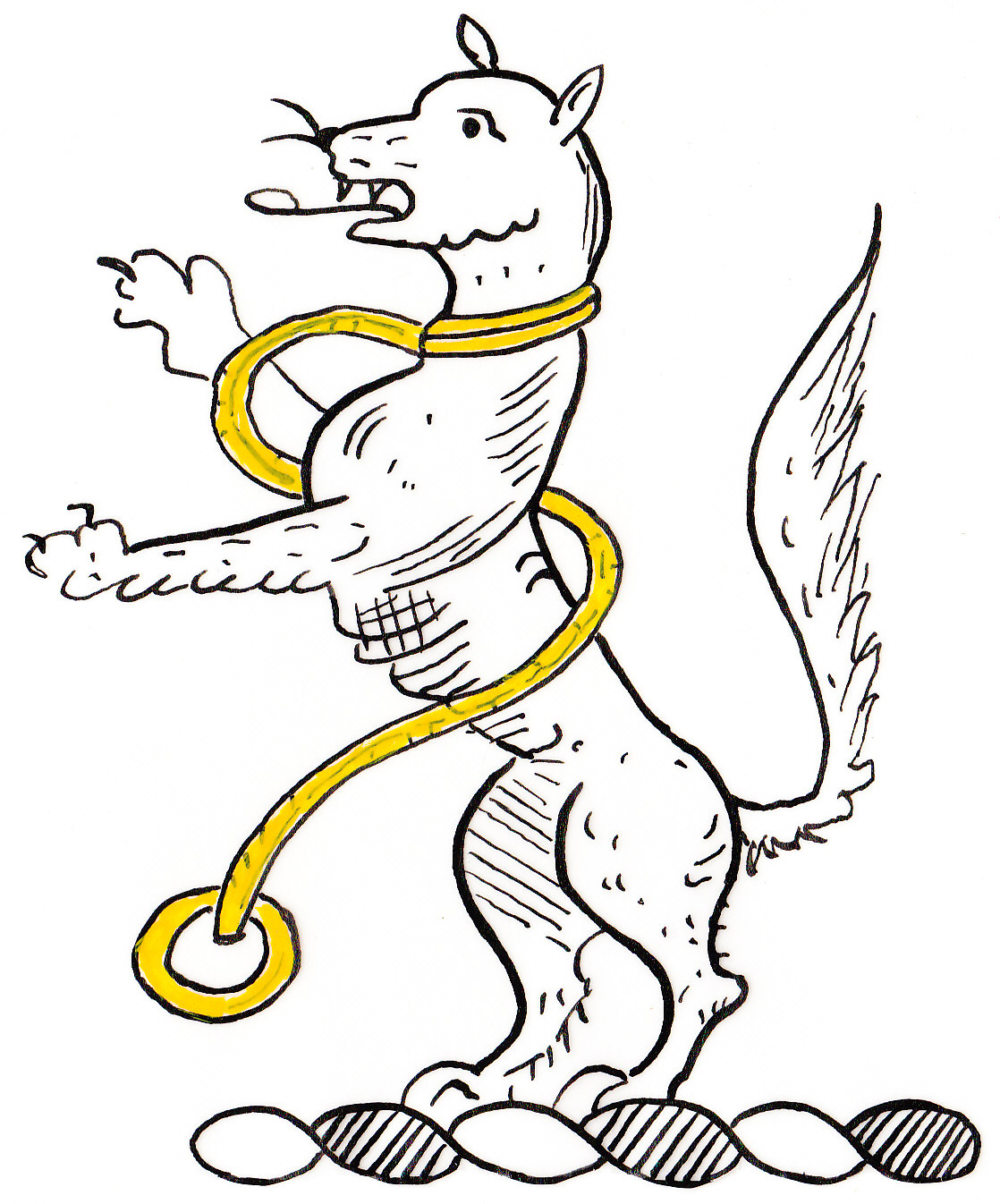
Crest of Sir Maurice Denys A wolf rampant argent chained or. (BL Cott. MS. Claud. CIII, f.157b)

On 22 February 1547, two days after the coronation of King Edward VI, Denys was knighted, and in the same year he became a bencher of the Inner Temple and a Justice of the Peace for Gloucestershire and Kent, as well as being elected to the House of Commons as a Member of Parliament for Malmesbury in Wiltshire. Also in 1547, he sold some of his land in Clerkenwell to Sir Edward North (later 1st Baron North), who in 1545 following the Dissolution had acquired the nearby London Charterhouse and made it his London mansion. In May 1548 he sold the manor of Surrenden to Sir Anthony Aucher (d. 1558), of Otterden in Kent, a commissioner for that county, whose burial place in Bishopsbourne Church in Kent records as follows:

"Sr. Anthony AUCHER, Knt. Mareschall of Callice; Governr. of Guisnes; Master of the Jewel House, in Times of HENRY YE EIGHT. EDWARD YE SIXT, and QUEEN MARY. Slayn at ye Loss of Callice"

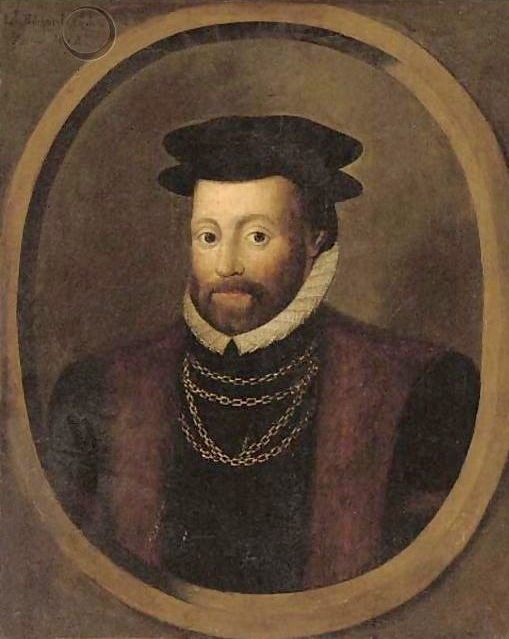
Sir Edward North, an associate of Denys

The Feet of Fines for Middlesex contain the following entry for 1547, the first year of the reign of Edward VI:

"Sir Edward North, knight, Chancellor of the Court of Augmentations, and Alice his wife and Sir Maurice Denys and Elizabeth his wife. Premises and a chapel called Pardon Chapel, in the parish of Clerkenwell. Trinity, Anno 1".

This comprised a chapel and presumably also the graveyard attached to St James's Church, Clerkenwell, then part of the London Charterhouse, known as the "Pardon Churchyard" and used to bury suicides and those executed as felons. It stood between Great Sutton Strest and Clerkenwell Road.

== Treasurer of Calais ==
In December 1548, under Edward Seymour, 1st Duke of Somerset (Protector Somerset), Denys was appointed Treasurer of Calais. His position required him to reside in Calais and proved an unhappy task, thanks chiefly to the shortage of funds. Calais was a personal possession of the English Crown, and such an appointment was a sign of great trust. His uncle Maurice Berkeley, de jure 4th Baron Berkeley (1467–1523) had been appointed Governor of Calais, but died there in 1523 before he had taken up the post. In April 1550, the Privy Council rebuked Denys for his caution in pressing Lord Clinton (as he then was) not to release Boulogne to the French until they had paid a treaty obligation under the Peace of Boulogne. In February 1551, after power had passed to Northumberland, Denys was granted a pension of £150 a year for life.

== Committed to Fleet prison ==
In June 1552, commissioners were sent to audit Denys's accounts and in July they were ordered to investigate what had been done with money he said he had not received. On 20 November he was called back to England and on the 26th was imprisoned in the Fleet. He was summoned to present himself to the Council on 29 January 1553, with commissioners to examine his case in April. Between May and August he appears to have been back in post as Treasurer of Calais, as he was receiving new instructions, but on 12 September was again committed to the Fleet, in due course to be released again.

By now, Denys's wide-reaching purchases were proving too ambitious, and debts weighed on him heavily. He sold several estates, probably to defray debts incurred in his post at Calais. In 1553, he sold Wye College in Kent to Sir William Damsell. Siston was also mortgaged to Rowland Hayward before his death to satisfy his creditors.

== Greets Cardinal Pole ==
On 18 November 1554, under Queen Mary I, who had returned England to the Church of Rome, Denys was ordered by the Privy Council to go to Rochester Castle in Kent to join George Brooke, 9th Baron Cobham of Cobham Hall and Cooling Castle in Kent, in welcoming Cardinal Pole back from his exile, who had recently landed at Dover and progressed via Canterbury Cathedral to Rochester. Pole was entertained at Cooling by Lord Cobham, and then with his magnificent following of 500 horsemen proceeded to Gravesend on the River Thames and thence by barge to the Palace of Whitehall to meet Queen Mary I and to complete the task of re-establishing the Roman Catholic faith in England. Pole rapidly became one of the main forces behind the burning of many English protestant martyrs. Denys had no other government work under Mary, which may have been connected not only with his debts but also with his religious sympathies.

In August 1556, Denys failed to honour two payments to the Crown, one of 1,000 marks and one of £579, so was forced to pledge his manor of Burton in Gloucestershire, and in February 1557 he sold other estates around Bristol.

Denys was pardoned and rehabilitated by Queen Elizabeth I in January 1559 and began to resume his career.

== Death ==
In November 1562 Denys was at Portsmouth to pay soldiers and may have remained there. He died at Portsmouth on 25 August 1563, probably of the plague, which had broken out there. The "Cecil Papers" at Hatfield House contain the following entry, which followed a similar one three days before:

"Sir Adrian Poynings to the Queen. Concerning the state of payments to the troops from Newhaven (i.e. Le Havre) at the death of Sir Maurice Denis (sic) Treasurer. Wherwell 28 August 1563.

Denys had made a complicated Will on 29 October 1562, which was proved on 29 January 1564, after William Paulet, 1st Marquess of Winchester had ordered the Prerogative Court of Canterbury to take over the administration of Denys's estates "for the ease of my Lady Denys, who minds not to take any charge of her late husband's testaments because his debt to the Queen's Highness is not known".

== Succession ==
At his death Denys left a large debt of £7,500 due to the Crown. His heir to his surviving estates, including Siston, was his nephew Richard Denys (1525-1594), a member of parliament, son and heir of his elder brother Sir Walter Denys (c.1501-1571), of Dyrham. The inheritance of such a debt was a burden to Richard, who had also inherited debts from his own father, largely contracted due to his entanglement in Sir Maurice's land purchases and speculations. Richard appears to have redeemed the mortgage to Sir Rowland Hayward (c.1520-1593), twice Lord Mayor of London, but in his desperation to retain Siston turned to fraud. In 1568 he sold Siston to Richard Wyke (alias Week, Weeks) for £3,200, but although he had received part of the purchase price, he refused to complete the transaction. In 1570 Wyke won his case in Chancery and was deemed the lawful owner. Nevertheless in 1576 Richard Denys purported fraudulently to convey Siston to the Crown, as security for having been granted the right to pay off his debt of £7,500 in annual instalments of £100, and was returned £1,500 of Sir Maurice's other assets previously seized by the Crown as security. This was a very favourable deal, as Cecil noted, for the £1,500 on its own could be converted into a perpetuity producing an income of £100 per annum to repay the debt due to the Crown. He then attempted to evict Wyke from possession. However, clearly Siston was no longer his property to utilise in such way as security, and his scheme ultimately failed. The sequence of events of Richard Denys's fraudulent scheme are well recorded, in the handwriting of no less a legal expert that Sir Robert Cecil, who in 1607 had been offered the opportunity to purchase Siston by Robert Wyke, then in the Wood Street Compter debtors' prison. He examined in great detail the facts of the devolution of title from Sir Maurice Denys and recorded his findings in his papers, which survive in the Cecil Papers in Hatfield House. (See s:Cecil Papers (1607) re: Siston Court, Gloucestershire. He was not satisfied that the estate was free of further legal troubles and declined the opportunity. Richard Denys died in poverty in 1594 and in 1608 Wyke sold Siston to Sir Henry Billingsley.

== Dame Elizabeth Denys's Jewels ==
A deed dated 2 February 1563 is preserved amongst the charters of Margam Abbey in Glamorgan and records the return of Dame Elisabeth's jewels by Denys's nephew Thomas Carne of Ewenny Priory, son of his sister Anne and Sir Edward Carne:

"A Deed whereby Dame Elizabeth Dennys, wife of Sir Mauryce Dennys of St. John's Street, in county Middlesex, knight, acknowledges the receipt from Thomas Carne of Wenny county Glamorgan, Esq., of a cheyne of gold with a button, a jewyll with an unicornes horne, thre dyamondes, and one obligacian of £40 for a ring which must be delyvered the last day of this instant Februarye and if the said Thomas shall pay £30 on 31st May next then a recognisauce dated 21st Dec. 1561 to be void. Signed, sealed, and attested by Thomas Marshall junior son of Thomas Marshall, notary".
