= St John's Jerusalem =

Coordinates: 51°24′32″N 0°14′15″E

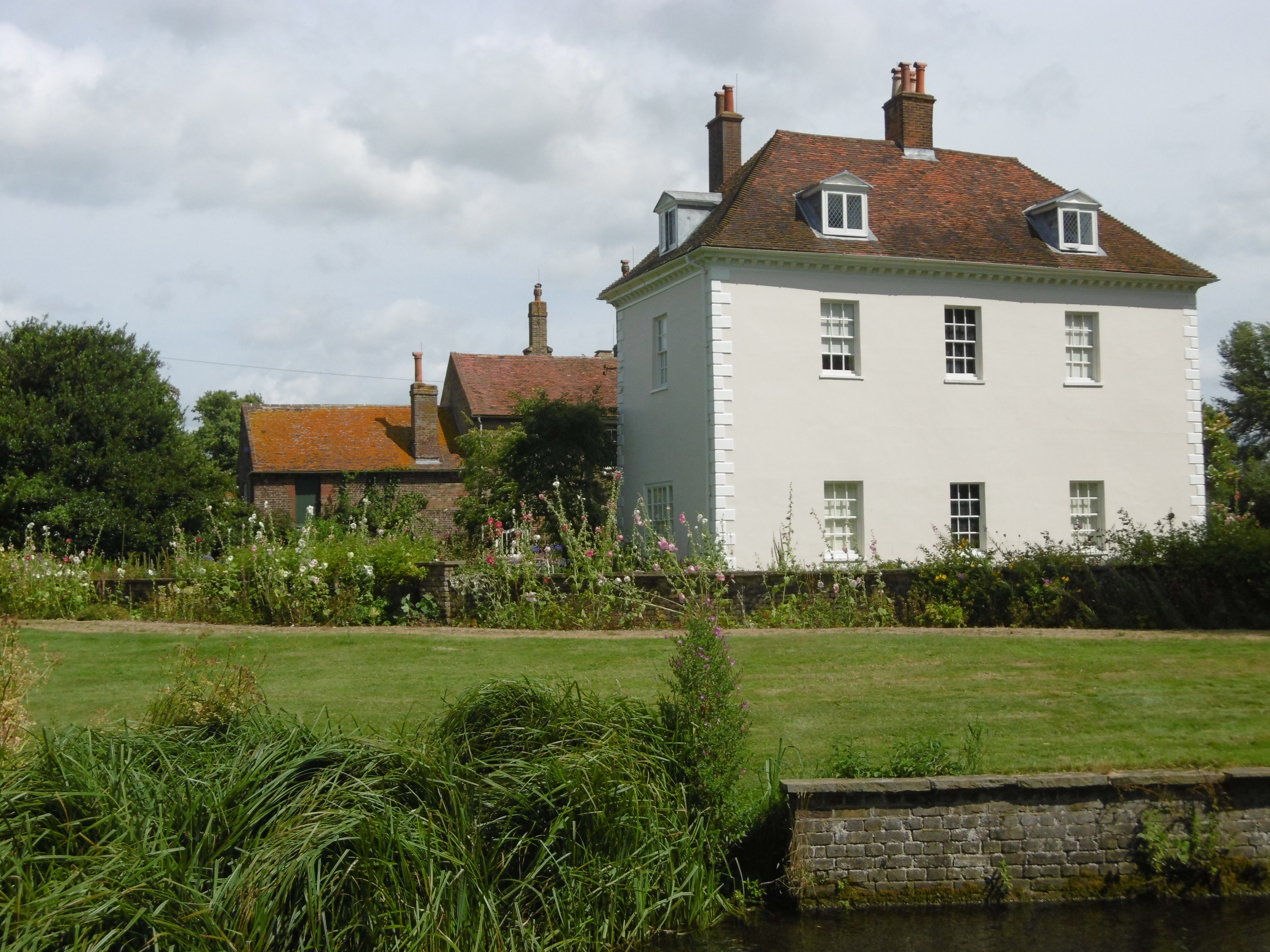
- St John's Jerusalem across the River Darent

- Location within England
- Alternative names: Sutton Manor; the Manor of Sutton-at-Hone

General information
- Type: Manor House
- Location: Sutton-at-Hone, Kent, England
- Inaugurated: 1199
- Owner: National Trust

Design and construction
- Designations

Listed Building – Grade II*
- Official name: St John's Jerusalem
- Designated: 1 August 1952
- Reference no.: 1085776

St John's Jerusalem or Sutton-at-Hone Preceptory is a National Trust property at Sutton-at-Hone, Kent, England which includes the 13th century chapel of the Knights Hospitaller and a garden moated by the River Darent. The chapel and garden are open to the public.

== History ==
It was established in 1199 as a commandery of the Knights Hospitaller of the Order of Saint John of Jerusalem until it was sold to Sir Maurice Denys, the Receiver of the Order at the time of the Dissolution. The medieval sections of the property were predominantly constructed around 1234, when Henry III procured the felling of five oak trees from Tonbridge Forest. By 1388, the property had ceased to be used as a preceptory.

Naturalist Abraham Hill established an orchard here in 1670, with apples and pears from Herefordshire and Devon that were used for making cider and perry. Varieties that were introduced into Kent as a result included the Kentish Pippin. From 1755 it was the home of the county historian of Kent, Edward Hasted. His excessive expenditure on the property may have been responsible for his bankruptcy in 1796, and subsequent term of imprisonment of five years.

The building was given to the nation in 1943 by Sir Stephen Tallents, and was open to the public twice a week in the 1950s. The property has been a Grade II* listed building since 1 August 1952 and was scheduled under the Ancient Monuments and Archaeological Areas Act 1979 as a site of national importance by the Secretary of State for National Heritage on 5 September 1994. It is now let from the National Trust as a private residence. Public access is to the chapel and garden only.

=== Priors of the Hospital ===
- Radyngton, John, fl. 1396
- Botell, Robert, fl. 1460
- Weston, John, fl. 1485

== Grounds ==
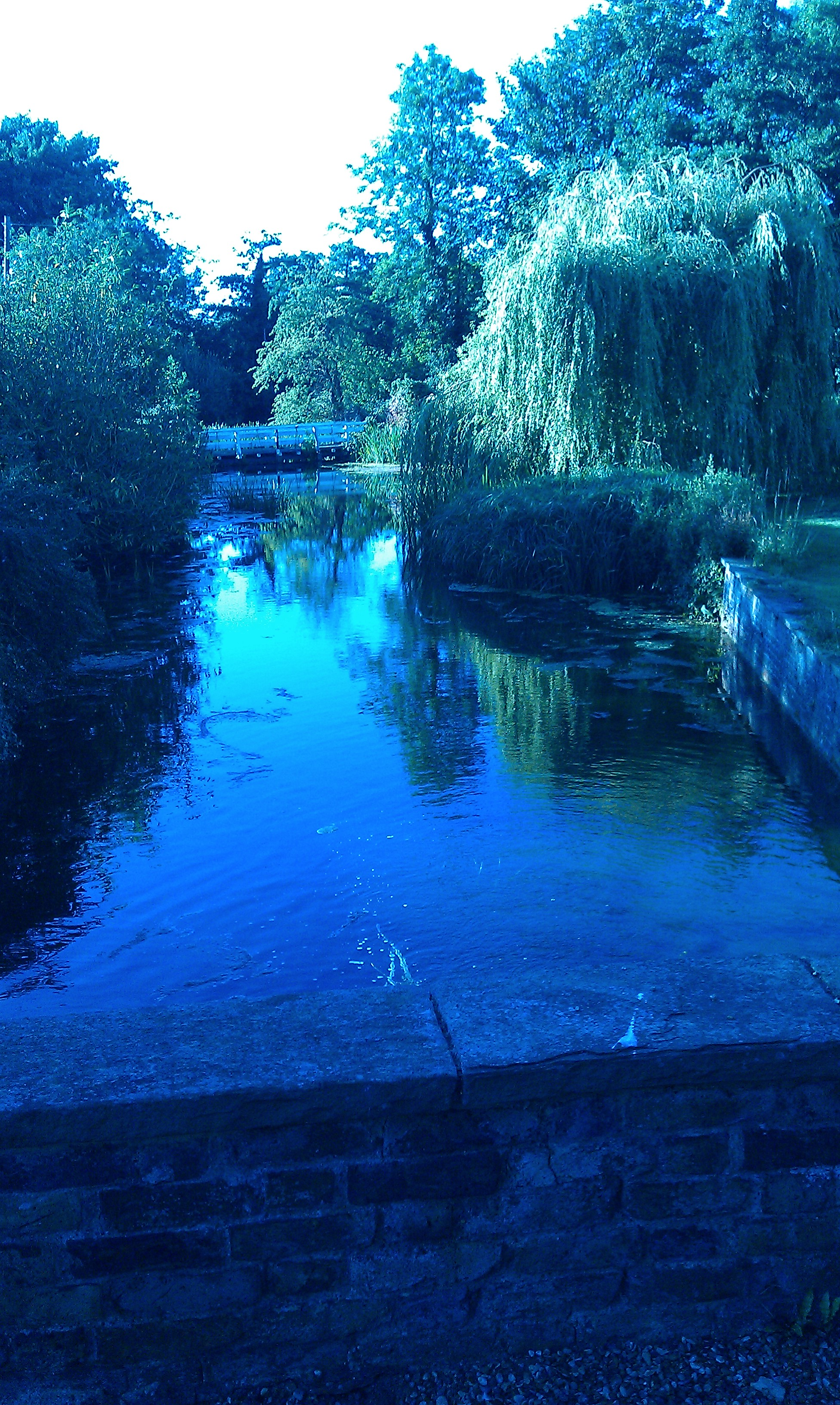
St John's Jerusalem's moat

The moat dates from the 13th century, and surrounds an artificial island of 22,200m^{2}. The moat is bridged three times, including by a Grade II listed 19th century brick footbridge. The grounds contain a cedar of Lebanon. Only the south-western section of the moat is part of the River Darent. The moat has, however, suffered from environmental problems. It ran dry in both 1976 and 1988 and was affected by sedimentation and pollution after a recent dredging of the Darent. The dredging was attempted in order to foster the appearance of a 1930s Country Life setting. However, it had to be halted after it was discovered that scheduled monument consent had not been obtained. Although it was subsequently granted, the sustainability of such techniques has been called into question.

The garden also hosts a former fishpond, now occupied by marshlands. Before the dissolution of the monasteries, the lawn to the north of the property was used as burial ground for the chapel, but thereafter as a midden.
