= William Damsell =

16th-century English politician

Sir William Damsell (c. 1520 – 16 June 1582), sometimes spelt Damosel, was Receiver-General of the Court of Wards and Liveries and a Member of Parliament.

Of a gentle but obscure family in Devon, Damsell gained some education at the University of Oxford, but there is no record of his taking a degree. He was good at languages, serving as King's factor in the Seventeen Provinces of the Netherlands from 1546 to 1552, and was a member of the Mercers' Company of the City of London.

Damsell joined the House of Commons of England as a member for Wilton in 1553, and in 1555 returned to represent Arundel. In 1563, he was elected from Hastings, to a parliament which was not dissolved until 1567.

In June 1553, Damsell signed Edward VI's "devise for the succession". Despite this, he was knighted by Queen Mary I on 2 October 1553, following her coronation, and was later appointed Receiver-General of the Court of Wards and Liveries.

Also in 1553, Damsell bought Wye College, in Kent, from Sir Maurice Denys

Stephen Batman's The Travayled Pylgrime (1569), a verse translation of Olivier de la Marche's poem le Chevalier délibéré (1483), was dedicated to "Sir Wm. Damsell, Knight, Receiver General of the Queen's Court of Wards and Liveries".

Damsell died on 16 June 1582 and was buried at the church of St Mary Aldermanbury, London. By his Will he gave one hundred pounds to poor scholars at Oxford, "...whereof I was a scholar in times past".
