= James Bassett =

James Bassett may refer to:

- James Bassett (author) (1912–1978), American newspaper editor and author
- James Bassett (missionary) (1834–1906), Canadian-born American Presbyterian missionary
- James P. Bassett (born 1956), American lawyer and justice of the New Hampshire Supreme Court

== See also ==
- James Basset (c. 1526–1558), Member of the Parliament of England
- Ted Bassett (executive) (born 1921 as James Edward Bassett), American executive in law enforcement and horse racing
