= Denys brass, Olveston =

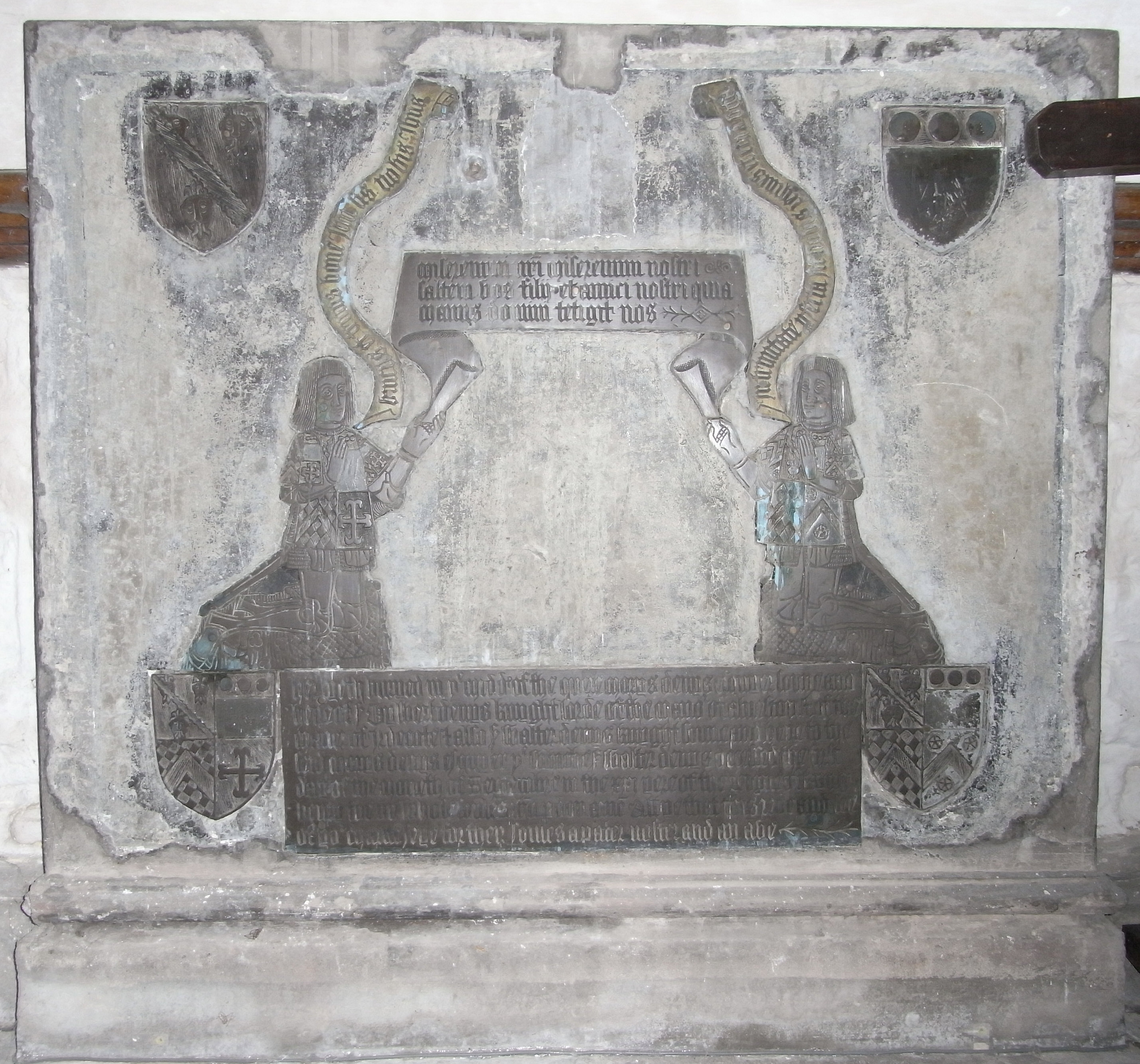
Denys brass, 1505, Olveston Church, east wall of south transept

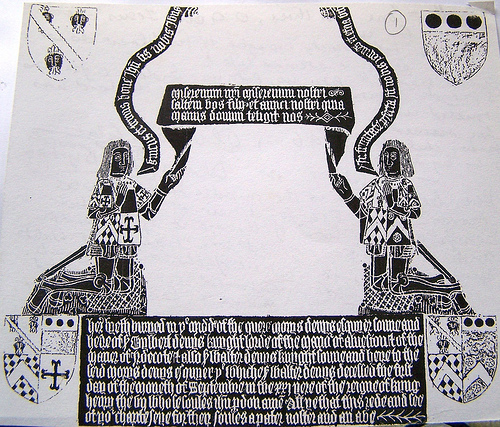
Rubbing of the brass

The Denys monumental brass in Olveston Church, Gloucestershire, dates from 1505, and is one of only about 80 surviving monumental brasses in Gloucestershire. It was erected following the death of Sir Walter Denys in 1505, and shows the latter together with his father Maurice Denys, both Sheriffs of Gloucestershire. The Denys family were at various times lords of the manors of Alveston, Earthcott Green, Siston and Dyrham in Gloucestershire.

== Heraldry ==
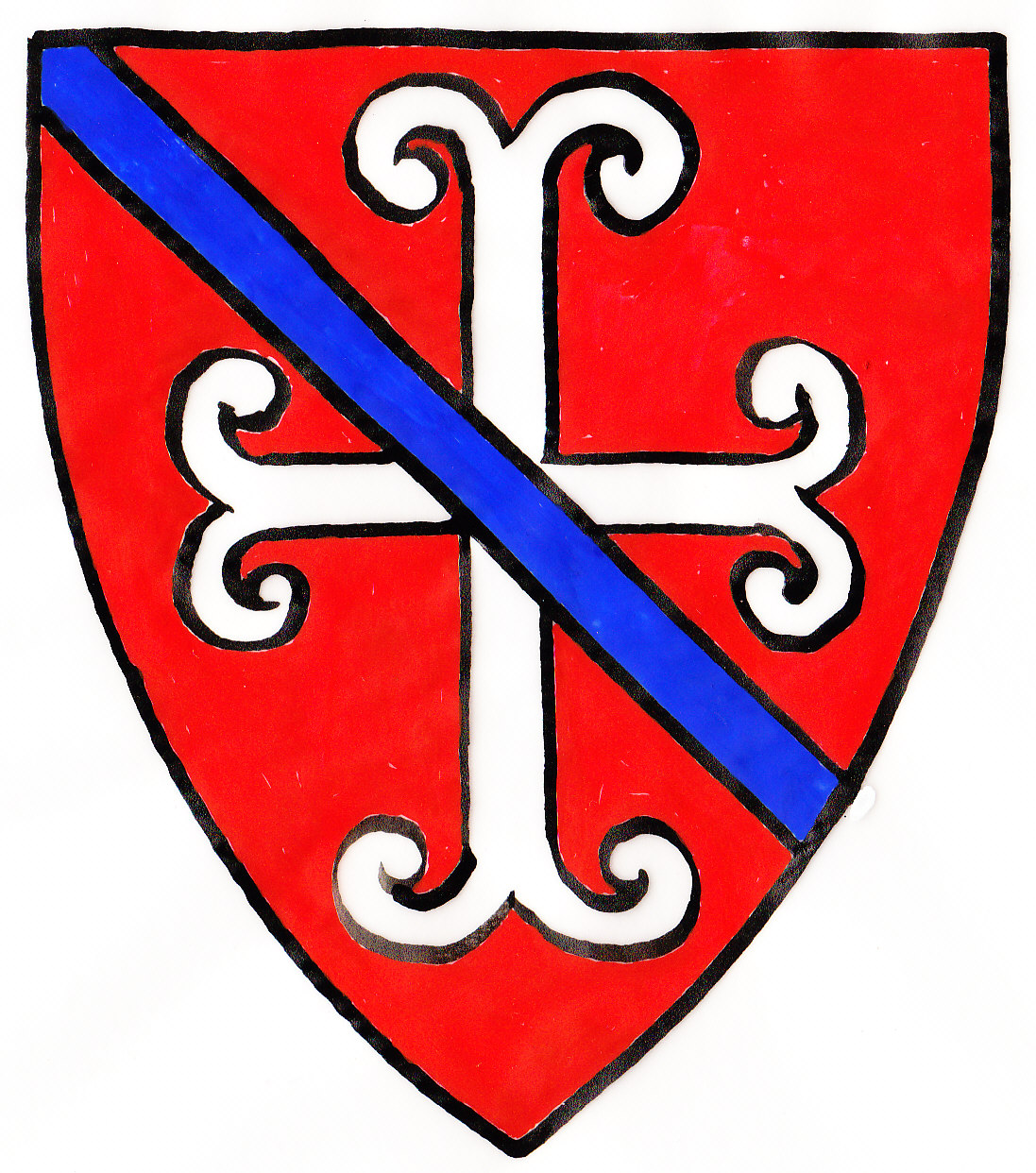
Arms of Sir Guy Ferre (d. 1323), steward of Queen Eleanor of Castile: Gules, a fer-de-moline argent over all a bendlet azure. As seen sculpted on gatehouse of Butley Priory

The coats of arms displayed are as follows: Top left (Dexter (1st) Quarter (to bearer's R, viewer's L)): Denys; Top right: (Sinister) Russell. Bottom L (3rd Q ): 1st: Denys; 2nd: Russell; 3rd: Gorges; 4th: a cross moline or fer de moline, is for the family of Eleanor Ferre, da. of Sir John Ferre, of Tothill, Lincs., an heiress of the Gorges. (Raymond Gorges, History of the Family of Gorges, Boston USA, 1944; The arms of Sir Guy Ferre( d. 1323), possibly his brother, can be seen above the pedestrian gateway of Butley Priory (of which he held the advowson) where the fer de moline of his canting arms is shown in the form of a cross moline). Bottom R (4th Q): 1st: Denys; 2nd: Russell; 3rd: Gorges; 4th: prob. Danvers. Armorials repeated on tabard fronts and sleeves. Maurice Denys the father to L in Dexter position of honour. Russell was his heiress-mother, Gorges a former Russell heiress. On the R. is Sir Walter Denys, the son, with the arms of his co-heiress second wife, Agnes Danvers, in the 4th Q.

=== Blasons ===
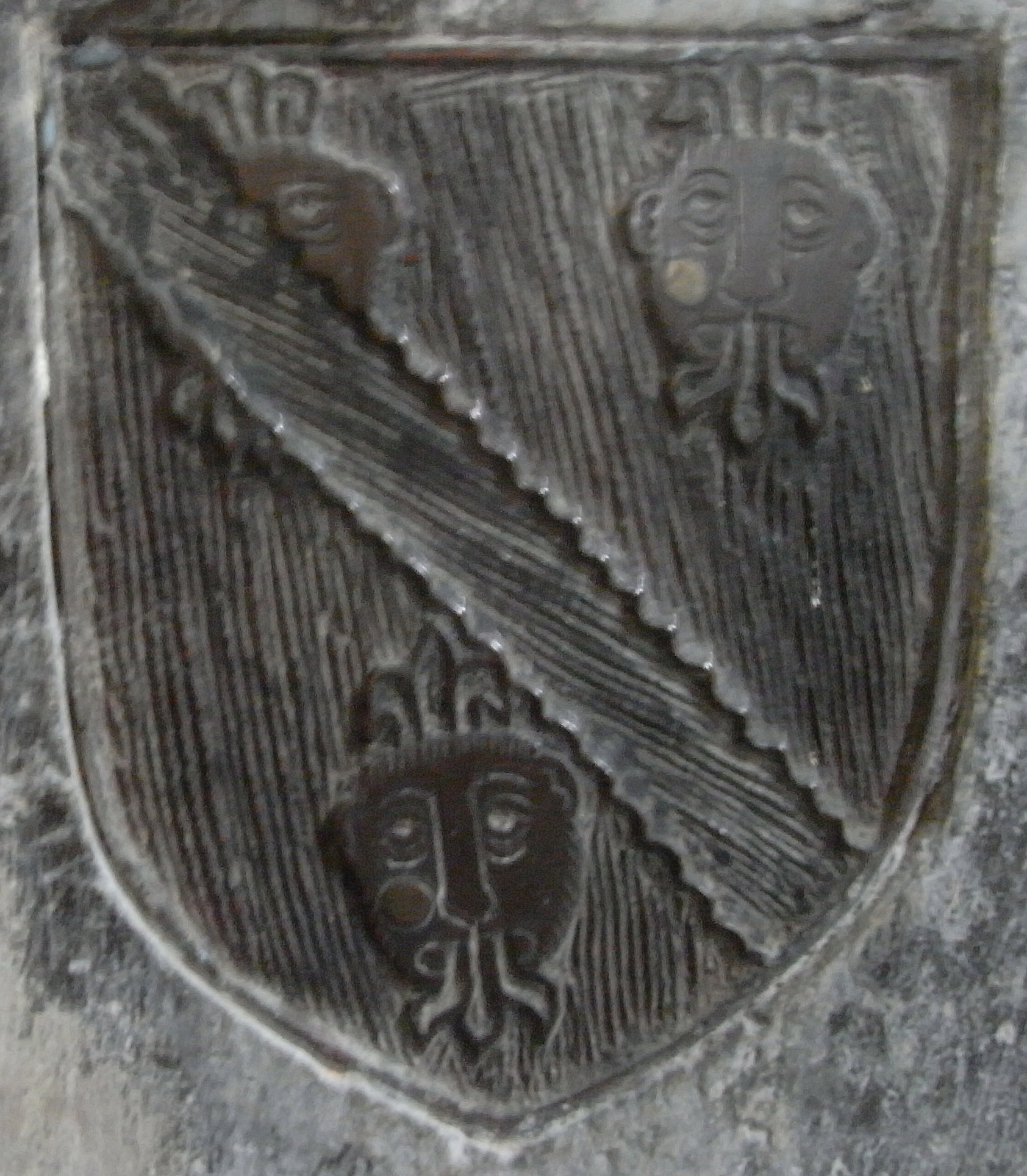
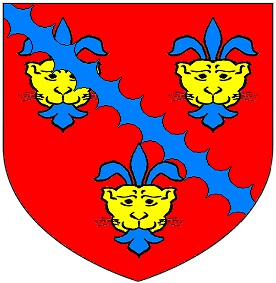
Denys arms:left as sculpted on denys brass, Olveston; right, recreated version with tinctures: Gules, 3 leopards' faces or jessant-de-lys azure, over all a bend engrailled of the last

Denys: 3 leopards' faces jessant-de-lys, over all a bend engrailled. With tinctures it becomes:Gules, 3 leopards' faces or jessant-de-lys azure, over all a bend engrailled of the last. The Denys arms blazoned with these tinctures survive earliest in BL Add. MS 45131, f. 54, a 1509 drawing of Hugh Denys of Osterley (d. 1511) at the deathbed of Henry VII. The armourials are the arms of Cantilupe of Candleston Castle, Glamorgan, probably granted as "arms of patronage" to their feudal officials or tenants the Denys's, differenced by the imposition of a bend engrailled, probably before 1258. Cantilupe arms, reversed for difference, are still borne as the official arms of the See of Hereford, in honour of St. Thomas de Cantilupe, Bishop of Hereford, canonised in 1320. The Denys arms are a rare ancient exception to the rule "no colour on colour or metal on metal" propounded by John Gibbon in his 1682 Introductio ad Latinam Blasoniam, in which he lists (pp. 150–1) some exceptions, including Denys: "Now for my reader's diversion and delight I will insert what hath fallen under my observation". The Denys arms are also shown sculpted on the wings of the nearby Tudor mansion Siston Court, built by Sir Maurice Denys (d. 1563), great-grandson of Maurice Denys (d. 1466), yet there they have been altered to a neater composition, with the bend passing between the leopards' faces, and the latter composition was also adopted by the Denys family of Pucklechurch, lords of that manor until 1701.

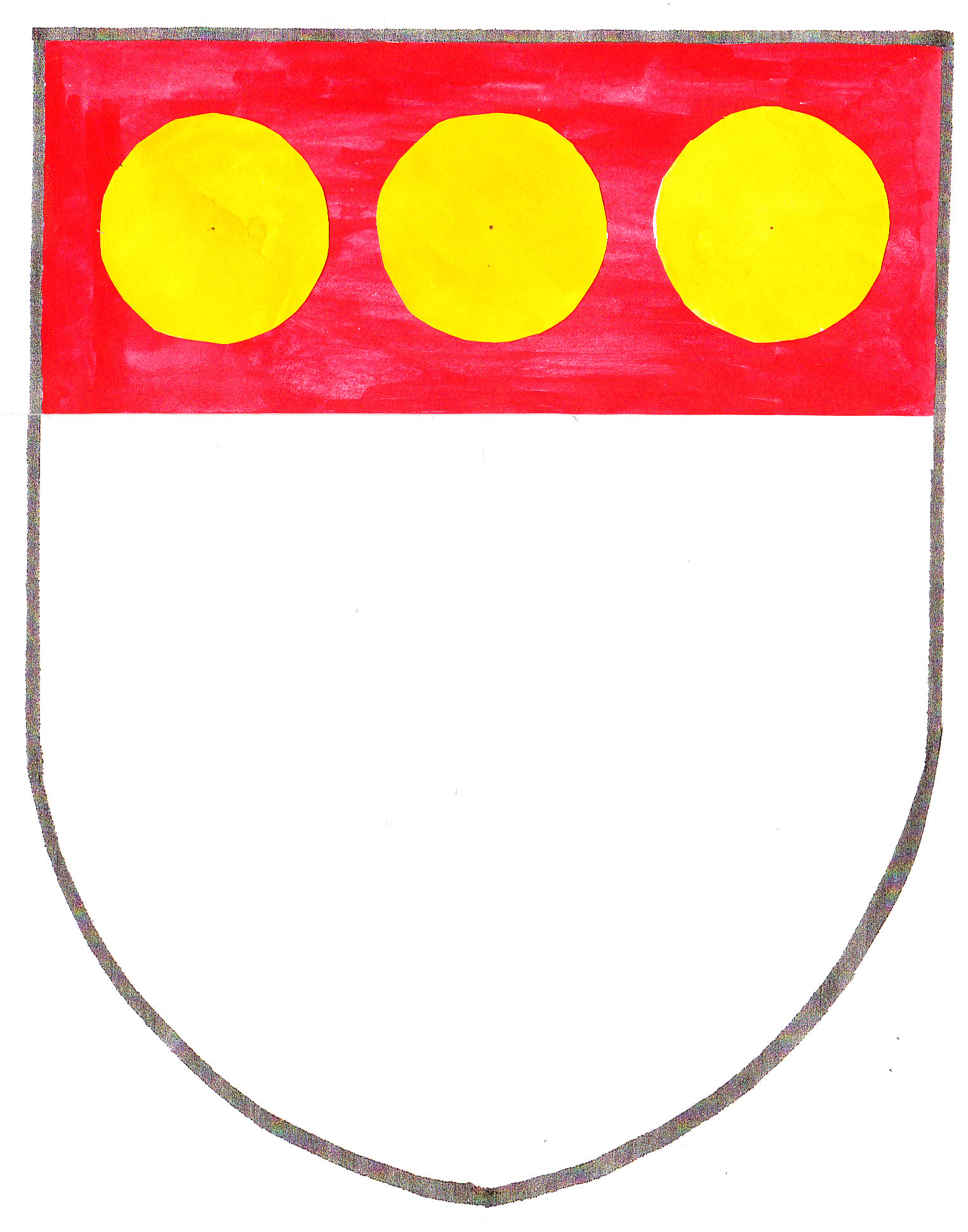
Arms of Russell of Kingston Russell & Dyrham: Argent, on a chief gules 3 bezants

Russell: (of Kingston Russell, Dorset & Dyrham, Glos.) Sir Gilbert Denys of Siston had married c.1404, as his second wife, Margaret Russell, eldest daughter and later co-heiress of Sir Maurice Russell of Dyrham.Argent, on a chief gules 3 bezants. She was the mother of Maurice Denys. (Bezants are Byzantine gold coins, thought to have been very popular with the Crusaders who plundered Constantinople in 1204, not having received the previously agreed funding from the Emperor.)

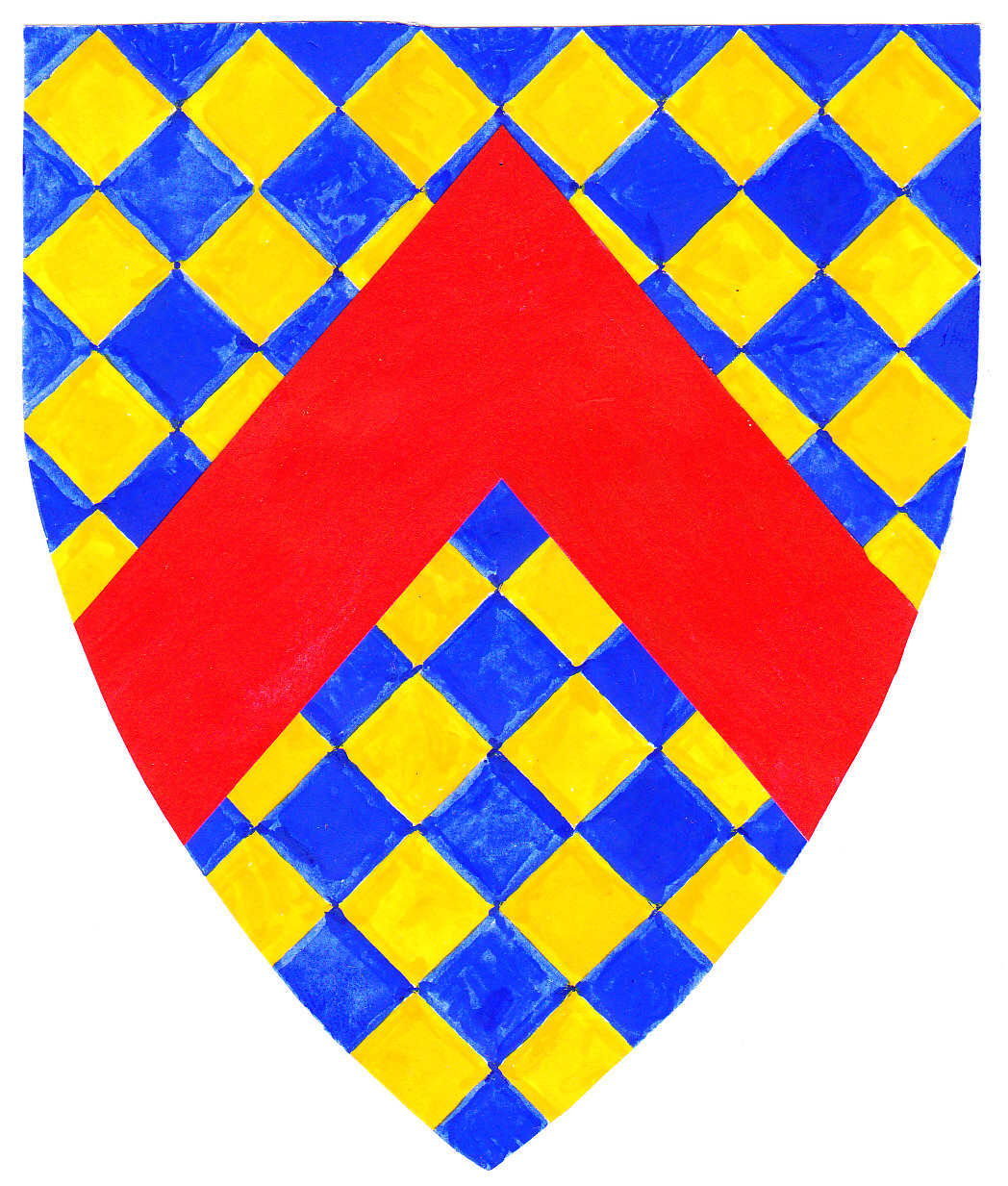
"Gorges Modern": Lozengy or and azure, a chevron gules

Gorges (of Knighton, Isle of Wight; Wraxall, Somerset; Bradpole, Dorset). Sir Theobald I Russell (d. 1341) of Kingston Russell, Dorset, grandfather of Sir Maurice Russell of Dyrham, had been the ward of Sir Ralph III de Gorges, 1st Baron Gorges (d. 1324), and had been married-off by his warder to his second daughter Eleanor de Gorges. Eleanor's third son Theobald II Russell inherited from his uncle Ralph IV de Gorges (d. 1331), 2nd Baron, the former Gorges estates and changed his name to "Gorges", adopting their arms, apparently as part of the arrangement. The arms of Gorges were originally canting arms of a Gurges, which is Latin for whirlpool, then c.1300 were changed voluntarily to Lozengy, or and azure, in recognition of the de Morvilles, ancestors of the Gorges. Yet there was a celebrated dispute in 1347 (see Warbelton v. Gorges) when these lozengy arms were claimed by John de Warbelton against Theobald II Russell "de Gorges" and a court of honour adjudged the arms to Warbelton. Instead of adopting completely new arms, Theobald merely added a red chevron as a difference, blazoned Lozengy or and azure, a chevron gules. These arms are known as "Gorges Modern". The Denys family should logically have quartered the undifferenced arms of their ancestor Ralph III de Gorges, not those of Theobald II Russell "de Gorges", their cousin, unless as appears to have been the case, it was customary to apply such heraldic judgements retrospectively.

Danvers (of Cothorpe, Oxon.) Maurice Denys's second wife, and Sir Walter's mother, was Agnes Danvers, co-heiress of Sir Robert Danvers (d. 1467), Chief Justice of the Common Pleas. The arms blazoned in the 4th Q. on Sir Walter's tabard appear as A chevron between 3 roses, yet the arms given by Burkes 1884 for this family are quite different Argent, on a bend gules 3 martlets (house martens) vert legged or. The arms of Danvers of Warwick however are closer to those depicted here: Gules, a chevron between 3 mullets (stars) of 6 points or.

Assessment

The brass is likely to have been erected well after the date of the interment, so if indeed there are errors on the part of the engraver, or in the instructions given him, it may have been felt acceptable to let the matter rest, rather than incur considerable expense in having it remade. On the other hand, if the arms are all correct, there are major lacunae in the literature and official records of Denys family history.

== Inscriptions ==
Below

Her lyeth buryed in ye midde. of the quere [i.e. choir/chancel] Maurice Denys esquyer sonne and here of sir Gylbert Denys knyght lorde of the maner of Alveston & of the maner of Irdecote [i.e. Earthcott Green] & also sir walter Denys knyght sonne and here to the seid morys denys esquyer ye. whiche sir walter denys decessed the first day of the moneth of Septembre in the xxi yere of the reigne of kyng henry the vii [i.e. 1506] whose soules Jhesu pardon amen. All ye that this rede and see of yor. charitie seye for their soules a pater noster and an ave [i.e. Hail Mary].

Above

Miseremini mei miseremini nostri saltem vos filii et amici nostri quia manus domini tetigit nos. (Be ye all pitiful of me, be ye all pitiful of us, at the least ye our sons and friends, because the hand of the Lord hath touched us) (Job 19:21, altered)

On scroll issuing from mouth of Maurice

Unicus et trinus bone jhesu sis nobis Jesus (One and Three o good Jesus, you are to us Jesus)

On scroll issuing from mouth of Sir Walter

In trinitate perfecta sit nobis requies et eterna vita (In the perfected Trinity may there become to us rest and eternal life)

== Comparisons ==
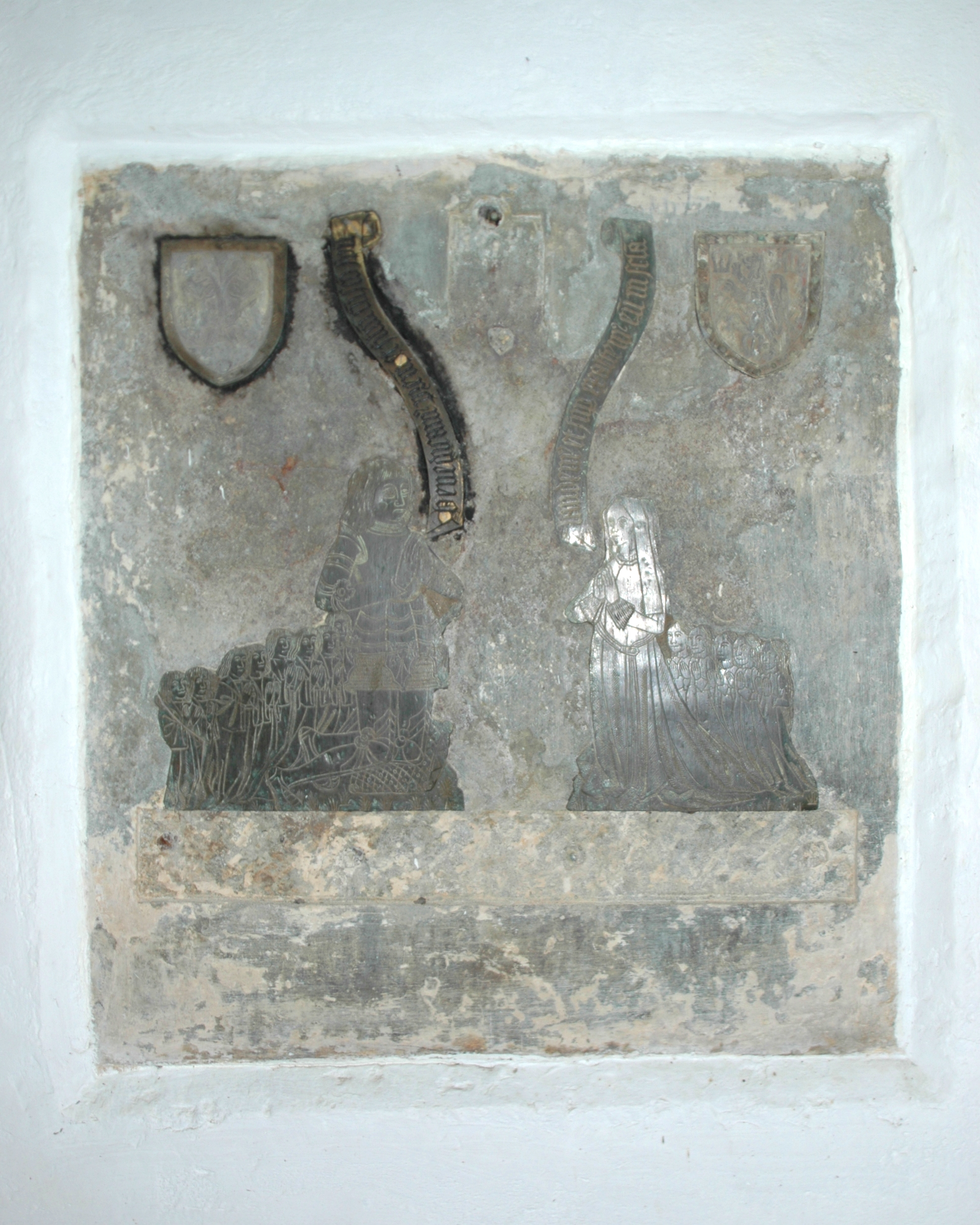
Memorial brass of James Samewell and his wife, circa 1500, in St Mary the Virgin Church, Cottisford, Oxfordshire

== Sources ==
- Davis, Cecil T., The Monumental Brasses of Gloucestershire, London, 1899, pp. 106–109, no.44, Olveston
- Transactions of the Bristol and Gloucestershire Archaeological Society, vol 12, 1888, p. 326, "Olveston Church"
