= Monumental brasses of Gloucestershire =

Church art in Gloucestershire, England

About 80 ancient monumental brasses survive in Gloucestershire, many in the parish churches at Cirencester and Northleach. Many have been lost to theft over the ages. The first complete listing of brasses in Gloucestershire was made by Cecil T. Davis, who stated that they may be divided into three categories: ecclesiastical, military and civil.

== List of monumental brasses of Gloucestershire ==
Image (Drawing/Rubbing; Photograph)	Date	Location	Name
	c. 1370	Winterbourne	A lady of the Bradestone family
	1396	Temple Church, Bristol	Civilian, half-length. Now in St Mary Redcliffe.
	1400	Deerhurst	Sir John Cassy (judicial costume) and wife Alice, with canopy
	c. 1400	Cirencester	Wine merchant(?) and wife Margaret, imperfect with canopy
	c. 1400	Northleach	John Taylour (wool merchant) and wife Joane
	1401	Chipping Campden	William Greville (civilian costume) and wife Marion, with canopy
	c. 1411	Barstaple House (former Barstaple Almshouses Trinity Chapel; now private residences), Old Market, Bristol	John Barstaple
(Picture on external site) (Drawing of Thoma Adynet) (Drawing of his wife)	1409	Northleach	Thomas Adynet and his wife
	c. 1411	Barstaple House (former Barstaple Almshouses Trinity Chapel; now private residences), Old Market, Bristol	Isabella, wife of John Barstaple
	1416	Dyrham	Maurice Russell, knight
	1417	Wotton-under-Edge	Thomas de Berkeley, 5th Baron Berkeley
	c. 1430	Quinton	Joan Clopton (vowess) with canopy
	1438	Cirencester	Richard Dixton in armour, with canopy
	1439	St Mary Redcliffe, Bristol	Sir John Juyn in judicial costume
	1440	Cirencester	Robert Page in civilian costume and wife Margaret, 6 sons, 8 daughters with canopy
	1442	Cirencester	Reginald Spyeer in civilian costume and four wives: Margaret, Juliana, Margaret and Joan
	c. 1445	Newland	Man in armour and wife, imperfect, crest of "free miner"
	1447	Northleach	Thomas Fortey, imperfect; William Scors, both in civilian costume, and their wife Agnes (head missing), with two groups of children and canopy, both imperfect
	1450	Chipping Campden	William Welley in civilian costume and wife Alice
	c. 1450	Lechlade	Wool merchant and wife
	1459	Northleach	John Fortey in civilian costume with canopy
	c. 1460	Temple Church, Bristol	A priest and lady, palimpsest. Now in St Mary Redcliffe (resin replica of reverse side shown on right side of image).
	1461	St Peter's, Bristol	Robert Lond, chaplain
	1461	Rodmarton	John Edward in civilian costume
	1462	Cirencester	William Prelatte in armour and two wives Agnes and Joan
	1467	Chipping Campden	John Lethenard in civilian dress and wife Joan
	c. 1470	Cirencester	William Notyngham in civilian dress, imperfect, and wife Christine
	1491	St Mary Redcliffe, Bristol	Richard Mede in tabard and two wives, to right Juliana/Anne Pauncefoot, left Elizabeth Sharp
	1478	St John's, Bristol	Thomas Rowley in civilian dress and wife Margaret
	1478	Cirencester	Ralph Parsons, priest
	c. 1480	St Mary Redcliffe, Bristol	John Jay, civilian, and wife Joan
	c. 1480	Cirencester	A priest
	c. 1480	Cirencester	Civilian and wife
	1484	Chipping Campden	William Gybbys, civilian and three wives: Alice, Margaret and Marion
	c. 1485	Mitcheldean	Wives of Thomas Baynham (d. 1499/1500): (1) Margaret Hody (left) and (2) Alice Walwyn (right)
	c. 1485	Northleach	Woolman and wife
	1493	Tormarton	John Ceysyll, civilian
	1497	Cirencester	John Benet, civilian, imperfect, and wife Joan
	1497	Sevenhampton	John Camber, civilian
	1500	Fairford	John Tame in armour and wife Alice
	c. 1500	Cirencester	Civilian, imperfect, head restored
	c. 1500	Minchinhampton	Civilian and wife
	1501	Northleach	William Midwinter and his wife
	1501	Northleach	Robert Serche and his wife Anne
	1522	St Mary Redcliffe, Bristol	John Brook (or Broke) and his wife Joan, daughter of Richard Amerike
	1526	Northleach	Thomas Busshe and his wife Johane
	1530	Northleach	William Lander, priest
	1505	Olveston	Denys brass, Maurice Denys and son Sir Walter Denys, both in armour
	c. 1510	Lechlade	John Twynyho (?) wool merchant
	1534	Fairford	Sir Edmund Tame I and wives (1) Agnes Greville, to his left; (2) Elizabeth Tyringham, to his right
	c. 1570	Bristol Grammar School	Nicholas Thorne (centre), first wife Mary (right) with children (Jane, John, Francis, Robart, Mary, Johane, Nycholas, Edward), and second wife Bridget with children (Bridgett and John)
	1636	St James' Priory, Bristol	

== Sources ==
- Davis, Cecil T. (1881–2). List of Monumental Brasses in Gloucestershire. Transactions of the Bristol and Gloucestershire Archaeological Society, Vol. 6.
- Davis, Cecil T. (1899). The Monumental Brasses of Gloucestershire.
- Lack, William; Stuchfield, H. Martin; Whittemore, Philip (2005). The Monumental Brasses of Gloucestershire. Monumental Brass Society County Series. London: Monumental Brass Society. ISBN 9780954327125.
