= Maurice Denys (sheriff) =

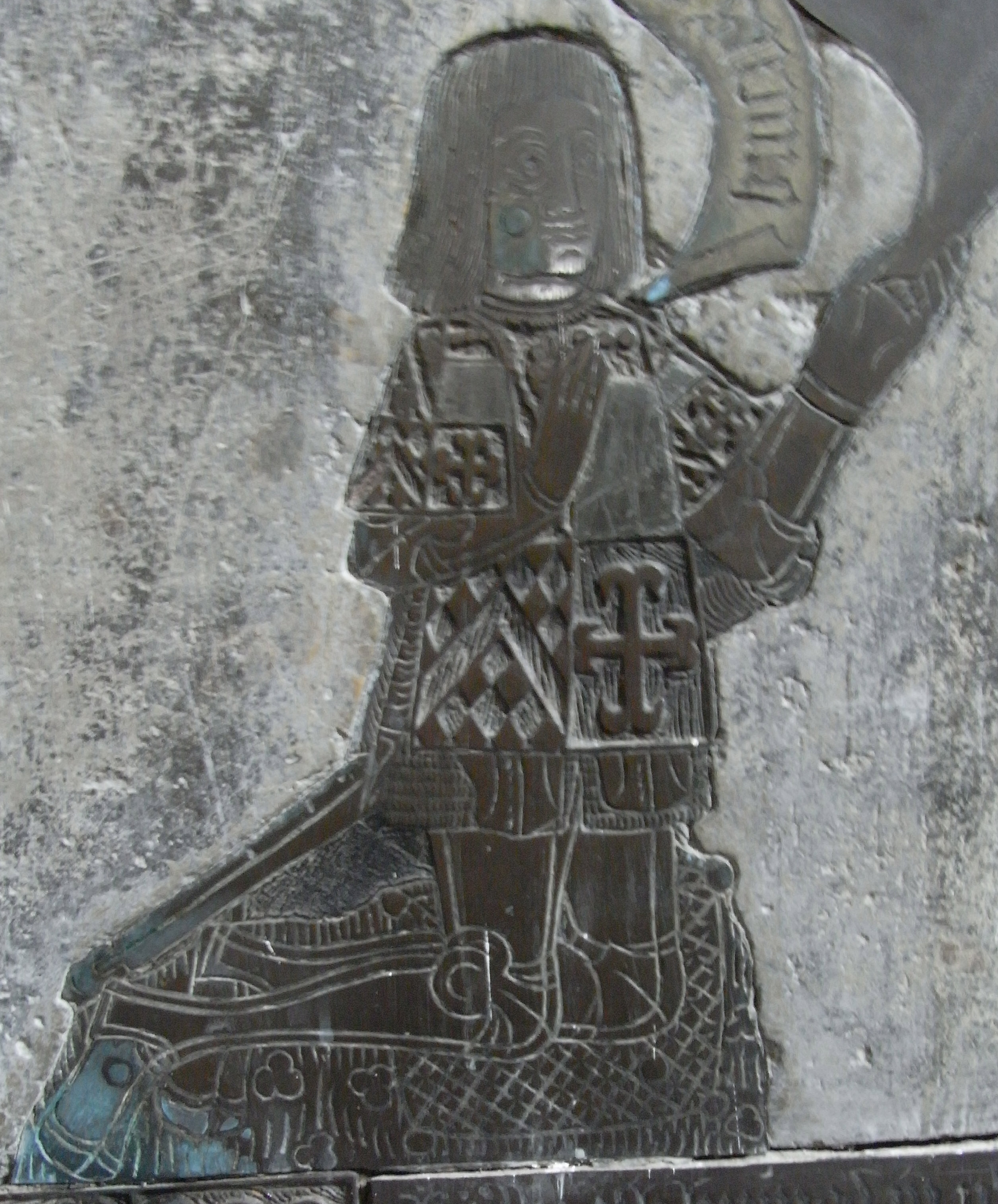
Maurice Denys, detail from Denys monumental brass of 1505 (see below) at Olveston Church, Glos. A non-contemporaneous depiction made 39 years after his death

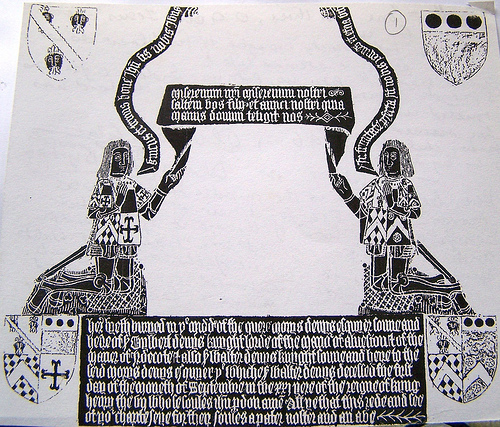
1505 monumental brass at Olveston Church, Glos. (brass rubbing). Maurice Denys kneels at left, his son Sir Walter Denys (d. 1505) at right

Maurice Denys (c. 1410–1466), Esquire, of Siston, Gloucestershire, was twice Sheriff of Gloucestershire in 1460 and 1461. The Denys family were stated by Sir Robert Atkyns, the 18th-century historian of Gloucestershire, to have provided more sheriffs for that county than any other family.

== Family background ==
He was the eldest son and heir of Sir Gilbert Denys (d. 1422) of Siston, Glos., by his 3rd wife Margaret Russell (d. 1460), eldest daughter of Sir Maurice Russell of Dyrham, Glos.

== Birth and baptism ==
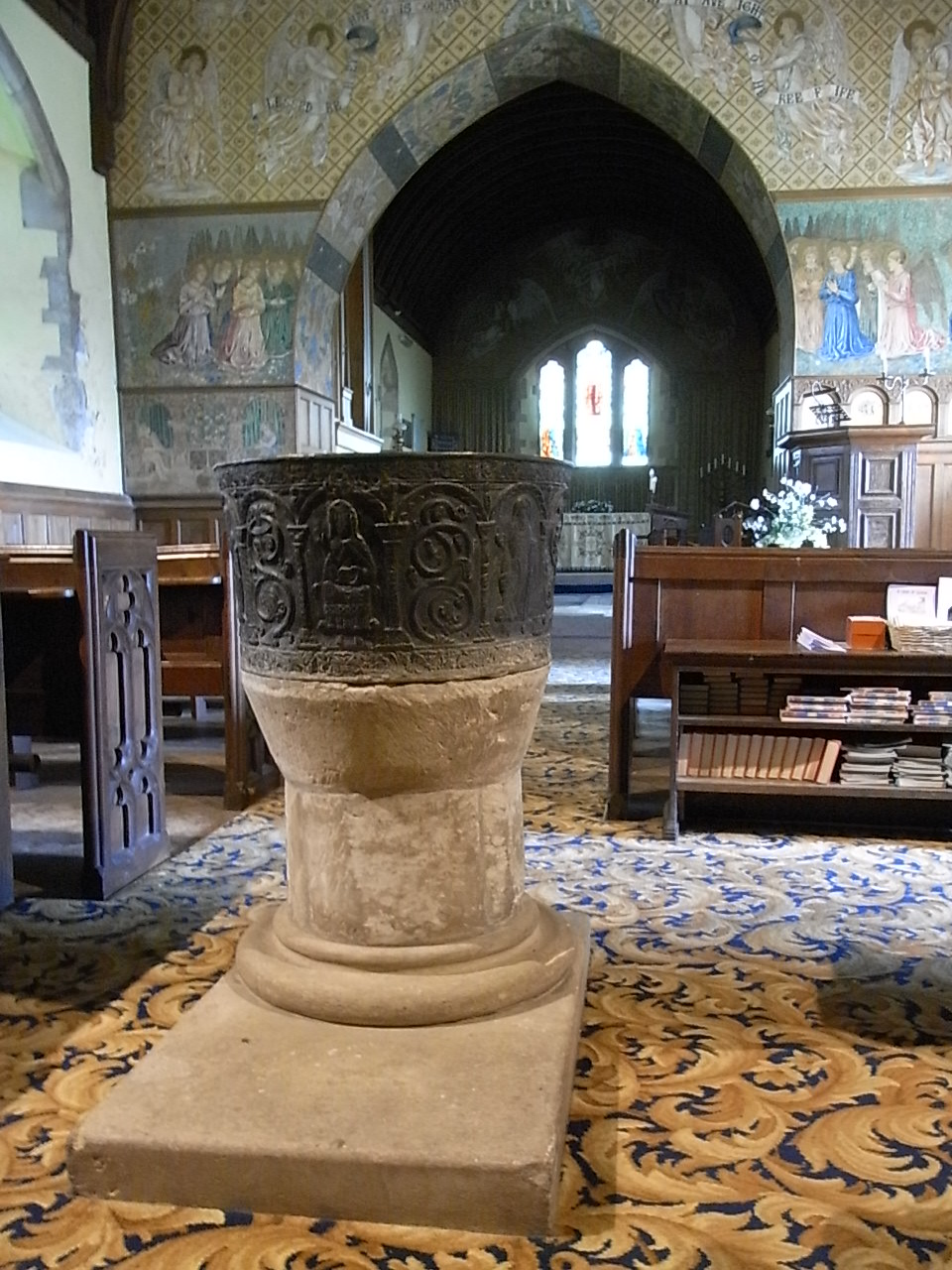
Leaden baptismal font, late 11th century, St Anne's Church, Siston

Due to Maurice having been in wardship, a full record of his birth and baptism is provided in the record of his proof of age inquisition dated 22 September 1431 at Tetbury, Glos., in the presence of his warder Sir Edward Stradling:

John Motsont, aged 64 years and more, sworn and examined on the age of Maurice, swears that he was born at Siston, baptised in the church there, and was 22 (21?) years of age and more on 29th (21st?) Sept. last. He knows because he met the godfathers and godmother of Maurice by the church on the day of the baptism. They told him about the birth of Maurice, and he was overjoyed. Thomas Reome, 54 and more, knows because Elizabeth his mother stood as godmother to Maurice, and Thomas was there too on the day that Maurice was baptised. John Born, 60 and more, held a torch in the church during Maurice's baptism. Richard Williams, 70 and more, was there and saw John Blount, godfather of Maurice, give him a piece of silver with a cover on the day of the baptism, and give 6s. & 8d. To the nurse. Walter Dore, 53 and more, knows because William his son was born & baptised on the same day that Maurice was baptised. Edward Benet, 44 and more, was then in service to Gilbert Denys, father of Maurice, in the office of butler, and carried a silver pot of wine to the church for the godfathers and godmother of Maurice after the baptism. John Seymour, 49 and more, gave Katherine his daughter in marriage to John Pynchepole on the day that Maurice was baptised and in the same church. John Felde, 72 and more, carried a basin and ewer from the manor to the church. He provided water for the godfathers and godmother of Maurice to wash their hands after he was raised from the font. Philip Fermer, 60 and more, knows because Robert his son celebrated his first mass in the same church on the day that Maurice was baptised. John Kyngton, 60 and more, knows because William his son was born on the same day that Maurice was baptised. John Stafford, 55 and more, was in the church when Maurice was baptised, and saw John Grevell, godfather of Maurice, give him a silver goblet with a cover immediately after the baptism, and 6s. & 8d. To the nurse. John Thorndon, 57 and more, carried a torch in front of Maurice from the manor of Siston to the church on the day that he was baptised, and held it during the baptism.

== Wardship ==
Maurice was aged 10 (or possibly 14) on the death of his father in 1422, and therefore deemed a minor, not having achieved his majority of 21. The Inquisition post mortem of Gilbert Denys, dated at Chipping Sodbury, 25 June 1422, stated "Maurice Denys is his son and next heir, and he is of the age of 14 years and more". As Sir Gilbert Denys was a tenant-in-chief of the king in respect of the manor of Alveston, Glos., Maurice became a ward of the crown. In May 1422 Humphrey, Duke of Gloucester had been appointed keeper of the realm whilst King Henry V was away in France. In August 1422 the dying king appointed Gloucester as regent of England. Gilbert Denys had been in the service of John of Gaunt, Duke of Lancaster, and had appointed the latter's son Henry Beaufort, Bishop of Winchester as one of the two overseers of his will. It was possibly at the request of Beaufort, influential on the regency council, that the wardship of Maurice was awarded to Sir Edward Stradling of St Donat's Castle, Glamorgan, who was then about to marry Beaufort's illegitimate daughter by Alice FitzAlan. Gilbert Denys had been born in Glamorgan and had known Edward Stradling well, having quitclaimed his interests in land in Glamorgan to Stradling following the extensive redistributions of land consequent on the death of Sir Lawrence Berkerolles of Coity Castle in 1411. The Fine Rolls contain the following entry dated 17 July 1422:

Commitment to Edward Stradlyng, chivaler, by mainprise of William Oldhalle of the county of Norfolk and William Stradlyng of the county of Somerset, of the keeping of 2/3rds of all the lands, and 2/3rds of the hundred of Langeley, co. Gloucester, late of Gilbert Denys, chivaler, who held of the king in chief by knight-service on the day of his death, the same being in the king's hand by the death of Gilbert and by reason of the minority of Maurice his son and heir. Th hold the same from Michaelmas next until the lawful age of the said heir, and so from heir to heir until one of them shall have attained full age, rendering the extent thereof, or as much as may be agreed upon by himself and the treasurer, yearly at Easter and Michaelmas equally, maintaining all houses, enclosures and buildings, and supporting all other charges incumbent on the said 2/3rds of the lands and hundred aforesaid. By bill of the treasurer.

Stradling later agreed with the treasurer on the sum of 20 marks per annum as the price of his wardship of Maurice.

== Remarriage of mother ==
Margaret Russell, mother of Maurice Denys, retained on the death of Gilbert Denys as her customary dower 1/3rd of his lands for life. Thus Edward Stradling had available only the remaining 2/3rds. as his wardship lands. Yet he exerted his influence over the widow Margaret, who had been urged not to remarry but rather to take a vow of chastity in the will of her husband, by procuring her as wife for his young nephew John Kemys from Wentloog, South Wales. Thus the following entry is recorded in the Patent Rolls, dated at Westminster, 12 December 1422, only 7 months after Gilbert Denys's death:

Licence for Margaret late the wife of Gilbert Denys, knight, tenant-in-chief of Henry V, to marry John Kemmes, esquire

This meant that Kemeys himself acquired jure uxoris a life interest in the dower 1/3 of the Denys lands. As Kemeys did not die until 1477, 11 years after Maurice Denys's death, Maurice never lived to enjoy his entire patrimony. It appears that Margaret and John Kemeys resided at Siston, the place of Maurice's birth and the principal Denys manor, which forced Maurice to reside at Alveston, or possibly near to it at Olveston Court, which his father had held at his death from the Bishop of Bath & Wells. Not only did Edward Stradling obtain Margaret as a wife for his nephew, but he had previously obtained Joan Dauntsey, the young 2nd wife and widow of her father, Sir Maurice Russell (d. 1416), as wife for his uncle Sir John Stradling, as the following entry in the Patent Rolls, dated 8 July 1418 at Waltham, records:

Pardon, for 40 marks paid in the hanaper, to John Stradlyng, chivaler, and Joan late the wife of Maurice Russell, chivaler, tenant-in-chief, of their trespass in intermarrying without licence.

Joan had as her dowry 1/3rd of the substantial lands of Maurice Russell, and later unexpectedly became the heiress of her brother regarding the Dauntsey lands in Wiltshire.

== Attains majority ==
The Close Rolls, 10 Henry VI, record the following writ, dated 20 November 1431:

To the escheator in Gloucestershire and the march of Wales adjacent. Order to give Maurice Denys, son and heir of Gilbert Denys, knight, seisin of his father's lands, as he has proved his age before the escheator, and the king has taken his fealty, and for 13s. 4d. Paid in the hanaper has respited his homage until Whitsuntide next.

== First marriage ==
Sir Edward Stradling had obtained not only the wardship of Maurice but also his marriage. He exercised this right by marrying him off to his daughter, Katherine Stradling, who was thus provided with a husband of ample means. Yet Katherine it appears died very soon after giving birth in about 1437 to the couple's first son, Sir Walter Denys (c. 1437–1505).

== Second marriage ==
Maurice married secondly, before 1 November 1437, Alice Poyntz, daughter of Nicholas Poyntz of Iron Acton, Glos. By his second wife Elizabeth Hussey, daughter of Henry Hussey of Sussex. The family of Poyntz was prominent in the Gloucestershire gentry, of ancient lineage, and their principal manor of Iron Acton lay between the Denys manors of Siston and Alveston. Maurice had 8 children by Alice Poyntz, including Hugh Denys (d. 1511), groom of the stool to King Henry VII (1485–1509).

== Entails lands ==
The following settlement, apparently on the marriage of Maurice and Alice Poyntz, was licensed on 1 November 1437, as recorded in the Patent Rolls:

Licence, for 4 marks paid in the hanaper, for Maurice Denys to enfeoff John Fort, Simon Cotesbroke, John Burnell the younger and John Pakker of Iron Acton, and their heirs, of two parts (i.e. 2/3rds) of the manors of Alveston and Erdecote (i.e. Earthcott Green), with the hundred and frankpledge of Langele, (i.e. Langley) co. Gloucester, held in chief, and of the remainder of the third part of the premises, likewise held in chief, after the death of Margaret, the wife of John Kemys, who with her said husband, holds the same in dower. Licence also for the said feoffees, after having had seisin and received the attornment of the said John Kemys and Margaret to refeoff the said Maurice and Alice, his wife, and the heirs of their bodies of the said two parts, and to grant them the said remainder under the same entail, with remainder to the right heirs of the said Maurice.

Such entails were usual and required by the father of the bride to ensure that his daughter and her progeny obtained title to the estate of the proposed husband. Since Sir Walter Denys eventually obtained Alveston, Earthcott Green and Langeley hundred, it would seem that he must have been the heir of the body of Alice Poyntz, not of Katherine Stradling, as the pedigree in the 1623 Visitation of Gloucestershire shows. However, it appears the entail was never finalised, as in 1466 Maurice and Alice obtain licence again to settle the same manors on feoffees, which power they would not have had if the manors had been held by feoffees since 1437. Also, the settlement of 1466, shortly before Maurice's death, does not give remainder to the heirs of the body of Alice, which might explain how Sir Walter Denys obtained the manors. The 1466 settlement is recorded in the Patent Rolls, dated at Westminster, 12 October 1466:

Licence, for 33s. 4d. Paid in the hanaper, for Maurice Denys, esquire, and Alice his wife to grant the manors of Alleweston and Erthecote and the hundreds of Langley and Alleweston, co. Gloucester, held in chief, to Humphrey Poyntz and Thomas Lymeryk, and for the latter to regrant the same to the said Maurice and Alice for life, with remainder to the heirs of the body of Maurice and final remainder to his right heirs.

== Death and burial ==
Maurice died in 1466 and was buried in the chancel of Olveston Church as the Denys brass of 1505 in that church states.

== Denys monumental brass, 1505, Olveston Church ==
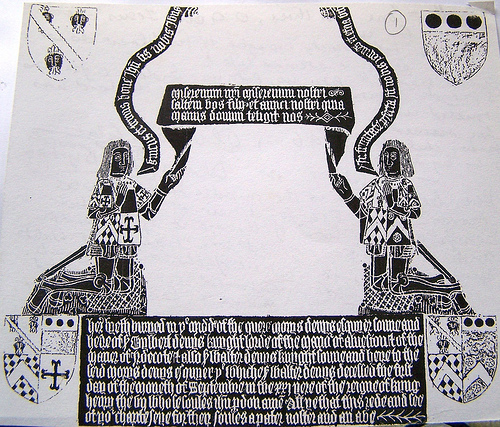

=== Identification of Armourials ===
The armourials are as follows: Top left (dexter) (1st) Quarter (to bearer's R, viewer's L)): Denys; Top right: (sinister) Russell. Bottom L (3rd. Q): 1st: Denys; 2nd: Russell; 3rd: Gorges; 4th: a cross moline or fer-de-moline, is for the family of Eleanor Ferre, da. of Sir John Ferre, of Tothill, Lincs., an heiress of the Gorges family. (Raymond Gorges, History of the Family of Gorges, Boston USA, 1944; The arms of Sir Guy Ferre (d. 1323), his nephew, can be seen above the pedestrian gateway of Butley Priory (of which he held the advowson) where the fer de moline of his canting arms is shown in the form of a cross moline). Bottom R (4th. Q): 1st: Denys; 2nd: Russell; 3rd: Gorges; 4th: prob.Danvers. Armorials repeated on tabard fronts and sleeves. Morys Denys the father to L in Dexter position of honour. Russell was his heiress-mother, Gorges a former Russell heiress. On the R. is Sir Walter Denys, the son, with the arms of his co-heiress 2nd. wife, Agnes Danvers, in the 4th. Q.

=== Blazoning of Armorials ===
The arms of Denys are: Gules, three leopard's faces or jessant-de-lys azure, over all a bend engrailed of the last. The Denys arms blazoned with these tinctures survive earliest in British Library Add.MS 45131, f. 54, a 1509 drawing of Hugh Denys (d. 1511) at the deathbed of Henry VII. The armourials are the arms of Cantilupe of Candleston Castle, Glamorgan, probably granted as "arms of patronage" to their feudal officials or tenants the Denys's, differenced by the imposition of a bend engrailled, probably before 1258. Cantilupe arms, reversed for difference, are still borne as the official arms of the See of Hereford, in honour of St. Thomas de Cantilupe, Bishop of Hereford, canonised in 1320. The Denys arms are a rare ancient exception to the rule of tincture "no colour on colour or metal on metal" propounded by John Gibbon in his 1682 Introductio ad Latinam Blasoniam, in which he lists (pp. 150–1) some exceptions, including Denys: "Now for my reader's diversion and delight I will insert what hath fallen under my observation". The Denys arms are also shown sculpted on the wings of the nearby Tudor mansion Siston Court, built by Sir Maurice Denys (d.1563), great-grandson of Maurice Denys (d. 1466), yet there they have been altered to a neater composition, with the bend passing between the leopards' faces, and the latter composition was also adopted by the Denys family of Pucklechurch, lords of that manor until 1701.

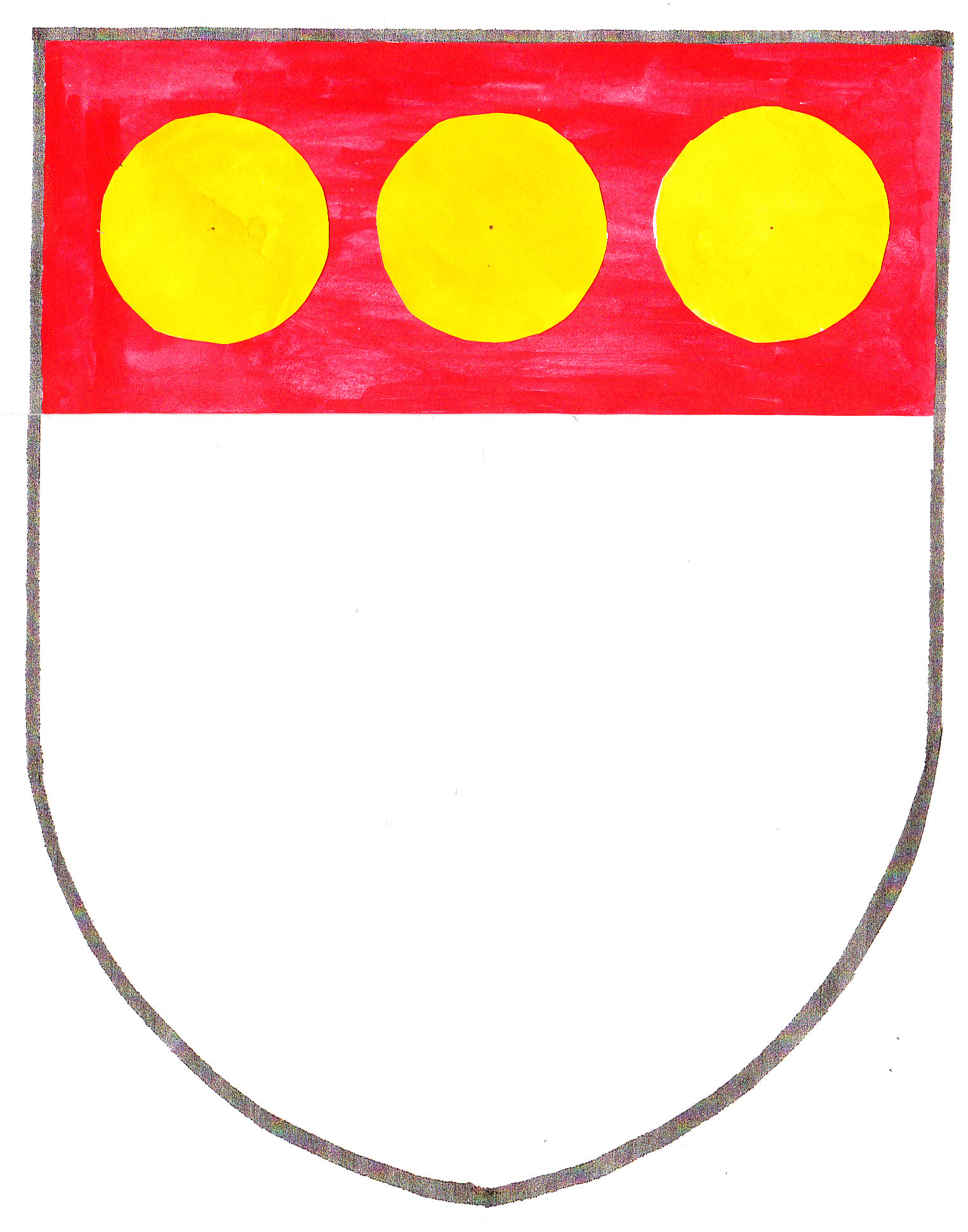
Arms of Russell

Russell: (of Kingston Russell, Dorset & Dyrham, Glos.) Sir Gilbert Denys of Siston had married c. 1404, as his 2nd wife, Margaret Russell, eldest da. and later co-heiress of Sir Morys Russell of Dyrham. Argent, on a chief gules 3 bezants. She was the mother of Morys Denys. (Bezants are Byzantine gold coins, thought to have been very popular with the Crusaders who plundered Constantinople in 1204, not having received the previously agreed funding from the Emperor.)

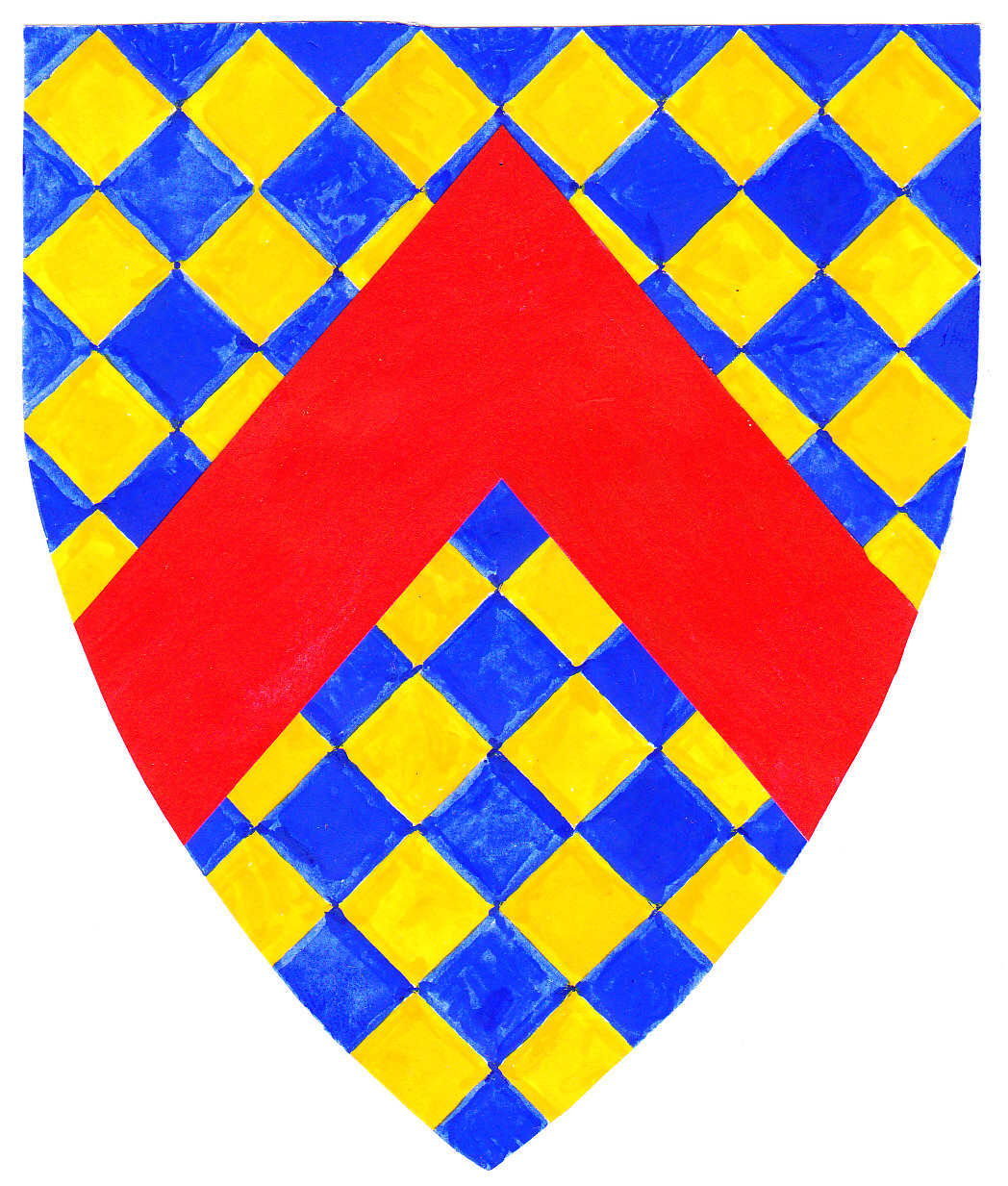
"Gorges Modern" arms

Gorges (of Knighton, Isle of Wight; Wraxall, Somerset; Bradpole, Dorset). Sir Theobald I Russell (d. 1341) of Kingston Russell, Dorset, grandfather of Sir Maurice Russell of Dyrham, had been the ward of Sir Ralph III de Gorges, 1st Baron Gorges (d. 1324), and had been married-off by his warder to his 2nd. daughter Eleanor de Gorges. Eleanor's 3rd son Theobald II Russell inherited from his uncle Ralph IV de Gorges (d. 1331), 2nd Baron, the former Gorges estates and changed his name to "Gorges", adopting their arms, apparently as part of the arrangement. The armorials of Gorges are of interest. They were originally canting arms of a Gurges, which is Latin for whirlpool, then c. 1300 were changed voluntarily to lozengy, or and azure, in recognition of the de Morvilles, ancestors of the Gorges. Yet there was a celebrated dispute in 1347 (see Warbelton v. Gorges) when these lozengy arms were claimed by John de Warbelton against Theobald II Russell "de Gorges" and a court of honour adjudged the arms to Warbelton. Instead of adopting completely new arms, Theobald merely added a red chevron as a difference, blazoned Lozengy or and azure, a chevron gules. These arms are known as "Gorges Modern". The Denys family should logically have quartered the undifferenced arms of their ancestor Ralph III de Gorges, not those of Theobald II Russell "de Gorges", their cousin, unless as appears to have been the case, it was customary to apply such heraldic judgements retrospectively.

Danvers (of Cothorpe, Oxon.) Morys Denys's 2nd wife, and Sir Walter's mother, was Agnes Danvers, co-heiress of Sir Robert Danvers (d. 1467), Chief Justice of the Common Pleas. The arms blazoned in the 4th. Q. on Sir Walter's tabard appear as A chevron between 3 roses, yet the arms given by Burkes 1884 for this family are quite different Argent, on a bend gules 3 martlets (house martens) vert legged or. The arms of Danvers of Warwick however are closer to those depicted here: Gules, a chevron between 3 mullets (stars) of 6 points or.

Conclusion: The monumental brass is likely to have been erected well after the date of the interment, so if indeed there are errors on the part of the engraver, or in the instructions given him, it may have been felt acceptable to let the matter rest, rather than incur considerable expense in having it remade. On the other hand, if the arms are all correct, there are lacunae in the literature and official records of Denys family history.

=== Transcription of Gothic Text ===
Below
Her lyeth buryed in ye midde. of the quere (i.e. choir/chancel) Morys Denys esquyer sonne and here of sir Gylbert Denys knyght lorde of the maner of Alveston & of the maner of Irdecote (i.e. Earthcott Green) & also sir walter Denys knyght sonne and here to the seid morys denys esquyer ye. whiche sir walter denys decessed the first day of the moneth of Septembre in the xxi yere of the reigne of kyng henry the vii (i.e. 1506) whose soules Jhesu pardon amen. All ye that this rede and see of yor. charitie seye for their soules a pater noster and an ave (i.e. Hail Mary).

On banner above
Miseremini mei miseremini nostri saltem vos filii et amici nostri quia manus domini tetigit nos. (Be ye all pitiful of me, be ye all pitiful of us, at the least ye our sons and friends, because the hand of the Lord hath touched us)(Job 19:21, altered)

On banner from mouth of Morys
Unicus et trinus bone jhesu sis nobis Jesus (One and Three o good Jesus, you are to us Jesus)

On banner from mouth of Sir Walter
In trinitate perfecta sit nobis requies et eterna vita(In the perfected Trinity may there become to us rest and eternal life)

== Sources ==
- Visitation of the County of Gloucester 1623, ed Sir John Maclean, London, 1885
- Richardson, Douglas. Plantagenet Ancestry, 2004.
- Roberts, Gary Boyd. The Royal Descents of 500 Immigrants to the American Colonies Or the United States, Baltimore USA, 1993, pp. 204–206, Denys.
