= Gilbert Denys =

Sir Gilbert Denys (c. 1350–1422) of Siston, Gloucestershire, was a soldier, and later an administrator. He was knighted by January 1385, and was twice knight of the shire for Gloucestershire constituency, in 1390 and 1395 and served as Sheriff of Gloucestershire 1393-4. He founded the family which provided more Sheriffs of Gloucestershire than any other.

== Early life ==
Gilbert Denys was probably born in about 1350 in Glamorgan, South Wales, probably the son of John Denys of Waterton, in the lordship of Coity. The latter is referred to as Johan Denys de Watirton in a charter of 1379 being leased land by Margam Abbey at Bonvilston during the wardship of John Norreis, son and heir of John Norreis of Lachecastel. In 1415 Sir Gilbert Denys is recorded as renting land in Waterton from the late Lord of Coity, Sir Roger Berkerolles. The Denys family are recorded in ancient Glamorgan charters, the earliest mention being in 1258, when Willelmo le Denys witnessed a charter effecting an exchange by Gilbert de Turberville, Lord of Coity, of lands in Newcastle, Glamorgan, with Margam Abbey. The Glamorgan antiquarian Clark (d.1898), supported by the Denys pedigree in the "Golden Grove Book" believed this William Denys to have originated in Gloucestershire and to have married a Turberville.

== First marriage to Margaret Corbet ==
In 1379, Denys secured the hand in marriage of Margaret Corbet, a Gloucestershire heiress, thereby attaining wealth and influence. Margaret had been born a triplet in about 1352, and both her brothers had died young in succession, leaving her the sole heir of the large Corbet landholdings in Gloucestershire and elsewhere. John the eldest had died in 1370 and William in 1377. Their father William, husband of Emma Oddingseles, had died while his children were young, predeceasing his own father, Sir Peter Corbet (d.1362). The manors held by Sir Peter Corbet on his death in 1362, which descended to his grandchildren in succession, John, William and Margaret were as follows: Hope-juxta-Caus, Shropshire, a remnant manor from the great Corbet honour, or virtually autonomous lordship established under William I at Caus Castle. Lawrenny in Pembrokeshire, (held from the Carew family) remnant of the family's large Welsh holdings, most of which had been earlier settled on Corbet male lines. The Corbet lands in Gloucestershire were as follows: Siston, held from the Bishops of Bath and Wells, and Alveston and Earthcott Green, both held in chief from the King. The possession of these tenancies-in-chief meant that should they ever descend into the hands of a female heiress, the King could repossess them and install his own favoured tenant who would thenceforth owe royal knight service and would be obliged to become a local administrator of the royal government. Margaret had been married off to a Pembrokeshire man, William Wyriott of Orielton, probably with the intention of consolidating Lawrenny with the Wyriott lands. Yet in 1379, only two years after her brother William's death aged 25, her husband William Wyriott died also, leaving Margaret as a female tenant-in-chief, a very precarious position for her. She could only remarry by royal licence, effectively giving the King the right of veto over her free choice or she could relinquish her family manors to live with a husband of her choice, probably in relative poverty and social obscurity. Within a short time after Wyriott's death, Margaret had accepted Gilbert Denys as her husband. The two were contemporaries, and the marriage proved on a personal level to be successful, as Denys asked in his will to be buried next to Margaret. The marriage, like most of the period, is unlikely to have been the result of a romance but rather arranged by some powerful figure at Court who wished to see Denys rise in the world. Insufficient evidence exists to identify who this patron of Denys might have been, but pure speculation might suggest John of Gaunt.

== Early career ==
Denys's career had begun in the service of John of Gaunt, son of King Edward III, who as Duke of Lancaster was Lord of Ogmore Castle, 3 miles SW of Waterton. Although certainly an insignificant property within his vast holdings, Denys may have made a mark for himself serving at Ogmore and come to the Duke's notice. In May 1375, on behalf of the Duke, Denys had taken formal custody of the manors of Aberavon and Sully in Glamorgan, part of the holdings of the late Edward le Despencer, 1st Baron le Despencer, Lord of Glamorgan. In 1378 he took out letters of protection to join Gaunt's foreign expedition, no doubt in the expectation of sharing in its profits. In 1382 Denys's subsequent letters of protection were revoked 2 months after issue when Sir John Devereux, Captain of Calais, testified that he had still not crossed the Channel. His absence may have been due to a pregnancy of his wife. In 1384 he enlisted in the army about to sail for Portugal in the company of the Portuguese Chancellor, Fernand, Master of the Order of St. James of the Sword. Denys served on his first Royal Commission at home in 1389, as Sheriff for Gloucestershire in 1393/4, and twice served as Knight of the Shire in 1390 and 1395. In 1401 he was one of 5 men from Gloucestershire summoned to attend a great council in August 1401.

== Escapes murder plot ==
An indictment heard before the Court of Kings Bench in 1387 accused 3 persons of holding conventicles at Earlswood in the lordship of Lydney in order to plot the killing of Sir Gilbert Denys and John Poleyn. The 3 accused were Ralph Greyndour the younger, John Magot and John Chaunterell. Greyndour was an example of the curious mediaeval phenomenon of the gentleman bandit. The Greyndour clan dominated the sparsely populated and wild area of the Forest of Dean in western Gloucestershire bordering on the Welsh Marches. Ralph's kinsman was John Greyndour, lord of Mitcheldean, Littledean and Abenhall, all within the Forest of Dean. These 3 were also accused of plotting to kill Henry Warner, Nicholas More and Thomas de Berkeley of Berkeley when the latter came hunting in the forest with the king's licence. All 3 were acquitted of the charges.

== Holds Farm of Pucklechurch ==
The manor of Pucklechurch lies to the immediate north-east of Siston, and was held by the Bishop of Bath & Wells since 1275, when he had received it from Glastonbury Abbey. To save themselves the administrative burden of collecting all the rents within the manor, they farmed the manor to Gilbert Denys, that is to say gave him the right to keep all the rents he could collect in exchange for an annual one-off payment. This sum was set at £40, which must be assumed to represent about 70% of the total rents due, therefore estimated at £57. Thus the See saved itself more than £17 per annum in its admin. expenses by farming it to Denys, who for his outlay of £40 may have collected £51 in rents, i.e. 90%, depending on how forceful he was inclined to be. That would represent a gross return to him of 28%. One must assume that Denys would have been willing to pay more than anyone else for the privilege, already holding next-door Siston, making for convenient administration. Thus in the Communar's Accounts of the See of Bath and Wells the following entries are recorded:

- 1400–01 Received from Gilbert Denys, knt, for farm of Pokelchurch £40
- 1400–01 Paid to servant of Sir Gilbert Denys for venison from Pokelchurch for the canons 2s
- 1407/8 Received from Sir Gilbert Denys, farmer of the church at Pucklechurch £40
- 1407/9 Expenses of the steward about the agreement with Sir Gilbert Denys and on other occasions £1 3s 2d.
- 1407/9 Received from Gilbert Denys for wood at Crotesmor £5 13s 4d
- 1408/9 Received from Sir Gilbert Denys for the farm of Pucklechurch, £5 being remitted for the first term £35
- 1414–18 Expenses of holding a court at Pucklechurch and treating with Gilbert Denys at Sixton (Siston) and Olvyston and with Abbatiston (Abson?) parish £1 1s 5½d
- 1414–18 Expenses: Sir Gilbert Denys £2 and his bailiff 3s 4d and his entertainment for horses and men at Simon Bayly's (11s 8d) £2 15s
- 1414–18 Expenses hire of 2 horses at Wells and holding a court at Pucklechurch 1s 11d
- 1414–18 Rec'd from the bailiff of Pucklechurch, rent and perquisites of court £1 7s 5d
- 1417–18 Received from Sir Gilbert Denys for the farm of Pucklechurch £40
- 1417–18 Expenses at Pucklechurch, with horse hire, about tithes in Pucklechurch, Abbatiston (Abson?) and Westleigh (Westerleigh?) and arranging with Gilbert Denys £1 8s 1d

It would seem that it was a pleasant day out for a couple of the canons or friars of Wells to hire horses and ride over to talk business with Denys, perhaps an excuse to enjoy some all-expenses paid entertainment. It appears that Denys held the farm until his death in 1422, although records are not available to confirm this. A cadet branch of the Denys family became lords of the manor of Pucklechurch, probably in the 16th century, and continuing until the death of William Dennis in 1701, last of the male line.

== Joins Retinue of Earl of Stafford ==
Following Gaunt's death in 1399, Denys joined the retinue of Edmund, Earl of Stafford(d.1403), and probably fought with the Earl in Henry IV's campaign against the Scots in 1400. In 1403 he was appointed by the King as constable of the late Earl of Stafford's Newport Castle, Monmouth, in charge of 80 archers and 40 lances, specifically to resist the rebellion of Glendower. Having been discouraged from attacking nearby Chepstow Castle, a far larger fortification, Glendower turned his force on Newport, which Denys's force was clearly unable to resist, for the castle was sacked. He must have returned across the Bristol Channel to Gloucestershire as on 7th. Oct in the same year the King issued the following order preserved in the Patent Rolls:

Commission to Maurice Russell, Gilbert Dynys, John Rolves and John Harsefelde to assemble all the able fencible men, footmen and horsemen, of the hundreds of Barton Regis by Bristol, Hembury, Pokelchurche, Thornbury, Grymboldesasshe, Berkeley and Whiston and bring them sufficiently armed to the town of Chepstowe by Thursday next at the latest to go with the King or his lieutenant to Wales to resist the rebels bringing with them victuals for 4 days and to take horses from those who have them who cannot labour and deliver them to those who can labour but lack horses. By K.

Three days later, on 10th. Oct. 1403 Denys and Edward, Lord Charlton were granted full powers to pardon any rebels in the lordships of Usk, Caerleon and Trilleck who submitted to them. He continued to hold office at Newport as steward and sheriff, possibly owing these appointments to Ann, dowager countess of Stafford and her 3rd. Husband, Sir William Bourchier. In 1418 Denys was sheriff of the Marcher Lordship of Gwynllwg (Wentloog), the caput of which was Newport.

== Marriages to Joan Kemeys and Margaret Russell ==
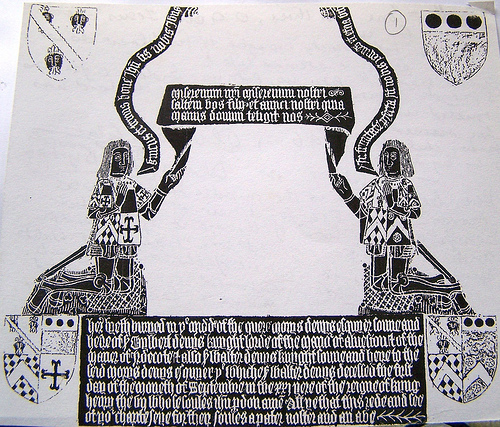
Rubbing from Denys monumental brass, 1506, Olveston Church. Kneeling at left, Maurice Denys (d.1466), son and heir of Sir Gilbert. Sir Walter Denys(d.1506), son of Maurice, to R. The Denys paternal armorials are blazoned at top left: 3 leopards' faces jessant-de-lis overall a bend engrailled

Margaret Corbet died in 1398, having produced no male heir, only a daughter, Joan, who married Thomas Gamage and was old enough by 1422 to serve as executrix of her father's will. It is thought by some historians that Denys then married Joan Kemeys, the widow of Jenkin ap Dafydd of Grossmont, and second daughter of Jenkin de Kemeys by Jenet verch Jevan ap Lleison, patriarch of the Began line of the Glamorganshire de Kemeys family. She is possibly the mother of Matilda Denys, who would later marry the younger of the two contemporary men named Thomas Gamage, the son of William Gamage (1381-1419) and Mary de Rodborough, born in 1408, heir to Coity in Glamorgan and possibly the nephew of the Thomas Gamage who married Matilda's elder half-sister Joan [see below].

There is no doubt as to the identity of Denys's next bride. Before 1408 he married Margaret Russell, elder daughter of his near neighbour Sir Maurice Russell of Dyrham. The marriage was socially advantageous for Denys as the Russells were wealthy and well established in Gloucestershire, yet little prospect existed at the time of the marriage of financial advancement as Maurice Russell then had an 8-year-old heir, Thomas, produced by his young second wife Joan Dauntsey. Yet after Denys's death, Thomas Russell died in 1432, leaving an infant child who also died, leaving the Russell inheritance to Margaret, by then remarried to John Kemeys, and Isabel her sister. Thus Maurice Denys (1410–1466) the son and heir of Denys and Margaret Russell, and his Denys descendants, became heirs to half the Russell lands. According to the Heralds' Visitation of Glos. op.cit., Denys had by Margaret Russell the following children:

- Maurice, eldest son and heir.

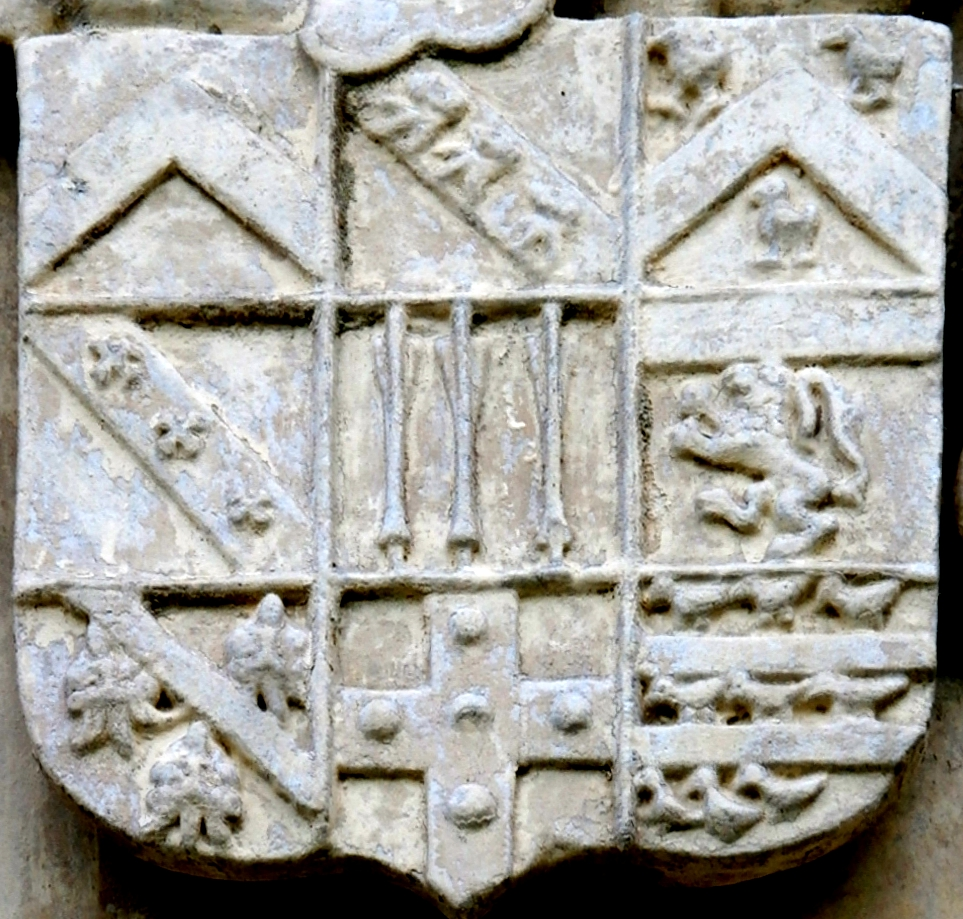
16th century relief-sculpted stone escutcheon of 9 quarters over main entrance to courtyard of Great Fulford House, Devon: *1: Gules, a chevron argent (Fulford) *7: Gules, three leopard's faces or jessant-de-lys azure over all a bend engrailed azure (Denys of Glamorgan and of Siston, Gloucestershire) *8: Ermine, on a cross gules five bezants (St Aubyn of Combe Raleigh) *9: Gules, two bars between nine martlets argent 3, 3, 3 (Chalons of Challonsleigh)

- William Denys, second son, who according to the Devon historian Tristram Risdon (d.1640) married Joan St Aubyn (born 1411), widow of Otto Bodrugan (from the prominent Cornish family) and one of the two daughters and co-heiresses of John St Aubyn, of Combe Raleigh in Devon. William Denys had by her a single daughter and sole heiress to Combe Raleigh, Alice Denys, who married John Bonville, the illegitimate son of the Devonshire magnate William Bonville, 1st Baron Bonville(c.1392/3-1461), of Shute, Devon, by his mistress, Elizabeth Kirkby. John Bonville and Alice Denys had six daughters and co-heiresses, one of whom, Joan Bonville, married William III Fulford (1476–1517) of Great Fulford in the parish of Dunsford in Devon. Risdon was well-versed in the history of the separate ancient family of Denys of Devon, which originated at Orleigh, near Bideford, with different arms to Denys of Glmorgan, and is thus unlikely to have been in error in identifying William as the "son of Sir Gilbert Dennis of Wales". This genealogy is confirmed by the surviving 16th century stone-sculpted heraldic escutcheon over the entrance to the courtyard of Great Fulford, still occupied by the Fulford family in 2015, which shows in the 1st quarter the arms of Fulford and in the 7th quarter the jessant-de-lys arms of Denys of Glamorgan, in the 8th quarter the arms of St Aubyn (Argent, on a cross gules five bezants), an heiress of Denys, and in the 9th and last quarter the arms of Chalons (Gules, two bars between nine birds argent 3,3,3) an heiress of St Aubyn. These arms of Denys of Glamorgan are also shown in the Fulford Chapel in Dunsford Church.
- Richard (a priest).
- Margaret (b. about 1413, a nun at Lacock Abbey)

The Dictionary of Welsh Biography entry by Evan David Jones for the family of Gamage mentions a daughter "Matilda Denys" who married Thomas Gamage(b.1408), son and heir of William Gamage(d.1419), Denys's co-besieger of Coity, by Mary, daughter of Sir Thomas Rodborough. Thomas became a ward of the Earl of Worcester in 1421, following his father's death. There is apparently some confusion here with Joan, Denys's daughter and executrix by Margaret Corbet, who would however have been too old to be the wife of this Thomas Gamage(b.1408) as she acted as Denys's executrix in 1422, and would then have been an adult. However a Matilda Denys is mentioned in the Calendar of the Martyrologue of St. Augustine's Abbey, Bristol, as having died in October 1422:

"Domina Matilda Denys, quae obiit die... Octobris, anno Christi 1422"

== Serves under Lord Berkeley ==
In 1404 Denys served at sea in a fleet under the command of Thomas de Berkeley, 5th Baron Berkeley(d.1417), Admiral of the West. It appears this may have involved action around the southern Wales coast in connection with quelling Glendower's revolt.

== Appointed feoffee of Lord Berkeley ==
In 1417 he was enfeoffed at Berkeley Castle by Lord Berkeley, shortly before his death, as one of the feoffees (i.e. trustees) of his estates, as the catalogue entry for charter number 581 preserved in the muniments at Berkeley Castle records:

"Feoffment by Thomas, Lord Berkeley, Knt, to Walter Poole, Gilbert Denys, Knts,, Thomas Knolles, citizen of London, Thomas Rugge, John Grevell, Robert Greyndour and Thomas Sergeant, esquires, of all the lands, reversions, and tenants' services in Berkeley, Wotton, Glou- cester, South Cerney, Cerneyeswike, Aure, Arlingham, and Horton, and in Berkeley and Bledislow Hundreds; in the city of London; in Portbury, Portishead, Weston, Bedminster, and in Bedminster and Portbury Hundreds, co. Somerset, and in Sharnecote and Chicklade, co. Wilts., together with the advowsons of St. Andrew's Church in Baynard's Castle, London, the advowsons of Chicklade, Portishead, and Walton, and the patronage and advowson of St. Mary's Abbey of Kingswood. Witnesses : Thomas

FitzNicoll, John Pauncefoot, Knights; Robert Poyntz, Edmund Bassett, Thomas Kendale. Datum ad Berkeley, Thursday, Feast of the Nativity of St. John the Baptist (24 June) 5 Hen. V. (1417). (With seal, broken)"

The City of London mansion of the Berkeleys was at Puddle Dock by Baynard's Castle. Thomas FitzNicholl, one of the witnesses, was many times MP for Gloucestershire, including in 1395 when he served jointly with Denys. Saul, N. states that such feoffees were likely to have been members of Lord Berkeley's retinue. This was a very significant position of trust assigned to Denys and others as Berkeley died leaving only a daughter and the succession to the vast Berkeley lands, including the castle itself, became a matter of much dispute amongst his possible heirs resulting in a series of feuds which led in 1470 to the last private battle fought on English soil at the Battle of Nibley Green, between Lord William Berkeley and Viscount Lisle, and there followed the longest dispute in English legal history, which did not end until 1609.

== Besieges Coity Castle ==
The de Turberville family held the lordship of Coity from c. 1092 to 1360, having been founded by Sir Payn de Turberville, one of the legendary Twelve Knights of Glamorgan of Robert FitzHamon, 1st. Lord of Glamorgan. Richard de Turberville died in 1384, leaving his 4 sisters as co-heiresses. Sarah had married William Gamage; Margaret had married Sir Richard Stackpole, whose da. Joan had married Sir Richard Verney; Agnes had married Sir John de la Bere of Weobly Castle, Gower; Catherine had married Sir Roger Berkerolles (d.1351), another descendant of one of the Twelve Knights of Glamorgan, of East Orchard, St. Athan. It was their son Sir Roger Berkerolles (d.1411) who succeeded to Coity, but clearly not with the approval of all concerned. His sister Wenllian had married Sir Edward Stradling of St. Donat's Castle. The tomb effigies of Catherine and Sir Roger can be seen in St. Athan's Church. The Berkerolles' claim to Coity ended on 18 October 1411, with the death of Sir Lawrence Berkerolles II, son of Sir Roger and Catherine. His heir was his 1st. cousin once removed, the minor Thomas de la Bere, son of John de la Bere deceased, son of Agnes Turberville (sister of Richard) and Sir John de la Bere. Thomas died as a minor on 28 October 1414. Coity briefly thereafter escheated to the King, under the hand Isabel Despenser, seemingly in the capacity of Lord of Glamorgan, wife of Richard de Beauchamp, Lord of Bergavenny, following which the lordship reverted to the de Turberville family through Sarah, the youngest sister of Richard de Turberville. Following Sir Roger's death there was much general re-shuffling of property interests in Glamorgan, for example with the Stradling family. Sarah's marriage to Sir William Gamage of Rogiet brought the estate into the Gamage family. The succession was not however easily achieved for in September 1412, their grandson, another William Gamage, assisted by Sir Gilbert Denys, raised "no moderate multitude of armed men" and besieged Coity for a month, trying to oust Lady Joan Verney, wife of Sir Richard Verney and daughter of Margaret de Turberville, who it seems had taken up residence to assert her own claim to Coity in the confusion following Berkerolles's death. The king called up a commission of his local tenants to raise the siege and called another one a month later. The pair ended up in the Tower of London for having taken the law into their own hands, from 19th. November 1412 until 3rd. June 1413, after the death of Henry IV. However their action nevertheless proved successful in enforcing the Gamage claim to Coity. Denys's eldest daughter Joan was the wife of a certain Thomas Gamage, as his will reveals, possibly brother of William. Another of Denys's daughters, Matilda, by his 2nd wife, married another Thomas Gamage, great grandson of William Gamage and Sarah Turberville, thereby becoming Lady of Coity on her husband's succession, producing a son & heir John Gamage. The Gamage family held Coity until 1584. The Corbet triplets, of some thereof became wards of a certain Gamage and it may have been this connection of Margaret Corbet which formed a common link between her and Gilbert Denys, who as a young man would have been known to the Gamage family in Glamorgan.

== Connection with Earl of Warwick ==
Richard Beauchamp, Earl of Warwick was married to a daughter of Lord Berkeley, and it is likely Denys was known to him. One of Denys's own feoffees was Robert Stanshaw, a retainer of Warwick's, and Denys witnessed a charter at Cardiff in May 1421 for Richard Beauchamp, a cousin of the Earl.

== Death and Burial ==
Denys's will was dated the Feast of St. Michael the Archangel (16 October 1421), and he died on 24 March 1422. His will is a very short and businesslike document. He requested to be buried in Siston Church, near his first wife Margaret Corbet. The fact that he had appointed his daughter Joan, "wife of Thomas Gamage" as his executrix to arrange this burial, suggests she must have been a daughter of Margaret Corbet, not of his second wife Margaret Russell. This supposition is strengthened by the fact she must have been an adult to be thus appointed, which would place her date of birth before Denys's 2nd. Marriage to Margaret Russell, c. 1408. He requested Margaret Russell to take a vow of chastity if she wished to inherit his moveable goods in addition to her customary dower of 1/3 of his real estate. She was however remarried within 7 months, possibly under pressure from Sir Edward Stradling of St. Donat's Castle, Glamorgan, who had obtained the wardship of Morys, her son and Denys's heir. Her new husband, much her junior, was John Kemeys of Began, Monmouth, the young nephew of Stradling. 5 years earlier Stradling's uncle, Sir John Stradling had married Joan Dauntsey, the young widow of Margaret's own father, Sir Morys Russell (d.1416). Sir Edward Stradling married his daughter Katherine to Morys his ward, and Katherine Stradling thereby became matriarch of the Denys line. Denys and Stradling were well known to each other in Glamorgan, and in 1421 Denys had made a quitclaim or General Release to Stradling of his interests in Glamorgan following the death of Sir Roger Berkerolles, Lord of Coity, when much re-shuffling of property occurred. Katherine's mother was Joan, the bastard daughter of Cardinal Henry Beaufort, Bishop of Winchester, and son of John of Gaunt. Denys must have been known to Beaufort since he named him one of the overseers of his will, together with Bishop Phillip Morgan of Worcester. It is possible that Stradling had obtained the wardship of Morys Denys through the influence of his father-in-law Beaufort, possibly as part of the marriage settlement, for in the next year, 1423, the marriage of Joan and Stradling took place. Morys was aged 12 in 1422, and the only son of his marriage to Katherine Stradling, Walter, was born in 1437, aging Katherine at just 14 when she became a mother. She seems to have died shortly thereafter as Morys then remarried to Alice Poyntz.

== Sources ==
- Roskell, J.S. (ed.) History of Parliament: House of Commons 1386–1421, London, 1992. Vol. 2, pp. 771–2, biography of Sir Gilbert Denys.
- Williams, W.R. Parliamentary History of Gloucestershire. p. 29.
- Saul, Nigel. Knights and Esquires: The Gloucestershire Gentry in the Fourteenth Century, Oxford, 1981. ISBN 9780198218838
- Rawcliffe, Carole. The Staffords, Earls of Stafford and Dukes of Buckingham, 1394–1521, Cambridge, 1978. p. 214. (In series Cambridge Studies in Mediaeval Life & Thought, 3rd. Series, No. 11)
- Rymer, (ed.). Foedera (orig.edition), vii,186
- Francis, George Grant (ed.) Original Charters & Materials for a History of Neath and its Abbey, Swansea, 1845.
- William Salt Archive Society, Stafford, xiv,264
- Scott-Thomson, Gladys. Two Centuries of Family History, London, 1930. pp. 326–7 (Russell pedigree)
- Clark, G.T. Limbus Patrum Morganiae et Glamorganiae: Being the Genealogies of the Older Families of the Lordship of Morgan and Glamorgan, 1886, pp. 381–382, Denys
- Golden Grove Book of Pedigrees, manuscript by anonymous author c. 1765, Carmarthenshire Archives. 2nd. part (G), Advenae of Glamorganshire, G 1026, p. 78, pedigree of Denys
- Visitation of the County of Gloucester Taken in the Year 1623 by Henry Chitty and John Phillipot, ed. Maclean, Sir John, London, 1885, pp. 49–53, "Dennis"
- Visitation by the Heralds in Wales, Transcribed and Edited by Michael Powell Siddons, Wales Herald Extraordinary, London, 1996, pp. 62–3, "Dennys"
