= John Gibbon (officer of arms) =

English officer of arms and genealogist

John Gibbon (1629–1718) was an English officer of arms, Bluemantle Pursuivant and known as a writer on heraldry and the politics of the Exclusion Crisis.

== Life ==
The eldest son of Robert Gibbon, a London draper and fourth son of Robert Gibbon of Rolvenden, Kent, and his wife Mary, daughter of Lionel Edgar of Framsden, Suffolk, he was born on 3 November 1629. On 11 December 1639 he was admitted a pupil of Merchant Taylors' School, then went to Jesus College, Cambridge, matriculating in 1645, but not taking a degree.

With royalist views, Gibbon led an itinerant life under the Commonwealth. On his father's death in 1643 he had inherited land in Kent, but it was of little value. He writes of time he spent at Allesborough in Worcestershire, in the house of Thomas Coventry, 2nd Baron Coventry, where he was employed as a domestic tutor.

Gibbon visited Europe as a soldier and a traveller, learned French and Spanish, and passed some time in Jersey. He crossed the Atlantic in 1657, and worked managing the Virginia estate of Richard Lee I. He took the body paint of Native Americans to be confirmation of heraldry as a human universal.

Shortly after the Restoration of 1660 Gibbon returned to England, and on 9 February 1665 moved into a house belonging to the senior brother in St. Katharine's Hospital, near the Tower of London, where he resided till 11 May 1701. He received a patent for the office of Bluemantle pursuivant at arms on 10 February 1668, through the influence of Sir William Dugdale, but was not actually created such until 25 May 1671. He was an uncomfortable colleague in the College of Arms, commenting on others in the margins of the library books. He was an assiduous astrologer; but was on good terms with Dugdale, Elias Ashmole, John Betts, and Nehemiah Grew.

Gibbon was a High Tory of the Exclusion Crisis, who wrote in support of James, Duke of York. After the Glorious Revolution, with some delay, he did swear the oath of allegiance to William III and Mary II. He died in the parish of St. Faith, London, on 2 August 1718 and was buried on 6 August in the church of St Mary Aldermary.

== Works ==
With his contemporaries Gibbon had a reputation as a writer on heraldry and genealogy rank. In 1682 he published at London Introductio ad Latinam Blasoniam. An Essay towards a more correct Blason in Latine than formerly hath been used. He also compiled from British and foreign authorities an account of the services rendered by heralds in former times, Heraldo-Memoriale published in abridged form by John Strype in his edition of John Stow's Survey, 1720.

On James, Duke of York's return from Flanders in 1679, Gibbon published an essay Dux bonis omnibus appellens, or The Swans Welcome. Another light piece was Day Fatality; or, some Observations of Days lucky and unlucky; concluding with some Remarks upon the fourteenth of October, the auspicious Birthday of his Royal Highness James, Duke of York, 1678, and again in 1679. It was reprinted by John Aubrey in his Miscellanies, with additions at the end by himself, and in the quarto editions of the Harleian Miscellany. A second impression appeared in 1686.

Gibbon's other political writings were:

- A Touch of the Times; or, two letters casually intercepted [London, 1679], against Henry Care, author of the Weekly Packet of Advice from Rome. He ridiculed Care in a pamphlet Flagellum Mercurii Antiducalis.
- Unio Dissidentium. Heir apparent and presumptive made one. By J. G., B.M., [London? 1680?].
- Edovardus Confessor redivivus ... in the sacred Majesty of King James the II.; being a Relation of the admirable and unexpected finding of a sacred relique of that pious prince, ... since worn sometimes by his present majesty. [anon.], London, 1688.

== Family ==
Gibbon married his wife Susannah in or soon after 1660. She was buried in St Mary Aldermary on 24 August 1704.

== Notes ==
Attribution

This article incorporates text from a publication now in the public domain: Stephen, Leslie, ed. (1890). "Gibbon, John". Dictionary of National Biography. Vol. 21. London: Smith, Elder & Co.
