= Maurice Russell, knight =

English landowner, administrator and politician (died 1416)

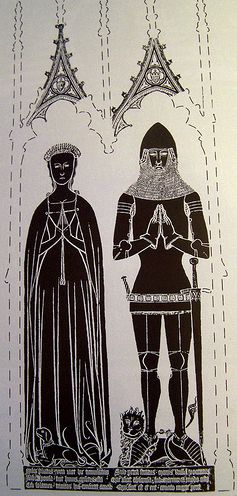
Sir Maurice Russell(1356–1416) and first wife Isabel Childrey. Rubbing from monumental brass, floor of the south chapel, St Peter's Church, Dyrham.

Sir Maurice Russell, JP (2 February 1356 – 27 June 1416) of Kingston Russell, Dorset and Dyrham, Glos. was an English gentleman and knight. He was a prominent member of the Gloucestershire gentry. He was the third but eldest surviving son and heir of Sir Ralph Russell (1319–1375) and his wife Alice (died 1388). He was knighted between June and December 1385 and served twice as Knight of the Shire for Gloucestershire in 1402 and 1404. He held the post of Sheriff of Gloucestershire four times, and was Coroner and Justice of the Peace, Tax Collector and Commissioner of Enquiry. His land holdings were extensive in Gloucestershire, Somerset, Dorset, Berkshire and Buckinghamshire. He was descended from an ancient line which can be traced back to 1210, which ended on the death of his son Thomas, from his second marriage, as a young man without male issue. Most of his estates, despite having been entailed, passed at his death into the families of his two daughters from his first marriage.

== Early life ==
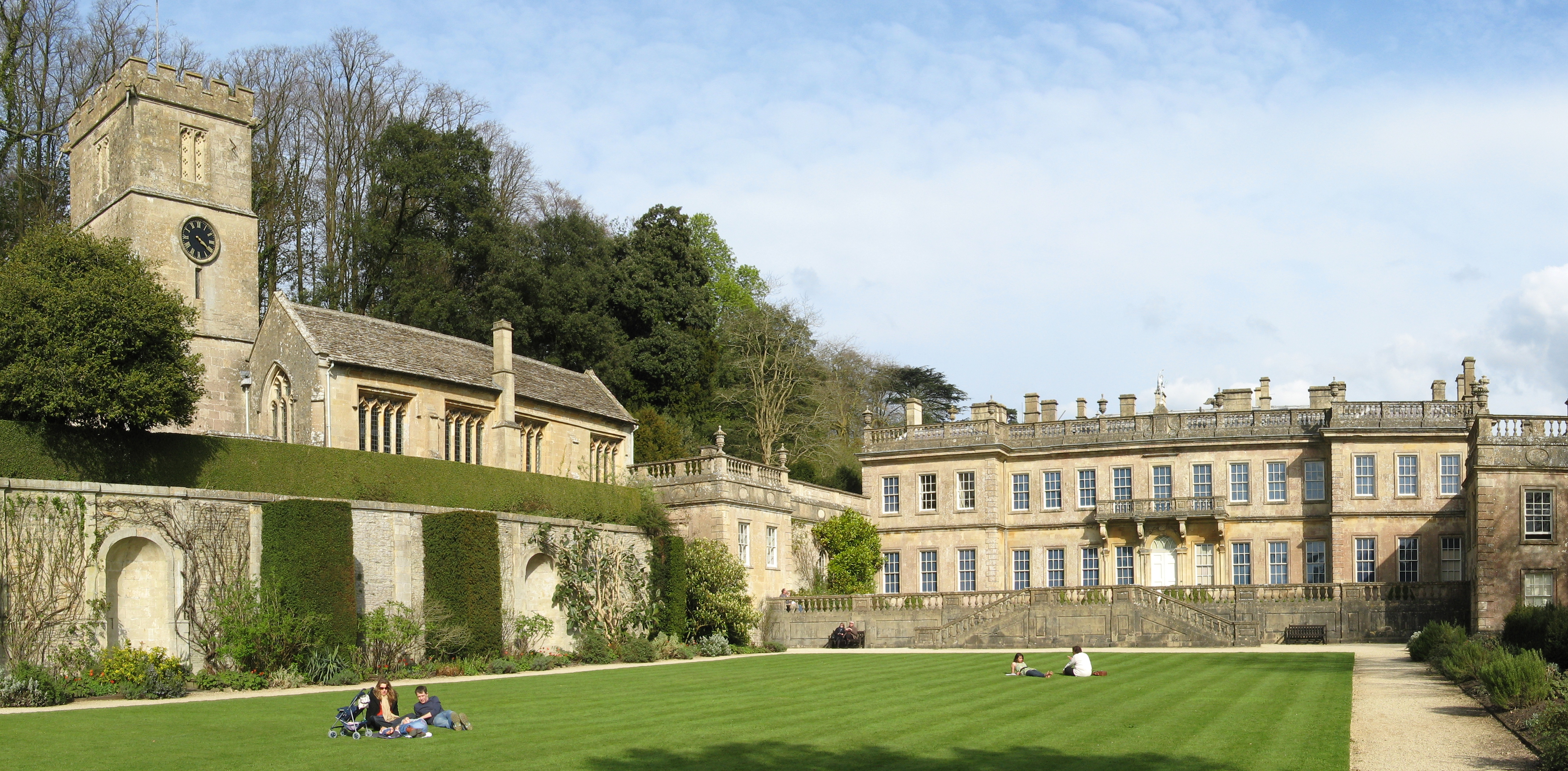
St Peter's Church, parish church of Dyrham. Next to it has stood for many centuries the manor house of Dyrham, the present incarnation of which, Dyrham Park (pictured), dates from the reign of William & Mary, and is thought to incorporate some of the structure of the ancient home of the Russells. In this church can be seen the funerary brass of Sir Maurice Russell and Isabel Childrey.

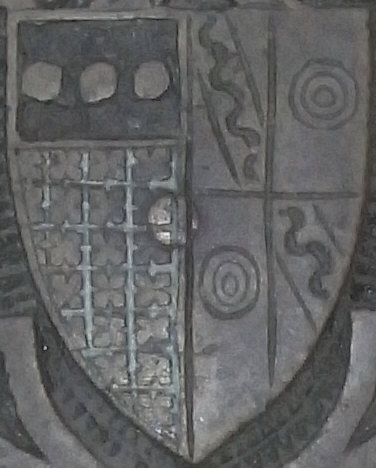
Arms of Russell impaling Childrey, detail from monumental brass of Sir Maurice Russell, Dyrham Church

Sir Maurice Russell was the son of Ralph Russell of the Isle of Wight and his wife Alice. When aged just 13 in June 1369, he married firstly to Isabel Childrey, daughter of Sir Edmund Childrey (or Chelrey; died 1372) of Frethornes Manor in the parish of Childrey, Berkshire. In 1388, Sir Maurice Russell sold his Berkshire manor of Upton "Russell" to John Latton, who sold it in 1401 to Thomas Childrey (c. 1350–1407), MP for Berkshire in 1390 and 1406, brother-in-law to Maurice Russell and steward of the estates of Bishop William of Wykeham of Winchester.

Maurice's father, Ralph Russell, died on 13 February 1375, while Maurice was still a minor, aged 19, two years from his majority. He was granted in wardship to Sir Robert Assheton (died 1384), his father's cousin, soon to be appointed Treasurer of the Exchequer.

Having reached his majority, in December 1377, Maurice took possession of his inheritance, following the early deaths of his two elder brothers, Theobald and John excepting the customary 1/3 dower share retained by his mother Alice, who died on 16 March 1388. In 1382, Maurice leased the reversion of Kingston Russell, due him on his mother's death, to Walter Clopton for 20 marks p.a. Maurice also had a sister, Alice, who married into the Haket family.

On the death of Sir Robert Assheton without issue, in 1384, Maurice Russell, his distant cousin via the Gorges family, inherited the former Gorges manors of Bradpole, and the hundred courts of Redhone and Beaminster Forum, in Dorset. Assheton's manor of Litton and Combe in Dorset were split, after some argument, between Russell and Sir Ralph Cheyne (died 1400), of Brooke in Westbury, Wilts., whose father, Sir William Cheyne, of Poyntington, Somerset, had married, as his second wife, Joan Gorges, the youngest daughter of the 1st Baron Gorges.

== Career ==
In December 1385, Maurice was appointed tax collector for Gloucestershire, and was again appointed in March 1388. That same year, as his first appointment, he sold the former Newmarch manor of Hardwick, Bucks. to William of Wykeham, Bishop of Winchester, for the purpose of the founding of New College, Oxford, and also granted the Bishop an annual rent of £10 from the manor of Aust, Glos., during his wife's lifetime. Later, in 1400, his brother-in-law Thomas Childrey would become steward to the estates of Wykeham. He also sold the ancient Russell manor of Allington to John Roger I (died 1441), of Bridport and Bryanston, Dorset.

Russell remained a very wealthy man as the assessments made in 1412 for the purposes of taxation make clear. His estates in Hampshire, Somerset, and Gloucestershire were then said to be severally worth £40 p.a., whilst those in Dorset apparently gave him an annual income of £122 5s, making a total, no doubt under-declared, of over £242.

In 1394, he was removed from the post of Coroner of Glos. for the reason that "He dwells not in the county", although most of his official positions related to that county. He made a loan of £40 to King Richard II in August 1397. He was clearly a supporter of King Richard, as he had married off his younger daughter to William le Scrope, 1st Earl of Wiltshire, one of the King's staunchest supporters, who was beheaded at Bristol, only 7 miles from Dyrham, by Henry Bolingbroke, in 1399.

Russell, however, continued to serve in official positions in Gloucestershire after the usurpation of the throne, in 1399, by Henry IV. Indeed, he served as Knight of the Shire in 1402 and 1404. In 1403, he was among the prominent figures of Gloucestershire commissioned by the new King to select the best fighting men of the region to join the royal army in fighting the Welsh rebels under Owen Glendower, and, in the same year, he was appointed feoffee, by Sir John Luttrell, of the Somerset manor of East Quantoxhead. In 1408, he was involved in a dispute, of unknown cause, with the influential Sir Walter Hungerford, as a result of which both men were required to enter into recognizances for 1,000 marks each as surety that they would abide by the award of the Chancellor Thomas Arundel, Archbishop of Canterbury.

Maurice also held a number of other Gloucestershire administraitive positions, as High Sheriff in 1390/1, 1395/6, 1400/1 and 1406/7, as Coroner from 1392 to 1394, appointed again before 1397, as Knight of the Shire and hence Member of Parliament for Gloucestershire in 1402 and 1404, and as Justice of the Peace from 1394 to 1407.

== Succession ==
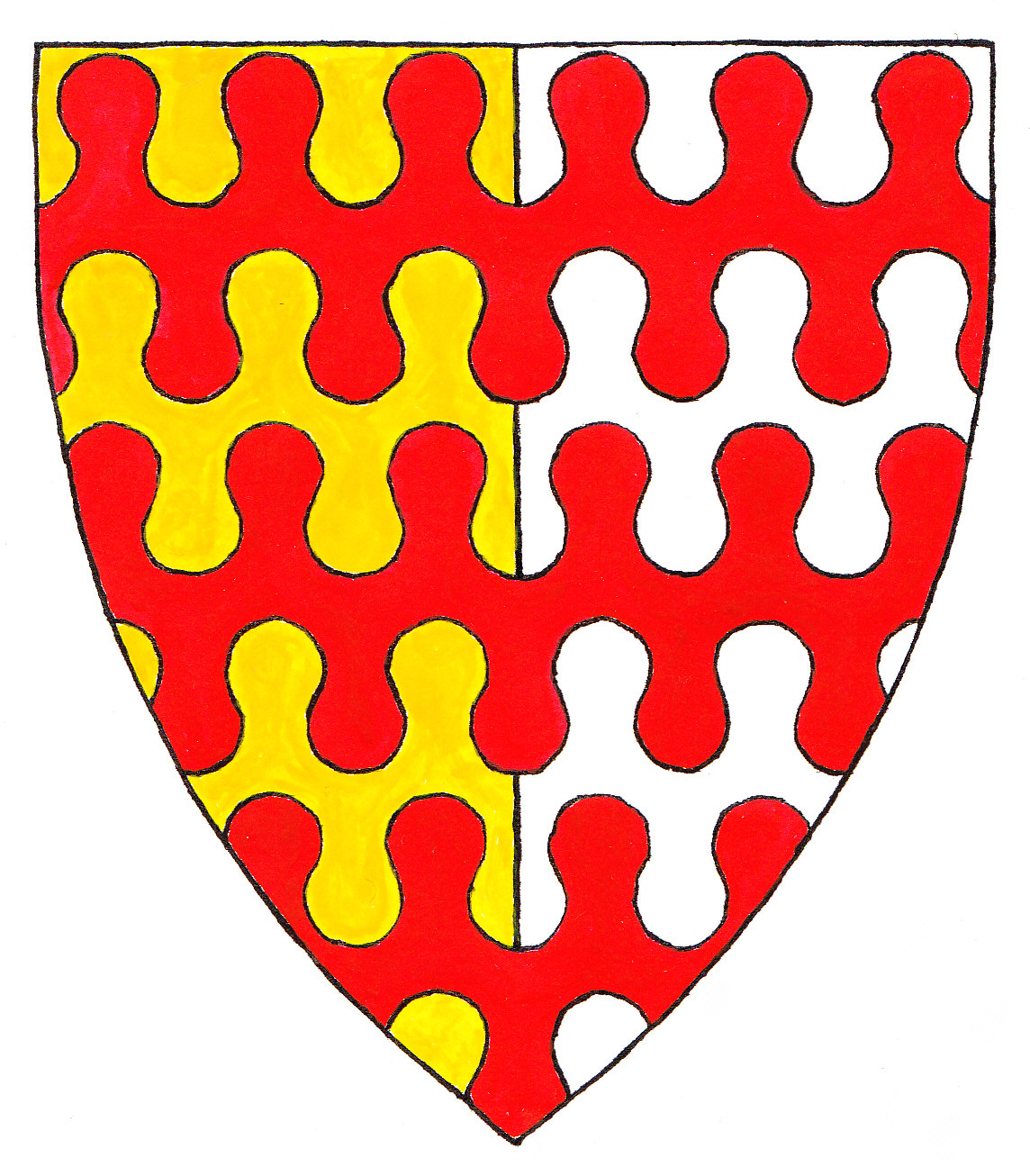
Armorials of the de Dauntsey family of Dauntsey, Wiltshire: Per pale or and argent, 3 bars nebulée gules. These arms can be seen on various monuments within Dauntsey parish church

Before 1412, aged 56, Russell married 17-year-old Joan Dauntsey (c. 1395–1457), sister and eventual heiress of Sir Walter Dauntsey as daughter of Sir John Dauntsey of Dauntsey, Wilts., by Elizabeth daughter and co-heiress of John Beverley of London. Russell died in 1416.

At the time of Russell's first marriage, Dyrham and other estates had been entailed upon Isabel Childrey and her heirs by Russell, and hence passed to the two daughters Russel had by her. Maurice's heir general was his son Thomas (1412–1431), born to second wife, Joan. Before his death Russell had placed the bulk of his lands into the hands of feoffees to act as trustees for his son Thomas during his minority. These feoffees included Sir William Hankeford, Chief Justice; Robert Hill, Justice of the Common Pleas; Sir William Cheyne of Brooke, Wiltshire, Robert Poyntz of Iron Acton and Robert Stanshawe, Gloucestershire.

The elderly Sir John Stradling (died 1435) of Glamorgan, Wales, obtained the marriage of Maurice's widow, Joan, yet omitted to obtain royal licence to marry a widow of a King's Tenant-in-chief, which Russell was regarding Dyrham and other manors, and was fined heavily in 1418 for his error. Joan married thirdly, after 1435, John Dewall, next to whom she was buried in Dauntsey church in 1457.

By 1st wife Isabel Childrey, Maurice had two daughters:

- Margaret Russell (born c. 1383, died 1460) married twice, to Sir Gilbert Denys (died 1422) of Siston, Gloucestershire, and to John Kemys (died 1477).
- Isabel Russell (born c. 1386, died 1437) married successively to four men: (1) William le Scrope, 1st Earl of Wiltshire, beheaded 1399 at Bristol by Henry Bolingbroke, Duke of Lancaster; (2) Sir Thomas de la River (died 1406) of Tormarton & Acton Turville, Gloucestershire; (3) Sir John Drayton (died 1417) of Nuneham Courtenay; and (4) Stephen Hatfield (died 1461), esquire.

Isabel and Drayton sold their share in the Russell lands to Margaret and her husband Sir Gilbert Denys, whose family retained Kingston Russell until 1543, Dyrham until 1571 and Aust until after 1600.

By 2nd wife Joan Dauntsey (c. 1395–1457), Maurice had a single child:

- Thomas Russell, born c. 1412, was aged no more than 4 years old at his father's death and his wardship was granted to Thomas of Lancaster, 1st Duke of Clarence. The ward was married while still a minor, but his wife's name is unknown, and he had a daughter Margery. Father and daughter both died in mysterious circumstances in 1431 and 1432. Much of the Russell lands descended to his half-sisters Margaret and Isabel and their families, mainly passing into the Denys family. Some of Thomas's lands, especially those in the Isle of Wight, were inherited by John Haket (died 1498), his first cousin, son of Alice Russell, his aunt.

== Sources ==
- Roskell, J.S. (ed.) et alia, The History of Parliament: The House of Commons 1386–1421, 4 vols., Stroud, 1992. Vol. 4, pp. 251–253, Russell, Sir Maurice, biography by L.S.Woodger.
- Scott-Thomson, Gladys. Two Centuries of Family History (early history of the Russell family, Dukes of Bedford), London, 1930. Appendix D, pp. 324–328, Pedigree of Russell of Kingston Russell.
- Gorges, Raymond & Brown, Frederick, Rev., FSA. The Story of a Family through Eleven Centuries, Illustrated by Portraits and Pedigrees: Being a History of the Family of Gorges. Boston, USA, (Merrymount Press privately published), 1944.
- Wiffen, Jeremiah Holmes Historical Memoirs of the House of Russell, (2 Vols.), vol. 1, London, 1833, Russell of Dyrham, pp.142-155 (contains much inaccuracy)
- Round, J. Horace. Studies in Peerage and Family History, Vol. 2, London, 1901, pp.250-279, The Origin of the Russells (a severe critique of Wiffen's work)
- Davis Cecil T., The Monumental Brasses of Gloucestershire, London, 1899, reprinted Bath, 1969, pp. 25–28.
- Jefferies, P.J. (1976). "Social Mobility in the Fourteenth Century: The Example of the Chelreys of Berkshire" (PDF). Oxoniensia. 41: 324–336.
- Victoria County History, Berkshire, 1923, Vol.3: Parishes of Blewbury with Upton and Aston Upthorpe: Upton, pp. 280–291.
- Victoria County History, Somerset (On-line texts in progress, Univ. of London, April 2007), North Cadbury.
- Victoria County History, Somerset, 1999, vol.7: Bruton, Horethorne & Norton Ferris Hundreds: Horsington, pp. 119–131
- Sanders, English Baronies, p. 68. (Newmarch)
- Saul, Nigel. Knights and Esquires: The Gloucestershire Gentry in the Fourteenth Century, Oxford, 1981
