= Baynham Throckmorton =

Baynham Throckmorton may refer to:

- Sir Baynham Throckmorton, 2nd Baronet (c. 1606-1664), supported the Royalist cause during the English Civil War and was a Member of Parliament for Gloucestershire from 1661 until his death on 28 May 1664.
- Sir Baynham Throckmorton, 3rd Baronet (c. 1628-c. 1681), English politician who sat in the House of Commons at various times between 1656 and 1679

See also

- Throckmorton Baronets
