= John Stephens (English politician) =

English politician

John Stephens (1603 – 4 August 1679) was an English politician who sat in the House of Commons at various times between 1645 and 1660.

== Biography ==
Stephens was the second son of Thomas Stephens of Little Sodbury, Gloucestershire and was educated at Lincoln College, Oxford. In 1620 he entered the Middle Temple, where he was called to the bar in 1628, and practised law in Elm Court. He was the brother of Edward Stephens.

Stephens inherited from his father Lypiatt House in the neighbourhood of Bisley. The house was garrisoned by Parliamentary troops during the Civil War but partially set on fire during a Royalist attack under Sir Jacob Astley, who was later forced to make good the damage from his own assets.

Stephens was elected Member of Parliament for Tewkesbury in the Long Parliament in 1645. In 1659 he was elected MP for Gloucestershire in the Third Protectorate Parliament. In April 1660, he was elected MP for Bristol in the Convention Parliament.

Stephens married four times: Elizabeth Ram of Essex, Grace, the daughter of John Brown of Frampton, Dorset, Anne, the daughter of John and sister and co-heir of Thomas Moulson of Hargrave, Cheshire, and Hester, daughter and co-heir of Mr Barnes of Alborough Hatch in Barking, Essex. He was succeeded by his eldest son Thomas, who was MP for Gloucestershire in 1695.

Parliament of England
Preceded by Sir Robert Cooke; Edward Stephens	Member of Parliament for Tewkesbury; 1645–1653; With: Edward Stephens 1645–1648	Succeeded by Not represented in Barebones Parliament
Preceded by George Berkeley; John Howe; John Crofts; Baynham Throckmorton; William Neast	Member of Parliament for Gloucestershire; 1659; With: John Grobham Howe	Succeeded by Restored Rump
Preceded by Not represented in Restored Rump	Member of Parliament for Bristol; 1660; With: Sir John Knight	Succeeded by Sir John Knight; Earl of Ossory
