= William Neast =

English politician

William Neast (c. 1623 – c. 1670) was an English politician who sat in the House of Commons in 1653 and in 1656.

Neast was the son of William Neast of the Neast family of Chaceley, Worcestershire. He matriculated at Magdalen College, Oxford, on 27 August 1638 aged 15 and entered Middle Temple in 1640. He received a commission as captain of horse on 8 February 1651

In 1653, Neast was elected Member of Parliament for Gloucestershire in Barebone's Parliament. He was re-elected MP for Gloucestershire in 1656 for the Second Protectorate Parliament. In 1662 he was removed from the Common Council of Tewkesbury.

Neast married Elizabeth Atwood of Old Sodbury.

Parliament of England
Preceded by Nathaniel Stephens	Member of Parliament for Gloucestershire; 1653; With: John Crofts; Robert Holmes	Succeeded by George Berkeley; Matthew Hale; John Howe; Christopher Guise; Sylvanus Wood
Preceded by George Berkeley; Matthew Hale; John Howe; Christopher Guise; Sylvanus Wood	Member of Parliament for Gloucestershire; 1656; With: George Berkeley; John Howe; Baynham Throckmorton; John Crofts	Succeeded by John Grobham Howe; John Stephens
