= Sir John Howe, 1st Baronet =

English politician

Sir John Howe, 1st Baronet (died 1671), was an English politician who sat in the House of Commons from 1654 to 1656.

Howe was the son of John Howe of Bishop's Lydeard, Somerset, and his wife Jane Grobham, daughter of Nicholas Grobham of Bishop's Lydiard. He was given the manor of Compton Abdale and other estates in Wiltshire by his uncle, Sir Richard Grobham. In 1650 he was High Sheriff of Gloucestershire.

In 1654, Howe was elected Member of Parliament for Gloucestershire in the First Protectorate Parliament. He was re-elected MP for Gloucestershire in 1656 for the Second Protectorate Parliament. He was created baronet on 22 September 1660.

Howe married Bridget Rich, daughter of Thomas Rich of North Cerney, Master in Chancery. Howe was succeeded in the baronetcy by his elder son Richard, who was successively MP for Wiltshire, Wilton and Hindon. His younger son John was MP for Gloucestershire.

Parliament of England
Preceded by John Crofts; Robert Holmes; William Neast	Member of Parliament for Gloucestershire; 1654–1656; With: George Berkeley; Matthew Hale 1654; Christopher Guise 1654; Sylvanus Wood 1654; Baynham Throckmorton 1656; John Crofts 1656; William Neast 1656	Succeeded by John Grobham Howe; John Stephens
Baronetage of England
New creation	Baronet of Compton; 1660–1671	Succeeded by Richard Howe
