= John Crofts =

English politician

John Crofts was an English politician who sat in the House of Commons in 1653 and in 1656. He fought in the Parliamentary army in the English Civil War.

Crofts was of Nether Swell, near Stow-on-the-Wold, Gloucestershire. His origins are obscure, but he may have been the brother of James Crofts, Sheriff of Bristol. He was an active captain in the Parliamentary army during the Civil War.

In 1653, Crofts was elected Member of Parliament for Gloucestershire in the Barebones Parliament. He was re-elected MP for Gloucestershire in 1656 for the Second Protectorate Parliament. He was captain of the militia in Gloucestershire in 1659. In 1662 he was removed from the Common Council of Tewkesbury.

Crofts married Anne Waterworth, a widow and daughter of Sir William Leigh of Longborow.

Parliament of England
Preceded by Nathaniel Stephens	Member of Parliament for Gloucestershire; 1653; With: William Neast; Robert Holmes	Succeeded by George Berkeley; Matthew Hale; John Howe; Christopher Guise; Sylvanus Wood
Preceded by George Berkeley; Matthew Hale; John Howe; Christopher Guise; Sylvanus Wood	Member of Parliament for Gloucestershire; 1656; With: George Berkeley; John Howe; Baynham Throckmorton; William Neast	Succeeded by John Grobham Howe; John Stephens
