= John Grobham Howe (died 1679) =

English politician

John Grobham Howe (1625–1679) of Langar Hall, Nottinghamshire, was an English politician who sat in the House of Commons between 1659 and 1679. He was the younger son of Sir John Howe, 1st Baronet, and his wife Bridget Rich, daughter of Thomas Rich of North Cerney. He was a student of Lincoln's Inn in 1645.

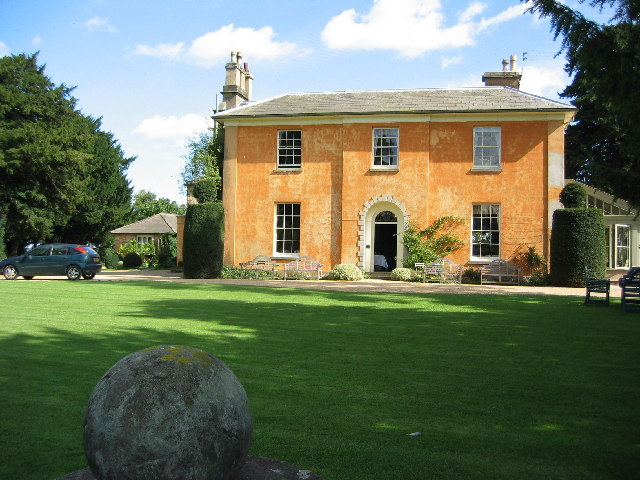
Langar Hall

In 1659, Howe was elected Member of Parliament for Gloucestershire in the Third Protectorate Parliament. He was reelected MP for Gloucestershire in 1661 for the Cavalier Parliament and sat until 1679. He died aged about 54 and was buried at Langar on 27 May 1679.

Howe married Annabella, the illegitimate daughter of Emanuel Scrope, 1st Earl of Sunderland, and Martha Jones. She became co-heiress of her father's estate and brought the manor of Langar, Nottinghamshire, to her husband. In 1663, King Charles granted her the precedence of an Earl's legitimate daughter and she became Lady Annabelle Howe. They had four sons, Scrope Howe, 1st Viscount Howe, John Grubham Howe (MP for Gloucestershire), Charles Howe and Emanuel Howe, and five daughters.

Parliament of England
Preceded by George Berkeley, Baron Berkeley; John Howe; Baynham Throckmorton; John Crofts; William Neast	Member of Parliament for Gloucestershire; 1659	Not represented in the restored Rump Parliament
Preceded by Edward Stephens; Matthew Hale	Member of Parliament for Gloucestershire; 1661–1679; With: Sir Baynham Throckmorton, Bt (1661–1664); Sir Baynham Throckmorton, Bt (1664–1679)	Succeeded by Sir John Guise, Bt; Sir Ralph Dutton, Bt
