= Sylvanus Wood =

English politician

Sylvanus Wood MP
- Born: 1604
- Died: November 1675 (aged 70–71)
- Known for: Member of parliament for Gloucestershire in the First Protectorate Parliament

Sylvanus Wood (1604 – November 1675) was an English politician who sat in the House of Commons in 1654.

Wood was the son of Richard Wood of Brookthorpe and his wife Anne Vaughan, daughter of Walter Vaughan of Hergest, Herefordshire. He became a student of Lincoln's Inn and was called to the bar on 7 December 1632. In 1642, he was appointed a commissioner for the city of Gloucester.

In 1654, Wood was elected member of parliament for Gloucestershire in the First Protectorate Parliament.

Wood died at the age of 71.

Wood married Bridget Cresheld, daughter of Richard Cresheld of Evesham.

Parliament of England
Preceded by John Crofts; Robert Holmes; William Neast	Member of Parliament for Gloucestershire; 1654; With: George Berkeley; Matthew Hale 1654; Christopher Guise; John Howe	Succeeded by George Berkeley; John Howe; Baynham Throckmorton; John Crofts; William Neast
