= Christopher Guise =

English politician (d. 1670)

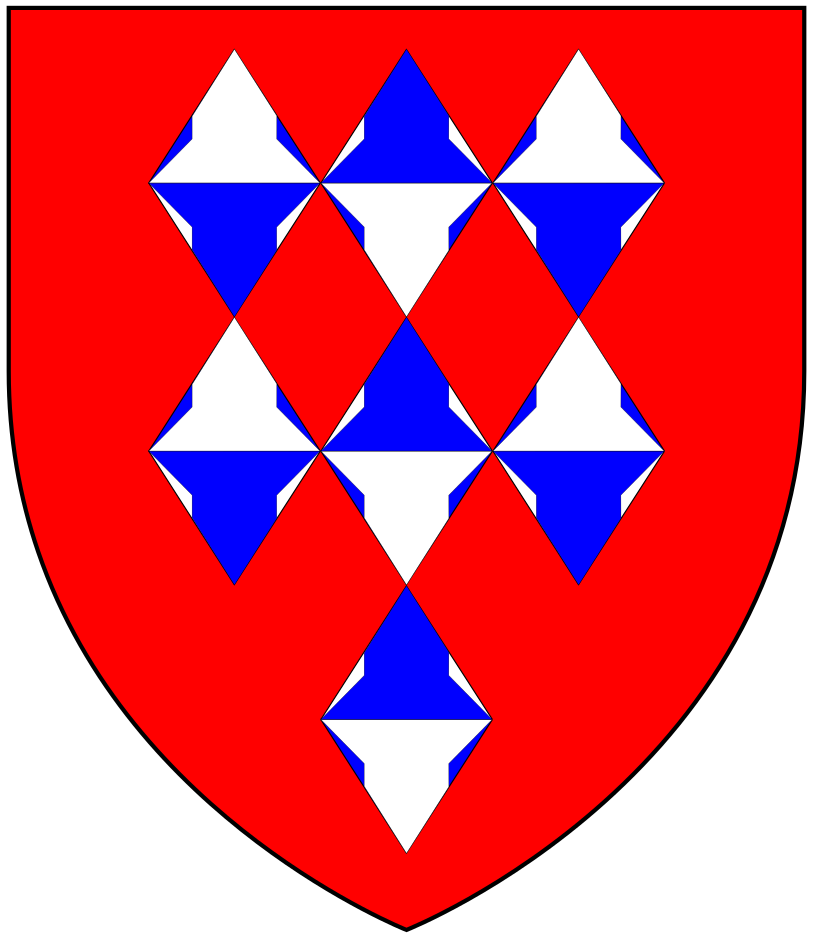
Arms of Guise: Gules, seven lozenges conjoined vairé three, three and one

Sir Christopher Guise, 1st Baronet (died 1670), of Elmore Court in Gloucestershire, England, was a member of parliament for Gloucestershire in 1654.

== Origins ==
Guise was the son of William Guise of Elmore by his wife Cecilia Dennis, a daughter of John Dennis of Pucklechurch in Gloucestershire.

== Career ==
In 1654 Guise was elected a member of parliament for Gloucestershire in the First Protectorate Parliament. He was created a baronet "of Elmore" on 10 July 1661.

== Marriages and children ==
Guise married firstly Elizabeth Washington, daughter of Sir Lawrence Washington of Garsden, Wiltshire. He married secondly Rachel Corsellis of a noble Italian family. He was succeeded by his son Sir John Guise, 2nd Baronet.

Parliament of England
Preceded by John Crofts; Robert Holmes; William Neast	Member of Parliament for Gloucestershire; 1654; With: George Berkeley; Matthew Hale 1654; Sylvanus Wood; John Howe	Succeeded by George Berkeley; John Howe; Baynham Throckmorton; John Crofts; William Neast
Baronetage of England
New creation	Baronet (of Elmore); 1661–1670	Succeeded by John Guise
