= Sir Baynham Throckmorton, 2nd Baronet =

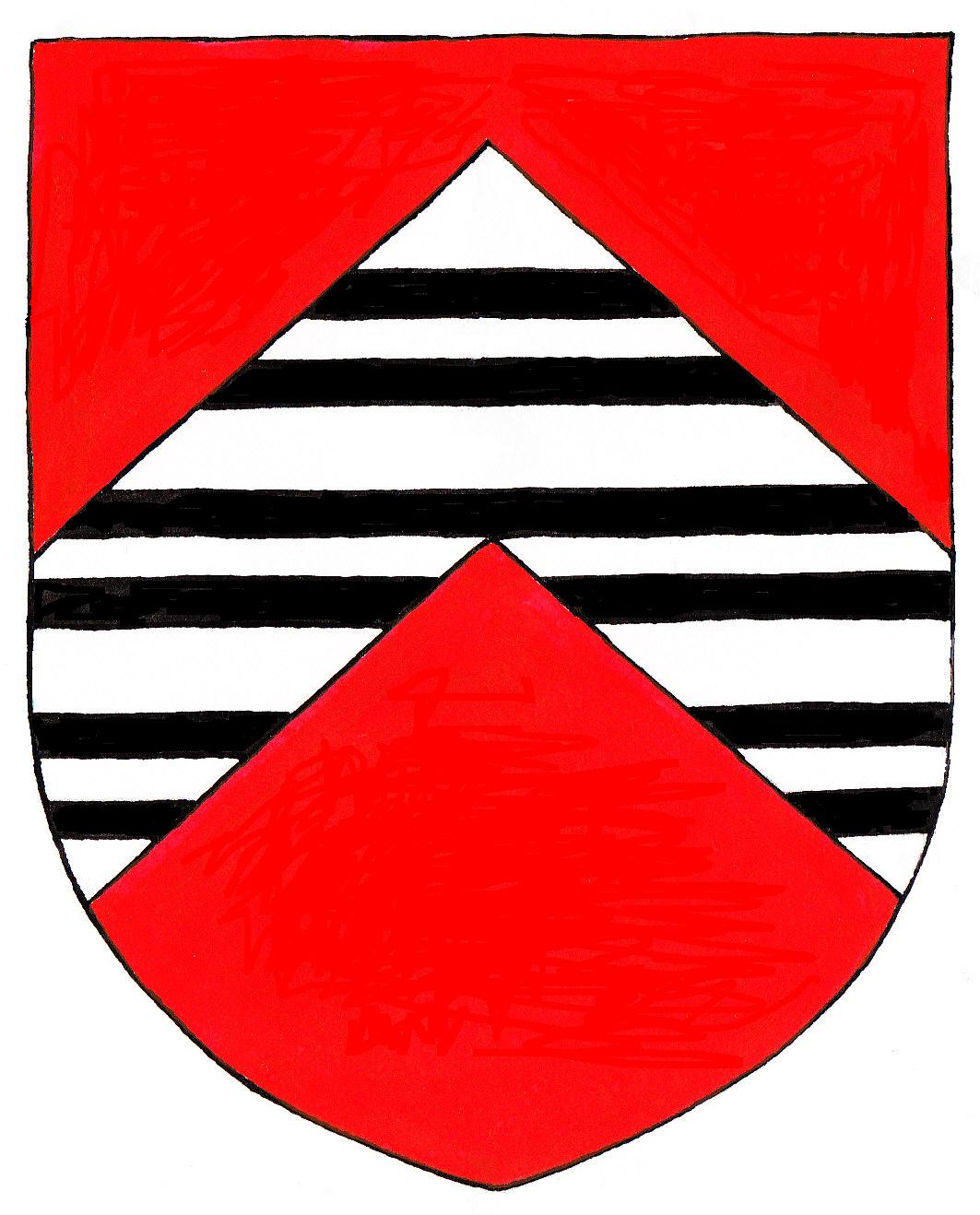
Arms of Throckmorton: Gules, on a chevron argent three bars gemelles sable. Crest: A falcon rising proper belled and jessed or. Mottos: (1): Virtus Sola Nobilitas (Virtue is the only nobility); (2): Moribus Antiquis (With ancient manners)

Sir Baynham Throckmorton, 2nd Baronet (1606 – 28 May 1664), of Clearwell, Gloucestershire, supported the Royalist cause during the English Civil War and was a Member of Parliament for Gloucestershire from 1661 until his death on 28 May 1664.

== Origins ==
Throckmorton was born about 1606 to Sir William Throckmorton, 1st Baronet (died 1628) and Cicely Baynham, daughter of Thomas Baynham (died 1611) of Clearwell, Gloucestershire by Mary Winter, daughter of Sir William Winter of Lydney.

== Career ==
Throckmorton received an education in law at the Inner Temple which he left in 1623. On the death of his father on 18 July 1628, he succeeded to the Throckmorton Baronetcy, aged 22.

Throckmorton was a Justice of the Peace in Gloucestershire from 1634 to 1645. He served as Chief Forester in the Forest of Dean from 1634 to 1645. This last office he held probably as a result of the location of his manor of Clearwell within the forest, which manor had previously been held by his maternal ancestor Sir Thomas Baynham (died 1500) who had been constable of St Briavel's Castle, the official residence of the forester. In 1635 with three partners he took an active part in the iron industry in the Forest of Dean after acquiring a lease in the forest from the Crown. However the venture did not prosper and two years later he was obliged to place his estates in the hands of trustees to settle his debts.

From 1642 to 1643 Throckmorton was Sheriff of Gloucestershire and at the start of the Civil War was appointed a Commissioner of Array for King Charles I. He was an active Cavalier between 1642 and 1645, holding the rank of Lieutenant-Colonel of Horse in the cavalry. He was captured by parliamentary forces and surrendered at Gloucester in December 1645. His lands were sequestrated by Parliament because they found him to be a royalist delinquent. He did not pay the fine imposed on him by the Parliamentary Committee for Compounding with Delinquents, with the result that his estate was sold to Thomas Gookin. However it is likely that this was a collusive purchase to circumvent the Parliamentary fine.

In 1659 like many former active Cavaliers Throckmorton was held in preventative custody as a precaution against a Royalist and Presbyterian revolt. Parliamentary forces were successful in preventing a country-wide uprising and only the county of Cheshire partook in Booth's rebellion led by Sir George Booth. Sir Baynham was released on £2,000 bail.

In July 1660, following the Restoration, Throckmorton was appointed an oyer and terminer on the Oxford circuit. He won a seat as one of the two MP's for Gloucestershire in the Cavalier Parliament, although his election was not confirmed until 19 April 1662, due to his having been listed as a friend by Philip Wharton, 4th Baron Wharton, who was now highly distrusted by the ruling party having been a Parliamentarian during the Civil War, a Puritan and a favourite of Oliver Cromwell. Throckmorton was active from the start and was appointed to 134 committees.

== Marriage and progeny ==
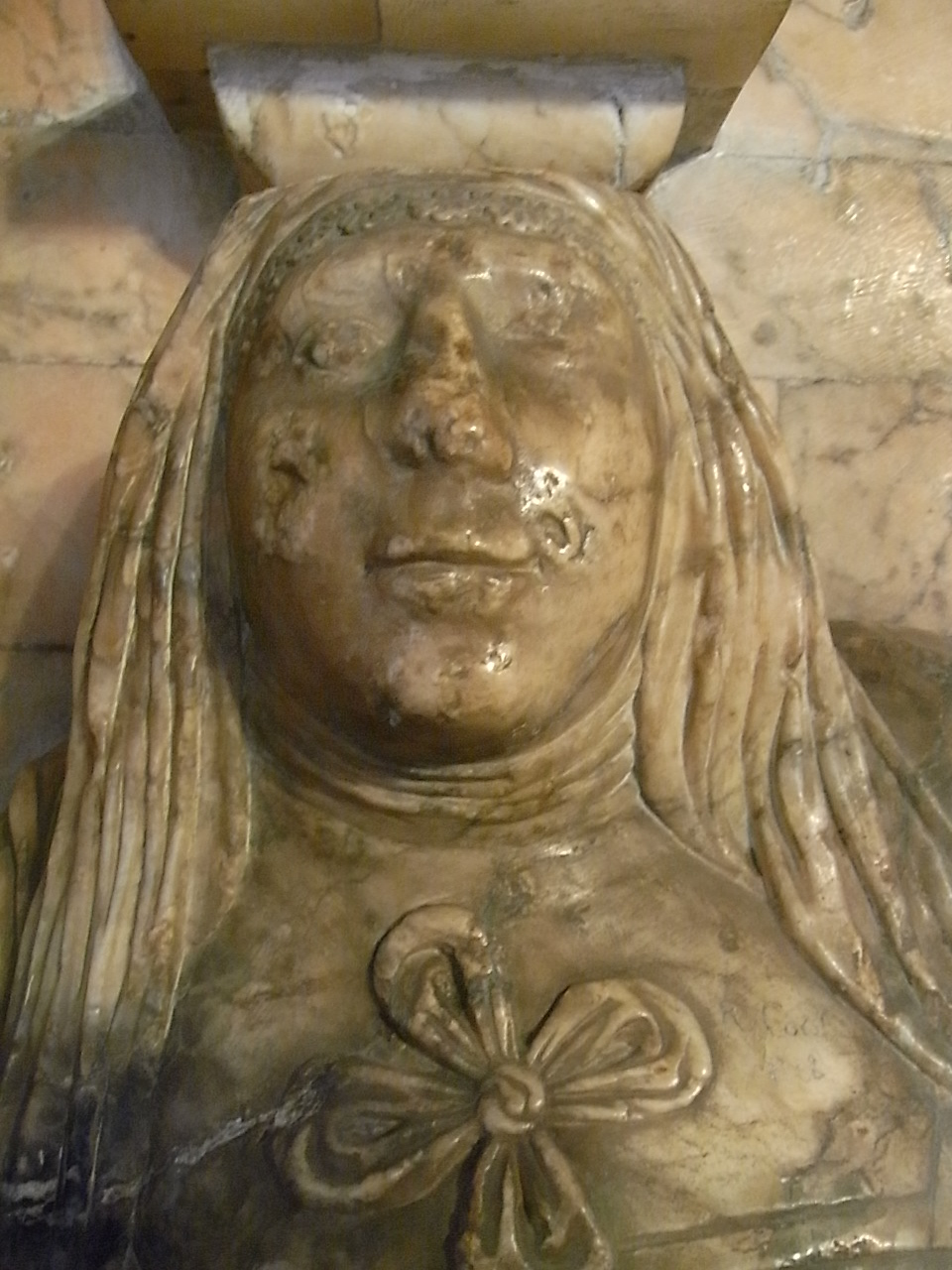
Effigy of Margaret Hopton (died 1635), wife of Sir Baynham Throckmorton, 2nd Baronet(d.1664), in The Gaunt's Chapel, Bristol. The top of the head has been cut off with the head-dress which was probably a lace-edged coif and veil reaching to below the shoulders.

Throckmorton married Margaret Hopton, daughter of Robert Hopton (c.1575-1638), of Witham, Somerset by Jane Kemeys, daughter of Rowland Kemeys about 1628. She was a co-heiress, in her issue, of her brother Ralph Hopton, 1st Baron Hopton of Stratton. By her he had two sons Sir Baynham Throckmorton, 3rd Baronet (c. 1628-c. 1681) and Major Thomas Throckmorton who was executed for mutiny in Jamaica in 1656. She died in childbirth aged 25 on 18 August 1635, which circumstance is possibly alluded to in the holding by her effigy of an infant dressed in swaddling clothes. Some sources suggest Throckmorton was married three times.

== Death ==
Throckmorton died on 28 May 1664 and was buried the next day at St Margaret's, Westminster. He had probably intended to be buried with his wife in The Gaunts, Bristol, but as Barker speculated "the fates disposed otherwise". A monumental inscription in his memory exists in the parish church of Newland, Forest of Dean, in which parish is situated Clearwell. He was succeeded by his son and heir Sir Baynham Throckmorton, 3rd Baronet.

== Monument in The Gaunt's Chapel ==
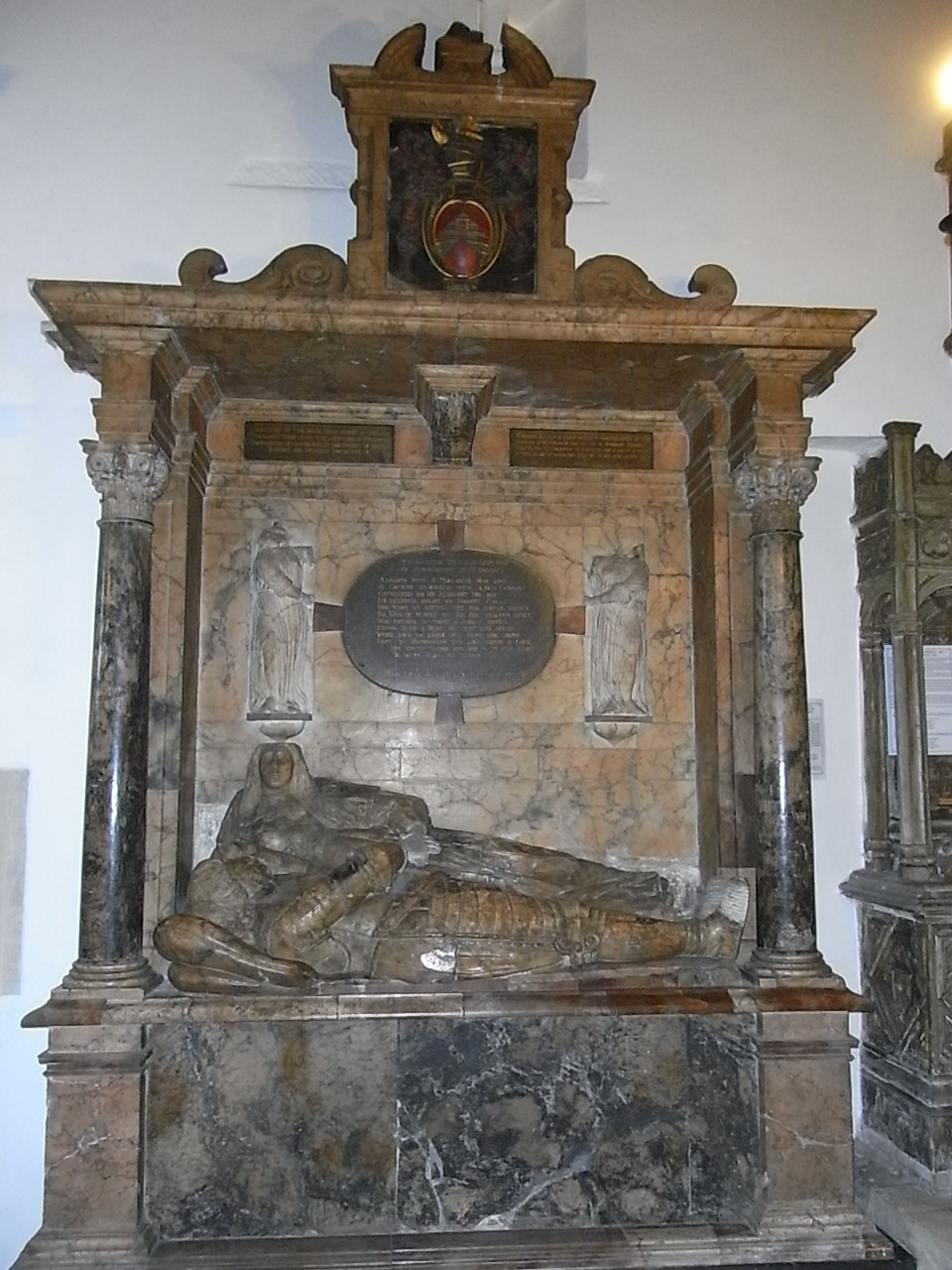
Marble monument (c. 1635) erected by Sir Baynham Throckmorton, 2nd Baronet(d.1664) in memory of his wife Margaret Hopton (died 1635). The Gaunt's Chapel, Bristol

On the death in 1635 of his wife Margaret Hopton aged 25, Throckmorton erected a very costly monument in a variety of coloured marbles to her memory in The Gaunt's Chapel, Bristol. The Gaunt's was a charitable foundation established in 1220 by Maurice de Gaunt (died 1230), who was a member of the Berkeley family of Berkeley Castle. The Berkeleys maintained close links with the foundation even after Dissolution of the Monasteries (16th century) and it appears that the Throckmorton monument was placed here on account of Sir Baynham's descent from his grandmother Elizabeth Berkeley, wife of Sir Thomas Throckmorton, the daughter of Sir Richard Berkeley (died 1604) of Stoke Gifford, Gloucestershire, whose monument is also in The Gaunt's Chapel. The monument is unusual in that it features the still living Sir Baynham, who would survive a further 29 years. He is shown in front of his wife, reclining and dressed in armour with long flowing hair. Over his shoulders he wears a wide lace collar, with knee-plates and wide-toed boots. His wife reclines behind him, half-raised and leaning on her right elbow, looking out towards the viewer. She is richly dressed and with one hand grasps that of her husband whilst with the other she holds their infant son, who is according to Barker "quaintly dressed". The monument contains the following inscription, much mutilated and worn, on two small rectangular black marble panels beneath the ceiling of the canopy:

"Dedicated to the never dying memory of the Lady Margaret Throckmorton, the late wife of Sir Baynham Throckmorton, of Clowerwall, in the County of Glouc., Baronet, and youngest daughter of Mr. Robert Hopton, of that ancient and worthie family of the Hoptons of Witham, in the County of Somerset, Esquire, who lifted up her soule to God upon the 18th day of August in the year of our Lord 1635 and of her age above 25".

The following lines of verse are contained within an oval tablet of black marble above the effigies:

"A precious Femme, a Margarite, was lent
To crowne Throckmorton with a rich content
Contented he his Margarite did set
In's faithfull breast his choisest cabanet
She wished no better till her lustre drew
The King of Heaven to like her gracious hue
Who deeming it unfit a subject should
Longer enjoy a femme of that rich mould
Tooke back his loane and fixing her above
Left to Throckmorton this sole pledge of love
Mors rapax, urna capax, sed spes tenax."
(Translated: "grasping Death, a roomy urn, but hope tenacious")

On the floor in front of the monument is a stone slab incised with the first part of the above inscription.

== Sources ==
- Barker, W.R., "St. Mark's or The Mayor's Chapel, Bristol", Bristol, 1892, pp. 181–183
- Cokayne, George Edward, ed. (1906). Complete Baronetage 1707–1800. Vol. 5. Exeter: William Pollard and Co. p. 65.
- Ferris, John. P. (1983). "THROCKMORTON, Sir Baynham, 2nd Bt. (1606-64), of Clearwell, Newland, Glos.". In Henning, Basil Duke (ed.). The History of Parliament: the House of Commons 1660-1690 (Online ed.). Boydell & Brewer. ISBN 978-0436192746.
- Roper, I.M., Effigies of Bristol. Published in Transactions of the Bristol and Gloucestershire Archaeological Society, Vol.26, 1903, Throckmorton, pp.278-281

Parliament of England
Preceded by Edward Stephens; Matthew Hale	Member of Parliament for Gloucestershire; 1661–1664; With: John Grobham Howe	Succeeded by John Grobham Howe; Sir Baynham Throckmorton, Bt
Baronetage of England
Preceded by William Throckmorton	Baronet (of Tortworth); 1628–1664	Succeeded by Baynham Throckmorton
