= Robert Holmes (Gloucestershire MP) =

Robert Holmes was an English politician who sat in the House of Commons in 1653.

Holmes was a justice of the peace of Netherton, Gloucestershire in 1649. In 1653, he was elected member of parliament for Gloucestershire in the Barebones Parliament.

Holmes and married Elizabeth Kyrle, daughter of Francis Kyrle.

Parliament of England
Preceded by Nathaniel Stephens	Member of Parliament for Gloucestershire; 1653; With: John Crofts; William Neast	Succeeded by George Berkeley; Matthew Hale; John Howe; Christopher Guise; Sylvanus Wood
