= Thomas Throckmorton (died 1656) =

English mutineer

Thomas Throckmorton was an officer in the New Model Army who was executed in Jamaica in May 1656 for mutiny.

Thomas was the son of Sir Baynham Throckmorton, 2nd Baronet.
