= Lady Henrietta Berkeley =

English aristocrat

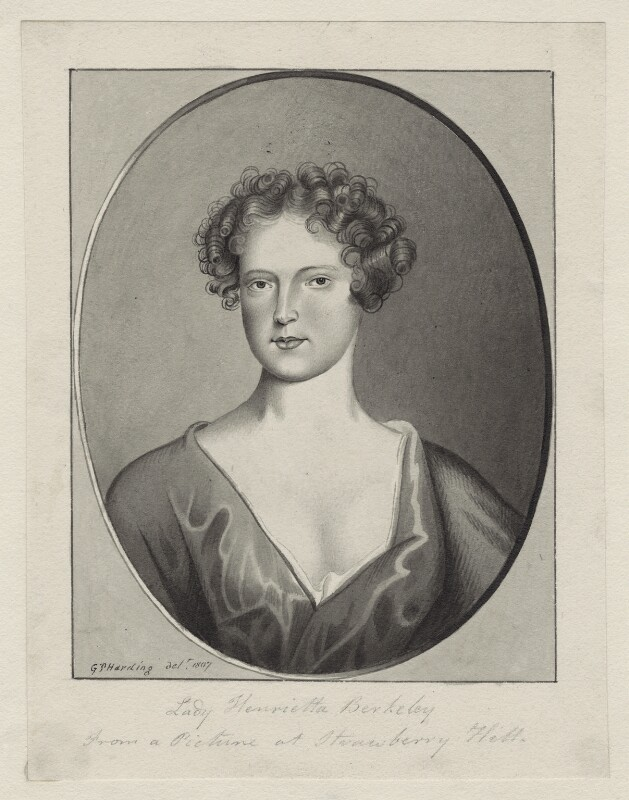
- Portrait of Lady Henrietta Berkeley (1807)
- Born: Henrietta Harriett Berkeley c. 1664
- Disappeared: 1682; Epsom, England
- Status: Found in London later that year
- Died: 1706 (aged 41–42); London, England
- Known for: Adultery with sister's husband
- Partner: Lord Grey of Warke
- Parent(s): George Berkeley, 1st Earl of Berkeley; Elizabeth Massingberd

Lady Henrietta Berkeley (c. 1664–1706) was an English aristocrat notorious for having an affair with her elder sister's husband, Lord Grey of Warke. The affair began in 1681 when Berkeley was not yet an adult and was discovered by her mother the following year. Berkeley was removed to the family seat at Epsom. She escaped and went into hiding in lodging houses in London, under the protection of Grey. Her father, George Berkeley, 1st Earl of Berkeley, sued her lover in a trial which became a sensation in 1682.

At the court of the King's Bench, Berkeley claimed to have left home with Grey of her own free will and also to have married William Turner, who was Grey's servant. After a scuffle with her father outside court, she was briefly imprisoned with Turner for her own safety. When Grey was implicated in the Rye House Plot the following year, the couple fled to Cleves, with Turner in their entourage. At the time, Berkeley was pregnant and it is not known if she returned to England with Grey for the Monmouth Rebellion in 1685. She died in London in 1706.

== Scandal ==
Lady Henrietta Berkeley was born to Lady Elizabeth and George Berkeley, 1st Earl of Berkeley, in 1664 or later. She was one of six daughters and there were also two sons. At some point in 1681, Berkeley began an affair with Ford Grey, Lord Grey of Warke, who was married to her elder sister Lady Mary. The affair was discovered by her suspicious mother, Lady Elizabeth, in 1682, when she sent another sister (Lady Arabella) to check for evidence in Berkeley's room at Berkeley House (later Devonshire House) in London. A letter was discovered in which Berkeley had written "My sister Bell did not suspect our being together last night; for she did not hear the noise. Pray come again Sunday or Monday; if the last, I shall be very impatient".

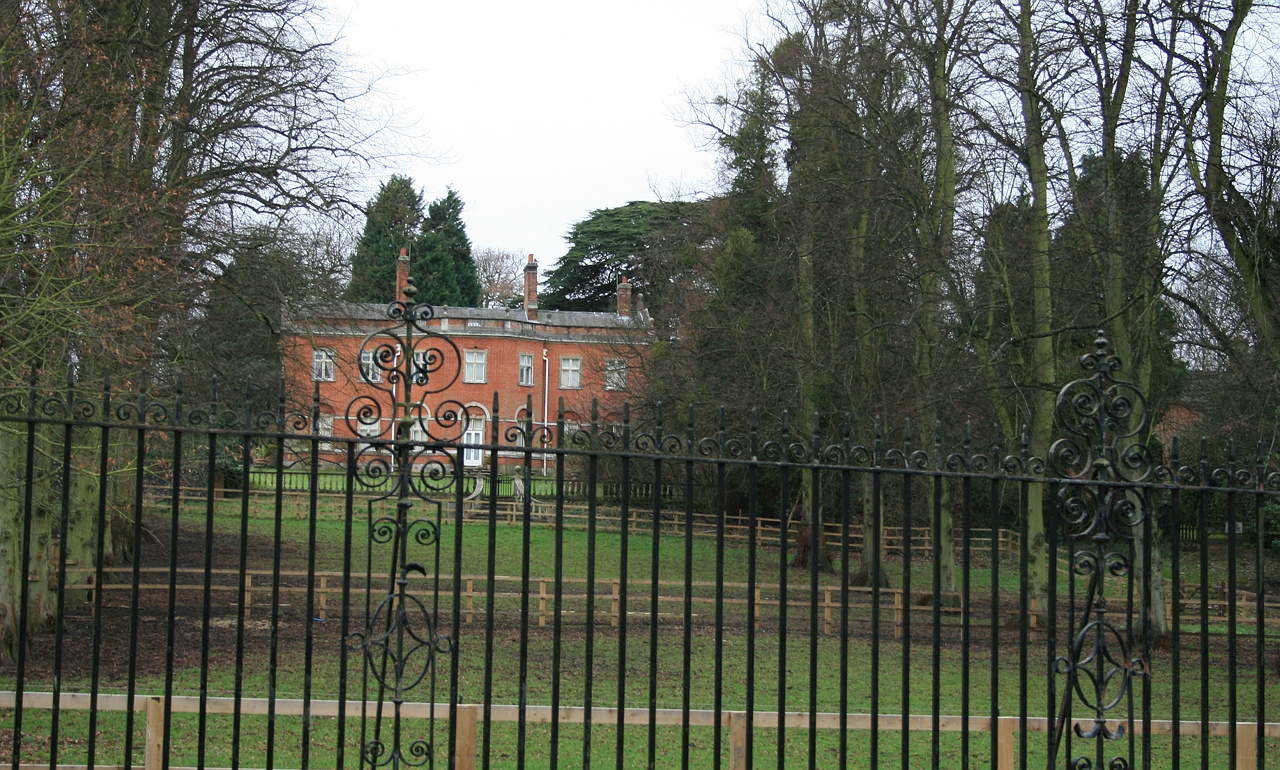
Durdans, the Berkeley family seat in Epsom

Lady Elizabeth banned the lovers from seeing each other and took Berkeley to the family seat at Durdans in Epsom, outside London. Lady Mary was also there and she invited her husband to visit, not knowing about his adultery. Lady Elizabeth had been too mortified to tell either Lady Mary or the Earl of Berkeley about the scandal and therefore was forced to host Grey for several days. When he left, Berkeley escaped from the house the same night and followed him back to London.

Berkeley then stayed at various lodging houses in London and her family set a reward of £200 (equivalent to about £40,087 in 2023) for anyone who could tell them her whereabouts. A note announcing the reward in the September 1682 London Gazette described her as "a young lady of a fair complexion, fair haired, full breasted, and indifferent tall". Grey told her parents that he was still in contact with her but refused to tell them where she was.

== Trial ==
The trial of Lord Grey of Warke and others
- Court: King's Bench
- Full case name: The Trial of Ford Lord Grey of Werk, Robert Charnock, Anne Charnock, David Jones, Frances Jones, and Rebecca Jones, at the King's Bench, for a Misdemeanor in debauching the Lady Henrietta Berkeley, Daughter of the Earl of Berkeley, AD 1682
- Decided: 1682
- Transcripts: Cobbett's Complete Collection of State Trials and Proceedings for High Treason and Other Crimes and Misdemeanors from the Earliest Period [1163] to the Present Time [1820]

Court membership
- Judge sitting: Sir Francis Pemberton

The Earl of Berkeley sued Lord Grey and his accomplices for conspiring to debauch his daughter. The prosecution charged Grey with "inveigling the Lady Henrietta Berkeley away, and causing her to live an ungodly and profligate life, carrying her about from place to place, and obscuring her in secret places, to the displeasure of Almighty God, the utter ruin of the young lady, the evil example to others, offending against the king's peace, his crown and dignity".

At the court of the King's Bench, when the jury were about to retire to consider the case, Berkeley sensationally announced that she had left her home of her own free will and declared that she was now the wife of a William Turner, who happened to be a servant of Grey. The Lord Chief Justice, Francis Pemberton, told her "You have injured your own reputation, and prostituted both your body and your honour, and are not to be believed". When the court broke up, Berkeley's father endeavoured to take his daughter away, but she resisted. Swords were drawn and in order to break up the scuffle, the judge decided Berkeley and her alleged husband were to be detained in the prison below the King's Bench for their own safety. They were subsequently released.

Grey was found guilty by the jury but received no punishment, as other events took precedence. After he was involved in the Rye House Plot of 1683 to assassinate both King Charles II of England and his brother (and future king) James, Duke of York, Grey was arrested, but managed to escape when his guard fell asleep. The reportedly pregnant Berkeley fled with him to the Netherlands in June, their entourage including William Turner. (Note: The ODNB entry for Berkeley says she was rumoured to be pregnant, the ODNB entry for Grey says she was pregnant.) In July, Grey was indicted in his absence for high treason. They travelled to Cleves (then part of Brandenburg-Prussia); afterwards, nothing can be said for certain about Berkeley's movements. It is unclear whether she returned to England soon afterwards or carried on living in Europe and only moved back much later. Grey returned to England as a leader of the unsuccessful Monmouth Rebellion in 1685, then obtained a pardon from King James II, regaining his honours and later becoming 1st Earl of Tankerville.

== Death and legacy ==
Berkeley died on 10 August 1706 in Tonbridge, Kent. Although it is not clear if they were still lovers, Grey, who died in 1701, had left her a life annuity of £200 (equivalent to about £41,000 in 2023). She left a sum of £370 (equivalent to about £78,329 in 2023) in her will, of which £100 went to her niece Lady Elizabeth Germain.

Love-Letters Between a Nobleman and His Sister was a contemporary novel which drew on the events of the scandal and was published anonymously in 1684. It is believed to have been written by Aphra Behn. Later, in the 19th century, George William MacArthur Reynolds wrote that Berkeley "unfortunately sacrificed her good name and affections of doting parents at the instigations of a consummate scoundrel".
