= Clearwell =

Village in Gloucestershire, England

Coordinates: 51.7691°N 2.6244°W

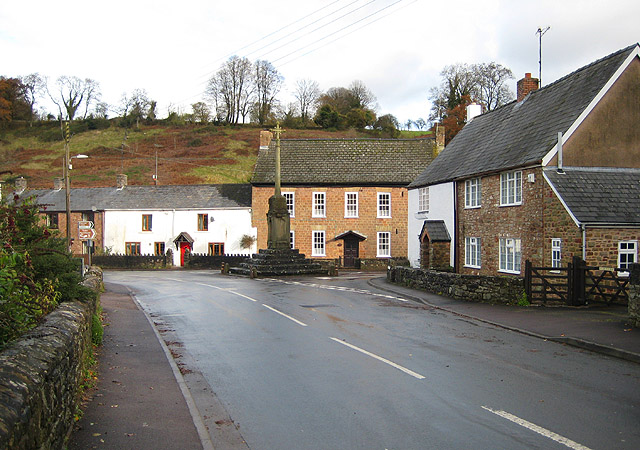

- Location within Gloucestershire
- OS grid reference: SO571080
- District: Forest of Dean
- Shire county: Gloucestershire
- Region: South West
- Country: England
- Sovereign state: United Kingdom
- Police: Gloucestershire
- Fire: Gloucestershire
- Ambulance: South Western
- UK Parliament: Forest of Dean

Clearwell (anciently "Clower-Wall" etc.) is a village and former ancient manor in the Forest of Dean, West Gloucestershire, England. Situated 3 miles south of Coleford and 2.5 miles east of the Welsh border (with Monmouthshire), a recent survey indicated that the population of Clearwell is approximately 350.

There are mines locally that date back over 7,000 years to the mining of ochre and are known as Clearwell Caves. Later, the Romans mined iron at Clearwell Meend. Iron production expanded in medieval times and peaked in the 16th and 17th centuries, leaving a legacy of fine stone built buildings.

Clearwell Castle, a 'mock' castle of Gothic architecture built in 1728, is located in Clearwell.

== History of the village ==
The village of Clearwell began as a group of hamlets which coalesced to form the village. It formed around three roads which run down shallow valleys to a central junction. The hamlets on the three roads were Clearwell, Peak, and Platwell, with a fourth hamlet, Wainlete, to the north-west of Clearwell. Clearwell and Platwell had dwellings by around 1300. In 1462 fourteen houses were mentioned at Clearwell and Wainlete, thirteen at Platwell, and sixteen at Peak. Most of the houses that formed Clearwell village were replaced by stone cottages in the late 18th century and the 19th, although several older buildings survive, including the Wyndham Arms which is a substantial 17th-century house.

In 1830 a chapel was built for Clearwell village at the east end, on the road leading to the Forest. It was replaced in 1866 by a new church built by the countess of Dunraven, owner of the Clearwell estate. The countess also built a village school in 1859 and opened a cottage hospital in 1869.

== Industry ==
There were several iron ore mines at Clearwell Meend in the 19th century. These included Old Sling, New Dun, and Old Ham. From the late 1960s Old Ham ore mine was developed, under the name Clearwell Caves, as a mining museum.

== Descent of the manor ==
=== Greyndour ===
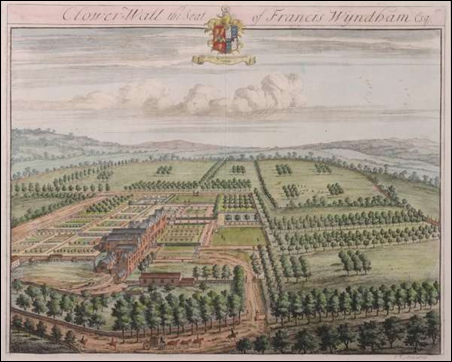
"Clower-Wall the seat of Francis Wyndham Esq." Clearwell Court in 1712, as drawn by Johannes Kip. The building was rebuilt in 1728 by Thomas Wyndham and survives today with its name having been changed in 1908 to Clearwell Castle.

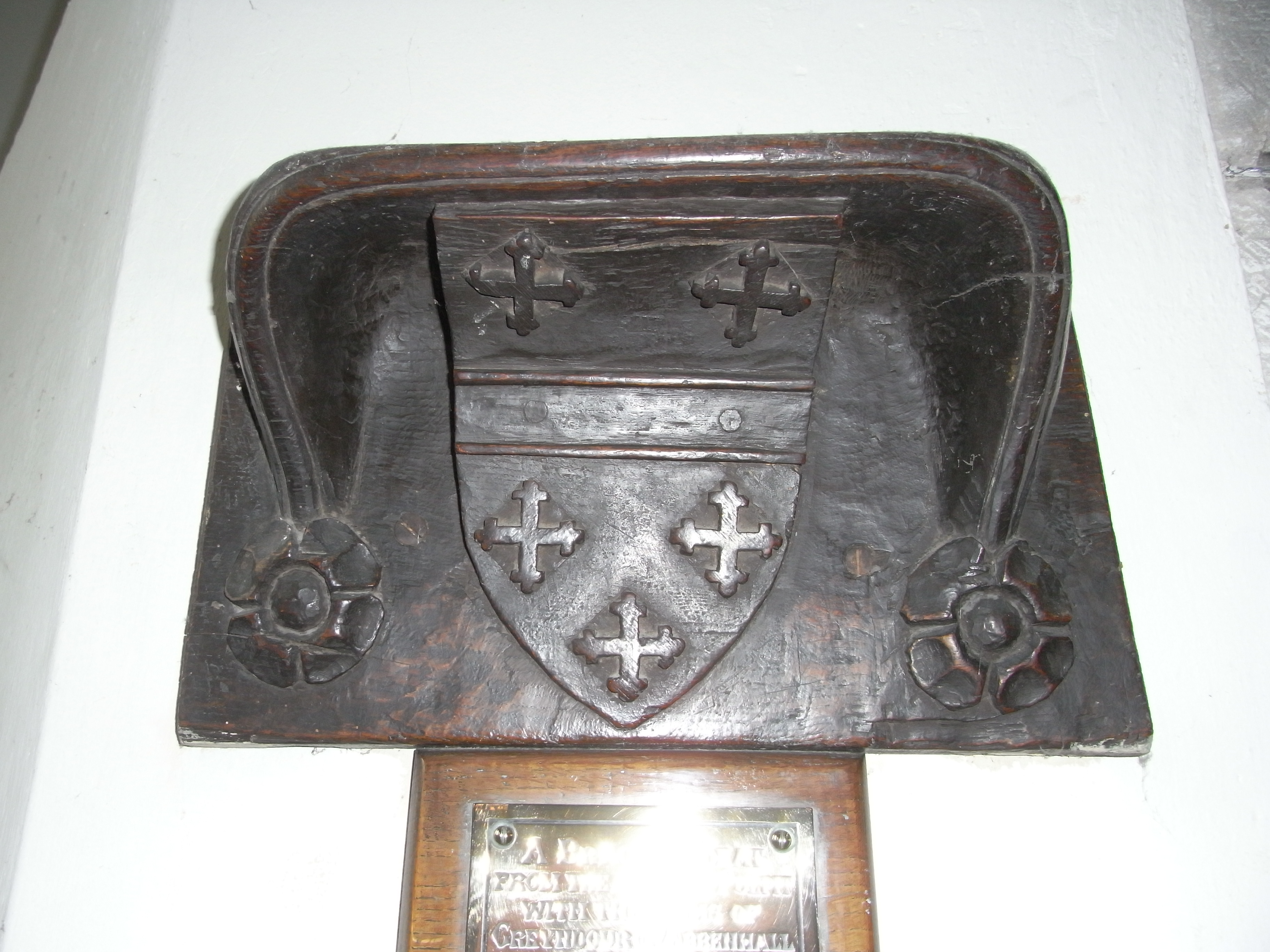
Bracket seat c. 1480, Mitcheldean Church, formerly attached to ancient pulpit, showing arms of Greyndour: Or, a fess between 5 crosses crosslet gules 2 and 3, as depicted on the 19th-century monument to Thomas Baynham (d. 1500) in the same church

The first manor house at Clearwell was probably built by Robert Greyndour (d.1443), and probably consisted of a great hall, chapel and 12 chambers. Robert died without male issue and his daughter Elizabeth Greyndour (d.1452) became his heiress. His widow and Elizabeth's mother Johanna Rigge (d.1485) (or Rugge), daughter of Thomas Rigge of Charlcombe, Somerset by Katherine de Bitton, daughter and heiress of Sir John de Bitton of Bitton, Glos., under customary usage, retained until her death 1/3 of his lands as her dower, and married secondly Sir John Barre. She founded a chantry in nearby Newland Church called the "Chantry of Robert Greyndour" and left many charitable bequests in her will. She was buried with her first husband in the chantry chapel she had founded in Newland Church. Elizabeth had earlier married Reginald West, 6th Baron De La Warr (d.1450/1), leaving a daughter Mary West. She married secondly, as his first wife, John Tiptoft, 1st Earl of Worcester, KG, (d.1470), whom she predeceased giving birth to a son, who did not survive one day.

=== Walwyn ===
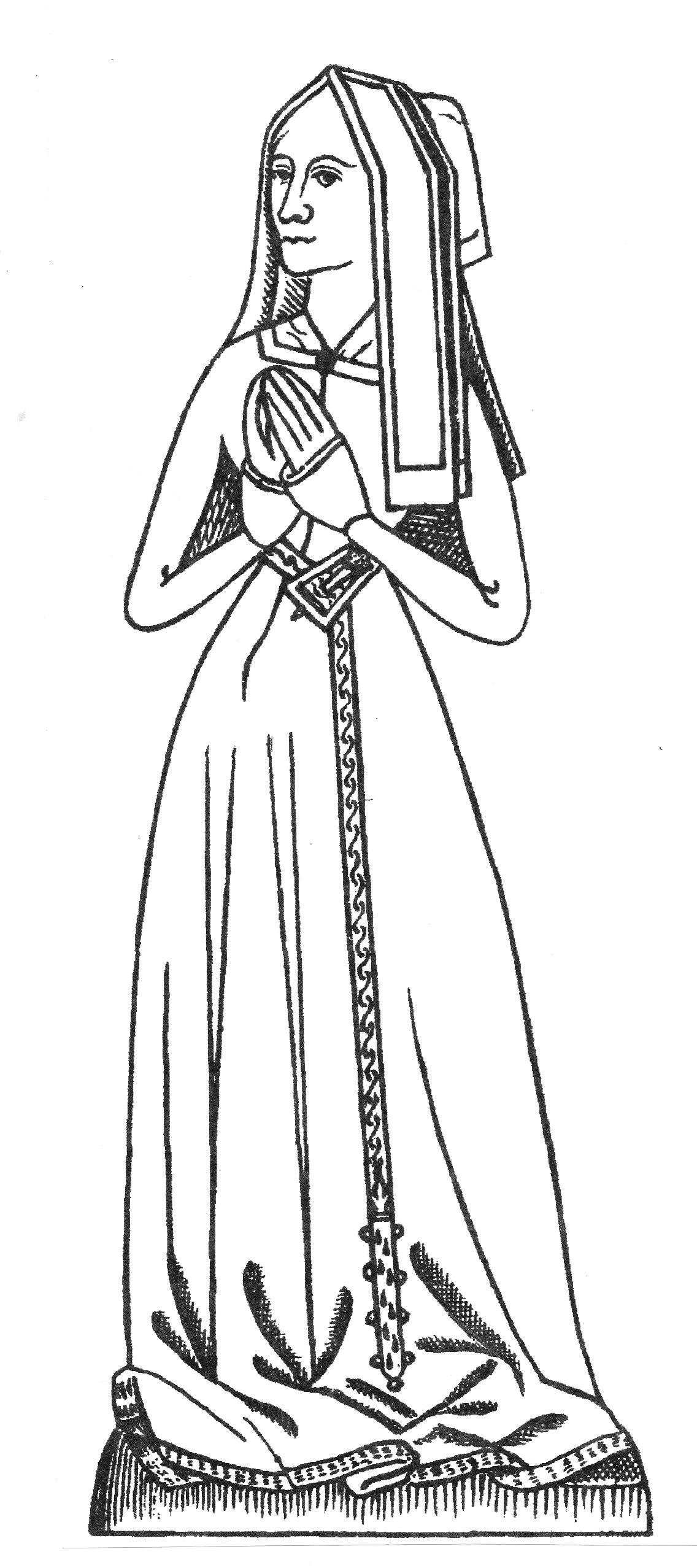
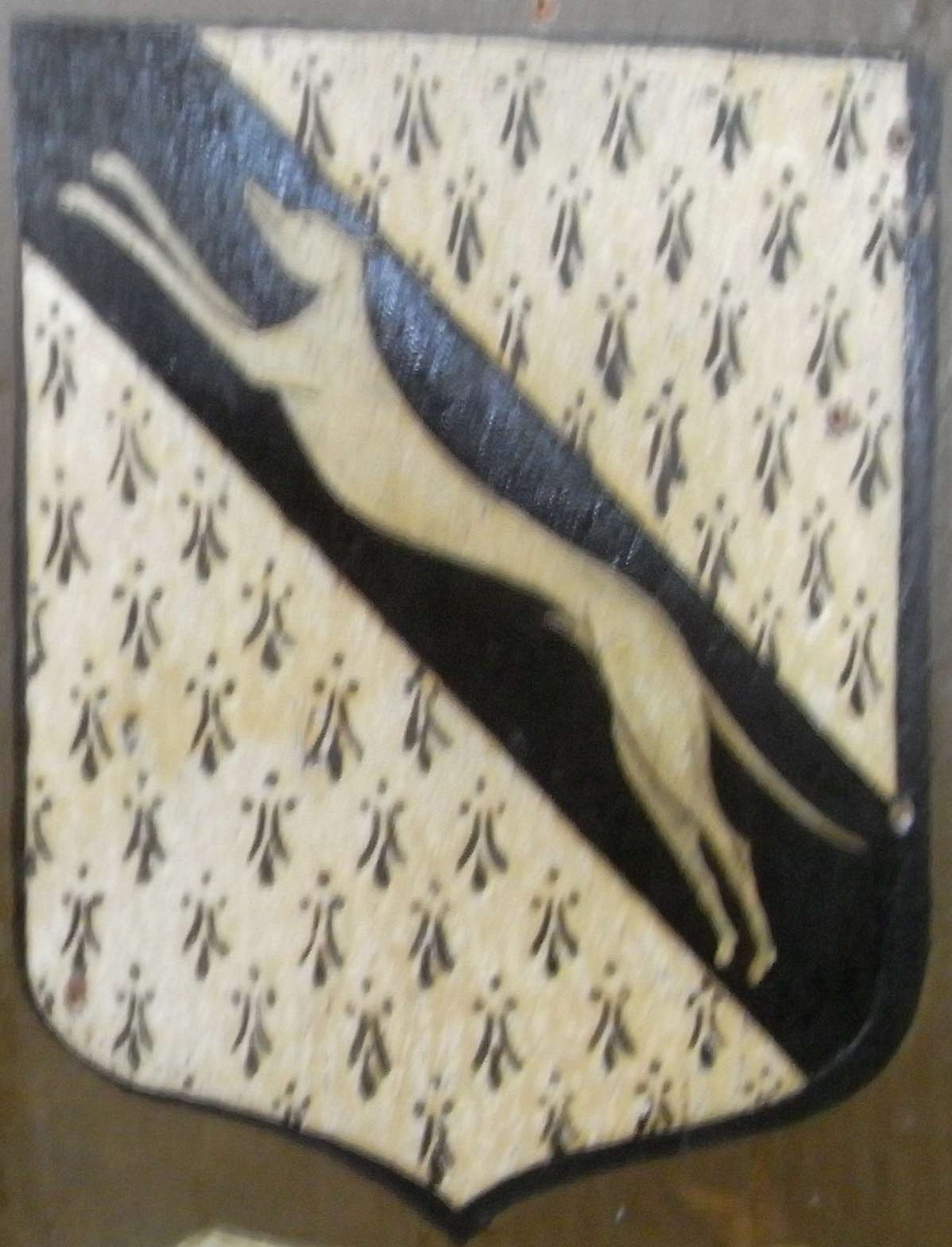
Left: Alice Walwyn, 2nd wife of Sir Thomas Baynham (d.1500); Right: arms of Walwyn: Ermine, on a bend sable a hound argent. Both from 19th-century mural monument to Thomas Baynham (d. 1500), Mitcheldean Church

The manor thereupon passed to the descendants of Robert Greyndour's sister Johanna, who had married as her first husband William Walwyn. Their son was William Walwyn, whose daughter and sole heiress was Alice Walwyn (d. 1518), the second wife of Thomas Baynham (d. 1500), Constable of St Briavel's Castle.

=== Baynham ===
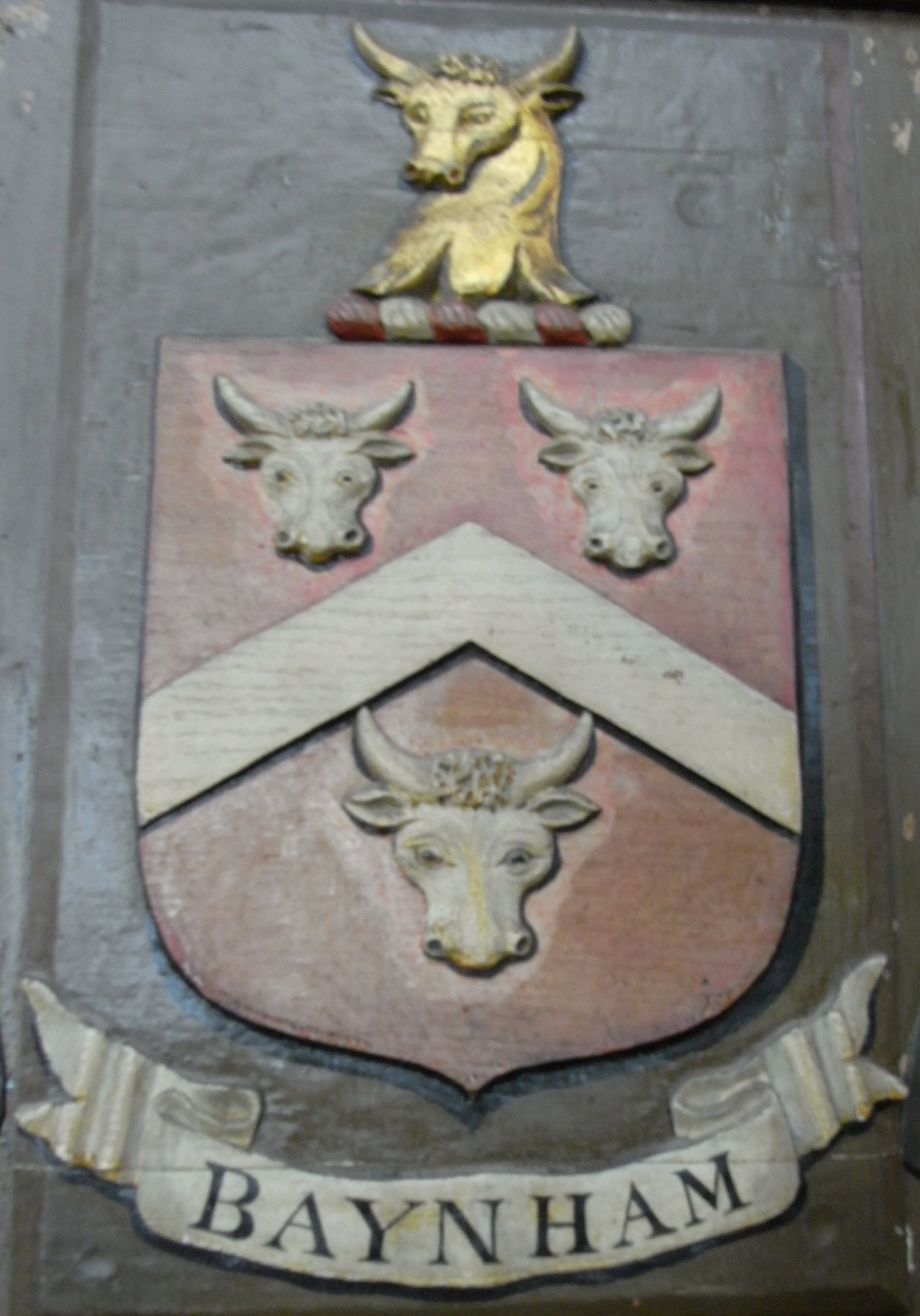
Arms of Baynham: Gules, a chevron argent between three bull's heads cabossed argent armed or. Crest: A bull's head erased or. Painted escutcheon on the 19th-century mural monument erected in Mitcheldean Church, Gloucestershire.

Alice survived her first husband, by whom she had a son Sir Christopher Baynham (d.1557), and married secondly, as his fourth wife, Sir Walter Denys (d.1505) of Alveston, Glos., Sheriff of Gloucestershire in 1481 and 1492, who apparently came to live at Clearwell as his will was dated at Newland. Christopher's son was Sir George Baynham (d.1546), who married as his second wife Cecilia Gage, daughter of Sir John Gage. Sir George dated his will at Clearwell, 9 June 1546, and was buried at Newland.

=== Throckmorton ===
Clearwell was held by the Baynham family until the death of Thomas Baynham in 1611. His daughter Cicely, by his wife Mary Winter, daughter of Sir William Winter of Lydney, had married Sir William Throckmorton, 1st Baronet, (d.1628), of Tortworth, Gloucestershire, and Clearwell descended to their son Sir Baynham Throckmorton, 2nd Baronet (1606–1664), who married Margaret Hopton (d.1635), one of the daughters of Robert Hopton of Witham and sister of Ralph Hopton, 1st Baron Hopton, possibly through which connection the manor was purchased by a member of the Wyndham family.

=== Wyndham ===
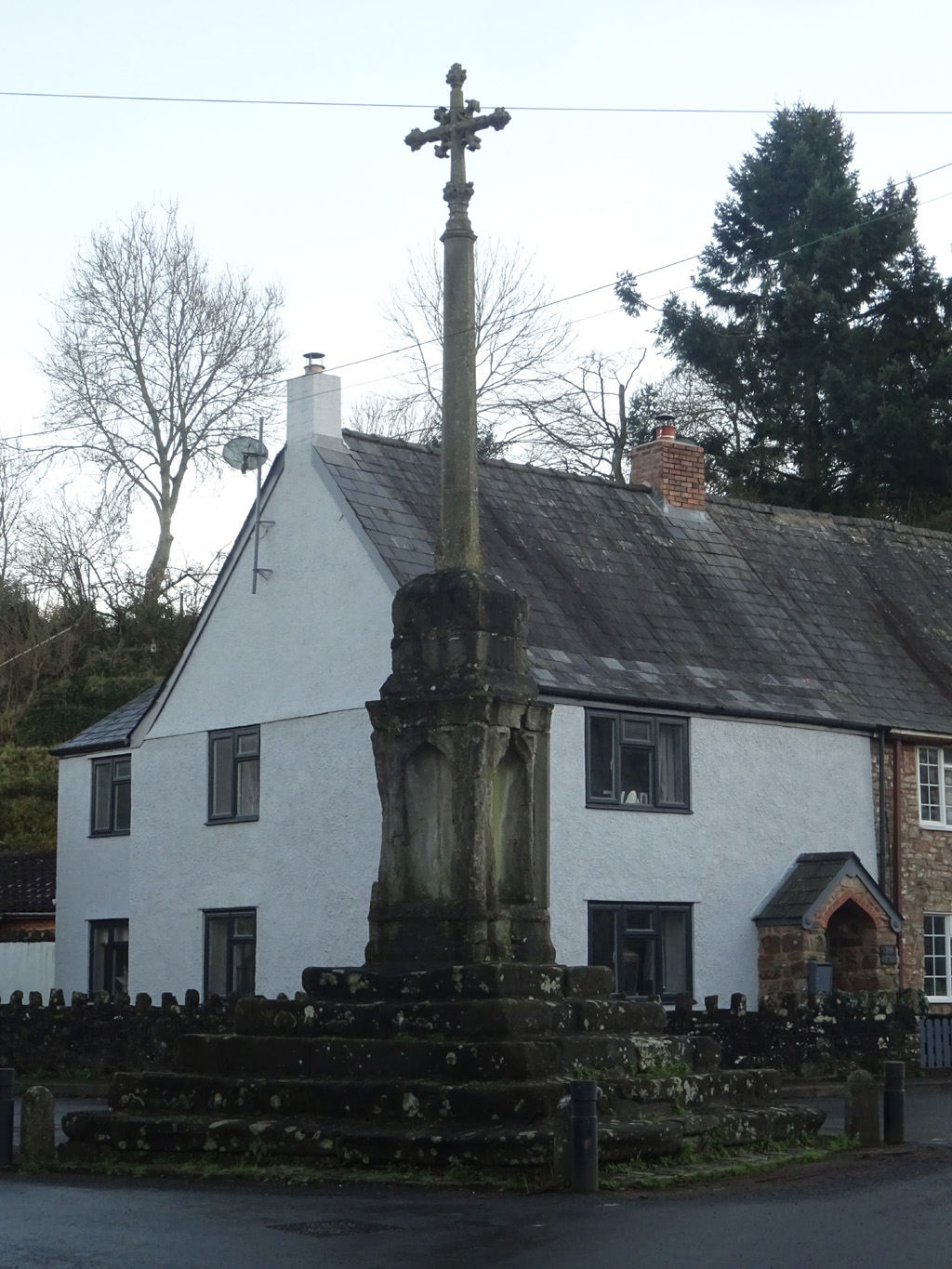
Village Cross, Clearwell

In 1684 the manor was purchased by Francis Wyndham (d.1716) of Uffords Manor, Norfolk. Francis's grandfather Sir George Wyndham (6th son of Sir John Wyndham (d.1645) of Orchard Wyndham, Williton, Somerset) was an adherent to the Commonwealth during the Civil War and had served as a commissioner for raising the assessment under Thomas Fairfax, in 1644. Sir John's eldest surviving son had married Catherine Hopton, one of the daughters of Robert Hopton of Witham, and the sister of the wife of Sir Baynham Throckmorton, 2nd Baronet. George married after 1631 Ann, the widow of James Underwood (d.1631) of Uffords Manor (alias Egmers), Cromer, Norfolk, from whom he inherited Uffords. He married secondly Frances Davy. His son by Anne was Francis Wyndham, whose son by his wife Frances Davell was Francis Wyndham (d.1716). Clearwell passed to Francis's eldest son John (d.1725), then to John's brother Thomas Wyndham (d.1752). Thomas Wyndham demolished the house depicted in 1712 by Johannes Kip and built in its place the present neo-Gothic mock-castle, Clearwell Castle, designed by Roger Morris (d.1749). In the mid-19th century, the interior of the Court was refurbished by Caroline, Countess of Dunraven (d. 1870), wife of Windham Quin, 2nd Earl of Dunraven and Mount-Earl (d. 1850) and daughter of another Thomas Wyndham, who held Clearwell from 1814 to her death in 1870, to the designs of John Middleton. The terracing of the gardens was probably also carried out at this time.

=== Collins, Gardner, Vereker, Yeates ===
In 1893 Clearwell was sold to Henry Collins, whose mortgagees sold it in 1907 to its then tenant Col. Alan Gardner. In 1908 the house was renamed Clearwell Castle. In 1911, it was sold to Charles Vereker (d.1947) (later Colonel), under whose ownership it suffered a major fire in 1929 but was restored. Following Col. Vereker's death in 1947, the property was purchased by Gloucestershire County Council which sold it on to a demolition contractor who removed the lead roof, floors and fittings. The castle was destined for demolition when in about 1952 it was bought by Frank Yeates, the son of a former gardener on the estate, who restored it. The Yeates family sold the castle in the 1980s. In 1994 it was bought by Richard Morley, a computer consultant, who ran it as a commune. The castle was subsequently bought by Harry Bramer and is run as a wedding venue.

== Sources ==
- MacLean, Sir John, The History of the Manors of Dean Magna and Abenhall. Published in: Transactions of the Bristol and Gloucestershire Archaeological Society, Vol.6, 1881-2, pp. 185-187, pedigree of Baynham
- 'Newland', Victoria County History, Gloucestershire, Vol. 5, (1996), Bledisloe Hundred, St. Briavels Hundred, The Forest of Dean, pp. 195–231
- Forest of Dean: Industry, Victoria County History, Gloucestershire, Vol. 5, (1996), Bledisloe Hundred, St. Briavels Hundred, The Forest of Dean, pp. 326–354
