= George Berkeley, 1st Earl of Berkeley =

English merchant, politician and peer (1628–1698)

The Right Honourable The Earl of Berkeley PC FRS
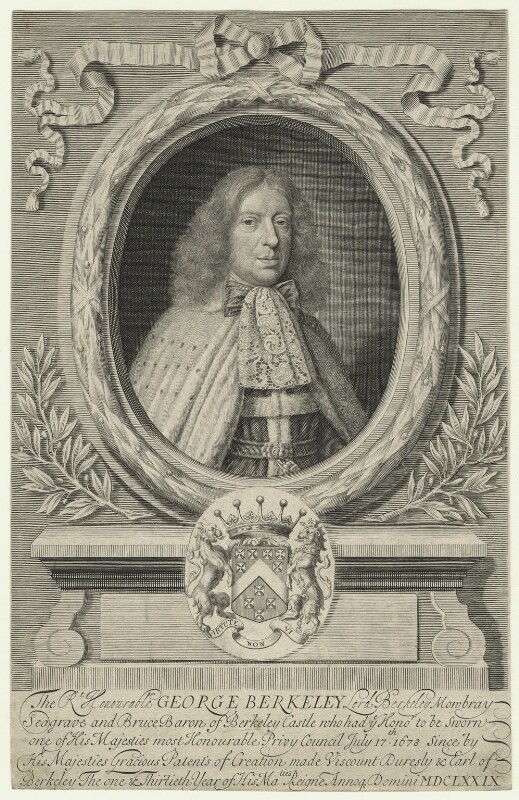

Personal details
- Born: c. 1628 England
- Died: 10 October 1698 (aged 69–70) England
- Resting place: Cranford, Middlesex
- Spouse: Elizabeth Massingberd (m. 1646)
- Children: 7, including Charles and Henrietta
- Parent(s): George Berkeley, 8th Baron Berkeley; Elizabeth Stanhope

George Berkeley, 1st Earl of Berkeley, PC, FRS (c. 1628 – 10 October 1698) was an English merchant, politician and peer who sat in the House of Commons of England from 1654 until 1658.

== Life ==
Berkeley was the son of George Berkeley, 8th Baron Berkeley (d. 1658), and his wife, Elizabeth Stanhope, daughter of Sir Michael Stanhope. Berkeley was a canon-commoner at Christ Church, Oxford, but did not take any degree. In 1654 he was elected Member of Parliament for Gloucestershire in the First Protectorate Parliament. He was re-elected MP for Gloucestershire in 1656 for the Second Protectorate Parliament.

Berkeley succeeded to the barony in 1658, and was nominated in May 1660 as one of the commissioners to proceed to the Hague and invite Charles II to return to the kingdom. In the following November he was made keeper of the house gardens and parks of Nonsuch Palace, where the Duchess of Cleveland later lived.

In 1661 Berkeley was placed on the council for foreign plantations. In 1663 he became a member of the Royal African Company on its formation (10 January), acquiring a share in the territory lying between Salé and the Cape of Good Hope. In the same year he was elected Fellow of the Royal Society. He was made a privy councillor in 1677. In April 1678, he was made a member of the Board of Trade and plantations which had been established in 1668.

On 11 September 1679 he was created Viscount Dursley and Earl of Berkeley. He was elected to the governorship of the Levant Company on 9 February 1680 and held the position for most, if not the whole, of his subsequent life. In May 1681 he was elected one of the masters of Trinity House. At this time he was a member of the East India Company. In February 1685 he was appointed Custos Rotulorum of Gloucestershire, and 21 July 1685 was sworn of the privy council. After the flight of James II, 11 December 1688, Berkeley was among the lords who assembled at Guildhall and declared themselves a provisional government. He was nominated as ambassador to Constantinople on 16 July 1698, but not wishing to go, petitioned parliament to be excused the office. He died in England and was buried in the parish church of Cranford, Middlesex, where he had an estate.

== Works ==
He published in 1668 a religious work entitled Historical Applications and Occasional Meditations upon several Subjects.

== Family ==
Berkeley married on 11 August 1646, Elizabeth Massingberd, daughter of John Massingberd, treasurer of the East India Company, by whom he had two sons, Charles and George, and six daughters:

- Charles Berkeley, 2nd Earl of Berkeley (8 April 1649 – 24 September 1710)
- Rev. Hon. George Berkeley (d. 1694); graduated M.A. at Christ Church, 9 July 1669, took holy orders, and became a prebendary of Westminster, 13 July 1687, married Jane Cole and had issue
- Lady Elizabeth Berkeley (c. 1650 – d. 1681); married William Smythe Esq. (c. 1645 – d. 1720) and had issue.
  - Theophilia Smythe; married on 4 November 1696 in Westminster Abbey Arthur Moore MP and had issue, including James Moore Smythe, William Moore M.P. for Banbury, and Arthur Moore Smythe.
  - Elizabeth (Moore) Ormond, married 1718 Wyriott Ormond Sr. of London No: 11 Meard St. London and Bath N.C. Colonial Official and had issue, including Roger Ormond or Ormand.
- Lady Theophilia Berkeley (1650 – 26 January 1706/7), married Sir Kingsmill Lucy, 2nd Baronet, and had issue. She married, secondly, Robert Nelson.
- Lady Arabella Berkeley; married Sir William Pulteney, son and heir of Sir William Pulteney, Bt., of Misterton, and had issue.
- Lady Mary Berkeley (d. 19 May 1719); married, firstly, Ford Grey, 1st Earl of Tankerville, and had issue. Married, secondly, after 22 May 1712, Richard Rooth.
- Lady Henrietta Berkeley (b. c. 1664 – 1706); unmarried, famously seduced by her sister's husband, the Earl of Tankerville, in 1681.
- Lady Arethusa Berkeley (d. 11 February 1742/3); married Charles Boyle, 3rd Viscount Dungarvan, and had issue.

== Arms ==
Coat of arms of George Berkeley, 1st Earl of Berkeley
Crest A mitre, gules, labelled and garnished or, charged with a chevron and crosses-patée, as in the arms. Escutcheon Gules a chevron between ten crosses patee, six in chief and four in base, argent. Supporters Two lions, argent, the sinister ducally crowned gules, collared and chained gold. Motto Virtute non vi (By virtue, not by force).

Parliament of England
Preceded by John Crofts; Robert Holmes; William Neast	Member of Parliament for Gloucestershire; 1654–1656; With: John Howe; Matthew Hale 1654; Christopher Guise 1654; Sylvanus Wood 1654; Baynham Throckmorton 1656; John Crofts 1656; William Neast 1656	Succeeded by John Grobham Howe; John Stephens
Honorary titles
Interregnum	Custos Rotulorum of Gloucestershire; 1660–1689	Succeeded by Viscount Dursley
Preceded by The Viscount Mordaunt	Custos Rotulorum of Surrey; 1675–1689	Succeeded by Henry Howard
Preceded by Henry Howard	Custos Rotulorum of Surrey; 1689–1698	Succeeded by The 2nd Earl of Berkeley
Peerage of England
New creation	Earl of Berkeley; 1679–1698	Succeeded by Charles Berkeley
Preceded by George Berkeley	Baron Berkeley (descended by acceleration); 1658–1689	Succeeded by Charles Berkeley
