= Matthew Hale (jurist) =

English jurist and scholar (1609–1676)

Sir Matthew Hale SL
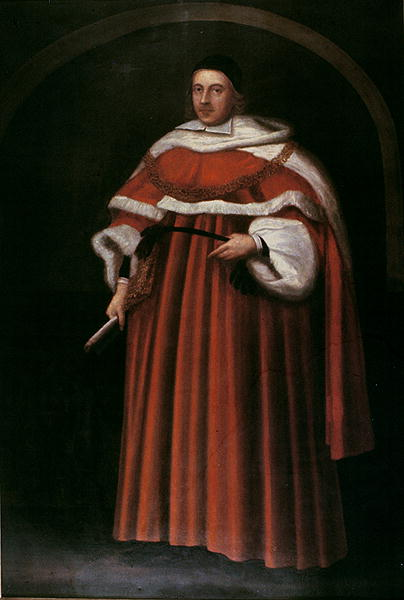
- 1670 portrait of Hale by John Wright

Chief Justice of the King's Bench
- In office 18 May 1671 – 20 February 1676
- Preceded by: John Kelynge
- Succeeded by: Richard Raynsford

Chief Baron of the Exchequer
- In office 7 November 1660 – 1671
- Preceded by: Orlando Bridgeman
- Succeeded by: Edward Turnour

Justice of the Common Pleas
- In office 31 January 1653 – 15 May 1659
- Preceded by: John Puleston
- Succeeded by: John Archer

Personal details
- Born: 1 November 1609 Alderley, Gloucestershire
- Died: 25 December 1676 (aged 67) Alderley, Gloucestershire
- Spouse(s): Anne Moore; Anne Bishop
- Education: Magdalen Hall, Oxford (now Hertford College)

Sir Matthew Hale (1 November 1609 – 25 December 1676) was an influential English lawyer, most noted for his treatise Historia Placitorum Coronæ, or The History of the Pleas of the Crown. He occupied various public offices both under the Cromwellian Commonwealth and the Stuart Restoration. From 1671 until his retirement in 1676, he served as Chief Justice of the King's Bench. Hale is widely regarded as one of the key figures in the development of the common law.

Born to a barrister and his wife, who had both died by the time he was 5, Hale was raised by his father's relative, a strict Puritan, and inherited his faith. In 1626 he matriculated at Magdalen Hall, Oxford (now Hertford College), intending to become a priest. He was later persuaded to become a barrister, like his father, by an encounter with a Serjeant-at-Law in a dispute over his estate. On 8 November 1628, he joined Lincoln's Inn, where he was called to the Bar on 17 May 1636. As a barrister, Hale represented several Royalist figures in the prelude to the English Civil War and during the war itself. These included the Earl of Strafford and Archbishop Laud. It has been hypothesised that Hale was intended to represent Charles I at his trial and that he conceived the defence used by the king.

Despite the defeat of the Royalists, Hale's reputation for integrity and his political neutrality protected him under the Commonwealth. He became Chairman of the Hale Commission that investigated law reform. Following the Commission's dissolution, Oliver Cromwell appointed him Justice of the Common Pleas. Hale sat in Parliament, either in the Commons or in the Upper House, in every Parliament from the First Protectorate Parliament (1654–1655) to the Convention Parliament (1660). After the Declaration of Breda, Hale was the Member of Parliament who moved to consider restoring the crown to Charles II. Under Charles, Hale was made first Chief Baron of the Exchequer and then Chief Justice of the King's Bench. In both positions, he was again noted for his integrity, although not as a particularly innovative judge. Following a bout of illness he retired on 20 February 1676, dying ten months later on 25 December 1676.

Hale's published works were particularly influential in the development of English common law. His Historia Placitorum Coronæ, dealing with capital offences against the Crown, is considered "of the highest authority", while his Analysis of the Common Law is noted as the first published history of English law and a major influence on William Blackstone's Commentaries on the Laws of England. Hale's jurisprudence struck a middle-ground between Edward Coke's "appeal to reason" and John Selden's "appeal to contract", while refuting elements of Thomas Hobbes's theory of natural law. Hale influentially wrote that a man could not be charged with marital rape, a principle famously overturned in the case of R v R. Modern commentators have criticized Hale for presiding over the 1662 Bury St Edmunds witch trial, which led to the execution of two women, and for his argument that capital punishment could extend to those as young as fourteen. In addition to his legal writings, Hale also published several works on Aristotelian physics.

== Life ==
=== Early life and education ===
Hale was born on 1 November 1609 in West End House (now known as The Grange or Alderley Grange) in Alderley, Gloucestershire to Robert Hale, a barrister of Lincoln's Inn, and Joanna Poyntz. His father gave up his practice as a barrister several years before Hale's birth "because he could not understand the reason of giving colour in pleadings". This refers to a process through which the defendant would refer a case over the validity of his title to land to a judge instead of a jury, through claiming a (false) allegation about this right. Such an allegation would be a question of law rather than a question of fact, and as such decided by the judge with no reference to the jurors.

Although in common use, Robert Hale apparently saw this as deceptive and "contrary to the exactness of truth and justice which became a Christian; so that he withdrew himself from the inns of court to live on his estate in the country". John Hostettler, in his biography of Matthew Hale, points out that his father's concerns about giving colour in pleadings could not have been very strong "since he not only retired to his estate at Alderley where he managed to live on his wife's inherited income, but also directed in his will that Matthew should make a career in the law".

Both of Hale's parents died before he was five; Joanna in 1612, and Robert in 1614. It was then revealed that Robert had been so generous in giving money to the poor that at his death his estate provided only £100 of income a year, of which £20 was to be paid to the local poor. Hale thus passed into the care of Anthony Kingscot, one of his father's relatives. A strong Puritan, Kingscot had Hale taught by a Mr. Stanton, the vicar of Wotton known as the "scandalous vicar" due to his extremist puritan views. On 20 October 1626, at the age of 16, Hale matriculated at the University of Oxford as a member of Magdalen Hall.

Both Kingscot and Stanton had intended this to be his career, and his education had been conducted with that in mind. He was taught by Obadiah Sedgwick, another Puritan, and excelled in both his studies and fencing. Hale also regularly attended church, private prayer-meetings, and was described as "simple in his attire, and rather aesthetic". After a company of actors came to Oxford, Hale attended so many plays and other social activities that his studies began to suffer, and he began to turn away from Puritanism. In light of this, he abandoned his desire to become a priest and instead decided to become a soldier. His relatives were unable to persuade him to become a priest, or even a lawyer, with Hale describing lawyers as "a barbarous set of people unfit for anything but their own trade".

His plans to become a soldier died after a legal battle concerning his estate, in which he consulted John Glanville. Glanville successfully persuaded Hale to become a lawyer, and, after leaving Oxford at the age of 20 before obtaining a degree, he joined Lincoln's Inn on 8 November 1628. Fearing that the theatre might dissuade him from his legal studies as it had at Oxford, he swore "never to see a stage-play again". At around this time he was drinking with a group of friends when one of them became so drunk he fainted; Hale prayed to God to forgive and save his friend, and forgive him for his previous excesses. His friend recovered, and Hale was restored to his Puritan faith, never drinking to someone's health again (not even drinking to the King) and going to church every Sunday for 36 years. He instead settled into his studies, working for up to 16 hours a day during his first two years at Lincoln's Inn before reducing it to eight hours due to health concerns. As well as reading the law reports and statutes, Hale also studied the Roman civil law and jurisprudence. Outside of the law, Hale studied anatomy, history, philosophy and mathematics. He refused to read the news or attend social events, and occupied himself entirely with his studies and visits to church.

=== Civil War, Commonwealth and Protectorate ===
==== Barrister ====
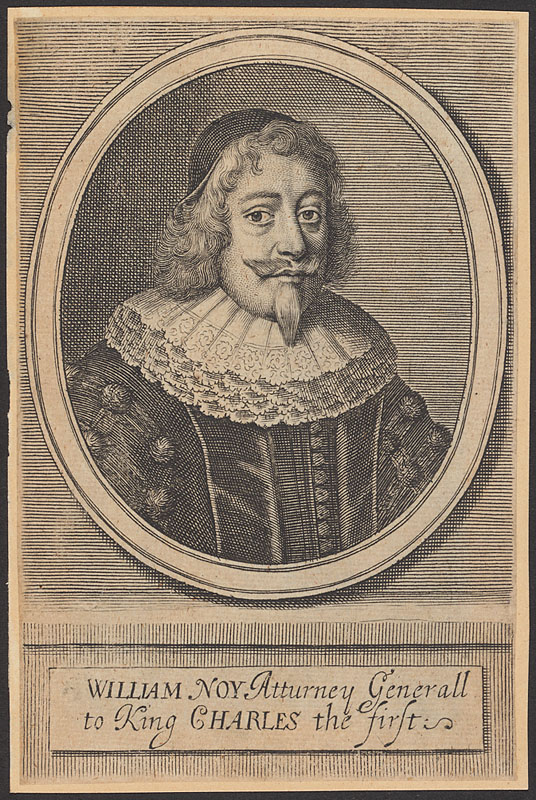
William Noy, whom Hale served as a pupil

On 17 May 1636, Hale was called to the Bar by Lincoln's Inn, and immediately became the pupil of William Noy. Hale and Noy became close friends, to the point where he was referred to as "the young Noy", and more crucially he also met and befriended John Selden, a "man of almost universal learning, whose theories were to dominate much of [Hale's] later thought". Selden persuaded him to continue with his studies outside the law, and much of Hale's written work is concerned with theology and science as well as legal theory.

Hale gained a good legal practice, although he allowed his Christian faith to govern his work. He sought to help the court reach a just verdict, whatever his client's concerns, and normally returned half his fee or charged a standard fee of 10 shillings rather than allow costs to inflate. He refused to accept unjust cases, and always tried to be on the "right" side of any case; John Campbell wrote that "If he saw that a cause was unjust, he for a great while would not meddle further in it but to give his advice that it was so; if the parties after that would go on, they were to seek another counsellor, for he would assist none in acts of injustice".

Despite this, he was wealthy enough to purchase land worth £4,200 in 1648 (equivalent to £623,267 in 2025). He was in great demand; law reporters began recording his cases and in 1641 he advised Thomas Wentworth, the first Earl of Strafford, over his attainder for high treason. Although unsuccessful, Hale was then called to represent William Laud, the Archbishop of Canterbury, during his impeachment by the House of Lords in October 1644.

Hale, along with John Herne, argued that none of Laud's alleged offences constituted treason, and that the Treason Act 1351 had abolished all common law treasons. John Wilde, arguing for the prosecution, admitted that none of Laud's actions amounted to treason, but argued that all of them together did. Herne, in his arguments written by Hale, retorted that "I crave your mercy, [Wilde]. I never understood before this time that two hundred couple of black rabbits would make a black horse!" The case against Laud began to fail, but Parliament issued an Act of Attainder which declared him guilty, and sentenced him to death.

When it became clear that the King was losing the Civil War, and only Oxford held out, Hale decided to act as a commissioner to negotiate its surrender, fearing that the city might otherwise be destroyed. Thanks to his intercession, honourable terms were reached, and the libraries preserved. Despite practising in the politically charged environment of the Civil War and primarily defending opponents of the resulting Commonwealth of England, Hale's reputation did not suffer. First, he largely kept out of the war, even ignoring news of its progress, and instead translating The Life and Death of Pomponious Atticus into English.

After the capture of Charles I, Hale was expected to defend him, and indeed offered to do so; the King refused to submit to the court, claiming he did not recognise its jurisdiction. Edward Foss writes, based on the statement of Charles Runnington, that it was Hale who actually provided the King with this defence, and that it was only because the defence prevented any counsel being called for the King that Hale did not appear in court.

Second, he was acknowledged as universally able and of high integrity during his cases, retorting to those who complained of his defence of the Royalists that he was "pleading in defence of the laws which they professed they would maintain and preserve; and that he was doing his duty to his client and was not to be daunted by such threatenings".

==== Hale Commission ====
During the rule of both the Commonwealth and the Protectorate, there was considerable desire for law reform. Many judges and lawyers were corrupt, and the criminal law followed no real reason or philosophy. Any felony was punishable by death, proceedings were in a form of Norman French, and judges regularly imprisoned juries for reaching a verdict they disagreed with.

Oliver Cromwell and the Rump Parliament aimed to establish a "new society", which included reforming the law. To that end, on 30 January 1652 Hale was appointed chairman of a commission to investigate law reform, which soon became known as the Hale Commission. The Commission's official remit was defined by the Commons; "taking into consideration what inconveniences there are in the law; and how the mischiefs which grow from delays, the chargeableness and irregularities in the proceedings in the law may be prevented, and the speediest way to reform the same, and to present their opinions to such committee as the Parliament shall appoint". The Commission consisted of eight lawyers and 13 laymen, which sat from 23 January approximately three times a week.

The Commission recommended various changes, such as reducing the use of the death penalty, allowing defendants access to legal counsel, legal aid and the abolition of peine forte et dure as a torture mechanism. Dissolved on 23 July 1652 after producing 16 bills, none of the Commission's recommendations immediately made it into law, although two (to abolish fines for original writs and to develop procedures for civil marriages) were brought into force through statutes by the Barebone's Parliament. Almost all of the recommendations eventually became part of English law, with John Hostettler, in his biography of Hale, writing that if the measures had been put into law immediately, "we would have been honouring such pioneers for their farsightedness in enhancing our legal system and the concept of justice".

==== Justice of the Common Pleas ====
Oliver Cromwell, noting Hale's abilities, asked him to become a Justice of the Common Pleas. Although Hale considered that taking this commission would make others think he supported the Commonwealth, he was persuaded to do so, replacing John Puleston. Only Serjeants-at-Law could become judges, and as such Hale was made a Serjeant on 25 January 1653. He was formally appointed a Justice of the Court of Common Pleas, one of the three principal Westminster courts, on 31 January 1653, on the condition that he "would not be required to acknowledge the usurper's authority". He also refused to put people to death for offences against the government; he believed that because the government authorising him to do so was an illegal one, "putting men to death on that account was murder". William Blackstone later wrote that "if judgment of death be given by a judge not authorized by lawful commission, and execution is done accordingly, the judge is guilty of murder; and upon this argument Sir Matthew Hale himself, though he accepted the place of a judge of the Common Pleas under Cromwell's government, yet declined to sit on the crown side at the assizes, and try prisoners, having very strong objections to the legality of the usurper's commission". Hale also made decisions which negatively impacted on the Commonwealth, executing a soldier for murdering a civilian in 1655, and actively refusing to attend a court hearing outside term time. On another occasion, Cromwell personally selected a jury in a trial he was concerned with, something contrary to law; as a result, Hale dismissed the jury and refused to hear the case. On 15 May 1659, Hale chose to retire, and was replaced by John Archer.

==== Member of Parliament ====
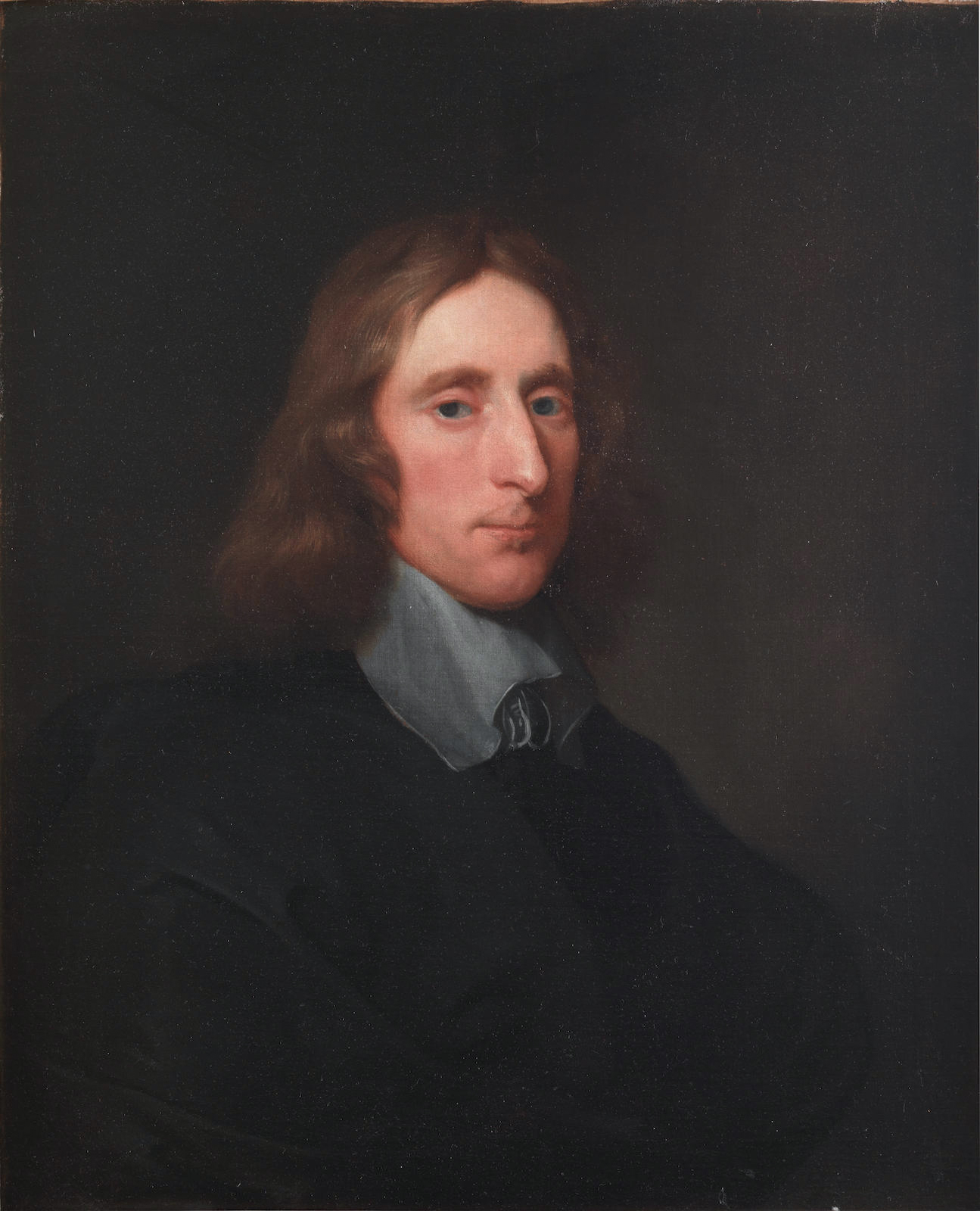
Richard Cromwell, who summoned the Third Protectorate Parliament

On 3 September 1654, the First Protectorate Parliament was called; of the 400 English members, only two were lawyers – Hooke, a Baron of the Exchequer, and Hale, who was elected Member of Parliament for his home county of Gloucestershire. Hale was an active MP, persuading the Commons to reject a motion to destroy the Tower of London's archives, and introducing several motions to preserve the authority of Parliament.

The first was that the government should be "in a Parliament and a single person limited and restrained as the Parliament should think fit", and he later proposed that the English Council of State be subject to re-election every three years by the House of Commons, that the militia should be controlled by Parliament, and that supplies should only be granted to the army for limited periods. While these proposals got support, Cromwell refused to allow any MPs into the Commons until they signed an oath recognising his authority, which Hale refused to do. As such, none of them were passed. Dissatisfied with the First Protectorate Parliament, Cromwell dissolved it on 22 January 1655.

A Second Protectorate Parliament was called on 17 September 1656, which wrote a constitution titled Humble Petition and Advice that called for the creation of an Upper House to perform the job of the former House of Lords. Cromwell accepted this constitution, and in December 1657 nominated the Upper House's members. Hale, as a judge, was called to it. This new House's extensive jurisdiction and authority was immediately questioned by the Commons, and Cromwell responded by dissolving the Parliament on 4 February 1658. On 3 September 1658, Oliver Cromwell died and was replaced by his son, Richard Cromwell. Richard Cromwell summoned a new Parliament on 27 January 1659, and Hale was returned as MP for Oxford University. Richard Cromwell was a weak leader, however, and ruled for only 8 months before resigning. On 16 March 1660 General Monck forced the Parliament to vote for its own dissolution and call new elections.

At the same time, Charles II made the Declaration of Breda, and when the Convention Parliament met on 25 April 1660 (with Hale a member from Gloucestershire again) it immediately began negotiations with the King. Hale moved in the Commons that "a committee might be appointed to look into the overtures that had been made, and the concessions that had been offered, by [Charles I]" and "from thence to digest such propositions, as they should think fit to be sent over to [Charles II]" who was still in Breda. On 1 May Parliament restored the King, and Charles II landed in Dover three weeks later, prompting the English Restoration.

=== English Restoration ===
==== Chief Baron and Chief Justice ====
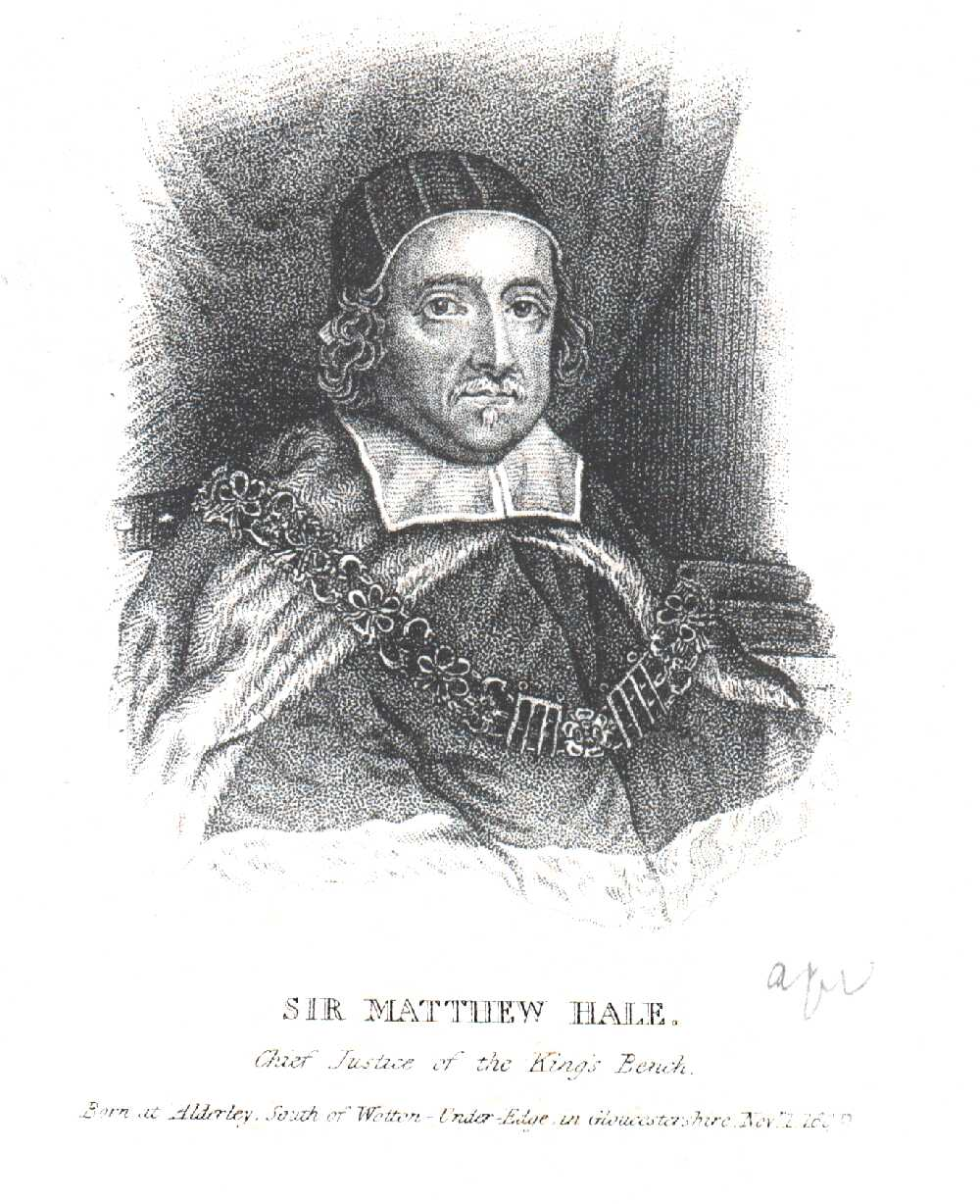
Hale as Chief Justice of the King's Bench

Hale's first task in the new regime was as part of the Special Commission of 37 judges who tried the 29 regicides not included in the Declaration of Breda, between 9 and 19 October 1660. All were found guilty of treason, and 10 of them were hanged, drawn and quartered. Sitting as a judge in this trial led to some viewing Hale as hypocritical, with F. A. Inderwick later writing "I confess to a feeling of pain at finding [Hale] in October 1660, sitting as a judge at the Old Bailey, trying and condemning to death batches of the regicides, men under whose orders he had himself acted, who had been his colleagues in Parliament, with whom he had sat on committees to alter the law". Perhaps as reward for this, he became Chief Baron of the Exchequer on 7 November 1660, replacing Sir Orlando Bridgeman. Hale had no wish to receive the knighthood that accompanied this appointment and so tried to avoid being near the King; in response, the Lord Chancellor Lord Clarendon invited him to his house, where the King was present. Hale was knighted on the spot.

There were many instances of parties to a case attempting to bribe Hale. When a Duke approached him before a case "to help the judge understand a case that was to come before him", Hale said that he would only hear about cases in court. In another case, he was sent venison by a party. After noticing the man's name and verifying that he had indeed sent Hale some venison, Hale refused to let the case proceed until he had paid the man for the food. When Sir John Croke, suspected in engaging in a conspiracy, sent him some sugar loaves to excuse his absence from a case, Hale remarked that "I cannot think that Sir John believes that the King's Justices come into the country to take bribes. Some other person, having a design to put a trick upon him, sent them in his name". Hale returned the loaves, and refused to continue until Croke appeared before him. Hale was noted during this period for giving latitude to those accused of religious impropriety, and through doing so "secured the confidence and affection of all classes of his countrymen". His knowledge of equity was considered as great as his knowledge of the law, and Lord Nottingham, considered the "father of equity", "worshipped Hale as a great master".

On 2 September 1666, the Great Fire of London broke out. Over 100,000 people were made homeless, and by the time the fire ended over 13,000 houses and 400 streets had been destroyed. An Act of Parliament enacted on 8 February 1667 constituted a Court of Fire, tasked with dealing with property disputes over ownership, liability and the rebuilding of the city. Hale was tasked with sitting in this court, which met in Clifford's Inn, and heard 140 of the 374 cases the court dealt with during its first year in operation.

On 18 May 1671, Hale was made Chief Justice of the King's Bench after the death of John Kelynge. Edward Turnour replaced him as Chief Baron of the Exchequer. Hale was not noted as a particularly innovative judge, but took pains to ensure that his decisions were easy to understand and informative. Roger North wrote that "I have known the Court of King's Bench sitting every day from eight to 12, and the Lord Chief Justice Hale's managing matters of law to all imaginable advantage to the students, and in that he took a pleasure or rather pride; he encouraged arguing when it was to the purpose, and used to debate with counsel, so that the court might have been taken for an academy of sciences as well as the seat of justice". He was noted for allowing counsel to fix any problems with pleadings, and for letting them correct him if he made an error in his summing up. He disliked eloquence, writing that "If the judge or jury has a right understanding it signifies nothing but a waste of time and loss of words, and if they are weak, and easily wrought upon, it is a more decent way of corrupting them by bribing their fancies and biassing their affections." As a judge, however, he was noted by Lord Nottingham as the greatest orator on the bench.

==== Retirement and death ====
By 1675, Hale had begun to suffer from ill-health; his arms became swollen, and although a course of bloodletting relieved the pain temporarily, by the next February his legs were so stiff he could not walk. His initial attempts to resign as Chief Justice were declined by the King, but when Hale applied for a writ of ease the King reluctantly allowed him to retire on 20 February 1676, granting him a pension of £1,000 a year. He was replaced as Chief Justice by Richard Raynsford. After suffering for ten more months, Hale died on 25 December 1676 at his country home, The Lower House (now the site of the present day Alderley House). He was buried next to his first wife's tomb in the churchyard of St Kenelm's, the church which adjoined his home at Alderley, with a monument erected that reads:

Here is buried the body of Matthew Hale, Knight, the only son of Robert Hale, and Joanna his wife; born in this parish of Alderley on the 1st day of November, in the year of our Lord 1609, and died in the same place on the 25th day of December in the year of our lord 1676; in the 67th year of his age.

His estate was largely left for his widow, with his legal texts given to his grandson Gabriel if Gabriel chose to study the law, and his more valuable manuscripts and books given to Lincoln's Inn. The male line of his family died out in 1784 with the death of Matthew Hale, his great grandson; also a barrister.

=== Personal life ===
In 1642 Hale married Anne Moore, the daughter of Sir Henry Moore, a Royalist soldier, and the granddaughter of Sir Francis Moore, a Serjeant-at-Law under James I. Moore and Hale had 10 children, but she was evidently a highly extravagant woman, with Hale warning his children that "an idle or expensive wife is most times an ill bargain, though she bring a great portion". Moore died in 1658, and in 1667 Hale married Anne Bishop, his housekeeper. Descriptions of Bishop differ; Roger North wrote that "[Hale] was unfortunate in his family; for he married his own servant made, and then, for an excuse, said there was no wisdom below the girdle".

Richard Baxter, on the other hand, described Anne as "one of [Hale's] own judgment and temper, prudent and loving, and fit to please him; and that would not draw on him the trouble of much acquaintance and relations". Hale himself described her as a "most dutiful, faithful, and loving wife" who was appointed an executrix on his death.

== Legacy ==
Hale's views on rape, marriage and abortion have had a long legacy not only in Britain's legal system, but also in those of the British Colonies.

According to Edward Foss in 1870 Hale was widely considered an excellent judge and jurist, particularly through his writings: he was an "eminent judge, whom all look up to as one of the brightest luminaries of the law, as well for the soundness of his learning as for the excellence of his life". Similarly, John Campbell in his Lives of the Chief Justices of England, wrote that Hale was "one of the most pure, the most pious, the most independent, and the most learned" of judges.

In 1908 Henry Flanders, described Hale in the University of Pennsylvania Law Review, during his lifetime as "the most learned, the most able, the most honorable man to be found in the profession of the law".

Hale's writings have been cited by the US Supreme Court on numerous occasions. Justice Harry Blackmun cited Hale in "Roe v. Wade". Justices Elena Kagan and Stephen Breyer in "Kahler v. Kansas". In 2022, Hale's opinion on abortion was cited by Samuel Alito in his opinion of Dobbs v. Jackson Women's Health Organization, generating political controversy.

In 1993, in the case of R v Kingston, the Court of Appeal relied on his statement that "drunkenness is not a defence" to uphold a conviction. William Holdsworth argued in 1923 that it was his learning in Roman law and jurisprudence which allowed him to work so effectively; because he had seen other legal systems at work, he "could both criticise the defects of English law and state its rules in a more orderly form than they had ever been stated before". Hale's political neutrality and personal integrity has been attributed by Berman in 1994 to his Puritanism, and his support of the common law; "Regimes come and go, the common law abides...For Hale...legal continuity was vital for civic identity".

Hale has frequently been compared with Edward Coke. Campbell considered Hale to be the superior lawyer, because while he failed to engage in public life he treated law as a science, and maintained judicial independence and neutrality. In 2002, Hostettler said, while considering Hale a better lawyer than Coke and more influential, that Coke was better overall. While Hale was in possession of judicial impartiality, and his written works are considered highly important, his lack of venture into public affairs limited his progressive influence. Coke's active intervention allowed him to "breath new life into medieval law and use it to oppose conciliar justice", encouraging judges to be more independent and "unfettered except by the common law whose supremacy it was their duty to uphold".

J. H. Corbett wrote in the Alberta Law Quarterly in 1942, that with Hale's popularity at the time (Parliamentary constituencies "fought over the privilege of returning him") he could have been just as successful as Coke if he had chosen to take an active role in public affairs.

=== Writings ===
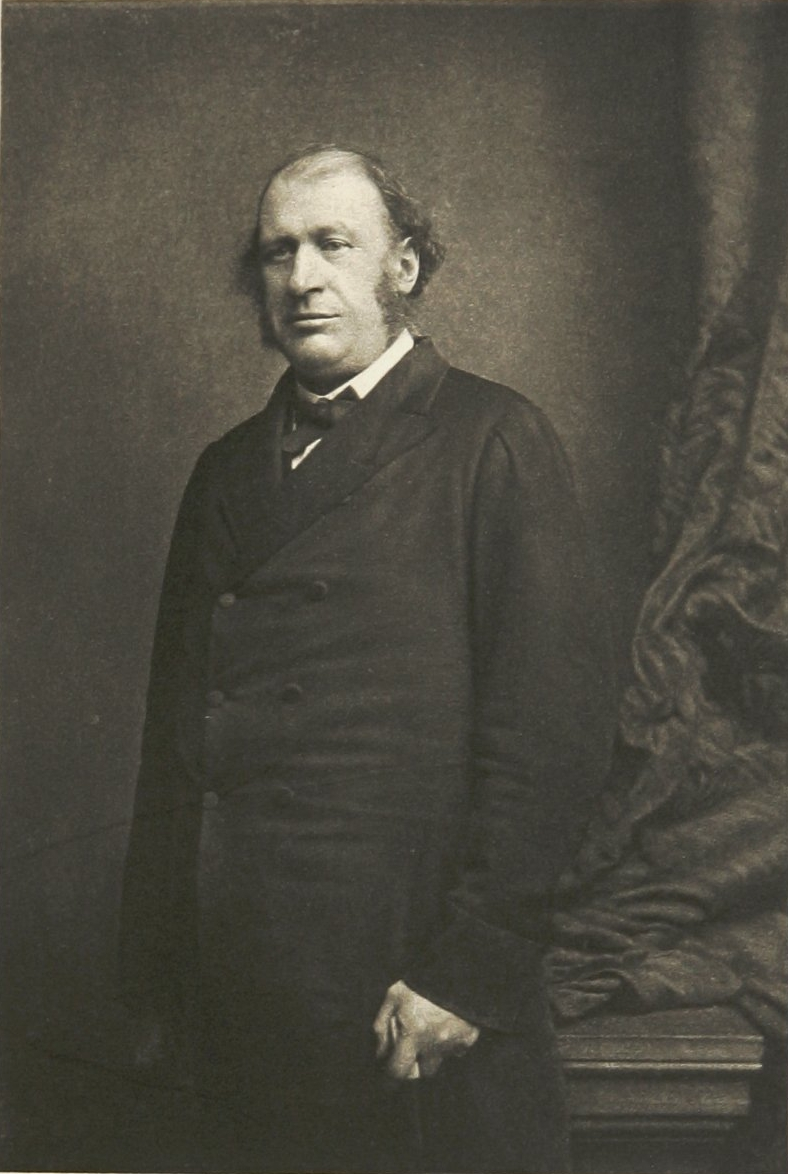
James Fitzjames Stephen, who praised Hale's Historia Placitorum Coronæ

Hale's posthumous legacy is his written work. He wrote a variety of texts, treatises and manuscripts, the most major of which are The History and Analysis of the Common Law of England (published 1713), and the Historia Placitorum Coronæ, or The History of the Pleas of the Crown (published 1736).

The Analysis was based on lectures he gave to students, and was most likely not intended to be published; it is considered the first history of English law ever written. Divided into 13 chapters, the book dealt with the history of English law and some suggestions for reform. William Blackstone, when writing his Commentaries on the Laws of England, noted in his preface that "of all the earlier schemes for digesting the Laws of England the most natural and scientific, as well as the most comprehensive, appeared to be that of Sir Matthew Hale in his posthumous Analysis of the Law". Hale proposed the creation of county courts, and also drew a strong distinction between written laws, such as statutes, and customary, unwritten laws. He also argued that the common law was subject to Parliament, far before the confirmation of Parliamentary supremacy, and that the law should protect the rights and civil liberties of the King's subjects. He also argued for the confirmation of trial by jury, which he described as "the best mode of trial in the world", while the 13th chapter divided the law into the laws of persons and of property, and dealt with the rights, wrongs and remedies recognised by the law at the time. William Holdsworth, himself considered one of the greatest common law historians, described it as "the ablest introductory sketch of a history of English law that appeared till the publication of Pollock and Maitland's volumes in 1895".

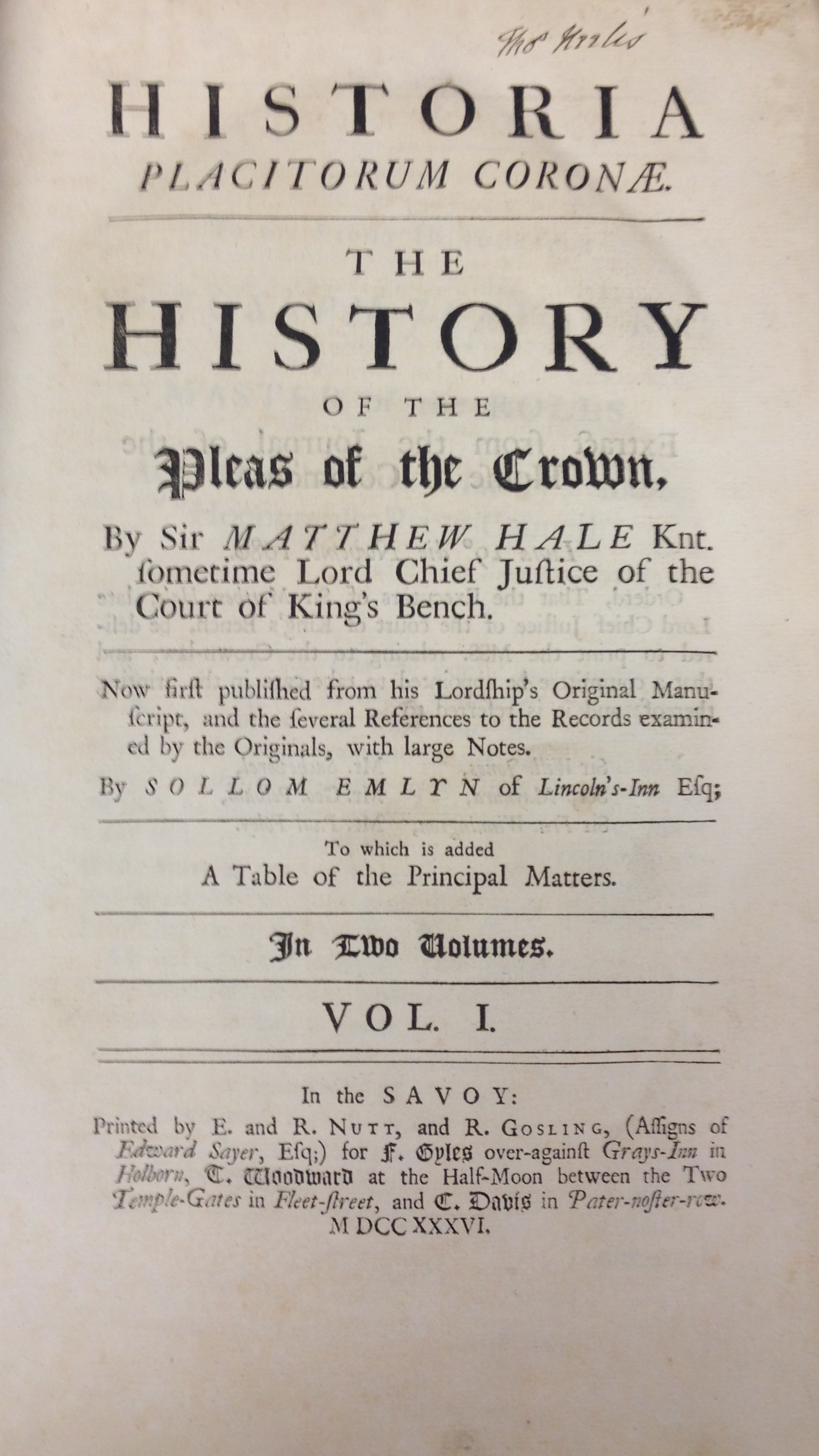
The title page of volume I of the first edition of Historia Placitorum Coronae (1736)

The Historia is perhaps Hale's most famous work. Pleas of the Crown were capital offences committed "against the peace of our Lord the King, his Crown and dignity"; as such, the book dealt with capital crimes and the associated procedure. The 710-page work followed the pattern of Coke's Institutes of the Lawes of England, but was far more methodical; James Fitzjames Stephen said that Hale's work "was not only of the highest authority but shows a depth of thought which puts it in quite a different category from Coke's Institute... [it] is far more of a treatise and far less of an index or mere work of practice". The book dealt with the criminal capacity of infants, insanity and idiocy, the defence of drunkenness, capital offences, treason, homicide and theft. Hale endorses the application of capital punishments to children in Historia, writing that "it is clear that an infant above fourteen years is equally subject to capital punishments as others of full age; for it is presumptio juris, that after fourteen years they are doli capaces, and can discern between good and evil".

In the 19th century, Andrew Amos wrote a critique of the Historia titled Ruins of Time exemplified in Sir Matthew Hale's History of the Pleas of the Crown, which both criticised and praised Hale's work while directing the main criticism at the judges and lawyers who cited the Historia without considering that it was dated.

Hale also reorganised the first of Coke's Institutes, which dealt with Thomas de Littleton's Treatise on Tenures; Hale's edition was the most commonly used, and the first to extract Coke's broader philosophical points. His written works, however, were fragmentary, and did not individually lay out his jurisprudence. Harold J. Berman, writing in the Yale Law Journal, notes that it is only "possible by a study of the entire corpus of Hale's writings to reconstruct the coherent legal philosophy that underlies them".

Hale's writings on witchcraft and marital rape were extremely influential. In 1662, he was involved in "one of the most notorious of the seventeenth century English witchcraft trials", where he sentenced two women (Amy Duny and Rose Cullender) to death for witchcraft. The judgment of Hale in this case was extremely influential in future cases, and was used in the Salem witch trials to justify the forfeiture of the accused's lands. As late as 1664, Hale used the argument that the existence of laws against witches is proof that witches exist.

Regarding marital rape, Hale believed that a marriage was a contract which merged the legal entities of husband and wife into one body. He consequently argued that "the husband cannot be guilty of a rape committed by himself upon his lawful wife, for by their mutual consent and contract the wife hath given up herself in this kind unto her husband, which she cannot retract".

This pronouncement became a foundational principle of the law on marital rape and was invoked uncontroversially in 1822, though by 1888 there was judicial dispute over its validity. From 1949 onwards courts paid only "lip service" to it, prefiguring a series of cases in the late 1980s and 1990s that overturned the precedent.

The most famous of these cases is that of R v R, in which the House of Lords established that there was no marital immunity to rape. Their judgment was unequivocal: they cited the emergent body of case law contradicting Hale, held that Hale's construction of marriage was no more than "fiction", and found that the principle did not "even remotely" represent contemporary views. The court suggested that the common law, in this respect, was out of touch with common opinion.

Hale's views on marital rape emerged from his fundamentally contractual view of marriage. This led him to simultaneously eliminate the existing rape defence for a man cohabiting with a woman, on the ground that cohabitation does not involve any contract.

According to a 1978 article by G. Geis in the British Journal of Law and Society, Hale's opinions on witchcraft are closely tied to his writings on marital rape, which are found in the Historia. Geis argues that both arose from misogynistic bias.

Although Hale wrote voluminously, he published little in his lifetime: his writings were discovered and published by others after his death. There are still dozens of volumes of his manuscripts that remain unpublished, including numerous theological treatises. The majority of these manuscripts are found in the Fairhurst Papers at Lambeth Palace Library. His largest work in manuscript, "De Deo" (ca. 1662–1667), consists of ten books filling five volumes and is estimated to contain nearly a million words. There are also three copies of a treatise on natural law at the British Library. A critical edition of this treatise on natural law has been published as Of the Law of Nature (2015), which contains chapters on law in general and the law of nature. In the same work, Hale criticizes the reduction of natural law to self-preservation as "the only Cardinall Law" (the view normally associated with Thomas Hobbes), cites John Selden's De jure naturali et gentium juxta disciplinam Ebraeorum repeatedly, and appears to share conceptual continuities with both Hugo Grotius's De jure belli ac pacis and Francisco Suárez's Tractatus de legibus ac deo legislatore.

=== Jurisprudence ===
During Hale's period as a barrister and judge, the general conclusion in England was that the repository of the law and conventional wisdom was not politics, as in Renaissance Europe, but the common law. This had been brought about thanks to Sir Edward Coke, who in his Institutes and practice as a judge advocated judge-made law. Coke asserted that judge-made law had the answer to any question asked of it, and as a result, "a learned judge... was the natural arbiter of politics". This principle was known as the "appeal to reason", with "reason" referring not to rationality but the method and logic used by judges in upholding and striking down laws. Coke's theory meant that certainty of the law and "intellectual beauty" was the way to see if a law was just and correct, and that the system of law could eventually become sophisticated enough to be predictable. John Selden held similar beliefs, in that he thought that the common law was the proper law of England. However, he argued that this did not necessarily create judicial discretion to play with it, and that proper did not necessarily equal perfect. The law was nothing more than a contract made by the English people; this is known as the "appeal to contract". Thomas Hobbes argued against Coke's theory. Along with Francis Bacon, he argued for natural law, created by the King's authority, not by any individual judge. Hobbes felt that there was no skill unique to lawyers, and that the law could be understood not through Coke's "reason" (the method used by lawyers) but through understanding the King's instructions. While the judges did make law, this was only valid because it was "tacitly confirmed (because not disapproved) by the [King]".

Hale's legal theory was highly influenced by both Coke and Selden. He argued that the making of the law was a contract, but that it was subject to a test of "reasonable" character, something that only the judges could rule on. In this way, he sat in a middle ground between Selden and Coke. This was in conflict with the argument of Hobbes. In 1835, Hale's "Reflections on Hobbes' Dialogue" was discovered; Frederick Pollock posits that since Hobbes' Dialogue was first published in 1681, six years after Hale's death, Hale must have seen an early copy or draft. D.E.C. Yale, writing in the Cambridge Law Journal, suggests that Chief Justice Vaughan had access to the Dialogue, and may have passed a copy on to Hale before his death. In his Reflections, Hale agreed with Coke that the judge's task was to bring the reason of the common law (the coherence of the legal system) in line with the reason of the law in question (to justify that law). He disagreed with Hobbes that a layman could understand the law, saying that "he that hath been educated in the study of the law hath a great advantage over those that have been otherwise exercised". The distinction between Coke and Hale is that Hale agreed with Selden that law was created through agreement, and disagreed that reason had an inherent binding power. Hale agreed with Hobbes that the interpretation of the law could not be left to individual reason, and that the law is not an exact science; the best that can be produced is a set of laws which give a reasonable outcome in the majority of cases.

=== Natural philosophy ===
Hale published several works of "natural philosophy" (what would today be known as physics). These include An essay touching gravitation (1673), which dealt with the phenomena of weight and buoyancy within an Aristotelian framework, and Difficiles nugæ (1675), which was concerned with the interpretation of Torricelli's experiment. Hale's Observations touching the principles of natural motions was published posthumously in 1677. The Victorian mathematician Augustus De Morgan referred to this last as "a very philosophical book, about flux and materia prima, virtus activa and essentialis, and other fundamentals." Hale's approach to natural philosophy was rendered obsolete by the subsequent triumph of Isaac Newton's mathematical and experimental methods.

=== List of works ===
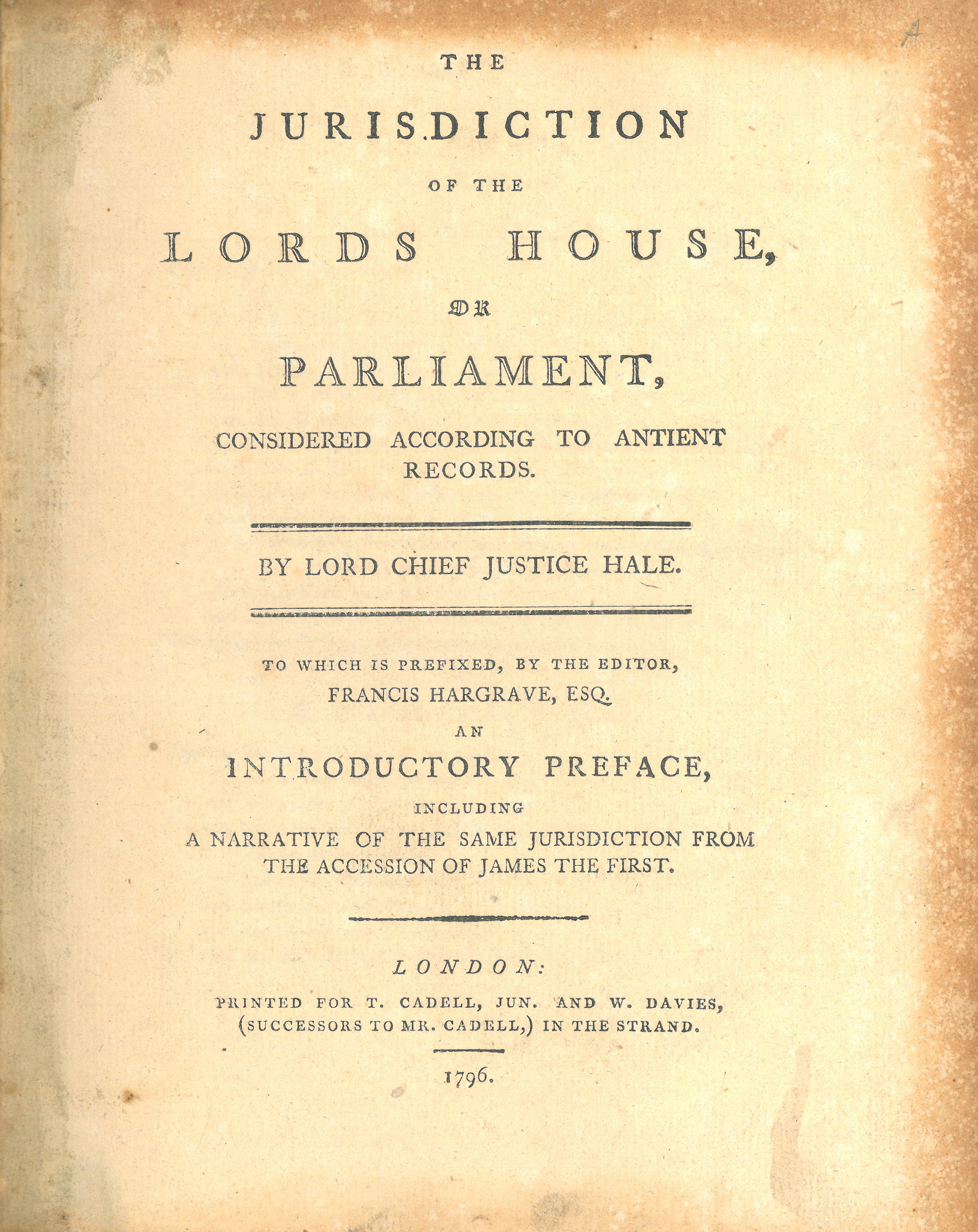
The title page of Hale's The Jurisdiction of the Lords House, or Parliament (1796)

Hale's full works include:

- Contemplations, Moral and Divine (1676).
- The Primitive Origination of Mankind, Considered and Examined According to the Light of Nature (1677).
- The Life and Death of Pomponius Atticus written by his contemporary and acquaintance Cornelius Nepos. Translated out of his fragments, together with observations political and moral thereon (1677).
- Pleas of the Crown. A Methodical Summary (1678).
- A Discourse of the Knowledge of God and of Ourselves (1688).
- On Pomponious Atticus (1689).
- Origin of Mankind by Natural Propagation.
- The Original Institution, Power and Jurisdiction of Parliament (1707).
- The History of the Common Law of England (1713).
- Government in General, its Origin, Alteration and Trials.
- The History of the Pleas of the Crown (1736).
- The Analysis of the Law. Being a Scheme, or Abstract, of the several Titles and Partitions of the Law of England, Digested into Method (1739).
- Considerations Touching the Amendment or Alterations of Laws (1787).
- The Jurisdiction of the Lord's House, or, Parliament Considered According to Ancient Records (1796).
- Reflections on Hobbes' Dialogue of the Law (1835).
- The Prerogatives of the King (Selden Society, 1976)
- A Disquisition Touching the Jurisdiction of the... Courts of Admiralty (Selden Society, 1993)
- Of the Law of Nature (2015).

He also wrote the preface to Rolle's Abridgment.

== Bibliography ==
- Barton, J. L. (1992). "The story of marital rape". Law Quarterly Review. 108 (April). Sweet & Maxwell: 260–271.
- Berman, Harold J. (1994). "The Origins of Historical Jurisprudence: Coke, Selden, Hale". Yale Law Journal. 103 (7). The Yale Law Journal Company: 1651–1738. doi:10.2307/797013. ISSN 0044-0094. JSTOR 797013.
- Brown, David C. (1993). "The Forfeitures at Salem, 1692". William and Mary Quarterly. 50 (1). Omohundro Institute of Early American History and Culture: 85–111. doi:10.2307/2947237. ISSN 0043-5597. JSTOR 2947237.
- Burnet, Gilbert (1820). The Lives of Sir Matthew Hale and John Earl of Rochester. W. Pickering. OCLC 559639247.
- Campbell, John (2005). The Lives of the Chief Justices of England. Vol. 1. Elibron. ISBN 1-4212-5221-X.
- Corbett, J. H. (1942). "Sir Matthew Hale". Alberta Law Quarterly. 4 (6). University of Alberta Faculty of Law: 165–166.
- Cromartie, Alan (1995). Sir Matthew Hale 1609–1676: Law, religion and natural philosophy. Cambridge University Press. ISBN 0-521-53446-1.
- Foss, Edward (1865). Tabulae curiales. John Murray. OCLC 297378916.
- Foss, Edward (2000) [1870]. Biographia Juridica: A Biographical Dictionary of the Judges of England from the Conquest to the Present Time, 1066–1870. The Lawbook Exchange. ISBN 1-886363-86-2.
- Flanders, Henry (1908). "Sir Matthew Hale". University of Pennsylvania Law Review. 56 (6). University of Pennsylvania Law School: 384–394. ISSN 0041-9907.
- Fritze, Ronald H.; Robison, William B. (1996). Historical Dictionary of Stuart England, 1603–1689. Greenwood Publishing Group. ISBN 0-313-28391-5.
- Geis, G. (1978). "Lord Hale, Witches, and Rape". British Journal of Law and Society. 5 (1). Wiley-Blackwell: 26–44. doi:10.2307/1409846. ISSN 0306-3704. JSTOR 1409846.
- Hasday, Jill Elaine (2000). "Contest and Consent: A Legal History of Marital Rape". California Law Review. 88 (5). UC Berkeley School of Law: 1373–1505. doi:10.2307/3481263. ISSN 0008-1221. JSTOR 3481263.
- Heward, Edmund (1972). Matthew Hale. London: Robert Hale. ISBN 978-0-7091-3552-4 – via Internet Archive.
- Holdsworth, William (1923). "Sir Matthew Hale". Law Quarterly Review. 39 (4). Sweet & Maxwell: 402–426. ISSN 0023-933X.
- Hostettler, John (2002). The Red Gown: The Life and Works of Sir Matthew Hale. Chichester: Barry Rose Law Publishers. ISBN 1-902681-28-2.
- Pollock, Frederick (1921). "Sir Matthew Hale on Hobbes: An Unpublished Ms". Law Quarterly Review. 37 (3). Sweet & Maxwell: 274–303. ISSN 0023-933X.
- Ryan, Rebecca M. (1995). "The Sex Right: A Legal History of the Marital Rape Exemption". Law & Social Inquiry. 20 (4). Blackwell Publishing: 941–1001. doi:10.1111/j.1747-4469.1995.tb00697.x. ISSN 0897-6546. S2CID 144216952.
- Sainty, John (1993). The Judges of England 1272–1990: a list of judges of the superior courts. Oxford: Selden Society. OCLC 29670782.
- Yale, D. E. C. (1972). "Hobbes and Hale on Law, Legislation and the Sovereign". Cambridge Law Journal. 31 (1). Cambridge University Press: 121–156. doi:10.1017/S0008197300133999. ISSN 0008-1973. S2CID 145107819.

Legal offices
| Preceded by Sir Orlando Bridgeman | Lord Chief Baron of the Exchequer; 1660–1671 | Succeeded by Sir Edward Turnour |
| Preceded by John Kelynge | Lord Chief Justice; 1671–1676 | Succeeded by Richard Raynsford |
Parliament of England
| Preceded by John Crofts; William Neast; Robert Holmes | Member of Parliament for Gloucestershire with George Berkeley; John Howe; Christopher Guise; Sylvanus Wood; 1654–1656 | Succeeded by George Berkeley; John Howe; John Crofts; Baynham Throckmorton; William Neast |
| Preceded by Nathaniel Fiennes | Member of Parliament for Oxford University with John Mylles; 1659 | Succeeded by Not represented in restored Rump |
