= William Tracy (disambiguation) =

William Tracy was an American actor.

William Tracy may also refer to:

- William Tracy (JP) (died 1530), English justice of the peace and early Lutheran convert
- William de Tracy (died c. 1189), knight and the feudal baron of Bradninch, Devon
- William Tracy (MP, died 1440), MP for Gloucestershire
- William Tracy (14th-century MP), MP for Gloucestershire

== See also ==
- William Tracey, English footballer
