= Nicholas Walshe =

16th-century English politician

Nicholas Walshe (died 1568) of Little Sodbury and Olveston, Gloucestershire was an English politician.

== Family ==
He was a younger son of Maurice Walshe of Little Sodbury. In 1556 he survived a fireball that struck the house and killed his father and elder siblings. He married Mary, daughter of Sir John Berkeley of Stoke Gifford. He died in his thirties in 1568, leaving his three-year-old son Henry as heir. His wife subsequently married Sir William Herbert of Swansea, while his son died in a duel.

== Career ==
He was a justice of the peace by 1559, served as sheriff of Gloucestershire in 1561/2 and was chosen as member of the parliament of England for Gloucestershire in 1563.

Parliament of England
Preceded by Henry Jerningham; Walter Denys	Member of Parliament for Gloucestershire; 1563; With: Richard Denys	Succeeded by Giles Poole; Nicholas Poyntz
