= John Browning (died 1416) =

Member of the Parliament of England

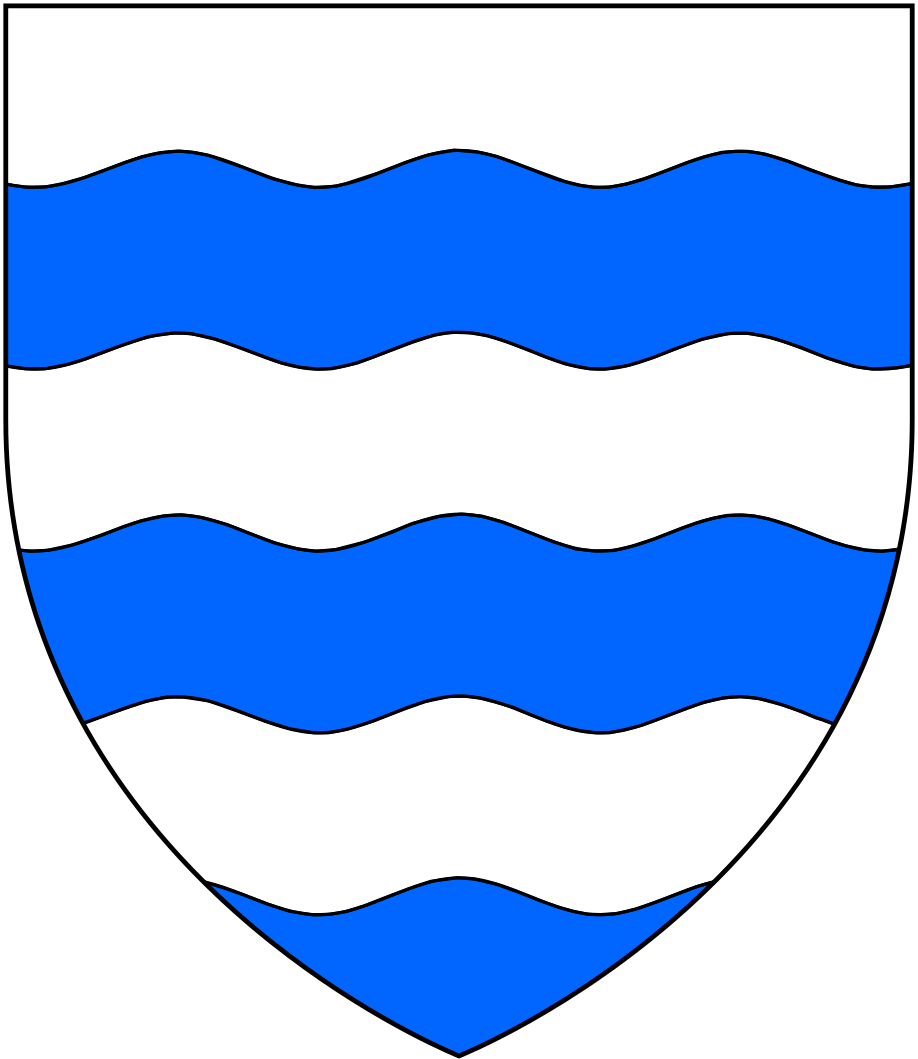
Arms of Browning of Melbury Sampford: Barry wavy of six argent and azure

John Browning (c. 1369–1416) (alias Brounyng, etc.) of Melbury Sampford in Dorset and of Leigh near Deerhurst, Gloucestershire, was thrice a member of Parliament for Gloucestershire, in 1397, 1401 and 1414.

== Origins ==
He was born in about 1369, the eldest son and heir of John Browning by his wife Alice Mautravers, a daughter and co-heiress of Sir John Mautravers, MP, of Hooke in Dorset (and a half-sister of John Maltravers, 1st Baron Maltravers (c.1290–1364)), by his second wife Joan Foliot, daughter and heiress of Sir Walter Foliot of Nantwich, Cheshire, and of Melbury Sampford in Dorset.

== Marriage and children ==
He married twice:

- Firstly at some time before February 1383, to Agnes Rodborough (c.1364-pre.1392), a daughter and co-heiress of William Rodborough of Leigh, near Deerhurst, Gloucestershire, by whom he had issue one son, who predeceased him, and one daughter:
  - Richard Browning (1387-1400), died an infant;
  - Cecily Browning, wife of Guy Whittington, MP, eldest son of Robert Whittington of Pauntley, and nephew of Richard Whittington, Mayor of London. She inherited several of her maternal Rodborough estates.
- Secondly, at some time before 1397, he married Eleanor FitzNichol, the younger daughter and a co-heiress of Sir Thomas FitzNichol, MP, of Hill near Berkeley Castle, in Gloucestershire, by whom he had two sons including:
  - John Browning (1397-1420), eldest son and heir, who besides his paternal inheritance also inherited various FitzNichol estates from his maternal grandfather. He died childless aged 23 when his heir became his younger brother William Browning.
  - William Browning (born 1400), thrice an MP for Dorset in 1439, 1450 and 1455.
- Thirdly, in 1408, he married Alice Berkeley (c.1379-1414), a daughter and co-heiress of Thomas Berkeley, MP, of Coberley, and widow of Thomas Bridges of Haresfield, Gloucestershire.

== Sources ==
- Woodger, L. S., biography of "Browning, John (c.1369-1416), of Melbury Sampford, Dorset and Leigh near Deerhurst, Glos.", published in: History of Parliament: House of Commons 1386-1421, ed. J.S. Roskell, L. Clark, C. Rawcliffe., 1993
