= Manor of Siston =

Manor in England

Manor of Siston is the ancient manor in Siston in South Gloucestershire, England.

== Descent of the manor ==
=== Berkeley of Dursley ===
The Domesday Book of 1086 records Siston at an annual value of 8 marks, assessed at 5 hides, amongst the lands of the Norman magnate Roger de Berkeley I (d. 1093), held in-chief from the King. Roger's possessions and influence, centered on the royal demesne of Berkeley Castle, Dursley, ranged from Gloucester in the north to Bristol in the south, the Cotswolds to the east and the Bristol Channel to the west.

Dr Neil Stacy has reconstructed the early history of Siston as follows:

- In 1127 Siston was occupied by a certain "Matron" Racendis, possibly the widow of Roger II (d. 1127) de Berkeley.
- She attempted to bequeath it to Glastonbury Abbey, which held neighbouring Pucklechurch, seemingly to deprive her nephew William of control of it, who was administering her son's inheritance during her lifetime. She stated that she held the manor freely with no other claim upon it. The Abbot sent knights and monks to Siston to visit Racendis on her death bed to remind her of her promise, only to find monks already in attendance from another Abbey, also claiming her body and property. Following a public hearing and the payment of 40 marks (Note: 40 Marks: based on the Domesday Book value of Siston this was a considerable sum, representing five years' profits of the manor.) by Henry of Blois, Abbot of Glastonbury, to Racendis, probably to go to the other claimant house as compensation, the manor subsequently was recognised as being held from Glastonbury, still however tenanted by the Berkeleys.
- This position was perhaps formalised by a charter (now lost) from King Henry I (1100–1135), uncle to Abbot Henry.
- A further charter of confirmation was granted by King Stephen (1135–1154) in January 1138 describing Siston as rightfully held by Glastonbury, as its ancient possession. Stephen was the brother of Abbot Henry, both being sons of the Count of Blois, by Adela, fourth daughter of William I. The proof offered of an ancient holding may have been a charter forged in the scriptorium of Glastonbury, as Dr. Stacy suggests.
- However, in 1153 Roger III de Berkeley, possibly the son of Racendis, claiming it his property by inheritance, attempted to dispose of Siston in marriage settlement on a daughter of Robert FitzHarding, betrothed to his son and heir. Robert FitzHarding was a wealthy merchant of Bristol and a financier of Duke Henry of Aquitaine (future King Henry II, 1154–1189, rival of Stephen). This double marriage contract, binding the son and heir of each man to marry a daughter of the other, was signed at the house of Robert FitzHarding in Bristol in the presence of Duke Henry and 16 witnesses. It was an attempt to restore good relations between Roger de Berkeley and Robert FitzHarding. FitzHarding, earlier in 1153, had been given Berkeley Castle by Duke Henry and became 1st. Baron Berkeley, leaving Roger de Berkeley with a truncated lordship centred on Dursley.
- Glastonbury appealed to Duke Henry, who abruptly ordered the Earl of Gloucester to restore Siston to Glastonbury. The Earl of Gloucester effected a compromise whereby The Dursley Berkeleys would continue to hold Siston, but paying knight's service for it to the Abbey as overlords. Professor Crouch, writing in 2000, stated: "in the past 10 years the manor of Siston has become a very significant place in the understanding of what was happening in King Stephen's reign, largely due to the documentation that the contest for its possession generated"
- In 1218 Siston was handed over by Glastonbury with other temporalities to the Bishop of Bath & Wells, and continued to be held in chief by that see until dissolution. The knight's service seems to have lapsed by the middle of the 13th century.

=== Walerand of Whaddon, Wiltshire ===
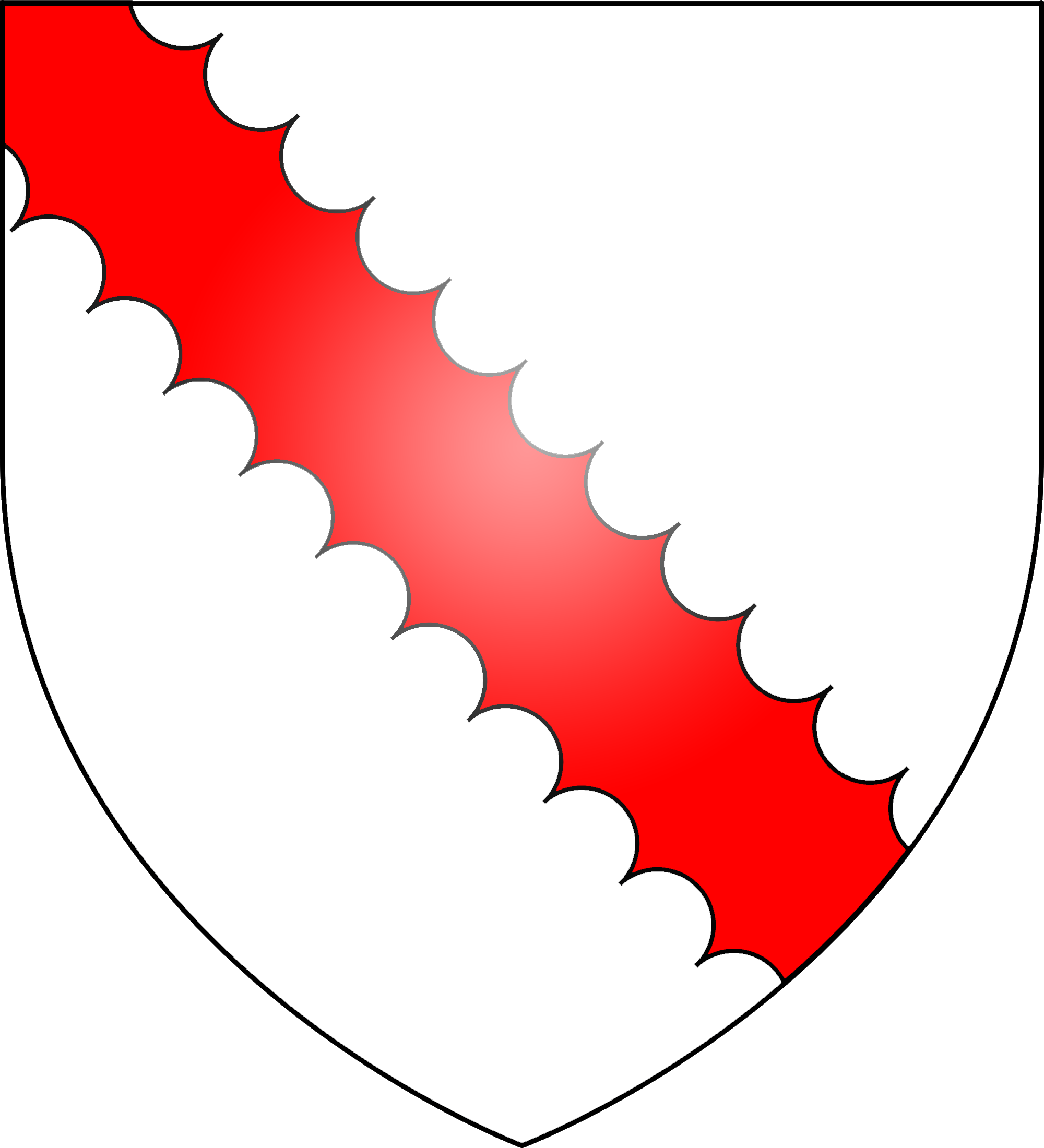
Armourials of Robert Walerand: "Argent, a bend engrailled gules"

Siston eventually passed by marriage to Robert Walerand (d. 1272), Justiciar to Henry III, one of the four chief ministers of the Crown, eldest son of William Walerand of Whaddon, Wiltshire, and Isabel, daughter of Roger de Berkeley of Dursley, by her second marriage. By 1242/3 Walerand had succeeded to his patrimony of Whaddon, part of the Domesday barony of Walerand the Huntsman, whose descendants had often held the New Forest and Forest of Clarendon in fee. In 1245, on the death of the last Marshal Earl of Pembroke, he was made custodian of his lands in west Wales, including Pembroke Castle. From 1246 to 1250 he was High Sheriff of Gloucestershire and keeper of Gloucester Castle. In 1253 he held the stewardship of the New Forest and in 1255 was made keeper of the Forest of Dean and Constable of St Briavel's Castle. In 1259 he became keeper of Bristol Castle. Walerand gained huge land holdings throughout the kingdom largely acquired as forfeited lands of Hugh de Nevill after Evesham in 1265 and is recorded as holding on his death, among many other manors:

Siston, the manor with the advowson of the church including pasture in Kingeswod held of Sir Henry de Berkele, Lord of Dersleye, by service of 1 knight's fee.

Clearly the escheator of Gloucestershire was in error about Siston still being held from the Berkeleys, a mistake his successors were to make on at least two further occasions, when it was stated to be held in chief from the King, royal orders then being procured to halt the "intermeddling". Walerand, who seemingly had such a vast choice of residences, was apparently in residence at Siston, before and after all these grants were made. In 1256 he was given by eight breeding bream fish by the King to establish a vivarium or larder pond at Siston. This is an amusing detail, surely trinkets given arising from some promise in an after dinner discussion between the King and Walerand, then his steward, about the latest trends in fish breeding. ("I'll send you some and you can see for yourself!" is perhaps how the conversation ended). At the time these fish were received at Siston Walerand was employed on important business, raising money for Henry's second son, Edmund to take up the crown of Sicily, offered by the Pope in 1254. His forceful exactions were one of the causes of the rebellion of Simon de Montfort and the Barons' War, ended at the Battle of Evesham in 1265. In 1265, possibly as a personal reward for his assistance at Evesham, the King gave an order to his Forester in Melkesham, Wilts (15 m. to SW.) to let Walerand have 5 live buck and 5 live doe fallow deer for the establishment of his park at Siston. This was possibly the nucleus of the 1,000 strong herd there in 1607 referred to in the Cecil Papers.

The park had been augmented with the permission of Walter, Bishop of Bath & Wells from former Abbey lands at Pucklechurch, at the yearly rent of 1d. Walerand married in 1257 Maud Russell daughter of Sir Ralph Russell of Kingston Russell, Dorset, who had inherited the Newmarch estates, including Dyrham (3 m. E. of Siston), from his wife Isabel, whose wardship and marriage his father Sir John Russell (d. c. 1224) had purchased on the death without male heir of her father James, Baron Newmarch. (Note: The Newmarch family of North Cadbury was not related to the Norman marcher lord Bernard Newmarch, who left only a daughter.) This marriage, to the daughter of his neighbour at Dyrham, is surely further evidence as to Walerand's actual residence at Siston. Maud brought Dyrham to Walerand as her Marriage Settlement, thus unifying the two manors briefly (in anticipation of the Denys's), but as Walerand died sine prole Dyrham reverted to the Russells (Note: The Russells recovered Dyrham not without much difficulty. The Inq. p. m. of Walerand cites complaints made by the Russells to the Escheator, who had seized Dyrham, that it had been granted to W. with reversion to themselves in the absence of an heir.) and Siston passed to his heir, nephew Sir Alan Plokenet.

=== Plokenet of Herefordshire ===
Sir Alan Plokenet (d. 1298), was the son of Walerand's sister Alice (Walerand's intended heir, nephew Robert Walerand, (born 1256) (son of his elder brother William and Isabel de Kilpeck) was deemed an "idiot" legally incapable of inheritance). The Plokenet family was from Plouquenet, Brittany. Sir Alan's main lands were in Herefordshire, and he was buried at Dore Abbey, 10 miles (16 km) south west of Hereford, which he had endowed.

Alan's son Alan II inherited Siston as evidenced by the lawsuit of novel disseisin brought against him in 1320 by Sir Nicholas de Kingston his retainer, who claimed he had been unjustly deprived of his "free tenement of Siston" Clearly Plokenet himself was not in residence at Siston, unlike Walerand. Alan II d.s.p. 1325 and the property seems to have passed to Alan I's sister Joan (d. 1327) who had married Sir Henry (Edward?) de Bohun. The union was sine prole. Eleanor de Bohun, daughter of the Earl of Hereford and wife of James Butler, 1st Earl of Ormond (created 1328) certainly inherited the manor of Kilpeck, Hereford, from an Alan Plokenet, apparently at the request of Queen Isabella, so may have received Siston also.

=== Corbet of Caus, Shropshire ===
Arms of Corbet of Caus Castle, Shropshire: Or, a raven sable

Arms of Corbet of Siston & Hope: Argent, a raven proper within a bordure sable bezantée

How Siston manor came to the Corbets is not clear, but Sir Peter Corbet, grandfather of Margaret, was seized of it when he died in 1362. It is however known that their Tenancies-in-Chief of Alveston (9 miles (14 km) north west of Siston) and Earthcott, Gloucestershire which holdings were to determine the devolution of Siston, had arisen on the marriage of Sir Peter Corbet (d. 1362) to Elizabeth FitzWarin, daughter of Walter FitzWarin (d. 1363) of Alveston. The marriage is likely to have arisen due to the two families anciently being neighbouring Marcher Lords in Shropshire and the Marches. Siston seems to have been the residence of Peter Corbet in Gloucestershire as Alveston and Earthcott were occupied by the de Gloucester family, holding from FitzWarin, when granted to Peter Corbet. Unlike Alveston and Earthcott, Siston was not held in-chief from the king, but from the Abbey of Bath and Wells. (Note: The royal escheator became confused on the death of Peter Corbet in 1362, and had taken into his possession not only Alveston and Earthcott quite correctly, but also Siston held under Bath and Wells. The King was prevailed upon to issue an order to his Escheator concerning Siston: "not to intermeddle further with the manor of Siston taken into the King's hand by the death of Peter Corbet, delivering up any issues..." Close Rolls Ed III, March 1362. Exactly the same confusion arose on the death of William Wyriott 17 years later.)

The Corbets descended from Norman Marcher Lords of Caus Castle, Shropshire, which name was taken from Pays de Caux, Normandy. Their "Liberty" in the Marches is estimated to have covered between 50 square miles (130 km^{2}) and 150 square miles (390 km^{2}), and was exempt from royal writs, the Corbets assuming for themselves the rights of High Justice, imprisoning and executing men with impunity. The Corbet branch at Siston, whilst it had lost most of the ancient lands to collateral Corbet branches, nevertheless was the senior line of the Barons of Caus

When Peter Corbet died, he left ten-year-old fatherless triplet grandchildren, as his descendants: John, deemed the eldest, William and Margaret. Their father William, who had married Elizabeth Oddingseles, had predeceased his own father, having had a short life. It is not known to whom the wardship of John the heir was granted, but the second son William was granted to John Gamage "by the King's Order". The Gamages were a Norman family descended from Godfrey de Gamage who married Joan de Clare, one of the co-heiresses of "Strongbow", 1st. Earl of Pembroke (d. 1176) and were based at Rogiet, directly across the Severn Estuary from Bristol.

John died aged probably just under 21 in 1374. The lack of records suggests he had not attained his majority. His younger brother William, soon out of wardship at 21, thereupon inherited the Corbet estates. His sister Margaret, pivotal to the future descent of Siston, was married to William Wyriott from Orielton in Pembrokeshire, which was 6 miles (9.7 km) south west of the Corbet manor of Lawrenny. It appears that she had been granted the manor, possibly by her brother out of his new inheritance, as her marriage settlement. Margaret and Wyriott probably set up home in Pembroke, intending to spend the rest of their lives there. However, just three years after the death of John, William Corbet died too, without progeny, age 24, and Margaret was sole heiress of the Corbet estates, with her husband Wyriott holding in her right. These estates comprised Alveston and Earthcott (Green), both in Gloucestershire, both held in-Chief, Siston, Lawrenny, and Hope-juxta-Caus in Shropshire.

The future devolution of Siston depends entirely on the possession by Margaret of the two tenancies-in-chief of Alveston and Earthcott. These were held directly from the Crown, unlike all the others, held from mesne lords. A tenancy-in-chief without a male tenant was likely to escheat, that is revert to the Crown. The king relied on his tenants-in-chief to be his agents in the shires, to raise troops for him and to perform knight service. He could not afford to leave ladies, educated to the gentler things in life, in such positions as the manor would simply not fulfil its feudal role. Only two years after she had inherited the Corbet estates from her brother, William Wyriott her husband also died, without issue, in 1379. Margaret now found herself as just such a widow tenant-in-chief.

Effectively Margaret now became a pawn of the king. As a female tenant-in-chief she could not marry unless by royal licence; naturally the king wanted to select his own tenants based on his own pragmatic criteria – were they loyal and effective soldiers and good local diplomats for the Crown? Any choice of husband she might make would be refused, because probably the king had a long waiting list of useful men for whom he wished to find vacant royal manors, the revenues from which they would be expected to use in Crown service. Here was the essence of mediaeval feudalism. Margaret had the simple choice: either relinquish the family estates, possibly retiring to a nunnery, or to a life of social obscurity married to a man likely to be beneath her station, for she would have no land to bring to a marriage, or accept the man selected by the king as his new tenant-in-chief for her husband, and remain. Any new husband would on such marriage automatically become the life tenant (in her right) of all her lands and the revenues therefrom, including Siston, not just the royal manors of Alveston and Earthcott. Thus the future devolution of Siston became tied to that of Alveston, which was disposable at the king's choosing.

Edward III had died three years before in 1377, leaving his ten-year-old grandson Richard II, son of The Black Prince who had predeceased his father, as nominal king. In that year of 1380 King Richard II, just three years into his reign, was age 13, clearly too young to appoint his own tenants-in-chief. The question arises as to who was then wielding this significant power of patronage on the king's behalf. Although the kingdom during Richard's minority was in the hands of a series of "continual councils" it seems not implausible that John of Gaunt (1340–1399), Richard's uncle then age 37, Duke of Lancaster and son of Edward III, would have had some influence in the matter, although never having been a formal member of these councils. It was not until Richard was 15 two years later in 1382 that he wrested back his kingdom from his councillors. That he had been proposed by Gaunt would be speculation, but certainly some powerful hand rather than the mere force of romance caused Margaret Corbet to accept the young esquire from Glamorgan, Gilbert Denys as her new husband.

Margaret and Denys were married in 1380, and the long connection of the Denys family with Siston and Gloucestershire as a whole had begun, for as Sir Robert Atkyns, the 18th-century historian of Gloucestershire, stated about the Denys family "There have been more High Sheriffs from them than from any other family in the county". (Note: There are however possibly three other explanations as to how Denys came to Siston. One concerns the Gamage connection discussed above, as Gamage was the warder of at least one Corbet infant and seems to have had kinship with the Turbervilles of Coity, within whose sphere Denys lived. Perhaps a Gamage was instrumental in arranging the marriage. Yet 14th century chivalric society was an interwoven affair, and such overlap of spheres may just be as expected without further significance. The second possible explanation is that before his death in 1379, William Wyriot, as patron of Siston church in right of his wife, had appointed a new priest from the Diocese of Worcester named Roger Dean or Denys (Calendar of Register of Bishop Henry Wakefield of Worcester. 1379, entry 77, f.12r.) It may have been at the recommendation of the young widow's new priest that she married secondly his probable kinsman Gilbert. Yet both of these possible explanations are weakened by the fact that no record is known of a Marriage Licence from the Crown which Margaret would have required. The third possible explanation may be that Denys was promoted to Alveston et al. by the Earl of Stafford, who was a member of the regency councils, unlike Gaunt, and into whose service Denys entered, although not apparently until after Gaunt's death in 1399.)

=== Denys of Waterton, Glamorgan ===
Denys's career had begun in the service of John of Gaunt. It was on the Duke's behalf that in May 1375 he had taken formal custody of the manors of Aberavon and Sully in Glamorgan, part of the holdings of the late Lord Despenser. In 1359 Gaunt had married Blanche of Lancaster, heiress of great estates including Ogmore Castle in Glamorgan, 3 miles (4.8 km) southwest of Waterton, Denys's home. One must assume that Denys had come into the service of Gaunt in connection with duties at Ogmore Castle, possibly stewardship. Denys was to make his mark as a soldier rather than an administrator, and his military service started in March 1378 when he took out royal letters of protection to go overseas as a member of Gaunt's expedition. He is recorded again in 1383 similarly engaged. In 1395 when in Parliament as a knight of the shire for Gloucestershire, Denys was one of the 40 MP's who are believed to have supported the "Twelve Conclusions" proposed by the Lollards, the religious reforming group. John of Gaunt had at one time been a Lollard supporter although by 1395 his enthusiasm had waned, the movement having been recognised as one associated with popular unrest. Denys was from a well-established Glamorgan family, likely already bearing coat-armour, but seems not to have had a manor of his own. The Inquisition post mortem of Sir Lawrence de Berkerolles of 1415 refers to Denys merely paying rent in Waterton, Glamorgan, "together with others". John Denys is stated in the Golden Grove Book of Welsh Pedigrees to have been his father, and this must surely be the John Denys of "Watirton" granted a lease at Bonvilston by Margam Abbey in 1376, yet as John was apparently the youngest of five brothers, unlikely to inherit paternal lands, Waterton was probably a fairly modest home, acquired through John's own exertions. Although the Corbet marriage produced no male issue (Sir Gilbert Denys married secondly (c. 1404) Margaret Russell, eventual co-heiress of Sir Morys Russell (d. 1416) of Dyrham) all the Corbet manors, including Siston, Lawrenny in Pembroke and Hope-juxta-Caus, Salop., nevertheless passed to the Denys's likely due to a settlement by Margaret Corbet similar to that referred to in an Inquisition Quod Damnum of 1382:

Gilbert Deneys and Margaret his wife to settle their manors of Alveston and Earthcott and the hundred [i.e. Court] of Langley on themselves and the heirs male of their bodies, with remainder to the heirs of the body of Margaret, remainder to the right heirs of Gilbert

Siston is not mentioned, but the manor devolved similarly, not reverting to distant Corbet relatives. The marriage, assumed above to have been an arranged one, was a personal success for the couple as Sir Gilbert requested in his will to be buried next to his apparently beloved first Corbet wife in Siston church, although his much younger second Russell wife, mother of his children, survived him by 38 years. Following the death of Sir Gilbert, a dowry life interest in Siston passed to his young Russell widow and thence to her even younger second husband, John Kemeys of Began. Margaret Russell in her turn had apparently had a replacement husband thrust upon her by higher powers, possibly in the form of Gaunt's son Henry Beaufort, Bishop of Winchester, shortly to be member of the regency government of Henry VI, and his soon-to-be son-in-law Sir Edward Stradling. Curiously Denys had had the honour to nominate Beaufort overseer of his will.

=== Kemeys of Began, Monmouth ===
At the time of Denys's death in 1422 it seems that Bishop Beaufort had been planning to marry off his illegitimate daughter Joan, the result of a youthful affair with Alice FitzAlan, daughter of the Earl of Arundel. The man he seemed to have chosen for her was 33-year-old Sir Edward Stradling of St. Donat's, Glamorgan, (6 miles (9.7 km) S.E. of Ogmore) who was well known to Denys.

Stradling was awarded the lucrative wardship of Morys Denys, Gilbert's 12-year-old son and heir and at the very same time Stradling obtained the marriage of Gilbert's widow Margaret Russell for his much younger nephew John Kemeys. It seems clear that the powerful moving hand behind the grants of Morys's wardship and Margaret's marriage was Bishop Beaufort. In 1422, the year of Denys's death, Henry V had died to be succeeded by his 10-year-old son Henry VI, great-nephew of Beaufort. Beaufort was immediately appointed a member of the Regency Government. He was thus in a position to dispose of wardships of infant Tenants-in-Chief like Morys Denys (again due to his holding of Alveston and Earthcott) and of marriages of widows of Tenants-in-Chief, such as Morys's mother. It seems that the wardship of Morys was effectively the marriage settlement offered to Stradling with the hand Joan Beaufort, for they were married the next year in 1423.

John Kemeys (pron: "Kemmis") (d. 1476) thus became on marriage to Margaret Russell, Denys's widow, Lord of Siston for his lifetime, for the manor seems to have been her dowry, traditionally one third of the estate. He was son of John Kemeys of Began (6 m. N.E. of Cardiff Castle, caput of the Lordship of Glamorgan) by Agnes daughter of Sir William Stradling of St. Donats, Glamorgan and nephew to Sir Edward Stradling. Sir Edward married off his ward Morys to his daughter Katherine, who thus became a matriarch of the Denys family. Although they had long shared interests in Coity, Glamorgan, the Stradling connection with the Denys's across the Severn in Gloucestershire had begun in 1416 when Sir John Stradling, the elderly first cousin of Sir Edward's father, had married Joan Dauntsey, the young widow and second wife of Sir Morys Russell, father-in-law of Denys, thereby capturing a life interest in her large dowry. This event however, occurring whilst Sir Gilbert was still alive (he outlived his father-in-law by 6 years) may have happened with Deny's blessing, even encouragement. He had been a neighbour, friend and ally of Russell, was by then himself a powerful person, and must have had a concern and some influence over the disposition of Russell's widow. It is unlikely to have been a love match due to the age difference, or was it dictated by the Crown as the fine referred to above shows. Possibly John Stradling was an old Glamorgan friend of Denys, who deemed him a suitable match on personal grounds. Yet the marriage of Denys's widow Margaret Russell to Kemeys could have been engineered by Sir Edward Stradling, especially as Denys in his will had urged his widow Margaret Russell to take a vow of chastity. Within 7 months she had remarried Kemeys. Maybe Stradling was legitimately reaping his reward, by ensuring that the benefit from the Corbet manors procured for Denys by his grandfather-in-law John of Gaunt passed permanently into the family of his own daughter, and temporarily as a life interest to his nephew. Kemeys lived the remainder of his life as Lord of Siston, representing Gloucestershire in Parliament for a term. His son Roger died insane in 1484, but after having played a role in public life. His son founded the Bedminster, Somerset line of Kemeys.

=== Denys of Alveston and Dyrham ===
It was at the death of John Kemeys in 1476 (predeceased by Margaret in 1460 and Morys Denys in 1466) that the Denys family regained possession of Siston. The Denys residence had meantime been at Olveston (next to Alveston) where the remains of their fortified manor house, Olveston Court, possibly built by FitzWarin, can be seen. Apparently they preferred to reside thereafter at Dyrham, the nearby manor inherited from the Russells (together with Kingston Russell in Dorset), which became the definitive seat of Sir William Denys, son and heir of Sir Walter. The Siston pre-Tudor manor house could have been re-enfeoffed (i.e. let on life tenancy) or perhaps lived in by one of Sir William's sons. The Denys family held Siston from the death of Kemeys in 1376 until 1568 as evidenced by the Cecil Papers.

=== Denys, Richard, of Cold Ashton and Gloucester ===
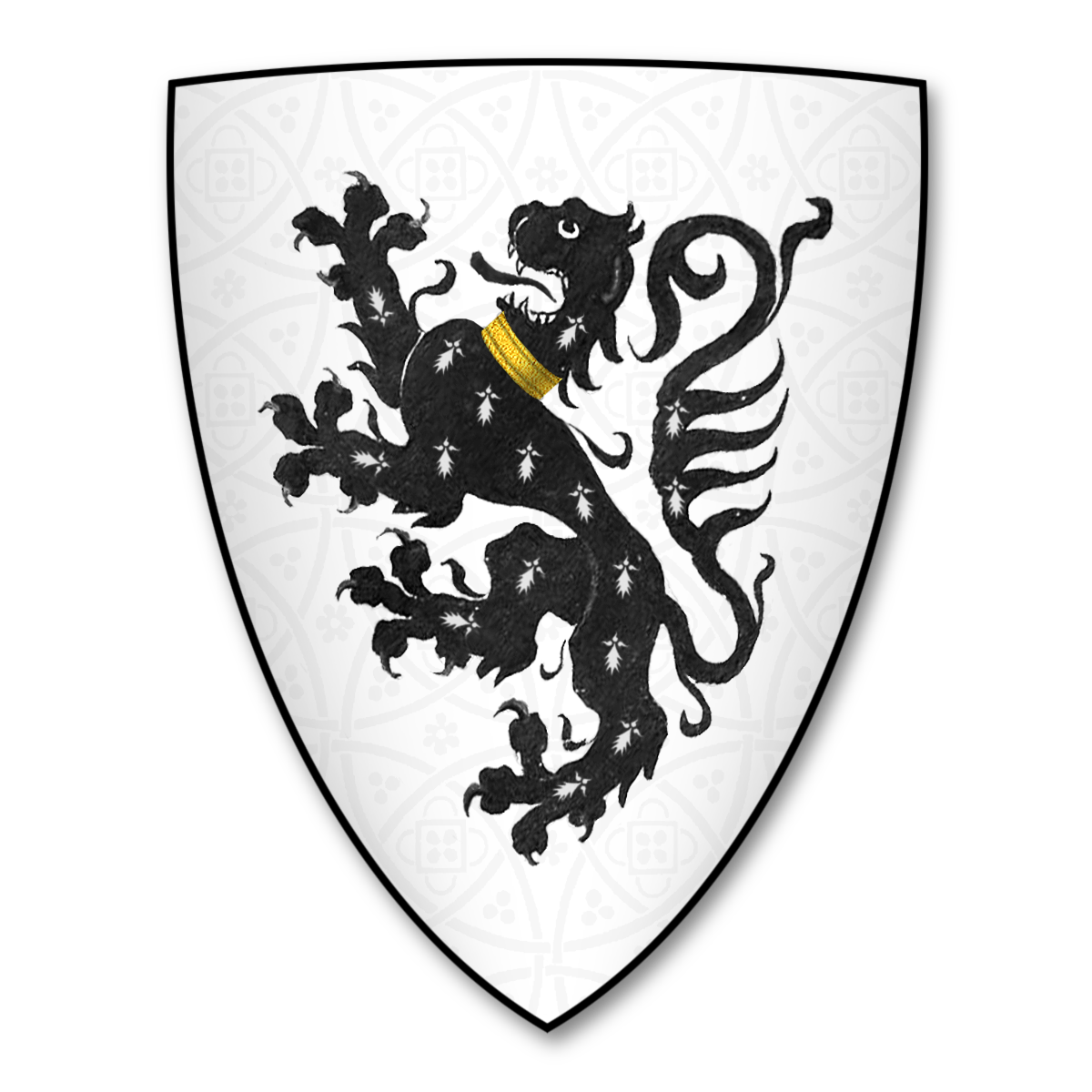
Arms of John Guillim of Minsterworth: "Argent, a lion rampant ermines collared"

Richard Denys, of Gloucester and Cold Ashton, Member of Parliament – Constituency: Bath (1547), Gloucestershire (1563). son of Sir Walter Denys and Margaret Weston daughter of Sir Richard Weston married c.1557, Anne St. John, daughter of Sir John St. John, of Bletsoe, Bedfordshire, England, son of 'Saint John', Sir Oliver St. John, Baron St. John, of Bletso, Knight, 'Lord of Penmark' (created 1582 for Oliver St. John), son of Sir John de St. John and Isabel Paveley daughter and heiress of Sir John Paveley and Lady Margaret Waldegrave out of wife Alice Bradshagh daughter of Thomas Bradshagh.

Richard Denys was the great-grandson of Maurice Berkeley, 3rd Lord Berkeley who was born at Berkeley Castle, in Gloucestershire son of James Berkeley, 1st Baron Berkeley and his third wife Lady Isabel Mowbray daughter of 1st Duke of Norfolk. Maurice was heir to brother William Berkeley, 1st Marquess, of Berkeley, 2nd Baron Berkeley.

Richard and Anne had four sons and six daughters: Several are Ann Denys Porter, Walter Denys, Frances Denys Guillim who is the mother of immigrants from England to the Virginia Colony.

Francis Denys married, John Guillim, Lord of the Manor of Hateweys, antiquarian and officer of arms at the College of Arms in London, the son of John Guillim of Wesbury-on-Severen, Gloucestershire. John Guilim is known for his work on heraldry and they had five boys and six girls. Their son St. John Guillim married daughter of Thomas Henshaw, Margery and their son John III Guilliam possessed 1,000 acres of Prince George County

Through Francis and John Guillim's children, Elizabeth Guillim's birth is recorded in c. 1655, in Virginia, death 21 March 1715, Surry County, Virginia. With her first marriage to an NN West, there were two sons, John West and Francis West. Elizabeth Guillim's second marriage was to William Bevin and there was issue of two sons and a daughter. Elizabeth's third marriage to Francis Mabry begins a tradition involving great landholdings and slave ownership, though the latter is often referred to in documents as negros rather than of slaves.

One son of Francis Mabry named Charles inherited an equal portion of approximately 400 acres divided between him and his brother Hinchea. The property is called Fountain Creek From Francis Mabry descends Judith Mabry grandmother of Colonel Richard Cyril Avery who was born in Surry, Virginia. He married first Sarah Henderson, secondly Sarah Wyche and third, Fortune Barrow. Through these families a marriage that is descended through the famous Tipton's of England and Burns of Scotland are several living heir apparent to the throne of England descended through Isiah Burns and Ruth Susannah Barnes.

Per the history of Parliament, Richard Denys was involved in a 'protracted' dispute over the manor house of Siston. Legal ownership had been in question due to Richard's uncle, Sir Maurice Denys having to mortgage much of his estates of which he owned extensive property in Gloucestershire and a lesser amount in Kent. Richard was heir to Sir Maurice, yet at the time of his succession much of the property which had been mortgaged depleted the inheritance value.

Sir Walter Denys, Richards father, initially heir to Sir Maurice was responsible for debts as large as £5,500 owed to the crown for Sir Maurice's account as Treasurer of Calais. Sir Maurice had also mortgaged Siston manor to two London merchants and at his death in 1563 a disagreement lasting through August 1574, between Richard Denys and a man named Robert Wekes aka 'Wicks', where both were claiming the manor of Siston, resulted in an intersession with the Privy Council. The decision was in favour of Richard Denys. In 1609, Richard Denys's will was probated after a judgment of fifteen years earlier was 'set aside'.

=== Billingsley, Trotman, Rawlins ===
It was conveyed to Queen Elizabeth in unclear circumstances involving a deliberate mortgage fraud, to settle a Crown debt of the Denys's. Sir Maurice Denys or Dennis built a house which cost around £3,000. The park could hold 1000 fallow deer, and there were coal mines. Maurice's nephew Richard Denys and his son Walter Dennis sold the manor to a speculator, Robert Wicks.

Wicks sold it in 1608 to Sir Henry Billingsley Jr., thence through temporary hands by sale in 1651 to Samuel Trotman Esq. It remained in the Trotman family for 252 years including the tenures of Fiennes Boughton Newton Dickenson, who married Harriette Elizabeth Trotman, the heiress of the Trotman line, and his eldest son who sold it in 1903 to Mr J. Ernest Rawlins, a buccaneering pioneer of the English Colony in Hanford, California, who having left England as a young man in 1877, farmed, played polo, set up a bank, a coal mine, brick factory, and built an opera house. Rawlins sold the manor in 1935, seemingly having suffered in the Wall Street crash, and the historic contents of Siston Court were dispersed at auction. In 1940 the empty house served evacuated children from London's East-End. The Court is now divided into apartments in separate occupation.

== Bibliography ==
- Bindoff, S. T. (1982). The House of Commons 1509–1558. London. 2. pp. 31–34, 36–37.
- "Biographies of Sir M. Denys & Sir W. Denys-Roskell, J. S. et al." The House of Commons 1386–1421. Stroud, 1992. 2. pp. 771–772.
- "Biographies of Sir G. Denys, Chantler, P." History of the Ancient Family of Dennis of Glamorgan and Gloucestershire. South Molton, 2010
- Clark, Col. G. T. (1886) Limbus Patrum Morganiae et Glamorganiae: Being the Genealogies of the Older Families of the Lordships of Morgan and Glamorgan.
- T. Hearne. (ed.) (1726). John of Glastonbury, Chonica sive Historia de Rebus Glastoniensibus. Oxford. 2 p. 379.
- Jeayes, I. H. (ed.) (1892). Charters and Muniments at Berkeley Castle. Bristol. Charter no. 4, c. Nov. 1153, pp. 4–5.
- John of Worcester, iii, 174–75
- Pipe Roll 31 Henry I, p. 133
- Robinson, W. J. "Siston Court". West Country Manors. Bristol, 1930. pp. 168–172.
- SISTON COURT, Siston – 1231511 | Historic England
- Scott Thomson, G. (1930). Two Centuries of Family History. London, 1930. Appendix D pp. 324–328 (Russell Pedigree)
- Stacy, N. (February 1999) "Henry of Blois and the Lordship of Glastonbury." The English Historical Review, Oxford. 114
