= Nicholas Martyn =

English politician

Member of Parliament for Devon
- In office 1646–1648

High Sheriff of Devon
- In office November 1639 - ?

Personal details
- Born: 12 April 1593
- Died: 25 March 1653 (aged 59) Nether Exe, Devon, England
- Spouse: Elizabeth Symes
- Children: 1+
- Parent: William Martyn (father)
- Education: Broadgates Hall, Oxford

Sir Nicholas Martyn (12 April 1593 – 25 March 1653) was an English politician who sat in the House of Commons from 1646 to 1648.

== Biography ==
Martyn was the son of Sir William Martyn and his wife Susan Prestwood, of Exeter. He was educated at Broadgates Hall, Oxford matriculating on 8 March 1611, at the age of 17. He became a student of the Middle Temple in 1613. He was knighted by King James I at his Court at Newmarket on 12 February 1624. He was landowner of Oxton and Kenton and in November 1639 he became High Sheriff of Devon.

In 1641, in a year of plots and treasons, Martyn was proclaimed a traitor by the king, and he was excepted from the offer of a general pardon together with Sir George Chudleigh, Sir John Northcote, and Sir Samuel Rolle. He was included in an order clearing proclaimed persons issued on 7 December 1642. In June 1646, he was elected Member of Parliament for Devon in the Long Parliament. He was added to the committee of militia for Devon in 1648 and was excluded under Pride's Purge at the end of the year.

Martyn died at Nether Exe at the age of 59. It is said that before he died, as he lay sick at his house, one of the bells of the church began to toll of its own accord and continued for about a quarter of an hour until the time of his death. A monument was erected in Kenton church.

Martyn married Elizabeth Symes, of Pounsford, Somerset. His daughter, who married a wollen draper of Watling Street in the city, provided sanctuary for the five members that King Charles tried to arrest in the House of Commons.

Parliament of England
| Preceded by Sir Samuel Rolle; Sir Edward Seymour, 3rd Baronet | Member of Parliament for Devon; 1646–1648; With: Sir Samuel Rolle 1646–1647; William Morice 1648 | Succeeded by Not represented in Rump Parliament |
