= John Lucy (disambiguation) =

John Lucy was a sailor and Medal of Honor recipient.

John Lucy may also refer to:

- John A. Lucy, American linguist and psychologist
- John Lucy (MP) for Gloucestershire
