= Nicholas Seymour =

Nicholas Seymour may refer to:

- Nicholas Seymour (musician)
- Nicholas Seymour (MP) for Gloucestershire
