= James Clifford =

James Clifford may refer to:

- James Clifford (musician) (1622–1698), English divine and musician
- James Clifford (artist) (1936–1987), Australian Modernist painter
- James Clifford (historian) (born 1945), historian and professor at the University of California, Santa Cruz
- James Clifford (MP), member of parliament for Gloucestershire
