= Robert Whittington (MP) =

English politician (died 1423/1424)

Member of Parliament for Gloucester
- In office November 1384 (first term) – April 1414 (sixth and final term)

Personal details
- Born: Robert Whittington Pauntley, Gloucestershire, England
- Died: 1423/24 Pauntley, Gloucestershire, England

Robert Whittington (died 1423/24) was the member of Parliament for the constituency of Gloucestershire for multiple parliaments from November 1384 to April 1414.

== Early life ==
Robert Whittington was the son of Sir William Whittington of Pauntley, Gloucestershire, England and probably Joan Maunsell, daughter of William Maunsell. His younger brother was Richard 'Dick' Whittington, three time Lord Mayor of London. Upon the death of his elder brother William before August 1379, he inherited a steady income as well as the manor of Staunton as he was also the heir to Robert Staunton. In 1412, his total annual value of property was given as £20.

== Career ==
Robert was a member of a Whittington line of Members of Parliament going back to his grandfather, William Whittington, who sat in the House of Commons in 1327, his father William who sat there in 1348 and his eldest brother William who sat there in October 1377. Robert served six separate times in Parliament representing Gloucestershire in November 1384, 1391, January 1404, 1406, 1411, and April 1414.

In March 1375, Robert was called to serve at the behest of Edward, Lord Despenser, in Brittany, but after Edward's death he did not travel there to serve. He did represent Edward's widow, Lady Elizabeth Despenser, as surety at the Exchequer later in 1388.

In 1382 and beyond, Robert served in various positions within the local government in Gloucestershire as sheriff, justice of the peace, alnager, tax collector, coroner, forester and four terms as escheator.

In 1400, Robert was granted for life Corse Chase, formerly owned by the then disgraced Thomas, Lord Despenser, and an additional fee in the amount of £12 from the manor of Stoke Orchard. In August of the next year, he was in attendance at the meeting of the Great Council representing Gloucestershire.

Robert cemented familial ties with his long time friend John Browning by acting as the godfather for his son William and arranging his only son Guy's marriage to John's daughter Cecily.

After the death of Richard 'Dick' Whittington in March 1423, Robert had already secured the manor of Over Lyppiat which he and his son Guy had claimed Richard set aside in trust for them. According to family history, Richard gave Robert a collar denoting his service to the House of Lancaster and several other special household items.

== Will and Death ==
Robert's will was drafted on 29 April 1423, and probably died before July of that year. He requested that he be buried in the church at Pauntley and a chaplain preside over the service for one year for he, his parents, John Browning and Sybil Staunton, and paupers. Probate for his will was granted on 13 February 1424.
