= Vintry =

Ward of the City of London

Coordinates: 51.511°N 0.0934°W

- Ward
- Location within Greater London
- Vintry ward boundaries since 2013
- OS grid reference: TQ319812
- Sui generis: City of London
- Administrative area: Greater London
- Region: London
- Country: England
- Sovereign state: United Kingdom
- Post town: LONDON
- Postcode district: EC4
- Dialling code: 020
- Police: City of London
- Fire: London
- Ambulance: London
- UK Parliament: Cities of London and Westminster
- London Assembly: City and East

Vintry is one of the 25 wards of the City of London. Located within it is the City end of Southwark Bridge and, adjacent to that, the hall of the Worshipful Company of Vintners, the City livery company for the wine trade.

The ward's boundary is formed by Cannon Street to the north, College Hill and Cousin Lane to the east, the River Thames to the south, and its western edge follows an unusual line along part of Little Trinity Lane, Lambeth Hill and Distaff Lane.

The Christopher Wren-designed church St James Garlickhythe is within Vintry ward, near Mansion House tube station. In medieval times, French wine and garlic were landed at the nearby Garlickhythe ('garlic dock'). This circumstance led to the church being part of the route for English pilgrims travelling to the cathedral of Santiago de Compostela in Spain, which is sacred to the memory of St James the Great.

The ward contained Whittington's Longhouse, a 128-seat public toilet gifted by Dick Whittington.

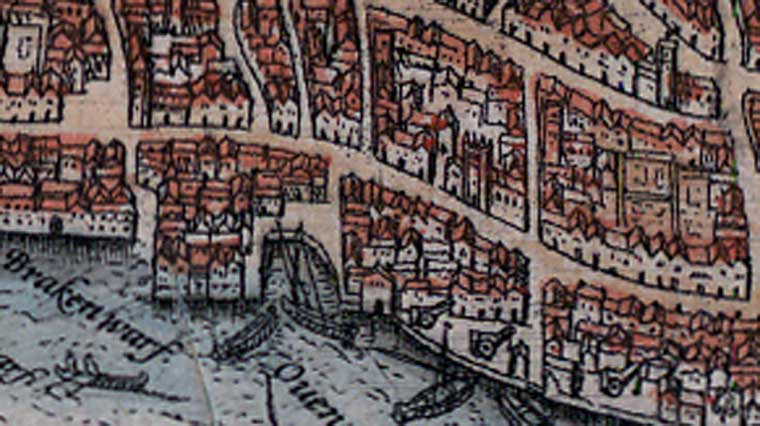
Vintry in a 1572 map by Agas

== Politics ==
Vintry is one of 25 wards in the City of London, each electing an alderman to the Court of Aldermen and commoners (the City equivalent of a councillor) to the Court of Common Council of the City of London Corporation.

Only electors who are freemen of the City are eligible to stand for election.

== Former churches ==
John Stow's A Survay of London lists four churches in Vintry ward:

14. In the Vintrie ward 4.
S. Michael Paternoſter in the Royall ſometime a colledge.
S. Thomas Apoſtles.
S. Martin in the Vintrie.
S. Iames at Garlicke Hith.
