= Whittington's Longhouse =

Former public toilet in the City of London

Coordinates: 51.510°N 0.092°W

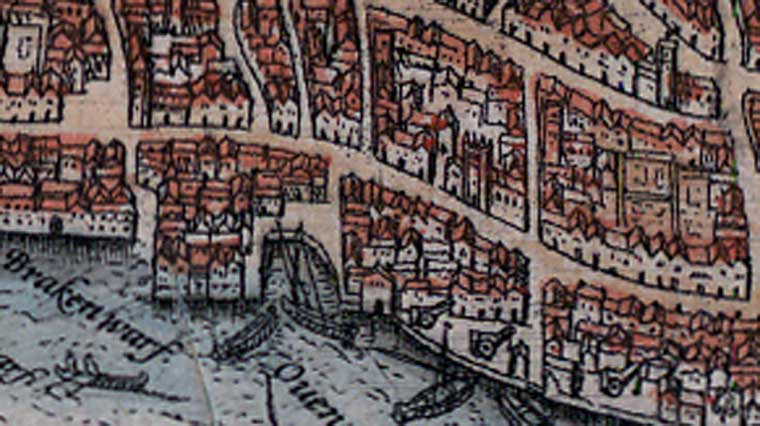
Vintry ward in 1572

Whittington's Longhouse (or Whittington's Longhouse and Almshouse) was a public toilet in Cheapside, London, constructed with money given or bequeathed by Richard Whittington, Lord Mayor of London. The toilet had 128 seats: 64 for men and 64 for women. It operated from around 1 May 1421, until the seventeenth century.

== History ==
The Longhouse, though it was not London's first public toilet, was the first public toilet in the capital with separate provision for the sexes.

The Longhouse, and the similarly financed almshouse for five or six parishioners constructed above it, was built by the parish of St Martin Vintry, on a long dock over the Thames. It was on Walbrook Street, at the time an actual brook, approximately where the modern Bell Wharf Lane is, and was "flushed by the Thames". The waste was deposited in a gully which was washed by the tides twice a day – the Thames being tidal there.

Rexroth in his 2007 book Deviance and Power in Late Medieval London argues that with the construction of the almshouse above the privies: "pauperes were assigned new households" where shame had been banished, due to the sex segregation. By the seventeenth century, the almshouse was being let on a commercial basis, possibly even as warehousing.

In 1666, the Longhouse was destroyed in the Great Fire of London and rebuilt on a more modest scale. The new building had six male and six female seats. Apart from a period where the lessees kept it locked, it continued in use until at least 1851, as it is mentioned in an 80-year lease that commenced that year. In a 1935 lease, no mention is made, and it is assumed the facilities were by that time closed. After the Second World War, the site was rebuilt in 1953 as part of "Redevelopment unit number 10". As of 2015, there is a Bell Wharf Lane public toilet.

The Longhouse and the other gifts to London, notably improvements to the water supply, a more substantial almshouse and schools and hospitals, are credited with raising the profile of Dick Whittington among Londoners, and for leading to the legends that surround his name. Longhouse became a byword for privy, presumably derived from Whittington's Longhouse.
