= Robert Poyntz =

Robert Poyntz or Pointz may refer to:

- Robert Pointz (died 1665), English landowner and politician
- Robert Poyntz (MP died 1439), MP for Gloucestershire
- Robert Poyntz (died 1520), lord of the manor of Iron Acton in Gloucestershire
