= Silvester Sedborough =

16th-century English politician

Silvester Sedborough (1515/16-1551), of Porlock, Somerset, was an English politician.

== Family ==
Sedborough was the eldest son of William Sedborough of Porlock and Joan, a sister and coheiress of Jerome Bratton of Porlock. Silvester Sedborough married twice, firstly to Anne Staveley, by whom he had one son, Robert, and two daughters. By 1550, he had married a woman named Mary.

== Career ==
He was a member (MP) of the parliament of England for Bath in 1545.

Parliament of England
Preceded by ? ?	Member of Parliament for Bath; 1545; With: Matthew Colthurst	Succeeded by Richard Denys; John Clerke
