= Gloucestershire (constituency) =

Parliamentary constituency in the United Kingdom, 1801–1832

- Former county constituency for the House of Commons

1290–1832
- Seats: two

The constituency of Gloucestershire was a UK Parliamentary constituency. After it was abolished under the 1832 Electoral Reform Act, two new constituencies, West Gloucestershire and East Gloucestershire, were created.

Gloucestershire was a constituency of the House of Commons of the Parliament of England, then of the Parliament of Great Britain from 1707 to 1800 and of the Parliament of the United Kingdom from 1801 to 1832. It was represented by two Knights of the Shire.

== Boundaries ==
The constituency consisted of the historic county of Gloucestershire, excluding the part of the city of Bristol in the geographical county. Bristol had the status of a county of itself after 1373. Although Gloucestershire contained a number of other parliamentary boroughs, each of which elected two MPs in its own right for part of the period when Gloucestershire was a constituency, these were not excluded from the county constituency. Owning property within such boroughs could confer a vote at the county election. This was not the case, though, for Bristol.

== Members of Parliament ==
Roman numerals are used to differentiate MPs with the same name, who are not holders of a title with different succession numbers. It is not suggested that the people involved would have used Roman numerals in this way.

== 1290–1339 ==
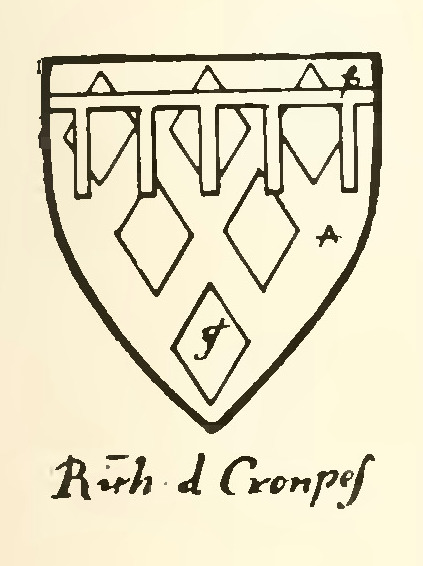
Richard de Croupes shield

Constituency created (1290)

- 1290: Richard de la More and Giles de Berkeley
- 1295: Walter de Helyon and Robert de Berkeley
- 1296: Sir John de Sancto Laudo and Sir Richard de Croupes
- 1298: Robert de Berkeley and John de Langley
- 1301: John de Acton and Sir Richard de Croupes
- 1302: Peter Crok and William de Wauton
- 1305: Thomas de Botiler (or Botteley) and John Bisshop
- 1306: Nicholas de Kyngeston and John de Bradenstok
- 1307: (Jan) Sir William Mansel and Nicholas de Bathonia
- 1309: Sir John Bisshop and Sir John de Vivonia
- 1313: (Mar) Nicholas de Sancto Mauro (or Seymour) and William Tracy.
- 1313: (Sep) Sir John Bisshop and William Mansel
- 1311: (Aug and Nov) John de Langley and Sir William Mansel
- 1314: (Sep) Richard de la Riviere and William Mansel
- 1315: Sir Nicholas de Kyngeston and Sir John de Rous
- 1316: (Jan) (One Member only) Roger Gacelyn
- 1316: (Apr) Stephen de la More and John de Langley
- 1316: (Jul) (One Member) Stephen de la More
- 1318: Sir William Corbet and Sir Walter Gacelyn
- 1319: Sir John de Sancto Laudo and Sir William Corbet
- 1320: William Corbet (MP fl.1318) and Henry de Preyers
- 1321: William Mansel and John de Selers
- 1322: (May) Sir Richard de la Riviere and Sir William Tracy
- 1322: (Nov) John de Sancto Laudo and Fulk de Penebrugg
- 1324: (Jan) John le Botiler and William de Bradewell
- 1324: (Oct) Henry de Brockworth and Walter de Ocle
- 1325: Walter de Cirencester and William de Cheltenham
- 1326: Sir Richard de la Riviere and William de Arches
- 1327: William de Whitenton and Andrew de Pendok
- 1328: (Feb) John de Sevenhampton and Robert Dastyn
- 1328: (Apr) William de Cheltenham and Robert Dastyn
- 1328: (Jul) John de Gyse and John de Berkeley
- 1330: (Mar) John de Cromhale and William de Tyderinton
- 1330: (Nov) Henry de Brockworth and Robert Dapetot
- 1331: William de Cheltenham and William de Bradewell
- 1332: (Mar) John le Botiller and William de Bradewell
- 1332: (Sep) William de Cheltenham and Henry de Brockworth
- 1332: (Dec) William de Cheltenham and William de Bradewell
- 1334: (Feb) William de Cheltenham and Richard de la Hale
- 1334: (Sep) William de Cheltenham and Henry de Brockworth
- 1335: William de Cheltenham and John de Cromhale
- 1336: (Mar) Henry de Brockworth and John de Chadderley
- 1336: (Sep) Walter de Combe and William de Cheltenham
- 1337: (Jan) Thomas de Seymour and John Golafre
- 1338: (Feb) Henry de Clifford and Richard Fraunceys
- 1338: (Jul) William de Cheltenham and Henry de Clifford
- 1339: (Jan) John de Cheltenham and Henry de Corsham
- 1339: (Oct) William de Insula and John le Botiller

== 1340–1385 ==
- 1340: (Jan) Sir John de Suydle and Sir Philip Joce
- 1340: (Mar) Thomas le Botiller and John de Berkeley, of Dursley
- 1341: John FitzNichol de Hulle and Edmund Blount
- 1343: Henry de Clifford and William de Westhale
- 1344: Michael de Assh' and William de Westhale
- 1346: Elias de Fylton and John de Clopton
- 1348: (Jan) Simon Basset and John de Weston
- 1348: (Mar) Sir William Whittington and Thomas de la Mare
- 1351: Robert Palet and John Serjaunt
- 1352: (Jan) John de Weston and Nicholas Crykkelade
- 1352: (Aug) (One Member). Edward de Cardiff
- 1353: (One Member). Thomas le Botiller
- 1354: Thomas le Botiller and Thomas de la Mare
- 1355: William Mansel and Peter Crook
- 1357: Robert de Shareshull and Richard de Hildesley
- 1358: Thomas de Berkeley and Sir John Tracy, chevalier
- 1360: Sir Adam de Shareshull, chevalier and Maurice de Cheltenham
- 1361: Sir Simon Basset, miles and Sir Thomas Moigne, miles
- 1362: Simon Basset and Thomas Moigne
- 1363: John Tracy and Nicholas Berkeley
- 1365: John de Bromwich and John Slaughter
- 1366: John Tracy and John Slaughter
- 1368: John Tracy and John Pointz
- 1369: (Apr) John Pointz and John Tracy
- 1371: {Feb} John Pointz and Robert Palet
- 1371: {Jun} (One Member) John Pointz
- 1372: John Clifford and John Lucy
- 1373: John Giffard and Thomas Hathewy
- 1376: Sir John Thorp, chevalier and Sir John Giffard, chevalier
- 1377: {Jan} Peter de Veel and Edmund de Bradeston
- 1377: (Oct) John Thorp and William Whitenton
- 1378: {Oct} Peter le Veel and Edmund de Bradeston
- 1379: Edmund de Bradeston and John Giffard
- 1380: {Jan} Maurice Wythe and John Thorp
- 1380: {Nov} Thomas Berkeley and William Heyberer
- 1381: John Thorp and Peter Veel
- 1382: (May) John Thorp and Peter Veel
- 1382: (Oct) Thomas FitzNicol and Laurence Sebrok
- 1383: (Feb) Thomas FitzNichol and Ralph Waleys
- 1383: (Oct) Thomas FitzNichol and Ralph Waleys
- 1384: {Apr} Edmund de Bradeston and William Heyberer
- 1384: {Nov} Robert de Whittington and William Heyberer
- 1385: Sir Thomas FitzNichol and William Heyberer

== 1386–1421 ==
(Source: Roskell, 1992)

Election	First Member	Second Member
1386	Sir Thomas FitzNichol	William Hervy
1388 (Feb)	Sir John Berkeley	William Heyberer
1388 (Sept)	Sir John Berkeley	Sir Laurence Sebrooke
1390 (Jan)	Sir John Cheyne	Sir Laurence Sebrooke
1390 (Nov)	Sir Gilbert Denys	Thomas Berkeley
1391	Sir Maurice Berkeley	Robert Whittington
1393	Sir John Cheyne	Sir Thomas FitzNichol
1394	Sir John Cheyne	Sir Henry de la River
1395	Sir Thomas FitzNichol	Sir Gilbert Denys
1397 (Jan)	Sir Thomas Butler	Sir John Berkeley
1397 (Sept)	Hugh Mortimer	John Browning
1399	Sir John Cheyne	Sir Thomas FitzNichol
1401	John Browning	Sir Thomas FitzNichol
1402	Sir Maurice Russell	Sir Thomas FitzNichol
1404 (Jan)	Sir Maurice Russell	Robert Whittington
1404 (Oct)	Richard Mawarden	James Clifford
1406	Sir Thomas FitzNichol	Robert Whittington
1407	Sir Thomas FitzNichol	Thomas Mille
1410	Sir John Drayton	unknown
1411	Thomas Mille	Robert Whittington
1413 (Feb)	unknown	unknown
1413 (May)	Sir Thomas FitzNichol	Sir John Pauncefoot
1414 (April)	Robert Whittington	John Greville
1414 (Nov)	Sir Thomas FitzNichol	John Browning
1415	Sir Thomas FitzNichol	Robert Poyntz
1416 (Mar)	unknown	unknown
1416 (Oct)	unknown	unknown
1417	Robert Poyntz	Robert Greyndore
1419	John Greville	William Tracy
1420	Robert Greyndore	Guy Whittington
1421 (May)	John Greville	Guy Whittington
1421 (Dec)	(Sir) John Blaket	Sir John Pauncefoot

== 1422–1508 ==
Parliament	First Member	Second Member
1422 (Oct)	John Grevell	Robert Stranshawe
1423 (Oct)	John Grevell	Robert Stranshawe
1425 (Apr)	Sir Maurice Berkeley	John Grevell
1426 (Jan)	Robert Stranshawe	Robert Greyndore
1427 (Sep)	John Grevell	Guy Whittington
1429 (July)	John Langley	Sir Maurice Berkeley
1430 (Dec)	Nicholas Poyntz	Giles Brugges or Bridges
1432 (Apr)	John Langley	Guy Whittington
1433 (Jun)	Robert Greyndore	Robert Stranshawe
1435 (Jul)	John Langley	Thomas Mill
1436 (Dec)	John Langley	John Cassy
1442 (Jan)	William Tracy	John Langley
1447 (Jan)	Thomas Pauncefoot	John Cassy
1449 (Jan)	Thomas Mill	Thomas Pauncefoot
1449 (Oct)	William Gyfford	Thomas Derehurst
1450 (Oct)	John Barre	John Kemmyse
1455 (Jun)	Giles Brugges or Bridges	William Whittington
1460 (Sep)	Thomas Yonge	Thomas Bridges
1467 (May)	Maurice Berkeley	Thomas Herbert senior
1472 (Aug)	Sir Richard Beauchamp	Thomas Lymryk
1476	John Twynyho	
1478 (Jan)	Thomas Cokesey	John Twynyho
1491 (Sep)	Sir Edmond Montfort	Thomas Morton

== 1509–1558 ==
(Source: Bindoff (1982))

Parliament of 1510–23	No names known	No names known
Parliament of 1529	Sir William Kingston	Sir John Brydges
Parliament of 1536	Not known	Not known
Parliament of 1539	Sir William Kingston	Anthony Kingston
Parliament of 1542	?Sir Anthony Kingston	Not known
Parliament of 1545	Sir Anthony Kingston	Nicholas Arnold
Parliament of 1547	Sir Anthony Kingston	Sir Nicholas Poyntz
Parliament of 1553 (Mar)	Sir Anthony Kingston	Sir Nicholas Arnold
Parliament of 1553 (Oct)	Sir Edmund Brydges	Sir Anthony Hungerford
Parliament of 1554 (Apr)	Sir Giles Poole	Nicholas Wykes
Parliament of 1554 (Nov)	Arthur Porter	William Rede
Parliament of 1555	Sir Anthony Kingston	Sir Nicholas Arnold
Parliament of 1558	Sir Henry Jerningham	Sir Walter Denys

== 1559–1639 ==
Parliament	First Member	Second Member
1563 (Jan)	Nicholas Walshe	Richard Denys
1571 (Apr)	Sir Giles Poole	Sir Nicholas Poyntz
1572 (Apr)	Hon. Giles Bridges	Sir Nicholas Arnold
1576	Thomas Chester	Sir Nicholas Arnold
1581	Thomas Chester	Sir Thomas Porter
1584 (Nov)	Sir John Darcy	Hon. William Bruges or Bridges
1586 (Oct)	Hon. William Bridges	Sir William Wynter
1588 (Dec)	Sir Thomas Throckmorton	Edward Wynter
1593 (Jan)	Sir Henry Poole	Sir John Pointz
1597 (Sep)	Sir John Tracy	Sir John Hungerford
1601 (Sep)	Sir Edward Wynter	John Throckmorton
1604 (Mar)	Hon. Sir Thomas Berkeley	Sir Richard Berkeley, died in office and replaced 30 May 1604 by John Throckmorton
1614 (Mar)	Sir William Cooke	Richard Berkeley
1620 (Dec)	Sir Robert Tracy	Maurice Berkeley
1624 (Feb)	Sir Thomas Estcourt, died in office and replaced 20 Oct 1624 by Sir Maurice Berkeley	John Dutton
1625 (May)	Sir Maurice Berkeley	John Dutton
1626 (Jan)	Sir Robert Tracy	Sir Robert Pointz
1628 (Mar)	Sir Robert Pointz	Nathaniel Stephens
1629–1640	No Parliaments summoned	

== 1640–1832 ==
Election	First member	First party	Second member	Second party
1640, April	Sir Robert Tracy	Royalist	Sir Robert Cooke	Parliamentarian
1640, November	Nathaniel Stephens	Parliamentarian	John Dutton ^{1}	Royalist
c. 1644	Nathaniel Stephens	Parliamentarian	Sir John Seymour ^{2}	Parliamentarian
Gloucestershire's representation was increased to 3 nominated MPs in Barebones Parliament
1653	John Crofts; William Neast; Robert Holmes			
Gloucestershire's representation was increased to 5 elected MPs in the First and Second Parliaments of the Protectorate
1654	George Berkeley; Matthew Hale; John Howe; Christopher Guise; Sylvanus Wood			
1656	George Berkeley; John Howe; John Crofts; Baynham Throckmorton; William Neast			
Gloucestershire's representation was decreased to 2 MPs in the Third Parliament of the Protectorate and thereafter
1659, January	John Grobham Howe I		John Stephens	
1659, May	unknown		unknown	
1660, April 18	Edward Stephens		Matthew Hale	
17 April 1661	John Grobham Howe I		Sir Baynham Throckmorton, 2nd Bt ^{3}	
21 December 1664	John Grobham Howe I		Sir Baynham Throckmorton, 3rd Bt	
26 February 1679	Sir John Guise, 2nd Bt		Sir Ralph Dutton, Bt	
18 March 1685	Marquess of Worcester		Sir Robert Atkyns	
18 January 1689	Sir John Guise, 2nd Bt	Whig	Sir Ralph Dutton, Bt	Whig
11 December 1695	Thomas Stephens I	Whig	Sir Ralph Dutton, Bt	Whig
3 August 1698	John Grobham Howe II	Tory	Sir Richard Cocks, Bt	Whig
3 December 1701	Maynard Colchester	Whig	Sir Richard Cocks, Bt	Whig
6 August 1702	Maynard Colchester	Whig	John Grobham Howe II	Tory
16 May 1705	Maynard Colchester	Whig	Sir John Guise, 3rd Bt	Whig
12 May 1708	Matthew Moreton	Whig	Sir John Guise, 3rd Bt	Whig
25 October 1710	Matthew Moreton	Whig	John Symes Berkeley	Tory
23 September 1713	Thomas Stephens II	Whig	John Symes Berkeley	Tory
9 February 1715	Thomas Stephens II	Whig	Matthew Moreton	Whig
30 March 1720	Hon. Henry Berkeley		Matthew Moreton	Whig
22 June 1720	Hon. Henry Berkeley		Edmund Bray	
28 March 1722	Hon. Henry Berkeley		Kinard de la Bere	
6 September 1727	Hon. Henry Berkeley		Sir John Dutton, Bt	
8 May 1734	Thomas Chester	Tory	Benjamin Bathurst	Tory
12 May 1741	Thomas Chester	Tory	Norborne Berkeley	
27 April 1763	Thomas Chester	Tory	Thomas Tracy	
23 November 1763	Edward Southwell		Thomas Tracy	
6 August 1770	Edward Southwell		Sir William Guise, Bt	
6 May 1776	William Bromley-Chester	Tory ^{4}	Sir William Guise, Bt	
24 January 1781	James Dutton		Sir William Guise, Bt	
28 April 1783	James Dutton		Hon. George Cranfield Berkeley	Whig ^{5}
12 April 1784	Thomas Master	Tory ^{5}	Hon. George Cranfield Berkeley	Whig ^{5}
2 June 1796	Marquess of Worcester	Tory	Hon. George Cranfield Berkeley	Whig ^{5}
14 November 1803	Lord Edward Somerset	Tory	Hon. George Cranfield Berkeley	Whig ^{5}
18 May 1810	Lord Edward Somerset	Tory	Viscount Dursley	
7 February 1811	Lord Edward Somerset	Tory	Sir Berkeley Guise, Bt	Whig
10 May 1831	Hon. Henry Reynolds-Moreton	Whig	Sir Berkeley Guise, Bt	Whig
Constituency abolished (1832)

Notes:-

- ^{1} Dutton was disabled from sitting for adhering to the King and joining the King's Oxford Parliament, c. 1644.
- ^{2} Seymour was excluded from Parliament by the Army, c. 1648.
- ^{3} Father of the Baynham Throckmorton elected in 1656 and 1664.
- ^{4} Stooks Smith classifies Bromley-Chester as Tory in the 1776 by-election, but gives no label in subsequent elections.
- ^{5} Stooks Smith classifies Berkeley as Whig in the 1776 by-election (which he lost), but gives no label in subsequent elections before the general election of 1790. Both Berkeley and Master are classified by party from 1790.

== Elections ==
Gloucestershire by-election, May 1776 (1 seat)
Party	Candidate	Votes	%	±%
Tory	William Bromley-Chester	2,919	50.4	n/a
Whig	George Cranfield Berkeley	2,873	49.6	n/a
Majority		46	0.8	n/a
Turnout		5,792		n/a
Registered electors				

== See also ==
- List of former United Kingdom Parliament constituencies
- Unreformed House of Commons

== Sources ==
- Cobbett's Parliamentary history of England, from the Norman Conquest in 1066 to the year 1803 (London: Thomas Hansard, 1808)
- The House of Commons 1690-1715, by Eveline Cruickshanks, Stuart Handley and D.W. Hayton (Cambridge University Press 2002)
- The Parliaments of England by Henry Stooks Smith (1st edition published in three volumes 1844–50), second edition edited (in one volume) by F.W.S. Craig (Political Reference Publications 1973))
- Leigh Rayment's Historical List of MPs – Constituencies beginning with "G" (part 1)
- Roskell, J.S. (ed.), The History of Parliament; The House of Commons 1386-1421, 4 vols., Stroud, 1992. Vol.1, p. 398
- Williams, W.R., Parliamentary History of the County of Gloucester, Hereford, 1898
