= William Rede (died 1558) =

English politician

William Rede (c. 1500 – 3 November 1558) was the member of Parliament for Cricklade in the parliament of 1529 and for Gloucestershire in November 1554.
