= Thomas Chester (died 1583) =

English politician

Thomas Chester (c. 1524 – 1583) was the member of Parliament for the constituency of Bristol for the parliament of 1563 and Gloucestershire for the parliament of 1572.

The son of a wealthy Bristol merchant William Chester (d. 1558), he served as sheriff of Bristol in 1559 before being elected to parliament for the city in 1567, when John Walshe became a judge. He became a major landowner through the purchase of the manor and hundred of Barton Regis. He subsequently bought the manor of [Almondsbury], where he established his family. When 1573 Giles Brydges succeeded to the family peerage, Chester was chosen to replace him as MP for Gloucestershire. He died in Bristol in 1583.
