= Richard Whittington =

Lord Mayor of London (c. 1354–1423)

Richard Whittington, 19th c. engraving after original c.1590 by Reginald Elstrack (1570 – after 1625). Original engraving depicted a skull, changed to a cat by print-seller Peter Stent to meet popular expectations. Arms: Whittington, FitzWaryn, Worshipful Company of Mercers, Merchant Adventurers Company of London; also two small shields with his merchant mark

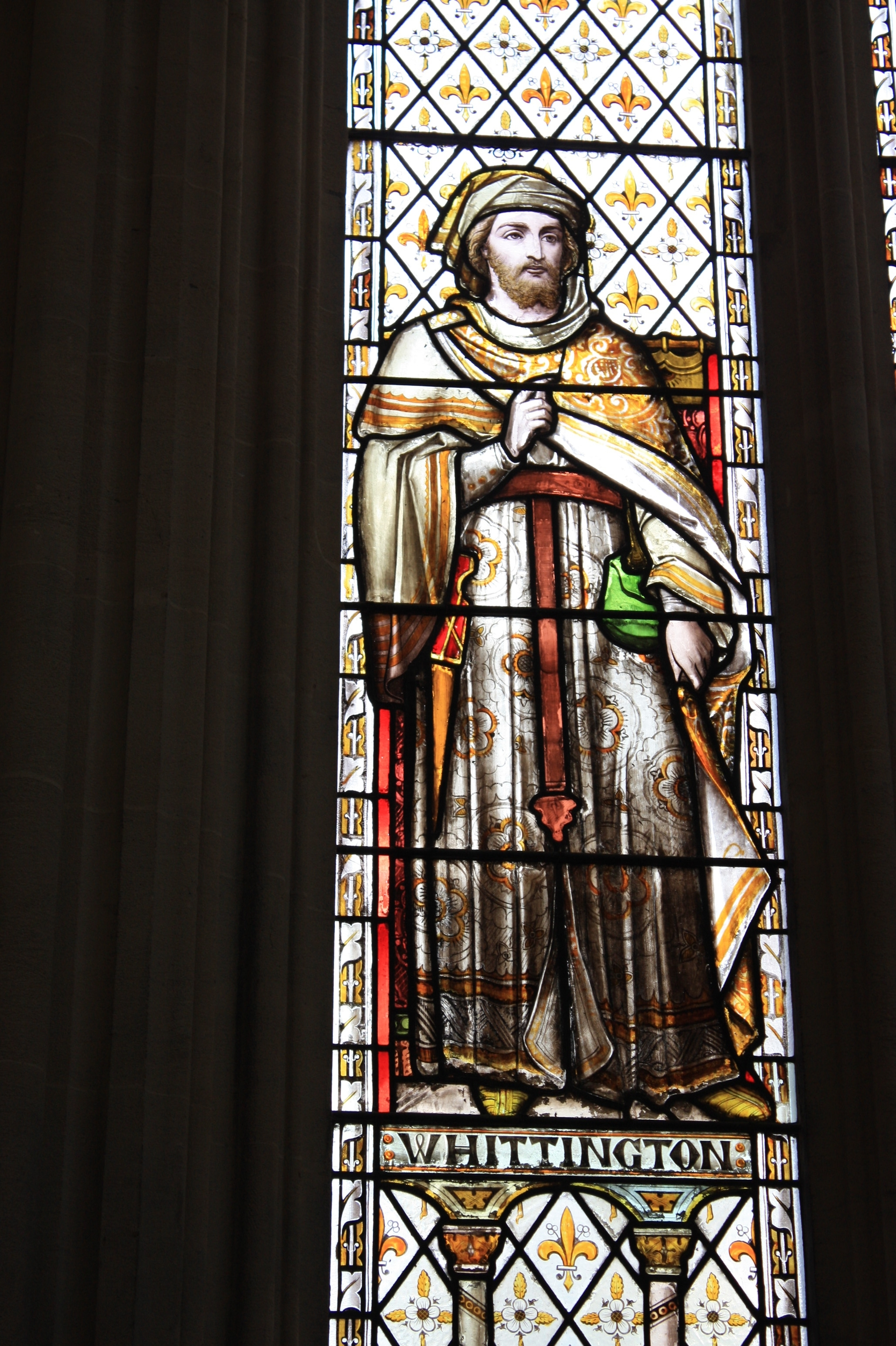
Richard Whittington, stained glass in the Guildhall, City of London

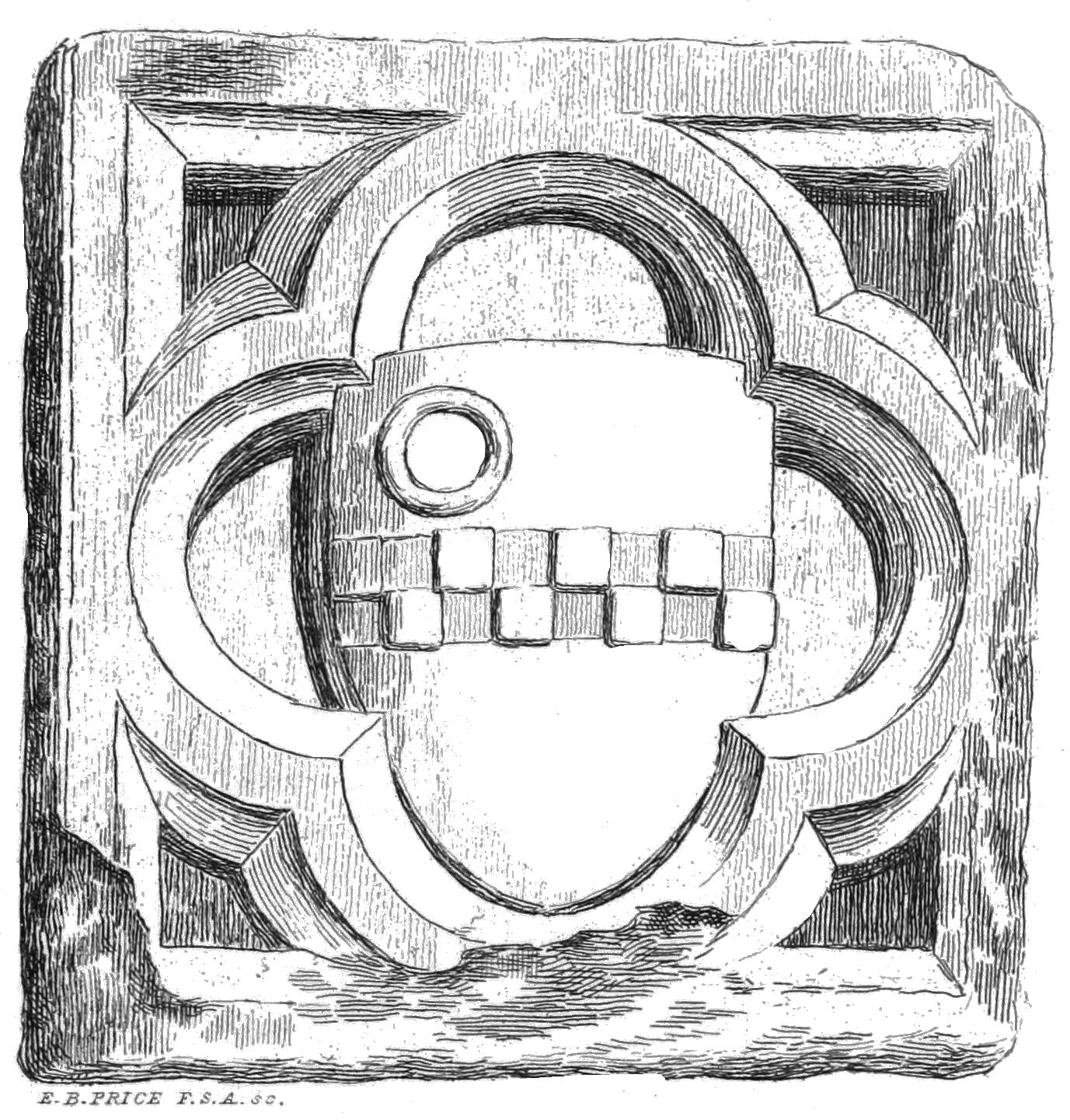
Arms of Richard Whittington: Gules, a fess chequy or and azure in the dexter chief an annulet or, the annulet being a difference of his paternal arms. As formerly visible sculpted within a quatrefoil on the Library of the Greyfriars, founded by him

Merchant mark of Richard Whittington, as shown in his portrait c.1590 by Reginald Elstrack

Richard Whittington (c. 1354 – March 1423) of the parish of St Michael Paternoster Royal, City of London, was an English merchant and politician of the late medieval period. He is also the real-life inspiration for the English folk tale Dick Whittington and His Cat. He was four times (appointed once, elected three times) Lord Mayor of London, a member of parliament and a Sheriff of London. In his lifetime he financed a number of public projects, such as drainage systems in poor areas of London, and a hospital ward for unmarried mothers. He bequeathed his fortune to form the Charity of Sir Richard Whittington which, over 600 years later, continues to assist people in need.

== Early life ==
He was born, in around 1354, into an ancient and wealthy Gloucestershire gentry family, the 3rd son of Sir William Whittington (d.1358) of Pauntley, in the Forest of Dean, Gloucestershire, a member of parliament, by his wife Joan Maunsell, a daughter of William Maunsell (or Mansel), MP for Gloucestershire, Sheriff of Gloucestershire in 1313. His elder brothers were Robert Whittington (d.1423/4), six times a Member of Parliament for Gloucestershire, and William Whittington, also MP for Gloucestershire, the eldest brother.

As a younger son, under the system of primogeniture he would not expect to inherit his father's estate, and thus was sent to the City of London to learn the trade of mercer through an apprenticeship. He was a contemporary of John Abbot who was the first mercer to leave property to the Mercers' Company to support a school.

== Career ==
Whittington became a successful merchant, dealing in valuable imports such as silks and velvets, both luxury fabrics, much of which he sold to royalty and nobility from about 1388. There is indirect evidence that he was also a major exporter to Europe of much-sought-after English woollen cloth such as broadcloth. From 1392 to 1394, he sold goods to King Richard II worth £3,500 (equivalent to £3,900,000 in 2025). He also began money-lending in 1388, preferring this to outward shows of wealth such as buying property. By 1397, he was lending large sums of money to the king.

In 1384, Whittington had become a Councilman of the City of London. In 1392, he was one of the City's delegation to the king at Nottingham Castle after the Fleet Street riot, at which the king seized the City of London's lands because of alleged misgovernment. By 1393, he had become an alderman and was appointed Sheriff of the City of London by the incumbent mayor, William Staundone, as well as becoming a member of the Worshipful Company of Mercers. Two days after the death of Adam Bamme in June 1397, Whittington was imposed on the City by the king as his replacement as Lord Mayor of London. Within days, Whittington had negotiated with the king a deal in which the City bought back its liberties for £10,000 (equivalent to £9,100,000 in 2025). He was formally elected as mayor by a grateful populace on 13 October 1397.

The deposition of King Richard II in 1399 did not affect Whittington and it is thought that he merely acquiesced in the coup led by Bolingbroke, later King Henry IV, whom Whittington had long supplied with merchandise. He also lent the new king substantial amounts of money. He was elected mayor again in 1406 and 1419, and during 1407 served as mayor of The Staple at Calais, representing that town's merchants. In 1416 he became a member of parliament for the City of London. He was also influential with King Henry V, Henry IV's son and successor, to whom he lent large amounts of money and for whom he served on several Royal Commissions of oyer and terminer; for example, Henry V employed him to supervise the expenditure to complete Westminster Abbey. Despite being a moneylender himself, he was sufficiently trusted and respected to sit as a judge in usury trials in 1421. Whittington also collected revenues and import duties. A long dispute with the Worshipful Company of Brewers over standard prices and measures of ale was won by Whittington.

== Marriage ==
Left: arms of FitzWarin, Baron FitzWarin: Quarterly per fess indented argent and gules; right a differenced version (with ermine) as shown, for his wife, in the portrait of Richard Whittington circa 1590 by Reginald Elstrack, also known to have been used by the family of Baron FitzWarin

In 1402, at the age of 48, he married Alice FitzWaryn (d.1411), but she died without producing any children. She was one of the two daughters and joint heiresses of Sir Ivo FitzWaryn (1347–1414), of Caundle Haddon in Dorset, and of Wantage then in Berkshire (now Oxfordshire) (whose monumental brass survives in Wantage Church). As a member of parliament variously for the county seats of Dorset, Devon, and Somerset; a son of Sir William FitzWaryn, Knight of the Garter, of Whittington Castle in Shropshire, who was probably a son of Fulk FitzWarin, 3rd Baron FitzWarin (c.1315–1349), also of Whittington Castle in Shropshire and of Wantage, who were of an ancient and powerful family of Marcher Lords. A portrait of Richard Whittington circa 1590 by Reginald Elstrack shows his paternal heraldic arms and also for his wife a differenced version of the usual arms of Baron FitzWarin with ermine in the 1st and 4th quarters in place of argent, which variant was also used by Wiliam FitzWarin, a member of the Shropshire family, as depicted in the Gelre Armorial, c.1370–1414.

The last in the male line was Fulk FitzWarin, 7th Baron FitzWarin (1406–1420), whose eventual successor (via a female line) was William Bourchier, 9th Baron FitzWarin, second son of William Bourchier, 1st Count of Eu (1386–1420,) one of the wealthy noblemen to whom Richard Whittington lent money.

== Benefactions ==
In his lifetime Whittington donated much of his profit to the city, and he left further endowments by his will. He financed:

- the rebuilding of the Guildhall
- a ward for unmarried mothers at St Thomas' Hospital
- drainage systems for areas around Billingsgate and Cripplegate
- the rebuilding of his parish church, St Michael Paternoster Royal
- a public toilet seating 128 called Whittington's Longhouse in the parish of St Martin Vintry that was cleansed by the River Thames at high tide
- most of Greyfriars library

He also provided accommodation for his apprentices in his own house. He passed a law prohibiting the washing of animal skins by apprentices in the River Thames in cold, wet weather because many young boys had died through hypothermia or drowning in the strong river currents.

== Death and burial ==
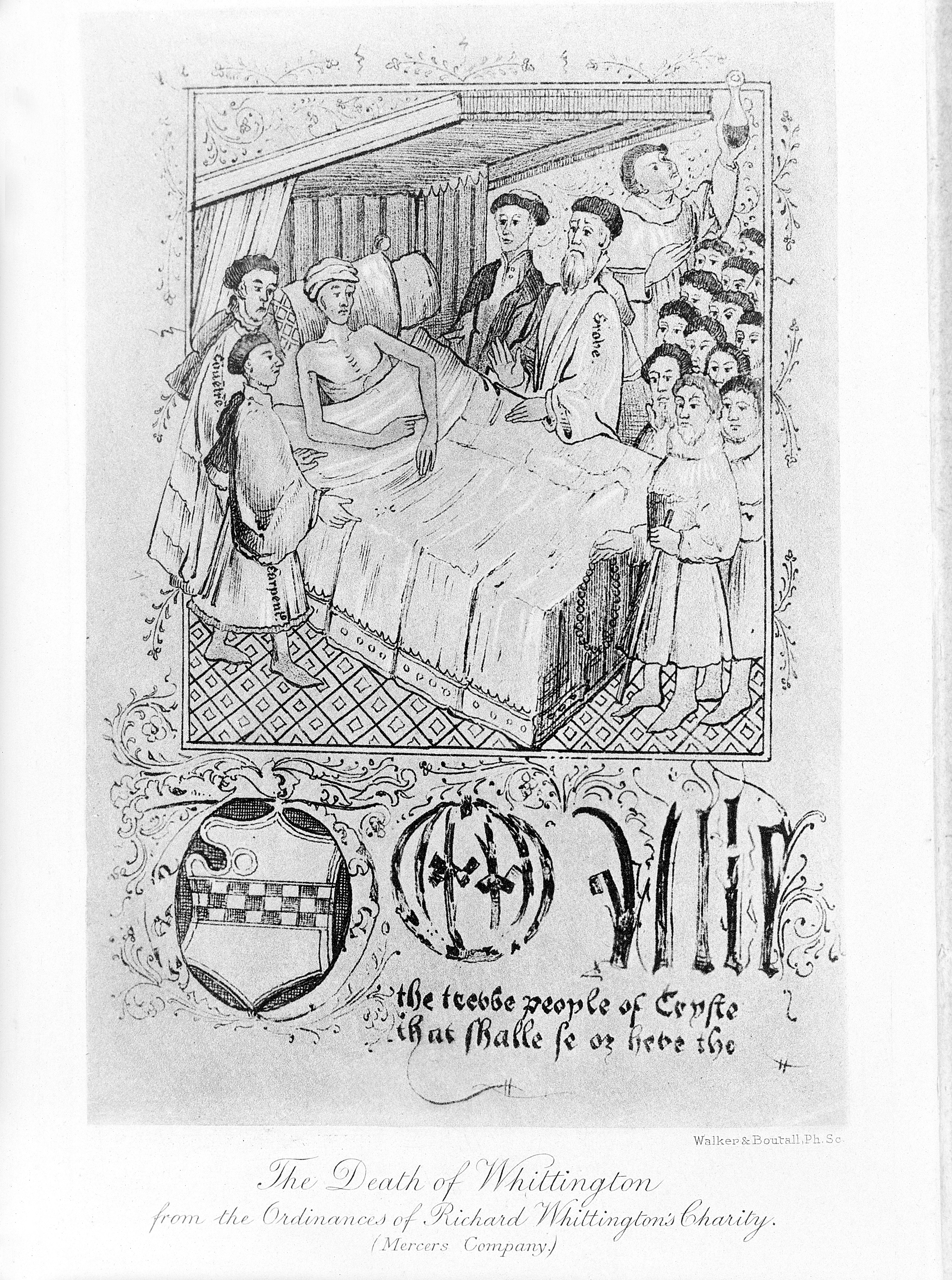
Whittington on his deathbed: at his side the four executors of his will, John Coventre, John White, clerk, John Carpenter, and William Grove, with many of the beneficiaries of his charities at the foot of his bed. A physician examines a bottle of urine.

Whittington died in March 1423, aged around 68 or 69, and was buried in the church of St Michael Paternoster Royal, to which he had donated large sums during his lifetime. The tomb is now lost, and the mummified cat found in the church tower in 1949 during a search for its location probably dates to the time of the Wren restoration.

== Bequests ==
Having died childless, Whittington left £7,000 in his will to charity, in those days a large sum, equivalent to £7,500,000 in 2025. Some of this was used to:

- rebuild Newgate Prison and Newgate and accommodation in it for the Sheriffs and Recorder, which is the forerunner of that in the Old Bailey
- build the first library in Guildhall (the ancestor of the modern Guildhall Library)
- repair St Bartholomew's Hospital
- create his "college" i.e. almshouse and hospital, originally at St Michael's
- install some of the first public drinking fountains

The almshouses were relocated in 1966 to Felbridge, near East Grinstead. Sixty elderly women and a few married couples currently live in them. The Whittington Charity also disburses money each year to the needy through the Mercers' Company.

To mark his bequests, the Whittington hospital at Archway in the London Borough of Islington was named after him on its establishment in 1948.

== Dick Whittington—stage character ==
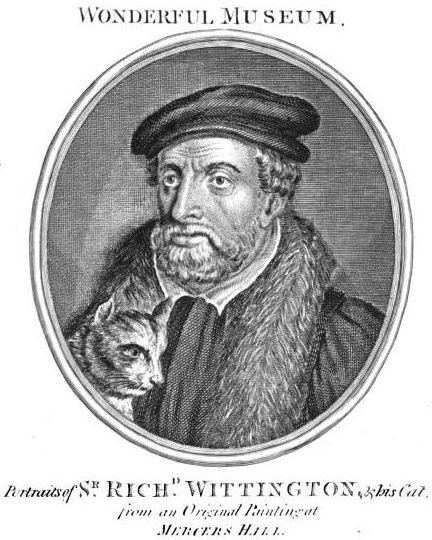
"Portraits of Sir Richard Whittington & his cat". Printed in New Wonderful Museum, Vol. III (1805), "from the original painting at Mercers' Hall".

The gifts left in Whittington's will made him well known and he became a character in an English story that was adapted for the stage as a play, The History of Richard Whittington, of his lowe byrth, his great fortune, in February 1604. In the 19th century this became popular as a pantomime called Dick Whittington and His Cat, very loosely based on Richard Whittington. There are several versions of the traditional story, which tells how Dick, a boy from a poor Gloucestershire family, sets out for London to make his fortune, accompanied by, or later acquiring, his cat. At first he meets with little success, and is tempted to return home. However, on his way out of the city, whilst climbing Highgate Hill from modern-day Archway, he hears the Bow Bells of London ringing, and believes they are sending him a message. There is now a large hospital on Highgate Hill, named the Whittington Hospital, after this supposed episode. A traditional rhyme associated with this tale is:

Turn again, Whittington,
Once Lord Mayor of London!
Turn again, Whittington,
Twice Lord Mayor of London!
Turn again, Whittington,
Thrice Lord Mayor of London!

On returning to London, Dick embarks on a series of adventures. In one version of the tale, he travels abroad on a ship, and wins many friends as a result of the rat-catching activities of his cat; in another he sends his cat and it is sold to make his fortune. Eventually he does become prosperous, marries his master's daughter Alice Fitzwarren (the name of the real Whittington's wife), and is made Lord Mayor of London three times. The common belief that he served three rather than four times as Lord Mayor stems from the City's records 'Liber Albus' compiled at his request by the City Clerk John Carpenter wherein his name appears only three times as the remainder term of his deceased predecessor Adam Bamme and his own consequent term immediately afterwards appear as one entry for 1397.

As the son of gentry, Whittington was never very poor and there is no evidence that he kept a cat. Whittington may have become associated with a thirteenth-century Persian folktale about an orphan who gained a fortune through his cat; the tale was common throughout Europe at that time. Folklorists have suggested that the most popular legends about Whittington—that his fortunes were founded on the sale of his cat, who was sent on a merchant vessel to a rat-beset Eastern emperor—originated in a popular 17th-century engraving by Renold Elstracke in which his hand rested on a cat, but the picture only reflects a story already in wide circulation. Elstracke's oddly-shaped cat was in fact a later replacement by printseller Peter Stent for what had been a skull in the original, with the change being made to conform to the story already in existence, to increase sales.

There was also known to be a painted portrait of Whittington shown with a cat, hanging at Mercer Hall, but it was reported that the painting had been trimmed down to smaller size, and the date "1572" that appears there was something painted after the cropping, which raises doubt as to the authenticity of the date, though Malcolm who witnessed it c. early 1800s felt the date should be taken in good faith. The print published in The New Wonderful Museum (vol. III, 1805, pictured above) is presumably a replica of this painting.

== Bibliography ==
- The History of Sir Richard Whittington by T. H. (1885), from Project Gutenberg
