= Laurence Sebrooke =

Sir Laurence Sebrooke was the member of Parliament for the constituency of Gloucestershire for multiple parliaments from 1382 to 1390.
