= John Clerke (MP for Bath) =

16th-century English politician

John Clerke (by 1525 – 1554 or later), of Wookey, Somerset, was an English politician.

== Family ==
Clerke was the son of Thomas Clerke, who was MP for Wells in the same year that John represented nearby Bath.

== Career ==
He was a member (MP) of the parliament of England for Bath in 1547.

Parliament of England
Preceded by Matthew Colthurst; Silvester Sedborough	Member of Parliament for Bath; 1547; With: Richard Denys	Succeeded by ? ?
