= John de Langley =

14th-century English politician

John de Langley was the member of Parliament for Coventry in 1315. He was also an MP for Gloucestershire in 1311.
