= William Hervy =

Member of the Parliament of England

William Hervy (died c. 1400) was the member of Parliament for the constituency of Gloucestershire for the parliament of 1386.
