= William Martyn (historian) =

English lawyer and historian

- Born: 1562
- Died: 7 April 1617 (aged 54–55); Exeter, England
- Education: Broadgates Hall, Oxford
- Spouse(s): Susan Prestwood (m. 1585) Jane Huishe
- Children: 4, including Nicholas

William Martyn (1562–1617) was an English lawyer and historian.

== Life ==
Baptised at St Petrock's Church, Exeter, 19 September 1562, he was the eldest son of Nicholas Martyn of Exeter, by his first wife, Mary, daughter of Lennard Yeo of Hatherleigh. Having been sent to Exeter grammar school, he matriculated at Broadgates Hall, Oxford, in the autumn of 1581.

Martyn was called to the bar at the Middle Temple in 1589, and from 1605 to 1617 held the office of recorder of Exeter. On 7 April 1617 he died at Exeter, and was buried in St. Petrock's Church on 12 April, with an inscription placed to his memory.

== Works ==
Martyn was the author of The Historie and Lives of the Kings of England from William the Conqveror vnto the end of the Raigne of Henrie the Eight, 1615, containing preliminary verses from his three sons and his son-in-law, and an appendix of "succession of dukes and earles" and other particulars. A second edition appeared in 1628, which was illustrated with portraits of the kings by Renold Elstrack. To the third edition in 1638 was added The Historie of King Ed. VI, Queene Mary, and Q. Elizabeth, by B. R., Mr of Arts, longer than all the rest of the lives put together. Thomas Fuller believed that James I took exception to some passages of this book.

Martyn also wrote Youth's Instruction, 1612 (2nd edit. 1613), for his son Nicholas, then a student at Oxford. Each impression contained verses by his son-in-law, and to the second was prefixed a set by his son William.

== Family ==
Martyn married at St. Petrock's, on 28 November 1585, Susan, daughter of Thomas Prestwood of Exeter, by whom he had three sons, Nicholas, William, and Edward, and one daughter, Susan, who married Peter Bevis of Exeter. She was buried at All Hallows, Goldsmith Street, Exeter, on 30 January 1605–6. Martyn married for his second wife Jane, daughter of Henry Huishe of Sands in Sidbury, Devon. The eldest son Nicholas Martyn succeeded to his father's estate of Oxton in Kenton.

== Notes ==
Attribution

This article incorporates text from a publication now in the public domain: Lee, Sidney, ed. (1893). "Martyn, William". Dictionary of National Biography. Vol. 36. London: Smith, Elder & Co.
