= Guy Whittington =

Member of the Parliament of England

Guy Whittington (died 1440) was a Member of Parliament for the constituency of Gloucestershire for multiple parliaments from 1420 to 1432.
