= Renold Elstracke =

English engraver (1570–1625)

- Born: 1570
- Died: after 1625
- Other names: Reginold Elstrack
- Occupation: Engraver

Renold Elstracke, also Reginold Elstrack (1570 – after 1625), was one of the earliest native engravers in England.

== Biography ==
Renold (or Reginold) was born in 1570. He was the son of Josephe Elstrage of "Lukeland" (province of Liège, now part of Belgium), who came to England in 1551. He was in all probability a pupil of Crispin van de Passe the elder at Cologne, and came to England at the same time and under the same circumstances as the younger members of the Van de Passe family.

A print of Charles I is ascribed to Elstracke, in which case he must have lived on into the reign of the latter king. It is not known when he died.: the latest known mention in the historical record is 1625.

== Works ==
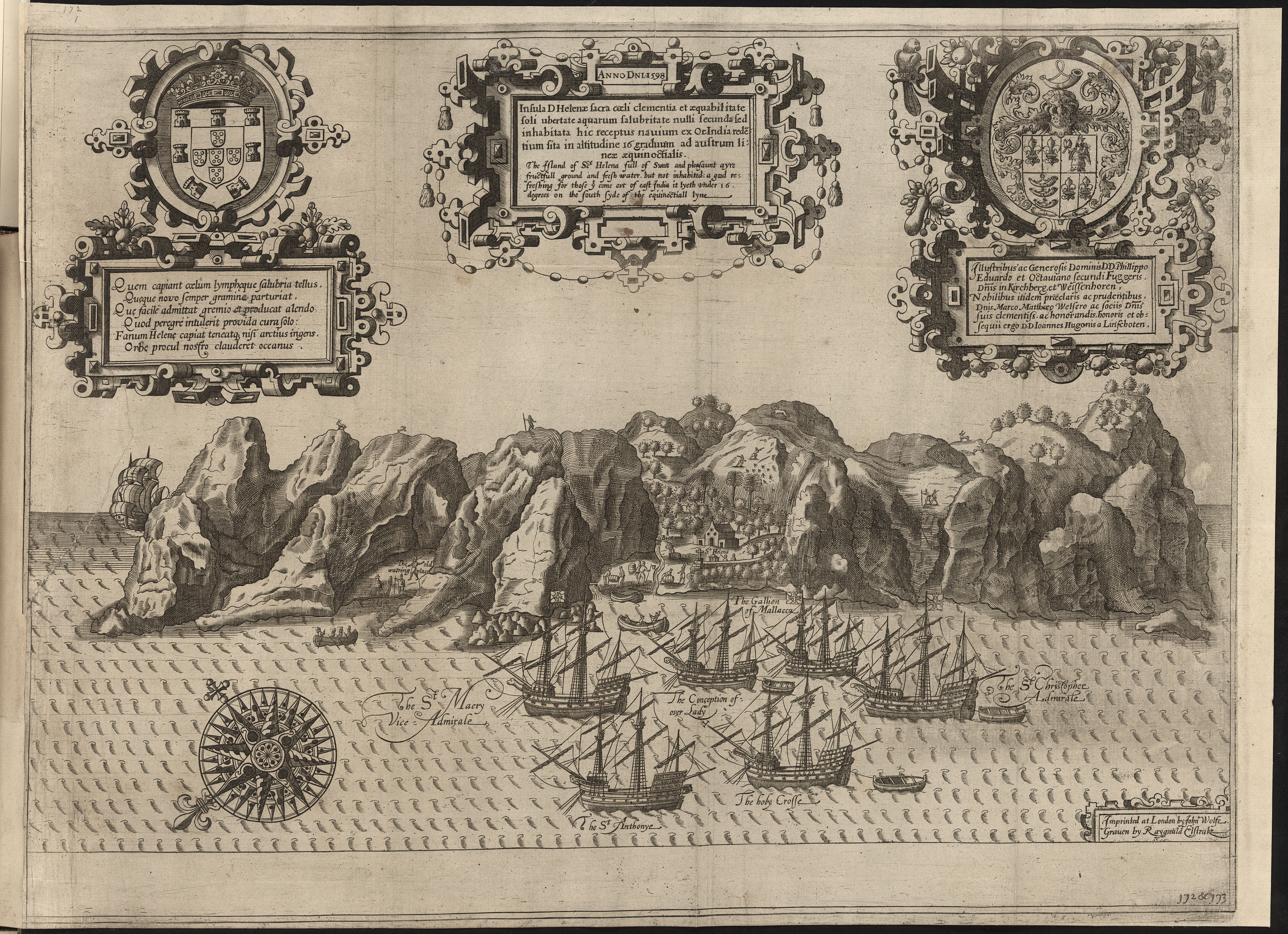
Portuguese ships anchored in the harbour of St Helena Island in May 1589 from Jan Huygen von Linschoten's Voyages into ye Easte and West Indies published in 1598

Elstracke's first known pieces come from a translation of Jan Huyghen van Linschoten's Voyages into ye Easte and West Indies published in 1598. William Rogers, his well-known predecessor, engraved the title-plate while Elstrack engraved five of the maps used in the work.

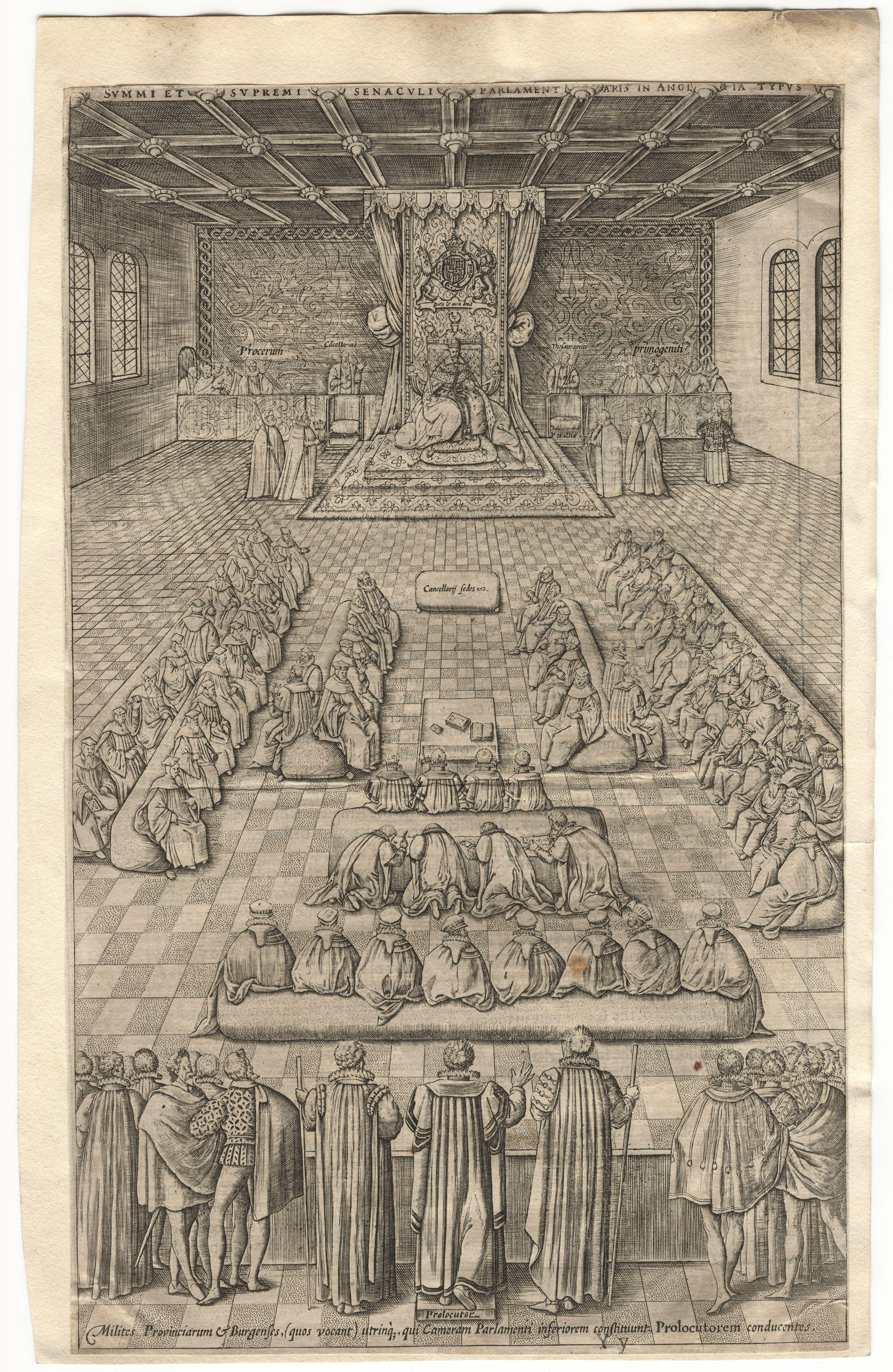
King James I of England and VI of Scotland in Parliament by Renold Elstrack.

Elstracke's major production was the set of engravings of the kings of England, published in 1618 by Henry Holland and sold by Compton Holland under the title of Baziliωlogia; a Booke of Kings, beeing the true and liuely Effigies of all our English kings from the Conquest vntill this present, with their seuerall coats of Armes, Impreses, and Devises: And a briefe Chronologie of their liues and deaths, elegantly grauen in Copper. This set consists of thirty-two portraits and a title-page containing portraits of James I and Anne of Denmark. "By this time, however, his work was rapidly becoming outdated, as the recently arrived Simon de Passe and Francis Delaram had introduced new patterns and styles from abroad (Griffiths 2004)."

The title-page, with different portraits, was used for the Earl of Monmouth's translation of Biondi's History of the Civil Wars.

The plates were subsequently used for Florus Anglicus, or Lives of the Kings of England, and again for William Martyn's Historie and Lives of the Kings of England. In both these cases they have letterpress at the back, and are in a very much worn condition.

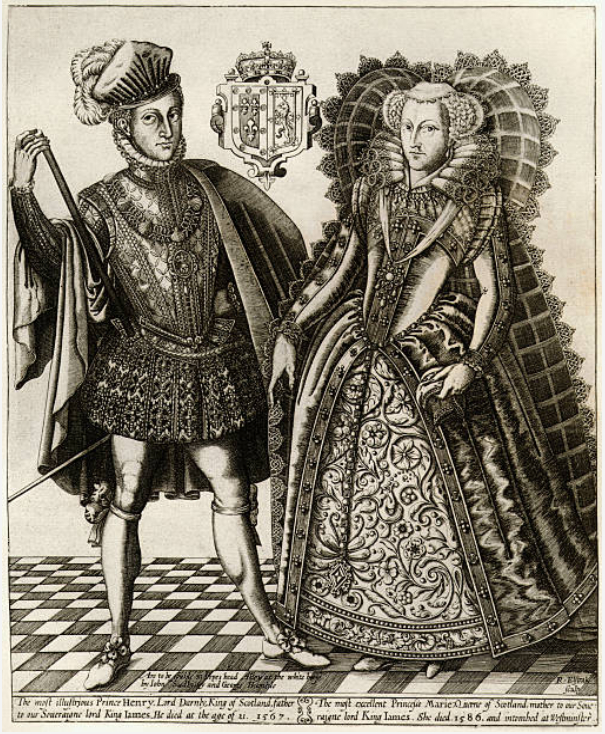
Mary Queen of Scots with her husband Henry Stuart Lord Darnley, engraved by Elstracke in 1603

One of the rarest of Elstracke's engravings, and the most highly prized by collectors during the 19th century, is the double whole-length portrait of Mary Queen of Scots and Henry, Lord Darnley; an impression of this was sold in 1824 in the collection of Sir Mark Sykes for £81 18/-.; the same print was sold at the dispersal of the Stowe Granger... in 1849 (when a great number of Elstracke's engravings were disposed of) for £33'. 10/-., and in March 1884, at the sale of the Dent collection, was purchased for the British Museum at a cost of £150.

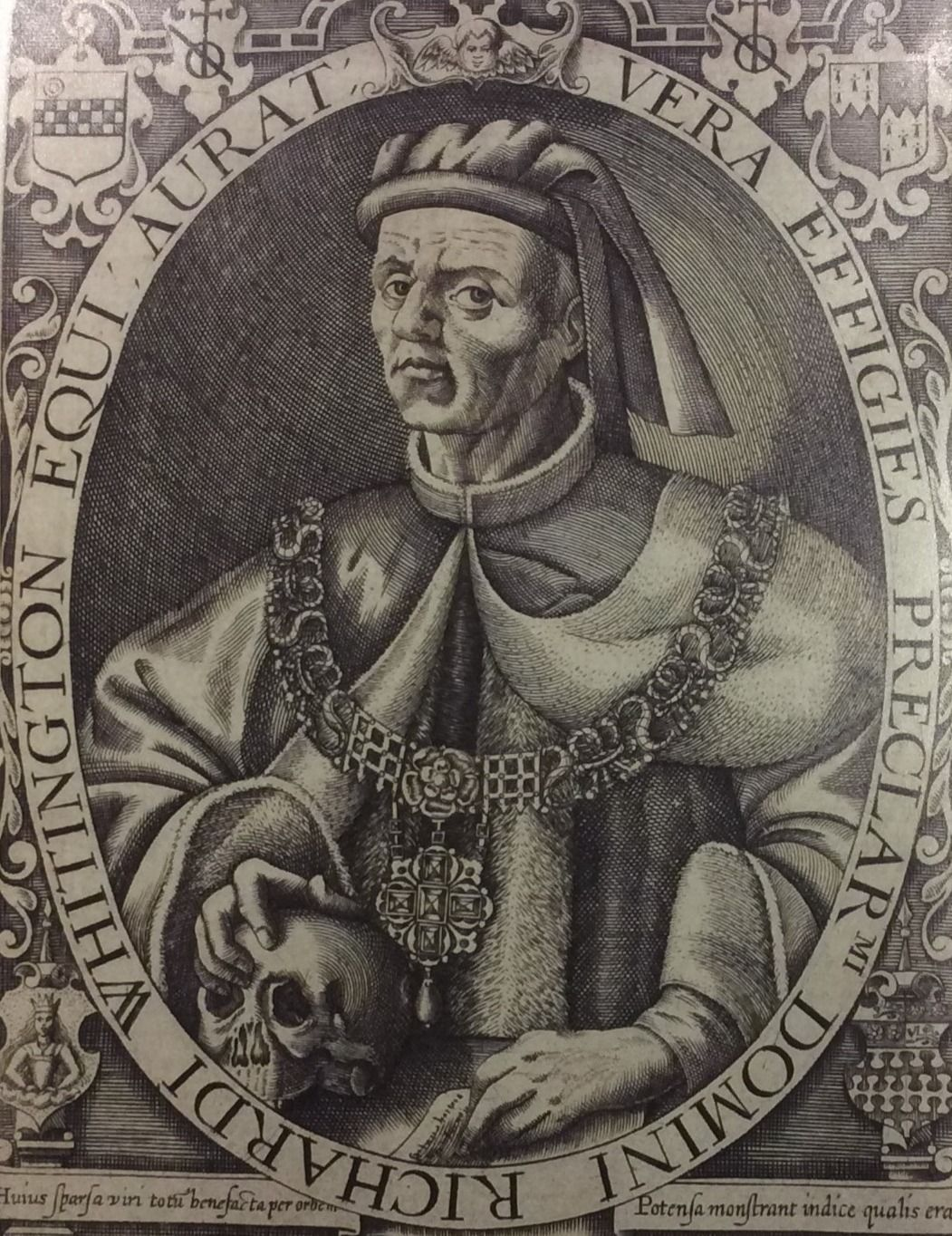
Richard Whittington with Skull, by Renold Elstracke

Among other rare engravings by Elstracke were similar portraits of Frederick V, Elector Palatine, and Princess Elizabeth (Dent sale, £23.), and James I of England and Anne of Denmark (Dent sale, £65) A portrait of Sir Richard Whittington was first engraved by Elstracke with the hand resting on a skull, which was subsequently altered to a cat; in its original state it is extremely rare.

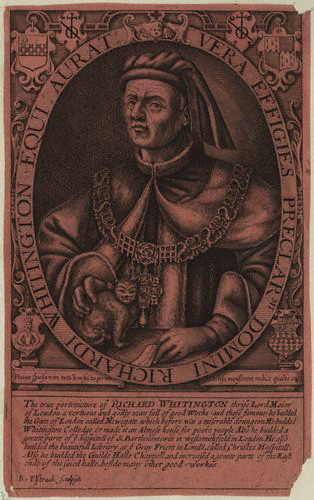
Later Whittington with cat

Among other notabilities whose portraits were engraved by Elstracke were:

- Gervase Babington, bishop of Worcester,
- Sir Julius Cæsar,
- Sir Thomas More,
- Thomas Sutton, founder of the Charterhouse School,
- Thomas Howard, 1st Earl of Suffolk,
- John, lord Harington of Exton,
- Robert Devereux, Earl of Essex,
- Robert Carr, 1st Earl of Somerset, and his wife,
- Sir Thomas Overbury,
- Matthew Hutton, archbishop of York,
- Tobias Matthew, archbishop of York, and others.

Elstracke also engraved numerous frontispieces. A print of James I sitting in parliament is dated 1624, and there is a similar print of Charles I ascribed to Elstracke.
