= Nicholas Arnold (lord justice) =

English courtier and politician (1507–1580)

Sir Nicholas Arnold (1507–1580) was an English courtier and politician, who held office as lord justice of Ireland.

== Life ==
Nicholas Arnold was born at Churcham in Gloucestershire, the eldest surviving son of John Arnold and his wife Isabel Hawkins. His father was lord of the manors of Highnam and Over in Gloucestershire. In 1526, he entered the service of Thomas Cromwell, where he assisted Cromwell in the Dissolution of the Monasteries. By 1526, he was a gentleman pensioner of Henry VIII, and in 1538 he became one of the King's Bodyguard.

=== Soldier and politician ===
In 1546, he was sent to take charge of the English fort of Boulogneberg near Boulogne in France. In May 1549 the fort was attacked by the French but they were completely defeated; Arnold himself was wounded in the attack. After a second attack the following August, Arnold realised defence was hopeless and, dismantling the fort, withdrew to Boulogne. He was knighted during the reign of Edward VI and spent time travelling in Italy.

He was the Member of Parliament for Gloucestershire in 1545–47, 1553 and 1555. He was later MP for Gloucester in the Parliaments of 1559 and 1563 to 1567 and in 1571 MP for Cricklade. From 1558 to 1580, he was also the Custos Rotulorum of Gloucestershire, and, in 1558 and 1559, the High Sheriff of Gloucestershire. He was appointed one of the Council of the Marches of Wales in June 1574.

=== Lord justice of Ireland ===
He was Lord Justice, 1564–65. He had already seen service in Ireland as member of a commission of inquiry into the conduct of the previous viceroy, Thomas Radcliffe, 3rd Earl of Sussex, which dragged on for two years but ended inconclusively. Arnold was appointed lord justice on 24 May 1564. Arnold concentrated on the defence of the Pale. He did not prevent the feud between the Desmonds and the Ormonds that led to the Battle of Affane early in 1565. As Lord Justice, he was regarded as a failure, being described as "quarrelsome, arbitrary and credulous", and within a year he was replaced by Sir Henry Sidney. The most serious charge against him was that he had done nothing to curb the growing power of Shane O'Neill, Prince of Ulster, thus making inevitable the clash between O'Neill and the Crown which broke out after his departure. He unwisely quarrelled with the youthful, but increasingly powerful, Adam Loftus, then Archbishop of Armagh, and shortly to be Archbishop of Dublin; and the favour he showed towards Gerald FitzGerald, 11th Earl of Kildare aroused resentment among the other members of the Anglo-Irish nobility.

On his return, a vengeful Earl of Sussex brought articles of impeachment against him, but these were ignored; in later years his interest in politics was mainly local. From 1572 he again served until his death as MP for Gloucestershire. He died in 1580, and was buried at Churcham.

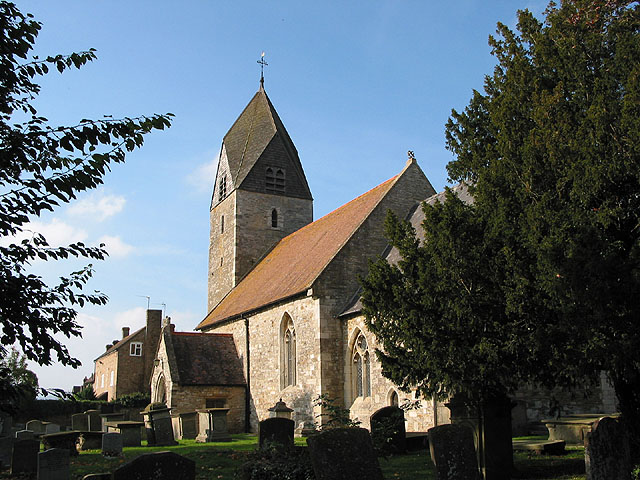
St. Andrew's, Churcham

== Character and religion ==
He was an exceptionally devout Protestant and, although he outwardly welcomed the accession of the Catholic Queen Mary I, was suspected of involvement with Wyatt's Rebellion. He was twice committed to the Tower of London, but nothing could be proved against him, and for the last two years of Mary's reign he was allowed to live on his estates. The informer William Thomas claimed that he had discussed Mary's assassination with Arnold, but at Wyatt's trial the Crown accepted that the conspirators has aimed only at preventing the Queen's marriage to Philip II of Spain, and had not planned to kill her.

In personality he was described as a "hard, iron, pitiless man", but resolute and hard-working. Most of his leisure time was dedicated to horse breeding, and he was credited with doing much to improve English bloodstock.

== Marriages ==
He married twice:

- Firstly, Margaret Denys, daughter of Sir William Denys (1470–1533) of Dyrham, Gloucestershire.
- Secondly, Margaret Isham, daughter and co-heir of John Isham of Bryanstown and widow of Nicholas Hore of Harpersdown, Wexford.

He had two sons and a daughter by his first marriage and one son by his second. His granddaughter Dorothy, daughter of his eldest son Rowland, was the first wife of Thomas Lucy, son of the courtier Sir Thomas Lucy, famous for his clashes with the young William Shakespeare.

== Notes, citations, and sources ==
=== Sources ===
- Lyall, Andrew (2004). "Arnold, Sir Nicholas". In Matthew, Henry Colin Gray; Harrison, Brian (eds.). Oxford Dictionary of National Biography. Vol. 2. New York: Oxford University Press. pp. 494–496. ISBN 0-19-861354-7.
- Pollard, Albert Frederick (1901). "Arnold, Sir Nicholas (1507? – 1580)". In Lee, Sidney (ed.). Dictionary of National Biography Supplement. Vol. I. New York: MacMillan and Co. pp. 75–76. OCLC 9146854.
