= Matthew Colthurst =

16th-century English politician

Matthew Colthurst (by 1517 – 8 July 1559), of Wardour Castle, Wiltshire and Claverton, Somerset, was an English politician during the reigns of Henry VIII and Edward VI.

== Early life ==
Matthew was the son of Henry Colthurst of Edisford, near Clitheroe, Lancashire. It is thought that he was educated at the Middle Temple and that his first wife was Anne Grimston of Suffolk, daughter of Thomas Grimston. His second wife was Anne Sibell of Farningham, Kent, a daughter of Nicholas Sibell. He had five sons and three daughters with his second wife.

== Career ==
Matthew Colthurst may have been trained at an Inn of Court, perhaps the Middle Temple, and is first mentioned in July 1538 when he acquired the lease of the tithes of Tywardreath rectory, Cornwall. A year later, he was working for Edward Seymore as an auditor in the Court of Augmentations with responsibility for valuing Henry VIII's newly acquired monastic properties in the West Country. This afforded him with considerable opportunity for enrichment, and in 1543 Colthurst purchased Bath Priory from a land agent named Humphrey Colles. Colthurst also worked for Thomas Seymore and in 1544, he was made treasurer of the ordnance at Boulogne. The following year he became Member (MP) of the Parliament of England for Bath. In about 1546 Colthurst purchased Hinton Priory from John Bartlett, and acquired Taunton Priory in 1550, which he subsequently sold to Thomas More. He became MP for Bletchingley in October 1553 and for MP for Wilton in April 1554. In 1559, Colthurst was appointed to the Court of First Fruits and Tenths, but died later that year.

== Death ==
He died on 8 July 1559. He was succeeded by his son Edmund. His widow, Anne Colthurst, afterwards married Laurence Hyde, one of the executors of Colthurst's will. She thereby became grandmother to Edward Hyde, 1st Earl of Clarendon, and great-great-grandmother to Queen Mary II and Queen Anne.

Parliament of England
| Preceded by ? ? | Member of Parliament for Bath; 1545; With: Silvester Sedborough | Succeeded by Richard Denys; John Clerke |
| Preceded by Sir John Cheke; Sir Maurice Berkeley | Member of Parliament for Bletchingley; 1553; With: Henry Polsted | Succeeded by John Harman; Nicholas Saunders |
| Preceded by Nicholas Chowne; Henry Creed | Member of Parliament for Wilton; 1554; With: William Clerke | Succeeded by William Clerke; Henry Creed |
