= Thomas Butler (MP for Gloucestershire) =

14th-century English politician

Sir Thomas Butler (c. 1358–1398) was the member of Parliament for the constituency of Gloucestershire for the parliament of January 1397.
