= Robert Greyndore =

Member of the Parliament of England

Robert Greyndore (died 1443) was the member of Parliament for the constituency of Gloucestershire for the parliaments of 1417, 1420, 1426, and 1433.
