= Richard Denys =

16th-century English politician

Richard Denys (c. 1525 – 1593/94), of Cold Ashton, Gloucestershire, was an English politician.

== Family ==
Denys was the eldest son of Sir Walter Denys by his first wife and nephew of Sir Maurice Denys. Denys married, by 1557, Anne St John, a daughter of the MP Sir John St. John of Bletsoe, Bedfordshire. They had a large family. His son and heir Walter and 5 daughters married members of the local Gloucestershire gentry.

== Career ==
He was a Member (MP) of the Parliament of England for Bath in 1547. He may already have already held a post under the dean and chapter, his father having acquired the advowson of the church before the dissolution of the monasteries and some of the materials from the buildings afterwards. His uncle, Maurice Denys and his brothers-in-law, Oliver St. John and Francis Russell were also members of the same parliament.

His family's fortunes waned during the reign of Mary, but showed signs of recovery with the accession of Elizabeth I, when he became a justice of the peace in Gloucestershire. He was elected as MP for Gloucestershire in 1563. In that year his uncle died and his father inherited both his property and his debts. Subsequently a substantial portion of Richard's inheritance was sold, and he inherited a much reduced estate on his father's death in 1571. By 1574 he was involved in a dispute over Siston, where it was claimed he had mortgaged and separately sold the same property.

The last years of his life are obscure. He described himself as 'of Gloucester' in his will, and may have been living with his daughter Anne at Llanthony Secunda Priory.

Parliament of England
| Preceded by Matthew Colthurst; Silvester Sedborough | Member of Parliament for Bath; 1547; With: John Clerke | Succeeded by ? ? |
Parliament of England
| Preceded by ? ? | Member of Parliament for Gloucestershire; 1563; With: Nicholas Walshe | Succeeded by Giles Poole; Nicholas Poyntz |
