= James Clifford (MP) =

Member of the Parliament of England

Personal details
- Occupation: politician

James Clifford was the member of Parliament for the constituency of Gloucestershire for the parliament of October 1404.
