= Nether Exe =

Village in Devon, England

Coordinates: 50.790°N 3.512°W

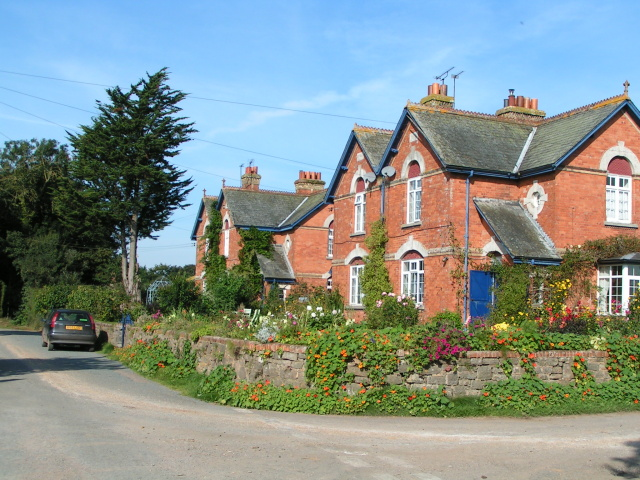
- Houses at Nether Exe

- Location within Devon
- Population: 47 (2001 Census)
- OS grid reference: SS935000
- Civil parish: Nether Exe
- District: East Devon
- Shire county: Devon
- Region: South West
- Country: England
- Sovereign state: United Kingdom
- Post town: EXETER
- Postcode district: EX5
- Dialling code: 01392
- Police: Devon and Cornwall
- Fire: Devon and Somerset
- Ambulance: South Western
- UK Parliament: Exmouth and Exeter East

Nether Exe or Netherexe is a very small village and civil parish in Devon, England. It lies near the River Exe, as its name suggests, about 5 miles (8 km) north of Exeter.

The Church of St John the Baptist is a small stone church set amidst fields close to the river south-west of the present day village, though there was once a manor house nearby. The church is a Grade I listed building built in the late 15th century. Services are still held in the church, if infrequently.

The hamlet of Netherexe gives its name to the "Netherexe Parishes", a group of 8 Anglican parishes with 11 churches under the pastoral care of a single vicar; though the smallest of them all, Netherexe is almost at the geographical centre of the group.

Richard de Lucy, of Devon, held part of Netherexe, Hayridge Hundred, Devon in 1301.
