= Robert Poyntz (MP died 1439) =

Member of the Parliament of England

Robert Poyntz (c. 1359–1439) was the member of Parliament for the constituency of Gloucestershire for the parliaments of 1415 and 1417.
