= William Tracy (14th-century MP) =

English Member of Parliament (fl.1313–1322)

Sir William Tracy (fl. 1313–1322) was an English Member of Parliament.

He was M.P. for Gloucestershire in 1313 and 1322.
