= Walter Denys =

16th-century English politician

Sir Walter Denys (c. 1501–1571) of Dyrham, Gloucestershire was a Tudor landowner and member of Parliament.

== Background ==
Denys was the son of Sir William Denys of Dyrham and Anne, daughter of Maurice Berkeley, 3rd Baron Berkeley. Maurice Denys was his younger brother. In 1533 inherited a considerable estate in Gloucestershire from his father.

== Career ==
He was High Sheriff of Gloucestershire from June to November 1533, then in 1538–9, 1543–4, 1551-2 and 1555–6. He was a justice of the peace in Gloucestershire from 1535 and knighted at around the same time. He was steward and receiver of St Augustine's abbey, Bristol from 1542. In 1553 he purchased the manor of Horsley, Gloucestershire, which he conveyed to his son Richard.

He was temporarily removed from the bench under Mary I. The change of regime caused both Sir Walter and his younger brother financial difficulties.

He sat for Gloucestershire in the Parliament of 1558 and Cricklade in 1559. In 1563 he inherited Sutton Place in Sutton-at-Hone, Kent from his brother Maurice, which he and his son sold the following year. He also acquired from Maurice the ancestral manor of Siston and Abson, Gloucestershire.

== Family ==
By 1522 he was married to Margaret, the daughter of Sir Richard Weston of Sutton Place, Surrey. His heir was Richard Denys, who also served as an MP. Another son Walter (d. 1577) became rector of Dyrham in 1571.

At the time of his death he was living at St Augustine's Green in Bristol and married to a woman called Alice.
