= William Tracy (MP, died 1440) =

English Member of Parliament (died 1440)

William Tracy (died 1440) was the member of Parliament for the constituency of Gloucestershire for the parliament of 1419.
