= Nicholas de Sancto Mauro =

Nicholas de Sancto Mauro or Nicholas Seymour was a member of the Seymour family (died between 1315 and 1318) and a Member of Parliament for Gloucestershire in March 1313.
