= John Lucy (MP) =

Member of the Parliament of England

John Lucy (fl. 1372) was an English Member of Parliament.

He was a Member (MP) of the Parliament of England for Gloucestershire in 1372.

Parliament of England
Preceded by one member only John Pointz	Member of Parliament for Gloucestershire; 1372	Succeeded by John Giffard; Thomas Hathewy
