= Giles Poole =

English landowner and politician

Sir Giles Poole (died 1589) was an English landowner and politician.

He was the eldest son of Leonard Poole (d. 1538) of Sapperton by Catherine, the daughter of Sir Giles Brydges of Coberley. Henry Poole was his younger brother. He married Elizabeth (d. 1543), one of the 6 daughters and co-heiresses of Thomas Whittington of Pauntley with whom he had a son Henry. Through the influence of his wife's family he was appointed a gentleman pensioner in 1540. He served with the army in France during 1544 and in the north between 1547 and 1548. He was knighted in 1547 and from that year was a JP in Gloucestershire. He served as sheriff in 1565/6 and held various other local posts.

He sat for Gloucestershire in Mary I's second parliament and was appointed provost marshal for Ireland in 1558, suggesting he supported the restoration of Catholicism. In Elizabeth's reign he sat in parliament for Gloucestershire in 1559 and 1571. He married Eleanor, daughter of Edward Lewknor of Kingston by Sea, Sussex and widow of Sir William Wroughton (d. 1559) of Broad Hinton, Wilts. as his second wife, while his son Henry married Eleanor's step-daughter Anne. His will refers to the funeral monument he had erected at Sapperton, making it likely that he is represented by the effigy on the tomb dated 1574 there.
