= Pauntley =

Coordinates: 51.9599°N 2.4196°W

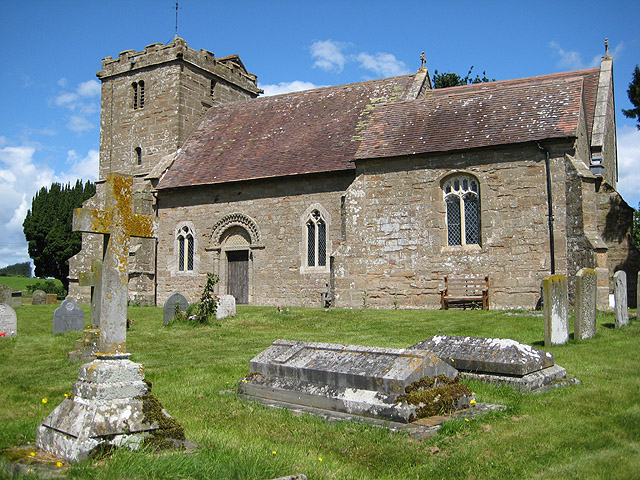
- Church of St John the Evangelist

- Location within Gloucestershire
- Population: 304 (2019)
- Civil parish: Pauntley
- Shire county: Gloucestershire
- Region: South West
- Country: England
- Sovereign state: United Kingdom
- Post town: Newent
- Postcode district: GL19
- Police: Gloucestershire
- Fire: Gloucestershire
- Ambulance: South Western

Pauntley is a village and civil parish in the district of Forest of Dean, Gloucestershire, England. In 2019 it had a population of 304.

== School ==
Pauntley Church of England Primary School is located at the top of Poolhill.

== History ==
The name "Pauntley" means 'Valley wood/clearing'. Pauntley was recorded in the Domesday Book as Pantelie.

== Notable people ==
- Dick Whittington (c. 1354–1423), also known as Richard Whittington and who later became Lord Mayor of the City of London, was born in Pauntley, now part of the Forest of Dean district.
