= St Martin Vintry =

Former church-site in London

Coordinates: 51.5109°N 0.0928°W

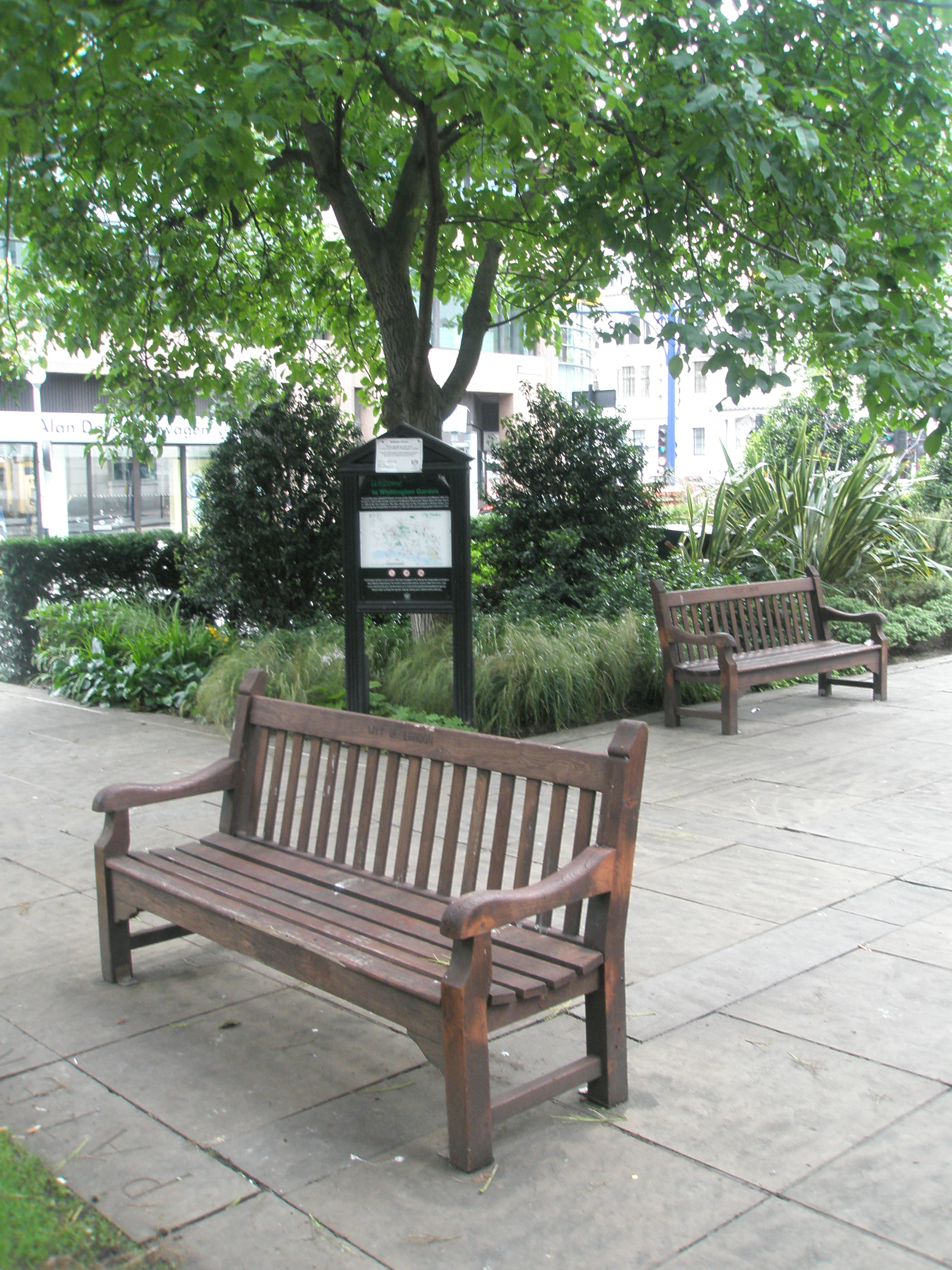
- Current photo of site
- St Martin Vintry
- Denomination: Anglican

Architecture
- Demolished: 1666

St Martin Vintry was a parish church in the Vintry ward of the City of London, England. It was destroyed in the Great Fire of London in 1666 and never rebuilt.

== History ==
The church stood at what is now the junction of Queen Street and Upper Thames Street, just north of Southwark Bridge. It was rebuilt in 1306, the choir at the cost of Queen Margaret. The Vintners' Company had an altar in the church dedicated to St Martin, who was their patron saint.

St Martin Vintry was one of 86 parish churches destroyed in the Great Fire of London. In 1670, a Rebuilding Act was passed and a committee set up under the stewardship of Sir Christopher Wren to decide which would be rebuilt. Fifty-one were chosen, but St Martin Vintry was not among them. Instead its parish was united with that of St Michael Paternoster Royal.
