= Poyntz =

Poyntz may refer to:

== People ==
- Billy Poyntz (1894–1966), Welsh footballer
- Hugh Poyntz (1877–1955), English soldier and cricketer
- Juliet Stuart Poyntz (1886–1937), American suffragist, feminist, trade unionist and communist
- Massey Poyntz (1883–1934), English cricketer
- Sir Nicholas Poyntz (1510–1556), English courtier
  - Sir Nicholas Poyntz (MP died 1585) son of above
    - Sir Nicholas Poyntz (died 1633) son of above
      - Sir Robert Pointz or Poyntz (1588–1665)
- Sarah Poyntz (1926–2020), Irish journalist and author
- Sydnam Poyntz, 17th-century English soldier
- William Stephen Poyntz (1770–1840), English politician
- William Poyntz (high sheriff), 18th-century English High Sheriff of Berkshire
- Poyntz Tyler (1906–1971), American writer

The name of Poyntz occurred in medieval England, see Feudal barony of Curry Mallet and Manor of Iron Acton, and also in Ireland.

== Places ==
- Poyntzpass, a village in County Armagh, Northern Ireland
- Sutton Poyntz (liberty), a liberty in the county of Dorset, England

== See also ==
- Pointz, a surname variant
