= Robert Chamberlain (poet) =

English poet & playwright (1607–1666)

Robert Chamberlain (1607–1666) was an English poet and playwright.

== Life ==
Chamberlain was born to Robert Chamberlain of Standish, Lancashire, and was clerk to Peter Ball, the solicitor-general to Queen Henrietta Maria of France. Ball, apparently impressed with Chamberlain's literary promise, sent him to study at Exeter College in 1637, when he was thirty years old. At Oxford Chamberlain was popular with the university wits, and issued several volumes while in residence. He never took a degree. The date of his death is not known. He was a close friend of Thomas Rawlins and Thomas Nabbes, and was much attached to Peter Ball and his son William.

== Works ==
Chamberlain's literary work consists of original adages, a comedy, some short poems, and collections of ancient jokes. He contributed commendatory verses to: Nabbes's Spring's Glory, 1638; Rawlins's tragedy The Rebellion, 1640; John Tatham's Fancies Theatre, 1640. He was erroneously credited by Anthony Wood and others with the authorship of Sicelides, a Pastoral, 1633. by Phineas Fletcher.

Leonard Blunt's Asse upon Asse (1661) also has a commendatory verse by Chamberlain. It was "a collection of several pamphlets written for and against the author of the Asses' Complaint against Balaam", viz. Lewis Griffin. Scholars now take one of the works in the volume, Balaam's Asse Cudgeld, to be by Chamberlain. These writings are the last known of his.
