= Pointz =

Pointz is a surname. Notable people with the surname include:

- Robert Pointz (1588–1665), English landowner and politician
- John Pointz (died 1633), English landowner and politician

== See also ==
- Point (surname)
- Poyntz (disambiguation)
