= Richard Berkeley =

Richard Berkeley may refer to:

- Richard Berkeley (died 1604) (1531–1604), Member of Parliament for Gloucestershire, 1604
- Richard Berkeley (died 1661) (1579–1661), Member of Parliament for Gloucestershire, 1614
- Richard Berkeley (Sussex MP) (by 1465–1513 or later), MP for Winchelsea and Rye

== See also ==
- Richard L. Berkley (1931–2023), American politician, mayor of Kansas City, Missouri
