= Peter Ball =

Peter Ball may refer to:

- Peter Ball (bishop) (1932–2019), former Bishop of Lewes and of Gloucester and convicted sex offender
- Peter Ball (physician) (died 1675), English physician
- Peter Eugene Ball (born 1943), English sculptor
- Peter Ball (barrister) (died 1680), English lawyer, courtier, and member of parliament
- Peter William Ball (born 1932), English-born botanist, plant collector, and plant taxonomist
