= Thomas Estcourt (died 1624) =

English lawyer and politician

Sir Thomas Estcourt (c. 1570 – 4 July 1624) was an English lawyer and politician who sat in the House of Commons in 1624.

Estcourt was the son of Thomas Estcourt of Gray's Inn and his wife Hannah Ascough. He matriculated at Magdalen College, Oxford, on 29 April 1586, aged 16 and was called to the bar at Gray's Inn in 1593. He became an Ancient of Gray's Inn on 11 February 1604. In 1607, he was High Sheriff of Gloucestershire and was knighted on 6 November 1607.

In 1597, he was elected Member of Parliament for Malmesbury. In 1624 he was re-elected for Gloucestershire but died later in the year.

Estcourt married Mary Savage, daughter of William Savage of Elmley Castle, Worcestershire.

Parliament of England
Preceded by Sir Robert Tracy; Maurice Berkeley	Member of Parliament for Gloucestershire; 1624; With: John Dutton	Succeeded by John Dutton; Maurice Berkeley
