= John Hungerford (died 1635) =

English politician

John Hungerford (c 1566 – 18 March 1635) was an English politician who sat in the House of Commons at various times between 1597 and 1611.

Hungerford was the son of Anthony Hungerford of Downe Ampney, Wiltshire and his wife Bridget Shelley, daughter of John Shelley. He matriculated at St John's College, Oxford on 12 April 1583, aged 17.

He was a J.P. for Gloucestershire and Wiltshire from 1588 and was knighted in 1591. For 1592–93 he was High Sheriff of Wiltshire and for 1597–98 High Sheriff of Gloucestershire. He was awarded MA on 9 July 1594. In 1597, Hungerford was elected Member of Parliament for Gloucestershire. He took an interest in Cricklade and in 1601 built the market house in the High Street, and a flying buttress for the Lady Chapel of St Sampson’s Church. He was elected MP for Cricklade in 1604. He was a Gentleman of the Privy Chamber to King James I and was Deputy Lieutenant for Gloucestershire in 1628.

Hungerford died in 1635 "honourable in his life, serviceable to his King and country, liberal to his friends, charitable to the poor and courteous to all".

Hungerford married firstly Mary Berkeley daughter of Sir Richard Berkeley and secondly Anna Goddard daughter of Edward Goddard. He was the brother of Anthony Hungerford of Black Bourton.

Parliament of England
Preceded by Sir Henry Poole; Sir John Pointz	Member of Parliament for Gloucestershire; 1597; With: Sir John Tracy	Succeeded by Sir Edward Wynter; John Throckmorton
Preceded by Sir George Gifford; Robert Master	Member of Parliament for Cricklade; 1604–1611; With: Sir Henry Poole	Succeeded by Sir Thomas Monson, 1st Baronet; Sir John Eyre
