= John Throckmorton (of Lypiatt) =

English politician, (1572–1623)

John Throckmorton (1572–1623) was an English politician who sat in the House of Commons at various times between 1601 and 1611.

Throckmorton's parentage is unknown. He should not be confused with John Throckmorton of Tortworth who died c.1591 as a boy, the grandson of Richard Berkeley (d.1604) of Stoke Gifford.

He matriculated at University College, Oxford on 9 December 1586, aged 14. He was of Lypiatt, Gloucestershire. In 1601, he was elected Member of Parliament for Gloucestershire. He was re-elected MP for Gloucestershire at a by-election in 1604, caused by the death of Sir Richard Berkeley, whom he replaced as MP. It is not known what relationship, if any, he may have had to Sir Richard Berkeley; perhaps he was a member of the family of Throckmorton of Coughton Court, who were distant cousins of the Throckmortons of Tortworth.

Throckmorton died without issue before 1623.

Parliament of England
Preceded by Sir John Tracy; Sir John Hungerford	Member of Parliament for Gloucestershire; 1601; With: Sir Edward Wynter	Succeeded by Sir Thomas Berkeley; Sir Richard Berkeley
Preceded by Sir Thomas Berkeley; Sir Richard Berkeley	Member of Parliament for Gloucestershire; 1604–1611; With: Sir Thomas Berkeley	Succeeded by Sir William Cooke; Richard Berkeley
