= Robert Tracy, 2nd Viscount Tracy =

English politician and peer (c.1593–1662)

Sir Robert Tracy, 2nd Viscount Tracy (c. 1593–1662) was an English politician who sat in the House of Commons of England variously between 1620 and 1640. He fought for the Royalists in the English Civil War.

Tracy was the son of Sir John Tracy of Toddington and his wife Anne Shirley daughter of Sir Thomas Shirley of Wiston Sussex. He matriculated at Queen's College, Oxford and was admitted to Middle Temple in 1610. He was knighted by King James I at Theobalds on 2 October 1616.

In 1620, Tracy was elected member of parliament for Gloucestershire and held the seat until 1622. He was re-elected MP for Gloucestershire in 1626. In April 1640, he was re-elected MP for Gloucestershire in the Short Parliament.

In the Civil War, Tracy was a Commissioner for King Charles I and fought against the Parliamentary forces at Cirencester and the Siege of Gloucester in 1643. He surrendered to Colonel Massey in 1645 and was compounded for delinquency in 1647. He was assessed to pay a fine, beginning at £4000, reduced to £2000, then £1,500 and finally £360. He inherited the title on the death of his father around 1648. He took the oath of fidelity to the Government in 1650 and was discharged under the Act of Pardon 1652.

Tracy died aged around 69 and was buried at Toddington on 2 May 1662.

Tracy married firstly in 1617 Bridget Lyttelton, daughter of John Lyttelton, of Frankley Court, Worcestershire and his wife Meriel Bromley, daughter of Sir Thomas Bromley, Lord Chancellor. They had eight children including his successor John Tracy. He married as his second wife Dorothy Cocks, daughter of Thomas Cocks, of Castleditch, Herefordshire and his wife Anne Elton, daughter of Ambrose Elton, of Ledbury, and had further issue, including the senior judge Robert Tracy.

Parliament of England
Preceded by Sir William Cooke; Richard Berkeley	Member of Parliament for Gloucestershire; 1620–1622; With: Maurice Berkeley	Succeeded by Sir Thomas Estcourt; John Dutton
Preceded by Maurice Berkeley; John Dutton	Member of Parliament for Gloucestershire; 1626; With: Sir Robert Pointz	Succeeded by Sir Robert Pointz; Nathaniel Stephens
Vacant Parliament suspended since 1629	Member of Parliament for Gloucestershire; 1640; With: Sir Robert Cooke	Succeeded by John Dutton; Nathaniel Stephens
Peerage of Ireland
Preceded by John Tracy	Viscount Tracy; 1648–1662	Succeeded by John Tracy
