= Thomas Berkeley (1575–1611) =

English politician (1575–1611)

Sir Thomas Berkeley
- Born: 11 July 1575
- Died: 22 November 1611 (aged 36)
- Noble family: Berkeley
- Spouse: Elizabeth Carey
- Issue: George Berkeley, 8th Baron Berkeley
- Father: Henry Berkeley, 7th Baron Berkeley
- Mother: Katherine Howard

Sir Thomas Berkeley, KB (11 July 1575 – 22 November 1611) was the son and heir apparent of Henry Berkeley, 7th Baron Berkeley, and a Member of Parliament for Gloucestershire from 1604 until 1611.

== Family ==
Thomas Berkeley was the son of Henry Berkeley, 7th Baron Berkeley (d. 26 November 1613), by his first wife, Katherine Howard (d. 7 April 1596), third daughter of Henry Howard, Earl of Surrey, and Frances de Vere, daughter of John de Vere, 15th Earl of Oxford, and Elizabeth Trussell.

== Career ==
Berkeley matriculated at Magdalen College, Oxford, on 27 June 1590 at the age of 14. On 2 February 1589 he entered Gray's Inn. He was created a Knight of the Bath on 25 July 1603 at the coronation of King James I. In 1604 he was elected Member of Parliament for Gloucestershire.

Berkeley died on 22 November 1611 at the age of 37.

== Marriage and issue ==
Berkeley married Elizabeth Carey, daughter and sole heir of George Carey, 2nd Baron Hunsdon, and his wife, Elizabeth Spencer:

- Theophila, born at her maternal grandparents' house at Blackfriars, London, 11 December 1596. She married Robert, eldest surviving son of Edward Coke.
- George Berkeley, 8th Baron Berkeley, baptized 26 October 1601 at Low Leyton, Essex.

== Notes ==
Parliament of England
Preceded by Sir Edward Wynter; John Throckmorton	Member of Parliament for Gloucestershire; 1604–1611; With: Sir Richard Berkeley 1604; John Throckmorton	Succeeded by Sir William Cooke; Richard Berkeley
