= John Tracy, 1st Viscount Tracy =

English landowner, politician and peer (died c.1648)

John Tracy, 1st Viscount Tracy (born by 1581, died 1648) was an English landowner and politician who sat in the House of Commons from 1597.

Tracy was the son and heir of Sir John Tracy (died 1591), who was Sheriff of Gloucestershire in 1578, and his wife Anne (died 1581), a daughter of Sir Thomas Throckmorton of Tortworth.

He was admitted to the Inner Temple in November 1580, and granted special livery of his father's estates on 14 February 1592. In 1597, he was elected Member of Parliament for Gloucestershire.

He was probably knighted by James I on 23 July 1603. A younger brother, Thomas Tracy was an usher to Anne of Denmark. In 1609, John Tracy was Sheriff of Gloucestershire. He was created Viscount Tracy, of Rathcoole in the County of Dublin, a title in the Peerage of Ireland, on 12 January 1643, being then "72 years old or more". This did not give him a seat in the House of Lords.

Tracy died in or before 1648, when the administration of his estates was granted following his death.

== Marriage and family ==
Tracy married Anne Shirley, a daughter of Sir Thomas Shirley of Wiston, Sussex, in about 1590. Their children included:

- Robert Tracy, 2nd Viscount Tracy, who married (1) Bridget Lyttleton, and (2) Dorothy Cocks
- John Tracy of Stanhow, Norfolk, who married Elizabeth Allington, widow of Henry Palavicini (a son of Horatio Palavicino) and William Clopton

Parliament of England
| Preceded by Sir John Pointz; Sir Henry Poole | Member of Parliament for Gloucestershire; 1597; With: Sir John Hungerford | Succeeded by Sir Edward Wynter; John Throckmorton |
Peerage of Ireland
| New creation | Viscount Tracy; 1643–1648 | Succeeded by Robert Tracy |
