= Richard Stephens of Eastington =

16th-century English politician and lawyer

Richard Stephens (died 1599) of Eastington, Gloucestershire, was an English lawyer.

== Family ==
He was the eldest son of Edward Stephens (d. 1587) and his wife Joan (D. 1587), the daughter of Richard Fowler of Stonehouse. His father, then described as of Standish, acquired an estate at Chavenage between 1562 and 1564. His father subsequently inherited the manor of Eastington from his brother Richard Stephens (d. 1577). He married Margaret (d. 1591), daughter of Edward St. Loe. They had a son Nathaniel and two daughters, Abigail and Sarah. He subsequently married Anne Kirby (d. 1606), a widow, daughter and co-heir of John Stone of London.

== Career ==
Richard entered Corpus Christi College, Oxford in 1567 and became a fellow in 1569. He entered the Middle Temple from Furnival's Inn in February 1572. He was appointed a justice of the peace in Gloucestershire in 1592. The following year he was a Member of Parliament for the constituency of Newport Iuxta Launceston. He presumably owed his seat to his standing as a Middle Temple lawyer and possibly also connections at court, since he had no other known association with Cornwall. Following his support for Peter Wentworth's attempt to raise the question of the royal succession, he was imprisoned in the Fleet prison. He was presumably released at the end of the parliamentary term.

In religion he was a puritan. He died in 1599, when his son and heir Nathaniel was 10. His widow Anne held the manorhouse of Chavenage for the remainder of her life.
