= Edward Stephens (MP for Tewkesbury and Gloucestershire) =

English lawyer and politician

Sir Edward Stephens (1597 – c. 1670) of Little Sodbury, Gloucestershire was an English lawyer and politician who sat in the House of Commons variously between 1640 and 1660.

Stephens was the eldest son of Thomas Stephens of Over Lipiatt who was the Prince of Wales's attorney-general. He became a student of Middle Temple in 1612. He was the brother of John Stephens.

Stephens was appointed High Sheriff of Gloucestershire for 1634 and elected in November 1640 Member of Parliament for Tewkesbury in the Long Parliament. The election resulted in a double return and was declared void, but he was returned again in 1641. He sat until 1648 when he was excluded under Pride's Purge and imprisoned.

In April 1660, Stephens was elected MP for Gloucestershire in the Convention Parliament. He was knighted on 11 July 1660.

Stephens died in or around 1670 at Little Sodbury. He had married Anne Crewe, daughter of Sir Thomas Crewe of Stene, Northamptonshire and was succeeded by his son Thomas. His daughter Temperance married Robert Packer MP.

Parliament of England
Preceded by Robert Cooke; Sir Edward Alford	Member of Parliament for Tewkesbury; 1641–1648; With: Robert Cooke 1641–1643; John Stephens 1645–1648	Succeeded by John Stephens
