= John Seymour (Gloucestershire MP) =

Sir John Seymour was an English politician who sat in the House of Commons from 1646 to 1648.

He was the son of Sir Thomas Seymour (born 1569 to 1627) and Elizabeth Webb. He died in 1663 and was buried at the church of St Mary at Bitton, Gloucestershire, where there is a monument decorated with female supporters and weepers, alongside the monument of his grandfather (John Seymour (1530 - 1596).

Parliament of England
Preceded by Nathaniel Stephens; John Dutton	Member of Parliament for Gloucestershire; 1646–1648; With: Nathaniel Stephens	Succeeded by Nathaniel Stephens
