= Maurice Berkeley (1599–1654) =

English politician

Sir Maurice Berkeley (1599–1654) was an English politician who sat in the House of Commons at various times between 1621 and 1626. He supported the Royalist cause in the English Civil War.

== Life ==
Berkeley was the son of Richard Berkeley of Stoke Gifford and Rendcomb, who had represented Gloucestershire in the parliament of 1614.

In 1621, Berkeley was elected Member of Parliament for Gloucestershire. He was knighted on 11 September 1621 at Whitehall. He was re-elected MP for Gloucestershire at by-elections in 1624 and 1625 and was elected MP for Great Bedwyn in 1626.

Berkeley supported King Charles I in the Civil War, arguing later that he was forced to do so and to sign warrants for raising money because of his proximity to Bristol. On 26 January 1647, he begged to compound for delinquency and was set a fine of £1,030 on 25 March. He was assessed at £700 on 13 June 1649 and was given an order for his discharge on payment of £330 on 1 August 1649. He was given a similar order on payment of £60 on 5 December 1651 and was charged an additional fine on 30 January 1652 and given an order for his discharge on payment of £125.

Berkeley died in 1654 and was buried at Stoke Gifford on 3 January 1655.

== Family ==
In 1622 Berkeley married Elizabeth (d. 1623), daughter of Sir Edward Coke of Stoke Poges and Elizabeth Hatton. They had a daughter Frances, on whose behalf her father later petitioned Charles I complaining that Lady Purbeck and her husband had received a more generous marriage settlement than her sister.

By 1627 he had married Mary Tipping, daughter of Sir George Tipping of Wheatfield, Oxfordshire. By his second marriage he had two sons, Richard and George. He was succeeded by his son Richard (d. 1671).

Parliament of England
| Preceded by Sir William Cooke; Richard Berkeley | Member of Parliament for Gloucestershire; 1621–1622; With: Sir Robert Tracy | Succeeded by Sir Thomas Estcourt; John Dutton |
| Preceded by Sir Thomas Estcourt; John Dutton | Member of Parliament for Gloucestershire; 1624–1625; With: John Dutton | Succeeded by Sir Robert Tracy; Sir Robert Pointz |
| Preceded by Sir John Brooke; William Cholmley | Member of Parliament for Great Bedwyn; 1626; With: John Selden | Succeeded by Edward Kyrton; John Trevor |
