= Francis White (soldier) =

English soldier and politician

Francis White (died December 1657) was an English soldier and politician who sat in the House of Commons in 1656. He died at sea after serving in Flanders.

White was a major in the Lord General's Regiment of Foot and in May 1649 went on Cromwell's behalf to reason with mutinous soldiers at Burford Oxford. On 11 September 1650 the Council of State gave warrant to pay White £300 for bringing news of good success from Scotland. He was Lieutenant Colonel in Colonel Goffe's Regiment of Foot in 1653. On 15 August 1653 the Council allowed White to open a door from his house in King's street into an orchard in Whitehall. In 1655 he was one of the most active of officers forming a committee of ordnance.

In 1656, White was elected member of parliament for Tewkesbury in the Second Protectorate Parliament.

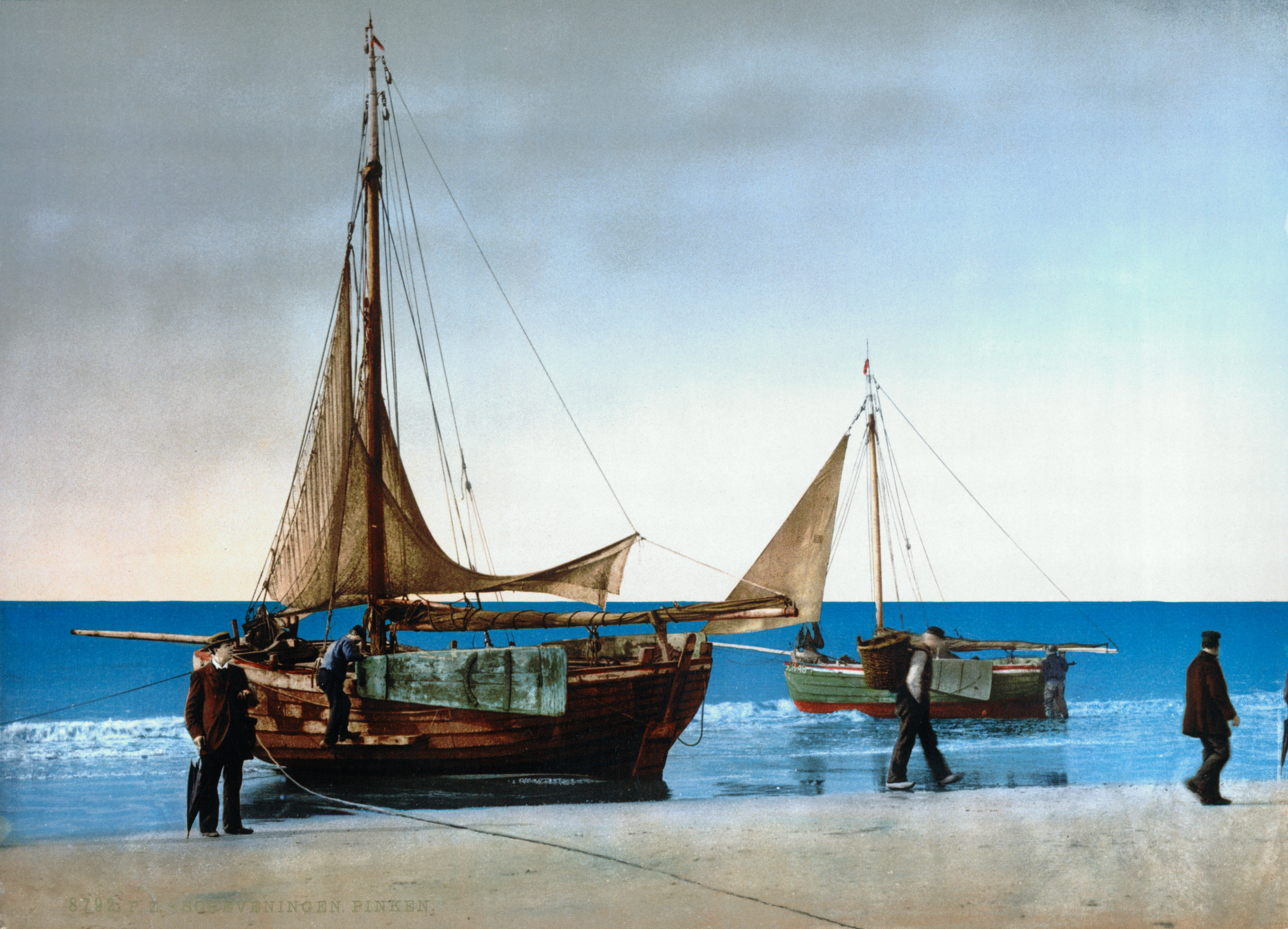
Two pinks on the beach of Scheveningen, Netherlands (photochrom, c. 1900)

In 1657, following notice on 9 October, White was sent by the Council of State to Fort-Mardyck to take charge of matters there and was lost at sea on the return journey. On 7 December 1657, Admiral Richard Stayner reported that the Half Moon had arrived from Mardyke but the accompanying pink containing White and Sir John Reynolds had been lost and a trunk washed up containing White's personal letters. White had gone in the pink against advice and was lost about the Goodwin Sands. John Thurloe wrote the "loss is to be much lamented, they being very worthy persons and of great use."

White left a widow, one son and three daughters, for whom an Order of the Council was made for their financial security. The funds to be paid to Major-General William Goffe, the father of Mrs White.

Parliament of England
Preceded by Sir Anthony Ashley Cooper	Member of Parliament for Tewkesbury; 1656	Succeeded by Edward Cooke
