= Robert Cooke (Parliamentarian) =

English politician

Sir Robert Cooke (c. 1598 – 1643) was an English politician who sat in the House of Commons between 1640 and 1643. He served in the Parliamentarian army in the English Civil War.

Cooke was the son of Sir William Cooke of Highnam and his wife Joyce, daughter of Sir Thomas Lucy of Charlecote Warwickshire. He graduated at Magdalen College, Oxford on 20 January 1615 and entered Gray's Inn on 21 May 1617. He was knighted on 21 July 1621. He was Lord of the Manor of Highnam and was one of the seven commissioners who surveyed the Forest of Dean in 1639.

In April 1640, Cooke was elected Member of Parliament for Gloucestershire in the Short Parliament. In November 1640 he stood at Tewkesbury but there was a double return and he was not seated as MP in the Long Parliament until August 1641. He held the seat until his death in 1643.

Cooke raised a regiment of foot for the parliamentary army by commission from Sir William Waller and was made a colonel. He was Governor of Cirencester and then Governor of Tewkesbury in April 1643 when he left the town ungarrisoned.

Cooke married Dorothy Fleetwood, daughter of Miles Fleetwood of Aldwincle, Northamptonshire. He married secondly Jane Herbert, widow of the poet/priest George Herbert and daughter of Charles Danvers of Baynton, Wiltshire. His son Edward was later MP for Tewkesbury.

Parliament of England
Vacant Parliament suspended since 1629	Member of Parliament for Gloucestershire; 1640; With: Sir Robert Tracy	Succeeded by Nathaniel Stephens; John Dutton
Preceded by Sir Anthony Ashley Cooper; Sir Edward Alford	Member of Parliament for Tewkesbury; 1641–1643; With: Sir Edward Alford; Edward Stephens	Succeeded by John Stephens; Edward Stephens
