= Rendcomb =

Village in Gloucestershire, England

Coordinates: 51.78613°N 1.97441°W

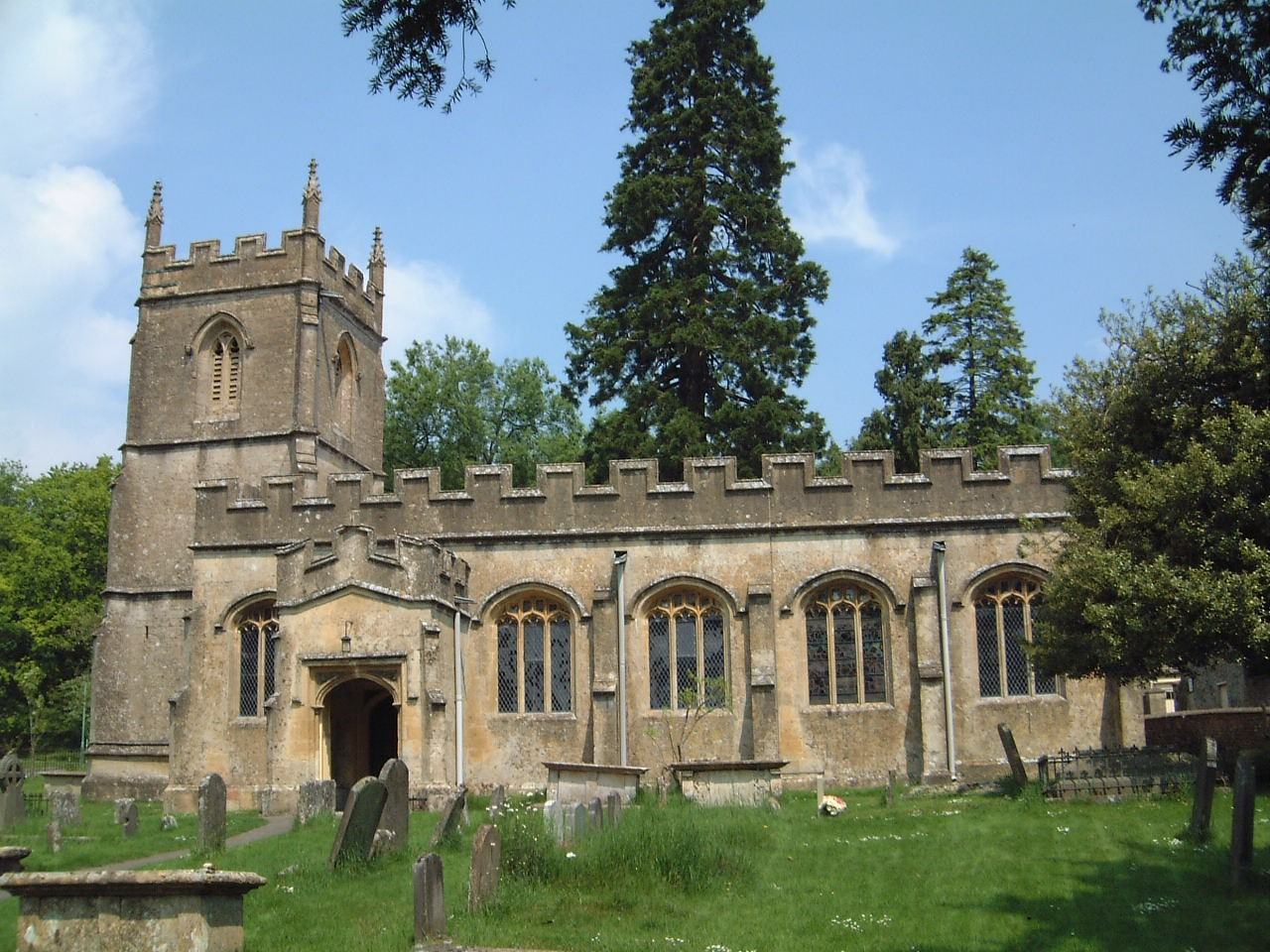
- St Peter's Church, Rendcomb

- Location within Gloucestershire
- Population: 278 (2021 census)
- OS grid reference: SP0209
- District: Cotswold
- Shire county: Gloucestershire
- Region: South West
- Country: England
- Sovereign state: United Kingdom
- Post town: Cirencester
- Postcode district: GL7
- Police: Gloucestershire
- Fire: Gloucestershire
- Ambulance: South Western
- UK Parliament: North Cotswolds

Rendcomb is a village and civil parish in the Cotswold district area of the English county of Gloucestershire. It is about five miles north of Cirencester in the Churn Valley. In 2021 the parish had a population of 278.

== History ==
=== Etymology ===
Rendcomb is thought to get its name from the stream running through the small valley or coomb which lies south of the village. The stream which flows into the Churn, was called Hrindan Broc in 852 AD, with the modern name of Rendcomb deriving from Hrindan + coomb.

=== History ===
In 1086 a total of 39 inhabitants of Rendcomb and Eycot was recorded in the Domesday Book as part of Rapsgate Hundred. By 1563, there were 12 households in Rendcomb. The existence of Rendomb Park estate was recorded in 1544, and by the 1670s it consisted of 250 acres.

During the Middle Ages, Rendcomb manor was the property of the earls of Gloucester and owned by their knights including the de la Mare family. In 1503, the manor was sold to Edmund Tame of Fairford, son of John Tame. Sir Richard Berkley was the owner in 1564 who invited Elizabeth I to the manor house in 1592. It later came into the possession the MP Sir Christopher Guise. In 1864, the manor was sold to Sir Francis Goldsmid, MP for Reading. Soon after 1914, the estate had multiple owners and had essentially disintegrated.

St Peter's church dates from the 16th century. It was restored by Frederick R. Kempson in 1895.

The diplomat Thomas Roe was living at Rendcomb in 1608. In 1641, Sir Maurice Berkeley and Richard Berkeley of Rendcomb were fined by Parliament for supporting the Royalist cause in the English Civil War, but were spared having their estates seized.

About 1773, the lord of the manor, Sir William Guise, improved access from the village to Cirencester by building a new road.

Sir Berkeley Guise funded a charity school at Rendcomb from 1808.

In the mid-1860s, Sir Francis Goldsmid rebuilt the manor-house, Rendcomb Park, and made some improvements to the village, including a new river bridge and funds for the village school which closed in 1930. Philip Hardwick was the architect commissioned to undertake the improvements.

== Education ==
A free school was established in 1808, supported by Berkeley Guise.

In 1857, a National school was built and supported by Sir Goldsmid. It closed in 1930

In 1920 Rendcomb College, a public school, was founded at Rendcomb Park adjacent to the village.

== Notable residents ==
- Frederick Sanger (1918–2013), biochemist who won the Nobel Prize in Chemistry twice, in 1958 and 1980; the fourth person to win two Nobel Prizes
- R. N. D. Wilson (1899–1953), Irish poet who taught at Rendcomb College from 1934 to 1944

== See also ==
- Rendcomb College
