= Henry Poole (died 1616) =

Member of the Parliament of England

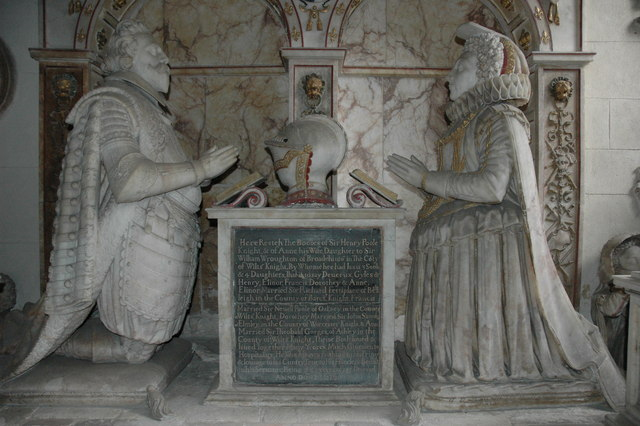
Monument of Sir Henry and Lady Anne Poole in St Kenelm's Church in Sapperton, Gloucestershire.

Sir Henry Poole (1541 – 31 August 1616) was an English politician who sat in the House of Commons in 1593.

Poole was the son of Sir Giles Poole and his first wife Elizabeth Whittington. He was admitted at Inner Temple in 1562. From 1573 he was a JP for Gloucestershire and was an ecclesiastical commissioner in 1574. He was concerned about religious dissenters and in 1578 brought notice of a sect to the Privy Council and was directed to round them up. Before 1585 he acquired the manor of Pinbury. He was knighted in 1587 and was High Sheriff of Gloucestershire in 1588. He inherited the family estates on the death of his father in 1589. In 1588 he was Captain of a company of the Gloucestershire Trained Bands in Queen Elizabeth I's army facing the invasion threat of the Spanish Armada.

In 1593, Poole was elected Member of Parliament for Gloucestershire and was also a subsidy commissioner. He was commissioner for restraint of grain and a member of the council in marches of Wales in 1594. He was also J.P. for many border counties. In 1600 and 1601, he was ordered to send a horse for service in Ireland. He continued to acquire property, paying £1,320 for the manor and advowson of Daglingworth, and purchasing the manor of Edgworth in 1601. He was High Sheriff of Gloucestershire again in 1603. Shortly before he died he bought further lands, paying £2,600 for the manors of Cirencester Oakley, Siddington Peter and Siddington Mary.

Poole died at the age of 76 having made the request in his will to be buried in Sapperton church, with a sum of money provided for the erection of "a comely and convenient tomb".

Poole married Anne Wroughton, daughter of Sir William Wroughton of Broad Hinton, Wiltshire and had three sons and four daughters. His son Henry was also an MP.

Parliament of England
Preceded by Sir Thomas Throckmorton; Edward Wynter	Member of Parliament for Gloucestershire; 1593; With: Sir John Pointz	Succeeded by Sir John Tracy; Sir John Hungerford
