= Thomas Throckmorton (died 1568) =

English politician

Sir Thomas Throckmorton (born by 1516, died 1 March 1568) was an English landowner, sheriff of Gloucestershire, and member of parliament.

The eldest son of William Throckmorton of Tortworth, by his wife Margaret, a daughter and coheiress of Sir David Mathew of Radyr, Glamorgan, the young Throckmorton had succeeded his father by May 1537 and later also succeeded his uncle George Throckmorton on 16 October 1548.

He held commissions in Gloucestershire for sewers, 1543, musters, 1546, chantries, 1548, and relief, 1550. By 1548, he was a servant of Edward Seymour, 1st Duke of Somerset. He was a Member of the Parliament of England for Heytesbury in 1547 and Westbury in 1555, sheriff of Gloucestershire for 1558–1559, and a member of the Council in the Marches of Wales from 1560 until his death in 1568, when he was buried at Tortworth.

Thomas Throckmorton was knighted on 2 October 1553, during the coronation of Mary I of England, at Westminster Palace.

By 1538 Throckmorton had married Margaret, a daughter and coheiress of Thomas Whittington of Pauntley, Gloucestershire. They had two sons, including Sir Thomas, and two daughters. His daughter Anne married Sir John Tracy (died 1591) of Toddington, Gloucestershire, and was the mother of John Tracy, 1st Viscount Tracy.
