= Edward Wynter =

Member of the Parliament of England

Sir Edward Wynter or Wintour (born 1560, died 1619) was an English mariner and landowner who sat in the House of Commons at various times between 1587 and 1601. He developed the iron workings around the family estates at Lydney in the Forest of Dean, which in his son's time were of importance to the Royalist cause. His marriage to Lady Anne Somerset produced a strongly Roman Catholic allegiance among his children.

== Life ==
Wynter was the eldest son of Admiral Sir William Wynter of Lydney, Gloucestershire (died 1589) and his wife Mary Langton. He matriculated at Brasenose College, Oxford on 20 December 1577, aged 17 and was awarded BA on 28 January 1579. He was a student of the Inner Temple in 1579. In 1587, he was elected Member of Parliament for Newport. Wynter sailed to the Caribbean with Sir Francis Drake, setting out as Captain of the Aid in the voyage of 1585-1586, during which his brother Nicholas Wynter was lost.

In August 1588, Wynter served on board his father's ship against the Spanish Armada. In February 1589 his father died, and in that month Edward took his seat as MP for Gloucestershire. His father's will, naming Edward sole executor, was proved on 15 March 1588/89 by oath of his attorney. He succeeded his father to the estate which Sir William had built up since c.1560 around the manors and dependencies of Lydney. At about this time, Wynter killed Henry Walsh of Little Sodbury in a duel in Marylebone, for which he was granted a royal pardon.

Soon afterwards, having resolved to journey abroad, he was captured in 1589 and was sold as a prisoner to the Spanish ambassador in France, Bernardino de Mendoza. He was at first held in Amiens, but was soon afterwards transferred to the castle of Antwerp, for almost four years. During this period lawsuits were brought against him in England which he was unable to defend, except through appeal to members of the Council. He became a hostage against the release of Don Pedro de Valdes, General of the Andalusian squadron, who had been captured by the English at the time of the armada. Upon his release Wynter found he was expected to pay a large ransom for the release of Valdes, owing to the inequality of their condition.

As patron of Lydney church he presented Antony Stirrey, or Sterry, as vicar in 1594, who was instituted in August 1595 and remained in that living (as rector from 1603) until at least 1623. Stirrey, who had been rector of Abenhall since 1568, was also curate of Aylburton chapel at Lydney from 1612. Wynter was knighted in 1595, and on 11 August in that year he married Lady Anne Somerset, daughter of Edward Somerset, 4th Earl of Worcester.

An insight into Sir Edward's household at Lydney arises from an event which led to legal proceedings in Star Chamber in 1597. A young African man called Edward, Wynter's godson, referred to as "Swarthye" (i.e., black), held the relatively senior office of porter, with authority over many of the junior servants: he is one of a number of examples of Africans holding status in late Tudor English households. It is thought most likely that he was brought to England by Sir Edward from the expedition with Drake in 1585-86. In 1596, in the great hall of White Cross Manor at Lydney, at Wynter's instruction, he administered a whipping to an Englishman John Guye (who had been Wynter's steward and was thereupon discharged from service). Swarthye, who died in 1627, remained attached to the household.

Wynter was High Sheriff of Gloucestershire from November 1598 to December 1599. On 19 January 1601, he became Constable of St Briavels Castle and Keeper of the Forest of Dean on the death of the 2nd Earl of Pembroke. In letter in the Cecil Papers, Wynter refers to the Earl's demands that he should pay sureties for his own behaviour in this office. He was elected MP for Gloucestershire again in 1601. On 10 January 1609, he surrendered his posts as constable and keeper to the 3rd Earl of Pembroke.

Wynter's iron production in the Forest of Dean involved the felling of coppices and development of charcoal pits for fuel for smelting, in addition to open-cast quarrying or levelling for iron ore and for outcrops of coal. Wynter built his furnaces for the extraction of metal from ore (which required water-power to drive bellows) beside the stream that crosses the Lydney vale. In all these respects he met with the protests and reprisals of the Freeminers and Commoners of the Forest, who thought their customary rights were being taken away and the benefits redirected to private interest. In 1606/07 Wynter brought proceedings against a group of Commoners in Star Chamber, claiming that he had been the victim of malicious hostility whipped up against him. He purchased rights to timber from the Crown in 1611, but this led to several further disputes with the Commoners, who were concerned that they would have no wood left for their own use: he surrendered these rights in 1616.

== Death and issue ==
Wynter died on 3 March 1619.

Wynter married Anne Somerset, a daughter of Edward Somerset, 4th Earl of Worcester. She danced in masques at court, including The Masque of Queens and The Masque of Beauty. Their children included:

- Edward Wynter (died in childhood)
- Sir John Wynter (c.1600-1676), ironmaster. An ardent catholic and royalist. On 15 March 1627 he paid for 4000 cords of wood to be felled in the Forest of Dean.
- Robert Wynter
- William Wynter
- Edward Wynter. Edward Wintour and Frederick Wintour were said in 1635 to have gone in person as gentleman adventurers to Lord Baltimore's plantation of Maryland, a haven for English Roman Catholics of which they were among the original founders.
- Henry Frederick Wynter
- Elizabeth Wynter, married Richard Monington of Sarnesfield, Herefordshire.
- Anne Wynter (1597-1676), married Benedict Hall (c. 1582-1660) of High Meadow, Newland, Gloucestershire: among their daughters were
  - Cecilia Hall (1625-1651) and
  - Catherine Hall (1634-1692, abbess 1673-77) who together entered the Benedictine Abbey of Our Lady of Consolation at Cambrai (Artois) in 1646. Their mother also retired there in 1675 and is buried with them there.
- Marie Winter (1604-1630) was received into the English Monastery of the Assumption of Our Blessed Lady, in Brussels, as a Benedictine nun on 15 August 1618.

It was a younger Sir Edward Winter (1621/22-1686) who became an administrator for the East India Company.

Parliament of England
Preceded by Robert Mordaunt; Walter Covert	Member of Parliament for Newport; 1587; With: John Osborne	Succeeded by William Cavendish; Daniel Rogers
Preceded by William Bridges; Sir William Wynter	Member of Parliament for Gloucestershire; 1589; With: Sir Thomas Throckmorton	Succeeded by Sir Henry Poole; Sir John Pointz
Preceded by Sir John Tracy; Sir John Hungerford	Member of Parliament for Gloucestershire; 1601; With: John Throckmorton	Succeeded by Hon. Sir Thomas Berkeley; Sir Richard Berkeley
