= William Cooke (of Highnam) =

English politician

Sir William Cooke (14 February 1572 – 2 March 1619) of Highnam Court in Gloucestershire, was an English landowner and politician who sat in the House of Commons at various times between 1597 and 1614.

== Origins ==
He was the son of William Cooke (died 1589) of Westminster, Member of Parliament, a younger son of Sir Anthony Cooke of Gidea Hall in Essex. His mother was Frances Grey, a first-cousin to Lady Jane Grey and a granddaughter of Thomas Grey, 2nd Marquess of Dorset and of Anthony Browne, 1st Viscount Montagu. His father held the office of Clerk of Liveries in the Court of Wards and arranged for the office to be passed on to his son.

== Career ==
Cooke was educated at Shrewsbury School in 1583. He became Clerk of Liveries on the death of his father in 1589, though he was only 17. He was admitted for the study of law at Gray's Inn in 1592. In 1593 he went abroad, with a two-years’ licence to travel after his mother's unsuccessful attempt to arrange a marriage for him while he was a minor. By 1596 he was a Justice of the Peace for Hertfordshire.

Cooke's father's eldest sister, Mildred Cooke, had married Lord Burghley, and Cooke received patronage from both Burghley and Sir Robert Cecil, his own first cousin. Cecil's influence may have secured him his seats in Parliament. In 1597 he was elected a Member of Parliament for Helston. By January 1599 he was Purveyor to the Stable and had sufficient property to offer himself, with six men and horses, for service to Queen Elizabeth I. In 1601 he was elected an MP for Westminster. He was knighted at Theobalds House on 7 May 1603. In 1604 he was elected an MP for Wigan. He enhanced his estates by purchasing further land in and around Gloucester, and also owned Ribbesford Manor and other property in Worcestershire. In the reign of King James I he was keeper of the lodge and herbage of Hartwell Park, Northamptonshire. By 1605 he was a JP for Gloucestershire. He was steward of the manor of Bury St. Edmunds by 1614. In 1614 he was elected as an MP for Gloucestershire.

== Marriages and children ==
Cooke married twice:

- Firstly to Joyce Lucy, only child of Thomas Lucy (1551–1605) of Charlecote, Warwickshire (son of Sir Thomas Lucy) by his first wife, Dorothea Arnold, only child and sole heiress of Ronald Arnold of Highnam Court in Gloucestershire. As Joyce's mother died soon after her birth, she became the heiress of Highnam which she thus brought to Cooke on her marriage. By his wife he had at least three sons and five daughters, including:
  - Anne Cooke, youngest daughter, wife of Sir Sir Peter Ball, of Mamhead in Devon, and mother of the astronomer William Ball, founder and treasurer of the Royal Society, and of the physician Peter Ball, both Fellows of the Royal Society.
- Secondly he married Radigan (also spelt Radagand, etc.) Boscawen, second daughter of Nicholas Boscawen of Cornwall (a member of whose family was created Viscount Falmouth in 1706) and widow of Richard Cole (1568-1614) of Slade in the parish of Cornwood, Devon, and of Bokish in the parish of Woolfardisworthy in North Devon, whose large monument with effigy survives in All Hallows Church, Woolfardisworthy. The marriage was childless. It seems she was loved by her two Cooke step-daughters (namely Elizabeth Scudamore of Kentchurch Court in Herefordshire and Ann Ball, wife of Sir Peter Ball, of Mamhead in Devon,) who each named one of their daughters "Radagand".

== Death ==
Cooke died at the age 45, and the clerkship of the liveries, which had become ‘quasi-hereditary’, stayed in his family.

== Notes ==
Parliament of England
Preceded by William Gardiner; Ralph Knevitt	Member of Parliament for Helston; 1597; With: Nicholas Saunders	Succeeded by William Twysden; Hannibal Vyvyan
Preceded by Thomas Knyvet; Anthony Mildmay	Member of Parliament for Westminster; 1601; With: Thomas Knyvet	Succeeded by Thomas Knyvet; Sir Walter Cope
Preceded by Roger Downes; John Pulteney	Member of Parliament for Wigan; 1604–1611; With: Sir John Pulteney	Succeeded by Gilbert Gerard; Sir Richard Molyneux
Preceded by Sir Thomas Berkeley; John Throckmorton	Member of Parliament for Gloucestershire; 1614; With: Richard Berkeley	Succeeded by Sir Robert Tracy; Maurice Berkeley
