= Edward Cooke (Roundhead) =

English politician

Edward Cooke (died 1683) was an English politician who sat in the House of Commons in 1659.

Cooke was the son of Sir Robert Cooke. He was a colonel of horse in the Parliamentary army.

In 1659, Cooke was elected Member of Parliament for Tewkesbury in the Third Protectorate Parliament.

Cooke died in 1683 without issue.

Parliament of England
Preceded by Francis White	Member of Parliament for Tewkesbury; 1659; With: Sir Robert Long, 1st Baronet	Succeeded by Not represented in Restored Rump
