= Chavenage House =

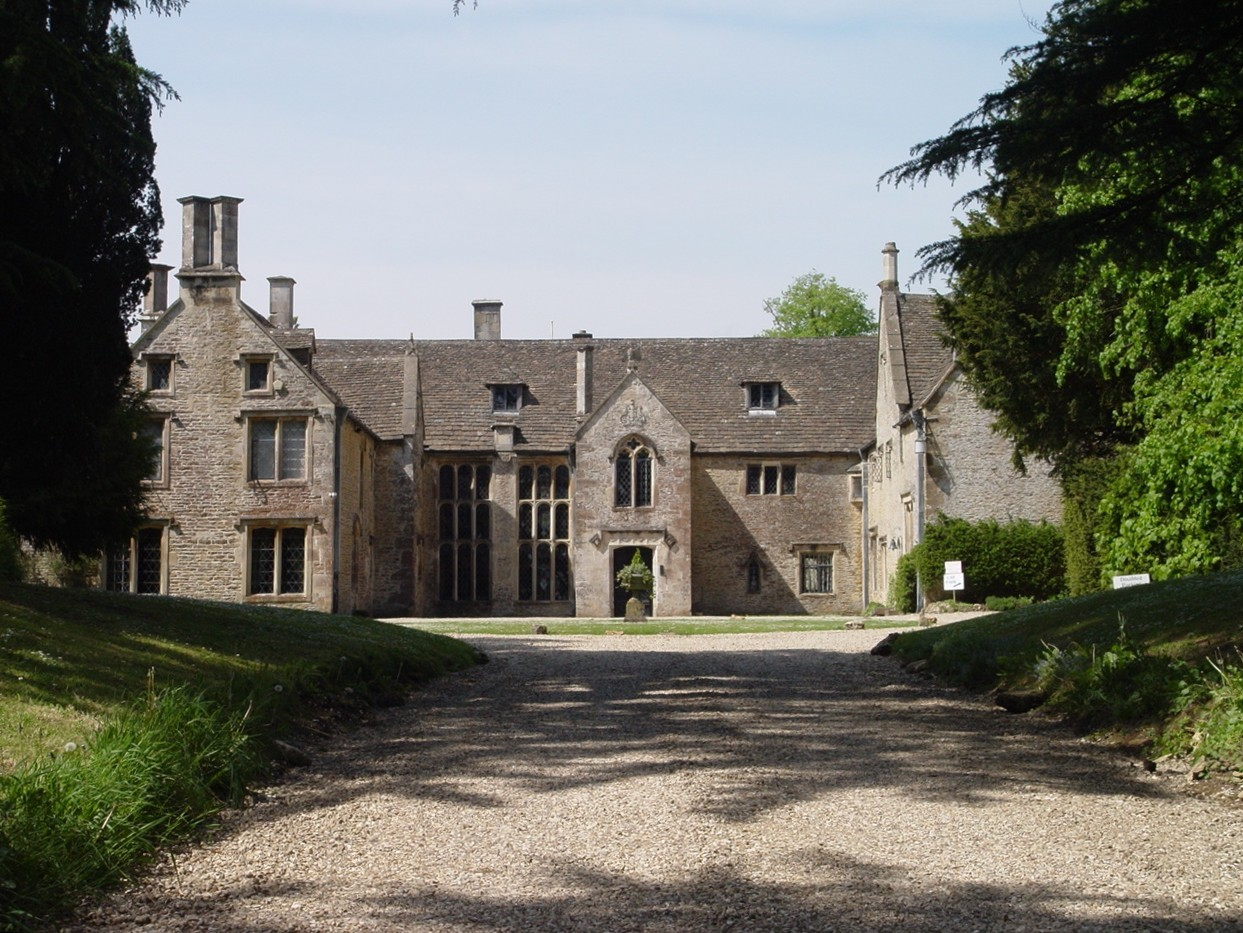
- "The ideal sixteenth-century Cotswold stone manor house"

- Location within Gloucestershire
- 51.6554°N 2.1865°W
- Type: House
- Location: Tetbury, Gloucestershire

History
- Built: 16th century

Site notes
- Architectural style: Elizabethan
- Governing body: Privately owned

Listed Building – Grade I
- Official name: Chavenage House and Chapel
- Designated: 16 March 1987
- Reference no.: 1152854

Listed Building – Grade II
- Official name: Pair of gatepiers at Chavenage House and adjoining quadrant walls
- Designated: 16 March 1987
- Reference no.: 1089754

Listed Building – Grade II
- Official name: Folly at Chavenage House
- Designated: 16 March 1987
- Reference no.: 1152873

Chavenage House, Tetbury, Gloucestershire is an English country house. A Grade I listed building, it is described in the Gloucestershire: Cotswolds volume of the Pevsner Buildings of England series as "the ideal sixteenth-century Cotswold stone manor house".

== History ==
The estate of Chavenage was sold to Edward Stephens of Eastington in Gloucestershire in 1564. He built the house in the Elizabethan style, the then-current early Renaissance architecture, adding large windows to the south of the porch. Much of the glass was obtained from redundant religious buildings such as nearby Horsley Priory, following the Dissolution of the Monasteries a generation earlier.

On Edward's death in 1587, the estate passed to his son, Richard Stephens of Eastington. On Richard's death in 1599, the estate passed to his son Nathaniel Stephens, then only ten years old. When the Civil War tore the country apart in the 1640s, Stephens and Chavenage were Parliamentarians or Roundheads, on the side of Oliver Cromwell. He raised troops and joined Cromwell's Parliament. Cromwell visited Chavenage House, and Stephens supported his planned regicide, and although he was not one of the signatories of Charles I's death warrant, he is nevertheless said to have died of remorse soon afterwards. It is also recounted that on the day of Nathaniel's death, his ghost was seen leaving the house in a coach driven by a headless coachman dressed like the hapless king. The house is reputed to be one of the nation's most haunted homes.

In 1801, the house was inherited by Henry Hannes Willis, who changed his name to Stephens in order to inherit. Henry added the billiard room, panelling and carvings to many of the rooms.

The house has been owned by the Lowsley-Williams family since 1891. They employed the architect John Thomas Micklewaite to add the east wing, which includes an oak panelled ballroom. In 1944, the house was requisitioned and housed American troops prior to the Normandy landings in France. In 1958 it was given to David Lowsley-Williams (1934-2023) on the occasion of his marriage to Rona McCorquodale. At a time when many similar houses were being demolished, or being turned over to English Heritage, the Lowsley-Williams maintained the house in private ownership. They opened it to the public to a limited extent, for example as a wedding venue and a film location.

In 2024, having skipped a generation for tax reasons, Chavenage came into the hands of James "Hank" Lowsley-Williams, a former pro cyclist and presenter on Global Cycling Network. James has launched a YouTube channel called Life at the Manor where he documents his journey in remodelling the house and improving its profitability.

== The house ==
The house is an Elizabethan house and is a Grade I listed building. It was built originally in 1576 by Edward Stephens. It has an E-shaped plan with a porch at the centre of the east side. It is constructed of rubble stone with a stone slate roof and has two storeys and attics. It was enlarged in the 17th century and further extended in the 18th century by the Rev Richard Stephens, then again at the start of the 20th century. As these additions are in keeping with the original style and materials, they appear as one consistent building and the new areas are not obvious. David Verey and Alan Brooks, in their first volume of the Pevsner Architectural Guide to the county, describe Chavenage as "the ideal 16th-century Cotswold stone manor house".

The interior has a former open great hall, but this has now had a ceiling installed, with an altered minstrels' gallery over a screen. This is 16th century as is the Renaissance style fireplace and the panelling and Gothic fireplace in the dining room. Other notable features of the house are the two tapestry rooms Cromwell's and Ireton's Room; the stained glass windows in the Great Hall; the Oak Room which has elaborate 1590 panelling. Additionally, there is an Edwardian wing, featuring a sprung-floored ballroom.

Close to the house is the family chapel which is included in the Grade I listing. It has a tower, built as a folly in the 17th century, with two stages, stepped diagonal buttresses and a parapet with embattlements. The main fabric of the chapel is 18th century and it has an undercover link to the house.

== Filming location ==
Chavenage has been used in films and for television programmes, including Barry Lyndon, The Ghost of Greville Lodge, the first Hercule Poirot story The Mysterious Affair at Styles, a 'gotcha' for Noel's House Party, The Barchester Chronicles, Berkeley Square, Cider with Rosie, Grace & Favour, The House of Eliott, Casualty and Dracula. From 2008 the house was featured as Candleford Manor in the BBC's Lark Rise to Candleford. Scenes from Bonekickers, Tess of the D'Urbervilles starring Eddie Redmayne, and In Love with Barbara were shot at Chavenage in 2008.

Recent credits include Rosamunde Pilcher's The Four Seasons. BBC credits include Nightwatch, am I being unreasonable, and CBBC's series Sparticles. Two productions were shot at Chavenage in 2013, The Unknown Heart, based on an idea by Rosamunde Pilcher as well the historical drama New Worlds (Channel 4), starring Jamie Dornan. Chavenage is Trenwith House in the adaption of Winston Graham's Poldark (2015 TV series), starring Aidan Turner. The house also serves as the family home of Turner's character in Rivals.

== Sources ==
- Verey, David; Brooks, Alan (2000). Gloucestershire: The Cotswolds. The Buildings of England. Harmondsworth, UK: Penguin Books. ISBN 0-14-071098 1.
