= Richard Berkeley (died 1661) =

English politician (1579–1661)

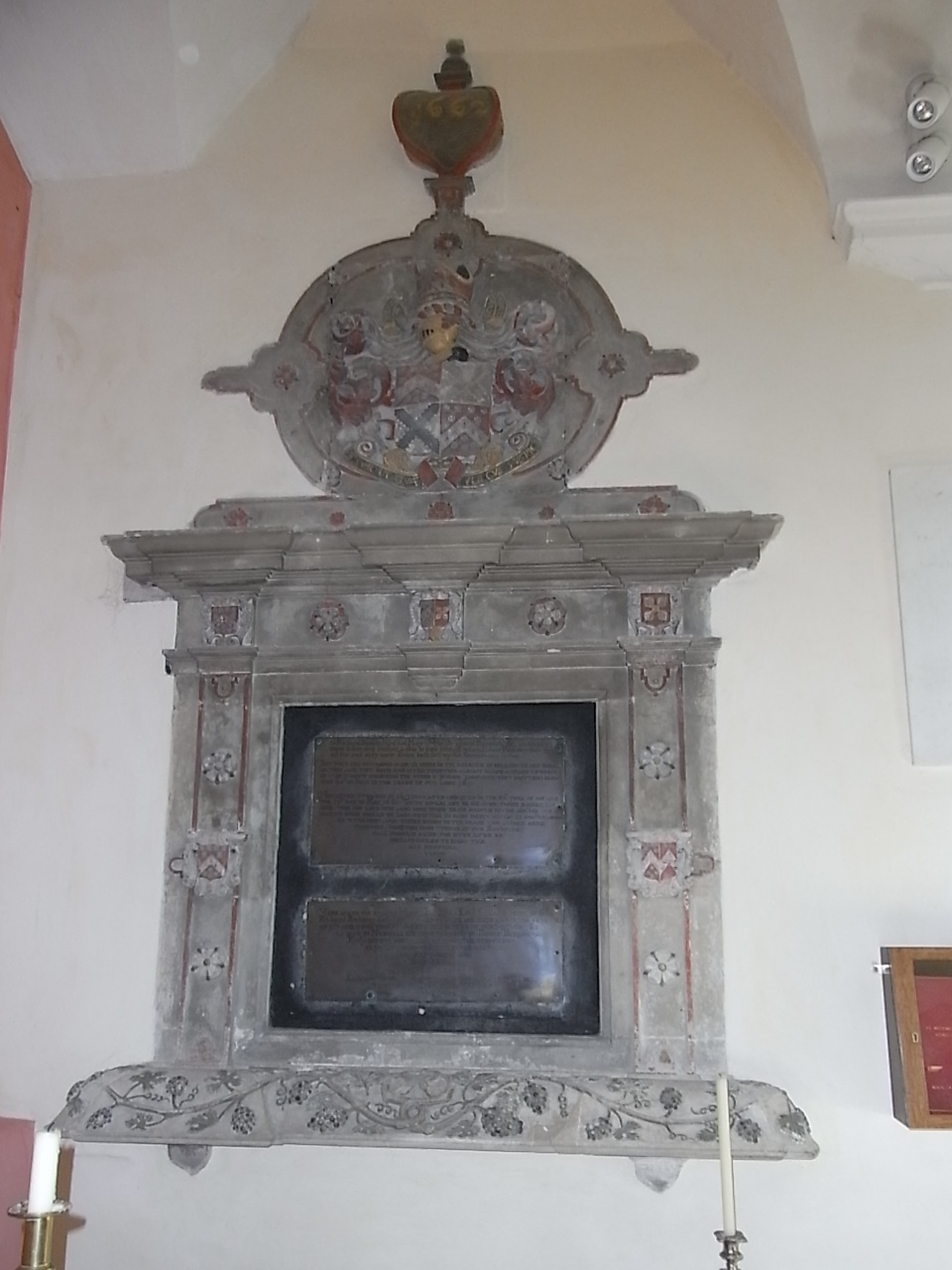
Mural monument to Richard Berkeley (died 1661), St Michael's Church, Stoke Gifford, Gloucestershire

Arms of Berkeley of Stoke Gifford: Gules, a chevron ermine between ten crosses pattée six in chief and four in base argent. These are the arms of the Barons Berkeley of Berkeley Castle with the difference of a chevron ermine in place of a chevron argent

Richard Berkeley (1579–1661) of Stoke Gifford and Rendcomb both in Gloucestershire, England, served as a Member of Parliament for Gloucestershire in 1614.

== Origins ==
Berkeley was the only son and heir of Sir Henry Berkeley (died 1606) of Stoke Gifford and Rendcomb (son of Sir Richard Berkeley (1531–1604) of Stoke Gifford, who in 1553 rebuilt the manor house at Stoke Gifford (rebuilt again in 1750 as survives today) and whose effigy survives in the Gaunt's Chapel in Bristol) by his wife Muriel Throckmorton, a daughter of Thomas Throckmorton (1534–1615), of Coughton Court, Warwickshire, twice MP for Warwickshire (in 1558 and 1559) eldest son and heir of Sir Robert Throckmorton (d.1581) of Coughton by his wife Muriel Berkeley, a daughter of Thomas Berkeley, de jure 5th Baron Berkeley (1472–1532). The Berkeley family of Stoke Gifford was descended from Maurice de Berkeley (d.1347), killed at the Siege of Calais, who had acquired the manor of Stoke Gifford in 1337, the second son of Maurice de Berkeley, 2nd Baron Berkeley (1271–1326) of Berkeley Castle in Gloucestershire.

== Career ==
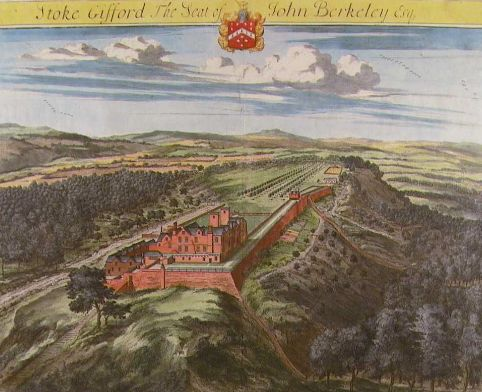
Stoke Hall, Stoke Gifford, seat of the Berkeley family, view of the old Tudor manor house built in 1553 by Sir Richard Berkeley (1531 – 1604). Drawn in 1707 by Johannes Kip (1653–1722). The site is today occupied by a large Georgian house known as "Stoke House/Stoke Park" or "The Dower House"

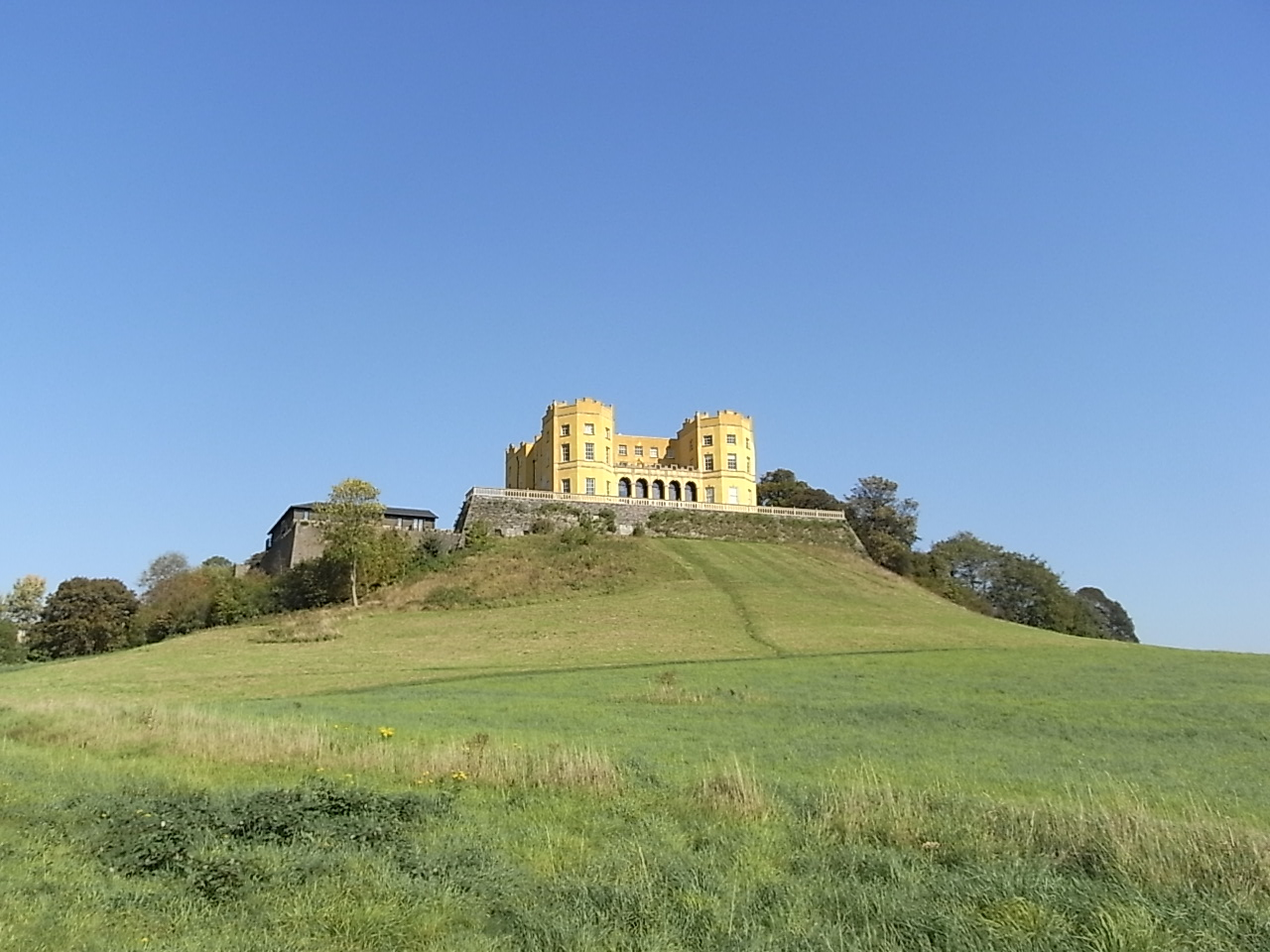
The present Georgian "Stoke House/Stoke Park" or "The Dower House", built in 1750 by Norborne Berkeley, 4th Baron Botetourt (d.1770), which replaced the earlier Tudor manor house. It was inherited by his sister the Dowager Duchess of Beaufort (d.1799), and then passed into the ducal family, of Badminton House, Gloucestershire. The 8th Duke of Beaufort died at Stoke House in 1899

He matriculated at Magdalen College, Oxford on 4 February 1592 aged 12. In 1614, Berkeley was elected as a Member of Parliament for Gloucestershire. Berkeley supported the King in the Civil War and on 2 February 1647 he compounded and was fined at £370 on 6 February. On 11 April 1649, he was assessed at £150. On 1 August 1649, he was to be discharged on payment of £60 but, on 5 December 1651, he was ordered to pay £80 extra on old rent. Having paid it, on 30 January 1652 his assessment of £100 was discharged and sequestration was taken off his estate. Berkeley died in 1661 aged 83.

== Marriages and issue ==
Berkeley married twice:

- Firstly to Mary Roe/Rowe (1579–1615), a daughter of Robert Roe/Rowe of the City of London, and of Knotts in the parish of Leyton, in Essex, a Haberdasher, by his wife Eleanor Jermy (later the second wife of Sir Richard Berkeley (d.1604) of Stoke Gifford, grandfather of Sir Richard Berkeley), a daughter of Robert Jermy of Antingham, Norfolk. Mary Roe/Rowe's only brother was Sir Thomas Roe (c.1581-1644), Knight, a diplomat, scholar and Member of Parliament. The Rowe family was of Kentish origin and included three Lord Mayors of London in the 16th and 17th centuries. Berkeley survived his first wife Mary Roe/Rowe by 46 years. His issue included:

- Sir Maurice Berkeley (1599–1654), eldest son and heir, a Member of Parliament for Gloucestershire;
- John Berkeley
- Thomas Berkeley (born 1605), 3rd son, matriculated at Magdalen Hall, Oxford, on 23 June 1621, aged 16 and obtained BA in 1624.
- Gyles Berkeley
- Richard Berkeley
- Robert Berkeley (d. post 1661), youngest son, the only one living at his father's death, who erected the mural monument in his memory in Stoke Gifford Church.
- Ellen Berkeley, wife of George Elliott of Godalming in Surrey;
- Elizabeth Berkeley
- Muriell Berkeley
- Catherine Berkeley
- Mary Berkeley
- Margaret Berkeley

- Secondly he married Jane Meriett, a daughter of Sir Thomas Meriett/Marriott of Strowdes Place/Vyne's Place in the parish of Remenham in Berkshire. Without issue.

== Monument ==
His mural monument survives in St Michael's Church, Stoke Gifford, Gloucestershire, inscribed on a brass tablet as follows:

To Richard Berkeley, Esqr, and Mary his wife (daughter of Robert Roe of London, Esqr) deare father and mother, a clue to their love, of whom Robert Berkeley their youngest son and only now living hath sett up this remembrance of them. Shee when shee had passed neare 36 yeres in the exercise of religioues and morall duties and they boathe had lived together almost halfe a yeare upwards of 17 (without knoweing the other 2 whose comforts they envyed) died the 24th of July in the yeare of our Lord 1615. He lived upwards of 46 yeres after and dyed in the 83d yere of his age the 12th day of May 1661. Theire soules are in Heaven theire bodies lye here. Here hee layd hers and here when death should divide him his will was his bodie should be laid, trusting in God's mercy his soule should soone be with hers, and theire bodies in the meanetime lyinge here together, together from thence at our Saviour's call should arise for ever after bodies and soules to enjoy the all happying vision

Parliament of England
Preceded by Sir Thomas Berkeley; John Throckmorton	Member of Parliament for Gloucestershire; 1614; With: Sir William Cooke	Succeeded by Sir Robert Tracy; Maurice Berkeley
