= John Dutton (politician) =

English politician (1594–1657)

John Dutton (1594 – 14 January 1657) of Sherborne Park, Gloucestershire was an English politician who sat in the House of Commons variously between 1624 and 1644. He supported the Royalist side in the English Civil War.

Dutton was the son of William Dutton, and was baptised on 5 October 1594. He was educated at Exeter College, Oxford and awarded BA on 26 October 1612. He entered Inner Temple in November 1613 to study law and was awarded DCL in 1642. He succeeded his father in 1618.

He was imprisoned for refusing to contribute ship money and in 1624 was Deputy Lieutenant for Gloucestershire.

In 1624, Dutton was elected Member of Parliament for Gloucestershire and was re-elected in 1625. He was re-elected MP for Gloucestershire in November 1640 for the Long Parliament. He supported the King and was disabled from sitting in parliament in January 1644.

Dutton sat in the King's parliament at Oxford and was active in making up the defence of Oxford. He signed the loyal letter to the Earl of Essex for peace in 1645 and drew up the articles of Oxford when the garrison was to be surrendered. He was subsequently fined £3434.

Dutton died at the age of 60 and was buried at Sherborne, Gloucestershire. His statue on his memorial is sculpted by Thomas Burman.

Dutton married firstly Elizabeth Baynton, daughter of Sir Henry Baynton, and secondly Anne King, daughter of John King, Bishop of London.

Parliament of England
Preceded by Sir Robert Tracy; Maurice Berkeley	Member of Parliament for Gloucestershire; 1624–1625; With: Sir Thomas Estcourt 1624; Sir Maurice Berkeley	Succeeded by Sir Robert Tracy; Sir Robert Pointz
Preceded by Sir Robert Tracy; Sir Robert Cooke	Member of Parliament for Gloucestershire; 1640–1644; With: Nathaniel Stephens	Succeeded by Sir John Seymour; Nathaniel Stephens
