= Nathaniel Stephens =

English politician

Nathaniel Stephens (1589 – 30 May 1660) was an English politician who sat in the House of Commons at various times between 1628 and 1653. He supported the Parliamentarian cause in the English Civil War.

== Biography ==
Stephens was the son of Richard Stephens of Eastington. He inherited Chavenage House and enhanced the house which had been reconstructed by his father. He was elected Member of Parliament for Gloucestershire in 1628 and sat until 1629 when King Charles I decided to rule without parliament for eleven years.

In November 1640, Stephens was re-elected MP for Gloucestershire in the Long Parliament. He was Colonel of a regiment of horse which he raised in support of Parliament in the Civil War. In 1644 he was sent to Gloucester to secure the town and relieve Colonel Edward Massey for other duties. In 1645 he was granted a commission to investigate the spoils of Forest of Dean.

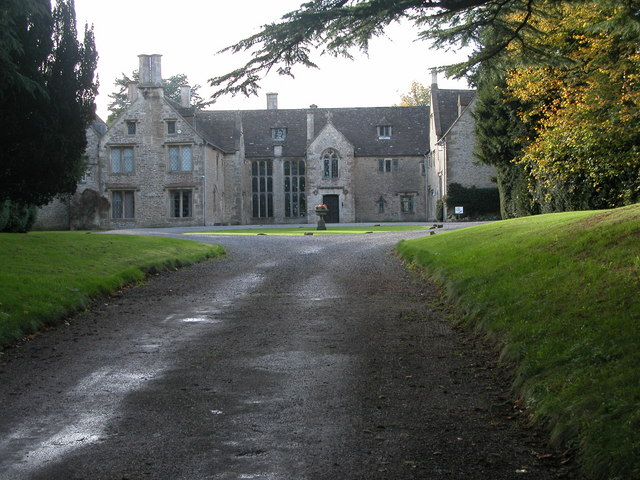
Chavenage House

Stephens acquiesced in the trial and execution of Charles I in 1649, and a few months later he was struck down with a fatal sickness, which gave rise to a ghost story.

Stephens died at the age of 71 and was buried at Eastington on 30 May 1660.

== Family ==
By 1617 Stephens had married Catherine, daughter of Robert Beale of Barnes, Surrey. They had three sons and six daughters (a son and a daughter predeceased him).

On 25 February 1661 Stephens's daughter Abigail married Edward Harley. They had four sons (one of whom predeceased his father) and one daughter, Their son Robert became 1st Earl of Oxford, and another son Edward (1664–1735) became a Member of Parliament for the constituencies of Droitwich and Leominster.

== Notes ==
Parliament of England
Preceded by Sir Robert Tracy; Sir Robert Pointz	Member of Parliament for Gloucestershire; 1628–1629; With: Sir Robert Pointz	Parliament suspended until 1640
Preceded by Sir Robert Tracy; Sir Robert Cooke	Member of Parliament for Gloucestershire; 1640–1653; With: John Dutton 1640–1644; Sir John Seymour 1645–1648	Succeeded by John Crofts; William Neast; Robert Holmes
