= Peter Ball (physician) =

English physician

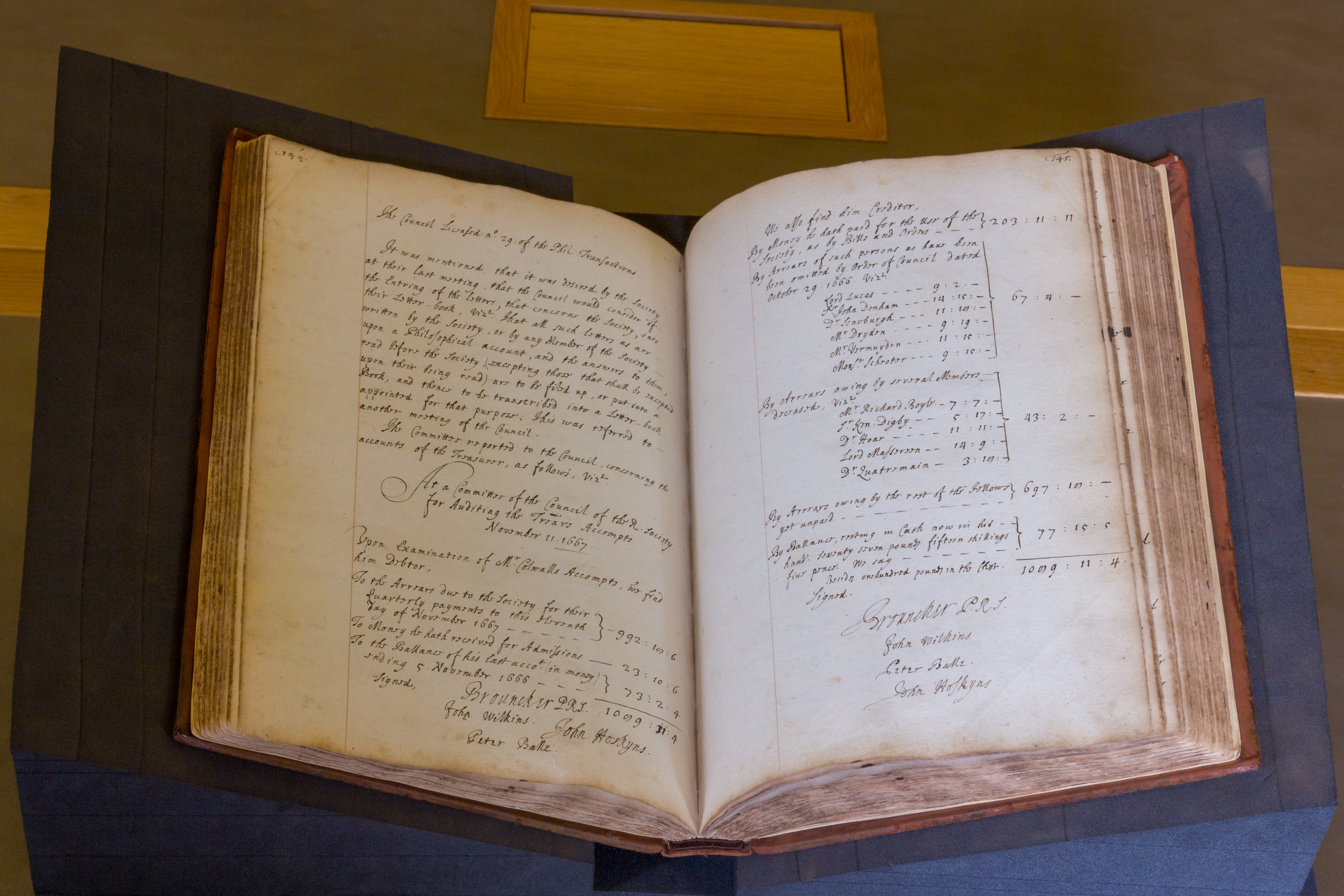
Balle's signature, signing off the 1667 accounts of the Royal Society, from the Council Minutes book

Peter Ball or Balle, M.D. (died 1675), was an English physician.

Ball was the third son of Sir Peter Ball of Mamhead Devon and his wife Anne Cooke, daughter of William Cooke. In 1652 he was admitted to the Middle Temple, London and called to the bar in 1657. Peter was entered as a medical student at Leyden on 13 January 1659, at the age of 20, but went on to Padua, where he took the degree of doctor of philosophy and physic with the highest distinction on 30 December 1660. To celebrate the occasion verses in Latin, Italian, and English were published at Padua, in which Ball, by a somewhat violent twist of his Latinised names, Petrus Bule, is made to figure as 'alter Phœbus.'

Ball was admitted an honorary fellow of the Royal College of Physicians in December 1664. He was one of the original fellows of the Royal Society, one of the council in 1666, and in the following year was placed on the committee to organise the cataloguing of the library and manuscripts of Arundel House, which had been presented to the society by Henry Howard, Esq., afterwards Duke of Norfolk.

While at Mamhead in October 1665, Ball and his elder brother William observed the Rings of Saturn as a band (or "fascia") upon the planet when they had apparently disappeared from being seen edge-on from Earth.

Ball died in July 1675 and was buried on 20 July in Temple Church.
