= Robert Pointz =

English landowner and politician

Sir Robert Pointz or Poyntz (1588–1665) was an English landowner and politician. He sat in the House of Commons for Gloucestershire, between 1626 and 1629.

== Life ==
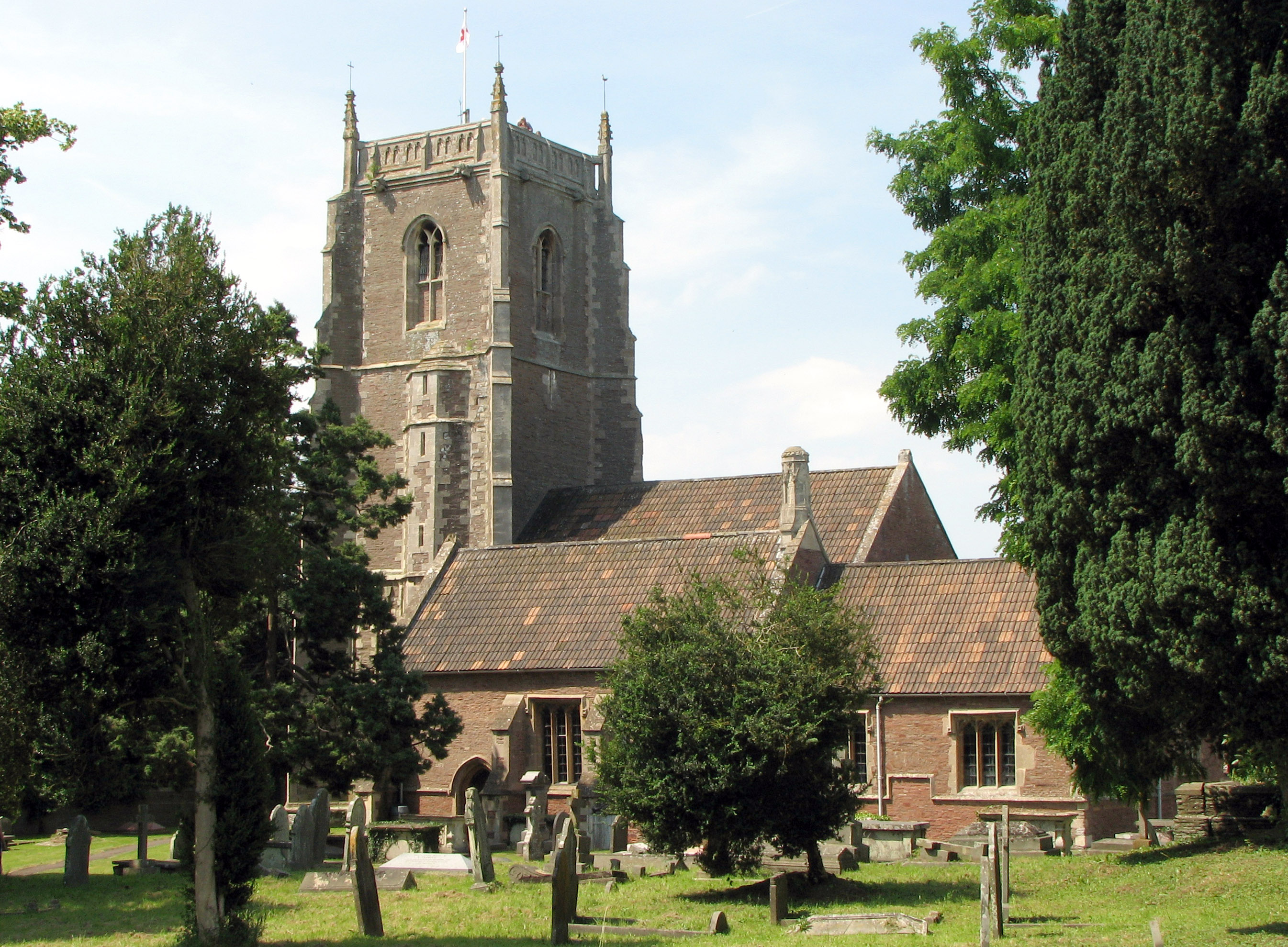
Church of St James the Less, Iron Acton

Pointz was the son of Sir John Poyntz, Lord of the Manor of Iron Acton, Gloucestershire, and his second wife Elizabeth Sydenham, daughter of Anthony Sydenham. He matriculated from Brasenose College, Oxford on 15 March 1605, aged 16. He had already in 1604 made a teenage marriage to Frances Gibbons, daughter of his stepmother Grissell Roberts by her first husband Gervase Gibbons. Frances brought him a comfortable inheritance which made him financially independent of his father, who was notorious for improvidence and died penniless. As so often in that age, however, a dispute over the Gibbons inheritance led to a lawsuit, which dragged on into the late 1630s. In the last stages of the litigation Robert, though generally regarded as a "sober and learned man", became so irritated that he insulted one of the judges, and as a result, was briefly committed to the Fleet Prison.

Apart from his father's insolvency, the principal threat to his political career was his family's traditional attachment to the Roman Catholic faith. Robert himself was a zealous Protestant, but his sister Elizabeth, Lady Thurles, mother of the first Duke of Ormond, was a prominent recusant.

In 1624 he stood unsuccessfully for Parliament as member for Gloucestershire and petitioned to be declared validly elected, also unsuccessfully. He was made a Knight of the Bath on 2 February 1626, at the coronation of Charles I. In 1626 he was elected knight of the shire for Gloucestershire. He was re-elected MP for Gloucestershire in 1628 and sat until 1629 when King Charles decided to rule without parliament for eleven years. He was High Sheriff of Gloucestershire in 1637.

In the English Civil War Pointz visited Bristol when it was a garrison for the King and later was called to account as a delinquent Royalist. On 15 March 1649, he begged to compound for delinquency, claiming that in going there, he "Never bore arms, nor contributed to the maintenance of the war against Parliament". He was fined £748 on 26 April, which was corrected after an error to £723. On 1 September 1651, he was assessed at £200, and on 10 April 1652, a request was made on his behalf for discharge from assessment on the Act of Parliament, which was granted on 13 April. In 1661 Pointz wrote a "Vindication of Monarchy".

Pointz died in 1665, and was buried at Iron Acton, on 10 November.

== Family ==
Pointz married firstly Frances Gibbons (died 1638), daughter of Gervase Gibbons of Kent and his wife Grissell Roberts (who was to become Robert's own stepmother), and secondly Cicely Smith of Acton. He had two daughters, Margaret (died 1685) and Grissell (born 1608), by his first wife, and one son John by his second. Margaret married Sir Richard Hastings, first and last of the Hastings baronets. After Sir Richard's death, she remarried Samuel Gorges. Gorges had a successful career as a judge in Ireland, no doubt largely due to the fact that the Lord Lieutenant of Ireland, James Butler, 1st Duke of Ormond, through his mother Elizabeth Pointz, was Margaret's first cousin. However, he died almost penniless. Her sister Grissell married Richard Porter. Their brother John died in 1680 without issue. Like his grandfather, he died heavily in debt.

Parliament of England
Preceded by Sir Maurice Berkeley; John Dutton	Member of Parliament for Gloucestershire; 1626–1829; With: Sir Robert Tracy; Nathaniel Stephens	Parliament suspended until 1640
