= William Ball (astronomer) =

British astronomer

William Ball (or Balle, c.1631–1690) was an English astronomer. He was one of the founding Fellows of the Royal Society. He was appointed the Society's first treasurer on 28 November 1660, and served until 1663.

He was the eldest son of Sir Peter Ball and his wife Anne Cooke, daughter of William Cooke. He became an ardent astronomer, and he gained ownership of a twelve-foot telescope. In 1655, when the Rings of Saturn had apparently disappeared due to being seen edge-on from Earth, Ball and his brother Peter observed them as a band (or "fascia") upon the planet. The same year he established the rotation rate of the planet Saturn.

In 1660 he fell 30 feet onto hard ground. This accident left him in continual ill health. In 1666 he retired to his estate in Devon and in 1668 married Mary Posthuma Hussey, they raised six children. Managing his family's estate together with its distance from London left little time to follow his scientific interests.

In a summary of Ball's observations of Saturn in 1665, his colleague Robert Moray remarked that there appeared "not one body of a Circular Figure, that embraces his Disk, but two". This cryptic remark resulted in the mid-19th century in a claim that Ball had observed what is now known as the Cassini Division in Saturn's rings, ten years before Cassini did himself, and that the feature should more correctly be known as "Ball's Division". However, actual examination of Ball's drawings of his observations does not support this claim.

The crater Ball on the Moon was named after him.
