= John Pointz =

Member of the Parliament of England

Sir John Pointz or Poyntz (c. 1560 – 1633) of Iron Acton, Gloucestershire, was an English landowner and politician who sat in the House of Commons in 1593. He is perhaps best remembered as the maternal grandfather of James Butler, 1st Duke of Ormond.

== Life ==
Pointz was the son of Sir Nicholas Poyntz of Iron Acton, Gloucestershire and his first wife Anne Verney. His grandfather Sir Nicholas Poynz was a courtier in the time of Henry VIII. His father was widely suspected of being a Roman Catholic.

He was knighted in 1588 and was appointed High Sheriff of Gloucestershire for 1591–92. He was J.P. in 1592 and was elected Member of Parliament for the seat of Gloucestershire in 1593. From 1602 he was Custos Rotulorum of the county. He was Lord of the Manor of Iron Acton.

Pointz, who was notoriously improvident, and was imprisoned for debt several times, died insolvent and intestate in 1633. In fairness to him, he had been embroiled for many years in a lawsuit about his father's will. He was buried on 29 November 1633 at Iron Acton.

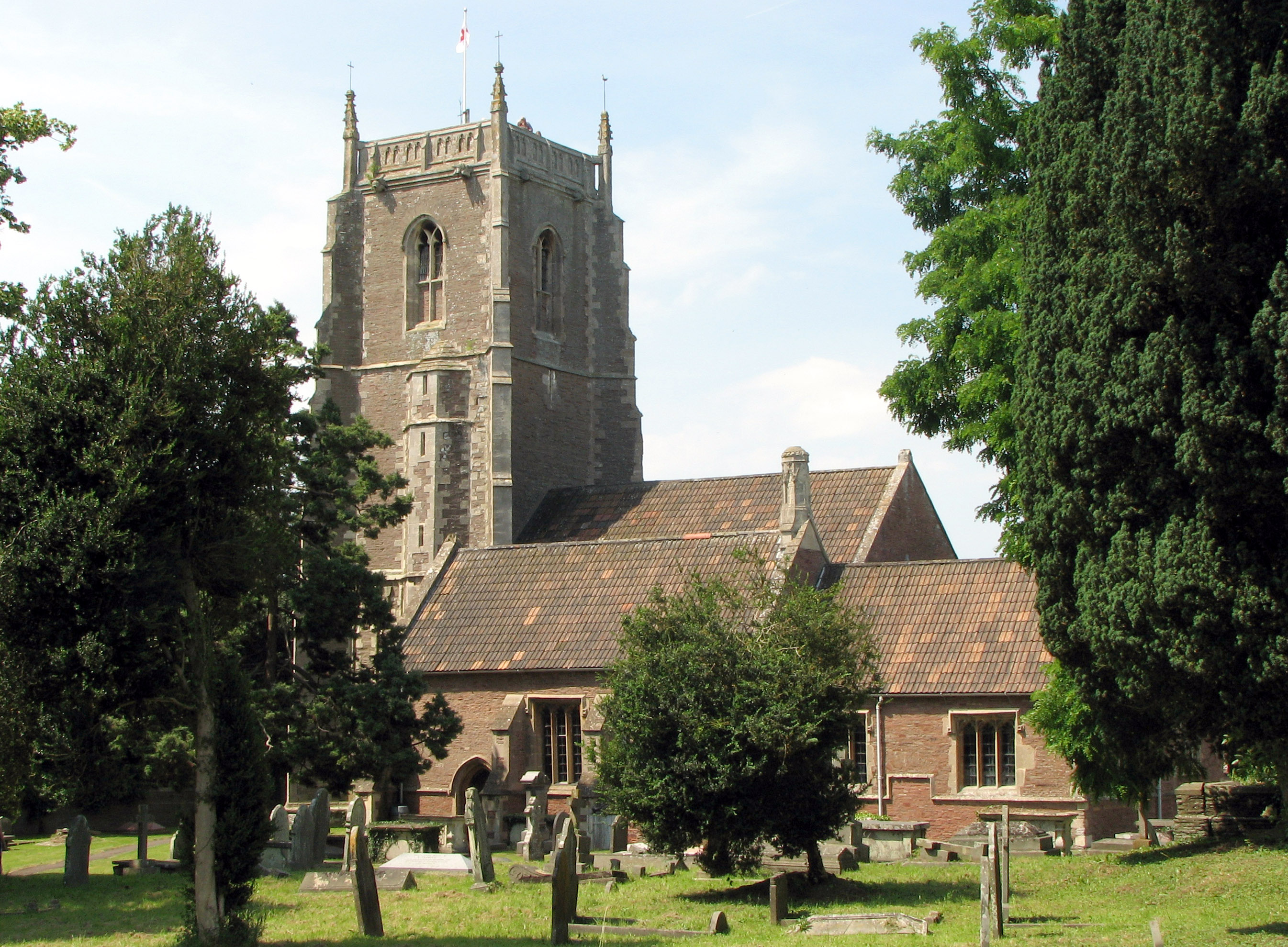
Church of St James the Less, Iron Acton

== Family ==
He married four times.

1. Ursula, daughter of Sir John Sydenham of Brympton, Somerset around 1578.

2. Elizabeth (d. 1595), daughter of Alexander Sydenham of Luxborough, Somerset around 1582

- Robert
- Dorothy married John Peny of East Coker Somerset
- Elizabeth

3. Frances (d. 1599), daughter of John Newton of Barrs Court, Gloucestershire

4. Grissell (d. 1647/8), the daughter of Walter Roberts of Glassenbury, Kent and widow of Gregory Price of Hereford, and of Gervase Gibbons of Kent in 1600.

- Nicholas (d. 1651) married Eleanor, only daughter and heir of Rice Davis of Tickenham, Somerset and Mary Pitt
- Ann married Isaac Bromwich of Gloucester
- Mary married 1) John Walter and 2) Walter Bethell

Parliament of England
Preceded by Sir Thomas Throckmorton; Edward Wynter	Member of Parliament for Gloucestershire; 1593; With: Sir Henry Poole	Succeeded by Sir John Tracy; Sir John Hungerford
