= Richard Berkeley (died 1604) =

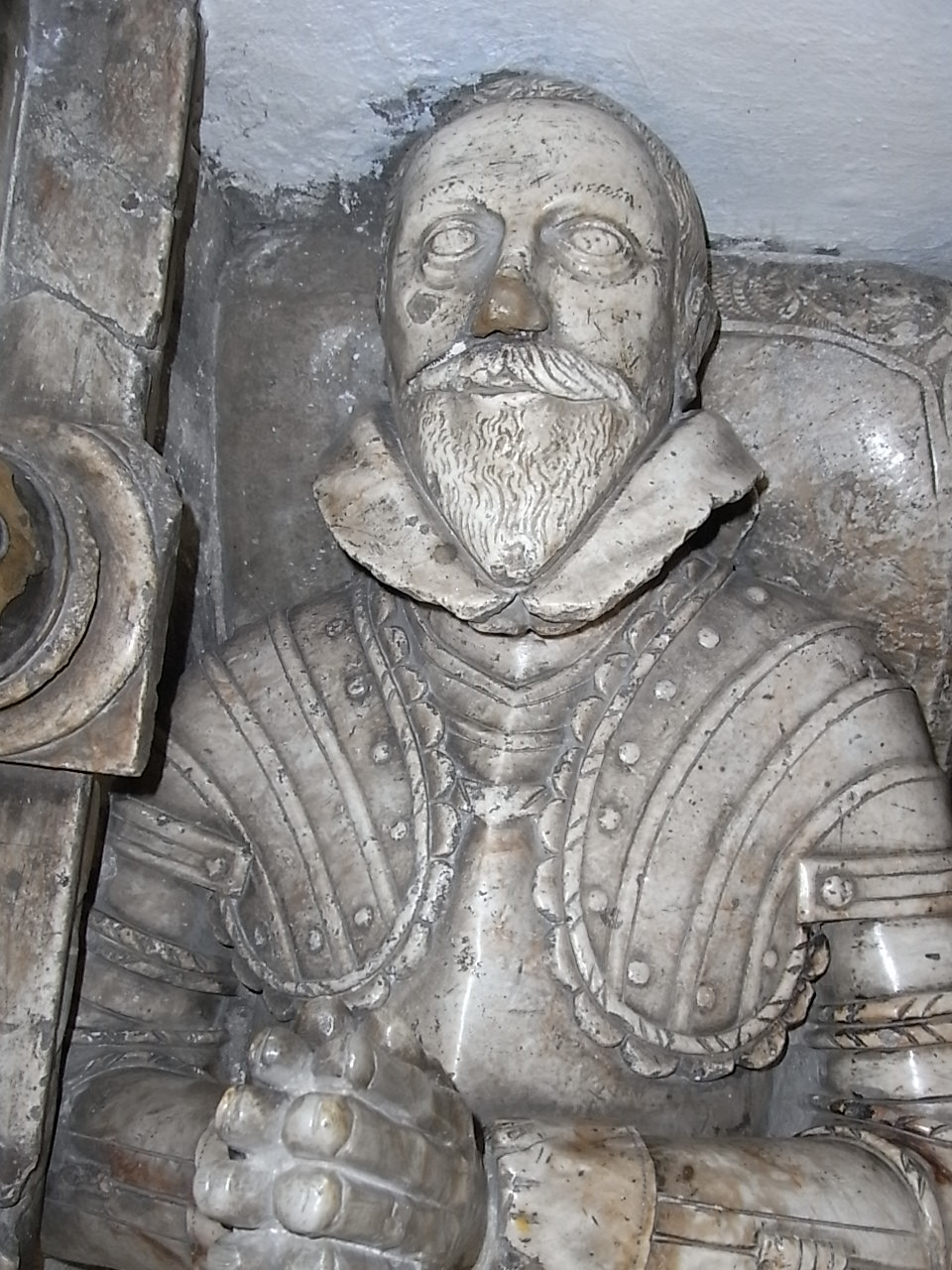
Effigy of Sir Richard Berkeley (d. 1604), The Gaunts Chapel, Bristol

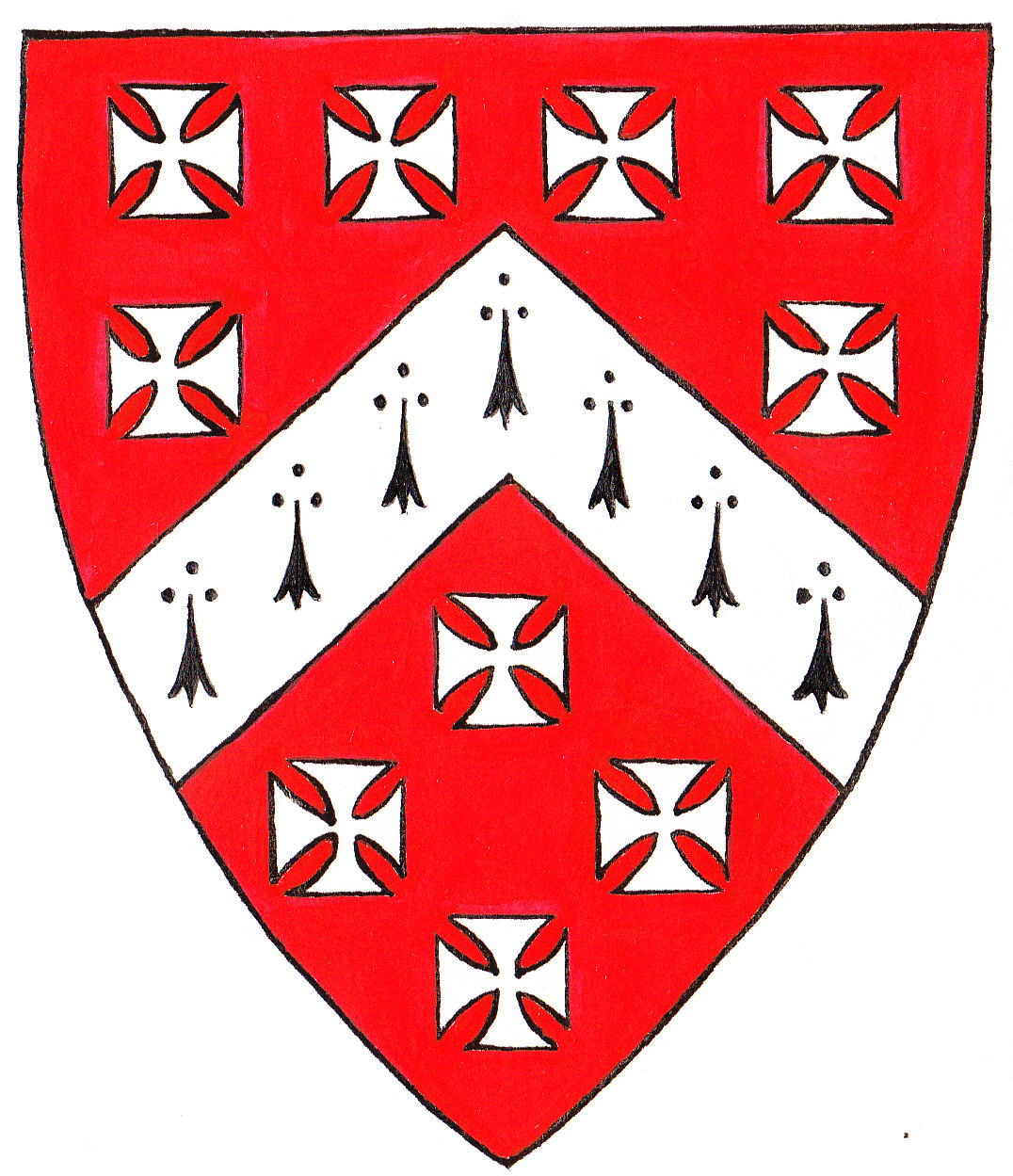
Arms of Berkeley of Stoke Gifford: Gules, a chevron ermine between ten crosses pattee argent. These arms may be seen in The Gaunts Chapel, Bristol and are the arms of the Barons Berkeley with the difference of a chevron ermine in place of a chevron argent

Sir Richard Berkeley (1531 – 1604) of Stoke Gifford, Gloucestershire was MP for Gloucestershire in 1604. He had previously served as Sheriff of Gloucestershire in 1564, and as Deputy Lieutenant of Gloucestershire. He was knighted by Queen Elizabeth I in 1568. In 1595 he was appointed Lieutenant of the Tower of London. In 1599 he was appointed custodian of Robert Devereux, 2nd Earl of Essex (d. 1601), who was kept under house arrest at Essex House in London. He died in 1604, whilst serving as MP, and was buried in The Gaunts Chapel, Bristol, where exists an effigy of him, which chapel had been founded in 1220 by Maurice de Gaunt (d. 1230), a member of the Berkeley family, and which stands opposite St Augustine's Abbey (after 1542 Bristol Cathedral), founded by a member of the Berkeley family of nearby Berkeley Castle.

== Background ==
He was born in 1531, the eldest son of Sir John Berkeley (d. 1546) of Stoke Gifford, Gloucestershire by Isabel Denys, a daughter of Sir William Denys (d. 1535) of Dyrham, Gloucestershire, by Anne Berkeley, daughter of Maurice Berkeley, de jure 3rd Baron Berkeley (1436–1506). As well as his mother's descent from the Barons Berkeley he was on the paternal side 7th in descent from Maurice de Berkeley (d. 1347, killed at the Siege of Calais), who had acquired the manor of Stoke Gifford in 1337, the second son of Maurice de Berkeley, 2nd Baron Berkeley (1271–1326).

In 1545/46, when Richard was aged 14, his father died from splinter wounds whilst on board a ship at Portsmouth, and by an addition to his father's will Richard was given in wardship to King Henry VIII (1509–1547). His mother, Isabel, married secondly, as his second wife, Arthur Porter (c.1505–1559) of Newent and Alvington, MP for Gloucestershire in November 1554, for the City of Gloucester in 1555 and for Aylesbury in 1559.

== Re-builds Stoke Park ==
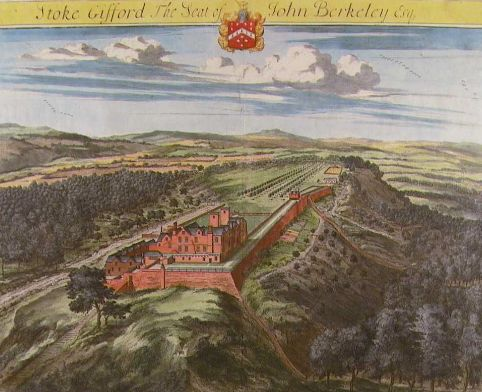
Stoke Gifford Hall (later "Stoke Park"), as re-built in 1533 by Sir Richard Berkeley. Drawn by Johannes Kip in 1707, when it belonged to John Symes Berkeley, Esquire, as stated by the caption above which displays the arms of Berkeley of Stoke Gifford. Published in Britannia Illustrata 1724 edition

In 1553, aged just 22 just after coming out of wardship and gaining possession of his inheritance, he rebuilt the manor house at Stoke Gifford in the late-Tudor style, which was subsequently known as The Dower House, Stoke Park. This construction was at about the same time his uncle Sir Maurice Denys (d. 1563) was rebuilding nearby Siston Court, which survives in original form. The house was built on a natural promontory, probably originally selected for its defensible position, converted into an artificial plateau. It was again rebuilt as the surviving version in 1750, in the Georgian style, by Berkeley's descendant Norborne Berkeley, 4th Baron Botetourt, and was inherited by his sister Elizabeth, Dowager Duchess of Beaufort, when it became the Dower House for Badminton House. It is situated about 1 1/2 miles south of the parish church of St. Michael, Stoke Gifford, and its parkland has now been intersected by the M32 motorway from which the present house of 1750, painted yellow, is a very prominent sight.

== Lands held ==
In 1564 he purchased the Gloucestershire manors of Stapleton, adjacent to the south, and Rendcomb, a considerable distance to the north, 5 miles north of Cirencester. Between 1563 and 1567 he sold the manor of Rockhampton, first acquired in 1354 by Sir Thomas (or Maurice) Berkeley of Uley (d.1361), to its several farmers-in-fee.

== Marriage and progeny ==
Berkeley married twice:

- Firstly to Elizabeth Read, daughter of William Read of Milton(or Mitton), Esq., by whom he had issue:
  - Henry Berkeley (died 1606), of Stoke Gifford, who married Mary (or Mirryell) Throckmorton, daughter of Thomas Throckmorton of Coughton Court, Warwickshire. He was father of Richard Berkeley (1579–1661), MP.
  - Elizabeth, (or Ellen) who married, as his first wife, Sir Thomas Throckmorton of Tortworth, Gloucestershire. She was mother of:
    - John Throckmorton(died young, c.1591, not to be confused with John Throckmorton (1572–1623) MP for Gloucestershire 1601 and 1604, on the latter occasion after winning a by-election for the seat vacated by the death of Richard Berkeley in the same year.)
    - Sir William Throckmorton, 1st Baronet (c.1579–1628), of Tortworth.
  - Mary
  - Anne who married Hugh Lygon (d. 1599 at Hanley Castle, Worcestershire)
  - Dorothy
- Secondly Eleanor Jermy, daughter of Sir Robert Jermy and widow of Robert Rowe, father of Sir Thomas Roe, ambassador. Sir Richard Berkeley's grandson Richard Berkeley (1579–1661) of Stoke Gifford married Mary Roe/Rowe (1579-1615), the daughter of Robert Rowe.

== Death and burial ==
He died on 26 April 1604, as his monument in The Gaunt's Chapel, Bristol, records. He was replaced on 30 May 1604 as one of the pair of MP's for Gloucestershire by John Throckmorton (1572–1623), of Lypiatt, whose parentage is unknown, but who was alive in 1611 as recorded in the proceedings of the House of Commons, and should not therefore be confused with his grandson John Throckmorton of Tortworth who died c.1591 as a boy.

== Effigy in The Gaunts Chapel ==
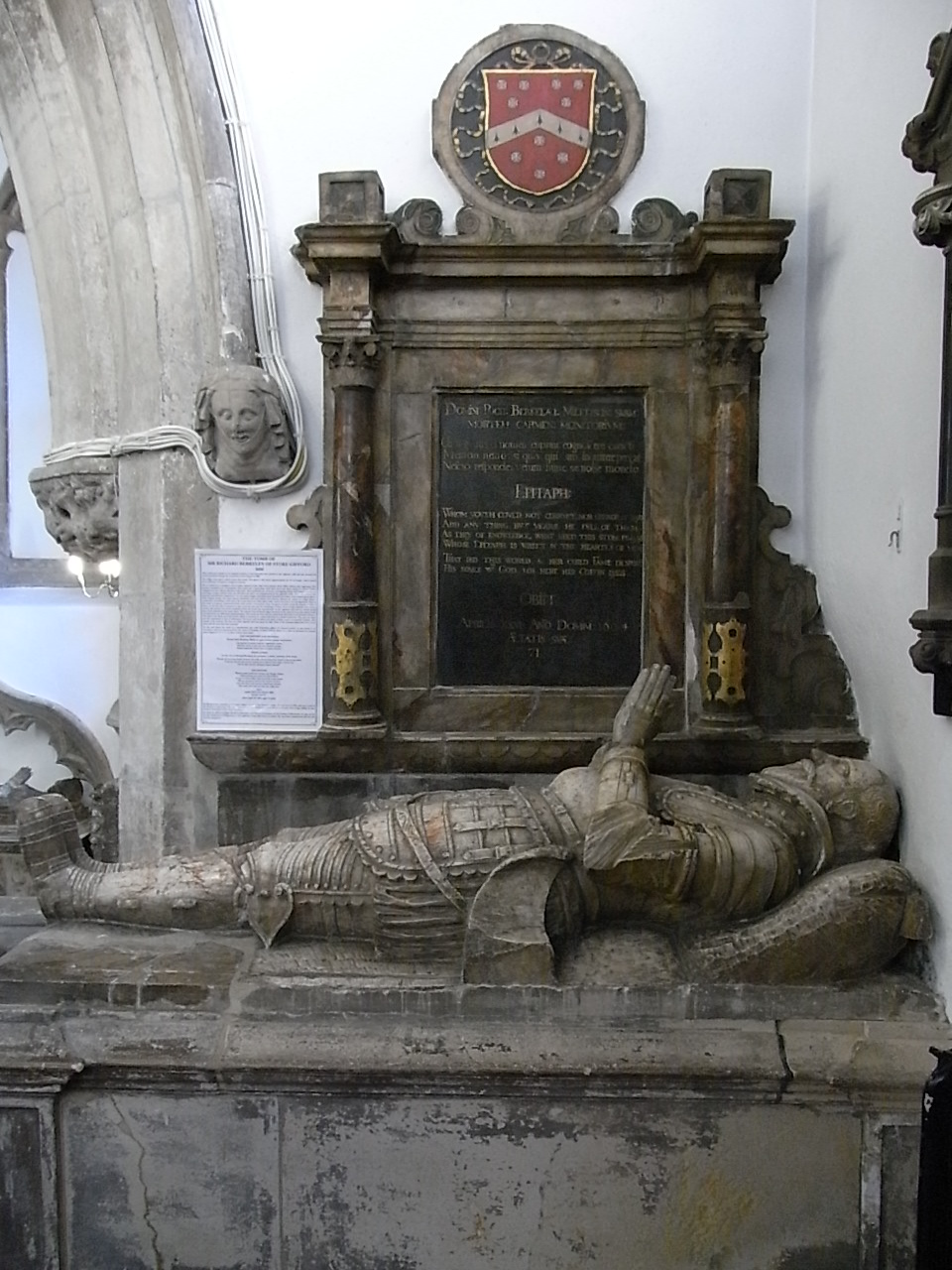
Monument and effigy of Sir Richard Berkeley (d. 1604) of Stoke Gifford, in The Gaunts Chapel, Bristol

1892 drawing of effigy of Sir Richard Berkeley (d. 1604) of Stoke Gifford, in The Gaunts Chapel, Bristol

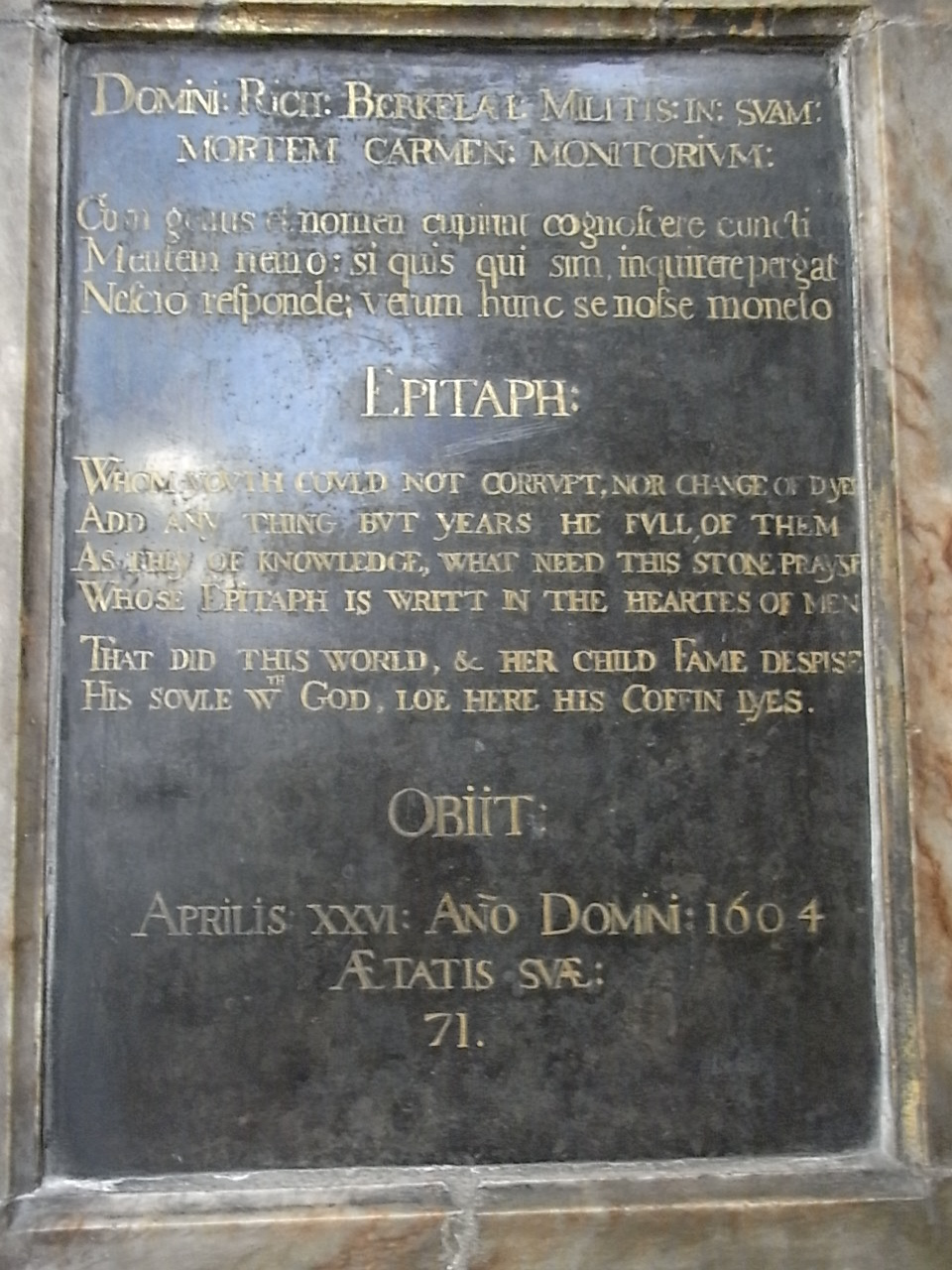
Epitaph to Sir Richard Berkeley (d. 1604) above his effigy in the Gaunt's Chapel, Bristol

The recumbent effigy of Sir Richard Berkeley is situated to the immediate right hand side on entering The Gaunt's Chapel, Bristol. He is dressed in plate-armour, with his hands placed together in prayer pointed heavenwards. The effigy probably had originally an elaborate sculpted canopy above it, which has now been lost, following the repositioning of the effigy to its current location against a wall. On an entablature on the wall behind the effigy, surmounted by the arms of Berkeley of Stoke Gifford (Gules, a chevron ermine between ten crosses pattee argent), is the following Latin inscription:

'Domini : Rich : Berkelaei : Militis : in : suam : mortem : carmen : monitorium : Cum genus et nomen capiunt cognoscere cuncti mentem nemo : si quis qui sim inquirere pergat nescio responde : verum hunc se nosse moneto'

Translated into English:

“...Of the lord Richard de Berkeley, knight, in his death, a song of those admonishing: Though all men may desire to know my name and race, yet no man may desire to know my mind. If any one should take up the enquiry as to who I am, reply I know not, but let that man be advised to know himself”

His epitaph follows:

Whom youth could not corrupt, nor change of dayes
Add anything but years, he, full of them
As they of knowledge, what need this stone prayse
Whose epitaph is writt in the heartes of men
That did this world and her child Fame despise
His soule w.th (with) God, loe here his coffin lyes

Obiit : Aprilis : xxvi : Ano. Domini : 1604 Aetatis suae 71
(Trans.: "He died the 26th of April in the year of Our Lord 1604, 71 (years) of age")

== Sources ==
- Barker, W.R. St Mark's or The Mayor's Chapel, Bristol, Formerly called the Church of the Gaunts. Bristol, 1892, pp. 146–8
- Evans, Rev. D.R., A History of Stoke Gifford, 1958. Extracts reproduced in: Kerton, Adrian (ed.), History of Stoke Gifford, 2005 (www.sbarch.org.uk)
- Smyth, John, The Lives of the Berkeleys, Lords of the Honour, Castle and Manor of Berkeley, in the County of Gloucester, from 1066 to 1618. First published 1618. (Main source of Barker, W.R.)
- Maclean, Sir John (ed.), The Visitation of the County of Gloucester Taken in the Year 1623 by Henry Chitty and John Phillipot, London, 1885, pp. 8–9, "Barkley" (contains errors)
- Berkeley genealogy website

Parliament of England
Preceded by John Throckmorton; Sir Edward Wynter	Member of Parliament for Gloucestershire; 1604; With: Sir Thomas Berkeley	Succeeded by Sir Thomas Berkeley; John Throckmorton
