= Peter Ball (barrister) =

English lawyer and courtier

Sir Peter Ball (died 1680) was an English landowner, barrister, and courtier who sat in the House of Commons in 1626, 1628/1629, and briefly in 1640. A royalist during the English Civil Wars, he was attorney general to Queen Henrietta Maria.

Ball was the son of Giles Ball of Mamhead, Devon. He was called to the bar from the Middle Temple in 1623 and became recorder of Exeter. He was elected as one of the two Members of Parliament for Tiverton in 1626 and was re-elected in 1628. He sat until 1629 when King Charles decided to rule without parliament for eleven years. In 1636, he became an associate to the bench.

Ball's father bought the Mamhead estate from the adventurer Sir Peter Carew (1514–1575). After inheriting the property, Ball began to build a new Mamhead House, replacing an older one.

In April 1640, Ball was re-elected as one of the members for Tiverton in the Short Parliament, which sat from 13 April to 5 May of that year. He then became attorney-general to Queen Henrietta Maria and was Lent reader in 1641. He was knighted at Oxford on 7 October 1643 and was awarded the degree of Doctor of Civil Law by the University of Oxford on 19 February 1644.

Ball died in 1680 and was buried at Mamhead on 4 September 1680.

Ball married Ann Cooke, daughter of Sir William Cooke, of Gloucestershire. They had seventeen children including William the astronomer, Peter the physician and Robert Ball, the MP.

== Arms ==
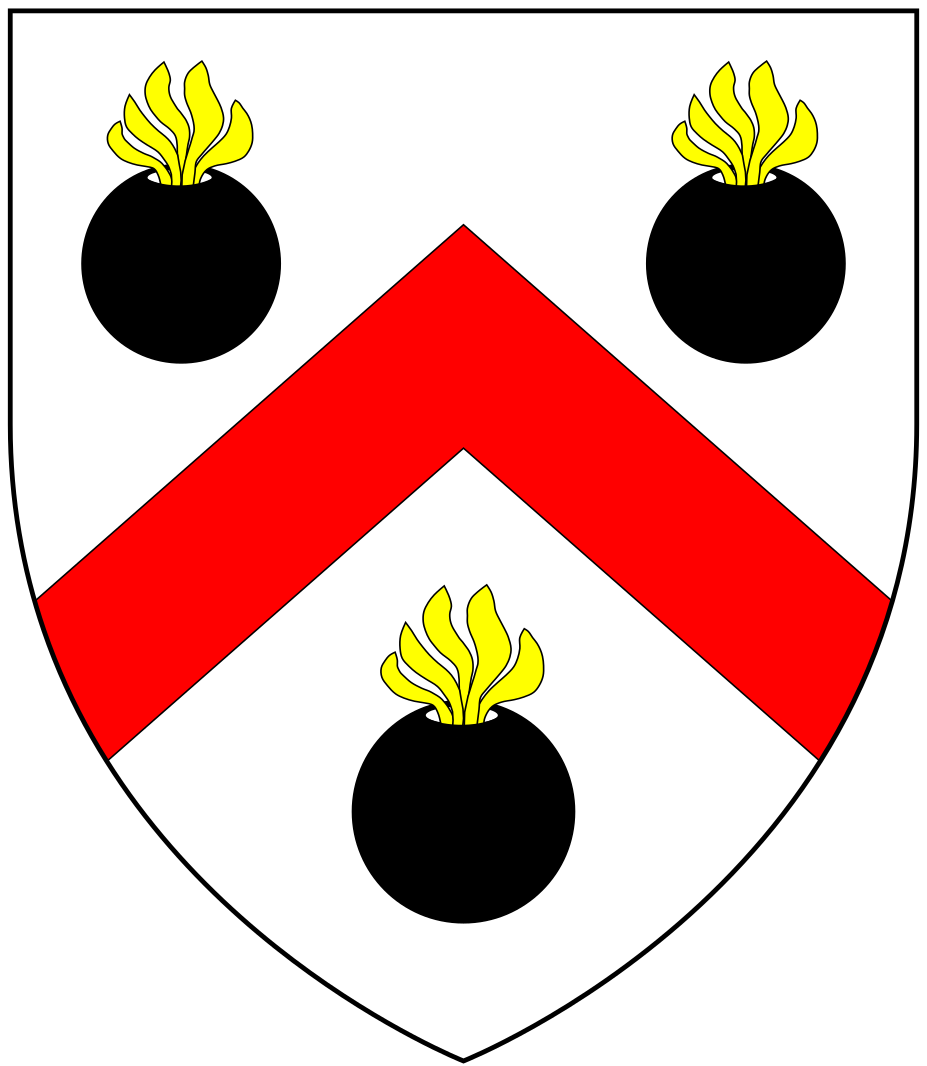
Arms of Ball of Mamhead

The canting coat of arms of the head of the Ball family of Mamhead, Devon, is blazoned: Argent a chevron gules between three fire balls proper.

Parliament of England
Preceded by Sir Rowland St John; John Francis	Member of Parliament for Tiverton; 1626–1629; With: John Drake 1626; John Bluett 1628–1629	Parliament suspended until 1640
Vacant Parliament suspended since 1629	Member of Parliament for Tiverton; 1640; With: Peter Sainthill	Succeeded by Peter Sainthill; George Hartnall
