= High Sheriff of Gloucestershire =

List of Sheriffs in Gloucestershire

This is a list of Sheriffs and High Sheriffs of Gloucestershire, who should not be confused with the Sheriffs of the City of Gloucester.

The High Sheriff is the oldest secular office under the Crown (in England and Wales the office previously known as sheriff was retitled High Sheriff on 1 April 1974). Formerly the Sheriff was the principal law enforcement officer in the county but over the centuries most of the responsibilities associated with the post have been transferred elsewhere or are now defunct, so that the High Sheriff's functions are now largely ceremonial. The High Sheriff changes every March.

As of 2006, the Sheriff's territory or bailiwick is covered by the administrative areas of Gloucestershire County Council and of South Gloucestershire District Council. Sir Robert Atkyns, the historian of Gloucester, writing in 1712 stated that no family had produced more Sheriffs of this county than Denys.

== Sheriffs ==
=== 11th and 12th centuries ===
- 1071–c. 1082: Roger de Pitres (Roger of Gloucester)
- c. 1082–1096 Durand of Gloucester (brother of Roger, died 1096)
- 1097–1121 Walter de Gloucester (nephew of Durand, son of Roger, retired bef. 1129 to become monk)
- 1121–c. 1129: Miles FitzWalter de Gloucester (son of Walter, died 1143)
- ?–1155: Roger Fitzmiles, 2nd Earl of Hereford (son of Miles, died 1155)
- 1155–1157: Walter de Hereford (brother of Roger, died c.1159 on crusade)
- 1157–1163: William de Beauchamp
- 1164–1167: William Pypard
- 1168–1171: Gilbert Pypard
- 1171–1175: Ralph fitzStephen (Rad'us (Ralph) son of Stephen)
- 1175–1189: William fitzStephen (William son of Stephen)
- 1190–1195 William Marescallus (William Marshall)
- 1196–1199: Herbert son of Herbert

=== 13th century ===
- 1199–1206: Willium Marescallus
- 1207–1208: Richard de Muegros
- 1209: Gérard d'Athée
- 1210–1215: Engelard de Cigogné
- 1216–1220: Ralph Musard
- 1220-1220: Sir Peter of Edgeworth
- 1220–1224: Ralph Musard
- 1225–1230: William Putot
- 1230-1230: Sir Peter of Edgeworth
- 1230–1231: William Putot
- 1232–1234: Henry of Bath
- 1234–1236: William Talbot
- 1237–1238: Thurstan de Dispenser
- 1239–1245: John son of Geoffrey
- 1246–1250: Robert Walerand
- 1251–1252: John de Fleminge
- 1253–1256: Adam de Hittested
- 1257–1258: William de Lessberrow
- 1259: Robert de Maysy
- 1260–1262: John de Brun
- 1263–1265: Matheus Werill
- 1266–1269: Reginald de Acle
- 1269–1271: Pierre de Champvent
- 1271–1278: Ralph Musard
- 1280: Sir Richard de la Riviere
- 1281–1284: Walter de Stuchesley
- 1285–1287: Roger de Lakington
- 1288–1289: Geoffrey de Mandiacre
- 1290–1292: Fulco de Locy
- 1293–1298: Fulco de Locy and Thomas de Gardinis
- 1299: John de Langley (1st term)

=== 14th century ===
- 1300–1301: Richard Talbot
- 1302: John de Newtown
- 1303–1307: Thomas de Gardinis
- 1308: John de Langley (2nd term)
- 1309–1310: Sir Nicholas de Kyngeston and John de Aunsley
- 1311–1312: John de Aunsley and Sir John de Acton (jointly)
- 1313–1314: Nicholas de Bathon, Sir William Mansel (jointly)
- 1315–1318: Sir Richard de la Riviere
- 1319–1322: John de Hampton
- 1323: vacant
- 1324–1326: Sir William Tracy of Toddington, jointly with John Bermandsel
- 1327–1329: Thomas Rodberg
- 1330: William Gamage and Thomas Rodberg
- 1331–1332: Sir Thomas Berkeley of Cubberle
- 1333–1337: Richard de Foxcot
- 1338: Thomas Berkeley de Cubberley and Richard de Foxcot
- 1339–1340: Thomas Berkeley
- 1341: Walter Dastin
- 1342–50: Sir Simon Basset
- 1351: Walter de Dastin jointly with Ph. Marachsl
- 1352–1353: John de Weston
- 1354: William de Ledene
- 1355: Sir Thomas Berkeley of Cubberle jointly with William Ledene
- 1356: Sir Thomas Berkeley of Cubberle
- 1257–1361: Robert de Herdesle
- 1362–1364: Sir Thomas Moigne
- 1364–1368: John Tracy
- 1369–1370: John Pointz
- 1371: Sir John Tracy, 38th Edward III, great-great-grandson of William (1324)
- 1372: John de Clifford
- 1373: Thomas de Ocle
- 1374: John Joce
- 1375: Nicholas Berkeley of Dursley
- 1376: Peter de Veel
- 1377: Thomas Bradwell
- 1378: John Joce and Peter de Chavent
- 1379: John Tracy of Toddington, grandson of John (1363–1368)
- 1380: Ralph Waleys
- 1381: Thomas Bradwell
- 1382: Sir John Thorp
- 1383: Sir Thomas FitzNichol of Hull alias Hill and Nympsfield
- 1384: Ralph Wallery (or Waleys)
- 1385: Thomas Berkeley of Coberley and Stoke Orchard (1st term)
- 1386: Thomas Burgh
- 1387: Thomas Bradwell
- 1388: Thomas Berkeley of Coberley and Stoke Orchard (2nd term)
- 1389: Laurence Seabrook
- 1390: Thomas Burgh
- 1391: Sir Maurice Russell of Dyrham
- 1392: Henry de la River
- 1393: Sir John Berkeley of Beverston Castle
- 1394: Sir Gilbert Denys of Siston
- 1395: William Tracy of Toddington, son of John (1379)
- 1396: Sir Maurice Russell of Dyrham
- 1397: Robert Poyntz
- 1398: John Berkeley of Beverston Castle
- 1399: John Browning of Melbury and Leigh

=== 15th century ===
- 1400: Henry de la River
- 1401: Sir Maurice Russell of Dyrham
- 1402: Sir Robert Whittington
- 1403–1404: William Beauchamp of Powick, Worcs.
- 1405: John Grendore
- 1406: Sir Maurice Russell of Dyrham
- 1407: Sir Robert Whittington
- 1408: Richard Mawarden of Sodbury
- 1409: Alex Clivedon
- 1410: William Wallwine
- 1411: John Greyndore
- 1412: William Beauchamp of Powick, Worcs.
- 1413: Sir John Berkeley of Beverston Castle
- 1414–15: John Greville of Campden
- 1418: William Tracy, son of William (1395)
- 1419: William Bishopston
- 1420: John Brugg
- 1421–1422: John Wilcotes
- 1423: John Panfote of Crickhowell Castle and Hasfield
- 1424: John Blacket
- 1425: Stephen Haytfield
- 1426: John Greville of Campden
- 1427: John Panfote of Crickhowell Castle and Hasfield
- 1428: Sir Guy de Whittington
- 1429: Robert Andrew
- 1439: Egidius Brigge (Giles Brugge, 4th Baron Chandos)
- 1431: Sir Maurice Berkeley of Beverstone
- 1432: Stephen Haytfield
- 1433: John Towerton
- 1434: Sir Guy de Whittington
- 1435: John Panfote of Crickhowell Castle and Hasfield
- 1436–1437: Maurice Berkeley
- 1438: John Beauchamp
- 1439: William Stafford
- 1440–1441: John Stourton
- 1442: John Botiller
- 1443: Robert Leversey
- 1444–45: William Tracy, 22 and 23rd Henry VI, son of William (1418)
- 1446: William Gifford
- 1447: John Botiller
- 1448: Henry Clifford
- 1449: John Trye
- 1450: John Gise
- 1451: William Tracy, son of William (1442 and 1443)
- 1452: James Clifford
- 1453: John Vele
- 1454: Giles Brugge, 4th Baron Chandos
- 1455: John Vise
- 1456: Walter Devereux
- 1457: Sir John Barre of Barr's Court
- 1458: Edward Hungerford
- 1459: Nicholas Latymer
- 1460: Thomas Hungerford
- 1461: Sir John Greville
- 1462: Maurice Denys of Alveston
- 1463: Maurice Denys of Alveston
- 1464: Sir Maurice Berkeley of Betteshorne, Hants
- 1465: Edward Hungerford
- 1466: John Huggford
- 1467: John Newton
- 1468: Sir John Greville
- 1469: Sir Robert Poyntz of Acton Court, Iron Acton
- 1470: John Cassy of Adesburye
- 1471–1473: Richard Beauchamp
- 1474: Humphrey Forster
- 1475: John Botiller
- 1476: Thomas Whittington
- 1477: Thomas Norton
- 1478: Sir Robert Poyntz of Acton Court, Iron Acton
- 1479: Thomas Baynham of Clearwell
- 1480: Edward Langley
- 1481: Walter Denys of Alveston
- 1482: Jo. St Lowe
- 1483: Sir Robert Poyntz of Acton Court, Iron Acton
- 1483: Alex. Baynam
- 1484: John Hudleston
- 1485: William Berkley and Robert Poyntz
- 1485: Robert Poyntz
- 1486: John St Low and John Welsh
- 1487: Thomas Morton (or Norton)
- 1488: Christopher Throckmorton
- 1489: Thomas Hungerford
- 1490: Richard Pole
- 1491: Robert Miles
- 1492: Sir Walter Denys of Alveston
- 1493: Edward Berkley
- 1494: John Whitington
- 1495: Sir Robert Poyntz of Acton Court, Iron Acton
- 1496: Richard Pole of Coats
- 1497–1498: Alexander Baynam
- 1499: Giles Brugge, 6th Baron Chandos

=== 16th century ===
- 1500: John Huddlestone
- 1501: Sir Robert Poyntz of Acton Court, Iron Acton
- 1502: Richard Pole
- 1503–1504: Alex Baynam
- 1505: Giles Genel
- 1506: John Botiller
- 1507: Edward Tame
- 1508: John Pannefot
- 1509: Anthony Poyntz
- 1509: Maurice de Berkeley
- 1510: Thomas Poyntz
- 1511: Christopher Baynam
- 1512: Robert Morton
- 1513: Sir William Tracy of Todington, 5th of Henry VIII, son of William (1449)
- 1514: Sir William Kingston of Painswick
- 1515: Maurice de Berkeley
- 1516: Alex Baynam
- 1517: Christopher Baynam
- 1518: John Whittington
- 1519: Sir William Denys of Dyrham
- 1520: Egidius Tame
- 1521: Thomas Poyntz
- 1522: Thomas Berkeley, 5th Lord Berkeley
- 1523: Anthony Poyntz
- 1524: Sir Edmund Tame of Fairford
- 1525: Sir Edward Wadham (died 1548) of Pole Anthony, Tiverton, Devon and Tormarton, Gloucestershire.
- 1526: John Walsh
- 1527: Sir William Denys of Dyrham
- 1528: Anthony Poyntz
- 1529: William Throgmorton
- 1530: John Walsh
- 1531: Sir Edward Wadham (died 1548) of Pole Anthony, Tiverton, Devon and Tormarton, Gloucestershire.
- 1532: Walter Denys of Dyrham
- 1533: Sir Anthony Kingston (1st term)
- 1534: Richard Legon
- 1535: John Walsh
- 1536: John St Lo
- 1537: Edward Tame
- 1538: Sir Walter Denys of Dyrham
- 1539: Sir Nicholas Poyntz of Iron Acton
- 1540: John Walsh
- 1541: Sir Edward Wadham (died 1548) of Pole Anthony, Tiverton, Devon and Tormarton, Gloucestershire.
- 1542: Edward Tame
- 1543: Sir Walter Denys of Dyrham
- 1544: George Baynham
- 1545: Sir Nicholas Poyntz of Iron Acton
- 1546: Nicholas Wykes of Doddington
- 1547: Miles Partridge
- 1548: Arthur Porter of Newent
- 1549: John Brydges, 1st Baron Chandos of Sudeley
- 1550: Sir Anthony Kingston (2nd term)
- 1551: Sir Walter Denys of Dyrham
- 1552: Hugh Denys of Pucklechurch
- 1553: Sir Anthony Hungerford of Down Ampney
- 1554: Nicholas Wykes of Doddington
- 1555: Sir Walter Denys of Dyrham
- 1556: Richard Pauncefoot
- 1557: Richard Brayne
- 1557: Sir Richard Tracy, 4th of Mary I, son of Paul (1578)
- 1558: Sir Thomas Throckmorton of Coss Court
- 1558: Sir Nicholas Arnold of Highnam
- 1559: Richard Tracy of Stanway, 2nd of Elizasbeth I, son of William (1512)
- 1560: Nicholas Walsh
- 1561: George Huntley of Frowcester
- 1562: William Reede or Read, snr
- 1564: Sir Richard Berkeley (died 1604) of Stoke Gifford.
- 1565: Sir Giles Poole of Sapperton
- 1566: William Palmer
- 1567: William (John?) Hungerford
- 1568: Robert Brane
- 1569: Nicholas Poyntz
- 1570: Richard Baynham
- 1571: Thomas Smith
- 1572: John Higford
- 1573: Robert Straunge
- 1574: Thomas Porter
- 1575: Thomas Wye
- 1576: Walter Campton
- 1577: Thomas Chester
- 1578: Paul Tracy, Baronet Tracy of Stanway, 20th of Elizabeth, son of Richard (1560)
- 1579: William Read
- 1580: Richard Pate of Minsterworth
- 1581: Sir Thomas Porter
- 1582: Thomas Baynham
- 1583: Thomas Smith of Nibley
- 1584: Anthony Hungerford
- 1585: John Higford of Dixton
- 1586: Paul Tracy of Stanway
- 1587: Sir Thomas Throckmorton
- 1588: Sir Henry Poole of Sapperton
- 1589: Thomas Lucy
- 1590: William Dutton
- 1591: John Pointz
- 1592: William Chester
- 1593: Sir John Danvers of Cirencester
- 1594: Joseph Benham
- 1595: Henry Winston
- 1596: John Chamberlain of Prestbury
- 1597: John Hungerford of Down Ampney
- 1598: Edward Wynter of Lydney
- 1599: George Huntley

=== 17th century ===
- 1600: Sir Thomas Throckmorton
- 1601: William Dutton
- 1602: Thomas Baynham of Clearwell
- 1603: Sir Henry Poole of Sapperton
- 1604: Egridius (Giles) Read
- 1605: Sir Thomas Seymer of Button
- 1606: William Norwood of Leckhampton Court
- 1607: Sir Thomas Estcourt of Shipton Moyne, Wilts
- 1608: Thomas Woodruff and William Guise of Elmore
- 1609: Sir John Tracy of Toddington
- 1610: Paul Tracy (later Sir Paul Tracy, 1st Baronet)
- 1611: Robert Bathurst of Lechlade
- 1612: John Carter of Charlton
- 1613: William Kingston
- 1614: Richard Brent
- 1615: Henry Finch
- 1616: Ralph Cotton
- 1617: Thomas Chester from Knolle
- 1618: Richard Hill
- 1619: Philip Langley of Mangotsfield
- 1620: Sir Thomas Baker
- 1621: Thomas Thynne
- 1622: Thomas Hodges
- 1623: Richard Rogers
- 1624: John Dowle
- 1625: Sir William Sandys
- 1626: Thomas Nicholas of Stratton, near Cirencester
- 1627: Sir William Master of The Abbey, Cirencester
- 1628: Richard Tracy
- 1629: Henry Dennis of Pucklechurch
- 1630: Sir Ralph Dutton
- 1631: Sir George Winter
- 1632: Henry Poole
- 1633: Giles Fettiplace of Poulton, Wilts
- 1634: Edward Stephens
- 1635: William Leigh
- 1636: Richard Ducye
- 1636: Sir Miles Sandys of Brymsfield
- 1637: Sir Robert Pointz of Iron Acton
- 1638: John Codrington
- 1639: Sir Humphrey Tracy, 15th of Charles I, son of Richard (1560)
- 1640: Robert Pleidall
- 1641: Francis Creswick of Bristol
- 1642: Sir Baynham Throckmorton, 2nd Baronet
- 1643: Thomas Stephens
- 1644: Thomas Stephens
- 1645: John Fettiplace
- 1646: William Brown of Haresfield
- 1647: William Guise of Elmore (son of William, HS 1609)
- 1648: Sir Richard Brane
- 1648: John Browneinge
- 1649: John Dennis then William Dennis of Pucklechurch
- 1650: John Howe of Compton Abdale
- 1651: John Keite
- 1652: John Gostlett
- 1653: Richard Talbois
- 1654: Simon Bennett
- 1655: George Raymund
- 1657: John Bernard
- 1660: Sir William Dacy
- 1661: Sir Humphrey Hooke
- 1662: Thomas Estcourt
- 1663: William Cooke of Highnam, Gloucester
- 1664: Sir John Hanmer, 3rd Baronet
- 12 November 1665: Sir Richard Cocks, 1st Baronet
- 7 November 1666: Richard Whitmore
- 14 September 1667: William Dutton
- 6 November 1668: Sir Richard Ashfield, 2nd Baronet
- 11 November 1669: John Browning
- 4 November 1670: Sir Robert Cann, 1st Baronet
- 9 November 1671: Sir Thomas Stephens
- 11 November 1672: Henry Dennis, of Pucklechurch
- 12 November 1673: John Dowle, of Over
- 5 November 1674: Abraham Clark, of Flaxley
- 15 November 1675: Sir John Fust, 2nd Baronet
- 10 November 1676: Sir William Juxon, 1st Baronet
- 15 November 1677: Richard Jones
- 14 November 1678: Miles Sandes
- 13 November 1679: Thomas Smyth, of Stonehouse
- 4 November 1680: Sir Gabriel Low
- 1682: William Walls
- 1683: Robert Playdell
- 1684: Charles Jones
- 1685: Charles Hancock
- 1686: Sir Charles Winter
- 1687: Sir Thomas Cann
- 1688: Henry Hall of High Meadow
- 1689: John Chamberlayn replaced by James Stephens
- 1689: Sir Hele Hooke, 2nd Baronet
- 1690: William Dennis
- 1691: John de la Bere
- 1692: Andrew Barker
- 1692 (Mar–Nov): Samuel Barker of Fairford Park
- 1692–93: Sir Richard Cocks of Dumbleton
- 1694: Thomas Stephens of Lypiatt Park, Over (or Upper) Lypiatt
- 1695: Nathaniel Rydler
- 1696: Sir George Hanger of Driffield
- 1697: Walter Yate
- 1698: John Marriot
- 1699: Nathaniel Stephens

=== 18th century ===
- 1700: Thomas Chester
- 1701: Richard Haynes
- 1702: Samuel Eckley
- 1703: Sir Edward Fust, Bt
- 1704: William Heyward
- 1705: Edmund Chamberlayne
- 1706: Matthew Ducie Moreton
- 1707: Francis Windham
- 1707: William Trye
- 1708: Henry Wagstaffe
- 1709: Henry Sackeville
- 1710: William Batson
- 1711: George Smith of Nibley
- 1712: Thomas Weston
- 1713: Lawford Cole
- 1714: William Whittington
- 1715: William Kinscote
- 1716: Sir Abraham Elton, 1st Baronet
- 1717: Edmund Reginald Bray of Barrington
- 1718: Sir Edward Fust, 4th Baronet, of Hill
- 1719: Christopher Bond
- 1720: William Saunders of Clifton
- 1721: John Dowle of Over
- 1722: William Blathwayt
- 1723: Thomas Warner
- 1724: Samuel Roach of Sheerhampton
- 1725: Walter Sandys
- 1726: John Sampson
- 1727: Sir Robert Cann, 4th Baronet
- 1728: Robert Cocks of Dumbleton
- 1729: Joseph Small of Buthrop
- 1730: Samuel Sheppard of Avening
- 1731: Samuel Mee
- 1732: Silvanus Lysons
- 1732: Edmund Waller
- 1733: Reginald Winyatt of Stanton
- 1734: Richard Marriett of Preston
- 1735: John Gladwin
- 1736: Sir George Smith
- 1737: William Robins of Crum Hall
- 1738: Ambrose Baldwin
- 1739: William Giles
- 1740: Edward Rogers of Newent
- 1741: William Holbrow
- 1742: Samuel Hawker of Rodborough
- 1743: William Tayloe
- 1744: Thomas Snell of Upton St Leonards
- 1745: Daniel Ady the younger
- 1746: William Bagehot Delabere
- 1747: John Harding of Ozleworth
- 1748: Robert Ball
- 1749: Thomas Winstone of Stapleton
- 1750: Henry Toy Bridgeman of Brinck Narth
- 1751: Richard Hill of Yate
- 1751: John Beale
- 1753: Thomas Kemble of Tewkesbury
- 1754: Thomas Ingram of Coln Saint Aldwyn
- 1755: James Lamb of Fairford
- 1756: Charles Wyndham of Clowerwall in the Forest of Dean
- 1757: Reginald Pindar Lygon of Kemply
- 1758: Thomas Jones of South Cerney
- 1759: Samuel Hayward of Sandhurst
- 1760: Sir Onesiphorus Paul, 1st Baronet of Rodborough
- 1761: John de la Field Phelps
- 1762: Peter Hancock of Twyning
- 1763: Samuel Paul of Rodborough
- 1764: Giles Nash of Stonehouse
- 1765: Robert Dobbins Yate of Bromsberrow
- 1766: William Dallaway
- 1767: Edmund Probyn, of Newland
- 1768: John Guise, later Sir John Guise, 1st Baronet of Highnam Court, Churcham
- 1769: William Singleton of Norton
- 1770: George Smith of North Nibley
- 1771: Thomas Master of the Abbey, Cirencester
- 1772: Edmund Waller of Farmington
- 1773: Joseph Pyrke of Little Dean
- 1774: Henry Wyatt of Stroud
- 1774: Thomas Estcourt of Estcourt House, Tetbury
- 1775: Sir George Smith, Bt, later Sir George Pauncefote-Bromley, 2nd Baronet of Carswalls
- 1776: Henry Lippincott, later Sir Henry Lippincott, 1st Baronet of Stoke Bishop
- 1777: William Hayward Winstone of Oldbury
- 1778: Edward Samson of Henbury
- 1779: Charles Coxe of Hanbury replaced by James Dutton of Sherborne
- 1780: Sir George Onesiphorus Paul, 2nd Baronet
- 1781: John Morris
- 1782: Charles Hayward
- 1783: Joseph Roberts
- 1784: Giles Greenaway
- 1785: John Niblett, of Gloucester
- 1786: Charles Cox of Kemble
- 1787: Samuel Richardson of Newent
- 1788: Nicholas Smith of North Nibley
- 1789: George Miller, of Ozleworth
- 1790: Robert Blagdon Hale
- 1791: Michael Hicks Beach of Beverstone Castle
- 1792: John Embury of Twyning
- 1793: Christopher B. Codrington of Dodington Park
- 1794: Isaac Elton of Stapleton
- 1795: Samuel Edwards of Botham Lodge
- 1796: Samuel Peach Peach of Upper Torkington
- 1796: ?Henry Cruger jnr of Bristol and Westonhouse, Bath
- 1797: William Tindall of North Cerney
- 1798: Thomas Vernon Delphin of Eyford
- 1799: John Elwas of Colesbourne

=== 19th century ===
- 5 February 1800: Thomas Smith, of Stapleton
- 11 February 1800: Charles Hanbury-Tracy, of Toddington
- 12 February 1801: Thomas Smith, of Stapleton
- 18 February 1801: John Browne, of Salperton
- 3 February 1802: James Musgrave, of Barnsley Park
- 3 February 1803: Sir Samuel Wathen, of Woodchester
- 1 February 1804: Nathaniel Clifford, of Frampton-on-Severn
- 6 February 1805: Edmund John Chamberlayne, of Maugersbury
- 1 February 1806: William Lawrence, of Shurdington
- 4 February 1807: Thomas Baggot Delabere, of Southam
- 11 February 1807: Charles Evans, of High Grove
- 3 February 1808: Sir Thomas Crawley-Boevey, 3rd Baronet, of Flaxley Abbey
- 6 February 1809: John Hodder Moggridge, of Dymock
- 31 January 1810: Paul Wathen, of Lypiatt Park
- 8 February 1811: Robert Gordon, of Kemble House
- 24 January 1812: Sir William Hicks, 7th Baronet, of Witcomb Park
- 10 February 1813: Charles Pole, of Wick Hill House
- 4 February 1814: John Hooper Holder, of North Cerney
- 7 March 1814: Sir Charles Cockerell, 1st Baronet, of Sezincote House
- 13 February 1815: William Morris, of Sevenhampton
- 1816: Daniel John Niblett of Harefield
- 1817: Sir Henry Cann Lippincott of Stoke Bishop
- 1818: David Ricardo of Gatcombe Park
- 1819: Edward Sheppard of the Ridge
- 1820: Sir Edwin Bayntun-Sandys, Bt
- 1821: William Miller, of Ozleworth
- 1822: Stephen John Welch Fletcher-Welch
- 1823: John Smyth, of Stapleton
- 1824: Thomas John Lloyd-Baker of Hardwicke Court
- 1825: Sir James Musgrave, 9th Baronet of Barnsley Park
- 1826: Robert Hale Blagdon Hale
- 1827: George Bragge Prowse Prinn
- 1828: Fiennes Trotman of Siston Court
- 1829: William Blathwayte of Dyrham Park
- 1830: David Ricardo of Gatcombe Park
- 1831: Sir Thomas Crawley-Boevey, 3rd Baronet, of Flaxley Abbey
- 1832: Robert Canning, of Hartpury
- 1833: Henry Elwes, of Colesbourne
- 1834: Josiah Gist, of Wormington Grange was initially named, but was replaced by Harry Edmund Waller, of Farmington, due to Gist's death
- 1835: Henry Wenman Newman, of Clifton
- 1836: Samuel Gist Gist, of Wormington Grange
- 1837: Henry Norwood Trye, of Leckhampton Court
- 1838: Edward Sampson, of Henbury
- 1839: Maynard Colchester, of Westbury-on-Severn
- 1840: Sir Michael Hicks-Beach, 8th Baronet, of Williamstrip Park
- 1841: James Woodbridge Walters, of Barnwood House
- 1842: Thomas Henry Kingscote, of Kingscote
- 1843: Robert Stayner Holford, of Westonbirt House
- 1844: Joseph Yorke, of Forthampton Court
- 1845: Edmund Hopkinson, of Edgworth House
- 1846: George Bengough, of Newland
- 1847: Thomas Barwick Lloyd Baker, of Hardwicke Court
- 1848: William Capel, of the Grove, Painswick
- 1849: William Philip Price, of Tibberton Court, son of Wm Price (1819)
- 1850: Thomas Gambier Parry, of Highnam Court
- 1851: William Dent, of Sudeley Castle
- 1852: Winchcomb Henry Howard Hartley, of Sodbury
- 1853: John Raymond Raymond Barker, of Fairford Park
- 1854: John Henry Elwes, of Colesbourne House, near Northleach
- 1855: Corbett Holland Corbett, of Admington Hall, near Stratford-on-Avon
- 1856: Sir Charles Rushout Rushout, 2nd Bt of Sezincote House
- 1857: Richard Rogers Coxwell Rogers of Dowdeswell, near Cheltenham
- 1858: Thomas Beale Browne of Salperton Park, near Cheltenham
- 1859: John Coucher Dent, of Sudeley Castle, near Winchcombe
- 1860: William John Phelps of Chestal House, Dursley
- 1861: John Waddingham, of Guiting Grange, near Winchcombe
- 1862: Sir George Jenkinson, 11th Baronet, of Eastwood, near Berkeley
- 1863: Philip William Skynner Myles, of King's Weston, near Bristol
- 1864: Goodwin Charles Colquitt Craven, of Brockhampton Park, near Cheltenham
- 1865: John Altham Graham Clark, of Frocester, near Stonehouse
- 1866: Sir John Maxwell Steele-Graves, 4th Baronet
- 1867: Edward Sampson, of Hembury, near Bristol
- 1868: Hattil Foll, of Beckford Hall, near Tewkesbury
- 1869: James Fenton of Norton Hall, Mickleton, near Chipping Campden
- 1870: Robert Blagden Hale, of Alderley, near Wotton-under-Edge
- 1871: William Playne, of Longfords, Minchinhampton
- 1872: Sir William Vernon Guise, 4th Baronet of Elmore Court, near Gloucester
- 1873: Thomas Anthony Stoughton of Owlpen Park, near Dursley
- 1874: Sir Thomas Sebastian Bazley, 2nd Baronet of Hatherop Castle, Fairford
- 1875: Edmund Probyn, of Huntley Manor, near Gloucester
- 1876: Edmund Waller, of Farmington, near Northleach
- 1877: John Charles Bengough, of The Ridge, Wotton-under-Edge
- 1878: Thomas William Chester Master, of the Abbey, Cirencester
- 1879: Edward Rhys Wingfield, of Great Barrington, Burford
- 1880: Sir Gerald William Henry Codrington, 1st Baronet, of Dodington Park. Chipping Sodbury
- 1881: George William Blathwayt, of Dyrham Park, Bath
- 1882: Sir Thomas Hyde Crawley-Boevey, 5th Baronet of Flaxley Abbey, Mitcheldean
- 1883: Andrew Knowles, of New Court, Newent
- 1884: Henry Ingles Chamberlayne, of Maugersbury Manor, Stow-on-the-Wold
- 1885: Edmund Temple Godman, of Banks Fee, Moreton-in-Marsh
- 1886: Alfred Sartoris, of Abbott's Wood, Stow-on-the-Wold
- 1887: Sir Lionel Edward Darell, 5th Baronet, of Fretherne Court, near Stonehouse
- 1888: Sir William Marling, 2nd Baronet of Stanley Park, Stonehouse
- 1889: John Skipworth Gibbons, of Boddington Manor, near Cheltenham
- 1890: James Roberts West, of Alscott Park, near Stratford-on-Avon
- 1891: Edward Aldam Leatham of Misarden Park, Cirencester
- 1892: John Reginald Yorke, of Forthampton Court, Tewkesbury
- 1893: Sir William Francis George Guise, 5th Baronet, of Elmore Court, near Gloucester
- 1894: John Dearman Birchall, of Bowden Hall, near Gloucester
- 1895: Thomas Dyer-Edwardes, of Prinknash Park, Gloucester
- 1896: William Meath Baker, of Hasfield Court, Gloucester
- 1897: James Dugdale, of Sezincote House, Moreton-in-Marsh
- 1898: Granville Edwin Lloyd Baker, of Hardwicke Court, near Gloucester
- 1899: Robert Ingham Tidswell, of Haresfield Court, near Gloucester

=== 20th century ===
- 1900: Peter Stubs, of Blaisdon Hall, near Newnham-on-Severn
- 1901: Gardner Sebastian Bazley of Hatherop Castle, Fairford
- 1902: James Horlick, of Cowley Manor, Cheltenham
- 1903: Samuel Bruce, of Norton Hall, near Chipping Camden
- 1904: Benjamin St John Ackers, of Huntley Manor, near Gloucester
- 1905: Henry Dent-Brocklehurst, of Sudeley Castle, Winchcomb
- 1906: Hamilton Fane Gladwin, of Seven Springs, Cubberley, near Cheltenham
- 1907: Lieut.-Col. Fairfax Rhodes (1845–1928), of Brockhampton Park, Andoversford, RSO
- 1908: George Loyd Foster Harter, of Salperton Park, Hazleton
- 1909: Theodore Drayton Grimké-Drayton, of Clifford Manor, Cliffords Mesne, Newent
- 1910: Arthur Edmund Moss, of Leygore Manor, Northleach
- 1911: George Williams Lowsley Hoole Lowsley-Williams, of Chavenage, Tetbury
- 1912: Herbert Jenner Fust, of Hill Court, Falfield
- 1913: Lieut.-Col. Francis Henry, of Elmestree, Tetbury.
- 1914: William Augustus Rixon, of Turkdean Manor, Northleach
- 1915: Colin MacIver, of Blaisdon Hall, Longhope
- 1916: Philip Napier Miles of Kings Weston, Henbury
- 1917: Ernest Edward Turner, of Shipton Oliffe Mamor, Andoversford
- 1918: James Ernest Rawlins, of Syston Court, near Bristol,
- 1919: Captain Maynard Francis Colchester–Wemyss, of Broughtons, Newnham
- 1920: Colonel Sir Arthur Anstice, of The Old Grange, Dymock
- 1921: Lieut.-Col. Albert John Palmer, of Fairford Park, Fairford
- 1922: Edward Conder, of Conigree Court, Newent,
- 1923: Col. Sir Percival Scrope Marling, of Stanley Park, Stroud, Glos.
- 1924: Major Sir Lionel Edward Hamilton Marmaduke Darell, of Saul Lodge, Stonehouse, Glos.
- 1925: Sir Philip Stott, 1st Baronet, of Stanton Court, Broadway
- 1926: Sir Anselm William Edward Guise, 6th Baronet, of Elmore Court, near Gloucester
- 1927: Major Charles Penrhyn Ackers, of Huntley Manor, near Gloucester
- 1928: Lieut.-Col. Sir Gilbert Alan Hamilton Wills, of Batsford Park, Moreton-in-Marsh
- 1929: Lieut.-Col. Henry George Ricardo, of Gatcombe, Minchinhampton
- 1930: Francis Osmond Joseph Huntley, of Boxwell Court, Tetbury
- 1931: Sir Stanley Tubbs, Bt, of Wotton-under-Edge
- 1932: Major William John Paley Marling, of Great Rissington Manor, Bourton-on-the-Water
- 1933: Samuel Vestey, 2nd Baron Vestey, of Stowell Park, near Cheltenham
- 1934: Joseph Dillworth Crewdson, of Syde House, near Cheltenham
- 1935: Sidney Allen, of Moor Court, of Amberley
- 1936: Samuel Stanley Marling of Littleworth House, Amberley
- 1937: Arthur William Stanton, of Field Place, Stroud,
- 1938: Sir Christopher William Gerald Henry Codrington of Dodington, Chipping Sodbury
- 1939: Major John Henry Dent-Brocklehurst, of Sudeley Castle, Winchcomb
- 1940: Major and Brevet Lieut.-Col. Charles Edward Turner, of Old Down, Tockington, Bristol
- 1941: Lieut.-Gol. John Ralph Congreve Dent, of Olivers, Painswick
- 1942: Lieut.-Col. John Godman, of Banks Fee, Moreton-in-Marsh
- 1943: Sir Evan Gwynne Gwynne-Evans, 2nd Bt of Oakland's Park, Newnham
- 1944: Major Alexander Black Mitchell, of Poulton Priory, Fairford
- 1945: Stephen Mitchell of the Roseary, Cleeve Hill, Cheltenham
- 1946: Edwin Brassey of Copse Hill, Lower Slaughter, Cheltenham
- 1947: Captain Sir George Edward Stott, 2nd Bt. of Stanton Court (Glos.), via Broadway
- 1948: Lieut-Col. Ardern Arthur Hulme Beaman, of Kingscote Grange, Tetbury
- 1949: Sir Walter Merry Craddock, of Amberley Court, Stroud
- 1950: Captain Alan Joseph Macdonald Richardson, of Southrop Manor, near Lechlade
- 1951: Lieut-Colonel John Savile Hoole-Lowsley-Williams, of Chavenage, Tetbury
- 1952: The Hon. William Ralph Seymour Bathurst of Cold Ashton Manor
- 1953: Brigadier Alan Algernon Marion Durand, of Ellerncroft, Wotton-under-Edge
- 1954: Major-General George James Paul St. Clair, of Upton House, Tetbury
- 1955: Major John Edward Buckingham Pope, of Upton Grove, Tetbury
- 1956: George Montagu John Llewelyn Whitmore, of Manor House, Lower Slaughter, Cheltenham.
- 1957: Brevet-Colonel William Alfred Chester-Master, of Norcote House, Cirencester
- 1958: Brevet-Colonel Martin St John Valentine Gibbs of Ewen, Cirencester
- 1959: Colonel Frederick Ferris Bligh St. George, of Hill Court, Shipton Moyne, Tetbury
- 1960: Anthony Biddulph of Rodmarton Manor, Cirencester
- 1961: Colonel Geoffrey Peter Shakerley, of Wells Folly, Moreton-in-Marsh
- 1962: Charles Talbot Rhys Wingfield of Barrington Park, Great Barrington
- 1963: William Parry Cripps, of Stratton Place, Cirencester.
- 1964: Major John David Summers, of North Rye House, Moreton-in-Marsh.
- 1965: Major Peter Frazer Sinclair Clifford of Frampton Court, Frampton-on-Severn
- 1966: David Cecil Wynter Verey, of Barnsley House, near Cirencester.
- 1967: Mary Dent-Brocklehurst, of Sudeley Castle, Winchcombe, Cheltenham.
- 1968: Robert Evelyn Herbert Fender, of The Manor House, Withington, near Cheltenham.
- 1969: Ian Norman Mitchell of Trull House
- 1970: Olive Katherine Lloyd Lloyd-Baker of Hardwicke Court, Gloucester
- 1971: Major Geoffrey Thomas St. John Sanders of Buckhorn House, Bisley, Stroud
- 1972: Malcolm St Clair, of Optow House, Tetbury
- 1973: Lieut.-Commander Nicholas Robin Benson, R.N., of Aycote House, Rendcomb, Cirencester
- 1974: Lieut-Colonel David Lowsley-Williams, of Chavenage, Tetbury.

== High Sheriffs ==
=== 20th century ===
- 1975: Lieut.-Colonel Stephen Reginald Martin Jenkins, of Hampnett Manor, Northleach, Cheltenham
- 1976: Desmond Frederick Shirley Godman of Great Rissington Manor, Cheltenham.
- 1977: Brevet-Colonel Robert Charles Townsend Sivewright of Talland House, South Cerney, Cirencester.
- 1978: Thomas Maurice Ponsonby, of The Common, Little Faringdon, Lechlade.
- 1979: Henry William George Elwes of Colesbourne Park, Cheltenham
- 1980: Oscar Henry Colbourn, of Crickley Barrow
- 1981: Colonel Michael Colvin Watson of Eastington House, Ampney St. Peter, Cirencester
- 1982: Robert John Grantley Berkeley, of Berkeley Castle
- 1983: Alasdair Andrew Orr Morrison of Maisemore Park, Gloucester
- 1984: James Angus Buchanan Baillie-Hamilton of South Farm, Shipton Oliffe, Cheltenham
- 1985: Major Michael Thomas Noel Hamilton Wills of Misarden Park, Misarden
- 1986: Major Philip Sheeny Morris-Keating of Walnut Tree Cottage, Estcourt Park, Shipton Moyne
- 1987: David Richard Ayshford Sanford of Pauntley Court, Redmarley
- 1988: Captain Charles Patrick Berrill-Daly of Notcliffe House, Deerhurst, Gloucester
- 1989: Greville Edward Mervyn Vernon of Newington House, Kingscote
- 1990: Colonel John Evelyn Baring Hills, of The Priory Cottage, Long Newnton, Tetbury.
- 1991: Peter Roland Henry Clifford, of Manor Farm, Frampton-on-Severn.
- 1992: Philip Reginald Smith of Campden House, Chipping Campden
- 1993: Charles Lloyd Baker of Hardwicke Court
- 1994: Richard Annesley Coxwell-Rogers of Close Farm, Coberley
- 1995: Frederick Hugh Philip Hamilton Wills of Old House, Rendcomb
- 1996: John Peel of Dudgrove Farm, Fairford
- 1997: William Gregory Francis Meath Baker of Hasfield Court
- 1998: James Eykyn of Abbots Hill, Duntisbourne Abbots
- 1999: Mark William Vestey, Foxcote Manor, Andoversford, Cheltenham

=== 21st century ===
- 2000: Major John Vickers Eyre, of Boyts Farm, Tytherington, Wootton-under-Edge
- 2001: Jane Jenner-Fust, of Hill Court, Berkeley
- 2002: John Moger Woolley, of Winterbourne
- 2003: Deborah Leigh Hutton, of Chestal House, Dursley
- 2004: Simon Huson Preston, of Lowfield Farm, Tetbury
- 2005: Michael John Christopher Stone
- 2006: Alfred Cosier Morris, of Old Sodbury, Bristol
- 2007: Jonathan Dodgson Carr, of Withington
- 2008: Brian Maurice Thornton, of Aylburton, Lydney
- 2009: Anne Chambers, of Chipping Campden
- 2010: Ceri Thomas Evans, of Blaisdon, Longhope
- 2011: Marcus Beresford Heywood, of Haresfield, Stonehouse
- 2012: (Robert) Duncan Clegg, of Hartpury
- 2013: Hugh John Hamilton Tollemache, of Stow-on-the-Wold
- 2014: Thomas Alexander Fortescue Frost, of Kington, Thornbury.
- 2015: Dr Roger John Head of Highnam Court, Highnam
- 2016: The Countess Bathurst of Cirencester
- 2017: Lieutenant-Colonel Andrew James Tabor, of Cheltenham
- 2018: Charles Martell, of Broomsgreen, Dymock
- 2019: Robert Charles Grantley Berkeley, of Berkeley
- 2020: Helen Edith Lovatt, of Cheltenham
- 2021: Rosina Jane Tufnell, of Cirencester
- 2022: Air Marshal Sir Graham Anthony Miller, of Sherdington, Cheltenham
- 2023: Henry Claude Winwood Robinson, of Woodmancote, Cirencester
- 2024: Mark Hurrell, of Gloucester
- 2025: Julie Dawn Kent, of Gloucester
- 2026: Dame Fiona Caire Reynolds, DBE, Cirencester
