= Durand of Gloucester =

Sheriff of Gloucestershire (d. circa 1096)

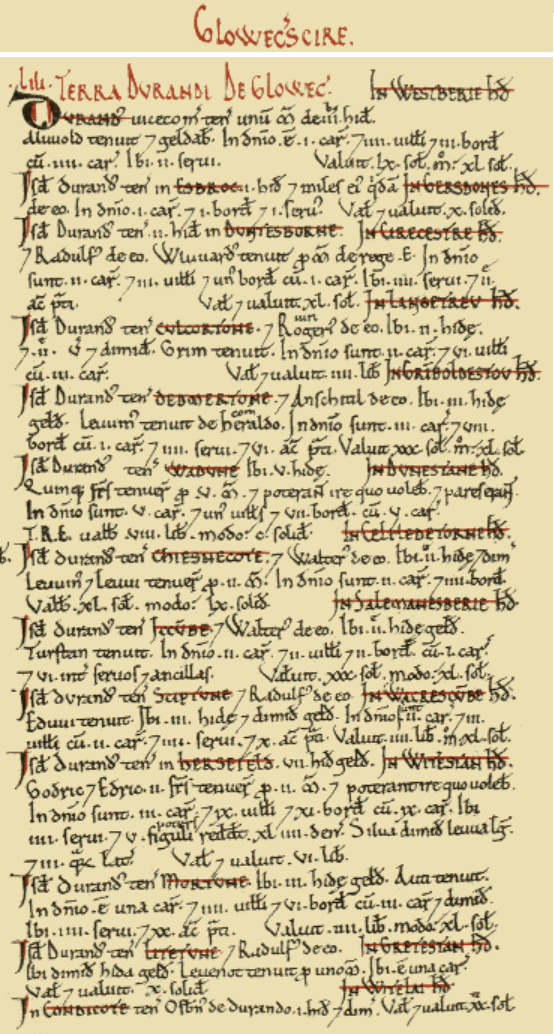
13 Gloucestershire holdings of Durand vicecom(es) ("Durand the Sheriff") listed in the Domesday Book of 1086

Durand of Gloucester (d. circa 1096) was Sheriff of Gloucestershire in 1086 and was one of the tenants-in-chief of King William the Conqueror in Gloucestershire and elsewhere, with a total of 63 holding listed in the Domesday Book of 1086.

== Biography ==
Durand was the heir of his brother Roger de Pitres (d. pre-1083), Sheriff of Gloucestershire from about 1071. He died in about 1096 when his heir became his nephew (Roger's son) Walter of Gloucester (died 1129), hereditary Sheriff of Gloucestershire in 1097 and in 1105–6, and Castellan of Gloucester Castle (also seemingly Constable of England under King Henry I (1100–1135))

Walter's son was Miles of Gloucester, 1st Earl of Hereford (died 1143) (alias Miles of Gloucester), a great magnate based in the west of England, hereditary Constable of England and Sheriff of Gloucestershire. The nucleus of Miles' holdings was the fiefdom of his great-uncle Durand of Gloucester.

Both Durand and his brother Roger de Pitres were buried in Gloucester Abbey (St. Peter's Abbey) in Gloucester (since 1541 Gloucester Cathedral).

== Sources ==
- Morris, W.A (April 1918). "The Office of Sheriff in the Early Norman Period". English Historical Review. 33 (130): 145–175. doi:10.1093/ehr/xxxiii.cxxx.145.
