= Thomas Throckmorton =

Thomas Throckmorton may refer to:

- Thomas Throckmorton (died 1472), MP for Worcestershire 1447, 1449
- Thomas Throckmorton (died 1568), MP for Westbury and Heytesbury
- Sir Thomas Throckmorton (Gloucestershire MP), MP for Gloucestershire, 1589
- Thomas Throckmorton (died 1615), MP for Warwick and Warwickshire
- Thomas Throckmorton (died 1656), officer in the New Model Army executed in 1656
- Tom Bentley Throckmorton (1885–1961), American neurologist
