= Pauncefoot =

Pauncefoot may refer to:

- Compton Pauncefoot, a village and civil parish in Somerset, England
- John Pauncefoot (1368-c.1445), member of Parliament for Gloucestershire
