= Thomas Berkeley =

Thomas Berkeley may refer to:

- Sir Thomas Berkeley (1575–1611), English MP for Gloucestershire, 1604–11
- Thomas Berkeley (1351–1405), English MP for Gloucestershire, 1380 and 1390
- Sir Thomas Berkeley (died 1488), English MP for Leicestershire, 1472–75
- Thomas Berkeley, 5th Baron Berkeley (1472–1532), Baron Berkeley
- Thomas Berkeley, 6th Baron Berkeley (1505–1534), Baron Berkeley

== See also ==
- Thomas de Berkeley (disambiguation)
