= Walter of Gloucester =

English baron, died c. 1129

Walter of Gloucester (also Walter FitzRoger or Walter de Pitres) (d. c. 1129) was an early Anglo-Norman official of the King of England during the early years of the Norman conquest of the South Welsh Marches. He was a sheriff of Gloucester and also a Constable under Henry I.

== Life ==
Walter of Gloucester was the son of Roger de Pitres, and his wife, Adeliza, (Note: The name of his mother, Adeliza, is found in Historia et cartularium monasterii Sancti Petri Gloucestriæ, i, 81, 125, 188-9; ii, 129. See: Keats-Rohan, Domesday People, Vol. I, 451,) and was the earliest to use the style "of Gloucester" in his family. A landholder himself at the time of Domesday, by 1095 Walter had control of the bulk of the estates formerly held by Roger his father and Durand of Gloucester his uncle. In addition Walter acquired other estates by royal grants. These estates were principally in four shires, Gloucestershire, Hampshire, Hertfordshire and Wiltshire.

He was hereditary Sheriff of Gloucestershire in 1097 and 1105-6. Sometimes called Constable of England he may only have been constable of Gloucester Castle He is recorded as a constable of the royal household of Henry I from 1114 on. Walter erected or had a part in the erection of the castles of Bristol and Rochester as well as the Tower of London. Walter donated Westwood to Gloucester Abbey for the soul of his brother Herbert and confirmed a grant of Colne by his father Roger. He endowed the canons of Llanthony Priory in Wales with lands from his lordship of Beryntone and retired to the abbey in his old age where he died a monk and was buried in the chapter house, about 1129.

== Family ==
He was married to Bertha. They were the parents of:

- Miles of Gloucester, 1st Earl of Hereford
- Matilda, who married Richard Fitz Pons
