= Ian Mitchell (English cricketer) =

English cricketer

Personal information
- Full name: Ian Norman Mitchell
- Born: 7 April 1925; Henbury, Bristol, England
- Died: 4 June 2011 (aged 86); Tetbury, Gloucestershire, England
- Batting: Right-handed

Domestic team information
- Years: Team
- 1950–1952: Gloucestershire
- 1949: Cambridge University

Career statistics
Competition	First-class
Matches	11
Runs scored	160
Batting average	8.88
100s/50s	–/–
Top score	27
Balls bowled	–
Wickets	–
Bowling average	–
5 wickets in innings	–
10 wickets in match	–
Best bowling	–
Catches/stumpings	5/–
- Source: Cricinfo, 31 July 2011

Ian Norman Mitchell (17 April 1925 – 4 June 2011) was an English cricketer. Mitchell was a right-handed batsman. The son of Major Alexander Black Mitchell, a High Sheriff of Gloucestershire, he was born in Henbury, Bristol and educated at Harrow School, where he represented the school cricket team.

While studying at Cambridge University, Mitchell made his first-class debut for Cambridge University Cricket Club against Middlesex in 1949. He made a further first-class appearance that season for the university, the last of which came against Warwickshire. The following season he made his first-class debut for Gloucestershire against Lancashire in the 1950 County Championship. He made 7 further first-class appearances for the county, the last of which came against Hampshire in the 1952 County Championship. His 8 first-class matches for the county came with limited success, with him scoring 97 runs at an average of 6.92, with a high score of 24. At a time when the use of amateurs as captains was coming to an end, Mitchell was offered the role of captaining Gloucestershire after Sir Derrick Bailey resigned at the end of the 1952 season, but he turned it down citing that he didn't have the time. As a result, Gloucestershire appointed Jack Crapp, the senior professional, as its captain for the 1953 and 1954 seasons.

Mitchell married Anne Denise Perpetua Gibbs on 7 October 1950. The couple had 4 children.

Mitchell became the High Sheriff of Gloucestershire in 1969. He died at his home near Tetbury, Gloucestershire, on 4 June 2011.
