= Thomas Baynham =

16th-century English nobleman

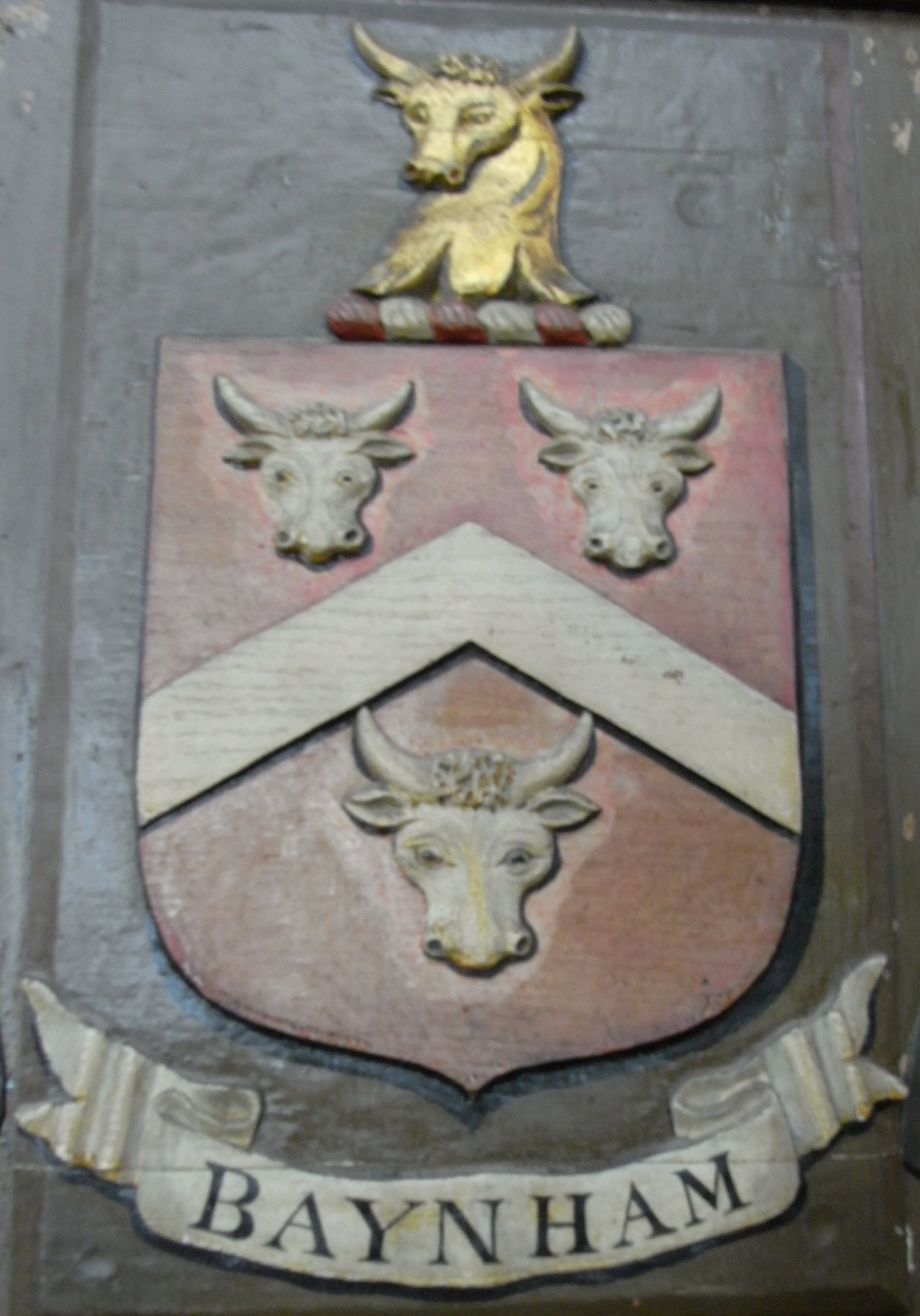
Arms of Baynham: Gules, a chevron between three bull's heads cabossed argent armed or. Painted escutcheon on the 19th-century mural monument erected in Mitcheldean Church, Gloucestershire, on which are affixed the 15th-century brasses of the two wives of Thomas Baynham (died 1500), Constable of St Briavel's Castle, great-grandfather of Thomas Baynham (died 1611)

Thomas Baynham (1536-1611) was Lord of the manor of Clearwell, in the Forest of Dean, Gloucestershire. He served as Sheriff of Gloucestershire in 1582 and 1602. He died on 2 October 1611, aged 75, and was buried at Newland, Gloucestershire.

== Origins ==
He was the 3rd son of Sir George Baynham (died 1546), Sheriff of Gloucestershire in 1543, by Cecilia Gage, daughter of Sir John Gage. After his father's death, his mother married Sir Charles Herbert. Thomas Baynham succeeded his elder brother Christopher Baynham (born 1529) in the Baynham estates.

Thomas had seven half-sisters by his father's first wife Bridget, a daughter of William Kingston. Frances Baynham was a maid in the household of Elizabeth Scrope, Countess of Oxford, and then a gentlewoman in the household of Mary I of England. She married Henry Jerningham. Dorothy Baynham married Roger Williams of Llangybi and Usk, Joan or Jane married Anthony Strelley (a son of Nicholas Strelley), and Anne Baynham married William Gefferies of Ham Castle.

== Marriage and progeny ==
He married Mary Winter, daughter of William Winter of Lydney, Gloucestershire. They had two sons who both died without issue and two daughters, joint-co-heiresses:

- Cecily, married Sir William Throckmorton, 1st Baronet (c. 1579-1628), of Tortworth, Gloucestershire.
- Joanna (born 1585), married John Vaughan of Kinnersley, Herefordshire (died pre-1620)

== Sources ==
- MacLean, Sir John, The History of the Manors of Dean Magna and Abenhall. Published in: Transactions of the Bristol and Gloucestershire Archaeological Society, Vol.6, 1881-2, pp. 185-187, pedigree of Baynham
