= Roger de Pitres =

Norman sheriff of Gloucester

Roger de Pitres (also called Roger de Pistri) (d. bef. 1083), a Norman, was the Sheriff of Gloucester under William the Conqueror and constable of Gloucester Castle.

== Life ==
Roger's origins are confirmed in his territorial appellation, de Pitres; he was a Norman from Pîtres, Eure, canton of Pont-de-l'Arche. He followed William the Conqueror to England in 1066. Roger was an adherent of William FitzOsbern and owed much of his landed wealth to this association. After the death of Earl William in 1071, Roger was more closely associated with the crown. He was sheriff of Gloucester from 1071 and constable of Gloucester castle, which he constructed. Members of his family succeeded him in these hereditary offices. (Note: Roger's successors as Sheriffs of Gloucester and constable were his brother Durand of Gloucester (d. 1096), who in turn was succeeded by Roger's son Walter of Gloucester, and his grandson, Miles of Gloucester, 1st Earl of Hereford who succeeded his father Walter before 1126. See: David Walker, 'Miles of Gloucester, Earl of Hereford', Transactions of the Bristol and Gloucestershire Archaeological Society, Vol. 77 (1958), pp. 67-68.) His brother Durand of Gloucester (d. 1096) succeeded him as sheriff by 1083. Both Roger de Pitres and his brother Durand were buried at St. Peter's Abbey in Gloucester.

== Family ==
Roger's wife was named Adeliza and together they had:

- Walter of Gloucester, subsequently Sheriff of Gloucester
- Herbert, of whom little is known other than he predeceased his brother Walter.
