= John Higford =

English politician (c. 1551 – 1612)

John Higford (c. 1551 – 1612) was an English landowner and MP.

He was the son of John Higford of Dixton Manor, Gloucestershire and his wife Elizabeth, daughter of Edmund Fettiplace of Besselsleigh, Berkshire. The Higfords/Hugfords were descended from an old Shropshire family, who had acquired Dixton through marriage in the mid-fifteenth century. He matriculated at Hart Hall, Oxford in 1568, but subsequently was tutored by the puritan William Cole of Corpus Christi College, Oxford He entered the Inner Temple in 1571.

Sometime before May 1591 he married Dorothy, daughter of William Rogers (d. 1593) of Dowdeswell, Gloucestershire with whom he had 2 sons, including his heir William Higford and 3 daughters. In 1591 Dorothy was described as her father's sole heir and the couple were executors of his will, the Dowdeswell manor court being held in their names in 1594. However, Dowdeswell subsequently passed to her half-brother William.

Higford represented Cricklade in the parliaments of 1572 and 1586 through the patronage of the Brydges family, whose seat at Sudeley castle was close to Dixton.
