= William Higford =

16th-century English politician

William Higford (c. 1580 – 1650) was an English landowner, member of Parliament and writer.

He was the son of John Higford of Dixton Manor, Gloucestershire. He was educated at Corpus Christi, Oxford, where his tutor was Sebastian Benefield, and graduated in 1599. He was admitted to the Middle Temple in 1600.

He married Mary, daughter of Sir John Meux of Kingston, Isle of Wight. Through the influence of his wife's family he was chosen to represent Newtown, Isle of Wight in the parliament of 1614, after George Stoughton chose to sit for Guildford. He was a commissioner of sewers for Gloucestershire by 1615. By 1619 he was a Justice of the Peace in Gloucestershire through the good offices of Giles Brydges, 3rd Baron Chandos.

In the following decade Higford was mired in debt. His position was alleviated by the dowry payment received on the marriage of his eldest son John (d. 1635) to Frances, sister of John Scudamore, 1st Viscount Scudamore, but his failure to fulfil the terms of the marriage agreement led to protracted legal disputes.

Towards the end of his life he wrote a manual of advice for his grandson and heir John (d. 1703), which was published after his death as Institutions, or, Advise to his Grandson (1658).
