= Thomas de Berkeley =

Thomas de Berkeley may refer to:

- Thomas de Berkeley, 4th feudal Baron Berkeley (c. 1170–1243)
- Thomas de Berkeley, 1st Baron Berkeley (1245–1321), grandson of the above
- Thomas de Berkeley, 3rd Baron Berkeley (c. 1293 or 1296–1361), grandson of the above
- Thomas de Berkeley, 5th Baron Berkeley (1352/53–1417), grandson of the above
- Thomas de Berkeley (MP) for Gloucestershire

== See also ==
- Thomas Berkeley (disambiguation)
