= Nicholas Wykes =

16th-century English politician

Nicholas Wykes (c. 1488 – 1558) was a Gloucestershire landowner and MP.

He was the eldest son of Edmund Wykes of Dodington, Gloucestershire and Dursley, Gloucestershire and Elizabeth, daughter of Thomas Norton of Bristol. The family's estate was comparatively modest, but his father secured his marriage to Elizabeth, daughter of Robert Poyntz (died 1520) and Margaret, illegitimate daughter of Anthony Woodville, 2nd Earl Rivers. Through this link to Elizabeth of York, Wykes obtained a post as gentleman waiter to prince Henry, the short-lived son of Henry VIII.

Wykes held a number of posts in the local administration of Bristol and Gloucestershire and twice served as High Sheriff of Gloucestershire. He lived as Dodington, where Leland described him as having restored the medieval manor house with attractive buildings. He was a knight of the shire for Gloucestershire in the parliament of April 1554.

His will, written in 1556, names 4 sons and 3 married daughters.
