= Sir John Higford =

English politician (1529–1607)

Sir John Higford (1529–1607) was an English landowner and member of Parliament.

He was the son of William Hugford of Dixton Manor, Gloucestershire by his first wife Elizabeth, daughter of William Rudhall, serjeant at law of Brampton Abbotts, Herefordshire. He was descended from an old Shropshire family, who had acquired Dixton through marriage in the mid-fifteenth century. He was educated at Corpus Christi College, Oxford under John Jewel. He married Elizabeth, daughter of Edmund Fettiplace of Besselsleigh, Berkshire, by whom he had 2 sons (including his heir John Higford and 4 daughters. His will mentions the graves of two further, unnamed wives.

He represented Buckingham in the parliament of 1558. This was presumably through the influence of his wife's family, one of her brothers having represented the same seat in 1554. He was High Sheriff of Gloucestershire in 1572-3 and 1585–6. He was employed by Giles Brydges, 3rd Baron Chandos in the management of his estate and as deputy to him as Lord Lieutenant of Gloucestershire.

He was knighted in September 1592 during a visit of Elizabeth I to Dixton, where he had rebuilt part of the existing manor house. According to his grandson, he was 'famous for his hospitality'.
