= HM Prison Gloucester =

Former 18th-century prison in Gloucester, England

Coordinates: 51.8652°N 2.2517°W

HMP Gloucester
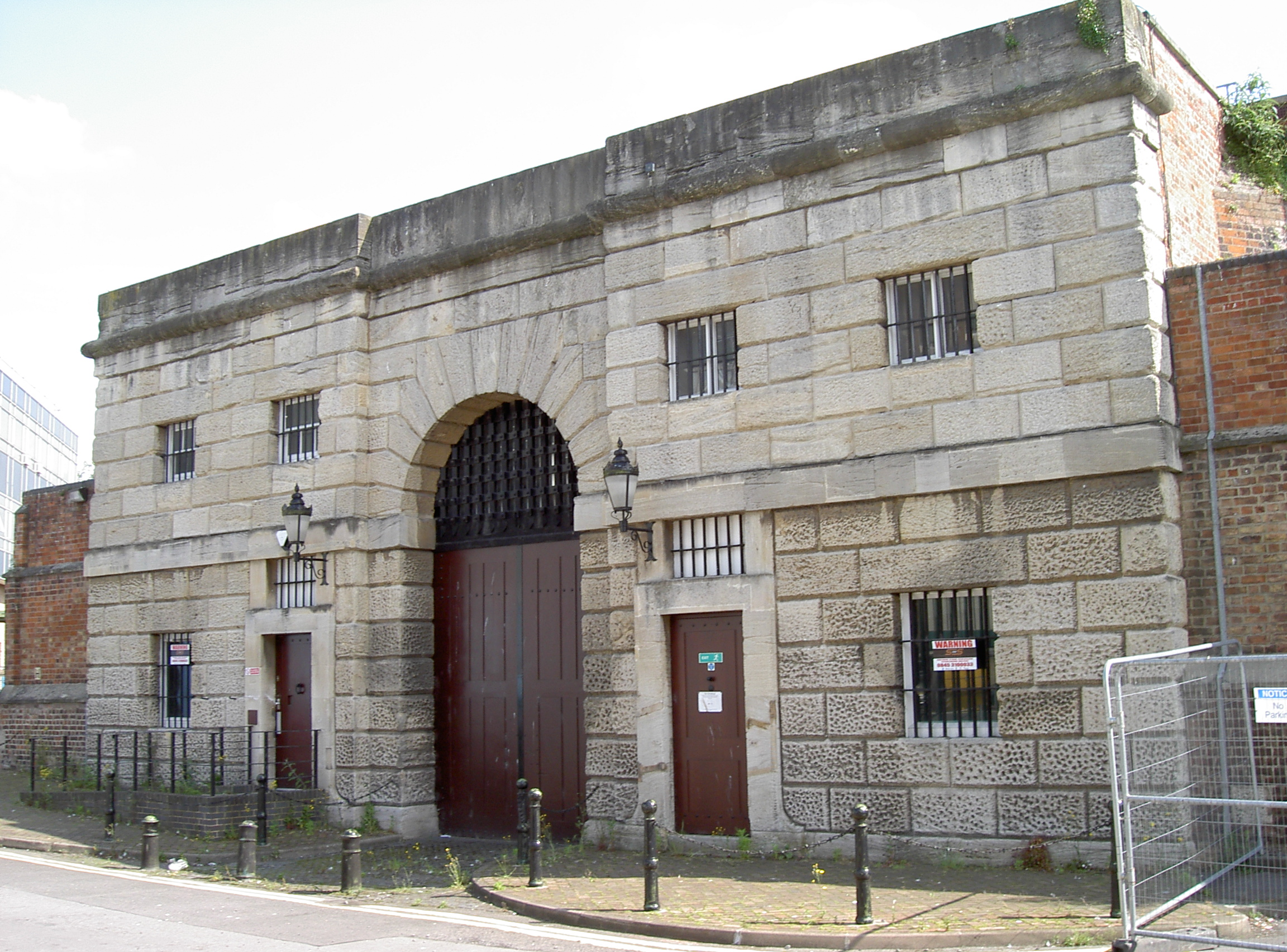
- Old entrance to HM Prison Gloucester in 2013
- Interactive map of HMP Gloucester
- Location: Gloucester, Gloucestershire
- Status: Closed
- Security class: Adult Male/Category B
- Population: 323 (January 2005)
- Opened: 1791
- Closed: 2013
- Managed by: HM Prison Services

HM Prison Gloucester was a Category B men's prison located in Gloucester, Gloucestershire, England. It was originally opened in 1792, on the site of Gloucester Castle whose keep had been used as a prison.

The prison was operated by Her Majesty's Prison Service and closed in 2013.

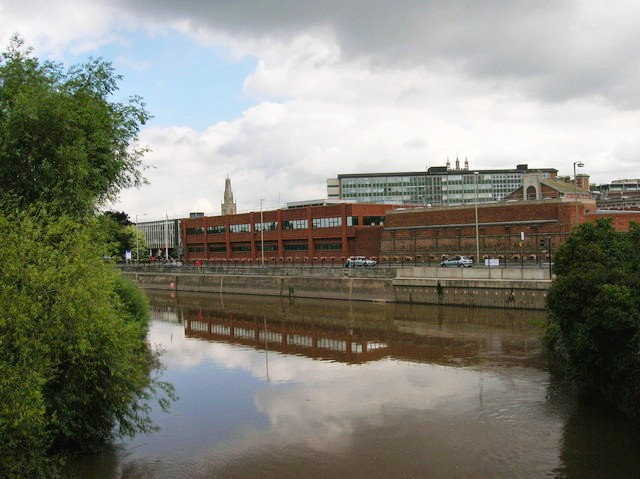
HM Prison Gloucester in 2007

== History ==
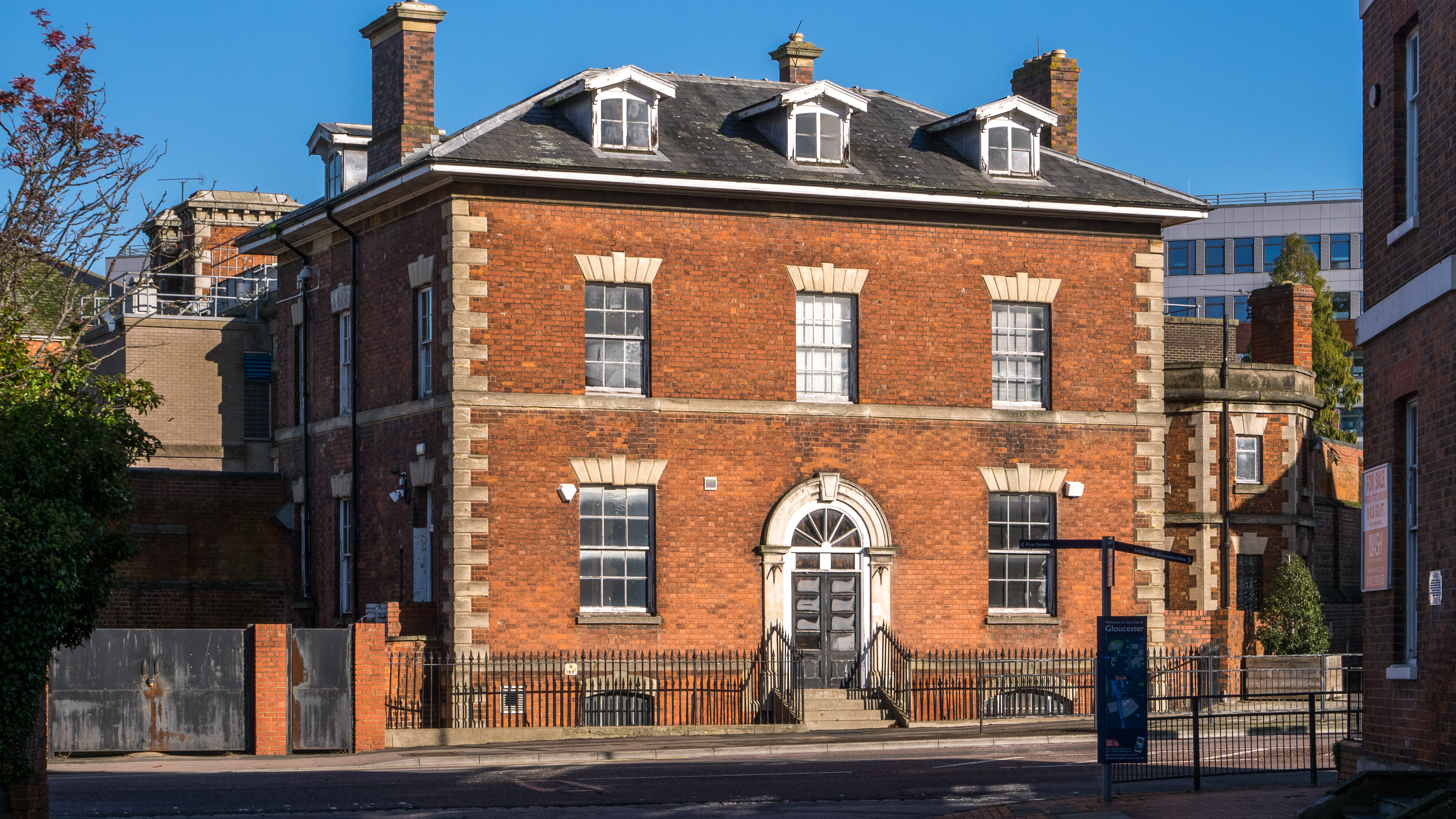
Prison Governor's House, a Grade II listed building

Designed by William Blackburn, the prison was constructed on the site of Gloucester Castle, the keep of which had previously been used as a prison. It opened as a county gaol in 1792.

In 1840, it was substantially rebuilt with flanking brick wings by Thomas Fuljames. A new young offenders wing was built at the prison in 1971. Further improvements were made in 1987, including a new gate, administration block and visits centre.

In April, 2003, Gloucester was named in a survey as "among the 20 most overcrowded jails" in the United Kingdom. The following day, the prison was the scene of a three-and-a-half-hour siege when two prisoners protested over visiting rights by barricading themselves in a cell.

A Time Bank scheme was launched at Gloucester Prison in February 2006. Inmates who joined the scheme restored bicycles in the prison workshop, and this time was credited to their friends and families who could cash it in to get help from volunteers in the community. The scheme continued at the prison until its closure.

In June 2007, the Independent Monitoring Board criticised Gloucester Prison for its overcrowding, poor dining provision and cramped cells. A month later over 100 prisoners had to be moved to other jails after severe flooding across the Gloucestershire area submerged the ground floor of the prison and interfered with its water supplies.

In August 2007, the prison was criticised by Her Majesty's Chief Inspector of Prisons after an inspection report found the levels of organised activities for inmates at Gloucester (such as training and education) were "woeful". The report also stated that one wing of the prison should be refurbished. However the prison was described as "very positive" overall because of good management.

On 10 January 2013, Justice Secretary Chris Grayling announced that the prison was one of seven in England to close. The prison formally closed on 31 March 2013. The site of the prison is due to be redeveloped, however there are a number of executed criminals buried in unmarked graves under the prison. It was reported in April 2013 that the Malmaison hotel chain have expressed an interest in converting the site into a hotel, while an alternative proposal would see a prison museum with ghost tours housed at the former jail. In March the site was formally put up for sale, with an expectation that at least part of the site will be for housing.

On 24 December 2014, it was announced that Gloucester Prison along with Dorchester Prison, Kingston Prison and Shepton Mallet Prison had been sold to City and Country. There will be a community consultation on the development of all the sites, with plans including mixed-used schemes of assisted living units alongside retail and social amenity areas. In December 2015 it was revealed that the remains of a wall of a large Norman castle had been uncovered in the former exercise yard of the prison.

From April 2017 to October 2018, the former prison was open to the public under the Jailhouse Tours brand whilst planning permission was finalised.

== Notable former inmates ==
- Herbert Rowse Armstrong, the only British solicitor to have been hanged for murder (executed in 1922)
- Arthur Griffith, Former President of Dáil Éireann ( May 1918 - March 1919 )
- Stefan Kiszko, wrongly convicted of murder
- Peter McAleese, British soldier, prisoner during the 1970s
- Pierce McCan, Irish revolutionary, died in the prison in 1919
