= Fust baronets =

Extinct baronetcy in the Baronetage of England

The Fust Baronetcy, of Hill in the County of Gloucester, was a title in the Baronetage of England. It was created on 21 August 1662 for Edward Fust, who had earlier fought as a Royalist in the Civil War. The title became extinct on the death of the sixth Baronet in 1779.

The 2nd, 3rd and 4th baronets all served as High Sheriff of Gloucestershire (in 1675, 1703 and 1718 respectively).

== Fust baronets, of Hill (1662) ==
Escutcheon of the Fust baronets of Hill

=== Sir Edward Fust, 1st Baronet (1606–1674) ===
He was the son of Richard Fust (died 1613), a London grocer, and his first wife Agnes, daughter of John Hyde of St Dunstan in the East, grocer. His father acquired the manor of Hill, Gloucestershire from his brother-in-law Henry Fleetwood, who was deeply in debt. He married Bridget, daughter of Sir Thomas Denton of Hillesden, Buckinghamshire in 1631. John Smith (steward of Berkeley) described him as 'an understanding gent'. According to Thomas Rudge, 'Edward Fust was an eminent loyalist during the civil war, and his zealous services procured him the dignity of Baronet', although he did not obtain that rank until August 1662. His will mentioned his heir John, another son Richard and two married daughters, Eleanor married to George Bennett of Bath and Margaret married to Ralph Ironside. He died in April 1674 and was buried at Hill, where he had built a chapel for family burials. His wife died shortly after.

=== Sir John Fust, 2nd Baronet (1637–1699) ===
He matriculated at Oriel College, Oxford in 1658 and married Elizabeth, daughter of Sir Richard Cocks of Dumbleton, Gloucestershire in 1666. He served as sheriff of Gloucestershire in 1675, the year after he succeeded to the baronetcy. He died in 1699 and was buried at Hill, his wife survived him and their son, dying in 1717.

=== Sir Edward Fust, 3rd Baronet (1667–1713) ===
He was the only one of his parents' children to survive infancy and matriculated at Oriel College, Oxford in 1685. He served as sheriff in 1703.

He married 4 times:

1. Anne Mary, daughter of Thomas Stephens of Lypiatt
  - Elizabeth married Thomas Warner of Paganhill, Gloucestershire
2. Elizabeth, daughter and heiress of William Mohun of Portishead, Somerset
  - Edward, 4th baronet
3. Catherine, daughter of Francis Mohun of Fleet, Dorset
  - Catherine (1704–1754)
  - Francis, 5th baronet
4. Susanna, daughter of Richard Cocks of Dumbleton and widow of Roger Thompson, a London merchant. Susan was his mother's niece.

=== Sir Edward Fust, 4th Baronet (1693–1728) ===
He served as sheriff for Gloucestershire in 1718 and in 1722 unsuccessfully stood in the parliamentary election for Gloucester. He married Dorothy, the daughter of his stepmother Susanna and her first husband Roger Thompson. He died in February 1728. He had several children, but all died young. The last, Elizabeth, died aged 7 in 1725 after being inoculated for smallpox. he was succeeded by his half-brother. His widow married Gilbert Maximilian Mohun of Fleet, the first cousin of the 5th baronet.

=== Sir Francis Fust, 5th Baronet (1705–1769) ===
He married Fanny, daughter of Nicholas Tooker of Bristol, merchant. His pride in his descent was demonstrated by the bookplates he used for his library, the larger version of which displays 40 quarterings. He was succeeded by his eldest son.

=== Sir John Fust, 6th Baronet (1726–1779) ===
According to his funeral monument, he was 'of the middle Stature, of a benign and comely Countenance expressive of his Mind, which was active, amiable, and generous'. The same source suggests that he was prevented from following a military career by his father, but held a captain's commission under Earl Berkeley during the alarm of 1745. Thereafter he retired from public life and lived as a 'liberal, benevolent, country Gentleman'. He married Philippa, daughter of John Hamilton of Chilsom, Kent and great-niece of James Hamilton, 6th Earl of Abercorn. She was responsible for erecting his monument. On her death the estate descended to Sir John's niece Fanny, the only daughter of his younger brother Denton (1738–78).
