= Gloucester Castle =

Former castle in Gloucester, England

Coordinates: 51.863°N 2.249°W

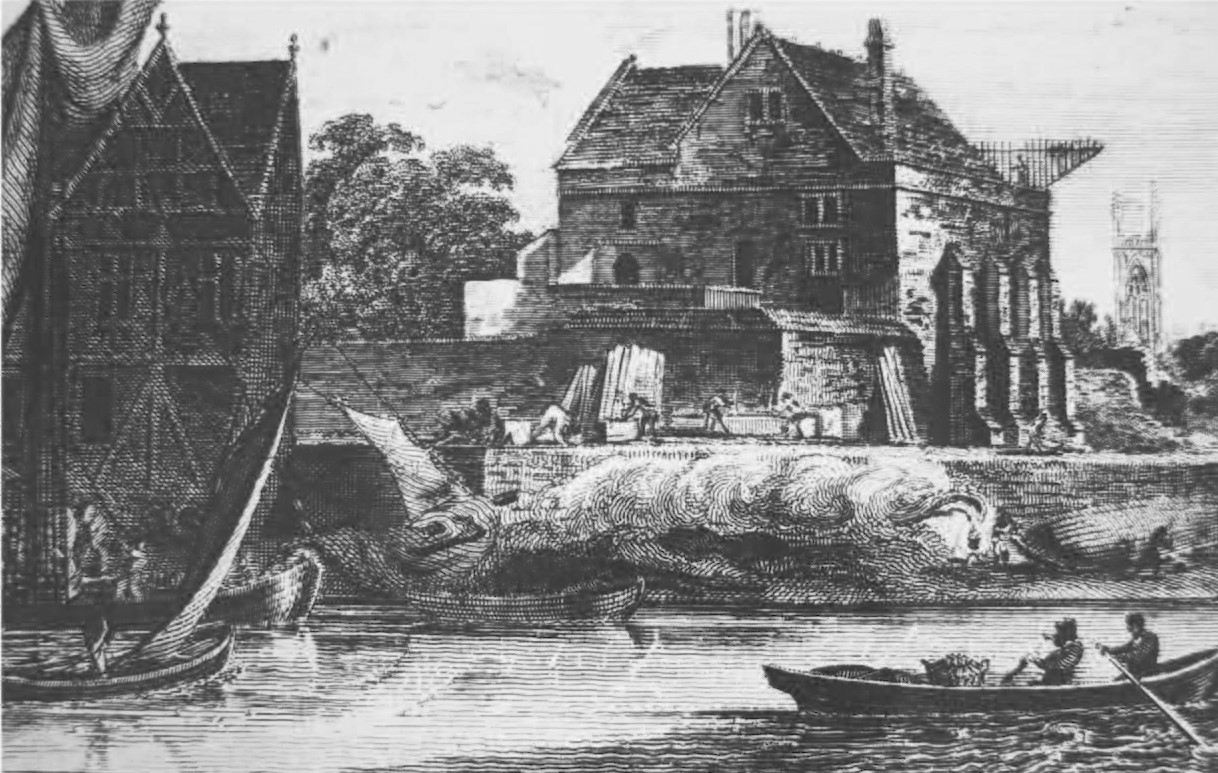
The castle keep in use as part of the county gaol (jail) in the 18th century. (A later work said to be based on an 1819 original)

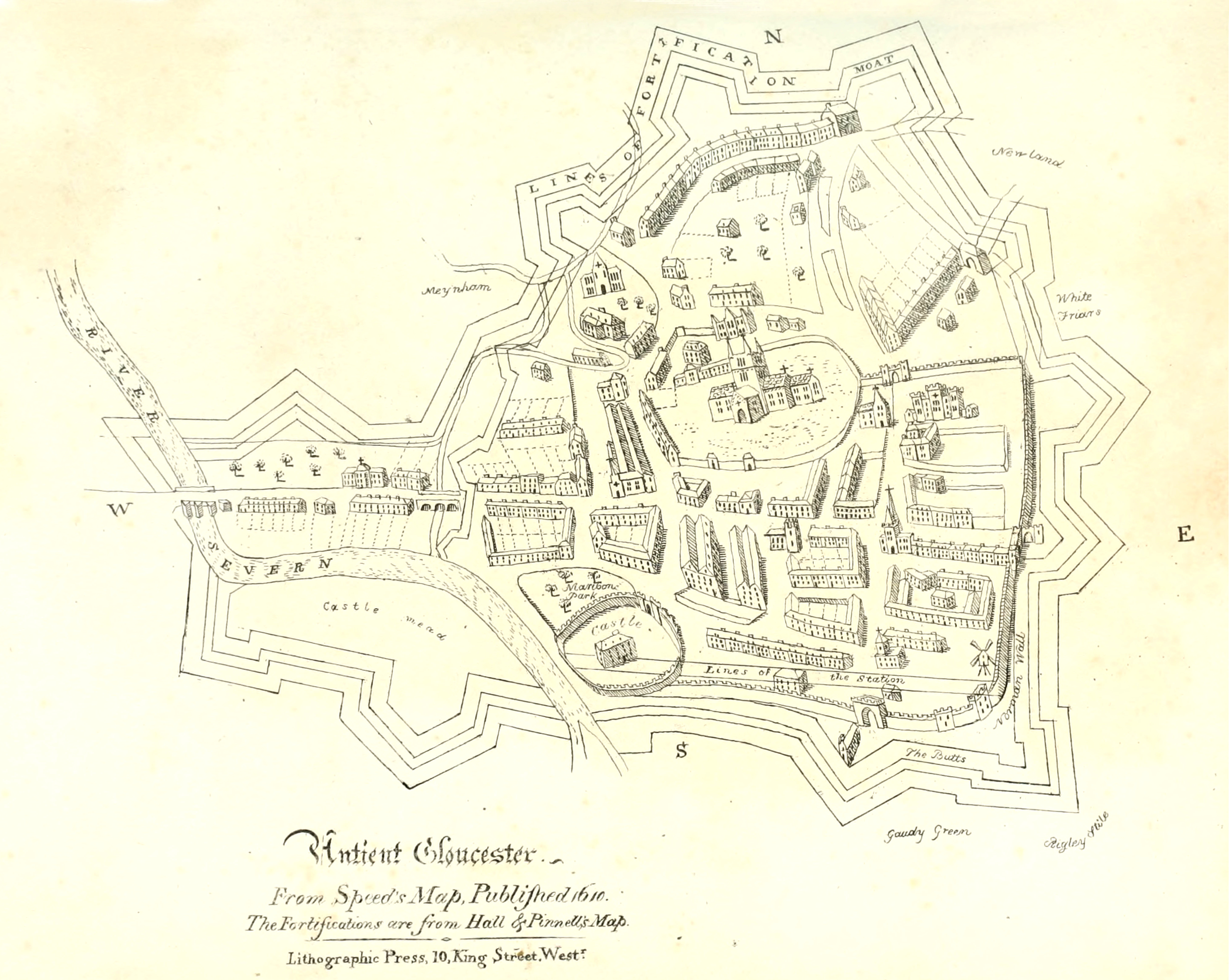
1610 map showing position of Gloucester Castle on the River Severn, with Gloucester Cathedral (centre, until 1541 Gloucester Abbey) to its north-east

Gloucester Castle was a Norman-era royal castle situated in the city of Gloucester in Gloucestershire, England. It was demolished in 1787 and replaced by Gloucester Prison.

== Early Norman motte and bailey castle ==
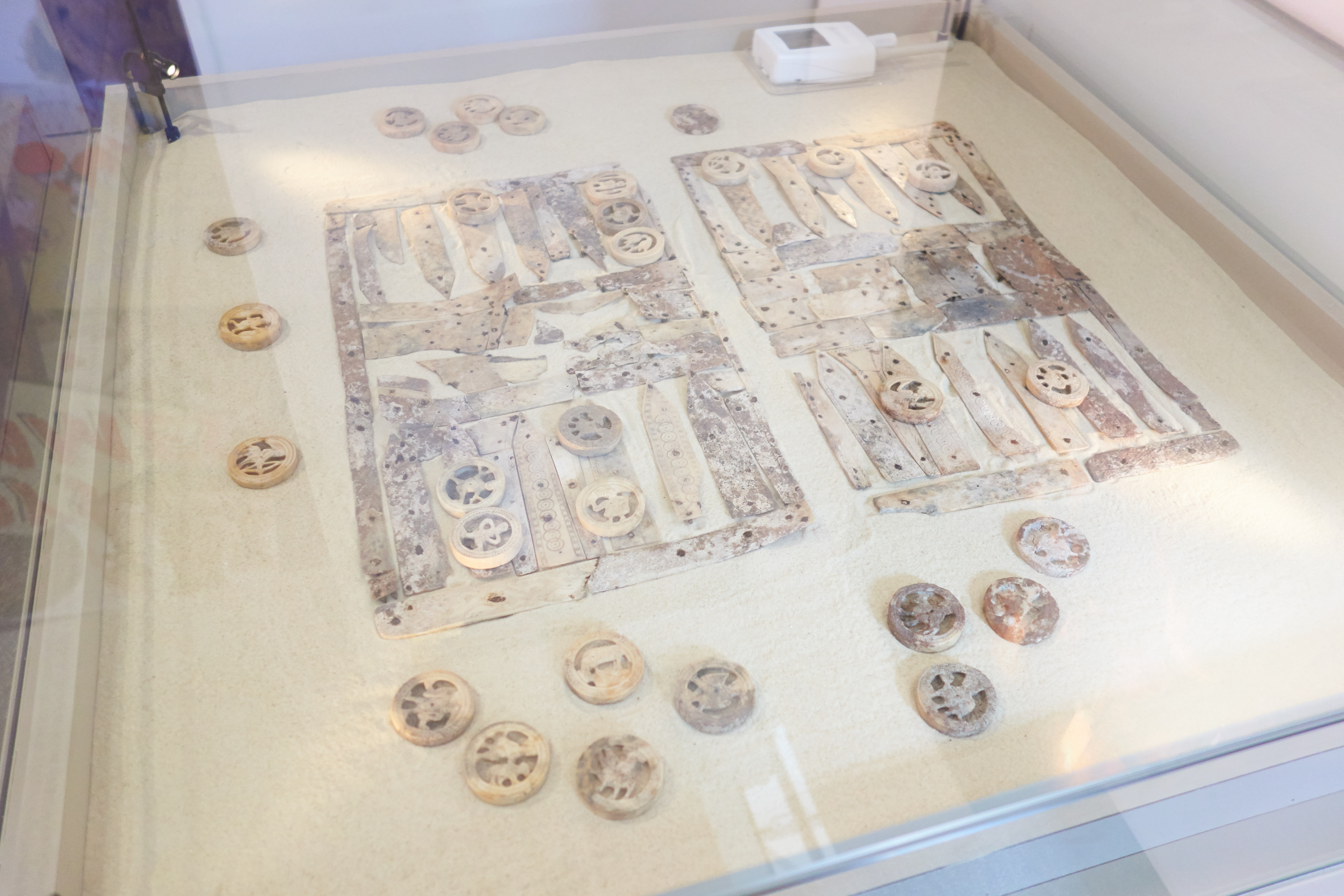
The Gloucester tabula set was found during an archaeological investigation of the Norman castle in 1983.

It was probably constructed by the Anglo-Norman Roger de Pitres, the first post-Norman Conquest Sheriff of Gloucestershire, as a simple motte and bailey castle during the reign of William the Conqueror (1066–1087), when sixteen houses were demolished to make way for it. It was enlarged by King William II (1087–1100) who demolished eight more houses. Walter of Gloucester, Sheriff of Gloucestershire, succeeded his father Roger de Pitres as Constable of the castle. Before 1113 Walter built a new castle west of Barbican hill on a former garden of Gloucester Abbey, overlooking the River Severn. Walter's son, and the next Constable of Gloucester Castle, was Miles FitzWalter of Gloucester, 1st Earl of Hereford (d. 1143) (alias Miles of Gloucester), Sheriff of Gloucestershire, a great magnate based in the west of England who became hereditary Constable of England. He was succeeded as Constable of Gloucester Castle by his eldest son Roger Fitzmiles, 2nd Earl of Hereford (d. 1155). Later it was retained by the Crown.

== King's residence ==
More improvements and some repairs were carried out by Henry III, these improvements included a bridge across the River Severn leading to a barbican in the outer wall. Henry III often used it as a residence, and it played an important role in the barons' war when it was besieged twice in 1264–1265. Part of the castle had been being used as a gaol by 1185 and it was probably then the official county gaol, as it certainly was by 1228, and Eleanor of Brittany, niece of King John and cousin of Henry III with a better claim to the throne according to primogeniture and thus becoming a state prisoner, had been briefly imprisoned there during the reign of John, from 1222 to 1223, and from 1237 to 1238, while in 1222 to accommodate her the castle temporarily moved all its prisoners elsewhere.

== Decline ==
The defences were kept in full repair until the mid-15th century. It is likely that in the reign of Richard III, the castle ceased to be maintained as a fortress, continuing in use only as the county gaol. Much of the stonework of the castle was taken to construct roads and other buildings and by the mid-17th century all the buildings around the curtain wall had apparently gone, leaving only the keep, used as the gaol, and the main gatehouse standing. In time the keep was considered to be unsuitable for use as a gaol and its demolition began in 1787. The new gaol was finished in 1791 leaving no visible remains of the castle.

== Conservation ==
In December 2015, the castle's foundations were uncovered by archaeologists who were investigating the Gloucester Prison site ahead of a new development. Since being rediscovered there have been calls to make the site open to the public. The owners of the site are currently considering how they will include parts of the castle in their plans for the site's future.

== See also ==
- Castles in Great Britain and Ireland
- List of castles in England
