= Thomas Throckmorton (Gloucestershire MP) =

Member of the Parliament of England

Sir Thomas Throckmorton (1539-1607) was an English landowner and local politician.

He was the son of Thomas Throckmorton (d. 1568) by Margaret (d. 1578), one of the six coheirs of Thomas Whittington of Pauntley, Gloucestershire. By 1567 he had married Elizabeth (d. c. 1571), daughter of Sir Edward Rogers of Cannington, Som. by whom he had no children. He subsequently married Ellen, daughter of Sir Richard Berkeley of Stoke Gifford. Ellen was a recusant and the marriage was stormy.

Thomas inherited a considerable estate and succeeded his father in being a leader of local society. He was a JP, served twice as sheriff (1560–61 and 1587–8), was MP for Gloucestershire in 1589, and was a member of the Council of the Marches. He was knighted in 1587. He had an overbearing and bellicose nature, being described by John Smyth of Nibley as 'that powerful and plottinge gent'. He was bound over to keep the peace towards Sir Thomas Proctor in 1580, accused of provoking a riot against Nicholas Poyntz in 1589, summoned before the Privy Council in 1590, and in a 1602 Star Chamber case was fined 2000 marks and disabled from bearing office. He was buried at Tortworth, where he had presumably commissioned his own tomb.

He had two children, who lived to adulthood:

- Sir William Throckmorton, 1st Baronet
- Elizabeth married Sir Thomas Dale.
