= Sir William Throckmorton, 1st Baronet =

English landowner and investor in the settlement of Virginia

Sir William Throckmorton, 1st Baronet (1579–1628) was an English landowner and investor in the settlement of Virginia.

He was the son of Sir Thomas (1539–1607) and Ellen, daughter of Sir Richard Berkeley of Stoke Gifford. He matriculated at University College, Oxford, in 1594. Having inherited his father's combative nature, he fought a duel with Walter Walsh of Little Sodbury. Shortly after inheriting his estate he had his manors of Tortworth, Charfield, and Cromhall Ligon valued for sale. He sold Tortworth in 1608 and moved to Clearwell in Newland, which he had acquired through his marriage to Cicely (b. 1586), daughter and co-heir of Sir Thomas Baynham. Smyth describes him as devouring his patrimony 'by riot & improvidence'. Despite financial difficulties which led to the sale of other manors, he paid to become a baronet in 1611. In 1619 he joined with John Smyth, Richard Berkeley and George Thorpe in sending a ship with 36 men to Virginia, intending to found a new town there at Berkeley Hundred. The venture ended in disaster with an Indian massacre in 1622. He was buried at Newland.

By his first wife he had three children, who survived to adulthood:

- Sir Baynham Throckmorton, 2nd Baronet
- Sir Nicholas Throckmorton (1614–1664), who was knighted during the civil war for his support of Charles I. He married Alice (1621–1670), daughter and co-heir of Richard Gough of Hewlesfield. Their son William became the 4th baronet.
- Elizabeth (d. 1676)

After Cicely's death he married Alice Morgan and Sarah Hale/Hall (d. 1636), whom Smyth described as his maids. When Sarah wrote her will she had four children, of whom only a daughter Mary is identified by the surname Throckmorton.
