= Crickhowell Castle =

Castle in Powys, Wales

Coordinates: 51°51′27″N 3°8′11″W

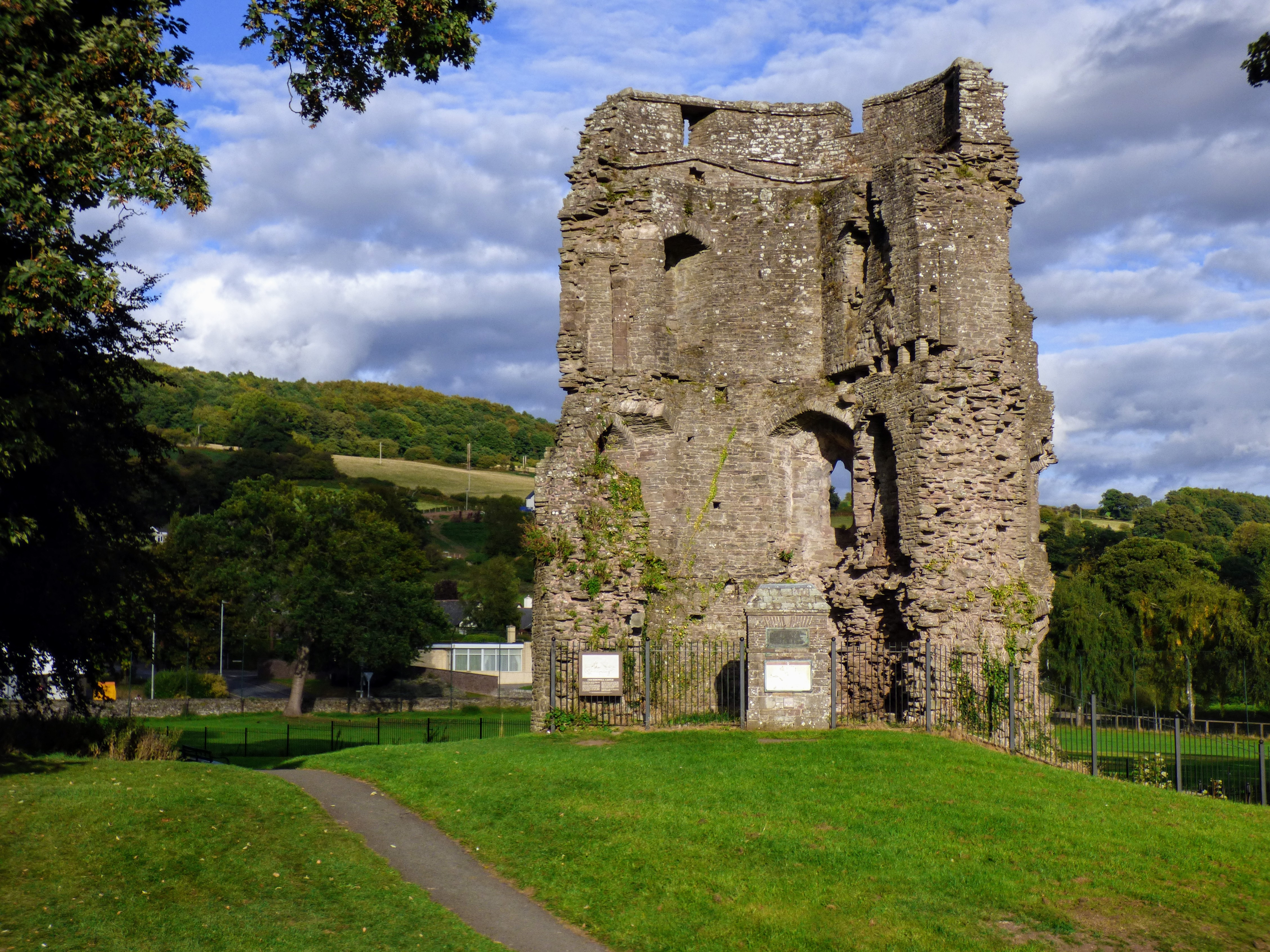
Remains of Crickhowell Castle

Crickhowell Castle (Welsh: Castell Crucywel) is a Grade I listed building in Crickhowell, Wales, now largely ruined. An alternative name, "Alisby's Castle", is sometimes used; this is thought to be after a former governor of the castle, Gerald Alisby.

== Location ==
The remaining sections of the castle walls and motte stand on a spur where a tributary stream meets the River Usk, in a more elevated position than the rest of the town, which was planned around it. It has been suggested that the castle replaced an earlier motte-and-bailey structure at nearby Maescelyn, where St Mary's Chapel, which has existed since around 1300, has also been linked with the castle by some historians. The motte is oval in shape and is still clearly visible, whilst the foundations of the shell keep are largely buried. Traces of the castle bailey have been identified in the nearby playing field.

== History ==
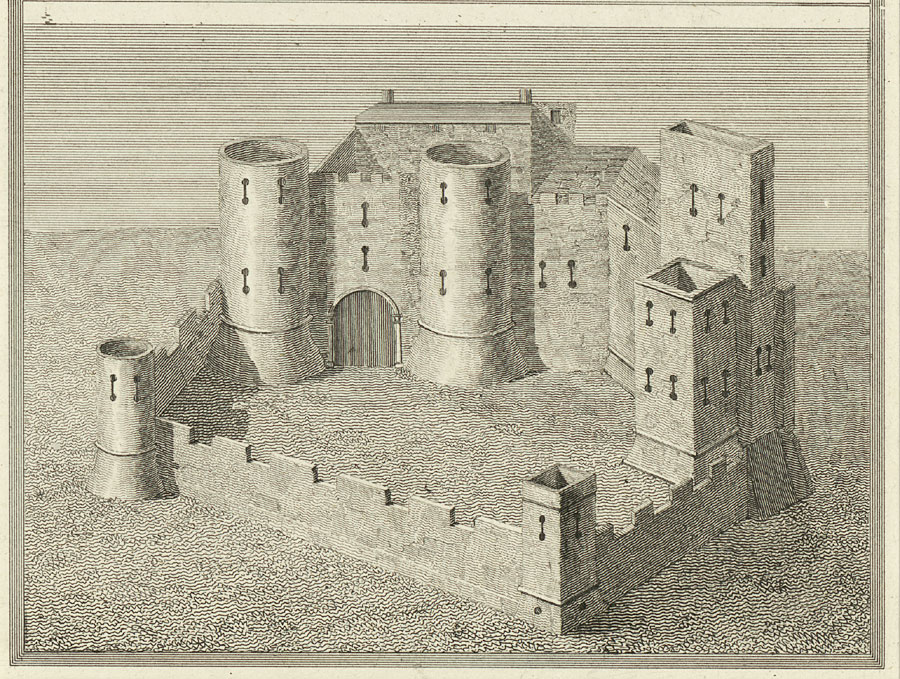
Engraving of Crickhowell Castle by James Basire (1805)

The castle was initially a motte and bailey castle built from around 1121, probably by Robert Turberville, a member of the notable Norman family, who at the time was a tenant of the Marcher lord Bernard de Neufmarché. In 1172 it was attacked by Welsh rebels, led by one Seisyllt ap Rhirid. Henry de Turberville (died 1239), the son of another Robert, was Seneschal of Gascony in the years 1226–1231 and again in 1237–1238, and Crickhowell Castle was held at the time by a Richard Turberville. Edmund de Turberville is recorded as lord of Crickhowell later in the century. Hugh Turberville, who held Crickhowell Castle from 1273, not as tenant-in-chief but as mesne lord, also held the position of Seneschal of Gascony. Hugh's services were called upon by King Edward I to train Welsh men-at-arms and transform the royal levy into a disciplined medieval army capable of conquering Wales; he led both cavalry and 6,000 infantry recruited in the Welsh Marches for King Edward's forces. He was later Constable of Castell y Bere in Merionethshire. He fought against Rhys ap Maredudd during his rising from 1287 to 1291, and died in 1293, the last of the family in the direct line.

The castle was refortified in stone from 1242 when Sybil Turberville, Hugh's daughter, married Sir Grimbold Pauncefote (or "Paunceforte"), who thus gained possession. It was walled with substantial stone towers and a large bailey, a home castle befitting an important Royal ally in Wales. The castle was in the hands of the powerful Mortimer family dynasty of Marcher Lords in the 14th century and declined as a smaller holding within a large portfolio of lands, titles and larger castles.

On the Royal command of new King King Henry IV in 1400, it was again refortified, this time by Sir John Pauncefote, great-grandson of Sir Grimbold, in advance of the uprising led by Owain Glyndŵr. The castle was largely destroyed in about 1403 by Glyndŵr's forces. who also attacked and burned Abergavenny town and other settlements in the area. It was at this time that the castle is thought to have been abandoned, subsequent stone-robbing leaving only the ruined stone double tower on Castle Green. However, 19th century illustrations suggest that its condition has deteriorated noticeably in the past century. It was listed in 1963.

The so-called "Ivy Tower", a small tower once thought to have dated from the 14th century and to be part of the castle, was found by an archaeological survey to be much later in date and nothing to do with the castle at all.
