= John Pauncefoot =

Sir John Pauncefoot (1368 – c. 1445) was the member of the English Parliament for the constituency of Gloucestershire for the parliaments of May 1413 and December 1421.
