= Thomas Berkeley (1351–1405) =

Member of the Parliament of England

Thomas Berkeley (1351–1405) was the member of Parliament for the constituency of Gloucestershire for the parliament of November 1380 and November 1390.
