= St Mary's Church, Fairford =

Medieval church in Fairford, England

St Mary's, Fairford
- Church of St Mary, High Street
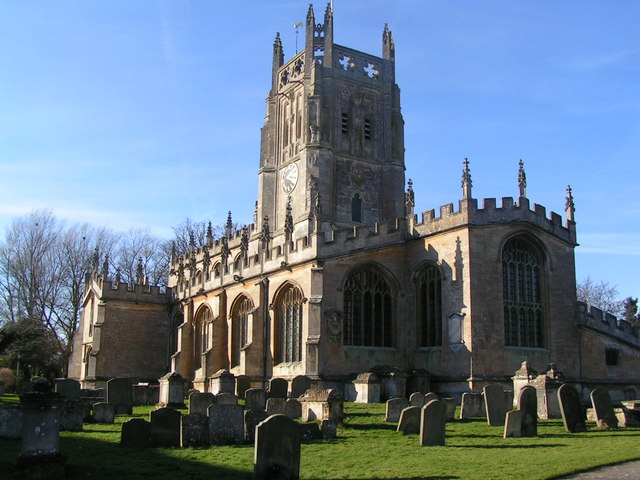
- Fairford Church, viewed from south-east
- St Mary's, Fairford
- 51.7091°N 1.7821°W
- Location: Fairford
- Country: Gloucestershire
- Denomination: Church of England

History
- Dedication: St Mary
- Consecrated: 1497; 529 years ago St Mary's, Fairford

Architecture
- Heritage designation: Grade I Listed
- Designated: 26 November 1958
- Style: Perpendicular
- Completed: 1934

Specifications
- Length: 125ft
- Width: 55ft

Administration
- Province: Gloucestershire

St Mary's Church is a Church of England church in Fairford, Gloucestershire, England. It is notable for its complete set of 28 medieval stained-glass windows, one of the best-preserved in England. Part of the tower dates from the early 15th century. The church was rebuilt at the end of the 15th century by John Tame (c.1430–1500), a wealthy local wool merchant. It is a Grade I listed building in the Perpendicular style.

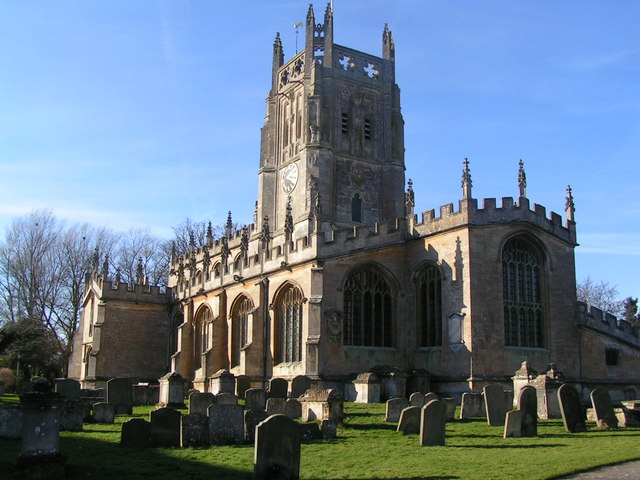
Fairford Church, built by John Tame, consecrated in 1497. Viewed from south-east

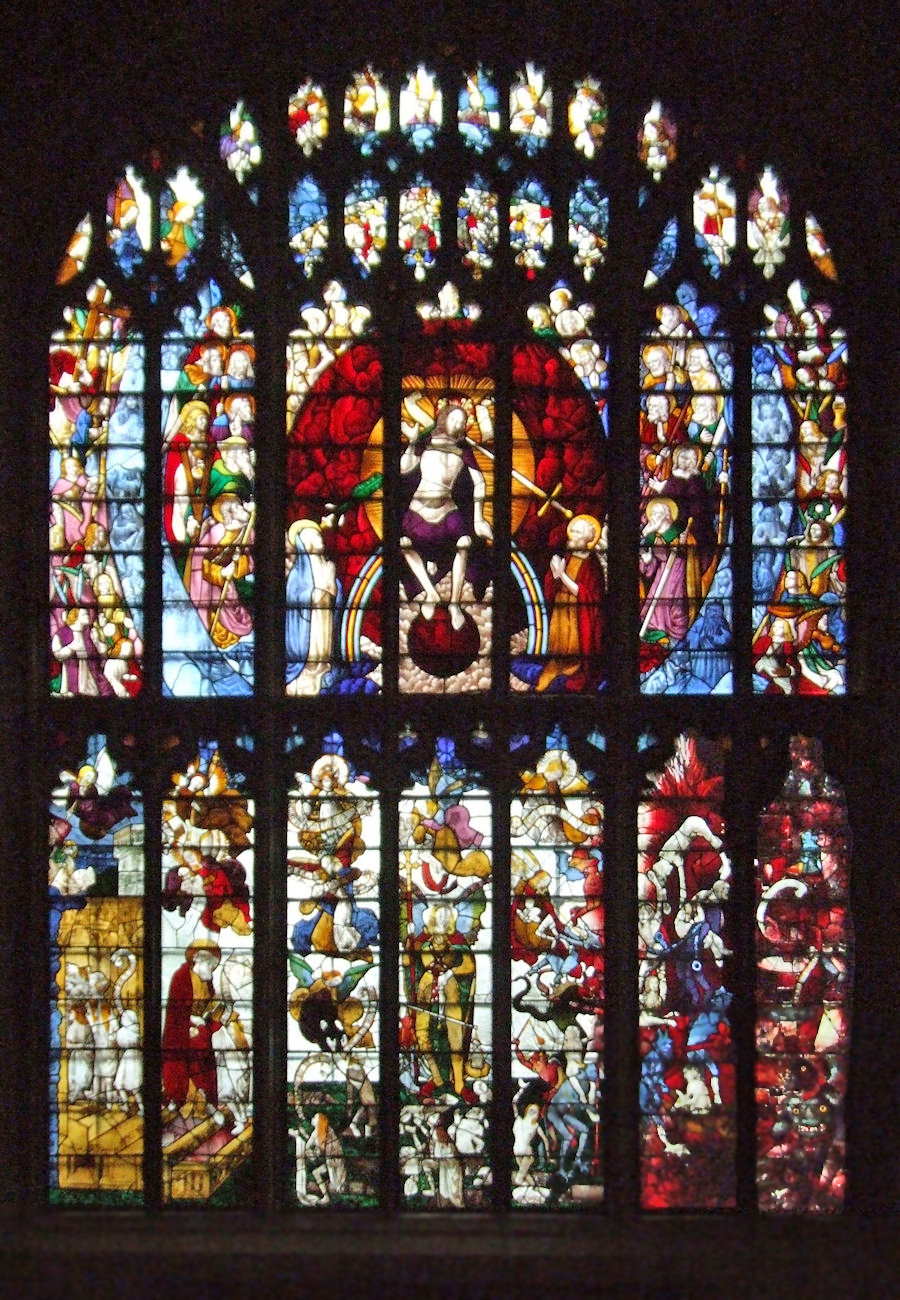
"Great West Window", Fairford Church, depicting the Last Judgement and related scenes. One of the 28 magnificent Fairford stained glass windows installed in his church by John Tame

== Interior ==
Tame rebuilt the church purposely to install his stained glass, and thus the design is "necessarily somewhat cramped". The church was consecrated in 1497 by the Bishop of Worcester, within whose diocese lay most of Gloucestershire at that time. It consists of a chancel, nave, a tower between them, and two aisles, which extend without any external break to about half the length of the chancel. According to Neale "This arrangement, necessary to secure the required number of windows, somewhat injures the effect of the exterior, and makes the distinction between chancel and nave less marked than might have been wished". The entire length is 125 feet, and the breadth is 55 feet.

The fittings of the church are of the most beautiful and costly character. The chancel is furnished with fourteen elaborate misereres, and a rood-screen, and lateral parcloses of exquisite design and in remarkable preservation. The whole floor is paved in chequers of blue and white marble; and the roof of every part is excellently carved wood, with good corbels both for the principal and secondary rafters. The north aisle is the manorial chapel of the Tames and of their successors as lords of the manor of Fairford.

== Exterior ==
The tower is the principal feature on the exterior: its plan is square, the edges however being taken off and adorned with niches. There is a pierced embattled parapet, with four angular pinnacles. There are four heraldic shields on the greater string course, in bold relief. That on the western side is charged with the arms of Tame; that on the north bears: Quarterly, first and fourth, a bend; second and third, a fret (Despencer, Earl of Gloucester). On the south is Chequy, a chevron (Newburgh, arms borne by Thomas de Beaumont, 6th Earl of Warwick and later quartered by Beauchamp, Earl of Warwick); and on the east Three chevronels for de Clare, Earl of Gloucester, who all at some time owned the manor of Fairford. There is an elaborate south-western porch, with a parvise over it. This has been since thrown open to the church, and is furnished with a projecting gallery, which serves as a pew.

== Churchyard ==
The churchyard includes a stone memorial to Tiddles, the church cat who fell off the church roof. There is also a stone grotesque to commemorate a young boy who climbed up the walls of the church and jumped, falling to his death. The churchyard contains eight Commonwealth war graves; three British Army soldiers, a Royal Navy seaman and a Royal Air Force airman of World War I and two British soldiers and a Home Guardsman of World War II.

== Stained-glass windows ==
The pre-Reformation medieval stained glass panes are of national historical and architectural importance as they constitute what is "probably the most complete set of medieval stained glass in Britain", consisting of 28 windows displaying biblical scenes. They were added after the church was rebuilt in the 1490s by John Tame, under the instructions of his son Edward Tame. The glass was made between 1500 and 1517 and the panes now attributed to the Flemish glazier Barnard Flower (d.1517), glazier to King Henry VII. According to some sources, John Thornton of Coventry and Galyon Hone were also associated with the Netherlandish Renaissance painted glass at this church.

The glass survived the destruction that was common during the Reformation and the English Civil War in a more complete state than at any other parish church in England. Some of the panes were damaged during a storm in November 1703 and those were repaired and modified or replaced.

During the Second World War, the stained glass windows were removed and stored in a cellar for safekeeping from 1939 to 1945. A conservation and restoration programme began in 1988 and finished in 2010. Clear glass now protects the old glass.

== Monument to John Tame ==
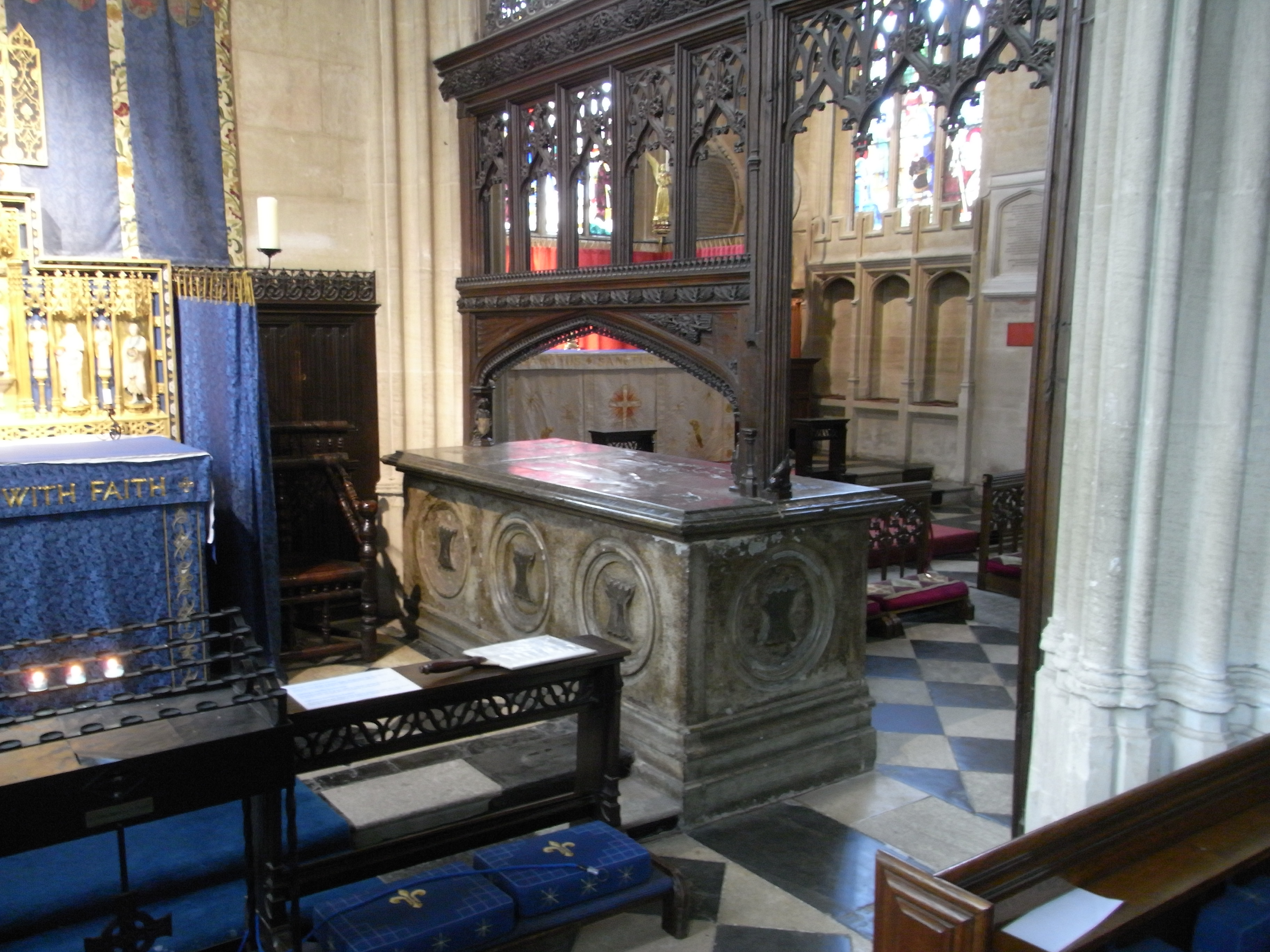
Chest tomb, "Founder's Tomb", of John Tame (d.1500), St. Mary's Church, Fairford. Viewed from within the Tame Chapel

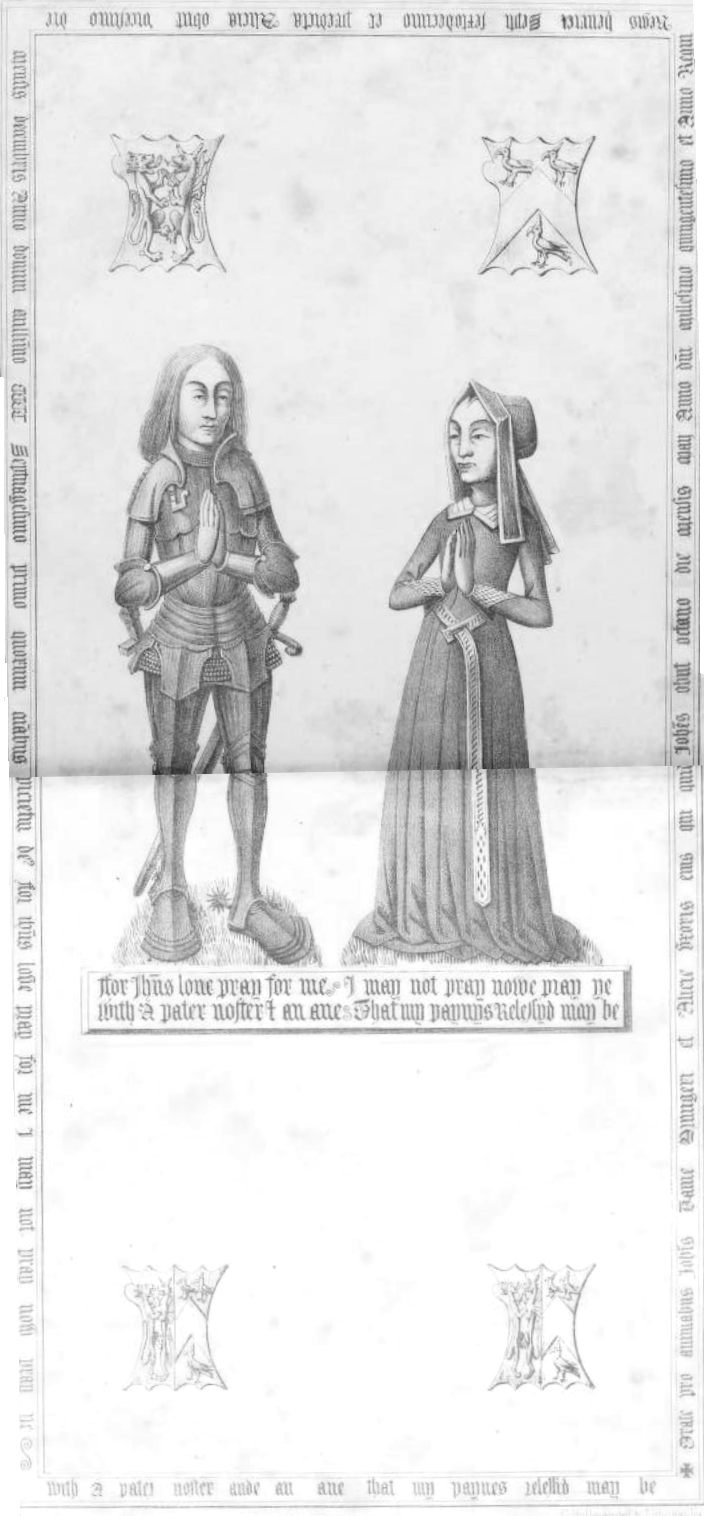
1846 drawing of ledger stone of John Tame

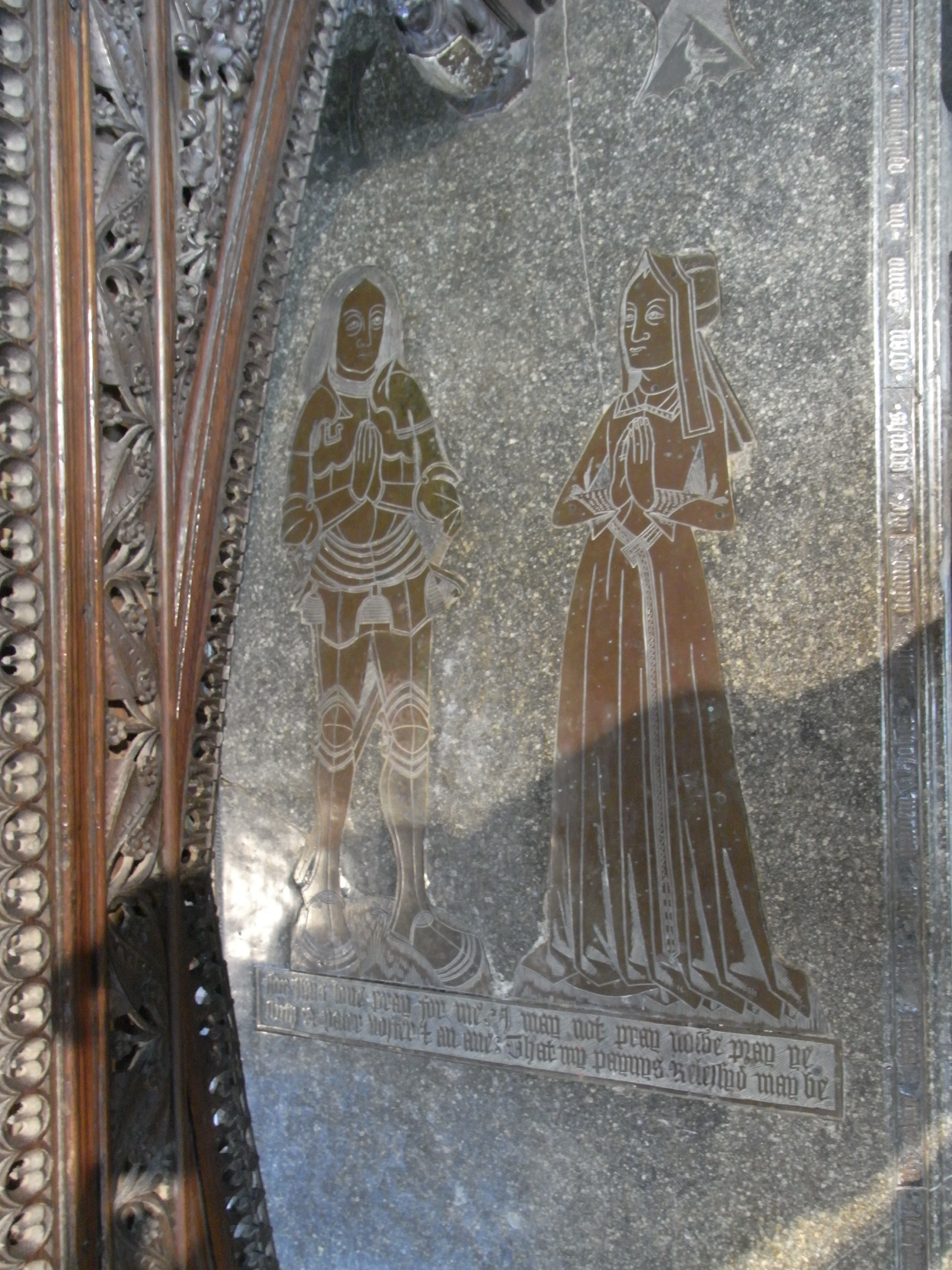
Photograph of ledger stone of John Tame

The monument to John Tame consists of a chest tomb on the north side of the chancel (the most usual burial-place for a founder), under the arch which opens into the north aisle or Tame Chapel. Over the chest tomb is an elaborately carved wooden parclose screen in the form of a Tudor arch, spanning the length of the monument, and supported by corbels in the form of angels bearing open books. The length of the Purbeck Marble slab on top is six feet nine inches; the breadth, three feet seven inches; and the height, three feet six inches. The north and south, the longer, sides have each three heraldic shields, in circular panels; on both, from east to west, the shields display the following arms: (1) Twynihoe, (2) Tame, (3) Tame impaling Twynihoe. The west displays the arms of Tame. On the ledger stone on top of the chest tomb are various monumental brasses, set into the slab, the main ones showing John Tame and his wife standing facing each other. Above John Tame are sculpted in relief into the marble the arms of Tame: Argent, a dragon vert, a lion azure crowned gules, combatant. The shields were originally enamelled in colours, but few traces remain: the dragon, however, is clearly vert, and his tongue gules.

Above the figure of his wife Alice Twynyho are sculpted the arms of Twynyho: Argent, a chevron between three lapwings sable. The two arms are impaled in the two similarly sculpted shields, one at the feet of each brass figure. It is remarkable that the wife should be represented with so old a face, since her death preceded her husband's by nearly thirty years. Her dress is peculiarly simple and elegant, with the exception of the wired head-dress, which is "of an early and unpleasing form". The ledger line is inscribed in Latin and English, unusually with lettering designed to be read from the outside instead of in the usual way, as follows:

Orate pro animabus Joh(an)is Tame Armigeri et Aliciae uxoris eius quidem Joh(an)es obiit octavo die mensis Maii anno D(o)m(ini) millensimo quingentensimo et anno regum regis Henrici Sept(im)i sextodecimo et predicta Alicia obiit vicesimo die mensis Decembris anno Domini mill(ens)imo CCCC septuagesimo primo quorum a(n)i(m)abus propicietur Deus. Ffor Jh(es)us love pray for me I may not pray nowe pray ye with a Pater Noster & an Ave that my paynes releisid may be (which may be translated as: ""Pray for the souls of John Tame Esquire and Alice his wife, which John died on the eighth day of the month of May in the year of our Lord the 1500th and in the year of the reign of King Henry the seventh the 16th, and the aforesaid Alice died on the twentieth day of the month of December in the year of our Lorde the 1471th on the souls of whom may God look on with favour")

Below the two figures is repeated in verse the words almost identical to the final inscription on the ledger line:

"Ffor Jh(es)us love pray for me,
I may not pray nowe pray ye,
With a Pater Noster & an Ave,
That my paynys releisyd may be".

== Sources ==
- Neale, John Mason, (ed.) Illustrations of Monumental Brasses, No.VI, Cambridge, Cambridge Camden Society, 1846, pp. 115–132
- Joyce, Rev. J.G., On The Fairford Windows, 1872, pp. 15–40, history of Tame family.
- Gloucestershire Notes & Queries: Monumental Brasses, pp. 141–149 & 99–103.
- Davis, Cecil T., The Monumental Brasses of Gloucestershire, 1899.
