= Fairford (disambiguation) =

Fairford is a town in Gloucestershire, England.

Fairford may also refer to:

- Fairford, Alabama, United States, an unincorporated community
- Fairford, California, United States, an unincorporated community
- Fairford (electoral district), Manitoba, Canada
- Fairford River, Manitoba, Canada

== Associated with the English town ==
- Fairford stained glass, noted 16th century stained glass panels
- Fairford railway station, a former station
- Fairford Town F.C., a football club
- RAF Fairford, Royal Air Force station
