= Ready Token =

Hamlet in Gloucestershire, England

Coordinates: 51.739109°N 1.84847°W

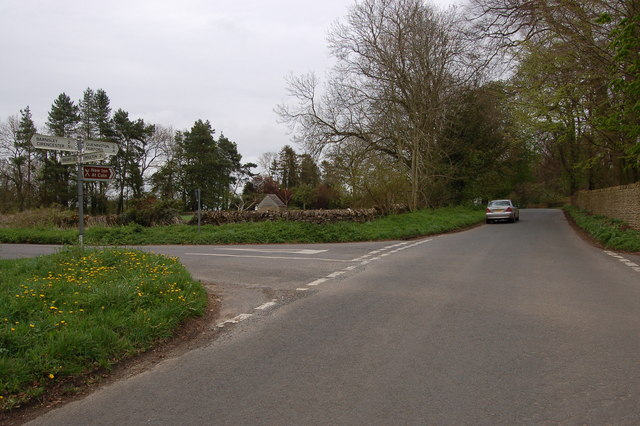
The crossroads at Ready Token looking towards Fairford in 2008

Ready Token is a hamlet in Gloucestershire, England, located in the Cotswold Hills near Poulton. Despite comprising only a handful of houses it is located at a high point and is notable for being the meeting place of six country roads and nine parish boundaries. It lies at the intersection of the ancient drove road known as the Welsh Way and the Roman Akeman Street. It once possessed an inn, recorded in 1738 as under the sign Ready Token Ash.

The name is a fusion of the Celtic word rhydd and the Saxon word tacen meaning the way to the ford. The ford being that across the River Coln at Fairford.

It is the site of an unusual house which has a butterfly shaped plan which mirrors the local butterfly shaped road pattern. It was designed by the Arts and Crafts movement architect, Norman Jewson, and built in 1928–1929. In 2025, it was given away in a prize raffle.
