= Fairford stained glass =

Netherlandish style of glass painting in St Mary's Church, Fairford, Gloucestershire

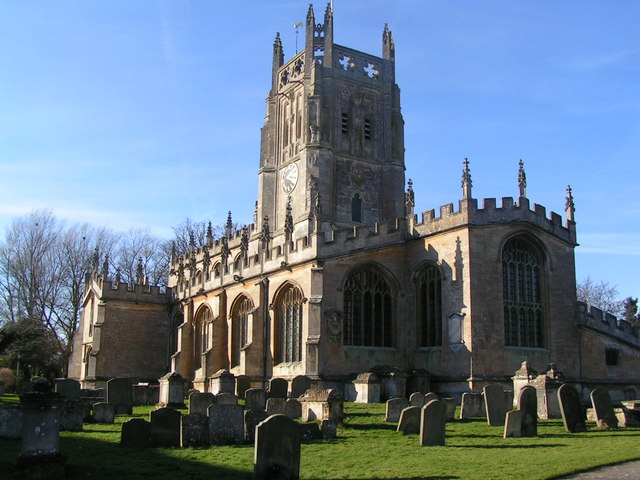
St Mary's Church, Fairford, Gloucestershire, built by John Tame (d. 1500), consecrated in 1497. Viewed from south-east. Home of the Fairford stained glass windows

The Fairford stained glass is a set of 28 pre-Reformation windows in St Mary's Church, Fairford, Gloucestershire. The medieval stained-glass panes are of national historical and architectural importance as they constitute what is, according to Gloucestershire Historic Churches Trust, "the most complete set of mediaeval stained glass in the country", consisting of 28 windows displaying biblical scenes. They were added after the church had been rebuilt by the wealthy wool merchant John Tame (c.1430–1500). The glass was made between 1500 and 1517 under the instructions of his son, Edmund Tame.

The panes were once regarded as an example of Netherlandish-style glass painting, but are now attributed to the Flemish glazier Barnard Flower (d. 1517), glazier to King Henry VII (1485–1509), and, according to some sources, also to Galyon Hone. Several sources indicate that the overall design of the windows can probably be credited to Richard Fox, Bishop of Durham, later of Winchester.

The traditional story concerning the origin of the windows is related as follows by the Gloucestershire historian Ralph Bigland (d. 1784) in his Account of the Parish of Fairford:

"About the year 1492, soon after the Siege of Boloigne, a Vessel bound to the Port of Rome, from the Low Countries, and laden with painted Glass, is said to have been taken by him [John Tame], who instantly determined on preparing a Church here for its Reception."

Most of the 28 windows incorporate four lancets, each displaying a different but related biblical scene, beneath painted gothic canopy-work. Six smaller lights occupy the space at the apex of the gothic arched windows, usually displaying decorative features, of angels where the scenes below them are supportive of the Christian faith, and of devils where the scenes are opposed to it.

== Survival over the centuries ==
The glass survived the Reformation, during which many images in English churches were destroyed. In 1642, during the Civil War, it narrowly avoided destruction when the Roundhead army was marching on the nearby town of Cirencester. It was customary at that time for cavalry of both sides to convert churches into temporary stables and barracks with little regard for the fabric of the buildings. The more puritan elements amongst the Roundheads were opposed to pre-Reformation imagery, which they regarded as idolatrous; this made it likely that the stained glass would be destroyed. However, on the order of the quick-thinking William Oldysworth, the impropriator (lessee) of the tithes of Fairford, the windows were hurriedly dismantled and the glass concealed before the troops arrived in the vicinity. "[T]o him the Lovers of ancient Art are indebted for its present Existence" (Bigland, 1791).

It may have been during the re-erection of the glass after the Civil War that some of the panes were replaced in the wrong positions. In 1725 the glass was protected by the addition of a "lattice of wire" to each window, paid for at the great cost of £200 by Elizabeth Fermor, a daughter of William Fermor, 1st Baron Leominster (1648–1711), by his first wife Jane Barker, a daughter of Andrew Barker of Fairford. Andrew Barker was of the ancient Barker (alias De Calverhall) family of Coverall (or Calverhall) Castle and Hopton Castle, both in Shropshire, and had acquired the manor of Fairford in about 1660.

A few of the panes were damaged during a storm in November 1703; they were either repaired (some being modified) or replaced. In 1889–90 twenty-six windows were repaired and re-leaded.

During the Second World War, from 1939 to 1945, the stained-glass windows were removed and stored in a cellar for safekeeping.

A conservation and restoration programme began in 1988 and finished in 2010. Clear glass now protects the old glass.

== Descriptions ==
Descriptions of the history and imagery of the windows are contained in the following sources:

- Bigland, Ralph, An Account of the Parish of Fairford, in the County of Gloucester; with a Particular Description of the Stained Glass in the Windows of the Church, Engravings of Ancient Monuments, with Inscriptions, &c. &c.. London: John Nichols, 1791, pp. 6–10
- Neale, John Mason (ed.), Illustrations of Monumental Brasses, No. VI. Cambridge: J. T. Walters and London: F. and J. Rivington, for the Cambridge Camden Society, 1846, pp. 115–132.

== Images ==
The 28 stained-glass windows in St Mary's Church, Fairford, are shown below, numbered and described by John Mason Neale (ed.), Illustrations of Monumental Brasses, No. VI, pp. 115–132.

Window no.	Image & scene title (l to r)	Description by Neale (1846)
1	Serpent's Temptation of Eve; Moses and the Burning Bush; Joshua and the Angel (Joshua 5:13–15); Queen of Sheba and King Solomon (1 Kings 10:1–13).	The Serpent tempting of Eve to eat the forbidden Fruit. God appears to Moses in the fiery Bush, and commands him to put off his Shoes, for the Ground whereon he stood was holy Ground, he being then keeping his Father in Law Jethro's Sheep. Then there is Josuah that succeeded Moses, and the Angel that guided him to War. There is Gideon's Fleece under Josuah. Next is Sheba a Queen of the South, who came to hear, and try the great Wisdom of King Solomon.
3	The Annunciation; The Nativity; The Wise Men; The Circumcision.	The Salutation of the Angel Gabriel to our Virgin Mary when she conceived in her Womb. The Almond Branch bloometh in the Flower Pot. The Birth of our Saviour lying in a Manger. The Oxen feeding in the Stalls, and the Shepherd with his Crook that brought the glad tydeings. The Wise Men that were guided by the Star, came to offer Gifts to our Saviour sitting in his Mother's Lap, Gold, Myrrh and Frankincense. Here is listening Herod that desired the Wise Men when they found our Saviour should come and tell him, that he might worship him, but God put it into their Hearts, that they went into their own Countrey another way. Next is the Circumcision of our Saviour when he was eight days old, Simeon receiving him in the Temple, the Purification of Mary offering a pair of Turtle Doves to him in a Cage.
4	Flight into Egypt; Assumption of the Virgin Mary; Jesus disputing with the Doctors in the Temple.	God warned Joseph to take the young Child and his Mother to fly into Egypt from the Destruction of Herod. There is the Asse that carryed them. There is likewise Mary with the Babe in her Lap, and Joseph gathering the Fruit from the Tree to feed them in the Wilderness, the Branches being so high that he could not reach, an Angel in the Tree bowed them down to him. There is the Destruction of the Male Children. Herod destroyed all the Male Children that were two Years old and under. There is the Assumption of our Virgin Mary, and the Antient of Days over it. There is Joseph and Mary seeking our Saviour after the Feast at Jerusalem, and could not find him. At last they found him disputing with the Doctors in the Temple, both hearing and asking them Questions.
5	The Crucifixion (East Window)	Our Saviour riding to Jerusalem on Palm Sunday. Zacheas strewing Branches under his Asse's Feet, the Children crying Hosannah in the highest, our Saviour praying in the Garden desireing of his Father that the Cup (if it were possible) might passe from him. He desired his Disciples to watch with him one Hour. But the Spirit was willing and the Flesh was weak, and they fell all fast asleep. Judas came into the Garden to betray our Saviour, after which his Companions took and bound him, and brought him before Pilate. There is Pilate setting in Judgement against him. He called for a Bason of Water to wash his hands from the Blood of that Just Person. He would have nothing to do with it. Here are the Jews that cryed crucifye, crucifye him, let his blood be upon us and our children. Here he is scourged by one and spit in the Face by another. Next he bears his Crosse, and there are the two Theives that are to be crucifyed with him. Over is his Inscription where he is fastened on the Crosse, the penitent Theife on the right Hand, and the blasphemer on the left. There is Mary and other Women that followed aloft after to see it done, and the Roman Souldiers on Horseback to see the Execution.
6	Descent from the Cross; Entombment of Christ; Harrowing of Hell	Here is Joseph of Arimathaea that begged the body of our Saviour, which he is taking down from the Crosse. There is the Print of the Nayles in his Hands and Feet, and the Crown of Thornes that is platted about his Head. There is Nicodemus stands ready to receive him to lay him in the Sepulchre. Here they are laying him in the Sepulchre, Mary and other Women lamenting over him. There is the Darkness that came over the Face of. the Earth at the ninth Hour. There is St. Michael the Arch-Angel fighting with the Devil and his Angels, and overcoming them, and there is Beelzebub peeping thro' the Fiery Grate.
7	Christ visiting his Mother on Easter Morning; The Transfiguration; Noli me Tangere	The Transfiguration on the Mount, Moses and Elias with the 2 Tables of the ten Commandments. Here they are going to anoint his Body for his Buryal with the Box of Oyntment which his Disciples asked why it was not sold and the Money given to the Poor. How they are anointing him in the Sepulchre, to which when they came they saw the Stone rolled away from the Door of it, and looking in they saw an Angel sitting in the midst of it asking them, why they came to seek the living among the dead, our Saviour was risen and gone. There is the Napkin that was about his Head. His first Appearance after his Resurrection was unto Mary, out of whom he cast seven devils. He beckened with two of his fingers, that she should not touch him, because he was not yet ascended to his Father. He appeared unto Mary in the Garden, and she did not know him, but took him to be the Gardener, and there is the Garden and Pyramids of Egipt.
8	The Risen Christ	2 panels with Christ breaking bread at Emmaus, 2 panels with the 'doubting Thomas' scene
9	Miraculous Draught of Fishes; Ascension from Mt of Olives; Pentecost	Here they were fishing all night, and could catch nothing. Our Saviour walking on the shore commanded them to cast the Net on the right side of the Ship. Then they inclosed such a multitude of Fishes, that the Net was ready to break. There is a Fire and a Gridiron with Fish broyling on it. Next is our Saviour's Ascension into Heaven. He was taken off of Mount Olivet into the Cloudes, and only the print of his feet left behind. All those under the Mount are gazeing up into Heaven after him. When he departed from them he said he would not leave them comfortless, but would send them a Comforter at the Feast of Pentecost, at which time being all gathered together in one place, the Holy Ghost descended upon them in the likeness of a Dove.
10	One of three windows portraying the Twelve Apostles and sentences from the Apostles' Creed	Four panels depicting Saint Peter, Saint Andrew, Saint James the Great and Saint John the Apostle
11	One of three windows portraying the Twelve Apostles and sentences from the Apostles' Creed	Four panels depicting Saint Thomas, Saint James the Less, Saint Philip and Saint Bartholomew
12	One of three windows portraying the Twelve Apostles and sentences from the Apostles' Creed	Four panels depicting Saint Matthias, Saint Simon, Saint Jude and Saint Matthew
13	Four Great Fathers of the Church	(l to r): Saint Jerome (347–420); Saint Gregory the Great (540–604); Saint Ambrose (340–397); Saint Augustine (354–430)
14	Judgement of David	King David sitting in Judgment against the Amalekite for cutting off King Saul's Head
15	Last Judgement (Great West Window)	In the great West Window is our Saviour sitting in a Pillar of Fire upon the Rain-bow, and the Earth is his Foot-Stoole, having in one Hand the Sword of Vengeance, and a Lilly in the other, and all the Cherubins and Hoast of Heaven sitting round about him in the upper part of the Window. In the lower is St. Michael with a Ballance of Equity weighing the good Souls and the bad, and there is the general Resurrection, some riseing out of their Graves, with their Cloaths on their backs, and some on their Arms, and the Angels are assisting them up towards Heaven, and there is Peter with the Keys of Heaven to let them in, and when they passe from thence they are cloathed all in white, and crown'd with Crowns of Glory. On the other side is Hell, in which is the great Devill, with large red and white Teeth. Some are going to Hell head-long, others on the Devil's back a pick-back. Here is Dives holding up his Hand to Lazarus for him to dip his Finger in Water to coole his Tongue, and there is Lazarus in Abraham's bosome.
17	The Four Evangelists	Mathew, Marke, Luke and John, the four Writers of the Gospell.
25	Persecutors of the Church	(Probably Maxentius with the head of St Catherine; possibly King of the Huns; Herod murdering an innocent; with devils above.)
26	Wicked Priests	(Annas offering money to Judas, Judas putting it into his bag, Caiaphas counting 30 pieces of silver. With devils above.)
