= John Tame =

English wool producer and merchant

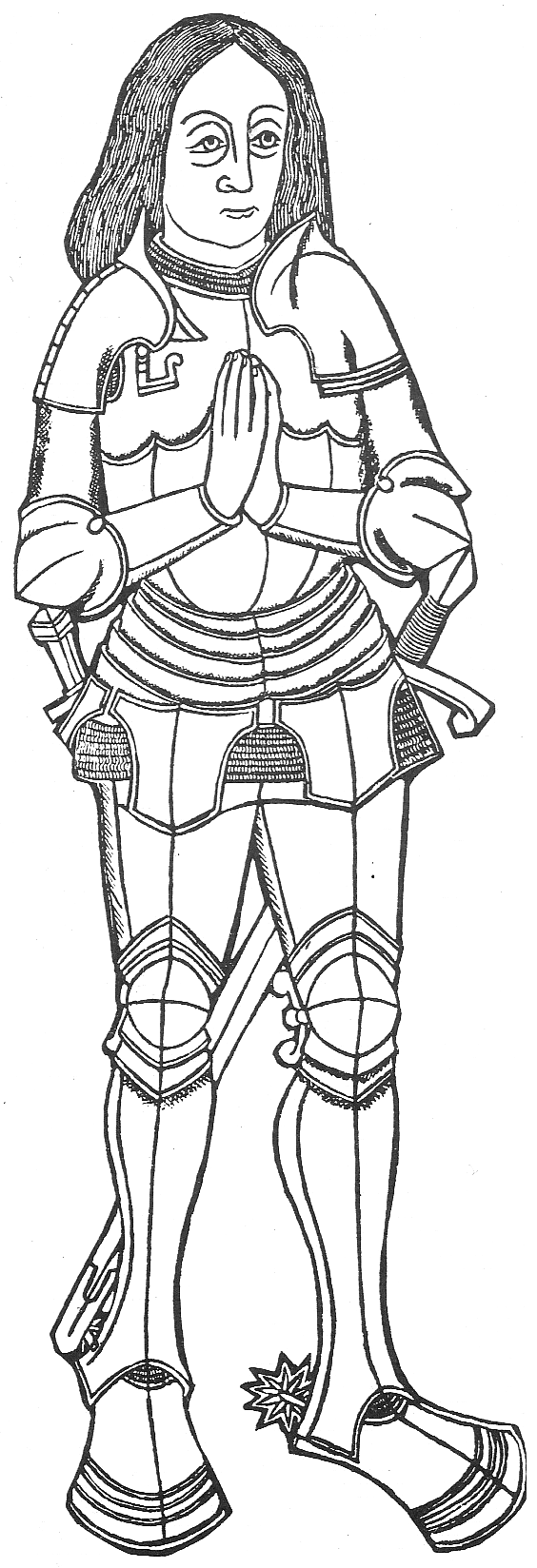
Rubbing of monumental brass of John Tame, St. Mary's Church, Fairford. He is shown wearing full armour, as an esquire and member of the gentry, not as a merchant dressed in fur-trimmed robes

Arms of Tame: Argent, a dragon vert and a lion azure crowned gules combatant, as seen in Fairford Church

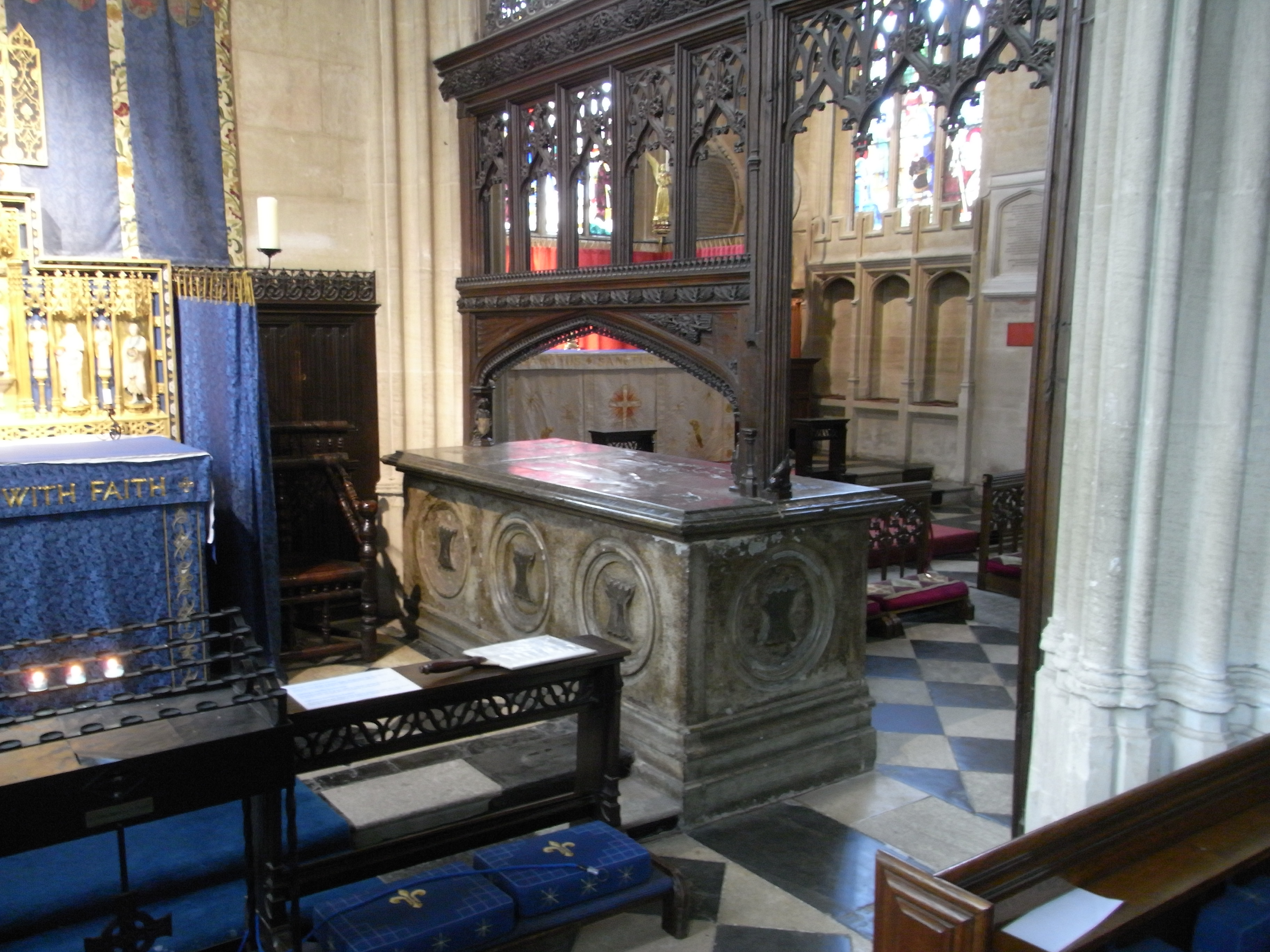
Chest tomb, "Founder's Tomb", of John Tame (d.1500) and his wife, St. Mary's Church, Fairford. Viewed from within the Tame Chapel

John Tame (c. 1430 - 8 May 1500) of Cirencester and of Beauchamp Court (or "Warwick Court") in the parish of Fairford, both in Gloucestershire, England, was a wealthy wool producer and merchant who re-built the surviving St. Mary's Church, Fairford, the former structure of which had been built by one of the Beauchamp Earls of Warwick in the 15th century. The 28 Fairford stained glass windows he installed in the church are considered amongst the finest and most complete in England. He and his son Sir Edmund Tame (d.1534) so fostered the trade transacted at Fairford, that it came to rival that of the nearby long-established town of Cirencester, which increase was remarked upon by his contemporary the antiquary John Leland (d.1552): "Fairford never flourished afore the cumming of the Tames into it".

== Origins ==
According to his near contemporary the antiquary John Leland (d.1552), John Tame "came out of the house of Tame of Stowel" and "The elder house of the Tames is at Stowell, by Northleche in Gloucestershire". The Tames of Stowell were wool merchants and cloth dealers, already well established in the early 15th century. John Tame (d.1500) was one of the two sons of John Tame of Stowell, the other son being Richard Tame who went to Calais or the Netherlands to conduct the foreign branch of the family's wool trade. The parish of Stowell in the Cotswold Hills is one of the smallest in Gloucestershire. The manor of Stowell, within the parish, was inherited by the senior line of the Tame family long after the Tames of Fairford rose to prominence, when Thomas Tame (died c. 1545), a sheep breeder, inherited it from his mother Agnes Limerick, daughter and heiress of Thomas Limerick (d.1486) of Stowell, and husband of William Tame.

== Career ==
John Tame was a merchant of the City of London, and according to the Gloucestershire historian Ralph Bigland (d.1784), served as Sheriff of the City of London. In 1492, soon after the siege of Boulogne (1491), Tame, presumably sailing under letters of marque, captured a vessel bound for Rome from the Low Countries. It is stated by Neale (1846) that the captured ship was carrying a beautiful set of twenty-eight stained-glass windows, intended for a present to the Pope and that Tame brought the glass, and the workmen who were accompanying it, to England, and in order to display it fittingly, decided to rebuild the parish church at Fairford "on a plan of costly magnificence, suited to the beautiful windows which he intended thus to consecrate to God." This task he commenced in 1493. However it is now believed that the glass was in fact made at Westminster by the Flemish glazier Barnard Flower (d.1517), glazier to King Henry VII (1485-1509), and thus the story of the glass having been seized from a foreign ship is inaccurate.

=== Acquires Fairford ===
In 1479 John Tame, together with the Cirencester lawyer and clothier John Twynyho (d.1485), had obtained a lease of the demesne of the manor of Fairford from King Henry VII, to whom the manor had temporarily reverted during the minority of Edward Plantagenet (1475-1499) (later 17th Earl of Warwick), son of George, 1st Duke of Clarence, 1st Earl of Warwick (d. 1478) by his wife, the heiress of Fairford, Isabel Neville. Isabelle Neville was one of the daughters and co-heiresses of Richard Neville, 16th Earl of Warwick (d.1471) "The King-Maker" by his wife Anne Beauchamp, 16th Countess of Warwick (d.1492), who inherited Fairford on the death of her niece Anne de Beauchamp (d.1449), daughter of Henry de Beauchamp, 1st Duke of Warwick (d.1446), whose mother was Isabel le Despenser (d.1439). John Tame (or his son) memorialised these noble families which had been connected with the manor of Fairford (de Clare, Despencer, Beauchamp) by the inclusion of their armorials (together with those of Tame) on the tower of Fairford Church.

Tame also acquired the manor of Rendcomb, Gloucestershire, by grant from the Crown, to which it had reverted after the attainder of the Earl of Warwick. His son Sir Edmund Tame rebuilt Rendcomb Church. In 1497 John and his son Edmund Tame levied a fine of land in Hatherop, an adjacent village. John Tame died before he had completed the rebuilding of Fairford Church, which task was finished by his son Edmund.

John Tame's business headquarters were at Cirencester, and his great wealth derived from the production and sale of wool, which came from his vast flocks of sheep for the grazing of which he secured large tracts of land. Amongst the many bequests in his will were those to four of his "head shepherds" at various places.

== Fairford Church ==
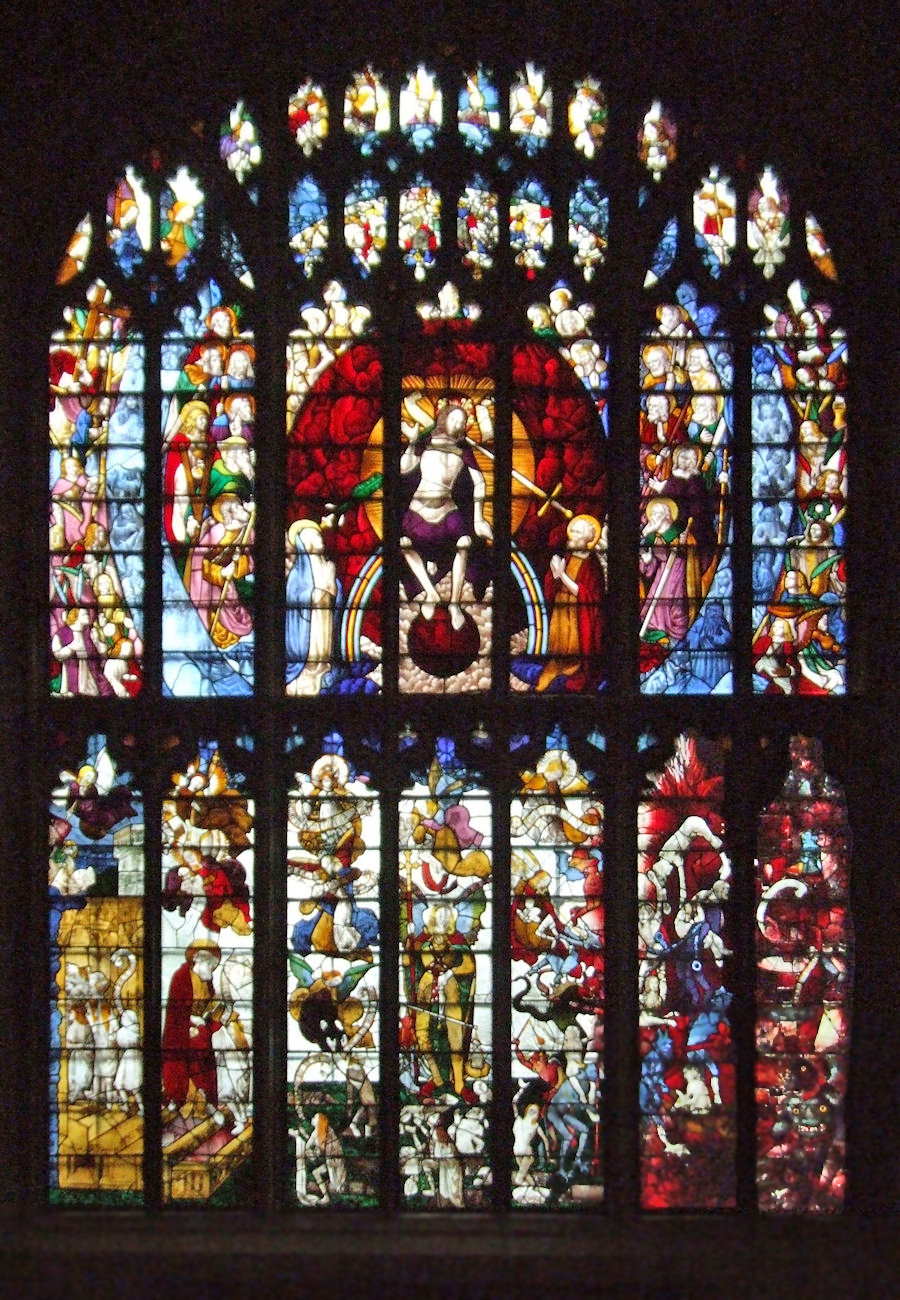
"Great West Window", Fairford Church, depicting the Last Judgement and related scenes. One of the 28 magnificent Fairford stained glass windows installed in his church by John Tame

John Tame built Fairford Church purposely for the reception of his stained glass, and thus the design is "necessarily somewhat cramped". Twenty-eight stained glass windows survive, considered amongst the best in England of the period. The church was consecrated in 1497 by the Bishop of Worcester, within whose diocese lay most of Gloucestershire at that time.

== Marriage and progeny ==
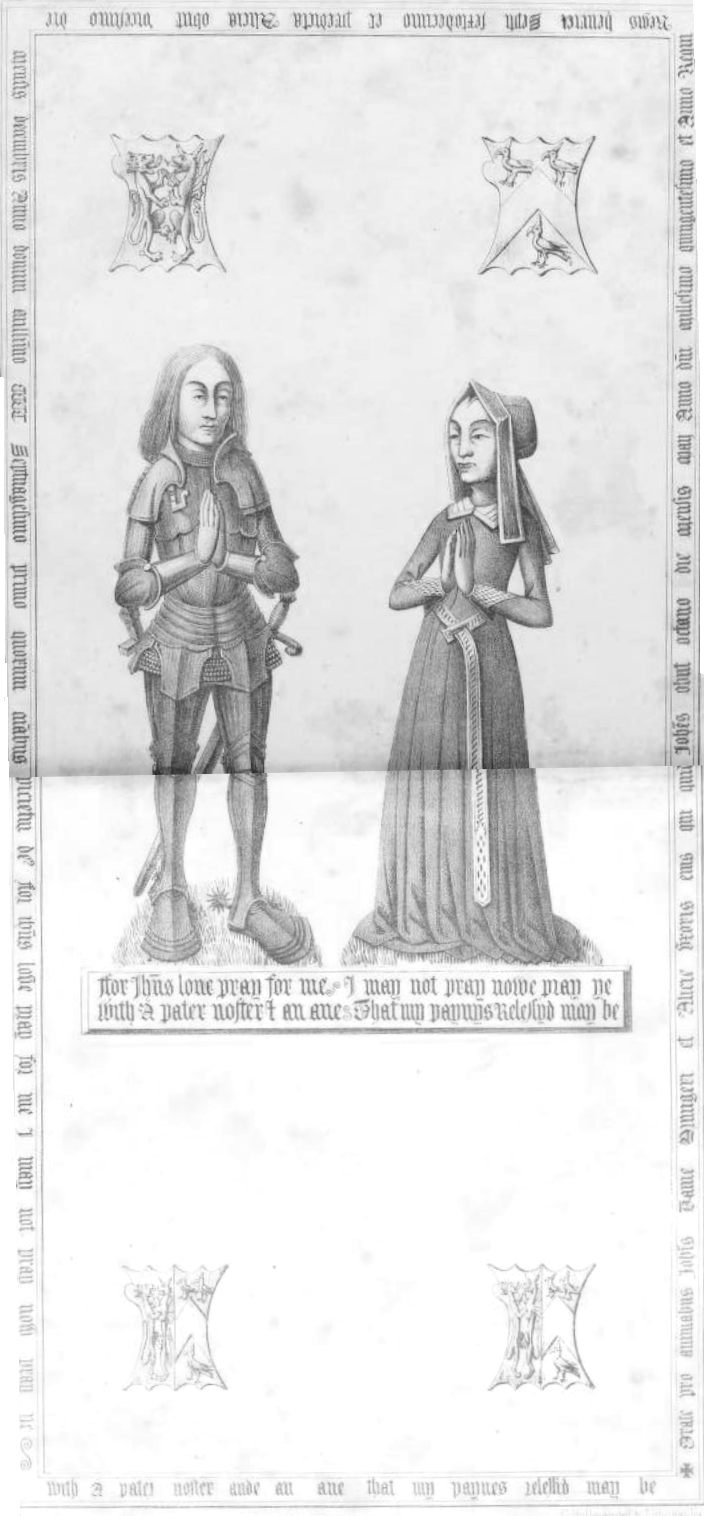
1846 drawing of ledger stone of John Tame and his wife Alice

He married Alice Twynyho (d. 20 December 1471) a daughter of John Twynyho (d.1485), a lawyer and cloth merchant of Cirencester who had acquired the lease of Fairford in partnership with John Tame, whose monumental brass survives in Lechlade Church, Gloucestershire. By his wife he had progeny as follows:

- William Tame, eldest son, disinherited by his father;
- Sir Edmund I Tame (d.1534) of Rayton, second son and heir, a courtier and Knight of the Body of King Henry VIII, knighted by King Henry VIII in 1516, Sheriff of Gloucestershire in 1505 and 1513, and father of Edmund II Tame. He was Steward of Cirencester Abbey and lived in a large mansion house in the market place of Cirencester. He married twice: firstly to Agnes Greville (d.1506) (by whom he had four children) a daughter of John Greville of Milcote, Warwickshire and a sister of Sir Edward Greville and a descendant of William Greville (d.1401) of Chipping Campden, "the flower of the wool merchants of all England"; secondly to Elizabeth Tyringham, a member of the Tyringham family of Tyringham in Buckinghamshire, without progeny; He completed the rebuilding of Fairford Church and also rebuilt Rendcombe Church. He is commemorated by two different monumental brasses in Fairford Church, which duplication is unique in the county of Gloucestershire.
- Thomas Tame, a priest, parson of Castle Eaton (alias Castleton) in Wiltshire, in which parish the Tames held land.
- Eleanor Tame, who married and survived her husband;

== Death and legacy ==
John Tame died in the year 1500, seised of Fairford and Rendcombe. By his will dated 1497 he assigned £240 to found a chantry in Fairford Church but later used the money to buy land in Castle Eaton, Wiltshire, for its endowment.

== Monument ==
John Tame is buried in Fairford Church in a chest tomb on the north side of the chancel (the most usual burial-place for a founder). On the ledger stone on top of the chest tomb are various monumental brasses, set into the slab, the main ones showing John Tame and his wife standing facing each other.

== See also ==
- Monumental brasses of Gloucestershire

== Sources ==
- Bigland, Ralph, Historical, Monumental, and Genealogical Collections relative to the County of Gloucester, Vol. 1. Bristol and Gloucestershire Archaeological Society, 1989. p. 571. (Illustration.)
- Bigland, Ralph, An Account of the Parish of Fairford in the County of Gloucester. London: Printed by John Nichols for Richard Bigland, 1791. pp. 11–12
- "B.W."; Neale, John Mason (ed.) Illustrations of Monumental Brasses, No.VI. Cambridge: Cambridge Camden Society, 1846. pp. 113–132
- Davis, Cecil T. Monumental brasses of Gloucestershire. Gloucestershire Notes & Queries. London: Philimore & Co., 1899. pp. 98–103, 141–149
- Holt, Henry F., "The Tames of Fairford". Journal of the British Archaeological Association, No.27, 1871, pp. 110–148.
- Maclean, Sir John (ed.), Visitation of the County of Gloucester Taken in the Year 1623 by Henry Chitty and John Phillipot. London: 1885. p. 260. (Pedigree of Tame)
