= John Twynyho =

English lawyer, merchant and member of parliament

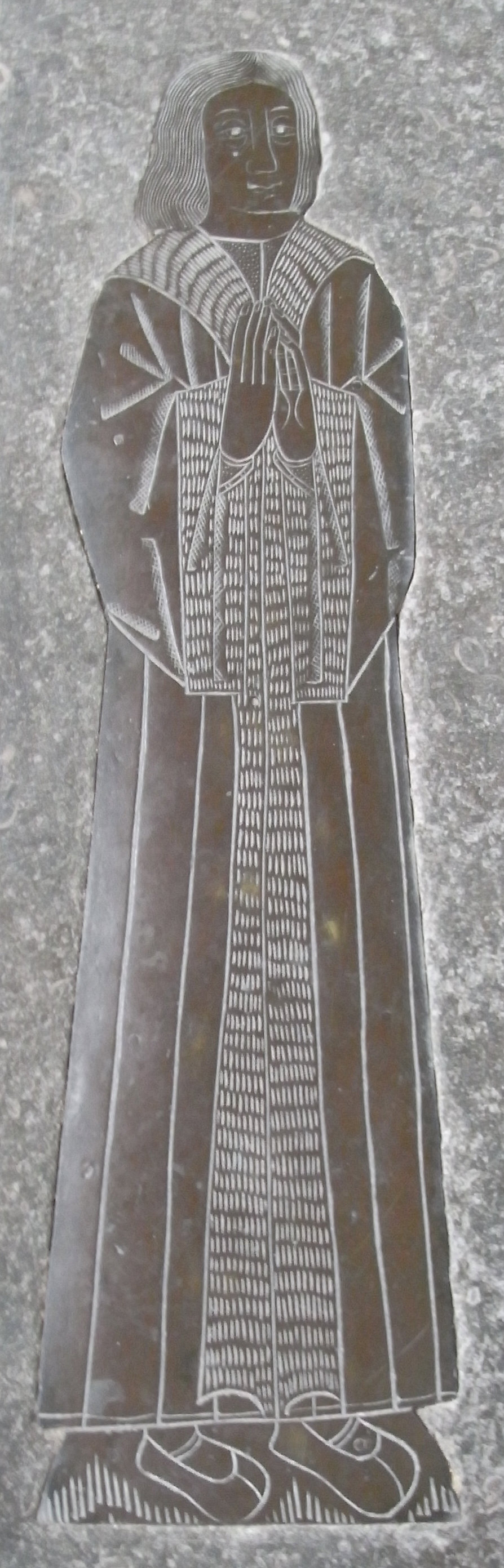
Monumental brass of John Twynyho (died 1485), Lechlade Church, Gloucestershire, set into his ledger stone on floor of north aisle

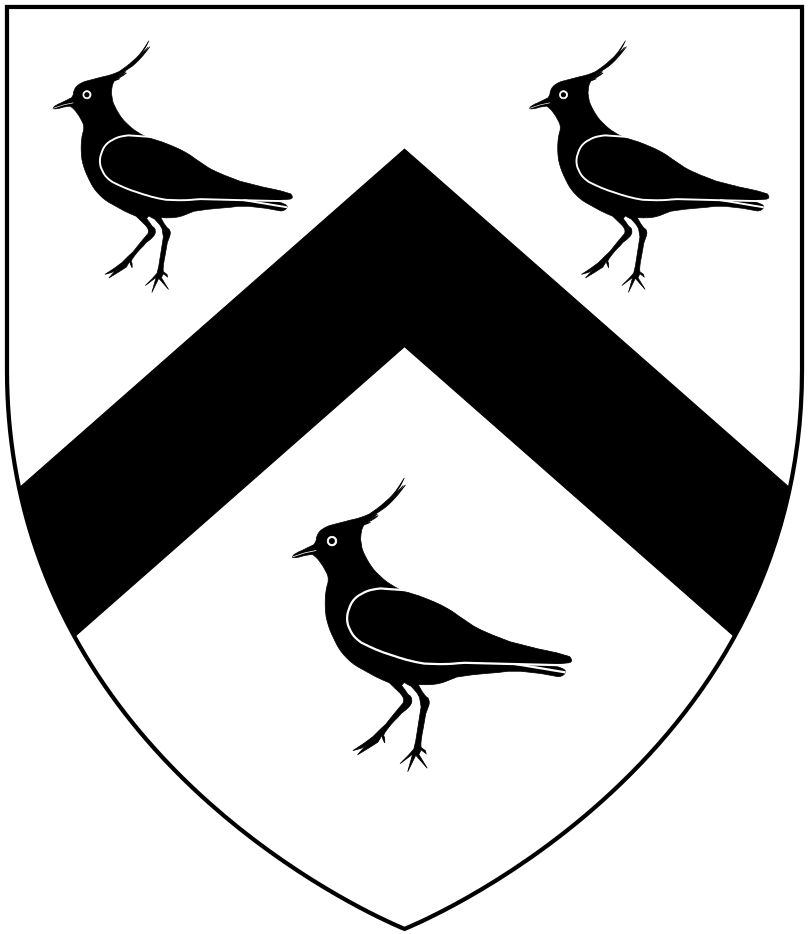
Arms of Twynyho: Argent, a chevron between three lapwings close sable. As seen on the "Founder's Tomb" in Fairford Church, Gloucestershire, in which his daughter Alice Twynyho rests next to her husband John Tame (died 1500), builder of the church

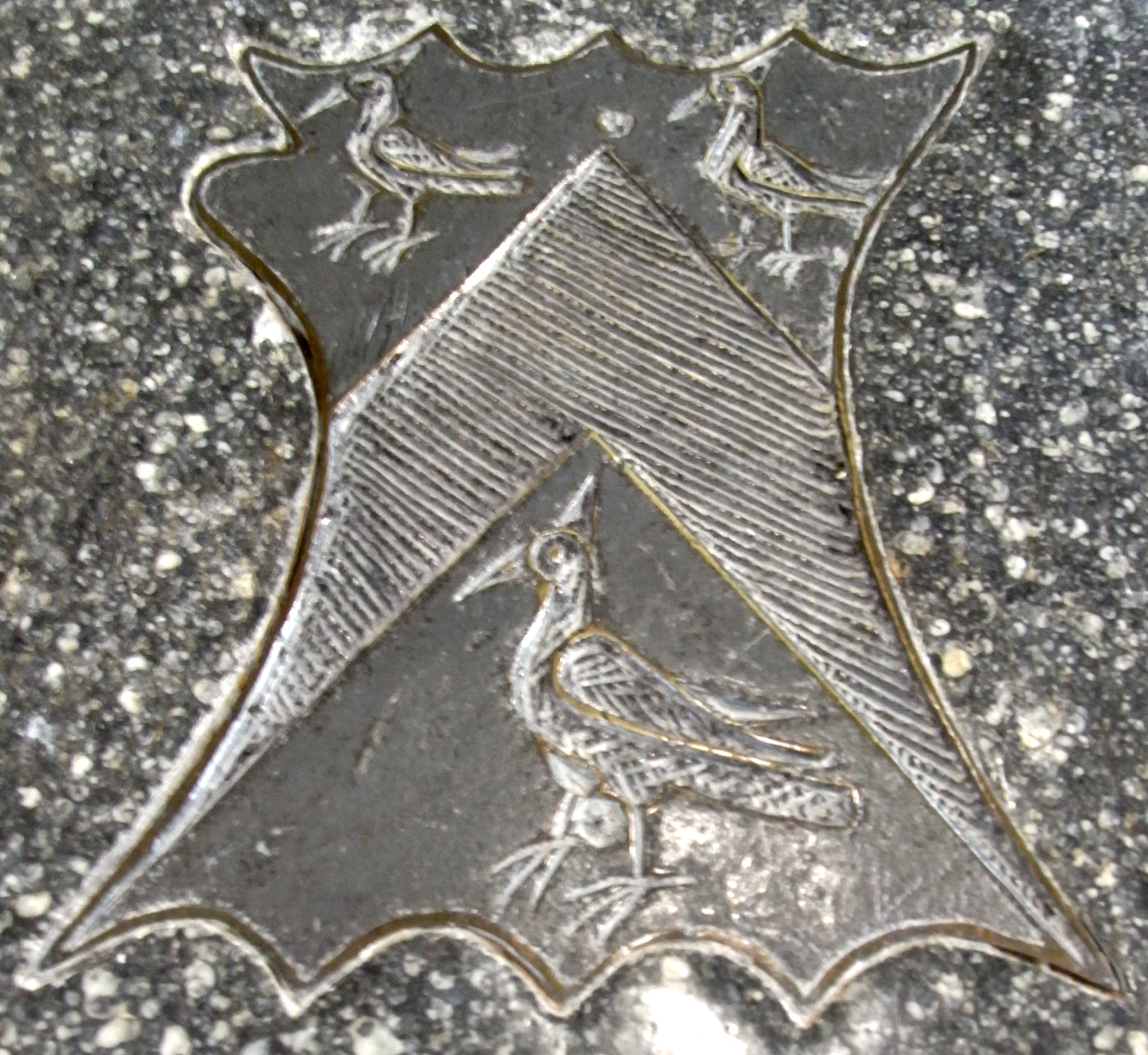
Twynyho arms, engraved into the purbeck marble ledger stone on top of the chest tomb of John Tame (d.1500), Fairford Church, Gloucestershire. They are also shown impaled by Tame

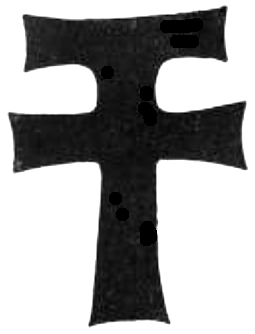
Merchant's mark of John Twynyho (d.1485), A Tau Cross combined with a Latin Cross, as indicated by the shape of the matrix of the missing monumental brass at the top of his ledger stone in Lechlade Church

John Twynyho (c. 1440 – 30 September 1485) (alias Twynyhoe, Twynihoe, etc.) of Cirencester, Bristol and Lechlade, all in Gloucestershire, was a lawyer and wealthy wool merchant who served as Recorder of Bristol, as a Member of Parliament for Bristol in Gloucestershire in 1472-5 and in 1484 and for the prestigious county seat Gloucestershire in 1476. In 1478 he was Attorney General to Lord Edward (the future King Edward V (1483–1483), eldest son and heir of King Edward IV.

== Origins ==
He was the second son of William Twynyho of Keyford (today the "Old Nunnery", Lower Keyford), near Frome in Somerset, by his wife who was a daughter and co-heiress of the Cobington family. John Twynyho's sister-in-law Ankaret Twynho (née Hawkeston), the wife of his elder brother William Twynyho of Keyford, had been a servant of Isabel Neville, Duchess of Clarence (died 1476), a daughter and co-heiress of Richard Neville, 16th Earl of Warwick (1428–1471) The Kingmaker, whose death in childbirth had been blamed by her husband George Plantagenet, Duke of Clarence (executed 1478), on a poisoning by Ankaret. Clarence was determined to have Ankaret executed, against the wishes of the Queen, who believed her to be an elderly and harmless widow blamed unjustly. Clarence rapidly gave orders for her arrest, which was performed at her home at Kefford the family home, on 12 April 1477 by Richard Hyde and Roger Strugge and 80 "riotous persons", whence she was taken to Bath, thence to Cirencester thence to Warwick, where she was tried before Justices of the Peace at Warwick Guildhall and found guilty by a jury. She was hanged at Mytton, Warwickshire on 15 April 1477, which action is considered by modern historians to have been a notorious judicial murder. Clarence himself was executed in the Tower of London the following year, on 18 February 1478, and two days later on 20 February 1478 Ankaret's grandson Roger Twynyho obtained the king's annulment of Ankaret's conviction.

== Career ==
Twynyho was in partnership with the wool merchant John Tame (died 1500), the builder of Fairford Church in Gloucestershire and a favourite of King Henry VII, and the pair had expanded their sheep, wool and cloth business in a bold fashion by acquiring large amounts of sheep rearing land, including Fairford in 1479.

On 8 November 1472 he was granted a licence by Cecily Neville, Duchess of York (1415–1495), wife of Richard Plantagenet, 3rd Duke of York and mother of King Edward IV (1461–1483), to found a perpetual chantry in Lechlade Church, Gloucestershire. This he founded in honour of Saint Blaise. In about 1464 Cecily, Duchess of York had been granted by her son the king the advowson of the Hospital of St. John the Baptist, Lechlade, an Augustinian Priory founded in 1246 by Isabella de Mortimer. In 1472 she founded a chantry for three chaplains to celebrate divine service daily in the Chapel of the Virgin in the parish church of Lechlade, and John Twynyho's licence was granted by her at the same time.

In 1484 he was chief steward of the lordship of Thornbury in Gloucestershire, former seat of Henry Stafford, 2nd Duke of Buckingham (1454–1483), executed for treason in 1483, when the manor was forfeited to the crown.

It appears the Denys/Twynyho relationship may have started in 1481 on the sale or other transfer by Sir Walter Denys of the manors, or an interest therein, of North Cheriton and South Cheriton, Somerset, to the Twynyho/Tame wool-merchant partnership, which manors had been inherited from Sir Walter's grandmother Margaret Russell, daughter of Sir Maurice Russell (died 1416) of Dyrham. The following entry in the Somerset Feet of Fines records the transaction:

At Westminster in the quinzaine of St. Hillary between Cristofor Twynyho cleric, John Twynyho of Cirencestre esquire, William Twynyho of Shipton Solers esquire, John Tame of Fayreford esquire, Edmund Langeley of Sudyngton Langeley esquire, Thomas Delalynde of Clencheston esquire, John Walshe of Olveston esquire, William Lovell of Raffeston esquire, and Thomas Warner of Cirencestre esquire querents; and Walter Denys esquire and Agnes his wife deforciants; for the manor of Northcheryton and the advowson of the free chapel of South-cheryton (and lands in Glouc. and Dors.). Walter and Agnes acknowledged the right of John Twynyho as by their gift and quit claimed for the heirs of Agnes, and they warranted against Richard abbot of the monastery of St Mary Cirencestre and his successors; for this John Twynyho gave them six hundred pounds sterling.

- Christopher Twynyho was steward of Shaftesbury Abbey, Dorset, of which his sister Margery was Abbess (1496–1505). Shaftesbury was the second wealthiest Abbey in the land, behind only Glastonbury Abbey. The will of John Twynyho (died 1485) bequeaths to this "Dame Margery, my niece, nun of Shaftesbury" a silver & gilt goblet "which had been presented to him by George, Duke of Clarence". This familiarity with the Duke suggests that John was the son or grandson of Ankarette.
- William Twynyho (died 1497) of Shipton Solers, Glos., was the 2nd son of William Twynyho of Keyford and served as MP for Weymouth 1472-5 had acquired that manor in right of his wife Catherine Solers (died 1494), daughter of John Solers. The manor descended to his son Walter Twynyho.
- Edmund Langley of Siddington, Gloucestershire, about 1 mile south of Cirencester was the husband of Lady Elizabeth Beynham (died 1527/8), widow of Sir Alexander Beynham of Mitcheldean, Forest of Dean, son of Sir Thomas Baynham and Alice Walwyn. Alice Walwyn, as widow of Sir Thomas, was the 4th and last wife of Sir Walter Denys (died 1505). Edmund Langley's will was dated 1490.
- Thomas Delalynde of Winterborne Clenston, Dorset, was married to Edith Twynyho, daughter of William Twynyho (died 1472) of Keyford, Somerset, by Ankaret. He was living at Warwick, presumably as part of the retinue of Isabel, Duchess of Clarence, and the couple were summarily ordered to leave Warwick by order of the Duke of Clarence during the trial of Ankaret, as the petition to the king made by Roger, Ankaret's grandson, reveals.
- John Walshe (died c. 1492) of Olveston, and Little Sodbury Glos., appears to have acquired Olveston in 1472 from Sir Walter Denys, father of William, who is buried in the middle of the choir of Olveston Church, as the Denys monumental brass there states. In 1490 Walshe was appointed King's Receiver of the estates of William, Marquess Berkeley, uncle of Anne Berkeley, Sir William Denys's 2nd. wife, when he alienated his estates to King Henry VII. His son John II Walshe was King's Champion at the coronation of Henry VIII, and was a great favourite of the young king's. John I Walshe's daughter Catherine married George Huntley (died 1580) of Frocester, MP for Cricklade, eldest son of John Huntley of Standish by Alice Langley, daughter of Edmund Langley of Siddington. George Huntley's brother John married Jane Carne, daughter of Sir Edward Carne (died 1561), husband of Anne Denys, daughter of Sir William Denys.

== Acquires Hall Court, Lechlade ==
In 1461 John Twynyho and his wife Agnes acquired the manor of "Hallecourte" in the parish of Lechlade, Gloucestershire, as is recorded by the following deed:

"Richard Sutton of Lecchelade co. Gloucester, husband of Thomasine daughter of Thomas Savernake of Lecchelade, to John Twynyho and Agnes his wife and to the heirs and assigns of the said John. Quitclaim with warranty of the manor of 'Hallecourte' in the town, fields and territory of Lecchelade, and of all his lands, rents, reversions and services, hays, ways, paths, stews, stanks, waters, fisheries etc. there. Witnesses: Edmund Hungerforde knight, Walter Langley, Robert Poyntz, William Twynyho, Thomas Bradway esquires, Thomas Lymeryk, John Tame, Richard Janyvere. Dated 20 August, 1 Edward IV (1461)".

This may have been the same property as "Butler's Court", a 4-yardland estate which in 1304 had been granted by John de Bellew to John Butler. John Twynyho of Cirencester was lord of Butler's Court in 1479.

== Marriage and children ==
He married twice:

- Firstly to a certain Agnes, who is recorded as his wife in several deeds.
- Secondly to Eleanor Cheney, who survived him and remarried to a Strangeways, as is recorded in an ancient deed dated 1491:

"On the Quindene of St. Martin. 7 Hen. VII. Between Robert Willoughby de Broke, Knight, Elizabeth Colshyll, and Alianora Strangways, widow, late the wife of John Twynyho, complainants, and Hugh Erdeswyke and Cecilia Erdeswyke, widow, deforciants of the manors of Bromshulf, Amulcote, Legh, Strongshulf, Austansfeld, and Hope, and the advowsons of the churches of Bromshulf and Legh; also fifty messuages, 1,500 acres of land, 100 acres of meadow, 500 acres of pasture, and eighty acres of wood in Bromshulf, Amulcote, Legh, Strongshulf, Austansfeld, and Hope. Hugh and Cecilia remit all right to the complainants and heirs of Elizabeth, for which the complainants gave 1,000 marks of silver."

The second and third parties (Elizabeth Colshyll, and Alianora Strangways) appear to have been Elizabeth Cheyne (wife of Sir John Coleshill) and her sister and co-heiress Eleanor Cheyne (wife of Thomas Strangeways). The first party acting with them, Sir Robert Willoughby de Broke, was the nephew of these two women, his own mother having been Anne Cheyne, another of the sisters and co-heiresses. Thus John Twynyho's wife appears to have been Eleanor Cheyne, a daughter of Sir Edmund Cheyne (1402–1430) of Brook in the parish of Westbury in Wiltshire, Member of Parliament for Wiltshire in 1429, by his wife Alice Stafford (1405–1448), a daughter of Sir Humphrey Stafford of Hooke, and an aunt of Humphrey Stafford, 1st Earl of Devon (died 1469). However this Eleanor is stated in some sources to have been Eleanor Talboys, a daughter of Walter Talboys of Kyme (1391–1444) by his wife Alice Stafford (1405–1448), a daughter of Sir Humphrey Stafford of Hooke, and an aunt of Humphrey Stafford, 1st Earl of Devon (died 1469). This Eleanor Talboys is said to have married Thomas Strangeways (c.1430–1484) of Stinsford, Dorset, MP for Great Bedwyn, Wiltshire.

Sir Edmund Cheyne (1402–1430) of Brook was the eldest son and heir of Sir William Cheyne (1374–1420) of Brooke, MP for Dorset in 1402, by his wife the Devonshire heiress Cecily Stretche. Sir William Cheyne (1374–1420) was the son and heir of Sir Ralph Cheyne (c. 1337–1400) of Poyntington in Somerset and of Brook (three times a Member of Parliament for Wiltshire, Deputy Justiciar of Ireland, Lord Chancellor of Ireland, and Deputy Warden of the Cinque Ports) by his wife Joan Pavely, daughter & co-heiress of Sir John Pavely of Brook. Eleanor Cheyne's sister Anne Cheyne was the mother of Robert Willoughby, 1st Baron Willoughby de Broke (1452–1502), of Brook.

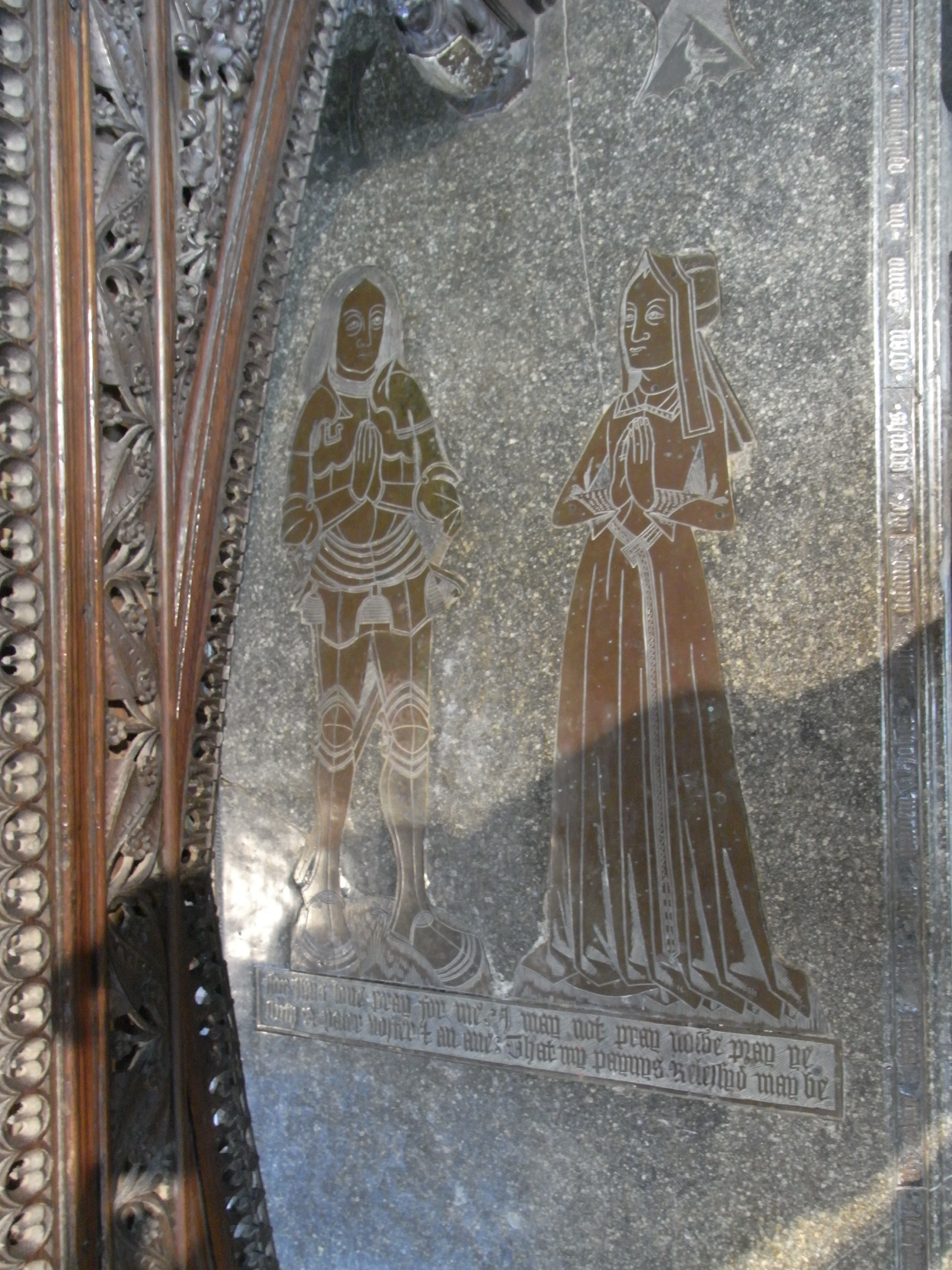
Monumental brass of Alice Twynyho (d.1471) and her husband John Tame (d.1500), "Founder's Tomb", Fairford Church, Gloucestershire. The arms of Twynyho are shown above Alice's figure

John Twynyho's children included:

  - Sir William Twynyho, Master of the Hospital of St Thomas, Southwark in Surrey.
  - Edith Twynyho, who in about 1482 married Sir William Denys (1470–1533) of Dyrham, Gloucestershire, later a courtier of King Henry VIII and High Sheriff of Gloucestershire in 1518 and 1526. She died soon after her marriage, having produced a daughter Anne Denys, who died childless. In about 1508 Denys remarried to Anne Berkeley, a daughter of Maurice Berkeley, de jure 3rd Baron Berkeley (1436–1506) of Thornbury in Gloucestershire. Denys's daughter Katherine Denys (d.1560) married Edmund II Tame (d.1544) of Fairford, the grandson of John Tame (d.1500), partner of John Twynyho, and her effigy survives in Fairford Church.
  - Alice Twynyho (d.1471), wife of John Tame (d.1500) of Fairford, Gloucestershire, her father's partner and builder of Fairford Church. The monumental brass of the couple survives on top of their chest tomb, known as "the Founder's Tomb", in Fairford Church.
  - Dorothy Twynyho, wife of Thomas Morton.

== Death, burial & legacy ==
He is said to heve been buried at Cirencester. His heir was his daughter Dorothy Moreton and his manor of Butler's Court, Lechlade, passed to her son Robert Moreton (d. 1514).

== Monumental brass ==
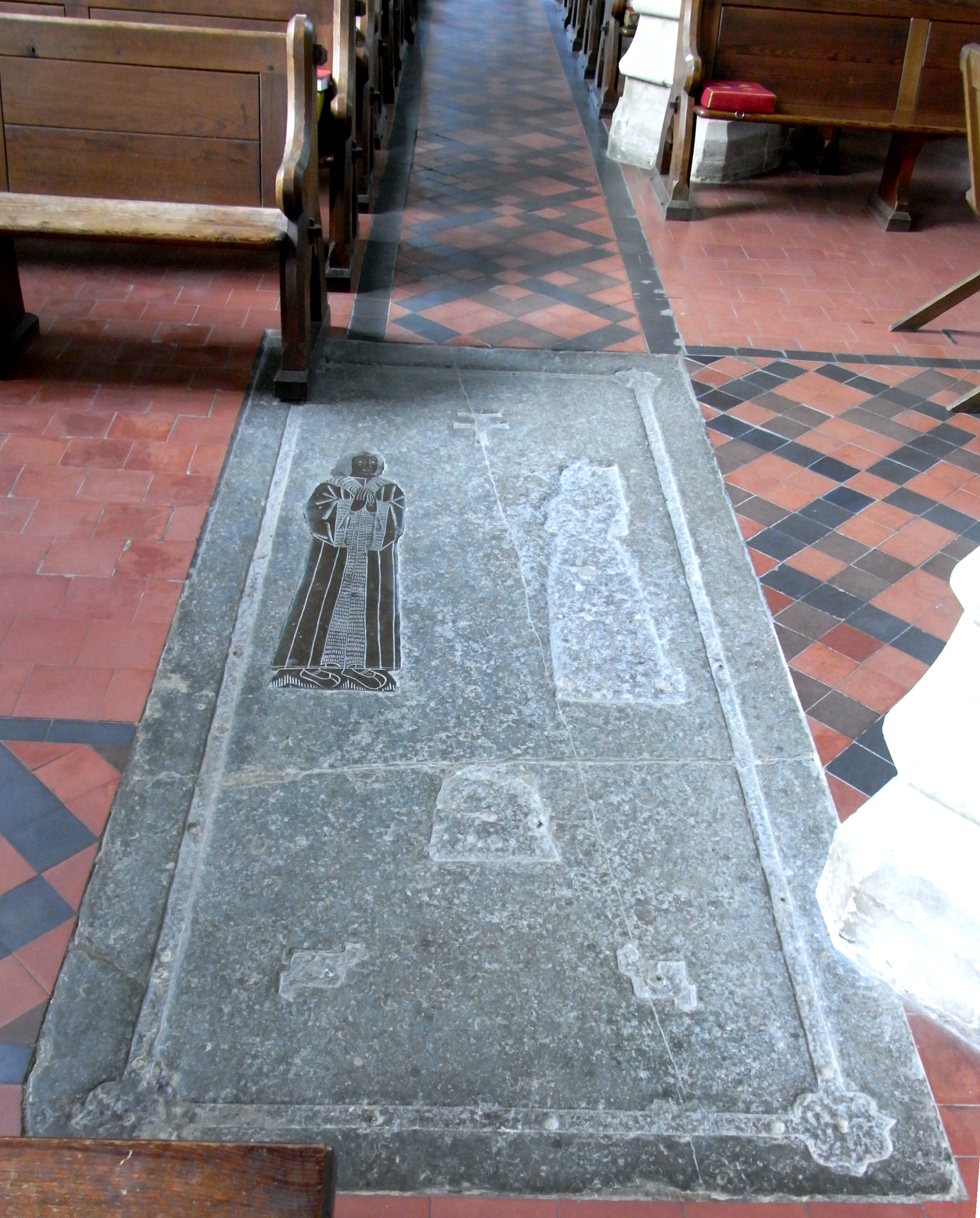
Ledger stone and monumental brass of John Twynyho, Lechlade Church

The Gloucestershire historian Ralph Bigland (d.1784) identified him with the surviving ledger stone set into the floor of the South aisle of St Laurence's Church, Lechlade, in which he had founded the chantry of St Blaise. The north and south chapels in that church are likely to have been paid for by the Duchess of York and John Twynyho to house the chantries founded in 1472. However more recently it has been suggested as the brass of Robert Hitchman (d. circa 1510). Of the many brasses the ledger stone displayed originally, including effigies of his wife, children, heraldic escutcheons, marginal inscription, two scrolls, and four plates, on which were most probably the evangelistical symbols, and his merchant's mark (a tau cross combined with a Latin cross) only that of a figure representing John Twynyho survives. Only the matrices of the other brasses indicate their positions and shapes. His brass measures 3 ft. 2in. by 9in. He wears long hair but his face is clean shaven. His tunic reaches to his ankles and is faced with fur, a customary garment among the civilians at the end of the 15th century and commencement of the 16th century. The large open sleeves hide the girdle which most probably he wore. The under-garment is seen at the neck, and again at the wrists, where its sleeves appear to be tightly buttoned. The feet are encased in the large square-toed shoes of the period. The figure is erect and slightly turned to his left with his hands uplifted in a prayerful attitude. The brass is illustrated in Ralph Bigland's Gloucestershire, Vol II, p. 144.

== Sources ==
- Visitation of the County of Gloucester Taken in the Year 1623 by Henry Chitty and John Phillipot, ed. Maclean, Sir John, London, 1885, pp. 262–3, "Twinyho".
- Holt, Anne D., & Wedgwood, Josiah Clement, History of Parliament: Biographies of the Members of the Commons House, 1439–1509, Vol. 1, London: HMSO, 1936–1938, p. 886-7, biography of John Twynyho
