= Welsh Way =

British Iron Age trade route and track-way

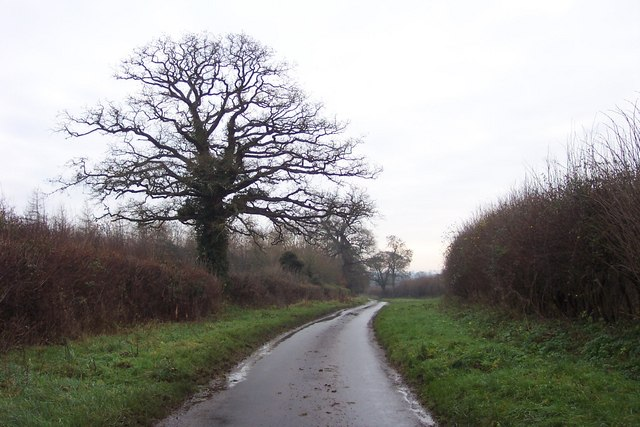
The Welsh Way as a lane to the east of Barnsley. The broad verges indicate past use as a drove road.

The Welsh Way was a British Iron Age trade route and track-way that originally carried trade between South Wales and the Oxford area of England across the Cotswold Hills. There is evidence it was utilised and improved by the Roman army following the conquest of Britain as a link between Akeman Street and the Fosse Way.

It links the highest navigable point on the River Thames at Lechlade to the lowest crossing point of the River Severn at Gloucester. Originally it had a braided nature with one route through Quenington and another through Fairford.

From the thirteenth century to the eighteenth century it was the route taken by Welsh cattle drovers to London. At this time it took the name Tame's way after a rich family of Cotswolds merchants.

The Welsh Way exists today as a named lane which leaves the Gloucester-Cirencester road before Duntisbourne and passes through Barnsley and Ready Token to Fairford and Lechlade, eventually joining The Ridgeway near Wantage.
