= Fairford =

Market town in Gloucestershire, England

Coordinates: 51.708°N 1.785°W

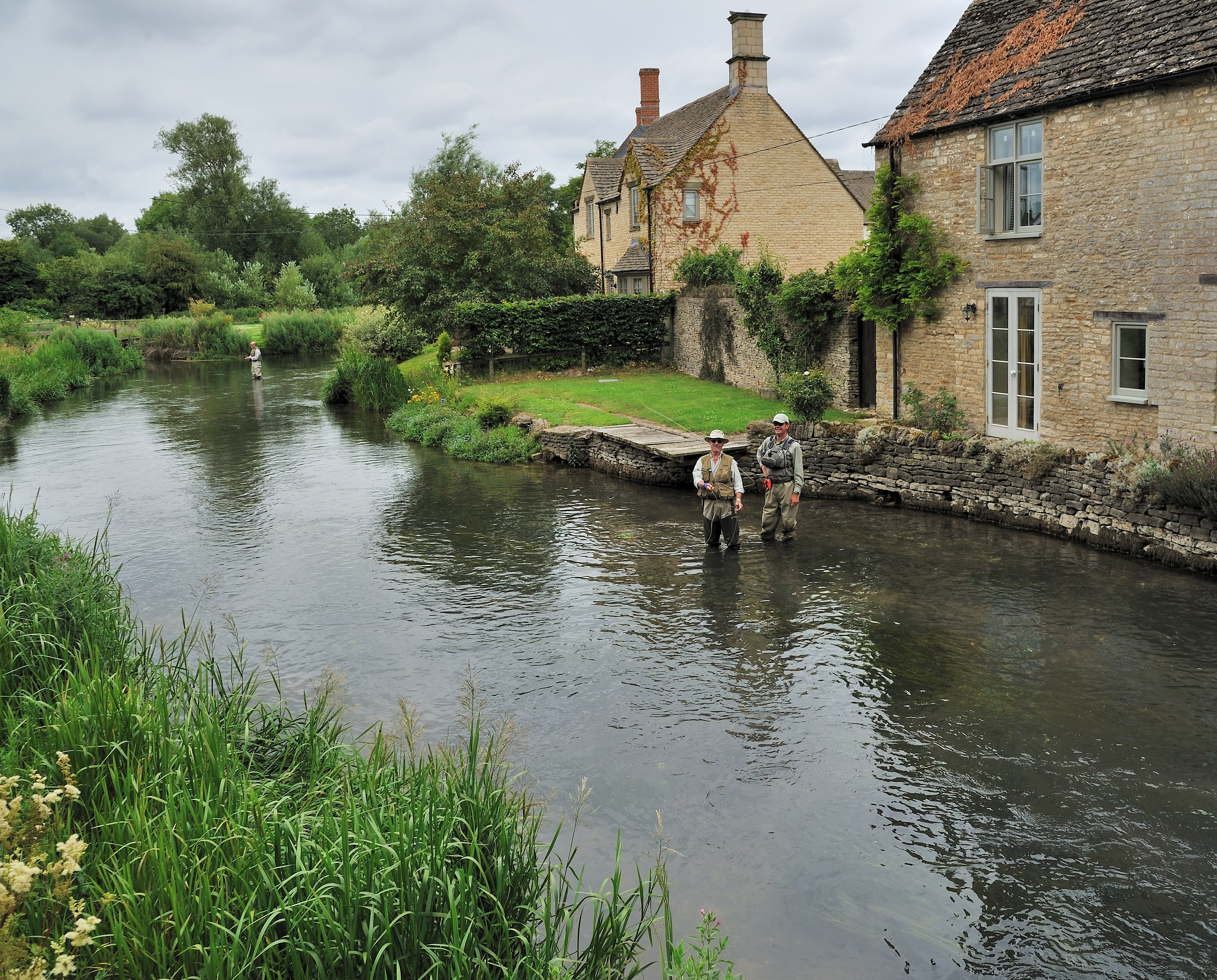
- River Coln, Fairford

- Location within Gloucestershire
- Population: 3,236 (2011 census)
- OS grid reference: SP149010
- Civil parish: Fairford
- District: Cotswold
- Shire county: Gloucestershire
- Region: South West
- Country: England
- Sovereign state: United Kingdom
- Post town: Fairford
- Postcode district: GL7
- Dialling code: 01285
- Police: Gloucestershire
- Fire: Gloucestershire
- Ambulance: South Western
- UK Parliament: South Cotswolds
- Website: Welcome to Fairford Town Council

Fairford is a market town in Gloucestershire, England. The town lies in the Cotswold hills on the River Coln, 6 miles (10 km) east of Cirencester, 4 miles (6 km) west of Lechlade and 9 miles (14 km) north of Swindon. Nearby are RAF Fairford and the Cotswold Water Park.

== Name ==
First attested as Fagrandforda in 872 CE and as Fareforde in the Domesday book. The components come from Old English from fæger + ford meaning 'clear ford'.

== History ==
=== Iron Age ===
There was a major roundhouse settlement in Horcott (on the south side of the town), and the Welsh Way, which passed through Fairford, was used during this period as a trade route.

=== Middle Ages ===
Evidence of settlement in Fairford dates back to the 9th century, and it received a royal market grant in the 12th century. An estate in Fairford, which seemingly belonged to Gloucester Abbey, was bequeathed to Burgred of Mercia in the mid 9th century. At the time of the Norman Conquest in 1066, Brictric, a large landowner in the West Country, held a manor in Fairford. Matilda of Flanders came to own the land, which became the property of the Crown. In 1100, Robert Fitzhamon, the first Norman feudal baron of Gloucester, is recorded as owning the land, which would be passed down to subsequent barons of Gloucester for the next 200 years, along with the manor of Tewkesbury.

In 1066 there were three mills in the town, one of which was still used in the wool trade in the 13th century. The mill that survives today was built in the 17th century.

Edward I and Henry VIII visited the town in 1276 and 1520 respectively.

Fairford is recorded as having a prison in 1248. Hundred courts were held by the lord of the manor and borough.

By the 15th century the land of Fairford was managed by wool merchants John Twynyho and John Tame, after George Plantagenet, Duke of Clarence was forced to give up his lands after being tried for treason.

=== 17th and 18th centuries ===
In 1608, the inhabitants of Fairford were mostly agricultural labourers or artisans.

Fairford Park, to the north of the town, was built by Andrew Barker in the 1660s and became part of the manor house grounds. It was later turned into a deer park by James Lambe, with an obelisk built to mark the edge of the grounds. The park remained in the Barker family until it was sold to Ernest Cook in 1945.

The first record of an inn appears in 1419, and more inns appeared over the centuries owing to Fairford's location on routes between larger towns; in 1755, seven innkeepers were licensed in Fairford. Stagecoaches often called at Fairford on their way to Gloucester, Cirencester, Bristol, Oxford or London.

=== 19th and 20th centuries ===
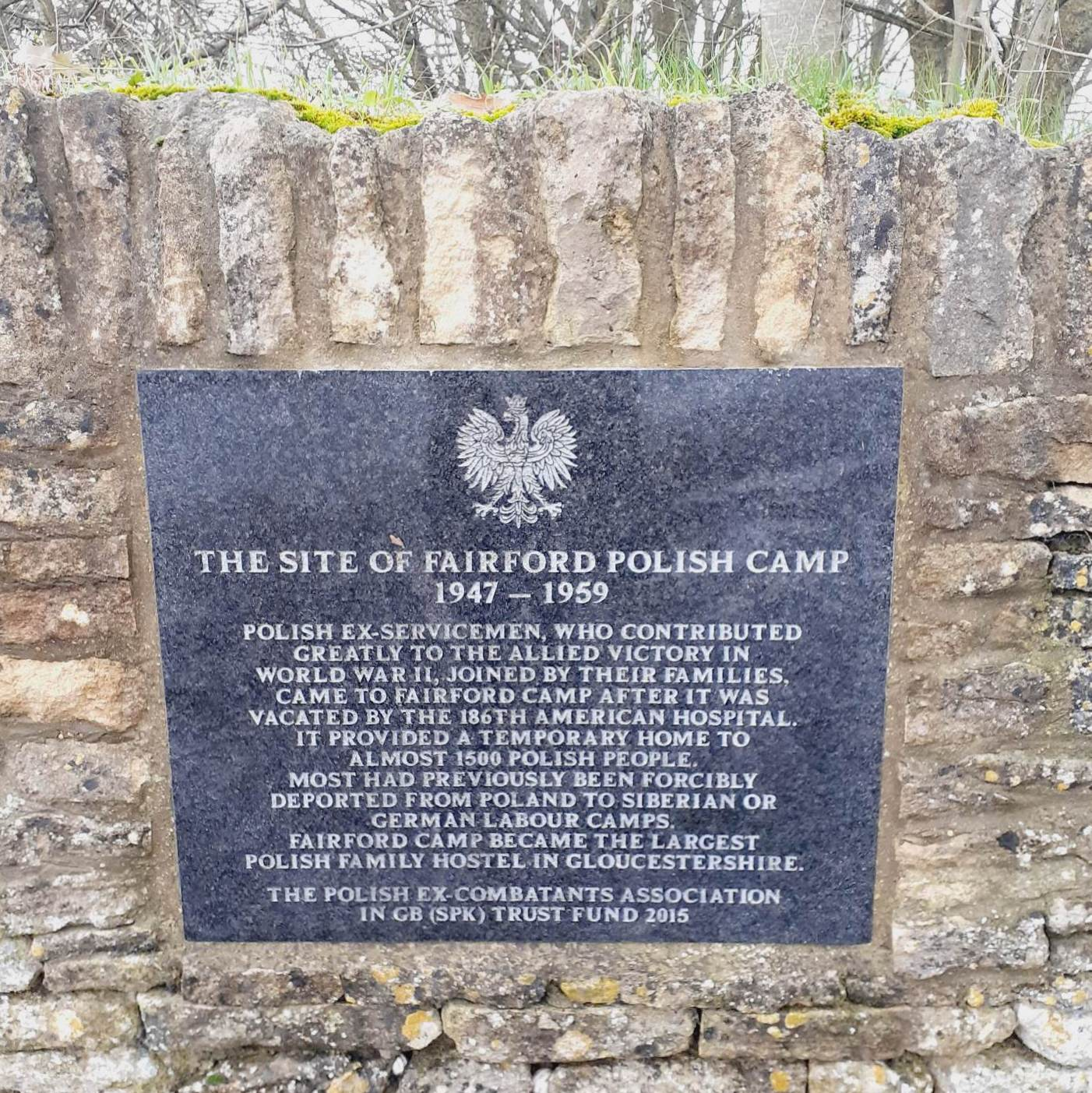
Plaque commemorating the Polish camp on Leafield Road

The first outbreak of the 1830–31 Swing Riots in Gloucestershire was in Fairford on 26 November 1830. Farming machinery which was being manufactured in the town was destroyed by protestors, who then joined forces with those from the surrounding villages of Quenington, Hatherop, Coln and Southrop.

By this time there were pounds, in the town as well as a village lock-up that had been around since at least 1809.

RAF Fairford was constructed in 1944 as a joint British and American base.

From 1947 to 1959, Fairford housed 1,200 Poles in The Displaced Persons Camp who had been displaced due to the Second World War. The site had originally been an American Air Force hospital that had been built during the war. The buildings were then repurposed for the camp, before being demolished in 1977.

=== 21st century ===
==== Iraq War ====
In March 2003 'Flowers to Fairford' was held as a protest against the use of RAF Fairford as the base for the 14 B-52 bombers aircraft which were used to bomb Iraq as part of Operation Iraqi Freedom. Several thousand people attended and there was a large police presence, but the event passed off peacefully. A coach load of people intending to protest was stopped in Lechlade under Section 44 of the Terrorism Act 2000 and searched by police and sent back to London. Ninety of the detained demonstrators formed Fairford Coach Action and sought legal recourse against Gloucestershire constabulary. The group stated that:

"On 22 March 2003, the police used surprisingly extreme tactics to prevent more than 120 activists from reaching [the] legally sanctioned anti-war demonstration in Fairford, (Gloucestershire, UK). The demonstration outside a US Airforce Base in Fairford was well attended with estimates of up to 5,000 activists attending. Among the scheduled speakers on the day were writer George Monbiot and Caroline Lucas (MEP). The people who police prevented from attending were a diverse group with a broad range of affiliations. The main thing that they had in common was the desire to travel from London by coach and the intention of joining the legal protest in Fairford. Two of the four main scheduled speakers for the Fairford demonstration were travelling on these coaches from London. After the coaches had travelled two and a half hours from London, the coaches were stopped by police just miles from the demonstration. Using section 60 powers (of the Public Order and Criminal Justice Act 1994) police searched the coaches for weapons for one and a half hours. The passengers cooperated with this search, and they were invited to reboard the coaches when the search concluded. No arrests were made and no items found. After all the passengers boarded, the coaches were escorted immediately back to London under a continuous 9–12 vehicle police escort."

In 2013, after appeal, Gloucestershire police's actions were found to be unlawful, and included breaching "protesters' rights to freedom of expression and freedom of peaceful assembly." Some of the demonstrators involved were awarded upwards of £4,000 in compensation by a judge after taking their claim to court.

==== Flooding ====
In July 2007 Fairford suffered unseasonably high rainfall which led to major flooding of 64 homes on Milton Street and London Street as well as in some other surrounding areas. This meant that many of the annual events had to be cancelled.

==== Archaeological find ====
In 2013, a female skeleton was found in the River Coln and was later discovered to be of Sub-Saharan origin. The remains were estimated to be around 1000 years old (between 896 and 1025 CE) and it is thought that the woman was around 18-24 when she died. Until this discovery, the earliest known Africans in Britain were from the 12th century.

== Churches ==
=== St Mary's Church ===
The Church of England parish church of Saint Mary is renowned for its complete set of medieval stained glass, stone carvings and misericords. Rebuilt in the early 1490s by the wool merchant John Tame (d.1500), the church is an example of late Perpendicular Gothic architecture that is characterised by slim stone window mullions and light but strong buttresses. The style enabled larger windows than previously, allowing much more light into the building. Grade I listed by English Heritage, its structure and details remains unaltered since built.

The churchyard includes a stone memorial to Tiddles, the church cat who fell off the church roof. There is also a stone grotesque to commemorate a young boy who climbed up the walls of the church and jumped, falling to his death.

==== Stained glass, St Mary's Church ====
St. Mary's is of national historical and architectural importance because it houses the most complete set of mediaeval stained glass windows in the country, attributed to Barnard Flower. The glass survived the Reformation when many images in English churches were destroyed. In 1642, during the Civil War, they narrowly avoided destruction when the Roundhead army was marching on the nearby town of Cirencester.

Some of the panes were damaged during a storm in November 1703 and those were repaired and modified or replaced. A conservation and restoration programme began in 1988 and finished in 2010. Clear glass now protects the old glass.

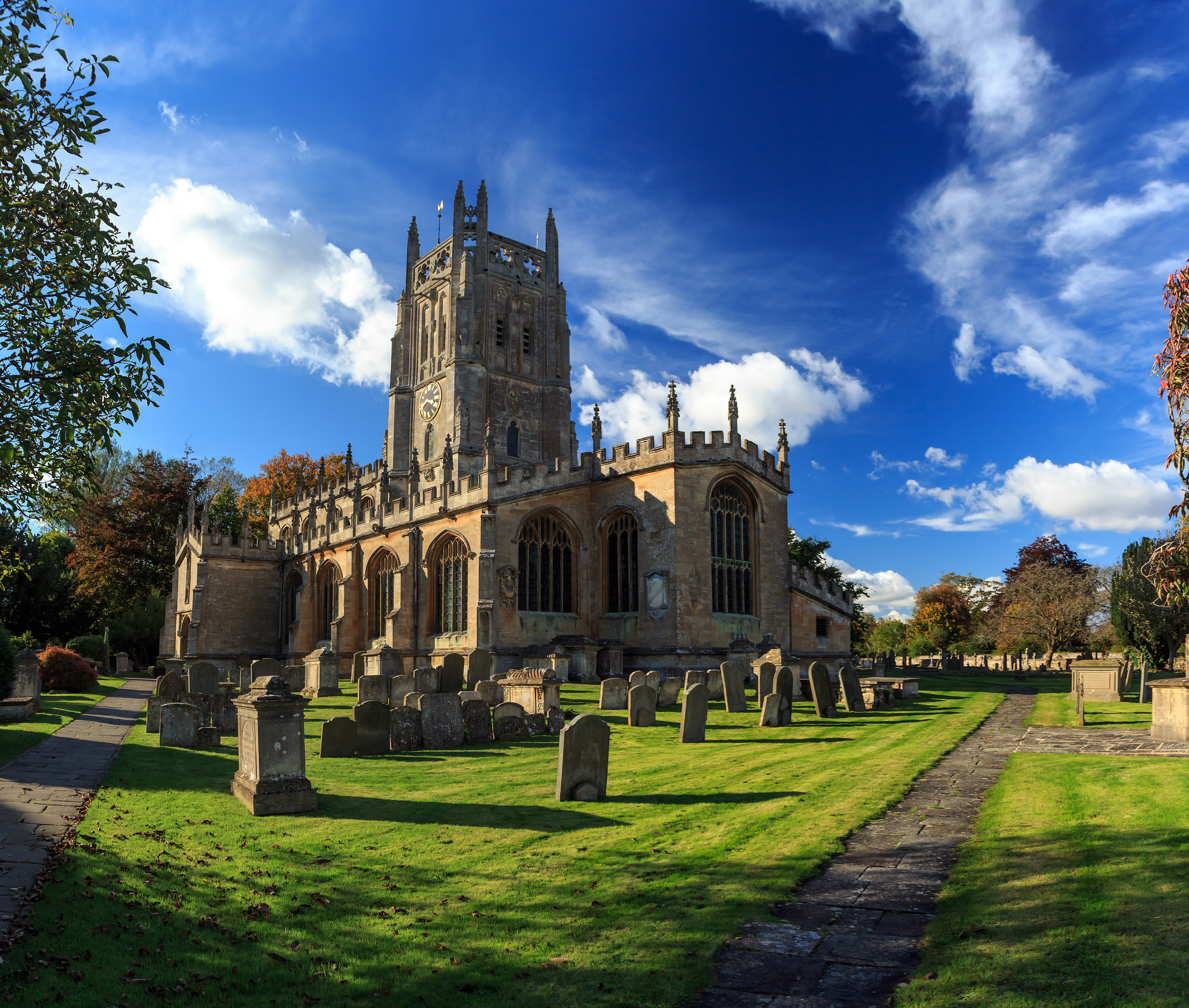
Parish church of St. Mary (consecrated 1497)

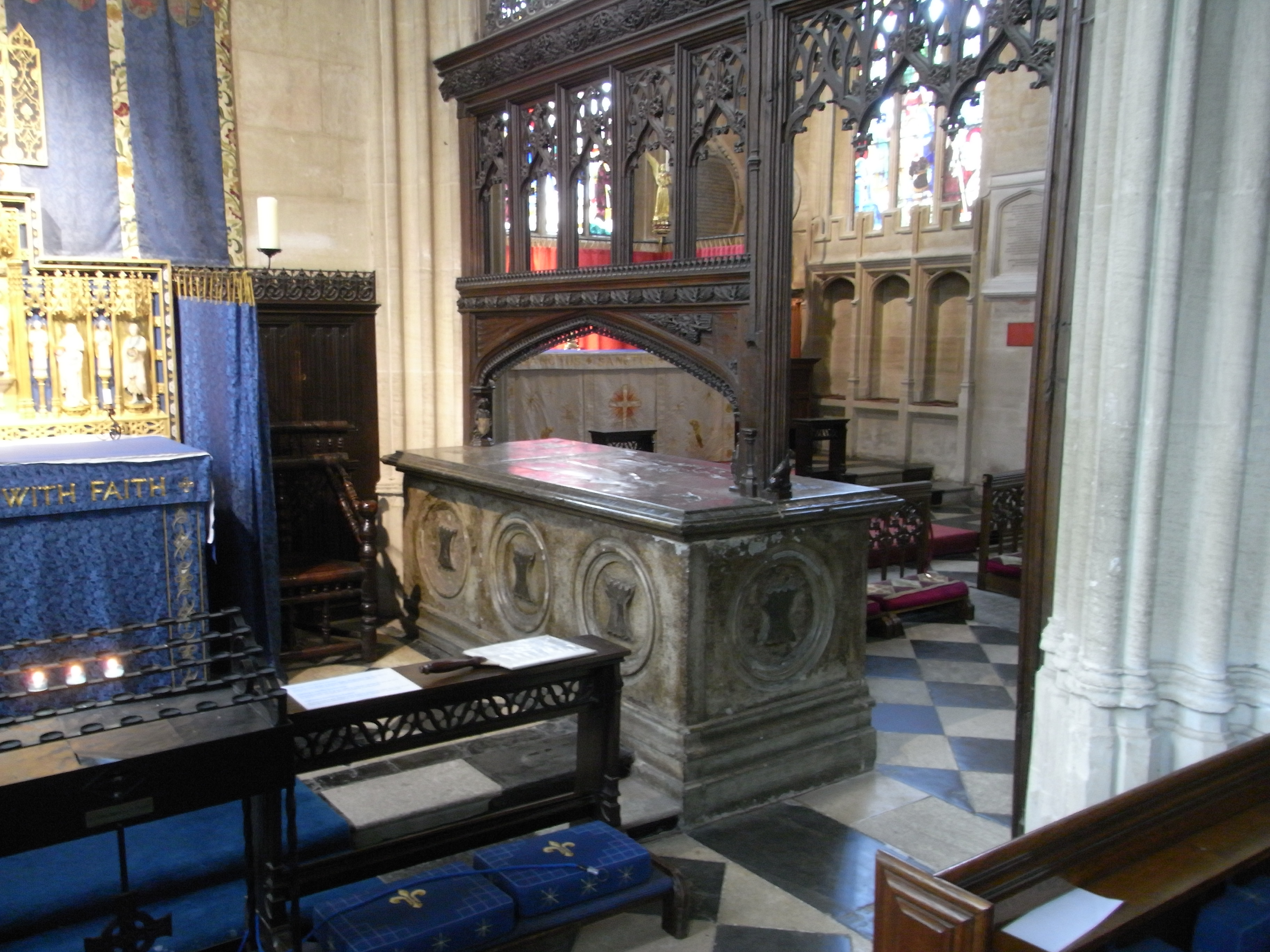
The tomb, in St. Mary's Church, of John Tame and his wife Alice Twynyho.

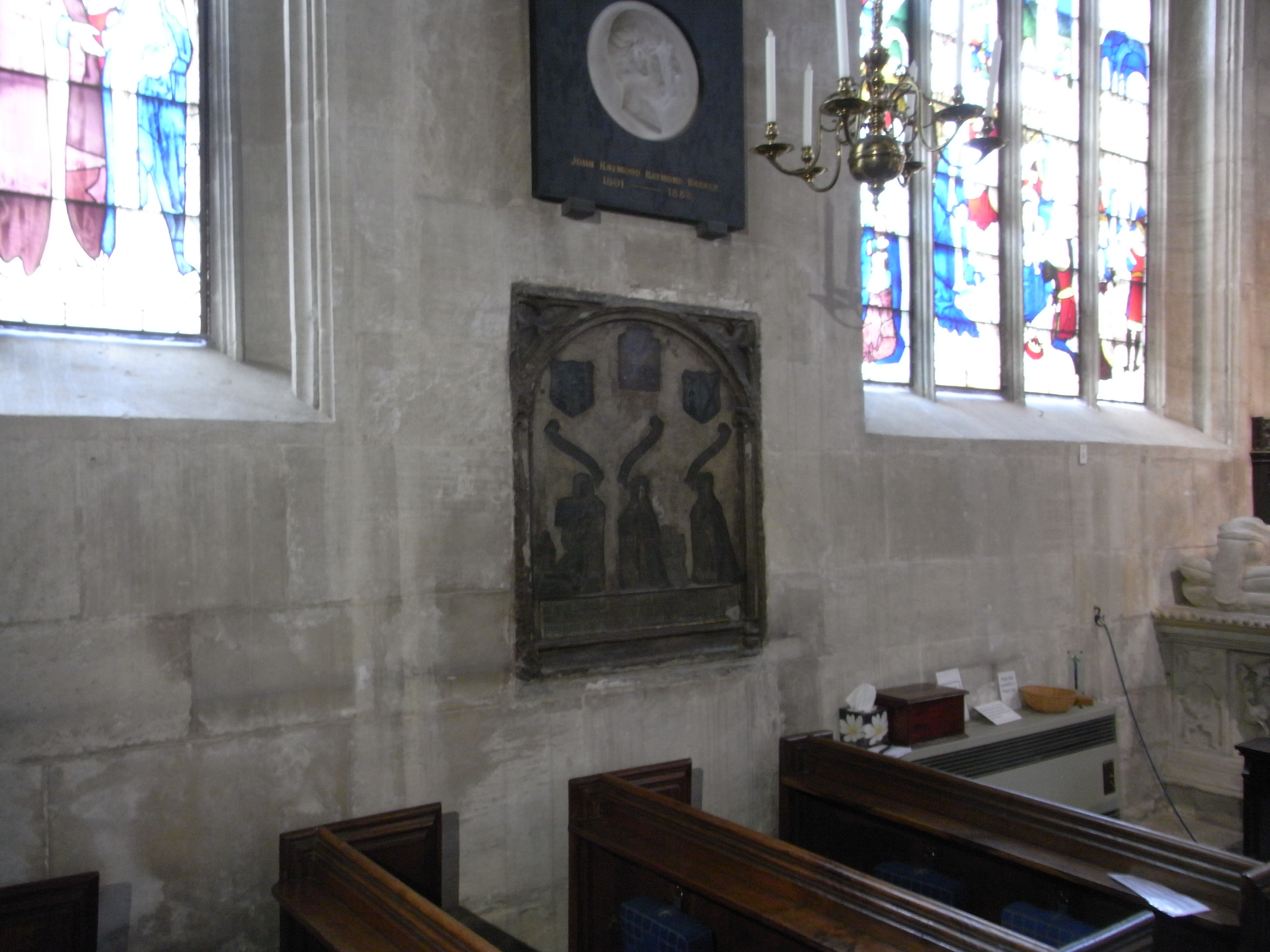
Monumental brass for Edward I Tame in the north wall of the Lady chapel.

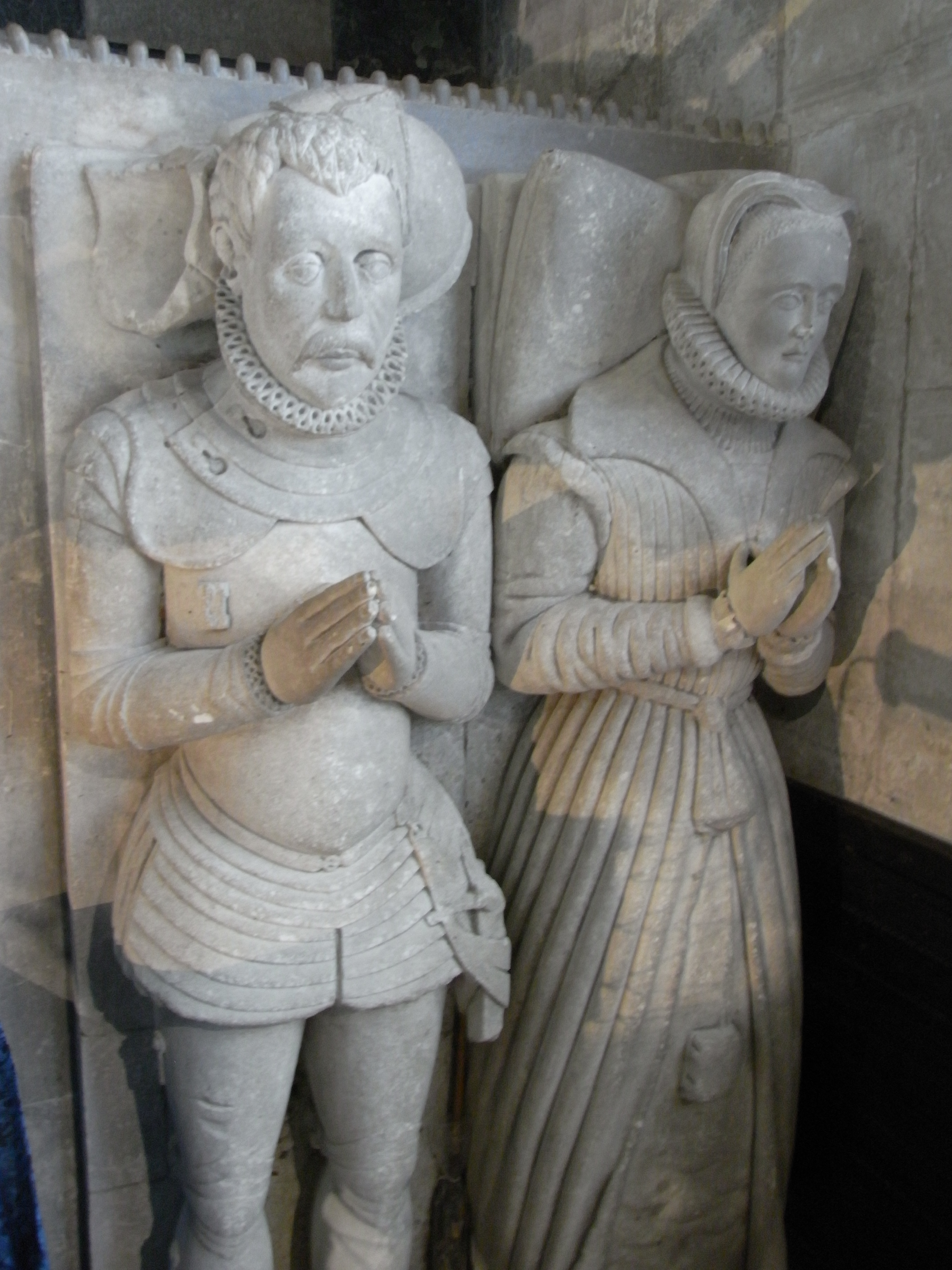
Tomb with effigies of Katherine Denys and her third husband Roger Lygon of Madresfield.

=== St Thomas' of Canterbury ===
Fairford has a 19th-century Catholic church of St Thomas of Canterbury. Following the closure of the recusant chapel at Hatherop Castle in 1844, a church was built at Horcott the following year at a cost of £700. The first Mass was celebrated in 1845, five years before the Restoration of the Hierarchy in England and before the creation of the Roman Catholic Diocese of Clifton. The stained glass window behind the altar depicts St. Thomas of Canterbury in the centre panel, showing the date 1845. The adjoining Presbytery was built 20 years later to designs by Benjamin Bucknall, the architect of Woodchester Mansion. The church contains an organ by Hill and stained glass by William Wailes, Hardman and Geoffrey Robinson. The two windows in the porch were added to commemorate the 150th anniversary of the first Mass. The left window depicts the crest of the de Mauley family; that on the right depicts the Eucharist.

=== Fairford United Church ===
In 1981 a group of local Methodists approached the local Congregational Church to use the chapel for their services as there was no Methodist Church in Fairford. They were officially united into one congregation in 1986 and the present church follows the traditions of both the Methodist Church and the Congregational Federation.

The churches in and around Fairford are represented by the organisation Churches Together Around Fairford (CTAF) which has meetings and organises services of unity.

== Governance ==
Fairford was part of the Cirencester Rural District until the Local Government Act 1972, when it became part of the Cotswold District.

Fairford is in a civil parish and has a Town Council with 13 members. The mayor is James Nicholls.

After a boundary review implemented for the 2015 local elections, Fairford was split into two District Council electoral wards called Fairford North Ward (single member) and Lechlade, Kempsford and Fairford South Ward (two member). On Cotswold District Council Fairford North Ward is represented by Liberal Democrat Andrew Doherty and Lechlade, Kempsford and Fairford South Ward is as of May 2023 represented by Liberal Democrats Councillors Clare Muir and Helene Mansilla.

As of 2021, the town is represented on Gloucestershire County Council by Conservative Councillor Dom Morris who represents the Fairford and Lechlade on Thames Division.

The ward population at the 2011 census was 4,031.

=== 2023 Cotswold District Council election results ===
Fairford North Ward
Party	Candidate	Votes	%	±%
Liberal Democrats	Michael Vann	406	51.5	−17.7
Conservative	Tom Dutton	316	40.1	+9.8
Heritage	James Nicholls	67	8.5	N/A
Majority		90	11.4	
Turnout		789		
Liberal Democrats hold		Swing		

Lechlade, Kempsford and Fairford South Ward (2 seats)
Party	Candidate	Votes	%	±%
Liberal Democrats	Clare Muir	1,150	56.5	+26.2
Liberal Democrats	Helene Mansilla	976	48.0	N/A
Conservative	Stephen Andrews*	785	38.6	−13.4
Conservative	Steve Trotter*	776	38.2	−13.6
Labour	Esme Barlow Hall	131	6.4	N/A
Labour	Trevor Smith	114	5.6	−9.1
Majority		191		
Turnout		2034	9.4	
Liberal Democrats gain from Conservative				
Liberal Democrats gain from Conservative				

=== 2017 Cotswold District Council by-election result ===
Fairford North Ward

Fairford North Ward by-election
Party	Candidate	Votes	%	±%
Liberal Democrats	Andrew Doherty	610	68.1	+40.2
Conservative	Dominic Morris	270	30.1	−20.9
Green	Xanthe Messenger	15	1.8	+1.8
Majority		270	38.0	
Turnout		897	46.57	
Liberal Democrats gain from Conservative		Swing	30.6%	

=== 2021 Gloucestershire County Council election results ===
Fairford and Lechlade on Thames
Party	Candidate	Votes	%	±%
Conservative	Dom Morris	2,326	59	+4
Liberal Democrats	Tony Dale	1,344	34	+2
Labour	Sharon Aldrick	261	7	+1
Majority		982	25	+2
Turnout		3,931	45.20	+5.40
Conservative hold		Swing		

== Culture ==
=== Air Tattoo ===
For three days every year RAF Fairford hosts one of the world's largest military air shows – the Royal International Air Tattoo. The event usually takes place in July and brings a boost to the economy of the town and surrounding areas. The 2003 show was recognised as the largest military airshow ever, with an attendance of 535 aircraft.

=== Ploughing Championship ===
The Fairford, Faringdon, Filkins and Burford Championship and Country Show held every year since 1948.

=== Steam Rally ===
The Ernest Cook Trust used to host the annual Fairford Steam Rally and Show. The Show closed in 2015 after running for 46 years.

== Education ==
The town has a primary and secondary school, Fairford Primary and Farmor's School, respectively. Farmor's School is an 11-18 co-educational academy.

Coln House School was a 9-16, residential/day state special school. After being put into special measures following a 2016 Ofsted report, the school closed in March 2017. The building was originally built in 1822 by Alexander Iles as a private asylum called 'The Retreat', which closed in 1944 before becoming a school in 1949.

== Local media ==
Local news and television programmes is provided by BBC South and ITV Meridian. Television signals are received from the Oxford TV transmitter.

The town is served by both BBC Radio Wiltshire and BBC Radio Gloucestershire. Other radio stations including Heart West, Greatest Hits Radio South West, Cotswolds Radio, community based radio station and Air Tattoo Live, a RSL station which broadcast coverage during the Royal International Air Tattoo.

Fairford is served by the weekly local newspaper, Wilts and Gloucestershire Standard.

== Sport and leisure ==
Fairford has a non-league football team Fairford Town F.C. who play and train at Cinder Lane. Fairford have their own rugby team FRFC, playing in green and black strip. Fairford also has a women's netball team, competing in the nearby Swindon league. The town also has the Walnut Tree Field: a large playing field and park, a cricket club (dating back to the early 1900s), a bowling, sailing and water skiing club. Fairford had a leisure centre until 2019 which had been managed by Farmor's School since 2013.

Fairford also has a youth football club, based at Horcott Road which caters for children between the ages of 5 and 15 years old. The club, established in 1976, is a FA Chartered Club, run by volunteers for the benefit of local children from Fairford and surrounding villages. Teams from U8 and above play in the North Wiltshire Youth Football Leagues.

== Transport ==
Fairford was formerly linked to Oxford by the Witney Railway and its extension the East Gloucestershire Railway. The route was active between 1873 and 1962. There have been reports that part of the old track could be cleared of accumulated mountains of detritus and overgrown trees to be re-opened as a cycle path.

There is a bus service to Cirencester and Lechlade, from where travellers can transfer to another bus and travel onwards to Swindon.

== In popular culture ==
The Secret Diary of Sarah Thomas, 1860 – 1865, is a published journal by Victorian diarist, Sarah Thomas who lived in Fairford. It features local landmarks.

Fairford has been used as a filming location in Greenfingers (2000), The Power and an episode in series two of This Country.

In the first series of the reality TV series The Restaurant, one pair of contestants opened their restaurant in Fairford.

== Notable residents ==
- Edwin Austin Abbey - (1852-1911) American-born painter
- Walter Buckler - (?–1554) Courtier and diplomat
- Alexander Cohoon - (2002–) Competitive swimmer
- Kenton Cool - (1973–) Mountaineer
- Paul Cornell - (1967–) Writer
- Alfred Cowley - (1848–1926) Politician in Australia
- Frank Cadogan Cowper - (1877–1958) Artist
- Sharron Davies - (1962– ) Competitive swimmer and sports presenter
- Mary Bathurst Deane - (1843–1940) Novelist
- Barbara Dockar Drysdale - (1912–1999) Psychotherapist
- Wills Hill, 1st Marquess of Downshire - (1718–1793) Politician
- Sir Arthur Hirtzel - (1870–1937) Civil servant
- Ellen Joyce - (1832–1924) Imperialist and founder of Winchester Women’s Emigration Society
- John Keble - (1792–1866) Anglican priest and poet
- Joseph Kinghorn - (1766–1832) Baptist minister
- Noël Leslie, Countess of Rothes - (1878–1956) Socialite, who survived the Titanic disaster
- Gerald Loxley - (1885–1950) Aviator and diplomat
- Mike Winters (1926–2013) Comedian
