= Barnard Flower =

Barnard Flower (died July or August 1517) was a Flemish glazier. He was King's Glazier to Henry VII and Henry VIII from 1505 to 1517, the first non-Englishman to hold this office.

Flower came to work in England in the late 15th century. By 1496 he was working for Henry VIII providing glass for Woodstock and then Sheen Palace the following year. He was based in Southwark to avoid the restrictions imposed by the Glaziers' Company in the City of London.

Stained glass attributed to Flower include parts of the West Window of St George's Chapel, Windsor, windows in King's College Chapel, Cambridge, and most of the glazing at St Mary's Church, Fairford, which has the most complete set of mediaeval stained glass windows in England.

Flower's successor as the King's Glazier was Galyon Hone who had trained in Antwerp.
