= Ralph Bigland =

British officer of arms

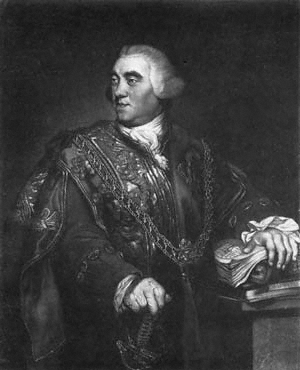
Somerset Herald Ralph Bigland in 1771

Ralph Bigland (29 January 1712 – 27 March 1784) was an English officer of arms, antiquarian and cheesemaker. He was born at Stepney, Middlesex, and was the only son of Richard Bigland and his wife, Mary. His father was a native of Westmorland, descended from the Bigland family of Biglands. He should not be confused with his nephew Sir Ralph Bigland, who also served as an officer of arms.

== Early career ==
In 1728 Bigland was apprenticed within the Tallow Chandlers' Company to a cheesemaker. He was made free of the company in 1737 and served as its master in 1772. He was based in London but his occupation took him to the Low Countries and Leith in Scotland. The War of the Austrian Succession brought him to Flanders, where he supplied cheese to the allied armies. While he was working at this profession, his antiquarian interests were already evident.

== Antiquarian and heraldic interests ==
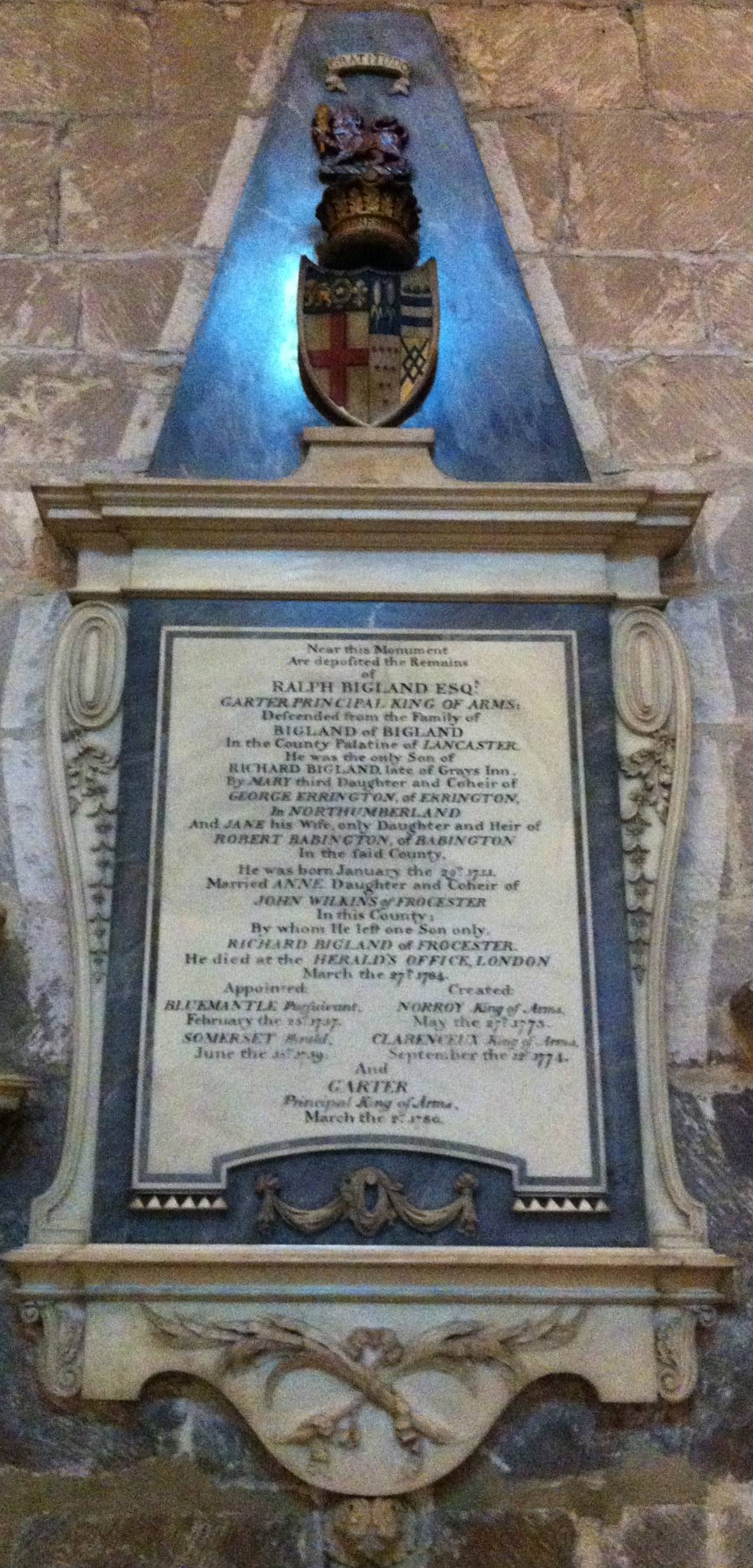
Mural monument to Ralph Bigland in Gloucester Cathedral

Much of Bigland's antiquarian work was focused on Gloucestershire. Over time, he travelled the whole county, accumulating historical information and making it his business to record the inscriptions on everything from great monuments to modest gravestones. Following his death, his son, Richard, attempted to bring the work to print as a county history, under the editorship of James Dallaway. A number of instalments of the Historical, Monumental, and Genealogical Collections relative to the County of Gloucester were published between 1786 and 1792 (completing two volumes, dated 1791 and 1792), and further instalments appeared sporadically through the 19th century. However, the project remained unfinished until a definitive edition was published in four volumes by the Bristol and Gloucestershire Archaeological Society between 1989 and 1995.

Bigland's antiquarian concerns brought about a change of career in 1757. In that year, he was appointed Bluemantle Pursuivant of Arms in Ordinary at the College of Arms. He was promoted to the office of Somerset Herald of Arms in Ordinary in 1759. He was a skilled draftsman, and he was a methodical genealogist. He advocated the inclusion of much greater detail in church registers and called for better safekeeping and detailed indexing of such records. Along with his friend and colleague Sir Isaac Heard, he helped to reestablish the College of Arms as the center of genealogical study in England. Bigland climbed steadily in the heraldic hierarchy and was a king of arms for the last eleven years of his life. He became Norroy King of Arms in 1773, Clarenceux King of Arms in 1774, and Garter Principal King of Arms in 1780.

Bigland was working until his demise when he died in his rooms in the College of Arms on 27 March 1784. He was buried on 8 April in Gloucester Cathedral. Practising what he preached, he had himself drafted the inscription, which contains a quantity of genealogical information.

== Arms ==
Coat of arms of Ralph Bigland
Adopted Exemplified 1760 Crest On a torse or & azure a lion passant looking backwards gules & holding in the dexter paw an ear of big or. Escutcheon Quarterly with a crescent for difference; (1) azure, 2 ears of big (wheat) or (Bigland); (2) argent, 2 bars with 3 scallops in chief gules (Errington); (3) argent, 10 roundels gules (Babington); (4) or, a fret sable (Ward). Motto Gratitudo ("Grateful") (displayed over the crest)

== See also ==
- Heraldry
