= David Singh =

David Singh may refer to:

- David Singh (character), a fictional character in DC Comics
- David Arthur Singh (1929–1978), Guyanese diplomat and politician
- David Joseph Singh (born 1958), American theoretical physicist
