= List of ambassadors of Guyana to China =

Coordinates: 39.915986°N 116.448815°E

Ambassador of Guyana to the People's Republic of China
- Inaugural holder: David Arthur Singh
- Formation: October 23, 1973

The Guyanese ambassador in Beijing is the official representative of the Government in Georgetown, Guyana to the Government of the People's Republic of China and is regularly accredited as ambassador to Pyongyang.

== List of representatives ==
Diplomatic agrément/Diplomatic accreditation	ambassador	Observations	List of heads of state of Guyana	Premier of the People's Republic of China	Term end
June 27, 1972		Establishing diplomatic relations	Arthur Chung	Zhou Enlai	
October 23, 1973	David Arthur Singh		Arthur Chung	Zhou Enlai	
1976	John Carter (ambassador)		Arthur Chung	Hua Guofeng	1979
October 1981	Ashik Altaf Mohammed	In 1970 he was employed in the High Commission in London.	Forbes Burnham	Zhao Ziyang	1988
March 30, 1990	Peter Winston Denny	From 1982 to 1989 he was ambassador in Moscow, he was President of Guyana Amateur Radio Association	Hugh Desmond Hoyte	Li Peng	1991
1995	Ronald Mortimer Austin	1976 2nd secretary London	Cheddi Jagan	Li Peng	2004
2006	Cecil Pollydore	Chargé d'affaires	Bharrat Jagdeo	Wen Jiabao	2007
December 1, 2010	David Dabydeen		Bharrat Jagdeo	Wen Jiabao	2015
