= Luckhoo =

Luckhoo is a Guyanese surname. Notable people with the surname include:

- Edward Luckhoo (1912–1998), Guyanese politician
- Lionel Luckhoo (1914–1997), Guyanese politician, diplomat, and lawyer
