= 1957 British Guiana general election =

- 12 August 1957

14 seats in the Legislative Council 8 seats needed for a majority
- Registered: 212,518
- Turnout: 55.79%
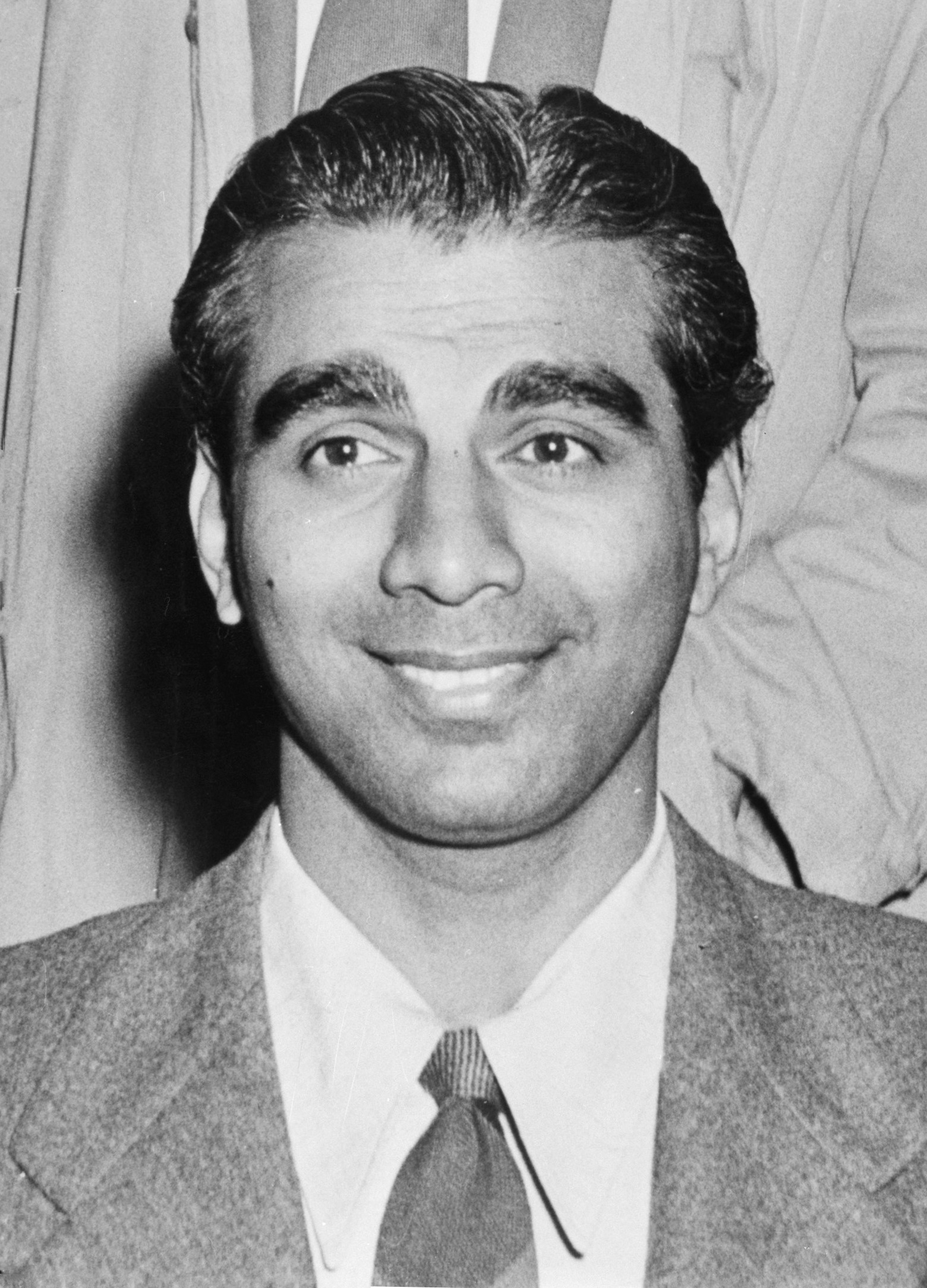

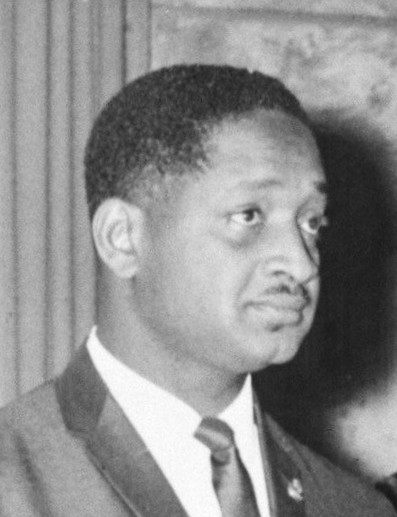

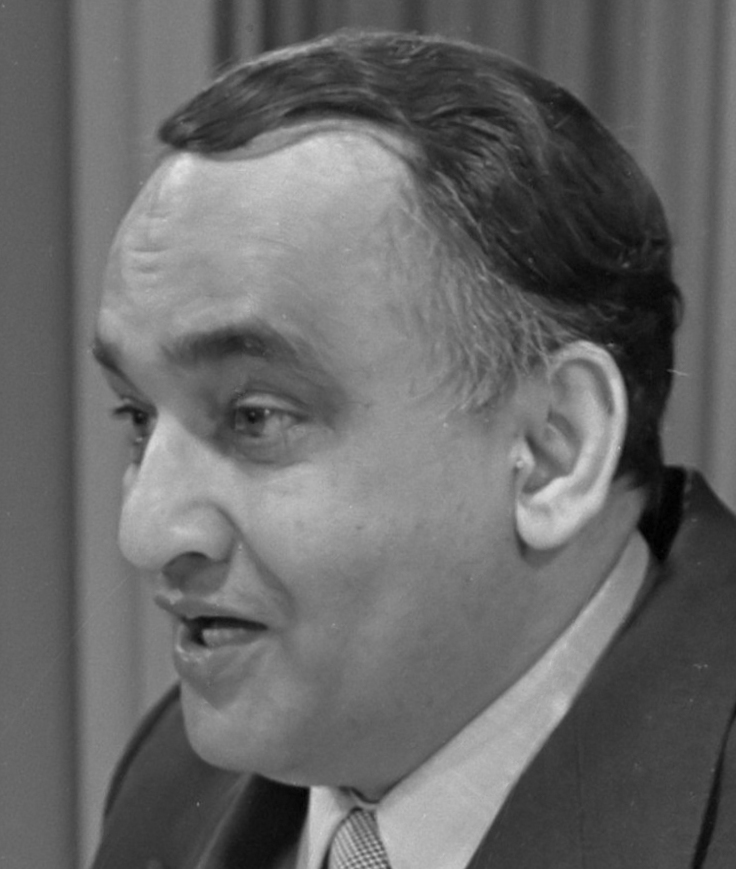
	First party	Second party
Leader	Cheddi Jagan	Forbes Burnham
Party	PPP-Jaganite	PPP-Burnhamite
Seats won	9	3
Popular vote	55,552	29,802
Percentage	47.51%	25.49%
	Third party	Fourth party
Leader	Lionel Luckhoo	John Carter
Party	NLF	UDP
Seats won	1	1
Popular vote	13,465	9,564
Percentage	11.51%	8.18%
Premier before election
None
Elected Premier
Cheddi Jagan
PPP

General elections were held in British Guiana on 12 August 1957. The result was a victory for the faction of the People's Progressive Party led by Cheddi Jagan, who remained Prime Minister.

== Campaign ==
A total of 55 candidates contested the elections, including six independents. The National Labour Front was the only party to run a candidate in every Legislative Council seat, with the two factions of the PPP both contesting 13 seats. The United Democratic Party (UDP) contested eight seats and the Guiana National Party one.

== Results ==
Party	Votes	%	Seats	+/–
People's Progressive Party (Jaganite)	55,552	47.51	9	–
People's Progressive Party (Burnhamite)	29,802	25.49	3	–
National Labour Front	13,465	11.51	1	New
United Democratic Party	9,564	8.18	1	New
Guiana National Party	199	0.17	0	New
Independents	8,357	7.15	0	–4
Total	116,939	100.00	14	–10
Valid votes	116,939	98.63		
Invalid/blank votes	1,625	1.37		
Total votes	118,564	100.00		
Registered voters/turnout	212,518	55.79		
Source: GECOM

=== Elected members ===
Constituency	Member	Party
Berbice River	Ajodha Singh	People's Progressive Party (Jagan)
Central Demerara	Balram Singh Rai	People's Progressive Party (Jagan)
Demerara-Essequibo	Ram Karran	People's Progressive Party (Jagan)
Demerara River	Fred Bowman	People's Progressive Party (Jagan)
Eastern Berbice	Cheddi Jagan	People's Progressive Party (Jagan)
Eastern Demerara	Edward Balkaran Beharry	People's Progressive Party (Jagan)
Essequibo River	Brindley Benn	People's Progressive Party (Jagan)
Georgetown Central	Forbes Burnham	People's Progressive Party (Burnham)
Georgetown North	Andrew Leonard Jackson	People's Progressive Party (Burnham)
Georgetown South	Jainarine Singh	People's Progressive Party (Burnham)
New Amsterdam	Rudy Kendall	United Democratic Party
North Western District	Stephen Campbell	National Labour Front
Western Berbice	Sheik Mohamed Saffee	People's Progressive Party (Jagan)
Western Essequibo	Janet Jagan	People's Progressive Party (Jagan)
Source: Parliament of Guyana

== Aftermath ==
After the elections, the Burnhamite faction of the PPP merged with the UDP to form the People's National Congress.
