= "Yo mama" joke =

Insulting reference to someone's mother

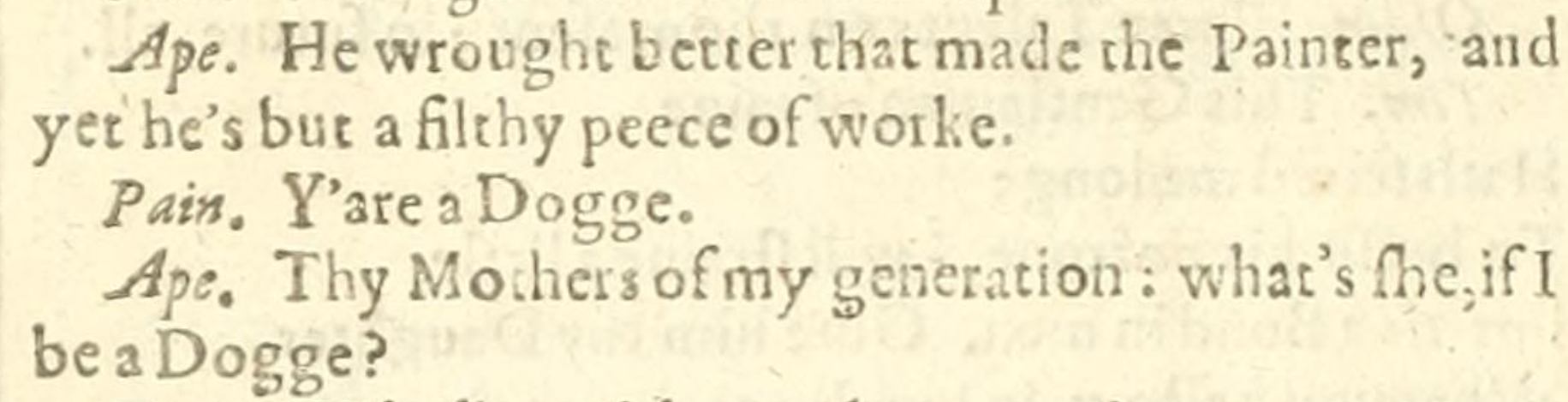
A "yo mama" joke in William Shakespeare's Timon of Athens, detail from the First Folio.

A "yo mama" joke, "your mom" joke, or maternal insult is a form of humor involving a verbal disparaging of one's mother. Used as an insult, "your mother..." preys on widespread sentiments of parental respect. Suggestions of promiscuity and obesity are common. Compared to other types of insults, "your mother" insults are especially likely to incite violence. Slang variants such as "ur mum" are sometimes used, depending on speaker. Insults involving "your mother" are commonly used when playing the Dozens. In non–American areas, the association can be with juvenile culture generally.

Although the phrase has a long history of including a description portion, such as the old "your mother wears combat boots", the phrase "yo mama" by itself, without any qualifiers, has become commonly used as an all–purpose insult or an expression of defiance.

== Construction ==
Your mom jokes usually consist of a sentence that starts with "Your mother..." This is followed by either a derogatory statement about the mother's behavior, appearance, social status, or intelligence ("...is so fat..."), illustrated with an example ("... she looks at the menu and then says to the waiter: Okay."), which at the same time pushes the content of the statement into implausibility, providing the punch line of the joke. However, these absurd statements can also follow directly after the beginning of the joke, whereby the explicit insult of the mother as fat, ugly, poor or stupid is omitted and only implicitly resonates. For example, the sentence "Your mother's name is Ottfried and she is the bull of Tölz" contains an allusion to both the alleged fullness and lack of femininity of the other's mother. More unusual variants consist of several sentences which initially tell a more complex story but later boil down to the same punchline.

Your mother jokes can also be designed as an interplay of insults that tie in with each other in dialogue and outdo each other, for example in this form:

"Fuck yourself."
"I'm tired from fuckin' your wife."
"How's your mother?"
"Good, she's tired from fuckin' my father."

== Ancient times ==
The incarnations of filial piety in various cultures are reflected by examples through history.

Rabbi Eliezer (c. 100 CE) was said to have interrupted a man reading aloud the opening words of the then-banned and still-troubling Ezekiel 23.

Man: "Mortal, proclaim to Jerusalem her abominations..."
Eliezer: "Why don't you go out and proclaim the abominations of your mother?"

Plutarch's biography of Cicero notes that:

Again, in a dispute with Cicero, Metellus Nepos asked repeatedly "Who is your father?"

"In your case," said Cicero, "your mother has made the answer to this question rather difficult."

In the Strategies of the Warring States, it is recorded that the following was said by the King Wei of Qi after hearing of his envoy being insulted by the King of Zhou:

昔齊威王嘗為仁義矣， 率天下諸侯而朝周。周貧且微，諸侯莫朝，而齊獨朝之。居歲餘，周烈王崩， 諸侯皆弔，齊後往。周怒，赴於齊曰：「天崩地坼，天子下席。 東藩之臣田嬰齊後至，則斮之。」 威王勃然怒曰：「叱嗟，而母婢也。」
It is said that King Wei of Qi was a righteous fellow. Despite being one of the strongest dukes, he obeyed the Zhou king. The Zhou king at the time was poor and weak, and many of his vassals sought refuge in other leaders, with the State of Qi being the only exception. King Lie of Zhou died one year, and all the states offered condolences. The ambassador of Qi arrived late. The Zhou were maddened by this, and sent a message to Qi. "Poor form! How dare an Eastern petty kingdom like you arrive late to the funeral? We have executed the envoy for the indecency." The irate king spoke thus without hesitation, "Alas! For your mother was a slave-girl."

— Strategies of the Warring States: Strategies of Zhao

== Function ==
John Dollard said the dozens was a way to express or mitigate anger in underprivileged African-American groups. There are issues of gender, as he imagined this a matter of young men within a matriarchal structure.

== Modern use ==
Movies have seen the incorporation of "Yo Mama" jokes, utilized as punchlines or comedic dialogues between characters. For instance, in the movie White Men Can't Jump (1992), characters exchange "Yo Mama" jokes. Other movies like The Nutty Professor (1996) have featured "Yo Mama" jokes as part of the comedic interaction between characters.

In October 2025, then-White House press secretary Karoline Leavitt facetiously used "Your mom did" as a response to a reporter's serious question.

In October 2025, then-Representative Sheila Cherfilus-McCormick (D-FL) and her primary opponent, Elijah Manley, engaged in a tense confrontation during a town hall meeting, which concluded with Cherfilus-McCormick repeatedly saying "your mama" to Manley.

== See also ==
- Battle rap
- Dad joke
- Fighting words
- Flyting – related historical practices
- Grass Mud Horse
- Motherfucker
- Dozens (game)
