= Richard Mico =

English composer (c1590-1661)

Richard Mico (also Micoe, Micho, Meco, Myco; 1590–1661) was an English composer. He was born in Taunton, Somerset, the eldest of three sons of Walter Mico. The family, originally called "Micault", had immigrated to England from France several generations earlier. The Micos were a merchant family: the composer's cousin was Sir Samuel Mico (1608–66), who settled in London by the 1630s, made his fortune in overseas trade to become an alderman of London and Master of the Mercers’ Company, and was knighted after the Restoration.

Mico was appointed resident musician at Thorndon Hall, Essex, in 1608. There, he worked for Sir William Petre (William Byrd's former patron) as a music teacher for the family's children, as well as composing for the household. Surviving documents record the handing over of the household instruments to Mico in 1608, including five viols (with bows), a lute, organ and virginals. While working for Petre, Mico adopted his employer's faith, converting to Roman Catholicism.

In 1630 he was appointed as organist to Queen Henrietta Maria, wife of Charles I, and held this post until the queen's flight to Holland in 1642.

He was buried at St Paul's, Covent Garden, on 10 April 1661.

None of Mico's consort works were published during his lifetime, but Christopher Simpson, writing six years after his death, named him as one of the best composers of fantasias.

== Works ==
- Manuscript Mus. 517-20 in the library of Christ Church, Oxford is a set of four partbooks containing instrumental works by Richard Mico (as well as those by Alfonso Ferrabosco, John Ward and John Jenkins). The copyist is unidentified, English, 1630-50. This collection includes 17 of Mico's fantasias for four viols.
- Music MS 1197 in the library of the Royal College of Music, London is an autograph set of partbooks devoted exclusively to Mico's four-part works.
- Fretwork has published the score and parts of the complete four-part fantasias and pavans of Richard Mico in Richard Mico: The Four-Part Consort Music edited by Meredith Tyler (London: Fretwork Editions, 1st ed. 1992, 2nd ed. 1997). The Fretwork Edition was used for the Phantasm recording Still Music of the Spheres, 1996.
- All of Mico's known surviving works have been published in the Musica Britannica series: Musica Britannica, Volume 65; Richard Mico: Consort Music, 1994, edited by Andrew Hanley. Published by, Stainer & Bell Ltd, London. ISBN 978-0-85249-822-4.:
  - Four fantasies à2
  - Seven fantasies à3 with organ
  - 17 fantasies à4
  - Four fantasies à5
  - Four pavans à4
  - Three pavans à5
  - An In Nomine à5
  - Latral à5

== Recordings ==
- Phantasm: Still Music of the Spheres; Consorts by William Byrd and Richard Mico, Simax, PSC1143
- Amsterdam Loeki Stardust Quartet: Fantazia, Channel Classics Records CCS 16998 includes Mico's Pavan No.1 in C minor and Pavan No. 4 in C major

== Bibliography ==
- J. Bennett and P. Willetts: ‘Richard Mico’, Chelys, vii (1977), 24–46
- J. Bennett: ‘Byrd and Jacobean Consort Music: a Look at Richard Mico’, Byrd Studies, ed. A. Brown and R. Turbet (Cambridge, 1992), 129–40
- A. Hanley: ‘Mico and Jenkins: “Musitians of Fame under King Charles I”’, John Jenkins and his Time, ed. A. Ashbee (Oxford, 1996), 161–9
- R. Thompson: ‘A Further Look at the Consort Music Manuscripts in Archbishop Marsh's Library, Dublin’, Chelys, xxiv (1995), 3–18
