= Mico Foundation =

The Mico Foundation is a registered company under the Companies’ Act of Jamaica, with registered offices at 1A Marescaux Road. A twelve-member Board of Directors governs The Mico Foundation with the President of the company as Managing Director.

The historical significance of Mico embodies a tradition of resilience, endurance and relevance especially in the 21st century. The sole survivor of over 300 “normal" schools established in the Caribbean during the post-talent era, Mico has given service in education for over 170 years. Mico holds the record of being the oldest teacher training institution in the western Hemisphere. Maintaining this solid foundation is part of the Company's Strategic Plan which envisions the company becoming a University College, offering first degrees in Primary and Secondary Education, Educational Administration, Special Education, Guidance and Counselling, and Science Education.

== History ==
Beginning in 1835, four teacher training institutions and hundreds of elementary schools were established in the British Colonies in the West Indies, Mauritius and Seychelles by the Lady Mico Charity. This followed the successful efforts of Sir Thomas Fowell Buxton and Stephen Lushington to direct the resources of the Charity to the education of the children of the ex-slaves in these British Colonies (in the West Indies, Mauritius and Seychelles) where slavery was in the process of being abolished. In an era where denominational education was the norm, the defining feature of the Mico institutions was that they were of Christian influence but non-denominational.

Except in St Lucia, most Mico elementary schools did not survive the discontinuation of the Negro Education Grant in 1846 which was provided by the British Parliament (which ended in 1846). Those that survived were overtaken by the twin forces of denominational education and the entry of the Government of Colonies into providing elementary education. The elementary schools in St Lucia survived the longest until the 1890s.

The only teacher training institution to survive into the 20th Century and that remains until today is The Mico University College in Kingston, Jamaica. Its founding in 1835 makes it the oldest teacher training college in the Western Hemisphere and one of the oldest in the world rivaling the famed Battersea College in England. The survival of The Mico University College in Kingston is rooted in four characteristics of the institution:

The Mico University College was founded in 1835 as a co-educational institution training British volunteers to teach in Jamaican schools. After the cessation of the Negro Education Grant, when it was determined that it was more economical to train native teachers, The Mico transformed itself into a single-sex male institution training elementary native school teachers. In the 1950s it became co-educational again and remains so. When the Government of Jamaica expanded secondary education in the 1960s, the junior secondary schools were introduced. The Mico included in its portfolio the training of teachers for the junior secondary schools. By the end of the 1970s, The Mico further expanded its training of teachers for secondary schools to cover the entire range of secondary education. By then, it had become the institution, which was training the largest number of secondary school teachers in the country.

In this same period, the Government started training teachers for children with special needs, as well as funding for the training of teachers for these schools. Consequently, The Mico was selected by the Government as the college to offer this training. By the 1980s, The Mico was not only providing such teachers for schools in Jamaica, but for the entire English-speaking Caribbean. In addition, through assistance from the Government of the Netherlands, the College established The Mico University College Diagnostic and Therapeutic Centre (the CARE Centre); to diagnose the learning challenges of multiple handicapped children and design individualised instructional techniques for these students. This Centre is the only one of its kind in the Commonwealth Caribbean and has gained international recognition.

Later in this period, The Mico University College and the University of the West Indies (U.W.I.), pioneered a relationship in the area of special education in which the bachelor's degree in Special Education is jointly taught at the College using the facilities of the CARE Centre. Through this arrangement, The Mico became an affiliate of the University of the West Indies and gained the experience of offering programmes at the degree level.

The record of achievement, in successfully taking on new challenges has earned for the college the reputation of being a leader in educational development in Jamaica and the Caribbean. In seeking to meet the current challenges of Jamaica and the Caribbean, The Mico University College has substantially increased tertiary education enrolment by offering degree programmes to greater number of citizens. It is no surprise therefore, that in 2006, the Ministry of Education upgraded The Mico to a University College and mandated it to make the majority of its programmes degree programmes in teachers' education and related areas.

== Board of the Foundation ==
The Mico Board is drawn, in equal numbers from: 1. Past students of The Mico University College, nominated by the Mico Student Association. 2. Nominees of The Board of Directors of The Mico University College. 3. Trustees of the Lady Mico Charity or representatives of religious denominations recognized by the said charity.

A Finance Committee and a small staff that sees to daily conduct of business, support the Board of the Foundation. Three aspects of the Foundation that needs to be noted are:

1. The Property on which the Mico University College is located, 1A Marescaux Road, is owned and controlled by The Mico Foundation. This property was transferred from the Lady Mico Charity in England to The Mico Foundation in October 2000. Additionally, all other ‘Mico properties’, 60 and 62-64 Arnold Road, 3-9 Manhattan Road as well as two lots on Red Hills are owned and controlled by The Mico Foundation. Maintenance of these properties is the responsibility of the Foundation and the foundation collects rent for the properties it owns.
2. The Mico Foundation operates some commercial enterprises such as Heritage Café and The Mico INAFCA Museum.
3. All educational programmes that are not sponsored by the Ministry of Education are run under the auspices of The Mico Foundation. It follows that all courses offered by The Mico Evening College including the degree programme in Guidance and Counselling, various diploma and certificate courses, Preliminary Teachers’ College programme, fall under The Mico Foundation.

== Annual events ==
1. Research day 2. Gold Medal Award

== Resources ==
=== Heritage Cafe ===
The Mico Foundation operates and owns the heritage cafe located on The Mico University Site, The heritage cafe is responsible reselling day to day snack on campus.

=== Document Center ===
The Foundation also operates and owns the document center also located on The Mico University site, it is known for printing and photocopying however this center is also responsible for reselling books and stationary.

== 175th Celebrations ==
The Mico is an institution of higher education in Kingston, Jamaica. Its mission is "to offer its students opportunities for academic success and professional advancement through a rich and diverse curriculum". The college was founded in 1835 through the Lady Mico Charity, one of four teacher training institutions established during this period in the British colonies and the only one to survive until the present. Mico College is thus the oldest teacher training institution in the Western Hemisphere. Mico College was established as a non-denominational Christian institution that caters both to male and female students. Over the years the institution has undergone expansion and development both physically and in its academic programmes. The Mico celebrated its 175th anniversary in the year 2011.
