= National Labour Front =

Political party in Guyana

The National Labour Front (NLF) was a political party in Guyana.

== History ==
The NLF was established by Lionel Luckhoo in 1956 after a split in the United Democratic Party. Luckhoo was persuaded to establish the party by wealthy anti-communist Indo-Guyanese, and it ran on an anti-independence platform, opposing the People's Progressive Party.

In the 1957 general elections it was the only party to nominate a candidate in all 14 Legislative Council seats, and had a large campaign budget. The party received 12% of the vote, winning only a single seat in the North Western District constituency, taken by Stephen Campbell, who became the first Amerindian member of the Guyanese parliament.

The party did not run in the 1961 elections, but returned to contest the 1964 elections. However, it received only 177 votes and failed to win a seat. The party did not contest any further elections.
