= Parental respect (disambiguation) =

Parental respect is deference to parents.

Parental respect may also refer to:

- Filial piety, a tradition in East Asia
- Familialism, an ideology that prioritizes family over individuals
- Islam and children, for the traditions in Islam
- Pietas, a tradition in ancient Rome
- Honour thy father and thy mother, a commandment in Judaism and Christianity
