= Queen's College, Georgetown =

Queen's College
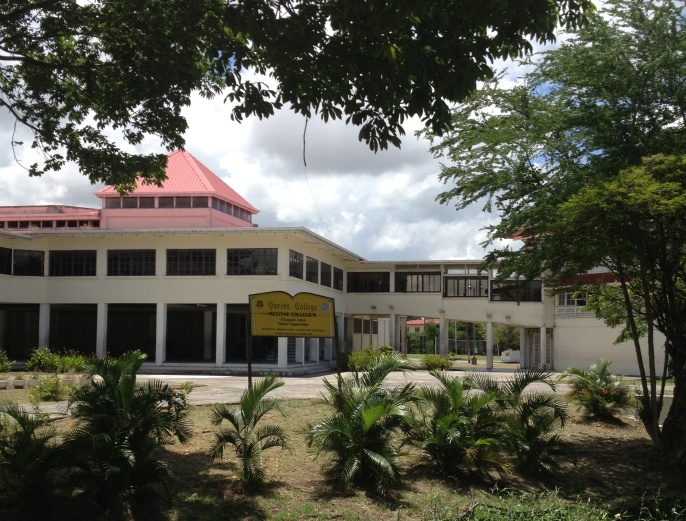

Location
- Georgetown; Guyana; 6.8142848°N 58.1637347°W

Information
- Other name: QC
- Type: Public secondary school
- Motto: Latin: Fideles Ubique Utiles (Faithful and Useful Everywhere)
- Gender: Co-educational
- Website: www.queenscollege.edu.gy

Queen's College (QC) is a secondary school in Georgetown, Guyana.

== History ==
It was established in 1844 by Bishop William Piercy Austin as an Anglican grammar school for boys and was aimed at educating the colonial elite. The school was temporarily quartered at what is the current location of the High Court before moving to another property at Main and Quamina Street until 1854. The current site of Bishops' High School was the location of Queen's College from 1854 to 1918. From there it moved to another property at Brickdam and Vlissingen Road, until 1951, when it moved to its current location. The final move saw significant expansion of classrooms and facilities, however an arson attack destroyed 1997.

In 1876, the Compulsory Denominational Education Bill secularized education and it became Queen's College of British Guiana as a national institution funded by the government. and in 1975 became co-ed.

The library was opened in 1880 and the school produced a variety of student papers, starting in 1881 as Our College Gazette, QC Gazette, the Queen's Chronicle and, the QC Lictor newspaper in 1950. The school also produced The Queen's College Magazine yearly from about 1912 to the 1974-76 edition.

== Accomplishments ==
The school has received the Dennis Irvine Award for academic excellence in the Caribbean 3 times and the Caribbean Secondary Education Certificate examinations premier science award 6 times.

== Traditional Organization ==
The school has a House system of 10 houses, named in honor of famous people to the history of Guyana; William Exley Percival, Walter Raleigh, Bishop Austin, Benjamin D'Urban, Edward Oliver Pilgrim, Frederick Thomas Weston, Edwin Moulder, Charles Campbell Woolley, John Henry Dacres Cunningham, and Captain Howard Nobbs. By convention, siblings are often put into the same house, and could also apply to other relatives and the children of previous students.

== Notable alumni ==
- Michael Abbensetts, playwright
- Norman Beaton, actor
- E. R. Braithwaite, novelist
- Forbes Burnham, former president
- John Carter, politician, lawyer and diplomat
- Martin Carter, poet
- Guy E. L. de Weever, author of The Children's Story of Guyana
- Phil Edwards, athlete, physician
- Tommy Eytle, actor and calypso musician
- Rhona Fox, actress
- David Granger, former president
- Roger Harper, former West indies cricketer
- Wilson Harris, novelist
- Samuel Hinds, Prime Minister
- Dr. Cheddi Jagan, former president
- Jack London, athlete
- Sir Lionel Luckhoo, lawyer
- Trevor Phillips, British politician
- Robert Cyril Gladstone Potter, educator and composer of Dear Land of Guyana, of Rivers and Plains
- Walter Rodney, historian, politician
- Arthur J. Seymour, literary critic, poet, biographer
- Ashni Singh, politician
