= Edwin Moulder =

Guyanese cricketer

Personal information
- Born: 9 October 1873; Georgetown, British Guiana
- Died: 21 November 1942 (aged 69); Barbados
- Source: Cricinfo, 19 November 2020

Edwin Moulder (9 October 1873 – 21 November 1942) was a cricketer from British Guiana. He played in sixteen first-class matches for British Guiana from 1901 to 1913.

He was born in Friendship Village, East Coast Demerara. His father was a former vicar. After attending attended Queens College, he won the Guiana Scholarship in 1891, going on to read Modern History at New College School and Merton College, Oxford earning his BA (Hons) in 1896 and his MA in 1908.

Moulder began teaching in 1899 in Kent, Winchester then Barbados until he was appointed Assistant Master at Queen's College in 1901. He also served as Inspector of Schools, Director of Primary Education, Examiner to the Education Department and as Censor in the First World War. He was appointed Principal of Queen's College in 1920 and retired in 1929.

He died in Barbados.

== See also ==
- List of Guyanese representative cricketers
