= Guy E. L. de Weever =

Guy Egbert Leon de Weever was a teacher, journalist and historian, best known for writing The Children's Story of Guyana, a staple geographical and historical text, used for 44 years (1932–1974) in Guyanese primary schools.

The book was reprinted almost every year until the mid-1970s, with one revision in 1949 (by Edna de Weever).

== Personal life ==
De Weever was born in March 1907 in Onderneeming, Essequibo, Guyana, to Paulina and Peter Moses de Weever, both teachers. His father was also a musical composer and an author.

He moved to Georgetown and attended Queen's College. He excelled at academic studies, especially in the history of the area, and he also did well at athletics.

De Weever died in May 1971.
