= Cane Grove =

- Village
- Location in Guyana
- Coordinates: 06°37′N 57°55′W
- Country: Guyana
- Region: Demerara-Mahaica

Population (2012)
  - Total: 1,630
- Time zone: UTC-4
- Climate: Af

Cane Grove is an agricultural community in the Demerara-Mahaica Region of Guyana, standing at sea level on the coastal plain, along the Mahaica River, about eight kilometres upstream of its mouth. Amabassador John Carter was born in Cane Grove.

The diaspora of Cane Grove hold an annual reunion in New York City where proceeds go toward funding various charity projects that help the current residents of the village.
