= Cyril Potter College of Education =

- CPCE Logo

Location
- Turkeyen Campus, Greater Georgetown; Guyana
- Coordinates: 6.817479°N 58.115358°W

Information
- Motto: Committed to providing the formal education system with academically and professionally trained teachers at the Nursery, Primary and Secondary levels
- Established: September 1928; 97 years ago
- Principal: Noella Joseph(ag)

The Cyril Potter College of Education (CPCE) is a higher education institution in Georgetown, Guyana.

The school's main campus is in Turkeyen, with an additional training center in Anna Regina.

== History ==
The college was established in September 1928. It was then known as the Teachers' Training Centre. Before 1928, local teachers traveled abroad for education, often in other Caribbean colleges such as Mico University College in Antigua, Shortwood Teachers College in Jamaica and Rawle College in Barbados. In 1942, the institution was renamed Government Training College for teachers (GTC).

In 1963, in addition to the full-time programme (this was referred to as Pre-Service), a part-time programme (In-Service) was launched. The Pre-Service programme catered to students between the ages of 17 and 24, while the In-Service mode catered to those above the age of 24 together with relevant teaching experience. Pre Service Secondary began in January 1969. It was referred to as the Multilateral Teachers' Training Programme. It was later called the College for Secondary Teachers and renamed the Lillian Dewar College of Education in honour of a woman who had given distinctive service to secondary education in Guyana.

In 1974 the College moved to newly completed building at Turkeyen. In 1976, it was renamed the Cyril Potter College of Education in honour of Robert Cyril Gladstone Potter, the first Guyanese principal of the institution.

Formal In-Service Nursery Training (NNTP) started in 1980. By 1983, all teacher-training was done at the Turkeyen campus. In September 1985, Pre-Service and In-Service Training activities were amalgamated under one administrative body.

In 2011, the Ministry of Education established the need for technical and vocational teachers.

The school received a donation from the government of China in order to improve their science facilities.

As a response to COVID-19 measures, in 2020 the Ministry of Education launched an online teacher training programme for CPCE and University of Guyana through a partnership with the Organization of American States (OAS) and the ProFuturo Foundation.

== Notable alumni and faculty ==
- Marc Matthews, award-winning Guyanese writer, actor, broadcaster and producer
- Robert Cyril Gladstone Potter, Guyanese educator and composer of the Guyanese National Anthem
- Stanley Praimnath, businessman, Christian pastor, one of few survivors from the impact zone of the September 11 attacks in New York City
