= Cyril Potter =

Guyanese educator and composer of the national anthem (1899–1981)

Robert Cyril Gladstone Potter (1899–1981) was an educator and composer from Guyana and the namesake of the Cyril Potter College of Education. He also composed the national anthem of Guyana, Green Land of Guyana.

Potter was born at Graham's Hall in Guyana in 1899. He graduated Queen's College, Guyana and from Mico University College in Jamaica and also received an honors B.A. in English from the University of London. Potter then returned to Guyana and taught and served Headmaster at Teachers Training Centre from 1933 to 1941 and then from 1941 to 1945 as acting Master of Queen's College. The teacher's college was later renamed after him as the Cyril Potter College of Education. In 1966 Potter composed the national anthem of Guyana, Green Land of Guyana, Potter died in 1981.
