= Sara Lou Harris Carter =

American model (1923–2016)

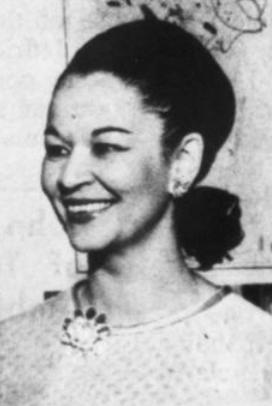
- Sara Lou Harris Carter, from a 1968 publication of the US Department of State
- Born: July 4, 1923; Wilkesboro, North Carolina
- Died: December 16, 2016 (aged 93)
- Spouse: John Carter

Sara Lou Harris Carter (July 4, 1923 – December 16, 2016) was a pioneering African-American model who also became known as an entertainer, educator and humanitarian.

She married lawyer and politician John Carter of Guyana and was known as Lady Sara Lou Carter after he was knighted in 1966.

Carter traveled extensively with her husband, living in capitals such as Washington, DC; London, and Beijing, while also serving at related cities in Europe and the Far East, while he served as ambassador and high commissioner for Guyana in a variety of postings. They retired to Washington, DC in 1983.

== Early life and education ==
She was born Sara Lou Harris in Wilkesboro, North Carolina, on July 4, 1923. Her father James was a house painter and her mother Esther worked in a cotton mill.

After attending segregated public schools as a child, Carter graduated in 1943 from Bennett College, an historically black college in Greensboro, North Carolina, with a BA in education. After graduation, she taught third grade in North Carolina.

She continued graduate studies, earning a master's degree at Columbia University in New York. While at Columbia, she supported herself by working as a model, actress, and dancer. This included work for radio and television.

== Career and marriage ==
In the 1940s Harris was the first African-American model to be featured in a national poster campaign for Lucky Strike cigarettes. She was the first African-American model in the annual New York buyers' fashion show, thus changing the role of the black woman model from servant to glamour girl. She was one of the first twelve models of the Branford Agency, the first to feature African-American models. She also performed as a singer and dancer with major orchestras of the time, and in films.

Working as a model and in media enlarged Harris's world. In 1958, while in British Guiana (now Guyana) for a major fashion show, she met barrister and politician John Carter of Guyana, who was assigned as her escort for some events. They married in 1959 and had two sons together. She also became stepmother to his two daughters from his first marriage.

Carter continued to be influential in supporting education and also became a philanthropist.

John Carter was active in his country's independence movement. He became a Queen's Counsel in 1962. in 1966, the year Guyana gained independence, he was knighted and appointed as ambassador to the United States and the United Nations, and high commissioner to Canada. With her husband's knighthood, Carter was known by the title 'Lady Sara Lou'. She served as the official hostess of his embassy postings.

Sara Lou Carter traveled with her husband when he was appointed high commissioner to the United Kingdom in 1970, as well as being accredited to France, West Germany, the Soviet Union and Yugoslavia. When Guyana joined the non-aligned nations, Sir John Carter was posted to China, and accredited also to Japan and North Korea.

They returned to the Caribbean in 1981, when Sir John was high commissioner to Jamaica. He and Lady Sara Lou Carter retired to Washington, DC in 1983. Sir John Carter died in June 2005.

In her later years, Sara Lou Carter suffered from Alzheimer's disease and died December 16, 2016. A granddaughter had died from cancer earlier that year. She was survived by three children: Robin (Carter) Marston, John Carter, Jr. and Brian Carter; and several grandchildren, cousins and close friends.

== Legacy ==
In 2019 Carter was inducted into the Wilkes County Hall of Fame in North Carolina, recognized for her international career and philanthropy.
