= Dear Land of Guyana, of Rivers and Plains =

National anthem of Guyana

Green Land of Guyana
- National anthem of Guyana
- Lyrics: Archibald Leonard Luker
- Music: Robert Cyril Gladstone Potter
- Adopted: 1966; 60 years ago

Audio sample
- U.S. Navy Band instrumental version (one verse): file; help

"Green Land of Guyana", also known by its opening line "Dear Land of Guyana", is the national anthem of Guyana. The music was composed by Robert Cyril Gladstone Potter, while the lyrics were authored by Archibald Leonard Luker. Two separate contests were held to determine the words and the tune, respectively. "Green Land of Guyana" was adopted as the national anthem in 1966, when the country gained independence from the United Kingdom.

== History ==
The British amalgamated the formerly Dutch colonies of Berbice, Demerara and Essequibo in 1814 into a single colony – British Guiana – and ruled over it until 1966. During the run up to independence in the early 1960s, several attempts were made by government committees to select the text to the new national anthem, but they all resulted in an impasse. Finally, in 1965, a fresh contest was held, and a new committee was formed, composed of individuals who possessed "broad literary and poetic backgrounds". The criteria they formulated for the anthem was that it should be august, inspire a love of country and evoke its unique characteristics, while at the same time be uncomplicated enough so that it could be comprehended by children. It was also supposed to be politically neutral, secular and dissimilar to the national anthems of other countries.

The competition saw a total of 266 entries submitted. The committee first narrowed this down to 40, and from that they chose 12 finalists. The lyrics penned by Archibald Leonard Luker were ultimately selected. A second contest was subsequently held to determine the music that was to accompany these lyrics. Another committee, consisting of a hundred people, selected from a blind audition. The identities of the composers were not revealed to them, so they chose from numbers that corresponded to the respective songs. In the end, a tune composed by Cyril Potter was chosen.

== Lyrics ==
The first stanza of "Dear Land of Guyana, of Rivers and Plains" alludes to the country's geography. The other verses personify Guyana as a mother to its citizens, who have a duty of respect and protection of her.

Dear land of Guyana, of rivers and plains
Made rich by the sunshine, and lush by the rains,
Set gem-like and fair, between mountains and seas,
Your children salute you, dear land of the free.

Green land of Guyana, our heroes of yore,
Both bondsmen and free, laid their bones on your shore.
This soil so they hallowed, and from them are we,
All sons of one Mother, Guyana the free.

Great land of Guyana, diverse though our strains,
We're born of their sacrifice, heirs of their pains,
And ours is the glory their eyes did not see,
One land of six peoples, united and free.

Dear land of Guyana, to you will we give,
Our homage, our service, each day that we live;
God guard you, great Mother, and make us to be
More worthy our heritage, land of the free.
