= Farmor's School =

Coordinates: 51.7146°N 1.7785°W

- Leafield Road, Fairford, Gloucestershire; GL7 4JQ, England

Information
- Type: Academy
- Established: 1738
- Local authority: LEA
- School code: UK Company House ID: 07707979
- Department for Education URN: 137097 Tables
- Ofsted: Reports
- Head teacher: Mark John Surowiec
- Teaching staff: approx 100
- Gender: Mixed
- Enrollment: 1,044
- Average class size: 30
- Hours in school day: 8
- Colors: Blue and Yellow
- Slogan: "An Academy"
- Nickname: "Farmor's"
- Website: www.farmors.gloucs.sch.uk

Farmor's School is a secondary school with academy status in Fairford, Gloucestershire. Including the Sixth Form, the school currently has about 1,000 students on roll.

The school is supported by the Elizabeth Farmor Trust, founded in 2008. The trust assists the school by "advancing the education of the pupils at the school". For example, in 2011, the trust helped fund new computer hardware for the school.

== History ==
The school was founded in 1738, using a gift of £500 by Mary Barker and a bequest of £1,000 by Elizabeth Farmor. The original site of the school was next to St Mary's Church on the High Street - the current location of the Community Centre. When first opened, the school was called Fairford Free School and accepted 60 boys aged 5–12 from the town of Fairford. In 1817, children from outside Fairford were admitted, but had to pay fees, and the school began to accept girls in a separate section of the school and hired a mistress to teach them. Boys were taught religion, reading, writing and arithmetic, while girls were taught religion, reading and needlework.

The master of the school in 1866 was dismissed on grounds of neglect. In 1877 the school benefited when a charity set up 200 years before by Jane Mico for apprentices in Fairford was merged into the school.

The school's name in 1904 was Farmor's Endowed School, and it became co-educational in 1922, and the sections were combined under a single headmaster. It moved to its current location on Leafield Road in 1961 and became an 11 to 18 Comprehensive School in 1966.

In 1971 the school had 480 pupils and spent £200,000 on new buildings to accommodate the pupils who, with the raising of school leaving age, would continue their education as well as the children of workers employed by BAC in relation to Concorde at RAF Fairford.

In 2004 the School became a Business and Enterprise Specialist School. In 2007 the school was named a High Performing Specialist School and as a result of this it became a Science Specialist School.

In 2020, the school was taken to court over unfair dismissal of a member of staff, who shared posts on social media against LGBT+ inclusive education, in Higgs v Farmor's School. A subsequent appeal found that the school's decision of dismissal was disproportionate and amounted to unlawful direct discrimination.

== Academic performance ==
In 2012, 79% of GCSE students achieved 5 or more A* to C grades. At A-level, 81% received A* to C Grades.

In 2013, both GCSE and A-level results rose in comparison with the previous year, with 89.5% of GCSE students achieving 5 or more A* to C grades. At A-level, 85% received A* to C Grades.

In 2013 the school's rating was downgraded from its previous 'Outstanding' in both 2006 and 2010 to 'Good' by Ofsted. A more recent inspection in 2017 again downgraded the school’s Ofsted rating from 'Good' to 'Requires Improvement'. In 2021, the school and 6th Form once again rated 'Good'.

== Academy Conversion ==
In August 2011 the school, after a consultation, applied for and gained Academy status. The move came at a time when many schools across the county were converting.

== Academies Capital Maintenance Fund ==
In 2013, the school was awarded a grant totalling nearly £1 million by the Academies Capital Maintenance fund. The grants were used to complete the schools flat roof repairs and build a new sixth form learning centre. The existing sixth form was re-decorated during the construction of the new extension, which was completed in 2014.

== Notable former pupils ==
- Felix de Giles - jockey
