= List of high commissioners of Guyana to the United Kingdom =

Coordinates: 51.510176°N 0.191868°W

High Commissioner of Guyana to the United Kingdom High Commission of Guyana, London
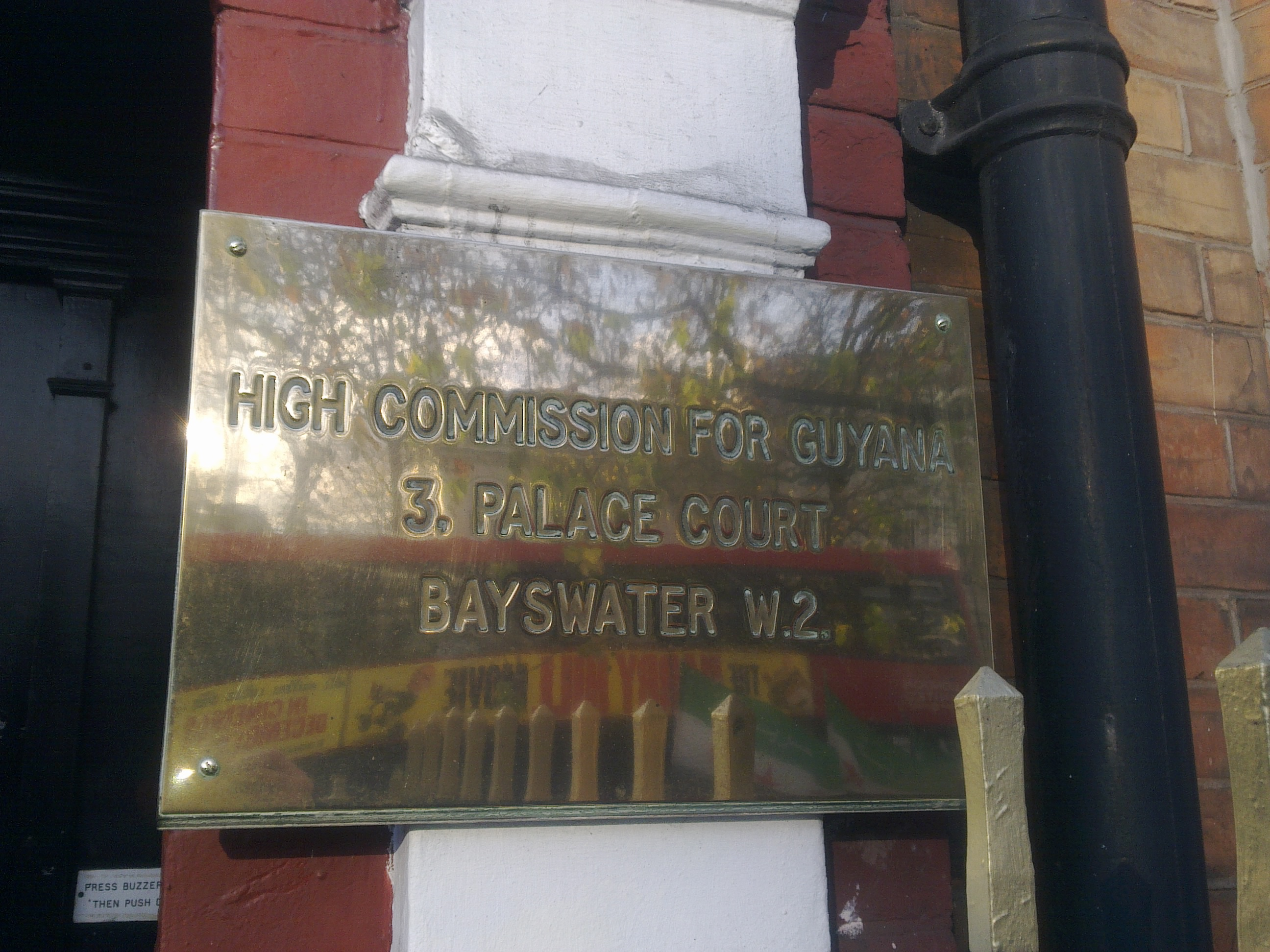
- Incumbent; Dr Rajendra Singh since May 2023
- Inaugural holder: Lionel Luckhoo
- Formation: 1966

The Guyanese high commissioner in London is the official representative of the government in Georgetown, Guyana to the government of the United Kingdom and is regularly accredited as ambassador in Paris, The Hague, Berlin, Warsaw and to the Holy See.

== List of representatives ==
Ambassador	Observations	Term	Term end
Lionel Luckhoo		1966	1970
Sir John Carter		1970	1976
Cedric Hilburn Grant		1977	1982
Cedric Luckie Joseph		1982	1986
Laleshwar Singh		1993	2015
Michael Brotherson	Chargé d'affaires	2008	2008
Marion Elizabeth Herbert	Chargé d'affaires (*1956)	2015	June 8, 2016
Frederick Hamley Case		June 8, 2016	
Dr Rajendra Singh		2023	
