= Mico University College =

Teacher-training college in Kingston, Jamaica

The Mico University College
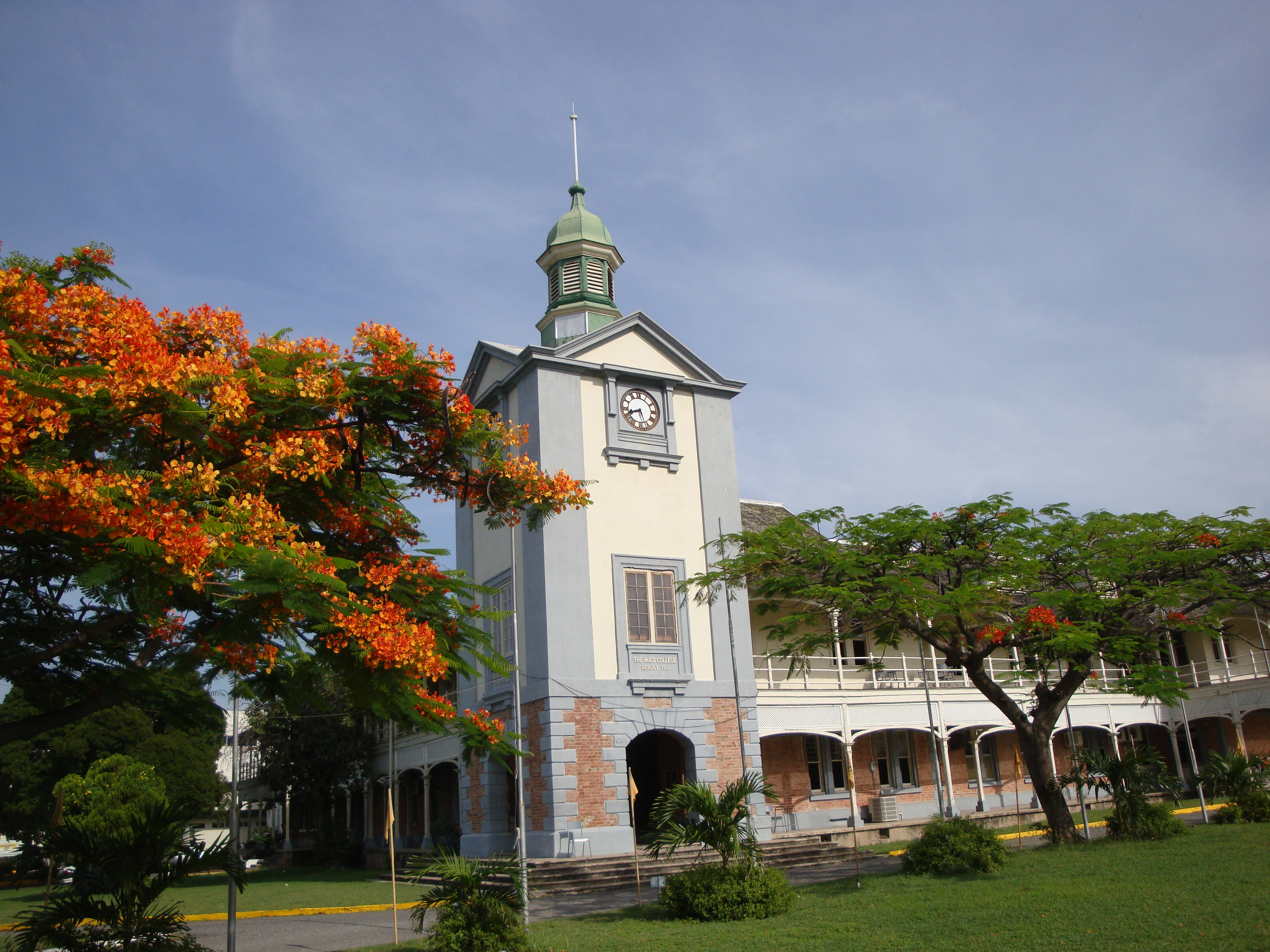
- Buxton House, The Mico University College
- Motto: Do It With Thy Might
- Type: Public
- Established: 1836; 190 years ago
- Endowment: Jane Mico
- Chancellor: Karl James
- President: Asburn Pinnock
- Vice-president: Albert Benjamin & Rudolph Sewell
- Students: 2,300+
- Location: 1a Marecaux Road, Kingston 5, Jamaica; 17.9885°N 76.7877°W
- Campus: Urban
- Colours: Black & Gold
- Nickname: The Mico
- Website: www.themico.edu.jm

The Mico University College is an institution of higher education in Kingston, Jamaica.

== History ==
The Mico was founded in 1835 through the Lady Mico Charity, as one of four teacher training institutions established during this period in the British colonies and the only one to survive until the present. Jane Mico had died in 1670 in England and she left £1,000 to relieve slavery and it accrued interest until it was worth over £100,000. Thomas Fowell Buxton and abolitionist judge Stephen Lushington took an interest in the bequest that had been stuck for 200 years. They believed that her bequest would supply education in Jamaica and elsewhere. They were able to establish a new set of trustees for Mico's funds. Lushington and Buxton were trustees and they obtained government grants that were used to supplement the fund.

The Mico University College was established as a non-denominational Christian institution that caters both to male and female students. Over the years the institution has undergone expansion and development both physically and in its academic programmes.

== Degree programmes ==
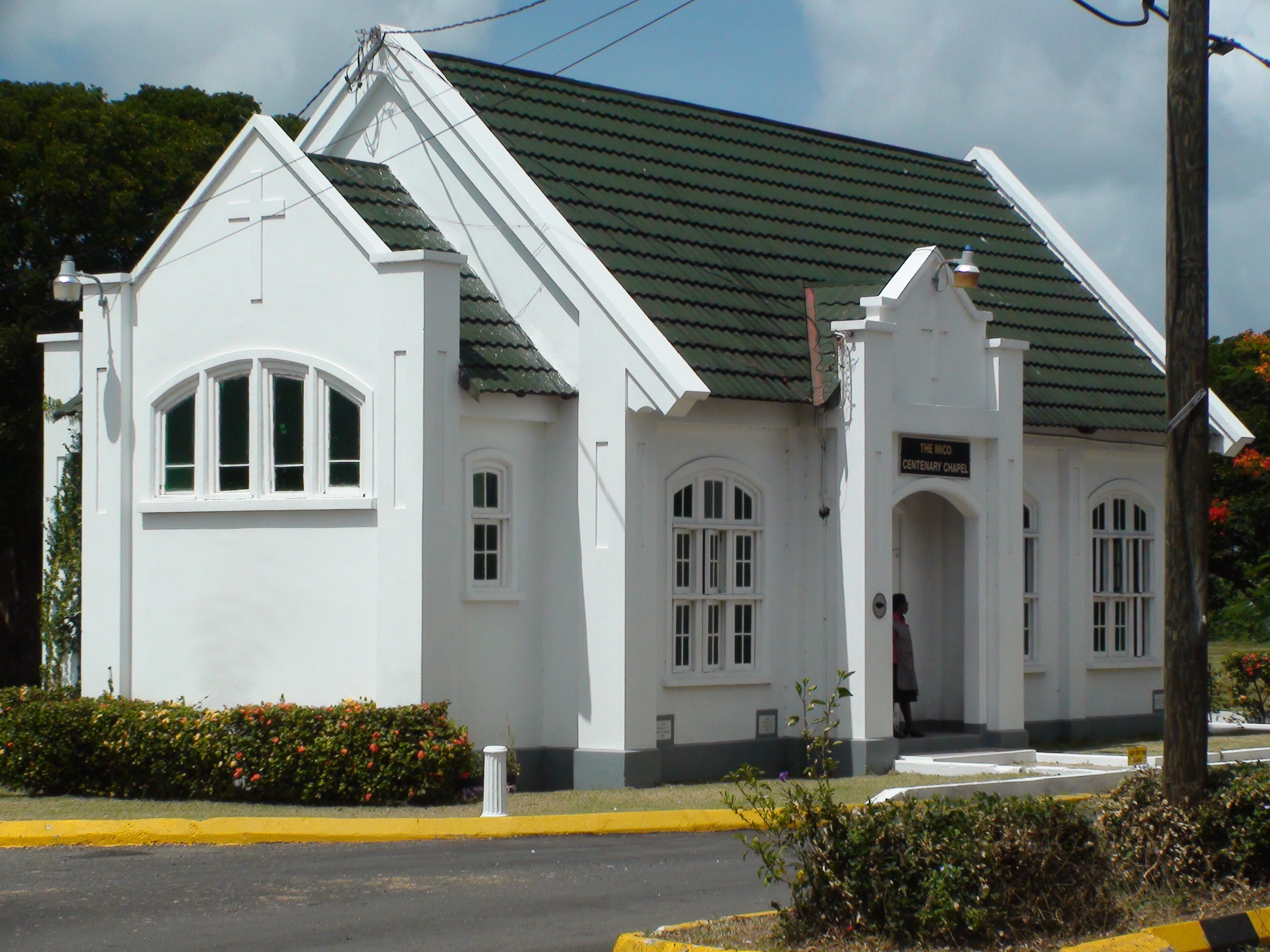
The Chapel

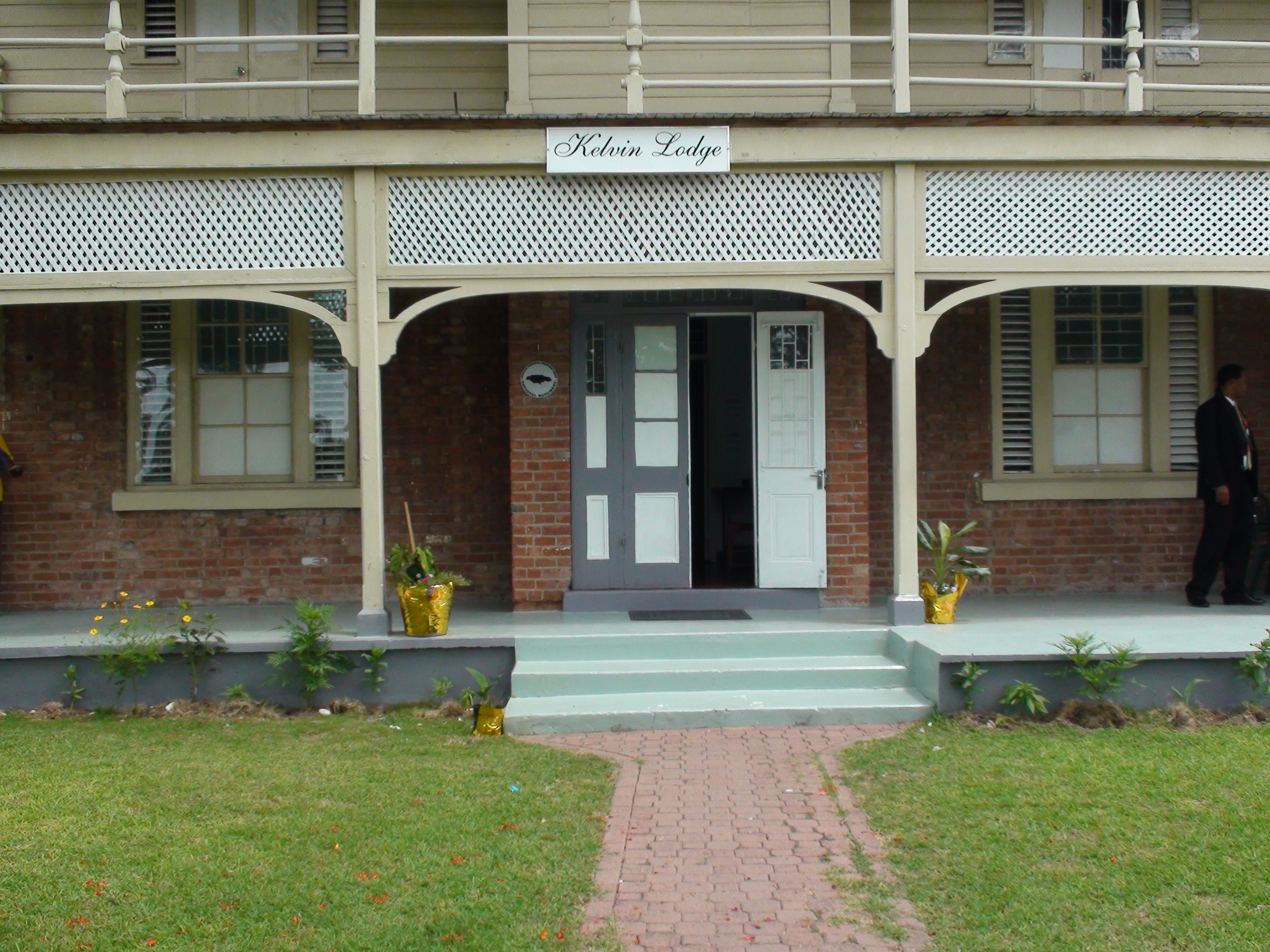
Kelvin Lodge

The Mico has offered certificate, diploma and degree programmes in:

- early childhood education
- primary education
- secondary education
- special education
- education administration

The programmes that the institution offers include bachelors and master's degree programmes in computer science, language and literacy, information studies, literature and literacy, guidance and counselling, physical education, social studies, school management and leadership, special education, early childhood education, geography and environmental studies, heritage studies, history and culture, arts in education, science education, mathematics education, industrial technology and family and consumer science.

The primary and secondary programmes offered at the Mico University College result in a BEd (specialization) after successful completion of four-year study. All BEd degrees are accredited or awaiting accreditation by the University Council of Jamaica.

== Management ==
The Mico University College is managed by a board of directors and The Mico Foundation which has a 12-member board. The President is a member of each board. He is the Managing director of the Foundation.

The President of the University College as of 2015 is Asburn Pinnock. He is assisted by three vice presidents.

In December 2008, Errol Miller was appointed as chancellor of the institution. The Pro-Chancellor is R. Karl James.

The University College offers undergraduate degree programmes through three faculties: the Faculty of Education and Liberal Arts, the Faculty of Humanities and the Faculty of Science and Technology. Each faculty is managed by a dean.

Additionally, further studies are being offered through the School of Continuing Studies which supports students in upgrading their qualifications to enable them to matriculate into undergraduate and graduate programmes.

== Facilities ==
=== Residence ===
There are two halls of residence for male students, Glen Owen Hall and Mills Hall, located on the main campus. The female students reside close by at the Errol Miller Hostel. The students are assisted on halls by resident advisors most of whom are alumni who volunteer their services to the university college. The student leadership on hall is directed by a hall chairman elected by residents of the hall.

Students on the male students halls of residence live according to their houses. Mills Hall accommodate students from Arthur Grant House, Bishop House, Buxton House and Some members of Lushington House (Rooms 21-24). Glen Owen Hall Accommodates Lushington (rooms A-J) and Rodgers House (Rooms K-X) members. Each house is headed by a House Captain who is generally a final year student.

=== Health ===
There are resident nurses who attend to the medical needs of students and staff. They operate from The Mico Health Centre, located centrally on the main campus.

=== Meals ===
Students are served meals daily at the Bonham Carter Hall. The cafeteria serves lunch and supper to students and staff of the institution. Breakfast is provided for students and staff on the weekends.

=== Museum ===
There is a museum located on the main campus which boasts The Mico INAFCA collection donated by a past student Aston Taylor. The curator and senior lecturer is Hyacinth Birch. There are collections on education in Jamaica among items donated by past students. The museum also contains a collection on the history of the institution.

It is the first museum of education in Jamaica, a collaborative venture with the Institute of Jamaica, and was established on 31 March 2004. Under the theme, "Winds of Change: the Evolution of Education in Jamaica," it aims to feature the growth of education from the pre-emancipation era to the present. The concept behind its formation is that students especially need knowledge of the past in order to sustain the future. The museum was declared opened by an outstanding Miconian, the Most Hon. Sir Howard Cooke, former Governor General of Jamaica.

== Notable graduates ==
Student Name	Year Of Attendance	Achievements
Sir Howard Cooke	1933-	Minister of Education, Pastor -United Church, Chancellor International University of the Caribbean Governor General Of Jamaica (1991–2006)
Sir Clifford Campbell		Governor General Of Jamaica (1962–1973)
Robert Cyril Gladstone Potter		Educator, Composer of Guyana's National Anthem and Namesake of the Cyril Potter College of Education
Catherine Mulgrave		Angolan-Jamaican Moravian missionary and educator on the Gold Coast, now Ghana

== Past principals ==
The following have served as principals of the institution:

Name of Principal	Year Of Service
William Gillies/ L. G. Gruchy	1884–1898
A. B. McFarlane	1898–1919
John Hartley Duff	1920–1923
Arnold A. Moore (acting)	1923–1924
A. J. Newman	1924–1959
John James Mills	1943–1945
Glenville H. Owen	1959–1972
Errol Miller	1972–1981
Renford Archibald Shirley	1981–1996
Claude Montgomery Packer	1996–2014
Asburn Pinnock	2015–present

== Historic buildings ==
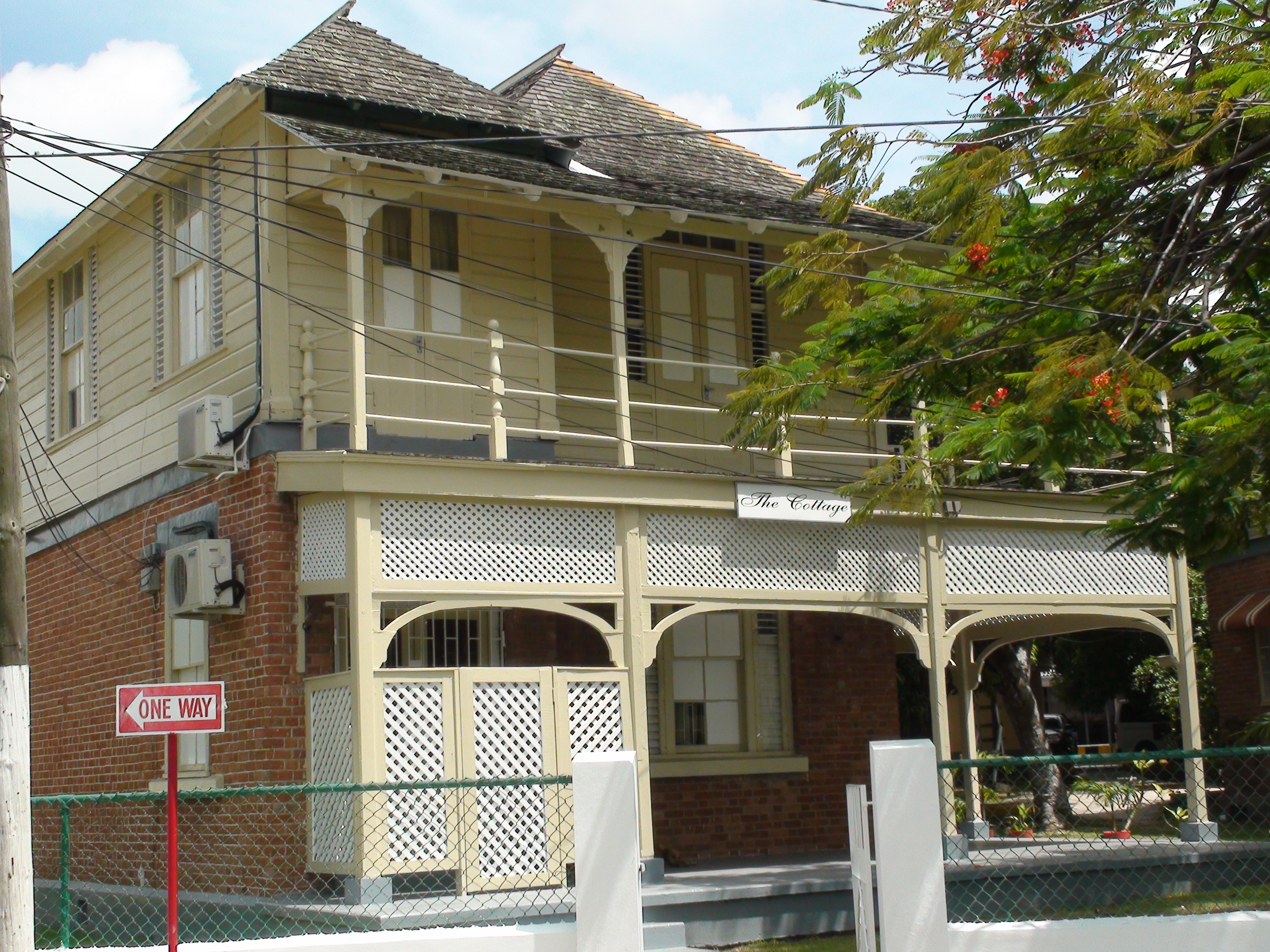
The Cottage

Four of the institutions buildings have been declared as National Heritage Sites by the Jamaica National Heritage Trust:

=== Buxton House ===
The Buxton House contains the President's Office, Human Resources Department, the Vice President's Office and classrooms.

=== Kelvin Lodge ===
The Kelvin Lodge is the current home of the Alumni and Development Office.

=== The Cottage ===
The Cottage is the current home of the Mico Foundation.

==== The Chapel ====
The University's Chapel is a religious education center. It houses the Bishop House members in extracurricular activities in religion. It is also used as a place of worship for student and staff.
