= Jane Mico =

- Born: Jane Robinson in or before 1634 maybe Hertfordshire
- Died: 1670
- Other names: Jane, Lady Mico
- Occupation: Benefactor
- Known for: her will
- Spouse: Samuel Mico
- Children: none

Jane, Lady Mico born Jane Robinson (in or before 1634 – 1670) was an English benefactor. The clauses in her will intended to relieve slavery, still manifests itself in the creation of Mico University College in Jamaica. Her almshouses in London continue and her bequest to Fairford's apprentices continues to educate at the Farmor's School.

== Life ==
She was born in or before 1634 and her parents were Elizabeth (born Burrell) and William Robinson of Cheshunt in Hertfordshire. At some time she married Samuel Mico who was a successful London merchant. His first wife, Elizabeth had died in 1640 and in 1641 the last two of children born during that marriage also died and were buried with their mother at St Stephen Walbrook church in London.

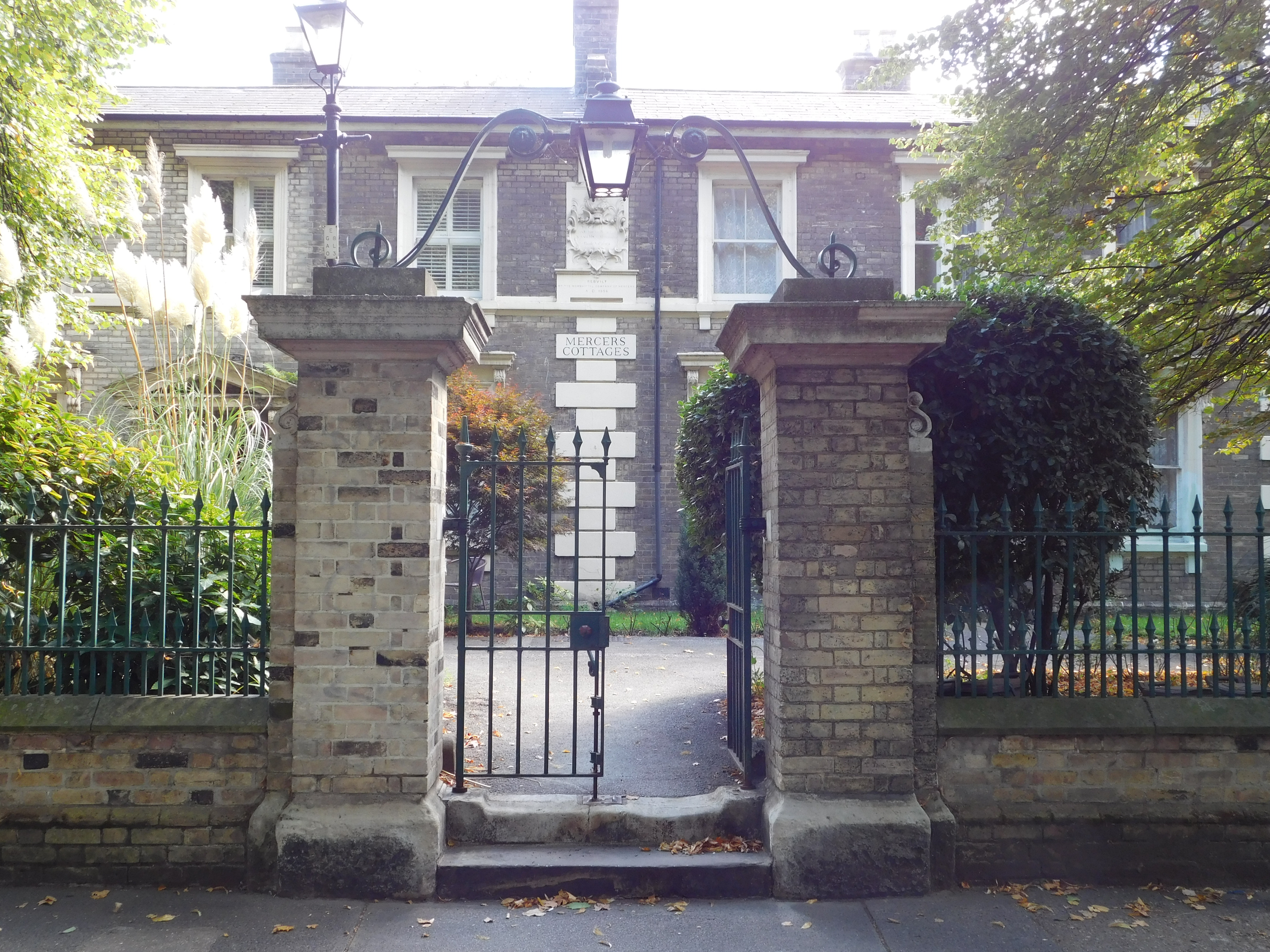
Lady Mico's almhouses in London

She was left all her husband's "houshold stuff, plate and jewells" and everything that was due to a wife by custom. She made her name with the will that she drew up on 1 June 1670. She must have died that year as her will was proved on 9 December 1670. Her will had significant clauses. She gave £400 to the town of Fairford to assist any poor apprentices and this charity operated until 1877 when it was merged with Fairford free school. She gave £100 to assist an extant almshouse and another £1,500 to build more almshouses for widows in London. This money was not sufficient so it was left in the care of the Mercer's company and in time it had become £2,700 when building started.

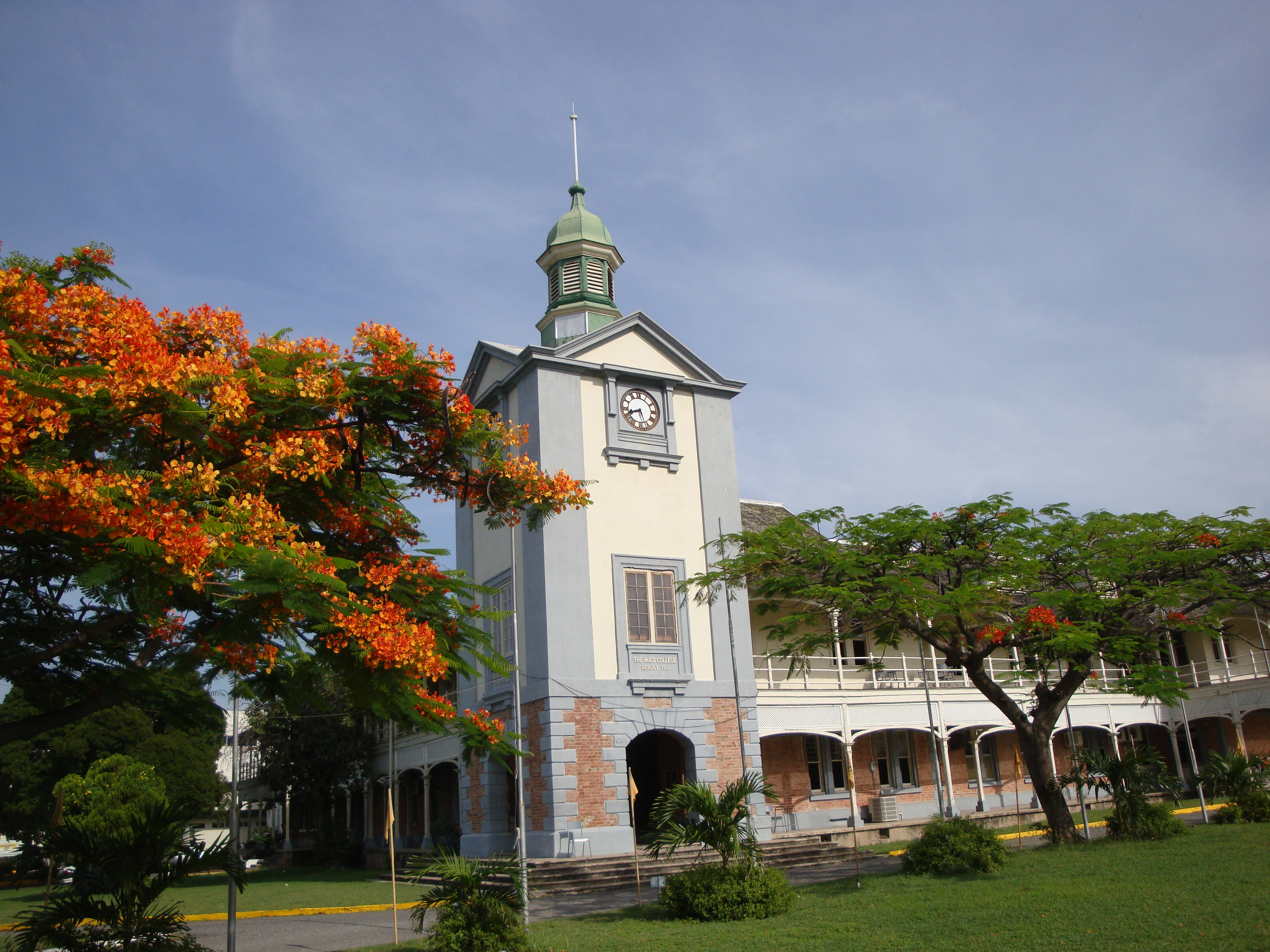
Mico University College in Kingston, Jamaica is run by the Mico Foundation

The clauses of her will that lasted the longest concerns gifts made to her nephew (another) Samuel Mico. She left him £2,000 which he would get were he to marry one of her nieces. If he failed then £1,000 would go to save Christian slaves in Tangiers. In 1688 her nephew Samuel received £100 a year from these funds towards his education at Magdalen College, Oxford after he made an appeal in the chancery courts. He completed his education and claimed the whole of his inheritance but the excucutors resisted on the grounds that he was not yet reached the age of majority (21). He did receive the bulk of his inheritance but he died in December 1679 and he was therefore unable to marry a niece and claim the conditional £1,000.

The court of chancery required that this £1,000 be used to ameliorate slavery as required by her will. It ordered that £50 be set aside for two wharfs but it was not until 1731 that at was proposed that Sir Charles Wager use 75% of the remaining inheritance to spend the money in Jamaica in line with the legacy but nothing happened. In 1827 the master of the Chancery Courts was tasked with problem. By this time legacy was then worth over £120,000 and it accrued over £3,000 per annum in interest. The leading abolitionists Thomas Fowell Buxton who was a member of parliament and Stephen Lushington who was a lawyer took an interest as did the abolitionist Zachary Macaulay and James Stephen of the colonial office. They believed that education would benefit the colonies and the mother country by supplying education and in particular religious education. They were able to establish a new set of trustees were established for the funds. Lushington and Buston were trustees and they obtained government grants ("Negro Education Grant") that were used to supplement the fund.

Initially the fund started to create schools across the West Indies including the Mico Institution in Jamaica in 1836. Even after the government lost interest in 1847 the trustees were working in Jamaica, Antigua, and St Lucia. By 1890 the trustees were just focussing on Jamaica. The Mico Institution became the Mico Teachers' College which today is the Mico University College. Both Buxton and Lushington are remembered in house names at the university.
