= Samuel Mico =

Sir Samuel Mico (1608–1666) was a London Merchant who traded out of the port of Weymouth in Dorset. He established a charity that is extant and left a fortune to his wife the benefactress Lady Jane Mico.

== Life ==
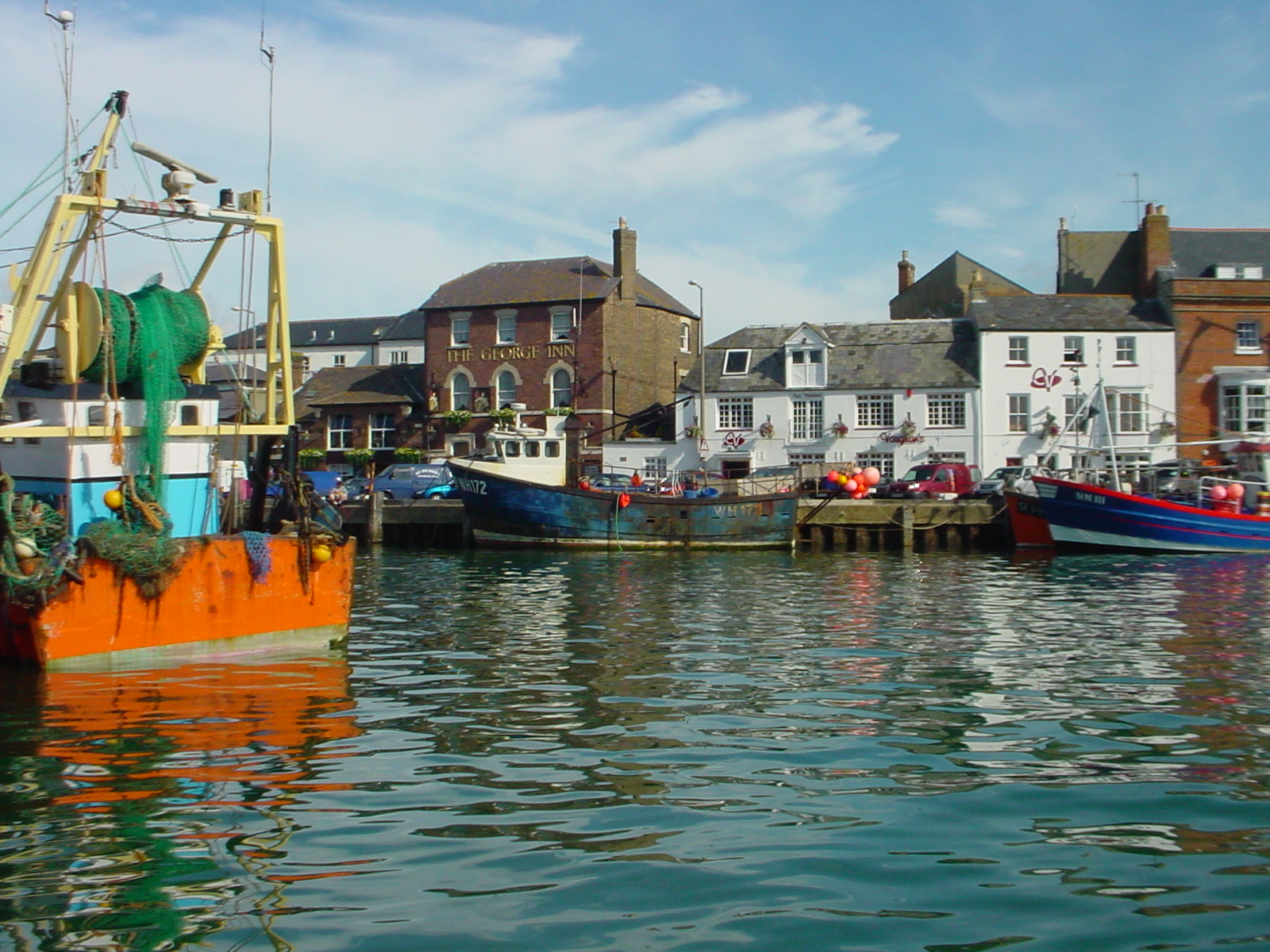
Weymouth Harbour in 2005 showing Mico's George Inn

Mico was baptised in St Mary's Church, Weymouth on 22 March 1608. Mico was made a Freeman of the City of London on 26 March 1633. Mico was listed in "The Most Wealthy Inhabitants of London" in 1640 when he was only 32. He was Master of the Mercers Company in 1655. Sir Samuel Mico was knighted on 18 March 1665, however there was no official citation with regards to his knighthood, although records kept by the College of Arms suggests “that he was knighted in consideration of a liberal subscription to King Charles II’s loan of £100,000 which was made to him about 1664”.

Sir Samuel died before 24 May 1666 when his will was proved. He left a fortune to his wife the benefactress Lady Jane Mico and her will created schools in the Caribbean. He had been buried in the Mercers' Chapel, London.

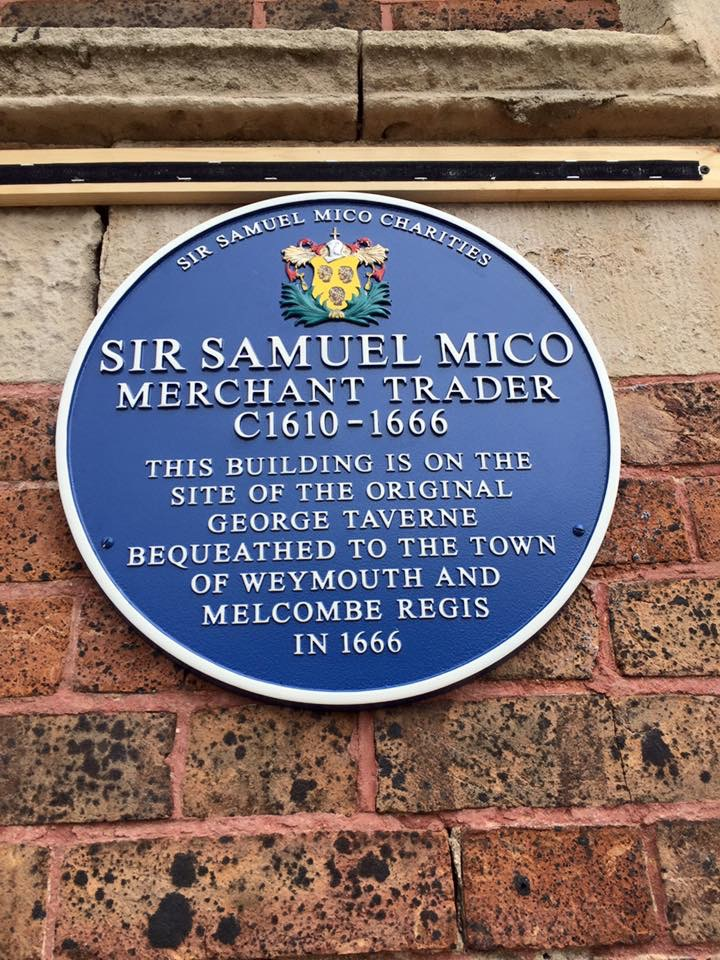
The plaque marking The George Taverne

Mico owned the George Inn on Weymouth Quay, which he stayed in when he was in the town. His will dated 25 September 1665 left money to the people of Weymouth, to provide for the apprenticing of three boys, the payment of a pension to ten seamen who had reached 60 and the preaching of an annual sermon at a service to be held of the Friday before Palm Sunday each year at which trustees, apprentices and seamen should attend. The money which was invested together with the income from the rental of The George Inn, still funds a charity today that follows Mico's wishes called the Sir Samuel Mico Charities which is managed under the umbrella of Weymouth Town Charities.
