= United Democratic Party (British Guiana) =

The United Democratic Party (UDP) was a political party in British Guiana led by John Carter.

== History ==
The UDP was established in 1955 by a merger of the National Democratic Party and other factions. In the 1957 elections the party put forward eight candidates for the 14 constituencies. It received 8% of the vote, winning one seat; Rudy Kendall in New Amsterdam.

In 1959 the party merged into the People's National Congress.
