= Lionel Luckhoo =

Guyanese politician, diplomat and lawyer

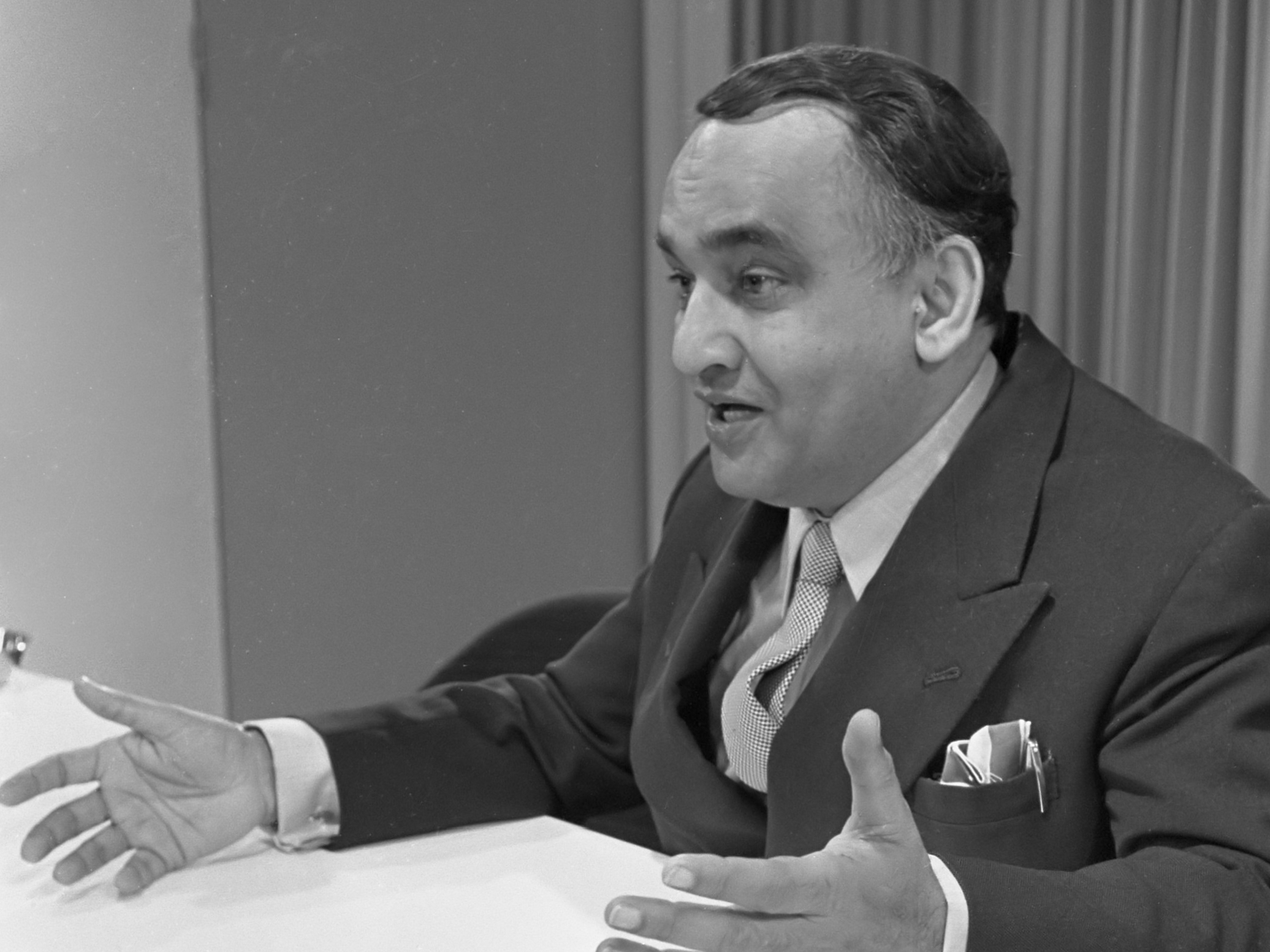
Lionel Luckhoo (1968)

Sir Lionel Alfred Luckhoo KCMG CBE QC (2 March 1914 – 12 December 1997) was a Guyanese politician, diplomat, and lawyer, famed for his 245 consecutive successful defences in murder cases. He was the brother of the last Governor-General of Guyana, Sir Edward Luckhoo.

== Life and legal career ==
Luckhoo's grandfather, Moses Luckhoo, was one of many Indians brought to Guyana as indentured labourers in the sugar cane industry in the mid-19th century. In 1899, Sir Lionel's father, Edward Alfred Luckhoo, became the first Indian solicitor of Guyana.

Luckhoo was born in New Amsterdam, British Guiana, and was one of three sons and two daughters born into a prominent family of lawyers. His mother was Evelyn Maude Mungal-Singh, and his sisters were Ena Luckhoo and Renee Luckhoo. His two brothers, Edward Victor Luckhoo and Claude Lloyd Luckhoo, became Queen's Counsels.

He was educated at Queen's College, Georgetown, Guyana. Then he began studying medicine at St. Thomas' Hospital in England but quickly felt squeamish about surgical procedures. He shifted over to legal studies and was called to the English bar in the Middle Temple in 1940. At the same time that Allied troops were evacuating from Dunkirk in World War II, Luckhoo left England for his homeland. He entered into a solicitor's practice with one of his brothers in the firm Luckhoo and Luckhoo.

He maintained his private legal practice spanning most of the years from 1940 to 1985, and became a Queen's Counsel in 1954. His reputation earned him an entry in the Guinness Book of Records (1990) where he is dubbed the world's "most successful lawyer". The record is for obtaining as a defence trial lawyer 245 successive murder acquittals. In a few instances his clients were found guilty in jury trials, but were acquitted in appeal cases. He also practised as a barrister in England and later served as a judge of the Supreme Court of Guyana.

Part of his courtroom technique is reported in Fred Archer's biography of Sir Lionel Luckhoo:

"Pick out two individuals. Look for one who is nodding his head and seems to be agreeing with you; then seek out another who is turning his head away because you do not convince him. Speak first to the one who is nodding. When you think you have won him over completely, move on to the one who appears dubious. Concentrate on him, look him in the eye make him feel that you are eschewing everything else to hold his attention because the life of your client is in his hands and that he must be convinced, as he ought to be convinced, that your man is innocent and deserves an acquittal." (Sir Lionel, p. 33)

He also came to notoriety as the legal personal representative of the Reverend Jim Jones. Jones was the founder and leader of the People’s Temple Church, and had left California in the 1970s to establish a commune in Guyana known as Jonestown. A dispute arose between Jones and two former members, Timothy Stoen and Grace Stoen. The Stoens alleged that Jones was holding their child, John Victor Stoen, in the commune. Jones maintained he was the biological father and acknowledged Grace Stoen was the child's mother. The Stoens had obtained an order for custody of the child in the California Superior Court in August 1977. As the Stoens commenced legal proceedings in Georgetown to have the court order enforced in January 1978, Jones made contact by short-wave radio with Sir Lionel Luckhoo. Jones threatened that he, John Victor, and the whole commune would commit suicide rather than have the boy released. Luckhoo managed to talk Jones out of taking this course of action at that time. However, on 18 November 1978, Jones alongside hundreds of his followers living in the commune, perished in a mass murder suicide, John Victor Stoen was among the dead.

== Politician and diplomat ==
In addition to his legal practice, Luckhoo also had a political career. He was the head of four trade unions, including the Manpower Citizens' Association, and served in the Legislative Council between 1952 and 1953. He served as the Lord mayor of Georgetown in 1955, 1956, 1960 and 1961. In the late 1950s he established the conservative political party the National Labour Front, which contested the 1957 general elections. However, Luckhoo was unsuccessful in his bid to be elected as Prime Minister, and his party only won one seat.

He was also involved in the negotiations for independence of both Guyana and Barbados. He was appointed High Commissioner for Guyana and Barbados in Britain (1966–1970), and was also Ambassador for both countries. From 1967 to 1970 he served as joint ambassador for Guyana and Barbados in France, Germany and the Netherlands. During this time he was joking referred to as 'the only man at the British Commonwealth of Nations who had two-votes.'

He served as the President of the Guyana Olympic Association from 1974 to 1979. He was also a notable figure in the Guyanese horse racing industry, and owned several race horses. He also owned an island and a resort hotel.

== Personal life ==
He was married to Sheila Chamberlin, and had two sons and three daughters with her. This marriage ended in divorce in 1972, and he remarried Jeannie Willis Carter. His second wife is a genealogist.

== British honours ==
In Queen Elizabeth II's 1962 Birthday Honours, Luckhoo was made a Commander of the Order of the British Empire (CBE), was made a knight bachelor in 1966, and received the KCMG (Knight Commander of St Michael and St George) in 1969.

== Religious beliefs ==
Luckhoo was raised in a nominal Christian setting. However, at age 64, he experienced a profound religious conversion at a meeting he attended on 7 November 1978 that was sponsored by the Full Gospel Business Men's Fellowship International (FGBMFI); thereafter, he actively participated in the Protestant Evangelical movement of Christianity.

After his conversion, he established Luckhoo Ministries in Fort Worth, Texas, and became an itinerant speaker about his Christianity in Guyana, England, Australia and the United States of America. He wrote several booklets where he presented Christian apologetics arguments to persuade others about faith in Christ. Booklets included titles such as What is Your Verdict?, The Question Answered: Did Jesus Rise from the Dead?, and The Quran is not the Word of God. He also co-wrote an apologetics-based novel, The Silent Witness. Luckhoo's contributions to apologetics identify him with both the evidentialist school of thought, and the tradition known as legal or juridical apologetics. His spiritual life and apologetics contributions have been discussed in the writings of Ross Clifford, Lee Strobel and Josh McDowell.

== Biographical sources ==
- McFarlan, D. (Ed.) The Guinness book of records 1990 (Enfield: Guinness Publishing Ltd., 1989) p. 211. ISBN 0-85112-341-4 (Note: There are three distinct editions of the 1990 edition of the Guinness Book of World Records: one with the ISBN ISBN 0-8069-5790-5, one with the ISBN ISBN 0-553-28452-5, and one with the ISBN ISBN 0-85112-341-4. The one with the ISBN ISBN 0-85112-341-4 is the only edition that lists Luckhoo's record.)
- Fred Archer, Sir Lionel (Costa Mesa: Gift Publications, 1980). ISBN 0-86595-005-9
- Ross Clifford, Leading Lawyers Look at The Resurrection (Sutherland: Albatross Books/Oxford: Lion, 1991). ISBN 0-86760-127-2
- Lee Strobel, The Case for Christ (Grand Rapids: Zondervan), 1998.

== Bibliography ==
- The Silent Witness: A Novel (with John R. Thompson) (Nashville: Thomas Nelson, 1995). ISBN 0-7852-8007-3
