= David Arthur Singh =

Guyanese diplomat and politician

Minister of Housing & Reconstruction.
- In office 1969 – October 23, 1973
- Succeeded by: Shiw Sahai Naraine, popularly known as "Steve Naraine",

Guyanese Ambassadors to China from Guyana to China
- In office October 23, 1973 – 1976
- Succeeded by: John Carter

Personal details
- Born: May 28, 1929 Golden Fleece, West Coast, Berbice
- Died: 1978 (aged 48–49)
- Spouse: Thelma Singh
- Education: Secondary school Guayana, King's College London, 1955 : L.L.B.
- Occupation: M.P., barrister, legislator

David Arthur Singh (May 28, 1929 – 1978) was a Guyanese diplomat and politician.

== Career ==
- From 1945 to 1952 he was a primary school teacher.
- From 1957 to 1959 he practised as a barrister.
- In 1959 he was a Law Officer in the Attorney General's Chambers.
- 1967 returned to private practice.
- In 1968 he was elected Member of Parliament.
- From 1969 to October 23, 1973 he was Minister of Housing and Reconstruction.
- From October 23, 1973 to 1976 he was the first ambassador in Beijing.
