= David Joseph Singh =

American theoretical physicist

David Joseph Singh (born 1958) is a theoretical physicist who is a curators' professor in the Department of Physics and Astronomy at the University of Missouri in Columbia, Missouri. He was previously a corporate fellow at the Oak Ridge National Laboratory (ORNL).

== Early life and education ==
David Joseph Singh was born in Cedar Rapids, Iowa on June 23, 1958, and attended high school at Ashbury College in Ottawa, Canada. He obtained a summa cum laude B.Sc. (1980) and a Ph.D. (1985) in physics from the University of Ottawa in Canada. From 1985 to 1988, Singh had a postdoctoral appointment at the College of William and Mary. In 1988, Singh moved to join the theory group at the Naval Research Laboratory in Washington, D.C. From 1988 to 2004, he continued to work on a range of materials problems, including colossal magnetoresistance, at the Naval Research Laboratory.

In 2004, Singh left Washington to join the Oak Ridge National Laboratory, a United States Department of Energy facility, in Oak Ridge, Tennessee. In 2015, he moved to the University of Missouri.

== Career ==
Singh co-authored Planewaves, Pseudopotentials and the LAPW Method and approximately 500 publications in scientific journals. His general area of research is in condensed matter physics with a focus on electronic structure methods, ferroelectrics, thermoelectrics and iron-based superconductors. He has contributed to the application of density functional theory, especially to iron-based superconductors, and methods.

Along with his former colleague and a frequent collaborator Igor I. Mazin, Singh developed the sign-changing s-wave model for iron-based superconductors.

== Memberships and awards ==
Singh became a fellow of the American Physical Society in 1997. He was an editorial board member of the New Journal of Physics and Scientific Reports. He is also a Fellow of the Royal Society of Chemistry.

Singh was a corporate fellow at Oak Ridge National Laboratory. He received the E.O. Hulburt Annual Science Award and the Gordon Battelle Prize.
