= John Carter (ambassador) =

Guyanese politician, lawyer, and diplomat (1919–2005)

Sir John Carter QC

Guyanese Ambassador to the United States
- In office 18 July 1966 – 11 July 1970
- Succeeded by: Rahman Baccus Gajraj

Guyanese High Commissioner to the United Kingdom
- In office 1970–1975

Guyanese Ambassador to China
- In office 1976–1979
- Preceded by: David Arthur Singh
- Succeeded by: Cecil Pollydore

Guyanese High Commissioner to Jamaica
- In office 1981–1983

Personal details
- Born: 27 January 1919 Cane Grove Village on the East Coast of Demerara, British Guiana.
- Died: 23 February 2005 (aged 86) Suburban Hospital, Bethesda, Maryland, United States
- Spouse: Lady Sarah Lou Harris Carter
- Children: 4
- Education: London University

Sir John Carter, QC (27 January 1919 – 23 February 2005) was a Guyanese politician, lawyer and diplomat.

== Career ==
Born in Cane Grove, Demerara, he attended Queens College, Georgetown (then British Guiana)

From 1939 to 1945, during the Second World War, he studied and taught law in London. His legal expertise became invaluable when he worked on numerous discrimination cases to the League of Coloured Peoples. In 1944, he became involved in a case of an African-American soldier serving in Britain who had been condemned to death for rape by a US military court. In the end, the sentence was commuted.

In 1945, he returned to British Guiana and established a law practice. To his mandatories belonged Forbes Burnham and Desmond Hoyte. In 1948, he became the youngest member of the colony's legislative council.

In 1952, he founded the United Democratic Party; in 1957 Forbes Burnham convinced him to become the first chairman of the People's National Congress.

In 1962, Carter became a Queen's Counsel; he was knighted four years later. On 28 June 1966, he was appointed the first ambassador to the United States, based in Washington, D. C., where he was accredited from 18 July 1966 until 11 July 1970. He was concurrently accredited to the United Nations and was High Commissioner in Ottawa (Canada).

From 1970 to 1976, he was High Commissioner to the United Kingdom, based in London, and was concurrently accredited in Paris (France), Bonn (West Germany), Moscow (Soviet Union) and Belgrade (Yugoslavia). While he was High Commissioner in London, the government of Forbes Burnham nationalised a sugar company from Booker Group.

From 1976 to 1979 Carter was ambassador in Beijing with accreditation in Tokyo and Pyongyang (North Korea). From 1981 till his retirement in 1983, he was High commissioner (Commonwealth) in Kingston, Jamaica.

In 1983, he settled with his second wife, Sara Lou Harris from North Carolina, in Washington, D.C.. She had worked as an educator and groundbreaking model and actress. Carter died 23 February 2005 in Bethesda, Maryland.
