= Parental respect =

Social phenomenon

Parental respect refers to deference and associated actions directed towards one's parent(s). In most societies parental respect is a virtuous disposition. The extent of how much deference should be afforded to one's parents differ from region to region, with some recommending obedience.

== Perception ==
Although most societies afford a sense of virtue and respect to parents, in some societies such deference goes beyond the average and offspring are required by law to be heedful to their parents and be dutiful to their commands and instructions. Such a moral obligation is not necessarily static and may even be suspended during a spontaneous current event. This may be precipitated by any event that shines a negative light on parents, fosterers or guardians, such as a viral incident of physical abuse, psychological abuse, human rights abuse or sexual abuse.

== See also ==
- Filial piety
- Pietas
- Sibling relationship
