= Grade II* listed buildings in Wychavon =

Worcestershire shown within England

There are over 20,000 Grade II* listed buildings in England. This page is a list of these buildings in the district of Wychavon in Worcestershire.

== Wychavon ==
Name	Location	Type	Completed (Note: The date given is the date used by Historic England as significant for the initial building or that of an important part in the structure's description.)	Date designated	Grid ref. (Note: The grid reference is based on the British national grid reference system, sometimes known as OSGB36, used by the Ordnance Survey.) Geo-coordinates	Entry number (Note: The "List Entry Number" is a unique number assigned to each listed building and scheduled monument by Historic England.)	Image
Church of St Barbara	Ashton under Hill, Wychavon	Parish Church	12th century	30 July 1959	SO9967137712; 52°02′16″N 2°00′22″W	1081663	Church of St Barbara More images
Badsey Hall	Badsey, Wychavon	House	Late 17th century	30 July 1959	SP0699543004; 52°05′07″N 1°53′58″W	1081602	Badsey Hall
Church of St James	Badsey, Wychavon	Parish Church	12th century	30 July 1959	SP0709643114; 52°05′11″N 1°53′52″W	1081600	Church of St James More images
The Manor House	Badsey, Wychavon	House	Mid C20	30 July 1952	SP0697743397; 52°05′20″N 1°53′59″W	1157643	The Manor House
Norman Cottage	Grafton, Beckford, Wychavon	House	12th century	30 July 1959	SO9862137303; 52°02′03″N 2°01′17″W	1167342	Upload Photo
Besford Court	Besford, Wychavon	House	1912	11 February 1965	SO9146645237; 52°06′19″N 2°07′34″W	1259955	Besford Court More images
Church of St Peter	Besford, Wychavon	Church	14th century	11 February 1965	SO9108844771; 52°06′04″N 2°07′53″W	1242557	Church of St Peter More images
Eckington Bridge	Birlingham, Wychavon	Bridge	1728	11 February 1965	SO9222242328; 52°04′45″N 2°06′54″W	1116724	Eckington Bridge More images
Church of St James	Bishampton, Wychavon	Church	12th century	11 February 1965	SO9899351840; 52°09′53″N 2°00′58″W	1259934	Church of St James More images
Rectory	Bredon, Wychavon	House	16th century	11 February 1965	SO9200337070; 52°01′55″N 2°07′05″W	1117042	Upload Photo
Barn about 40m north of Breforton Grange	Bretforton, Wychavon	Barn	15th century	30 July 1959	SP0864844227; 52°05′47″N 1°52′31″W	1301470	Upload Photo
Bretforton Grange	Bretforton, Wychavon	House	1635	30 July 1959	SP0863044176; 52°05′45″N 1°52′32″W	1081603	Upload Photo
Dovecote about 90m north-east of Bretforton Grange	Bretforton, Wychavon	Dovecote	15th century	30 July 1959	SP0871644224; 52°05′47″N 1°52′27″W	1081604	Upload Photo
41 Main Street	Bretforton, Wychavon	House	Late 17th century	3 July 1959	SP0903644009; 52°05′40″N 1°52′10″W	1081574	Upload Photo
Abbot's Grange	Broadway, Wychavon	House	14th century	29 July 1987	SP0937337457; 52°02′08″N 1°51′53″W	1214242	Abbot's Grange More images
Bannitts	Broadway, Wychavon	House	Early 17th century	30 July 1959	SP0940637388; 52°02′05″N 1°51′51″W	1288557	Upload Photo
Broad Close	Broadway, Wychavon	House	c. 1825	30 July 1959	SP0979737548; 52°02′11″N 1°51′31″W	1288489	Upload Photo
Court Farmhouse	Broadway, Wychavon	House	Early C20	30 July 1959	SP1059737523; 52°02′10″N 1°50′49″W	1288025	Court Farmhouse More images
Farnham House and Former Barn adjoining to North	Broadway, Wychavon	House	c. 1660	30 July 1959	SP0941637535; 52°02′10″N 1°51′51″W	1288559	Farnham House and Former Barn adjoining to North More images
Kite's Nest Farmhouse	Broadway, Wychavon	Farmhouse	Late 17th century	30 July 1959	SP1019235322; 52°00′58″N 1°51′10″W	1214235	Kite's Nest Farmhouse More images
Little Gables	Broadway, Wychavon	House	Mid 17th century	30 July 1959	SP0993937524; 52°02′10″N 1°51′23″W	1288139	Little Gables More images
Lygon Arms Hotel	Broadway, Wychavon	House	18th century	30 July 1959	SP0963137540; 52°02′10″N 1°51′40″W	1214639	Lygon Arms Hotel More images
Picton House	Broadway, Wychavon	House	c. 1700	30 July 1959	SP0973437552; 52°02′11″N 1°51′34″W	1214750	Upload Photo
Prior's Manse	Broadway, Wychavon	House	Early 14th century	30 July 1959	SP0994737556; 52°02′11″N 1°51′23″W	1214685	Prior's Manse More images
Russell House	Broadway, Wychavon	Studio House	1885-1912	30 July 1959	SP0922037645; 52°02′14″N 1°52′01″W	1287883	Russell House More images
The Court	Broadway, Wychavon	Coat of Arms	c. 1600	30 July 1959	SP0968236358; 52°01′32″N 1°51′37″W	1287965	The Court More images
Tudor House	Broadway, Wychavon	House	1659-60	30 July 1959	SP0987137523; 52°02′10″N 1°51′27″W	1288137	Tudor House More images
Atkinson House	Childswickham, Wychavon	House	14th century	30 July 1959	SP0751538691; 52°02′48″N 1°53′31″W	1215973	Atkinson House More images
Church of St Mary	Childswickham, Wychavon	Church	12th century	30 July 1959	SP0750838402; 52°02′38″N 1°53′31″W	1215972	Church of St Mary More images
Katie's House and Old Post Office	Childswickham, Wychavon	House	1959	30 July 1959	SP0730538786; 52°02′51″N 1°53′42″W	1287775	Upload Photo
23 New Street	Childswickham, Wychavon	House	15th century	30 July 1959	SP0742838744; 52°02′49″N 1°53′35″W	1287850	23 New Street More images
Church of All Saints	Church Lench, Wychavon	Parish Church	12th century	30 July 1959	SP0241451266; 52°09′35″N 1°57′58″W	1301843	Church of All Saints More images
Church of St Michael	Churchill, Wychavon	Church	14th century	11 February 1965	SO9228453543; 52°10′48″N 2°06′51″W	1319712	Church of St Michael More images
Church of St Andrew	Cleeve Prior, Wychavon	Church	C12-C14	30 July 1959	SP0878249324; 52°08′32″N 1°52′23″W	1081345	Church of St Andrew More images
Dovecot to Rear of Manor House	Cleeve Prior, Wychavon	Dovecote	Medieval	30 July 1959	SP0889049456; 52°08′36″N 1°52′17″W	1081310	Upload Photo
The Manor House	Cleeve Prior, Wychavon	House	16th century	30 July 1959	SP0885949417; 52°08′35″N 1°52′19″W	1081308	Upload Photo
Chapel attached to Cookhill Priory	Cookhill, Cookhill, Wychavon	Chapel	Early 15th century	30 July 1959	SP0536557288; 52°12′50″N 1°55′22″W	1096284	Upload Photo
Cookhill Priory	Cookhill, Cookhill, Wychavon	Farmhouse	15th century	30 July 1959	SP0536657274; 52°12′49″N 1°55′22″W	1096283	Upload Photo
Church of St John the Baptist	Crowle, Wychavon	Parish Church	12th century	4 September 1986	SO9217555889; 52°12′04″N 2°06′57″W	1081275	Church of St John the Baptist More images
Church of St James	Defford, Wychavon	Church	13th century	12 February 1965	SO9172643212; 52°05′14″N 2°07′20″W	1116858	Church of St James More images
Astwood Farmhouse	Dodderhill, Wychavon	Farmhouse	Late 16th century	15 June 1976	SO9423565590; 52°17′18″N 2°05′09″W	1215148	Upload Photo
Chateau Impney Hotel and Related Structure	Impney Park, Dodderhill, Wychavon	Country House	1869-75	26 June 1985	SO9106463969; 52°16′26″N 2°07′57″W	1288244	Chateau Impney Hotel and Related Structure More images
Dovecote at Moat Farm	Dormston, Wychavon	Timber Framed House	17th century	11 February 1965	SO9838457253; 52°12′49″N 2°01′30″W	1319738	Dovecote at Moat Farm More images
Moat Farmhouse	Dormston, Wychavon	Farmhouse	17th century	11 February 1965	SO9841857278; 52°12′49″N 2°01′28″W	1319800	Moat Farmhouse
Church of St Augustine	Hill End, Droitwich Spa, Wychavon	Parish Church	c. 1200	24 October 1951	SO9015063652; 52°16′15″N 2°08′45″W	1095965	Church of St Augustine More images
Nos. 31-35 (odd) High Street, Droitwich	Droitwich Spa, Wychavon	Open Hall House	c. 1400	20 September 1973	SO9002463377; 52°16′06″N 2°08′51″W	1296659	Upload Photo
Church of the Holy Trinity	Eckington, Wychavon	Church	12th century	11 February 1965	SO9221941410; 52°04′16″N 2°06′54″W	1116723	Church of the Holy Trinity More images
Woollas Hall	Eckington, Wychavon	Apartment	1955	5 July 1955	SO9474040558; 52°03′48″N 2°04′41″W	1116725	Woollas Hall More images
Brewhouse at Woollas Hall	Eckington, Wychavon	Brewhouse	1611	5 July 1955	SO9472440540; 52°03′48″N 2°04′42″W	1116684	Brewhouse at Woollas Hall
Church of St Mary	Elmbridge, Wychavon	Church	After 1877	14 March 1969	SO8992867871; 52°18′32″N 2°08′57″W	1215240	Church of St Mary More images
Church of St Michael	Elmley Lovett, Wychavon	Parish Church	14th century	14 March 1969	SO8655269673; 52°19′30″N 2°11′55″W	1215248	Church of St Michael More images
Church of St Andrew	Hampton, Evesham, Wychavon	Parish Church	C12-C15	7 May 1952	SP0286243102; 52°05′11″N 1°57′35″W	1156771	Church of St Andrew More images
Church of St Lawrence	Evesham, Wychavon	Church	14th century	7 May 1952	SP0368543675; 52°05′29″N 1°56′51″W	1081352	Church of St Lawrence More images
Dresden House	Evesham, Wychavon	House	1692	7 May 1952	SP0372043963; 52°05′38″N 1°56′50″W	1081377	Dresden House More images
Railings and Lamp Standards of 51, High St	Evesham, Wychavon	Railings		24 June 1977	SP0372943964; 52°05′38″N 1°56′49″W	1350076	Upload Photo
Remains of Abbey Stables	Evesham, Wychavon	Wall	14th century	7 May 1952	SP0359443627; 52°05′28″N 1°56′56″W	1350068	Upload Photo
The Cottage	Bengeworth, Evesham, Wychavon	Timber Framed House	17th century	7 May 1952	SP0414443352; 52°05′19″N 1°56′27″W	1156245	Upload Photo
The Old Vicarage (Church House)	Evesham, Wychavon	Vicarage	C15-C16	7 May 1952	SP0372243717; 52°05′30″N 1°56′50″W	1081350	The Old Vicarage (Church House) More images
Unitarian Chapel	Evesham, Wychavon	Unitarian Chapel	1737	7 May 1952	SP0384443946; 52°05′38″N 1°56′43″W	1302696	Unitarian Chapel
Walker Hall	Evesham, Wychavon	Library	16th century	7 May 1952	SP0370643722; 52°05′31″N 1°56′50″W	1081390	Walker Hall More images
32 and 34 Church Street	Bengeworth, Evesham, Wychavon	House	Early Medieval	24 June 1977	SP0431643489; 52°05′23″N 1°56′18″W	1156214	Upload Photo
45–49 High Street	Evesham, Wychavon	Shop	Modern	7 May 1952	SP0372143948; 52°05′38″N 1°56′50″W	1081376	Upload Photo
58 Bridge Street	Evesham, Wychavon	Courtyard	Medieval	7 May 1952	SP0386743697; 52°05′30″N 1°56′42″W	1095953	58 Bridge Street More images
Craycombe House	Fladbury, Wychavon	House	Late 18th century	11 February 1965	SP0003147395; 52°07′30″N 2°00′03″W	1039149	Upload Photo
Church of St John the Baptist	Grafton Flyford, Wychavon	Church	C13/C14	11 February 1965	SO9623855726; 52°11′59″N 2°03′23″W	1374136	Church of St John the Baptist More images
Church of St Michael	Great Comberton, Wychavon	Parish Church	12th century	11 February 1965	SO9549742084; 52°04′38″N 2°04′02″W	1242661	Church of St Michael More images
Old Astwood Farmhouse	Hanbury, Wychavon	Farmhouse	Late 16th century	5 June 1976	SO9338665079; 52°17′02″N 2°05′54″W	1081254	Upload Photo
The Long Gallery about 30m north-west of Hanbury Hall and attached Wall to South-east	Hanbury, Wychavon	Country House	c. 1701	14 March 1969	SO9435863757; 52°16′19″N 2°05′03″W	1081234	The Long Gallery about 30m north-west of Hanbury Hall and attached Wall to South-east More images
The Orangery and adjoining Walls about 120m west of Hanbury Hall	Hanbury, Wychavon	Wall	c. 1750	14 March 1969	SO9424463697; 52°16′17″N 2°05′09″W	1350127	The Orangery and adjoining Walls about 120m west of Hanbury Hall More images
Church of St James	Hartlebury, Wychavon	Parish Church	c. 1300	14 March 1969	SO8407470891; 52°20′09″N 2°14′07″W	1288150	Church of St James More images
St Gilbert's School, Waresley House	Waresley, Hartlebury, Wychavon	Country House	Late 18th century	14 March 1969	SO8448769879; 52°19′36″N 2°13′45″W	1215715	Upload Photo
The Rectory	Hartlebury, Hartlebury, Wychavon	Vicarage	After 1700	14 March 1969	SO8416171007; 52°20′13″N 2°14′02″W	1288066	Upload Photo
Shell Cottage	Shell, Himbleton, Wychavon	House	Mid C20	14 March 1969	SO9520059699; 52°14′08″N 2°04′18″W	1301732	Shell Cottage More images
Shell Manor	Shell, Himbleton, Wychavon	Farmhouse	Mid 15th century	29 December 1952	SO9505659823; 52°14′12″N 2°04′26″W	1081212	Shell Manor More images
Church of St James	Hindlip, Wychavon	Parish Church	15th century	14 March 1969	SO8802458587; 52°13′31″N 2°10′36″W	1081190	Church of St James More images
Cummins Farmhouse	Hindlip, Wychavon	Farmhouse	16th century	29 December 1952	SO8839258191; 52°13′18″N 2°10′17″W	1167748	Cummins Farmhouse
Hindlip Hall	Hindlip, Wychavon	Country House	Early 19th century	21 March 1985	SO8811658565; 52°13′31″N 2°10′31″W	1167757	Hindlip Hall More images
Church of St Peter	Hinton on the Green, Wychavon	Church	11th century	30 July 1959	SP0244040036; 52°03′31″N 1°57′57″W	1215987	Church of St Peter More images
Church of St Nicholas	Kemerton, Wychavon	Anglican Church	1846-50	30 July 1959	SO9458836806; 52°01′47″N 2°04′49″W	1296868	Church of St Nicholas More images
Kemerton Court (previously Lower Court)	Kemerton, Wychavon	House	17th century	30 July 1959	SO9450036676; 52°01′42″N 2°04′54″W	1349953	Kemerton Court (previously Lower Court) More images
Church of St James	Kington, Wychavon	Parish Church	13th century to 16th century	11 February 1965	SO9904155880; 52°12′04″N 2°00′56″W	1259905	Church of St James More images
Church of St Peter	Little Comberton, Wychavon	Parish Church	12th century	11 February 1965	SO9670642764; 52°05′00″N 2°02′58″W	1242787	Church of St Peter More images
Church of St Michael and All Angels	Martin Hussingtree, Wychavon	Parish Church	12th century	14 March 1969	SO8767859817; 52°14′11″N 2°10′55″W	1350147	Church of St Michael and All Angels More images
Martin Hall Farmhouse	Martin Hussingtree, Wychavon	Farmhouse	16th century	21 March 1985	SO8825160201; 52°14′24″N 2°10′25″W	1168013	Upload Photo
Church of St Bartholomew	Naunton Beauchamp, Wychavon	Church	Early English	11 February 1965	SO9623352441; 52°10′13″N 2°03′23″W	1259848	Church of St Bartholomew More images
Ruined Chapel at Chapel Farm	Netherton, Wychavon	Chapel	12th century	11 February 1965	SO9907241569; 52°04′21″N 2°00′54″W	1242825	Ruined Chapel at Chapel Farm More images
Church of St Nicholas	Middle Littleton, North and Middle Littleton, Wychavon	Parish Church	Medieval	30 July 1959	SP0805746990; 52°07′16″N 1°53′01″W	1303224	Church of St Nicholas More images
The Manor House	Middle Littleton, North and Middle Littleton, Wychavon	Manor House	Mid 17th century	30 July 1959	SP0797146995; 52°07′16″N 1°53′06″W	1303258	The Manor House
Bevere House	Bevere, North Claines, Wychavon	Apartment	Mid 18th century	14 March 1969	SO8412059340; 52°13′55″N 2°14′02″W	1081163	Upload Photo
Mill Hall	Porter's Mill, North Claines, Wychavon	House	Mid 19th century	25 December 1952	SO8611060402; 52°14′30″N 2°12′17″W	1296503	Upload Photo
Church of St Egwin	Norton and Lenchwick, Wychavon	Parish Church	14th century	30 July 1959	SP0419847759; 52°07′41″N 1°56′24″W	1166454	Church of St Egwin More images
Wood Norton Hall	Norton and Lenchwick, Wychavon	Country House	1897	7 December 1994	SP0169747089; 52°07′20″N 1°58′36″W	1111734	Upload Photo
Church of St James	Norton, Norton juxta Kempsey, Wychavon	Church	Norman	11 February 1965	SO8776451187; 52°09′32″N 2°10′49″W	1242858	Church of St James More images
Church of St James	Oddingley, Wychavon	Parish Church	15th century	14 March 1969	SO9144859050; 52°13′46″N 2°07′36″W	1081220	Church of St James More images
Church of St Mary and St Milburgh	Offenham, Wychavon	Parish Church	15th century	30 July 1959	SP0531446221; 52°06′51″N 1°55′26″W	1301324	Church of St Mary and St Milburgh More images
Court Farmhouse	Offenham, Wychavon	Farmhouse	Early 18th century	30 July 1959	SP0512046491; 52°07′00″N 1°55′36″W	1166516	Upload Photo
Church of St Andrew	Ombersley, Wychavon	Parish Church	1825-9	14 March 1969	SO8444263557; 52°16′12″N 2°13′46″W	1173479	Church of St Andrew More images
Dovecote about 20m west of Hawford Grange	Hawford, Ombersley, Wychavon	Dovecote	16th century	14 March 1969	SO8463760653; 52°14′38″N 2°13′35″W	1081151	Dovecote about 20m west of Hawford Grange More images
Sandys Mausoleum about 75m south-west of the Church of St Andrew	Ombersley, Wychavon	Parish Church	Late 13th century	29 December 1952	SO8441963483; 52°16′09″N 2°13′47″W	1173507	Sandys Mausoleum about 75m south-west of the Church of St Andrew More images
Stable Block about 100m north of Ombersley Court	Ombersley, Wychavon	Stable	c1812/1814	21 March 1985	SO8422463458; 52°16′09″N 2°13′57″W	1081174	Upload Photo
The Dower House	Ombersley, Wychavon	House	Mid 16th century	29 December 1952	SO8440463705; 52°16′17″N 2°13′48″W	1350202	The Dower House More images
Overbury Court	Overbury, Wychavon	Country House	c. 1739	30 July 1959	SO9566537486; 52°02′09″N 2°03′53″W	1167872	Overbury Court More images
Overbury and Conderton War Memorial Lych-gate	Overbury, Wychavon	War memorial	1921	2 December 1986	SO9569237390; 52°02′06″N 2°03′51″W	1349977	Overbury and Conderton War Memorial Lych-gate More images
Barn to North of Broad Marston Manor	Broad Marston, Pebworth, Wychavon	Barn	Late Medieval	27 January 1984	SP1405446336; 52°06′55″N 1°47′46″W	1350113	Upload Photo
The Priory	Broad Marston, Pebworth, Wychavon	House	Mid 17th century	30 July 1959	SP1418246304; 52°06′54″N 1°47′40″W	1303222	Upload Photo
Church of St Nicholas	Peopleton, Wychavon	Church	13th century	11 February 1965	SO9379250378; 52°09′06″N 2°05′32″W	1242862	Church of St Nicholas More images
Bedford House	Pershore, Wychavon	House	Earlier	11 February 1965	SO9503245699; 52°06′35″N 2°04′26″W	1386906	Bedford House More images
Former Church of St Andrew	Pershore, Wychavon	Parish Hall	1965	11 February 1965	SO9483245826; 52°06′39″N 2°04′37″W	1387033	Former Church of St Andrew More images
Pershore Bridge - North Bridge	Pershore, Wychavon	Bridge	Late 15th century	11 February 1965	SO9518645171; 52°06′17″N 2°04′18″W	1386992	Pershore Bridge - North Bridge More images
Pershore Bridge (that Part in Wick Civil Parish)	Pershore, Wychavon	Bridge	Late 15th century	11 February 1965	SO9523545134; 52°06′16″N 2°04′16″W	1386748	Pershore Bridge (that Part in Wick Civil Parish) More images
Pershore Bridge (that Part in Pershore Civil Parish)	Wick, Wychavon	Bridge	Late 15th century	11 February 1965	SO9525445119; 52°06′16″N 2°04′15″W	1386991	Pershore Bridge (that Part in Pershore Civil Parish) More images
Railings and Gate about 100m to rear of No 17 Bridge St (Perrot House)	Pershore, Wychavon	Gate	Mid-Late 18th century	11 February 1965	SO9514645689; 52°06′34″N 2°04′20″W	1386921	Upload Photo
Stanhope House	Pershore, Wychavon	House	1780	11 February 1965	SO9505945517; 52°06′29″N 2°04′25″W	1386969	Stanhope House More images
56 and 58 Bridge Street	Pershore, Wychavon	House	Late C18/Early 19th century	11 February 1965	SO9504845542; 52°06′29″N 2°04′25″W	1386967	56 and 58 Bridge Street More images
37 High Street	Pershore, Wychavon	House	Mid/Late 18th century	11 February 1965	SO9494345876; 52°06′40″N 2°04′31″W	1387076	37 High Street More images
Church of St Nicholas	Pinvin, Wychavon	Church	Early Norman	11 February 1965	SO9569548918; 52°08′19″N 2°03′52″W	1258256	Church of St Nicholas More images
Pirton Court	Pirton, Wychavon	House	Later	11 February 1965	SO8786846560; 52°07′02″N 2°10′43″W	1258298	Pirton Court More images
Rous Lench Court	Rous Lench, Wychavon	Country House	16th century	30 July 1959	SP0190552982; 52°10′30″N 1°58′25″W	1081656	Rous Lench Court More images
Parish Church of St Michael	Salwarpe, Wychavon	Parish Church	Early 12th century	14 March 1969	SO8746262072; 52°15′24″N 2°11′06″W	1081114	Parish Church of St Michael More images
Salwarpe Court	Salwarpe, Wychavon	House	c. 1580	29 December 1952	SO8755862089; 52°15′25″N 2°11′01″W	1350242	Salwarpe Court More images
Church House	Sedgeberrow, Wychavon	House	13th-century origins	30 July 1959	SP0201638310; 52°02′35″N 1°58′19″W	1168046	Upload Photo
Church of St Mary	Sedgeberrow, Wychavon	Parish Church	1328-31	30 July 1959	SP0245438514; 52°02′42″N 1°57′56″W	1168041	Church of St Mary More images
Church of St Michael	South Littleton, Wychavon	Church	13th century	30 July 1959	SP0757246237; 52°06′52″N 1°53′27″W	1081303	Church of St Michael More images
The Manor House	South Littleton, Wychavon	House	c1685-1720	30 July 1959	SP0764646209; 52°06′51″N 1°53′23″W	1081265	The Manor House More images
Church of All Saints	Spetchley, Wychavon	Parish Church	14th century	11 February 1965	SO8956553946; 52°11′01″N 2°09′15″W	1258265	Church of All Saints More images
Spetchley Hall (including Roman Catholic Chapel)	Spetchley, Wychavon	Country House	1811	11 February 1965	SO8954553863; 52°10′58″N 2°09′16″W	1273492	Spetchley Hall (including Roman Catholic Chapel) More images
Church of St Edmund, King and Martyr	Stoulton, Wychavon	Church	12th century	11 February 1965	SO9063249808; 52°08′47″N 2°08′18″W	1258689	Church of St Edmund, King and Martyr More images
Lower Wolverton Hall	Wolverton, Stoulton, Wychavon	Country House	Early 18th century	11 February 1965	SO9299250676; 52°09′16″N 2°06′14″W	1273302	Lower Wolverton Hall More images
Court Farmhouse	Throckmorton, Wychavon	Farmhouse	Early 16th century	11 February 1965	SO9828449513; 52°08′38″N 2°01′35″W	1273256	Upload Photo
Parish Church	Throckmorton, Wychavon	Parish Church	13th century	11 February 1965	SO9812449841; 52°08′49″N 2°01′44″W	1258642	Parish Church More images
Rectory Farmhouse	Tibberton, Wychavon	Farmhouse	Early 17th century	29 December 1952	SO9028456940; 52°12′38″N 2°08′37″W	1081184	Rectory Farmhouse More images
Church of St Kenelm	Upton Snodsbury, Wychavon	Church	Early English	11 February 1965	SO9431154380; 52°11′15″N 2°05′05″W	1258793	Church of St Kenelm More images
Church of St Michael	Upton Warren, Wychavon	Parish Church	Late 13th century	14 March 1969	SO9306767470; 52°18′19″N 2°06′11″W	1287929	Church of St Michael More images
Church of St John the Baptist	White Ladies Aston, Wychavon	Parish Church	12th century	11 February 1965	SO9220952703; 52°10′21″N 2°06′55″W	1258836	Church of St John the Baptist More images
Church of St Mary	Wick, Wychavon	Parish Church	C12-C16	11 February 1965	SO9626145280; 52°06′21″N 2°03′22″W	1258672	Church of St Mary More images
Church of St Anne	Wyre Piddle, Wychavon	Parish Church	12th century	11 February 1965	SO9618847285; 52°07′26″N 2°03′26″W	1273334	Church of St Anne More images
