= Rowland Berkeley (died 1696) =

English politician (1613-1696)

Rowland Berkeley (1613–1696) of Cotheridge Worcestershire, was an English politician, only son of William Berkeley (1582–1658) of Cotheridge and his wife Margaret, daughter of Thomas Chettle of Worcester. Rowland's father, William, was eldest son and heir to Rowland Berkeley of Spetchley, Worcester clothier and politician.

He was knighted by Charles I at Whitehall 30 June 1641.

== Royalist ==
Sir Rowland was one of the Commissioners of Array appointed to call out the Militia in June 1642. The muster rolls were kept at Cotheridge. He was appointed High Sheriff of Worcestershire for 1644–45.

He seems to have taken over Cotheridge long before his father died in 1658. Immediately after the Siege of Worcester on 23 July 1646 he had obtained a written pass of safety to his home, Cotheridge, on taking an oath to not again bear arms against Parliament.

He was obliged to pay a fine of £2,030 on 25 August 1646 having been charged that "his house being within three miles of Worcester, he continued to live there while it was held for the king, and was placed on a Commission for the safeguarding of the County, and for raising contributions for the king's forces."

He left a written description of the fight of the evening of 3 September 1651 having, he says, been brought from Cotheridge to Worcester against his will as he had "resolved not to meddle". He wrote to Sir Thomas Cave, his father-in-law, that he was fetched to King Charles by a major with a party of horse. While waiting for audience with the king he learnt a commission had been issued to him and other gentlemen of the county to assist Major-General Massie, Worcester's (Royalist) governor. Berkeley escaped, took horse and fled home while the battle already raged. He was caught once by the Scots (the King's men) but managed to leave them.

Early the next morning a party of Parliament horse arrived at Cotheridge and brought him and his dun colt as far as St John's Worcester where they found they held no order for what they were doing and he was allowed to return home.

Nash, the source of the next tale, was Sir Rowland's great-grandson.

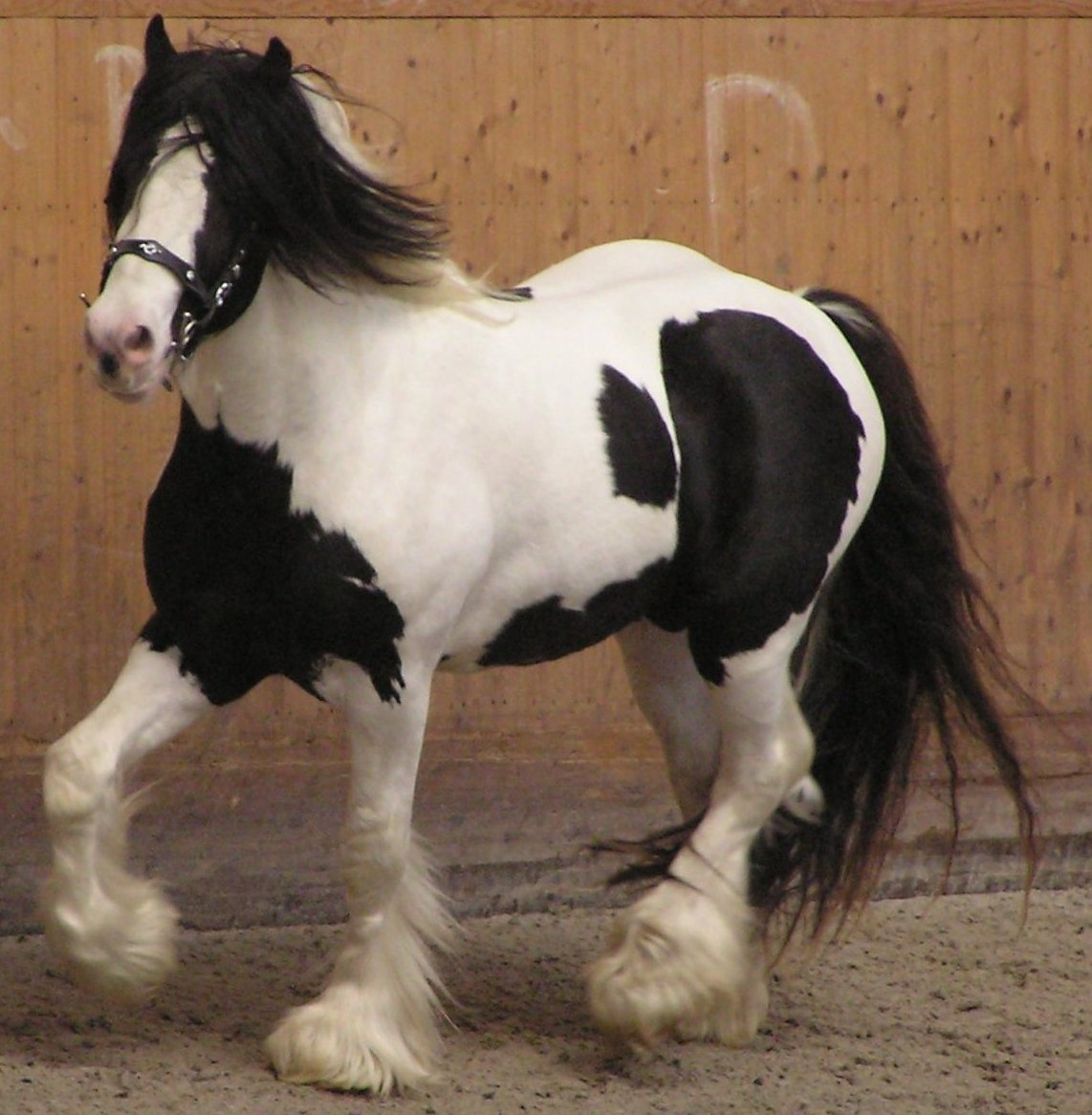
Piebald charger

Nash, in the supplement to his history, mentions that "Sir Rowland Berkeley of the Middle Temple, M.P. for the city of Worcester, and a cavalier officer, happened to have two piebald horses exactly alike, and one of them he rode at the battle of Worcester. When the battle was lost Sir Rowland escaped to Cotheridge as best he might, and leaving his exhausted charger at one of his farmhouses, went straightway to bed. It was not long, as he had foreseen, that a troop of Cromwell's army made their appearance at the Court, and demanded to see Sir Rowland. They were told he was ill in bed, but this did not prevent their rushing into his room.

"So you were fighting against us at Worcester to-day, were you ?" asked the crop-heads.
"I!" says Mr. Berkeley, faintly and innocently. "Why I am sick and forced to keep my bed!"
"All very fine," said they, "but you were there, and very conspicuous, riding a piebald charger."
"It could not have been I," says the sick man, "for though I certainly do ride a piebald charger when I am in health, yet he has never been out of the stable all day. If you doubt my word you had better go to the stable and satisfy yourselves."

"Thereupon the roundheads go and find piebald No. 2 as fresh as a daisy, and evidently not from Worcester. So they conclude that they had mistaken their man, and leave the sick Mr. Berkeley to get well and laugh at the ruse he had so successfully played upon them."

— John Noake, Noake's Guide to Worcestershire, 1868 Longman & Co, London

Sir Rowland was one of the gentlemen chosen by King Charles in 1660 to be invested with the order of the Royal Oak, an order which was not instituted.

== House of Commons ==
Sir Rowland Berkeley served as MP for Worcester from 1661 to 1679.

== Patronage network ==
Rowland Berkeley married Dorothy, daughter of Sir Thomas Cave of Stamford and his wife Elizabeth sister of Herbert Croft Bishop of Hereford and dean of the chapels royal to Charles II. Dorothy's brother Thomas was raised to a baronetcy by Charles I the same day as Rowland Berkeley was knighted.

His uncle Robert Berkeley was also MP for Worcester 1621-1624

== Children ==
- Thomas died unmarried in Greece aged 30 while on a diplomatic mission
- Elizabeth married Henry Greene of Wykin Warwickshire and their eldest son became Rowland Berkeley of Cotheridge
- Penelope married Sir Thomas Street (1625-1696) a justice of the court of common pleas MP for Worcester 1658-1680
- Rebecca married Henry Townsend
- Mary married Richard Nash and was grandmother to Treadway Nash
- Margaret married William Bromley (of Holt Castle) (1656–1707), Whig Member of Parliament and was grandmother to Henry Bromley, 1st Baron Montfort.

Parliament of England
Preceded by Thomas Street; Thomas Hall	Member of Parliament for Worcester; 1661–1679; With: Thomas Street	Succeeded by Henry Herbert; Sir Francis Winnington
