= Robert Berkeley (writer) =

English political writer

Robert Berkeley (1713–1804) was an English political writer, who is assumed also to be a significant activist for Catholic emancipation of the 1770s.

== Life ==
He was the son of Thomas Berkeley of Spetchley, Worcestershire, and his wife Mary, daughter and heiress of Robert Davis, of Clytha, Monmouthshire; the father was great-grandson of Sir Robert Berkeley, the 17th-century judge. He was presumed to have been behind the petition to George III, by Catholic nobility and gentry, presented in 1778. A consequence was the Papists Act 1778.

Thomas Phillips (1708–1774), biographer of Cardinal Pole, lived with Berkeley as his Catholic chaplain, from 1763 to 1765. Another chaplain at Spetchley was Thomas Falkner (around 1769 to 1771). Berkeley employed William Combe to edit Falkner's Description of Patagonia, in 1773.

== Works ==
Berkeley published Considerations on the Oath of Supremacy, and Considerations on the Declaration against Transubstantiation, both addressed to Josiah Tucker, the Dean of Gloucester. These works were based on their conversations, and led to a correspondence between them. It is thought that Berkeley was also the author of several other works. Reasons for the Repeal of the Laws against the Papists, published by Berkeley, was attributed by Augustin de Backer to Thomas Phillips his chaplain.

== Family ==
Berkeley married first Anne, co-heir of John Wyborne or Wybarne of Flixton, Norfolk. This marriage brought him manors in Essex, which were owned jointly with Anne's sister Catherine, married to Philip Jones of Llanarth Court. By an act of parliament of 1777 these manors were allowed to be put up for sale; which happened in 1788.

Secondly, Berkeley married Catharine, daughter of Thomas Fitzherbert, of Swynnerton, Staffordshire; and thirdly, Elizabeth, daughter of Peter Parry, of Twysog, in Denbighshire. Dying without issue on 20 December 1804, he was succeeded in the family estates by his nephew, Robert Berkeley (1764–1845). He had made additions to the house, including a dining room, but it was his successor who rebuilt Spetchley Park completely, in 1811.

== Notes ==
Attribution

This article incorporates text from a publication now in the public domain: Stephen, Leslie, ed. (1885). "Berkeley, Robert (1713-1804)". Dictionary of National Biography. Vol. 4. London: Smith, Elder & Co.
