= Rowland Berkeley (died 1611) =

English clothier and politician

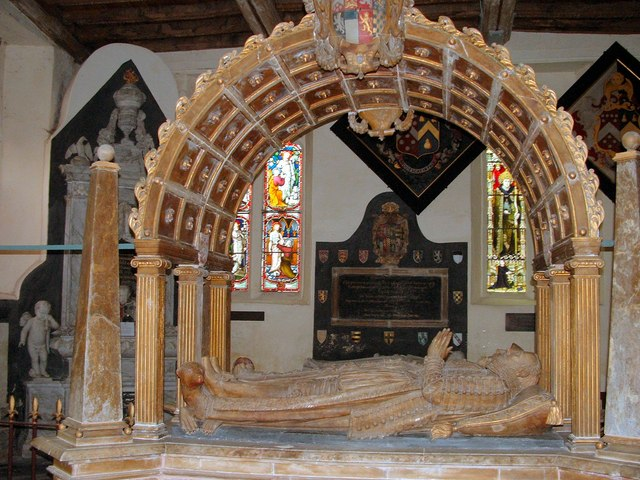
Monument of Sir Rowland Berkeley and his wife Katherine Heywood All Saints Church, Spetchley

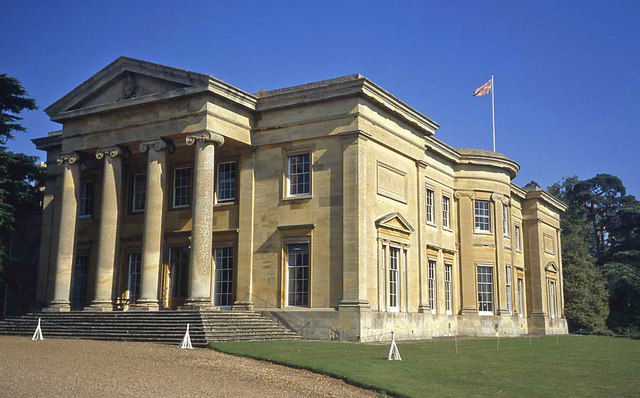
Spetchley Park built 1811.

Rowland Berkeley (about 1548 – 1 June 1611) of Worcester and Spetchley was an English clothier and politician who sat in the House of Commons at various times between 1593 and 1611.

Berkeley was the eighth son of William Berkeley, mayor and MP for Hereford, great-nephew of William, 1st Marquess of Berkeley.

== Worcester and Spetchley ==
Rowland Berkeley became a successful clothier at Worcester. He bought Spetchley Park from Philip Sheldon. He was bailiff of Worcester in 1585 and 1587. He was appointed first master of the Clothers Company of Worcester under the Clothers Charter of 23 September 1590. After his death his eldest son acquired extensive property in Cotheridge.

== House of Commons ==
In 1593, he was elected Member of Parliament for Worcester. He was re-elected MP for Worcester in 1597 and 1601. In 1605 he was elected MP for Worcester again in a by-election and sat until his death in 1611.

== Family ==
Berkeley married 15 April 1574 Catherine Hayward, daughter of Thomas Hayward. Their children included:

- William Berkeley (1582–1658) of Cotheridge
- Robert Berkeley (1584–1656) of Spetchley
- Dorothy, eldest daughter, who married in 1593 Thomas Wylde (1558–1610, grandson of Thomas Wylde) of The Commandery and was mother of Margaret, who married Samuel Fell
- Joan, sixth daughter, who married firstly Henry Bright and secondly Edward Annesley

Parliament of England
Preceded by John Walsgrove alias Fleet; Walter Jones	Member of Parliament for Worcester; 1593–1601; With: Walter Jones 1593; William Bagnall 1597; Christopher Deighton 1601	Succeeded by John Coucher; Christopher Deighton
Preceded by John Coucher; Christopher Deighton	Member of Parliament for Worcester; 1605–1611; With: John Coucher	Succeeded by John Coucher; Thomas Chettle
