= Pershore Town Hall =

Municipal building in Pershore, Worcestershire, England

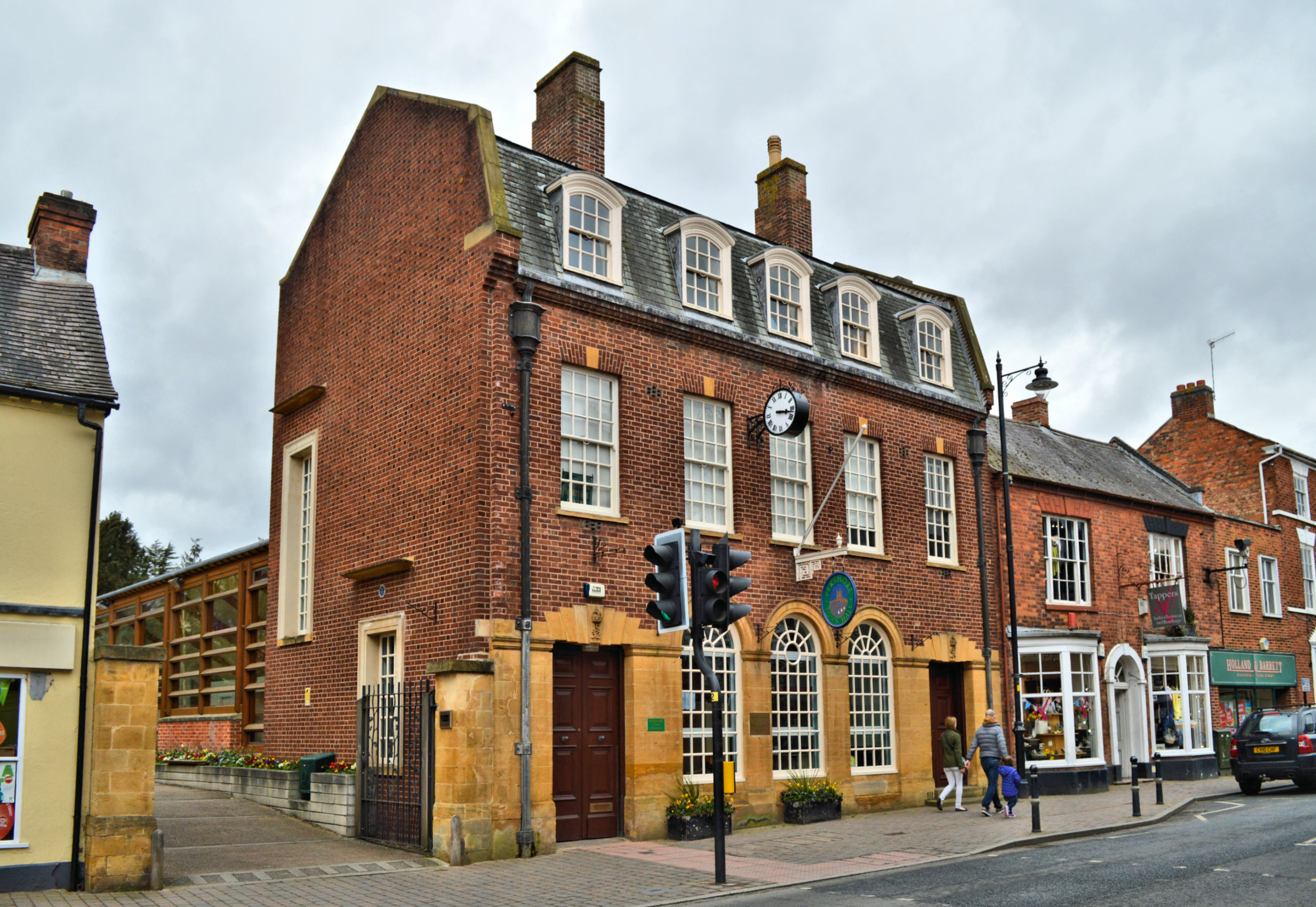
- The building in 2016

- Shown in Worcestershire
- 52.1111°N 2.0756°W
- Location: High Street, Pershore

History
- Built: 1932

Site notes
- Architect: Henry Seccombe
- Architectural style: Neoclassical style

Pershore Town Hall is a municipal building in the High Street in Pershore, a town in Worcestershire, in England. Originally commissioned as a post office, it is now the headquarters of Pershore Town Council.

== History ==
A sanitary district was established in the Pershore area in 1875. In 1894, it was succeeded by Pershore Rural District Council, which initially met in the boardroom at the local workhouse in Station Road. In the mid-1930s, the council decided to acquire a three-storey private house, No. 37 High Street, for use as its offices. Following local government reorganisation in 1974, it became the local offices of Wychavon District Council and continued in that use, until the council moved to Pershore Civic Centre in 1991. It was subsequently converted for commercial use and is now occupied by a firm of solicitors, Thomson & Bancks.

The current town hall was originally commissioned as a post office, replacing an earlier post office on the same site, and was erected facing the old council offices. It was designed by Henry Seccombe in the neoclassical style, built in red brick with stone finishings and was completed in 1932. The design involved a symmetrical main frontage of five bays facing onto the High Street. The end bays featured doorways with stone surrounds, voussoirs and keystones. The central three bays on the ground floor were fenestrated by round headed windows with architraves and keystones, while all the bays on the first floor were fenestrated by sash windows, and all the bays at attic level were fenestrated by dormer windows. A projecting clock, intended to commemorate the lives of local service personnel who died in the Second World War, was installed above the central window on the ground floor in October 1953. It was replaced as part of celebrations for the Silver Jubilee of Elizabeth II in 1977.

In 1973, the post office was recategorised as a sub-post office, and in the late 1990s, it moved into the town's Tesco supermarket. The old post office was subsequently purchased by Pershore Town Council, which financed the purchase through the disposal of its old offices at St Agatha's Hall in Head Street. (Note: The old mission hall, also known as St Agatha's Hall, in Head Street, dated from 1895. Pershore Town Council acquired it from Wychavon District Council for use as its offices in 1991.)

The council conducted alterations to the old post office and reopened it as the town hall in 2002. A council chamber and a small council members' room, were established on the ground floor. The Pershore Heritage Centre, which opened in 1995, moved to the first floor of the building in 2003. Its collection includes a series of folders documenting the events of the Second World War in the Vale, the acquisition of which were funded by the National Lottery Heritage Fund.

A memorial garden, intended to commemorate the lives of people who died during the COVID-19 pandemic, was established in the walkway to the south of the town hall in March 2021.
