= William Combs =

William Combs may refer to:

- William E. Combs of the Combs Method
- Bill Combs, wrestler

== See also ==
- William Combe (disambiguation)
- William Coombs (disambiguation)
