= William Combe (disambiguation) =

William Combe (1742–1823) was a British writer.

William Combe may also refer to:

- William Combe (15th century MP), MP for Chichester
- William Combe (died 1610) (1551–1610), MP for Droitwich, Warwick and Warwickshire
- William Combe (died 1667) (1586–1667), MP for Warwickshire

== See also ==
- William Combs (disambiguation)
