= Thomas Falkner =

English missionary and explorer (1707–1784)

Thomas Falkner (6 October 1707 – 30 January 1784) was an English Jesuit missionary, explorer and physician, active in the Patagonia region for nearly forty years. His primary work, The Description of Patagonia, was written towards the idea of English colonization (similar to Mungo Park and other explorers of his era), but it remains valuable as a record of early life, flora and fauna of the region. He is credited with recording the first fossil in present-day Argentina. Falkner also contributed to the description of the Mapudungun language.

== Life ==
He was the son of Thomas Falkner, a Manchester apothecary, and had Calvinist, maybe Scottish heritage.

In poor health, he was advised to take a sea-voyage, and being acquainted with a ship chaplain on board the Assiento, a vessel trading with Guinea and carrying slaves to Buenos Aires, he accepted an invitation to accompany the vessel as surgeon. This was in or about 1731. On reaching Buenos Aires he was so ill that the captain was compelled to leave him there in the care of Father Mahoney, the superior of the Jesuit College, where he was nursed back to health. He then converted to Catholicism, joined the Jesuits and became a priest.

In 1740 or soon after he was sent to assist Father Matthias Strobel in his mission to the northern Tehuelche people at Laguna de los Padres, 12 miles (19 km) west of the present day city of Mar del Plata, the first permanent human settlement in the region. For about the next forty years he was a missionary and explorer in the region, gathering material that would become The Description of Patagonia.

Falkner returned to England, where, in 1771 or 1772, he joined the English province of the Society. He was appointed chaplain to Robert Berkeley of Spetchley. He then became chaplain to Mr. Berington of Winsley in Herefordshire, and afterwards to the Plowdens of Plowden Hall in Shropshire.

Falkner died at Plowden in January 1784 aged 76.

== Scientific discoveries ==
He is credited with recording the first fossil in present-day Argentina: In 1760 Falkner discovered the skeleton of a big armadillo on the banks of Carcarañá River, near the village of Santa Fe; many years later the fossil was identified as originating from a glyptodon. Darwin mentions this fossil and "old Falkner" in his Beagle voyage, after he also discovered fossils in Patagonia.

== Works ==
He wrote an account of his Patagonian experiences, which was published at Hereford in 1774 under the title A Description of Patagonia and the adjoining parts of South America, with a grammar and a short vocabulary, and some particulars relating to Falkland's Islands. The book as published was not his original work, but a compilation by William Combe, who used Falkner's papers. The book was translated into German, French, and Spanish. Another account of the Patagonians due to Father Falkner is found in the works of Thomas Pennant, who described his essay as "formed from the relation of Fr. Falkner, a Jesuit, who had resided among them thirty-eight years".

Title page, A Description of Patagonia

After his death, the Spanish Jesuits who had known him in South America were anxious to obtain his unpublished works. They included treatises on the botanical and mineral products of America, and American distempers as cured by American drugs. It is stated by Fr. Caballero, S.J., that he had also edited Volumina duo de anatomia corporis humani.

=== Linguistic description ===
Falkner's book contains significant description of the languages of the Southern Cone, including especially the language of the Moluche, a dialect of Mapudungun. Jooken suggests that Falkner's analysis of the language was unusually observant for the time, and not exclusively based on grammatical categories from the grammar of Latin.

== Legacy ==
Lake Falkner in Argentina is named after him, as well as a street in the city of Mar del Plata.

== Bibliography ==
- Stephen, Leslie, ed. (1889). "Falkner, Thomas" . Dictionary of National Biography. Vol. 18. London: Smith, Elder & Co.
- Herbermann, Charles, ed. (1913). "Thomas Falkner" . Catholic Encyclopedia. New York: Robert Appleton Company.
- Wilson, J. G.; Fiske, J., eds. (1900). "Falkner, Thomas" . Appletons' Cyclopædia of American Biography. New York: D. Appleton.
