= St Leonard's Church =

St Leonard's Church or similar names may refer to:

== Belgium ==
- St. Leonard's Church, Zoutleeuw

== Germany ==
- St. Leonhard, Frankfurt

== Malta ==
- St Leonard's Church, Kirkop

== Poland ==
- St. Leonard's Church, Lipnica Murowana

== Slovenia ==
- St. Leonard's Church (Jesenice)

== United Kingdom ==
=== England ===
==== Bedfordshire ====
- Church of St Leonard, Old Warden
- Church of St Leonard, Stagsden
- Church of St Leonard, Thorpe Malsor

==== Cheshire ====
- St Leonard's Church, Warmingham

==== Derbyshire ====
- St Leonard's Church, Scarcliffe
- St Leonard's Church, Shirland

==== East Sussex ====
- St Leonard's Church, Aldrington, Brighton and Hove
- St Leonard's Church, St Leonards-on-Sea
- St Leonard's Baptist Church, St Leonards-on-Sea
- St Leonard's Church, the official name of the Church in the Wood, Hollington

==== Essex ====
- Church of St Leonard at the Hythe, Colchester
- St Leonard's Church, Lexden, Colchester

==== Gloucestershire ====
- Church of St Leonard, Bledington
- Church of St Leonard, Lower Lemington
- Church of St Leonard, Stowell Park

==== Greater Manchester ====
- St Leonard's Church, Middleton, Greater Manchester

==== Hampshire ====
- St Leonard's Church, Hartley Mauditt

==== Hertfordshire ====
- St Leonard's Church, Bengeo
- St Leonard's Church, Sandridge

==== Kent ====
- St Leonard's Church Hythe, Kent

==== Lancashire ====
- St Leonard's Church, Balderstone
- St Leonard's Church, Downham
- New St Leonard's Church, Langho
- Old St Leonard's Church, Langho
- Church of St Leonard the Less, Samlesbury
- St Leonard's Church, Walton-le-Dale

==== Leicestershire ====
- St Leonard's Church, Sysonby

==== Lincolnshire ====
- St Leonard's Without, Kirkstead

==== London ====
- St Leonard, Eastcheap, City of London
- St Leonard, Foster Lane, City of London
- St Leonard's Church, Heston, Hounslow
- St. Leonard's, Shoreditch, Hackney
- St Leonard's Church, Streatham, Lambeth

==== Nottinghamshire ====
- St Leonard's Church, Wollaton
- St Leonard's Church, Newark

==== Northamptonshire ====
- St Leonard's Church, Apethorpe

==== Shropshire ====
- St Leonard's Church, Bridgnorth
- St Leonard's Church, Linley
- White Ladies Priory, now ruined, originally dedicated to St Leonard

==== Somerset ====
- Church of St Leonard, Butleigh
- Church of St Leonard, Chelwood
- Church of St Leonard, Farleigh Hungerford
- St Leonard's Church, Marston Bigot
- Church of St Leonard, Otterford
- Church of St Leonard, Rodney Stoke

==== Warwickshire ====
- St Leonard's Church, Spernall

==== Wiltshire ====
- St Leonard's Church, Berwick St Leonard
- St Leonard's Church, Sutton Veny

==== Worcestershire ====
- St Leonard's Church, Cotheridge
- St Leonard's Church, Frankley

=== Scotland ===
- St Leonard's Church, Dunfermline
- St Leonard's Church, Perth
- St Leonard's-in-the-Fields Church, Perth

== United States ==
- St. Leonard's Church (Boston), Massachusetts
- Saint Leonard Catholic Church (Madison, Nebraska)
- St. Leonard's Anglican Church, Brooklyn, New York

== See also ==
- St. Leo's Church (disambiguation)
- St. Leonard and St. Mary's Church (disambiguation)
