= Thomas Phillips (priest) =

Thomas Phillips (5 July 1708, Ickford, Buckinghamshire – 16 June 1774, Liège) was an English Jesuit priest, known as the biographer of Reginald Cardinal Pole.

== Life ==
Phillips was the great-nephew of William Joyner, a prominent Catholic convert, whose sister, Mary, married an attorney, Thomas Phillips; the couple had a daughter, and a son, Thomas, who converted to Roman Catholicism. He, in turn, married Elizabeth Crosse, daughter of Johnshall Crosse of Bledlow, and they had nine children (eight sons and one daughter), including Thomas Phillips, the Jesuit priest and biographer.

Phillips's early schooling was Protestant, after which he was sent to the College of St Omer. When he had completed his course of rhetoric he entered the novitiate of the Society of Jesus at Watten on 7 September 1726, and made the simple vows of the Society on 8 September 1728. He was then moved to the English College, Liège for his three-year course of philosophy.

Soon after Phillip's admission to holy orders his father died, leaving him independently wealthy. He travelled through the Netherlands, Germany, France, and Italy, visiting universities, and forming friendships. During the third year of his philosophical course, on 17 July 1731, he made a voluntary renunciation of his property to the college at Liège and the provincial, the Rev John Turberville. In the second year of his course of theology he sought permission to conduct a course of humanities at St Omer, against the requirement of the Society to accept assignments, and he was turned down. On 4 July 1733 he withdrew from the Society.

Phillips then went to Rome, where Henry Sheldon, rector of the English College, Rome, introduced him to Charles Edward Stuart, who found for him an appointment as a canon at Tongres (1 September 1739), with a dispensation to serve on the English mission. Returning to England, he officiated as chaplain to George Talbot, 14th Earl of Shrewsbury, at Heythrop Park from 1739 to 1753. He then served as chaplain to Sir Richard Acton, 5th Baronet at Aldenham Park, Shropshire; and subsequently (1763–65) to Robert Berkeley of Spetchley Park, Worcestershire. Eventually he returned to Liège, where he was readmitted to the Society of Jesus on 16 June 1768. He died there in July 1774.

== Works ==
Phillips's major work was The History of the Life of Cardinal Pole (1764). His object in it was to give an account of the Council of Trent from a Roman Catholic point of view.

There were many Protestant replies. Thomas Secker, at that time Archbishop of Canterbury, saw it as an attack on the Protestant Reformation; and Gloucester Ridley wrote a Review (1766) reflecting Secker's opinion.

Other responses came from Timothy Neve, John Jortin, Edward Stone and Richard Tillard. William Cole's unpublished Observations on answers to Phillips's book, and correspondence with the author, went to the British Museum. Phillips himself appended An Answer to the principal Objections to his Study of Sacred Literature (1765). He responded to the 1766 Animadversions by Neve, who had defended the characters of Protestant reformers, in later editions of the History.

The biography stayed near to its sources, particularly Angelo Maria Quirini, but also Ludovico Beccadelli and Andreas Dudith. Critics have considered that Phillips rearranged Quirini, coming close to plagiarism.

Other works were:

- To the Right Reverend and Religious Dame Elizabeth Phillips on her entering the Religious Order of St. Benet, in the Convent of English Dames of the same Order at Gant, privately printed, sine loco [1748?], and addressed to his sister. Reprinted in the European Magazine, September 1796, and in the Catholic Magazine and Review, Birmingham, March 1833.
- A Letter to a Student at a Foreign University on the Study of Divinity, by "T. P. s. c. t." (i.e. senior canon of Tongres), London, 1756; 2nd edit. 1758; 3rd edit., London, 1765. The third edition is entitled The Study of Sacred Literature fully stated and considered, in a Discourse to a Student in Divinity.
- Philemon, privately printed, sine loco, 1761—a pamphlet suppressed by the author containing incidents in his early life.
- Censura Commentariorum Cornelii à Lapide, in Latin, on a single sheet.
- A metrical translation of the Lauda Sion Salvatorem, beginning "Sion, rejoice in tuneful lays."

Augustin de Backer attributed to him Reasons for the Repeal of the Laws against the Papists, by Robert Berkeley of Spetchley.

== Notes ==
Attribution

This article incorporates text from a publication now in the public domain: Lee, Sidney, ed. (1896). "Phillips, Thomas (1708-1774)". Dictionary of National Biography. Vol. 45. London: Smith, Elder & Co.
