= Herbert Bowyer Berkeley =

English photographer and chemical engineer

Herbert Bowyer Berkeley (27 March 1851 – 26 May 1890) was an English photographer as well as a chemical engineer. He was the fourth son of The Reverend William Comyns Berkeley and Harriet Elizabeth Bowyer Nichols Berkeley. Berkeley was educated at Uppingham School, was a member of the Royal Photographic Society and exhibited work from 1874 until 1889.

== Early life ==
Herbert Bowyer Berkeley was born on 27 March 1851 at Cotheridge Court, Cotheridge, Worcestershire, England. During his years at Uppingham he was introduced to chemistry by his science teacher, a German PhD. After Uppingham he lived at Cotheridge Court. During the 1870s he became an amateur photographer as well as a chemical engineer, and experimented with the developing processes and photographic materials available to him during that time. Many of his early photographs were scenes taken around the extensive woods and pastures in the vicinity of his family home. By early 1881 he had left Cotheridge and was living in lodgings in London.

== Experiments ==
During the 1870s photographers used the common wet-plate, which required a lot of on-the-spot preparation for immediate exposure. Although not a new idea, photography was still in its early stages of experimentation. Berkeley experimented with the pre-coated, semi-dry collodion plates which were commercially available at that time. He discovered that with the addition of sulfite to Samman's developing solution, to absorb the sulphur dioxide, which was given off by the chemical dithionite, that dithionite was no longer required in the developing process. Berkeley published his discovery in 1881.

== Chemical engineer ==
In 1882 the British Journal of Photography Almanac included his new formula of pyrogallol, sulfite and citric acid in their publication. In Berkeley's new formula, just before use, ammonia was added to make it more alkaline.

In London, Berkeley was a member of the Platinotype Company where he worked in association with William Willis. The company marketed Berkeley's Sulpho-pyrogallol Developer.

== Photographic career ==
Berkeley displayed his landscape photographic works in exhibitions of the Royal Photographic Society between the years 1874 and 1889. In 1886, he was awarded a medal for a scene taken in the Dove Valley, Staffordshire, England.

== Early death ==
Berkeley's health was beginning to fail and in 1889 he left England and travelled to Algiers, probably with the hope that a drier climate would be of benefit to him. He died in Algiers at age 39, unmarried. A plaque in memoriam to him hangs inside St. Leonard's church, Cotheridge, located a short distance from his family home. Herbert Bowyer Berkeley was not fully recognised for his important discovery and contribution to the developing process.
