= Chettle (surname) =

Chettle is a surname. Notable people with the surname include:

- Callum Chettle (born 1996), English footballer
- David Chettle (born 1951), Australian long-distance runner
- Henry Chettle (c.1564–c.1606), English dramatist
- Steve Chettle (born 1968), English footballer
- Thomas Chettle (died c.1640), English politician
