= John Coucher =

John Coucher (born 1561) was an English merchant and politician who sat in the House of Commons variously between 1604 and 1648.

Coucher was the son of John Coucher of Worcester. He was a citizen and weaver and was appointed first of the first assistants of the Clothier's Company on 23 September 1590. He was bailiff of Worcester in 1593 and 1595.

In 1604 Coucher was elected Member of Parliament for Worcester. He was re-elected MP for Worcester in 1614, 1621 and 1624. He was an alderman of Worcester in 1621. In 1628 he was re-elected again for Worcester and sat until 1629 when King Charles decided to rule without parliament for eleven years. Coucher was fined £10 on 4 March 1631 for not taking a knighthood at the coronation.

At the age of 79, Coucher was re-elected MP for Worcester for the Short Parliament in April 1640 and again for the Long Parliament in November 1640. He tried hard to get out of the election but could not. He probably never took his seat in the Long Parliament because of his age, and was constantly excused his attendance. He was still living in 1648.

Parliament of England
Preceded by Rowland Berkeley; Christopher Deighton	Member of Parliament for Worcester; 1604–1624; With: Christopher Deighton 1604; Rowland Berkeley 1605; Thomas Chettle 1614; Robert Berkeley 1621–1624	Succeeded by Walter Devereux; Henry Spelman
Preceded by John Spelman; John Haselock	Member of Parliament for Worcester; 1628–1629; With: John Haselock	Parliament suspended until 1640
Vacant Parliament suspended since 1629	Member of Parliament for Worcester; 1640–1648; With: John Nash	Not represented in Barebones Parliament
