= William Coombs =

William Coombs may refer to:

- William H. Coombs (1808–1894), Justice of the Indiana Supreme Court
- William J. Coombs (1833–1922), member of the United States House of Representatives from New York
- William Coombs (paleontologist), established the genus Dyslocosaurus
- W. H. Coombs (1816–1896), Anglican minister in Gawler, South Australia

== See also ==
- William Combs (disambiguation)
