= St Leonard's Church, Cotheridge =

St. Leonard's Church
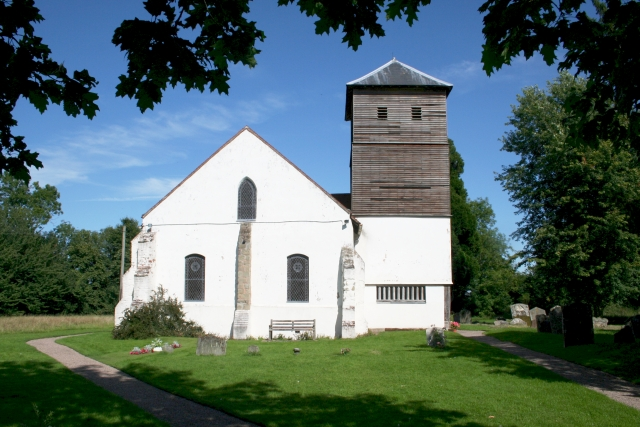
- St. Leonard's Church, Cotheridge
- St. Leonard's Church
- 52.19048°N 2.31347°W
- Location: Cotheridge, Worcestershire
- Country: England
- Denomination: Church of England

History
- Status: Church

Architecture
- Functional status: Active
- Years built: 12th century

Administration
- Diocese: Worcester

St. Leonard's Church is a small, 12th-century church located in the scattered village of Cotheridge in Worcestershire. It stands not far from the manor house, Cotheridge Court. The church boasts an ancient, wooden tower. The main part of the church, the nave, has a plastered ceiling with its beams remaining hidden though some ceiling beams in the chancel are visible. The chancel floor is partially tiled.

The church belongs to the Diocese of Worcester with its denomination being Church of England, and small services are still held. It lies upon the pilgrimage route to Wales from Worcester, and is today a visitors centre.

== History ==
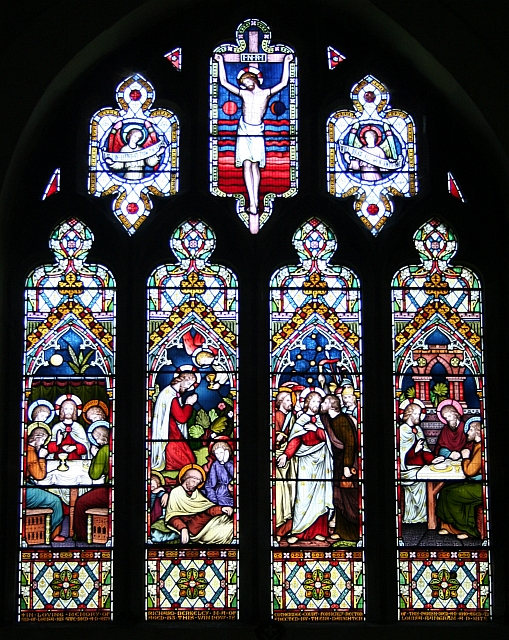
East Window, St. Leonard's, Cotheridge.

=== Chancel and nave ===
The oldest parts of the church are the chancel and the nave which contains a carved, stone Norman Arch dividing them. These date to the early part of the 12th century during the reign of Henry I. The walls of the chancel and the nave are probably sandstone, but they are plastered on both sides. The windows in the nave are also 12th century. The ceiling of the nave is plastered, and is curved with no beams showing.

=== Bell tower ===
During the 15th century the wooden, bell tower was added. It is square, ascends in four stages and is built of chestnut and oak. The studded, oak doorway to the tower also provides access to the church.

=== Pulpit ===
Dating from the 17th century it is oak-panelled and is hexagonal in shape.

=== Floor tiles ===
In the chancel the floor is made of reddish tiles. Four of them bear the arms of Gloucester Abbey, three of them with the Elephant Head of Throckmorton, two carry the Berkeley arms, and one a Passion Shield inscribed in Latin.

=== Ownership ===
Since 1570 the ownership has followed the descent of the manor house, Cotheridge Court, and in 1623 John Acton sold the church to William Berkeley, who had previously purchased the manor from Acton in 1615.

=== Restoration ===
In 1684 it received restoration from Rowland Berkeley and between 1615 and 1939 it has been cared for by the Berkeley family. It is now a part of the Diocese of Worcester.

==== Collapsed roof ====
In November, 1947 the nave roof collapsed. Though there were only about 200 people in the parish they decided to save their church. After 13 years the restoration work was completed but it was considered unsafe to leave the four bells in the bell tower, and to this day only one remains.

Once again, in April 1979 the nave roof was considered unsafe with the possibility of collapsing. The people of Cotheridge and their neighbouring parishes raised money for the restoration. With additional help from the Worcester Diocese, English Heritage and the Historic Churches Preservation Trust the work was completed in 1987.

=== Churchyard ===
The churchyard contains two war graves of Royal Artillery soldiers of World War II.
