= Cotheridge Court =

Manor house in Worcestershire, England

- Location in Worcestershire

General information
- Type: Manor house
- Architectural style: Vernacular English
- Location: Cotheridge, Worcestershire, England, United Kingdom
- Coordinates: 52.189496°N 2.316892°W
- Current tenants: Residential use
- Construction started: 16th century (on site mentioned in Domesday Book)
- Owner: Private (subdivided flats)

Technical details
- Material: Timber frame, brick, plaster

Cotheridge Court is a Grade II* listed ancient manor house situated in the south-western part of Cotheridge, in the county of Worcestershire, England, and birthplace of Herbert Bowyer Berkeley. The house bought in 1615 by William Berkeley, eldest son of Rowland Berkeley (1548-1611) of Spetchley, was owned and lived in by the Berkeley family for nearly 350 years, but the manor is over one thousand years old. This family descended from the Berkeleys of Berkeley Castle Gloucestershire, and Eadnoth. Cotheridge Court is now a private residence of sub-divided flats.

== History ==
=== Before the Domesday Survey ===
In 963, Oswald, Bishop of Worcester, granted land called 'Coddanhrycce' to thegn Aelfric for three successive generations, being limited to male heirs.

=== Domesday Book ===
In the Domesday Book, a timber-framed court is mentioned. The existing house dates back to the 16th century, and perhaps even further back. It is built upon the site of the original dwelling mentioned in the Domesday Book.

=== 17th century ===
Prior to 1615, the manor was held by a succession of various owners. In 1615, it was sold to William Berkeley (1582–1658) of Cowleigh, eldest son of Rowland Berkeley (1548–1611) of Worcester and Spetchley, a wealthy Worcester clothier who originated from Hereford. The house then was a large, two-storey timber-framed dwelling with a third floor of gabled attics having carved bargeboards. The house contained a small, panelled room known as the 'sots hole' where drunks were held in order to sleep off their drunkenness. This room probably dates back to pre-15th century and before, when the house was a Court House.

William, Sheriff of Worcestershire in 1617, was succeeded by his son, Sir Rowland Berkeley (1613–1696). Sir Rowland's only son, Thomas, died unmarried, on 25 October 1669, in Greece. He was on a diplomatic mission to Turkey, travelling with His Excellency Sir Daniel Harvey from King Charles II to Sultan Mahomethan, Emperor of the Turks. The two men were travelling from Constantinople towards Thessalonica when Thomas fell ill. He was 30 years old and his remains were buried amongst Christians. Having no other sons, Cotheridge Court passed to Sir Rowland's eldest daughter Elizabeth. She married in 1681 Henry Green who adopted the surname Berkeley. Their eldest son became the next Rowland Berkeley of Cotheridge who died in 1731.

=== 18th century ===
In 1770, the entrance front to the house, as well as the south front were cased with brick and the old windows were replaced with large, sash windows. The old, gabled attics were concealed behind a wall of brick; and sham, glazed windows were added to the new, brick front giving the appearance of a third floor without attics. The north wing of the house, as well as part of the back were not modernized, and remained as timber and plaster.

In 1764, another Rowland Berkeley (1732–1805) became Sheriff of Worcestershire and from May to September 1774 was Member of Parliament for Droitwich.

==== Ha-ha ====
In the mid- or late 18th century, a ha-ha was installed where the gardens met with the pastureland. This was to provide the house with a clean view of the grazing cattle and the breath-taking, prominent Malvern Hills in the far distance.

=== 19th century ===
Rowland Berkeley (1732–1805), was succeeded by his brother the Rev. Henry Rowland Berkeley, D.C.L., Fellow of New College, Oxford, who also died childless in 1832. Eventually it passed to William Berkeley Esquire who died in 1869 and the manor passed to his eldest son the Rev. William Comyns Berkeley. His son Rowland, eldest brother to Herbert Bowyer Berkeley inherited the manor.

At about the mid-part of the century a delicate, ornamental stone balustrade was added to the top of the brick facing, above the sham, glazed windows.

==== Noake's History ====
It is mentioned in John Noake's History of Worcestershire that from the road to Bromyard an avenue of limes some three-quarters of a mile in length, and in a straight line runs from the road to Cotheridge Court.

== Rowland Berkeley of Cotheridge ==
- Rowland Berkeley (1548–1611) of Worcester and Spetchley bought land at Cotheridge.
- William Berkeley (1582–1658) bought the manor of Cotheridge 1615.
- Sir Rowland Berkeley (1613–1696).
- Rowland Berkeley (died 1731) grandson of Sir Rowland, son of Elizabeth Berkeley and Henry Greene.
- Rowland Berkeley (died 1759).
- Rowland Berkeley (1732–1805).
- Henry Rowland Berkeley (1740–1832).
- Richard Rowland Berkeley (died 1840) born Tomkyns nephew of Henry Rowland Berkeley (1740–1832).
- John Rowland Berkeley (died 1850) nephew of Rowland Berkeley (died 1759).
- William Berkeley (1784–1869) nephew of Rowland Berkeley (died 1759).
- William Comyns Berkeley (1810–1885).
- Rowland Comyns Berkeley (1846–1925).
