= Christopher Dighton =

English politician

Christopher Dighton or Deighton (Nov. 1559–1604) was an English politician who sat in the House of Commons between 1601 and 1604.

Dighton was the son of Christopher Dighton (who died 1587), a vintner who served as MP for Worcester and bailiff of the city.

He was elected member of parliament for Worcester in 1601, and re-elected in 1604. He sat until his death on 2 August 1604.

Parliament of England
Preceded by Rowland Berkeley; William Bagnall	Member of Parliament for Worcester; 1601–1604; With: Rowland Berkeley 1601; John Coucher 1604	Succeeded by John Coucher; Rowland Berkeley
