= St. Leo Church =

St. Leo Church or St. Leo's Catholic Church or variations may refer to:

- St. Leo's Roman Catholic Church, Mimico, in Toronto, Ontario, Canada
- Chapel of St Leo, Żurrieq, Malta

== United States ==
- Saint Leo the Great Parish, San Jose, California
- St. Leo's Church (Baltimore, Maryland), listed on the National Register of Historic Places (NRHP)
- St. Leo's Catholic Church (Lewistown, Montana), NRHP-listed
- St. Leo Church (New York City)
- Saint Leo Oratory (Columbus, Ohio)

== See also ==
- St. Leonard's Church (disambiguation)
