= Thomas Chettle =

English politician

Thomas Chettle (died c. 1640) was an English politician who sat in the House of Commons in 1614.

Chettle was of Worcester and was possibly admitted to Gray's Inn in 1569. He was bailiff of Worcester in 1603 and 1605. In 1614, he was elected member of parliament for Worcester. He was an alderman in 1621 and was mayor in 1631. In August 1631 he was fined £20 for not taking a knighthood.

Chettle died aged about 88 and had a monument at Kemsey.

Chettle married the daughter of Mr Hanbury, auditor to James I. He was father of Thomas Chettle of Needberrow Park.

His daughter Margaret married William Berkeley (1582–1658) of Cotheridge.

Parliament of England
Preceded by John Coucher; Rowland Berkeley	Member of Parliament for Worcester; 1614; With: John Coucher	Succeeded by John Coucher; Robert Berkeley
