= Grafton, Worcestershire =

Hamlet in Worcestershire, England

Coordinates: 52.0332°N 2.0209°W

Grafton
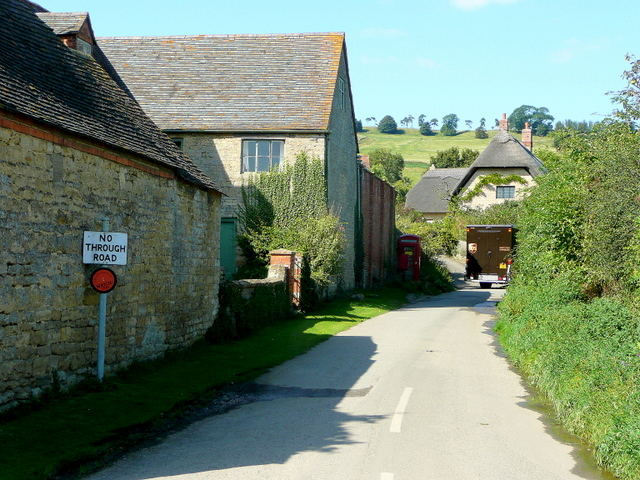

- Location within Worcestershire
- OS grid reference: SO 987 372
- District: Wychavon
- Shire county: Worcestershire
- Region: West Midlands
- Country: England
- Sovereign state: United Kingdom
- Police: West Mercia
- Fire: Hereford and Worcester
- Ambulance: West Midlands

Grafton is a hamlet in Worcestershire, England, situated between the villages of Beckford and Ashton under Hill, south-east of Bredon Hill.

The name Grafton means a woodland settlement.

There was a chapel at Grafton from the mid-12th century, a dependent chapel of the minster church at Beckford. About 1543 it was broken into by local men, and apparently damaged beyond repair. Norman Cottage, a privately owned building, now stands on the site. It dates from the 17th century, and incorporates the north, west and east walls, and the chancel arch, of the 12th-century chapel.

A field near Grafton is called Knight's Field. Edward IV knighted some of his soldiers here after the Battle of Tewkesbury in 1471.
