= Fuzzy associative matrix =

A fuzzy associative matrix expresses fuzzy logic rules in tabular form. These rules usually take two variables as input, mapping cleanly to a two-dimensional matrix, although theoretically a matrix of any number of dimensions is possible. From the perspective of neuro-fuzzy systems, the mathematical matrix is called a "Fuzzy associative memory" because it stores the weights of the perceptron.

== Applications ==
In the context of game AI programming, a fuzzy associative matrix helps to develop the rules for non-player characters. Suppose a professional is tasked with writing fuzzy logic rules for a video game monster. In the game being built, entities have two variables: hit points (HP) and firepower (FP):

| HP/FP | Very low HP | Low HP | Medium HP | High HP | Very high HP |
|---|---|---|---|---|---|
| Very weak FP | Retreat! | Retreat! | Defend | Defend | Defend |
| Weak FP | Retreat! | Defend | Defend | Attack | Attack |
| Medium FP | Retreat! | Defend | Attack | Attack | Full attack! |
| High FP | Retreat! | Defend | Attack | Attack | Full attack! |
| Very high FP | Defend | Attack | Attack | Full attack! | Full attack! |

This translates to:

IF MonsterHP IS VeryLowHP AND MonsterFP IS VeryWeakFP THEN Retreat
IF MonsterHP IS LowHP AND MonsterFP IS VeryWeakFP THEN Retreat
IF MonsterHP IS MediumHP AND MonsterFP is VeryWeakFP THEN Defend

Multiple rules can fire at once, and often will, because the distinction between "very low" and "low" is fuzzy. If it is more "very low" than it is low, then the "very low" rule will generate a stronger response. The program will evaluate all the rules that fire and use an appropriate defuzzification method to generate its actual response.

An implementation of this system might use either the matrix or the explicit IF/THEN form. The matrix makes it easy to visualize the system, but it also makes it impossible to add a third variable just for one rule, so it is less flexible.

== Identify a rule set ==
There is no inherent pattern in the matrix. It appears as if the rules were just made up, and indeed they were. This is both a strength and a weakness of fuzzy logic in general. It is often impractical or impossible to find an exact set of rules or formulae for dealing with a specific situation. For a sufficiently complex game, a mathematician would not be able to study the system and figure out a mathematically accurate set of rules. However, this weakness is intrinsic to the realities of the situation, not of fuzzy logic itself. The strength of the system is that even if one of the rules is wrong, even greatly wrong, other rules that are correct are likely to fire as well and they may compensate for the error.

This does not mean a fuzzy system should be sloppy. Depending on the system, it might get away with being sloppy, but it will underperform. While the rules are fairly arbitrary, they should be chosen carefully. If possible, an expert should decide on the rules, and the sets and rules should be tested vigorously and refined as needed. In this way, a fuzzy system is like an expert system. (Fuzzy logic is used in many true expert systems, as well.)
