= Old Council Offices, Pershore =

Municipal building in Pershore, Worcestershire, England

Old Council Offices
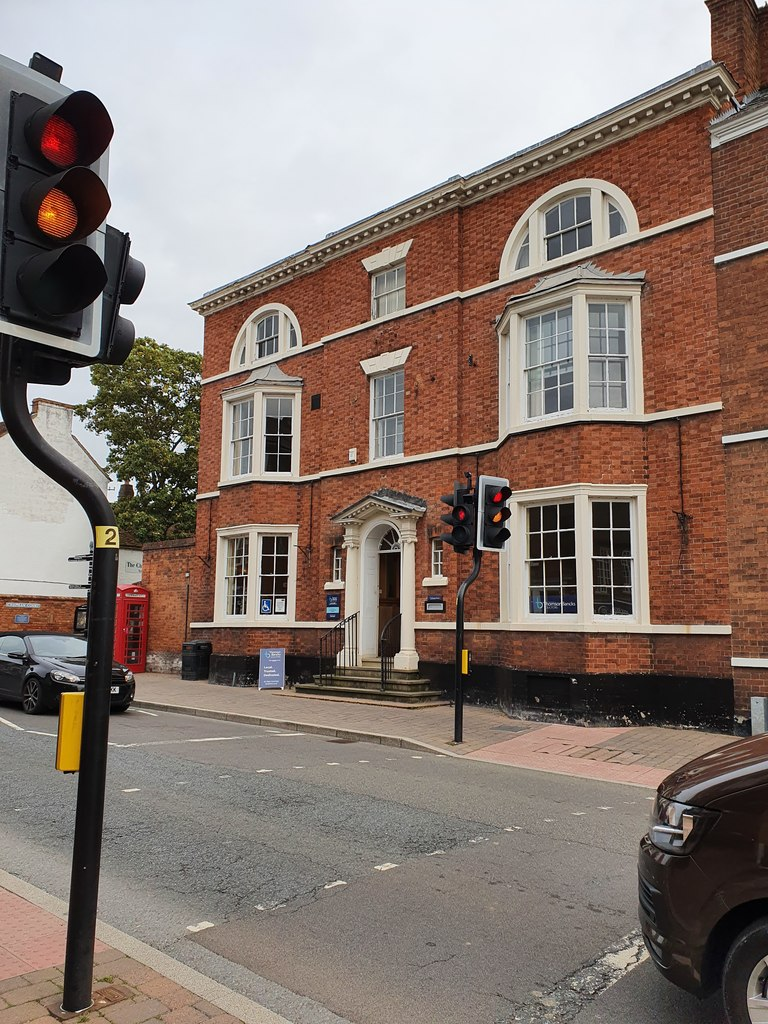
- The building in 2020

- Shown in Worcestershire
- 52.1112°N 2.0751°W
- Location: High Street, Pershore

History
- Built: c.1800

Site notes
- Architectural style: Neoclassical style

Listed Building – Grade II*
- Official name: 37, High Street
- Designated: 11 February 1965
- Reference no.: 1387076

The Old Council Offices, also known as No. 37 High Street, is a former municipal building in the High Street in Pershore, a town in Worcestershire, in England. Originally commissioned by a tanning family as a private house, it served as the headquarters of Pershore Rural District Council and then of Wychavon District Council, before becoming the offices of a firm of solicitors. It is a Grade II* listed building.

== History ==
Excavation has suggested that tanning was carried out on this site as early as the 17th century. The current building was commissioned as a three-storey private house for a tanning family. The building was designed in the neoclassical style, built in red brick with stone dressings and, although elements may be older, it was rebuilt in about 1800. The site continued to be used for tanning, with a small workshop behind the house, until about 1830.

The design involved a symmetrical main frontage of three bays facing onto the High Street. The central bay, which was slightly projected forward, featured a porch formed by a pair of unfluted Ionic order columns supporting an open pediment, with sash windows with voussoirs and keystones on the first and second floors. The outer bays were fenestrated by bay windows on the ground and first floors and by Diocletian windows on the second floor. There were painted moulded bands between each of the floors and, at roof level, there was a modillioned cornice.

A sanitary district was established in the Pershore area in 1875. In 1894, it was succeeded by Pershore Rural District Council, which initially met in the boardroom at the local workhouse in Station Road. The council acquired No. 37 High Street in 1937 and the building continued to serve as its offices for much of the 20th century. A telephone kiosk, designed by Sir Giles Gilbert Scott and installed outside No. 37 in around 1935, is also listed.

Following local government reorganisation in 1974, it became the local offices of Wychavon District Council and continued in that use, until the council moved to Pershore Civic Centre in Queen Elizabeth Drive in 1991. It was subsequently converted for commercial use and is now occupied by a firm of solicitors, Thomson & Bancks.

== See also ==
- Grade II* listed buildings in Wychavon
