= Robert Berkeley (judge) =

English judge and politician

Sir Robert Berkeley (1584 – 5 August 1656) was an English judge and politician who sat in the House of Commons from 1621 to 1624. He suffered considerably for giving a judgement in favour of Ship Money.

Berkeley was born at Worcester, the son of Rowland Berkeley and his wife Catherine Hayward, daughter of Thomas Hayward. He was admitted to Middle Temple in 1600 and was called to the bar on 6 May 1608. In 1611 he inherited Spetchley on the death of his father and went on to buy further properties including Cudeley.

== Justice of the King's Bench ==
He was High Sheriff of Worcestershire in 1613. In 1620 he became JP and in 1621 became Recorder of Worcester. He was elected Member of Parliament for Worcester in 1621. In 1623, he was recorder again and was appointed. one of the Council of the Marches of Wales 30 June, being sworn in as such at Worcester on 13 October. He was re-elected MP for Worcester in 1624. In 1626 he was Autumn Reader of his Inn. He became Serjeant-at-law on 28 February 1627, King's Serjeant on 12 April 1627 and was knighted on 14 April 1627. On 11 October 1632 he was appointed one of the Justices of the King's Bench. He was appointed one of the Avon compensation commissioners on 9 April 1637.

=== Impeached of high treason ===
Berkeley was impeached by the Long Parliament for high treason on 12 February 1641, after in 1637 he gave his judicial opinion in favour of the legality of Ship-Money. He was arrested in open Court while sitting on the Bench, and was imprisoned in the Tower of London. According to Frederick Charles Cass, "the energetic terms in which he gave expression to the judgment had rendered him more obnoxious to the Commons than his colleagues." In September 1643 the House of Lords deprived him of his office, and fined him £20,000, of which he paid one half to secure the waiver of the remainder and his release.

=== Civil War ===
In 1651, before the Battle of Worcester, his house at Spetchley Park was burnt by Scottish Presbyterians to prevent it falling into Parliamentary hands. Berkeley converted the stables into a dwelling-house, and "lived with content and even dignity upon the wreck of his fortune".

Berkeley died at the age of 72 and was buried under a monument with a marble figure of the judge in the chancel at Spetchley.

Berkeley married Elizabeth Conyers, daughter of Thomas Conyers, of East Barnet, Hertfordshire.

Parliament of England
Preceded by John Coucher; Thomas Chettle	Member of Parliament for Worcester; 1621–1624; With: John Coucher	Succeeded by Walter Devereux; Henry Spelman
