= Eckington, Worcestershire =

Village in Worcestershire, England

Coordinates: 52.071897°N 2.115575°W

Eckington
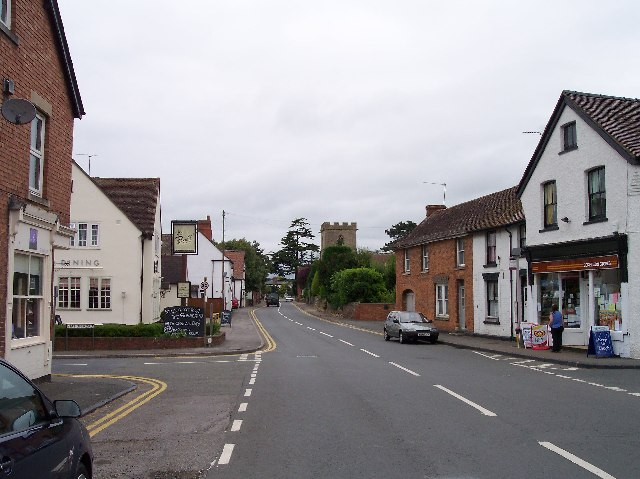

- Location within Worcestershire
- Population: 1,202
- OS grid reference: SO9241
- District: Wychavon
- Shire county: Worcestershire
- Region: West Midlands
- Country: England
- Sovereign state: United Kingdom
- Post town: Pershore
- Postcode district: WR10
- UK Parliament: West Worcestershire

Eckington is a small village and civil parish in the Wychavon district of Worcestershire, England.

The River Avon passes the village to its north and west, and these areas are prone to flooding. It is situated at the north-west side of Bredon Hill, an outcrop of the Cotswolds. The nearest towns to Eckington, also situated along the River Avon, are Pershore which is 4 miles (6 km) north and Evesham 10 miles (16 km) north east. The historic town of Tewkesbury is situated 8 miles (13 km) south west on the River Severn which river also runs through the nearest city of Worcester (13 miles (21 km) from Eckington).

Eckington is renowned for Eckington Bridge, which is the subject of a poem by Arthur Quiller-Couch, its village cross and its Norman-period church.

== History ==
The name Eckington derives from the Old English Eccaingtūn or Ecciingtūn, meaning 'settlement connected with Ecca/Ecci'.

One of the Pilgrim Fathers, George Soule, is believed to have come from the village.

The Grade II listed village cross now stands in a grass triangle at the junction of Church Street and Drakes Bridge Road 52°4'18.83"N+2°6'56.28"W. It was moved to there when restored in 1897, and given a Maltese Cross. The base and shaft are medieval with Victorian inscriptions on north and south faces of the shaft, the former barely visible. The inscription reads:

DOMINE•SALVAM•FAC•REGINAM•MDCCCXCVII (God Save the Queen 1897).

== Facilities ==
Eckington has a riverside wharf, a school, the Eckington Church of England First School, a recreation centre and scout hut with surrounding recreation grounds, home to the village's football and cricket teams, and a village hall. In 2023, Community Fields were opened, with paths for walking, grassed and wild flower areas, and a memorial garden near to the cemetery. The village also has a village shop, a hairdresser, and two pubs, The Bell and The Anchor, both offering food and guest accommodation; a third pub, The Crown, closed in the early 1990s.

Eckington railway station was located on the Bristol to Birmingham Line main railway line. It closed in January 1965.
