= William Combe =

British writer and adventurer (1742-1823)

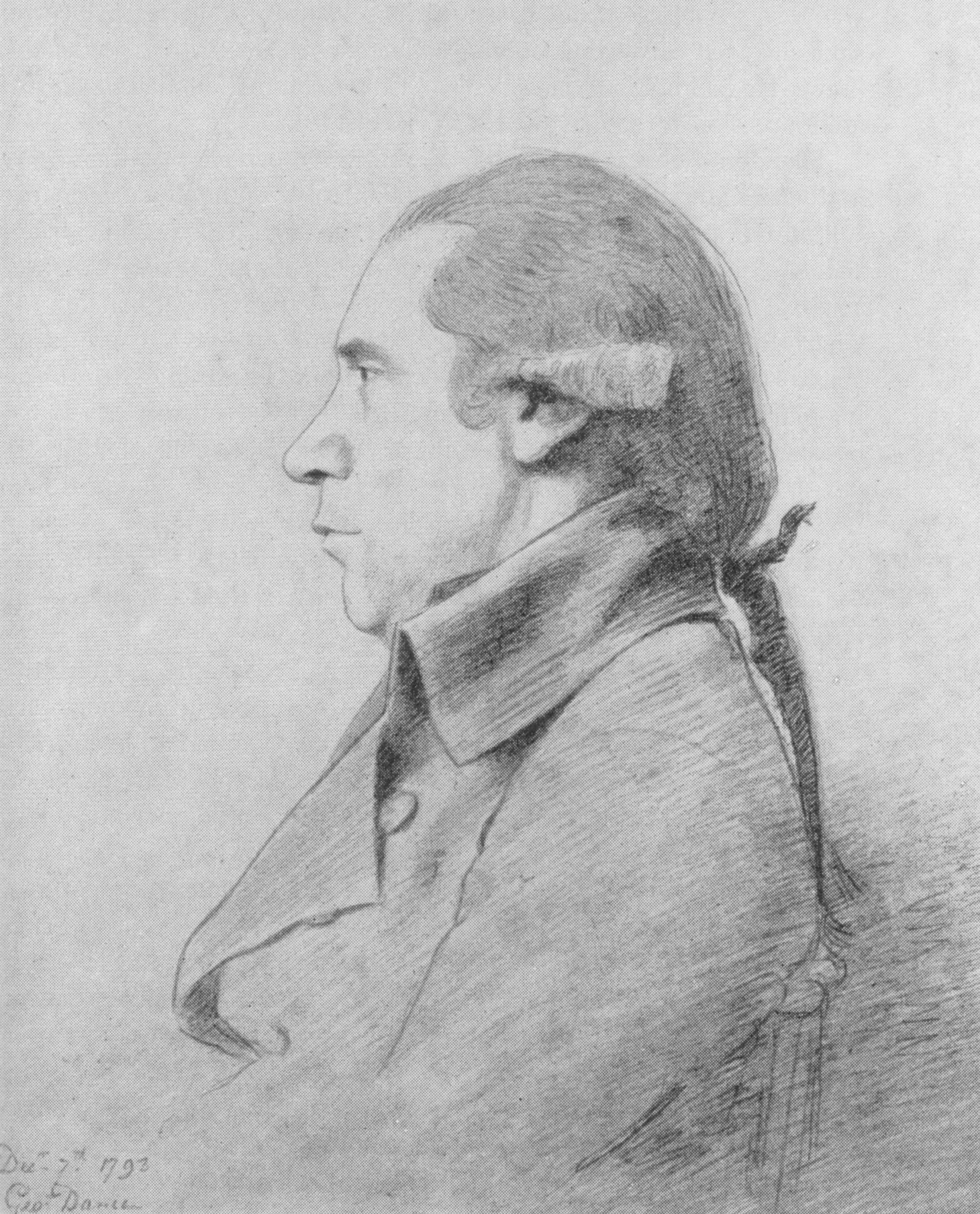
Portrait of William Combe drawn by George Dance (1793)

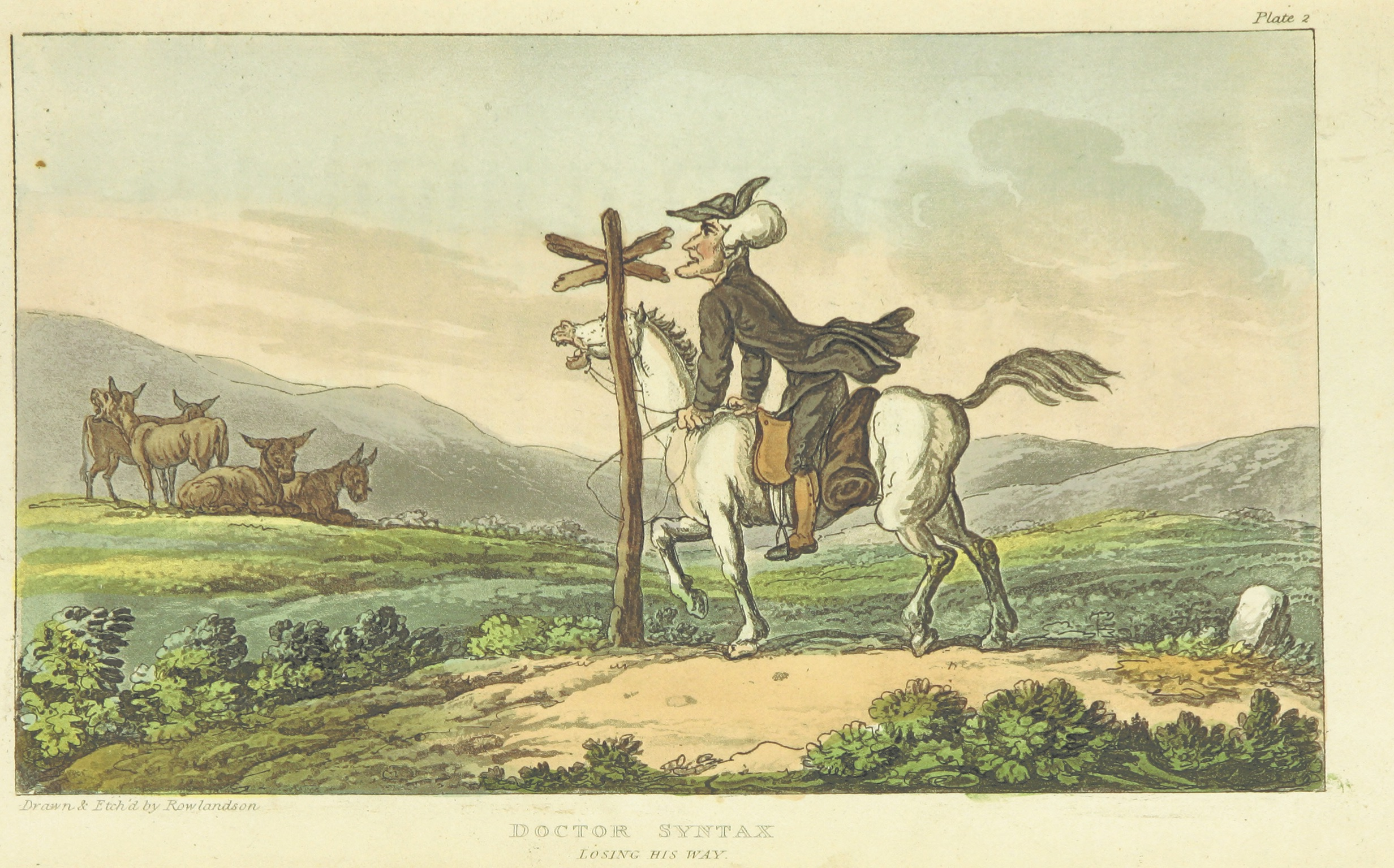
Dr Syntax, losing his way. Combe wrote verses to accompany Thomas Rowlandson's comic caricatures.

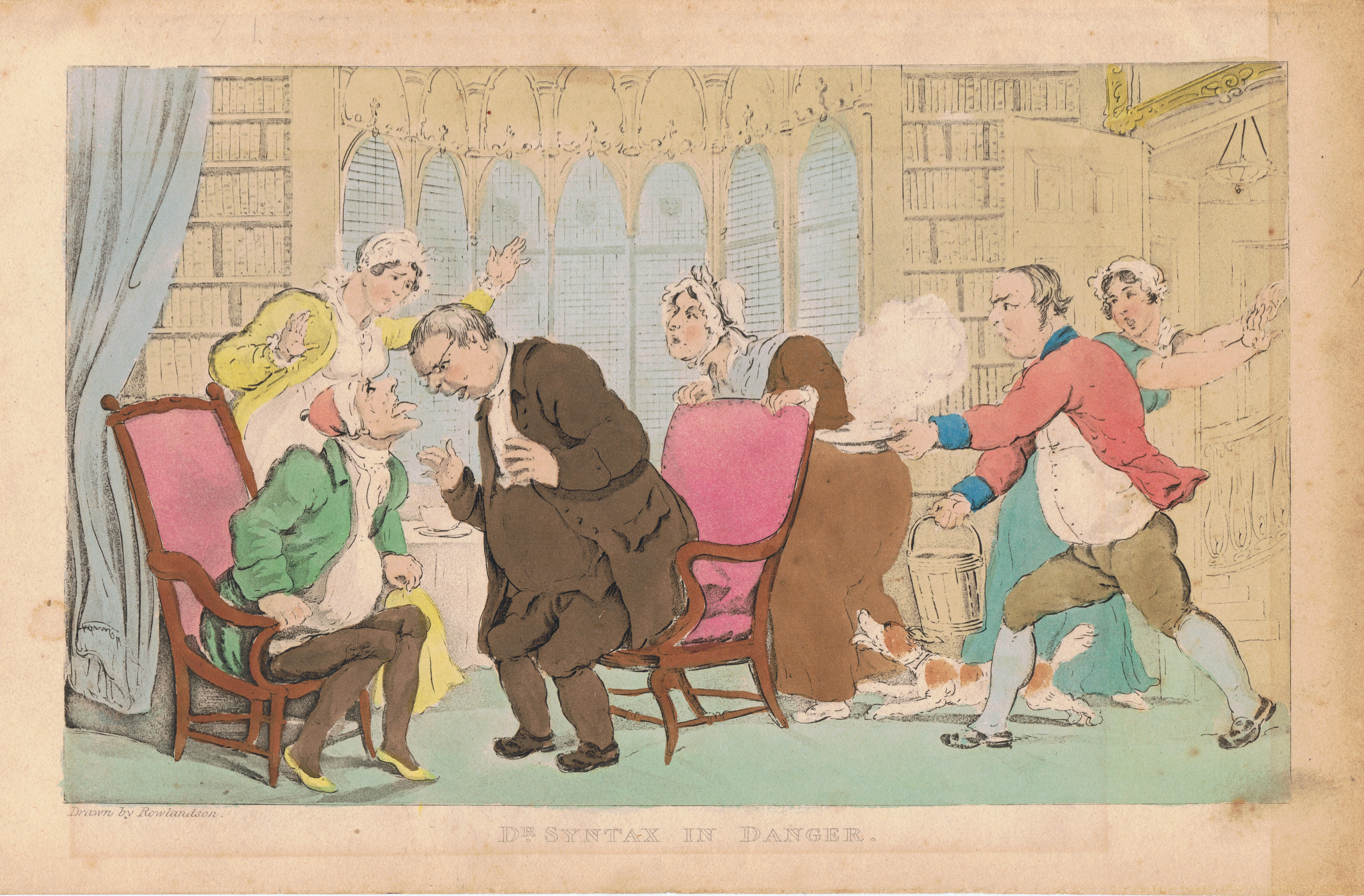
Dr Syntax in Danger, print after a drawing by Thomas Rowlandson

William Combe (25 March 1742 – 19 June 1823) was a British miscellaneous writer. His early life was that of an adventurer; his later life was passed chiefly within the "rules" of the King's Bench Prison. He is most notable as the author of The Three Tours of Doctor Syntax, a comic poem, illustrated by artist Thomas Rowlandson's colour plates, that satirised William Gilpin. Combe also wrote a series of imaginary letters, supposed to have been written by the second, or "wicked" Lord Lyttelton. Of a similar kind were his letters between Swift and "Stella". He also wrote the letterpress for various illustrated books, and was a general hack.

== Early life ==
Combe's father, Robert Combes, was a rich Bristol ironmonger who died in 1756; his mother, Susannah Hill (died 1748), was from a Quaker background. He was educated at Eton College, but was withdrawn from the school by William Alexander, his guardian, on his father's death; Alexander died in 1762. He inherited from both his father and guardian, aspired to the status of gentleman, and changed his name to Combe. He spent his fortune, travelled and was nicknamed "Count Combe"; and in the period 1769–1773 was low in funds, existing in France, Wales and the West Midlands.

In 1773 Robert Berkeley employed Combe to edit Thomas Falkner's Description of Patagonia. Combe then settled to work as a writer and book editor.

== Works ==
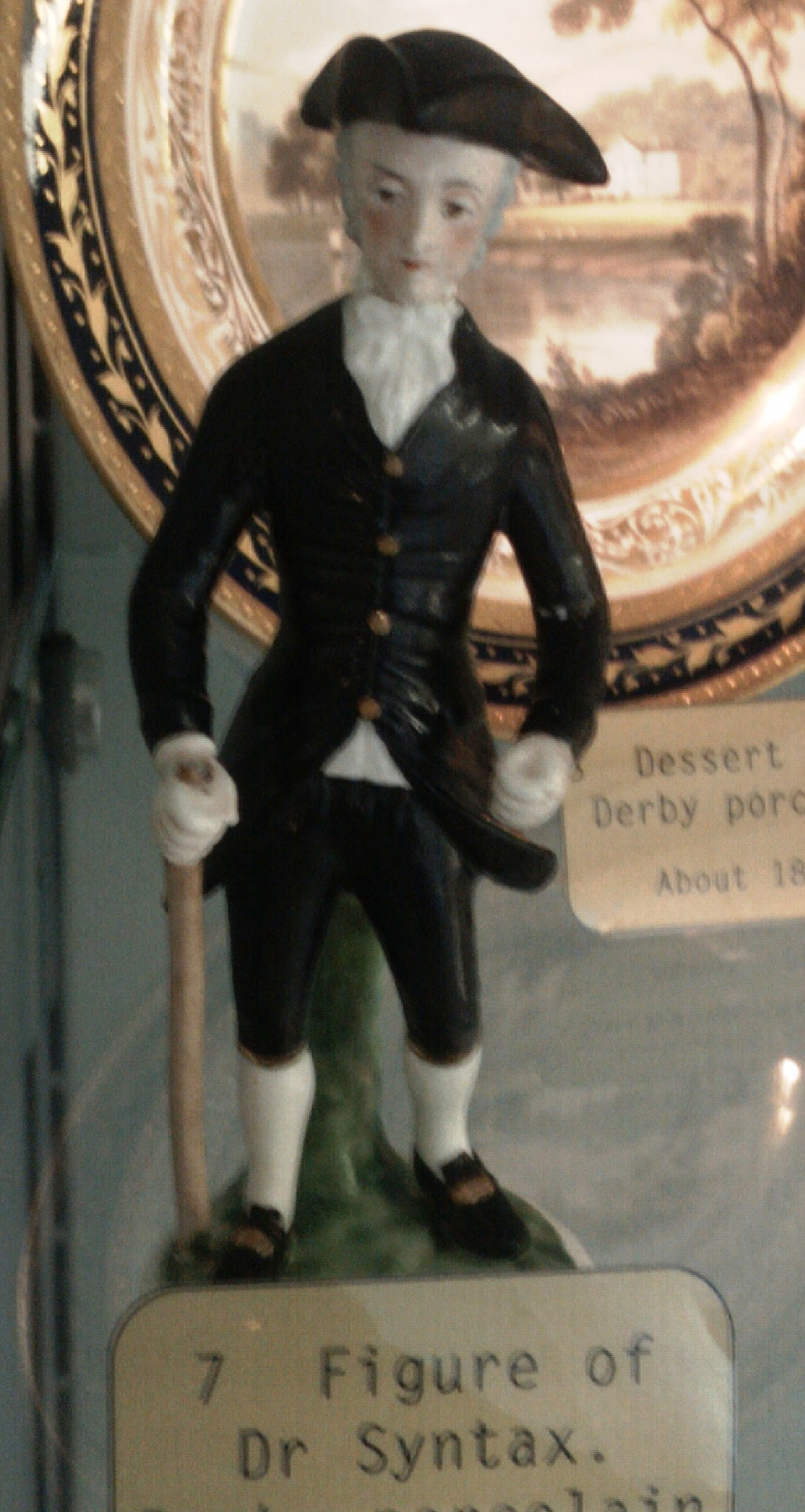
A Derby Porcelain figure of Dr Syntax in Derby Museum

In 1776 Combe made his first success in London with The Diaboliad, a satire full of bitter personal attacks. Four years later, in 1780, debts brought him into the King's Bench Prison, and much of his subsequent life was spent in prison.

Combe's spurious Letters of the Late Lord Lyttelton (1780) took in many of his contemporaries: as late as 1851, a writer in the Quarterly Review regarded these letters as authentic, basing on them a claim to have solved the riddle of identity of Junius, in Thomas Lyttelton, 2nd Baron Lyttelton. An early acquaintance with Laurence Sterne resulted in Combe's anonymous Letters supposed to have been written by Yorick and Eliza (1779), the named characters being from Sterne's The Life and Opinions of Tristram Shandy, Gentleman. Periodical literature of all sorts—pamphlets, satires, burlesques, "two thousand columns for the papers," "two hundred biographies"—filled up the next years, and about 1789 Combe was receiving £200 yearly from the Pitt government as a pamphleteer.

In 1790 and 91, the six volumes of a Devil on Two Sticks in England won for Combe the title of "the English le Sage". In 1794 he ghost-wrote the Aeneas Anderson memoir of the Macartney Embassy to Peking, A Narrative of the British Embassy to China, in the Years 1792, 1793, and 1794. In 1794–1796 he wrote the text for Boydell's History of the River Thames, and in 1803 he began to write for The Times. From 1809 to 1811 he wrote for Ackermann's The Poetical Magazine the serialized comic poem The Tour of Dr Syntax in Search of the Picturesque, descriptive and moralizing verse illustrated by artist Thomas Rowlandson's colour plates. It satirised William Gilpin, who toured Britain to describe his theory of the Picturesque. It was collected in book form in 1812, and was followed by two similar Tours, "...in search of Consolation" (1819) and "...in search of a Wife," the first Mrs Syntax having died at the end of the first Tour. The second Tour was collected as an 1820 book, and the third tour as an 1821 book. Some reprint editions over the next several decades rendered Rowlandson's colour plates in black and white.

Then came Six Poems in illustration of drawings by Princess Elizabeth (1813), The English Dance of Death (1815–1816), The Dance of Life (1816–1817), The Adventures of Johnny Quae Genus (1822)—all written for Rowlandson's caricatures; together with histories of Oxford and Cambridge, and of Westminster Abbey for Ackermann; Picturesque Tours along the Rhine and other rivers, Histories of Madeira, Antiquities of York, texts for Turner's Southern Coast Views, and contributions innumerable to the Literary Repository.

Combe died in London on 19 June 1823.

== Bibliography ==
=== Poetry ===
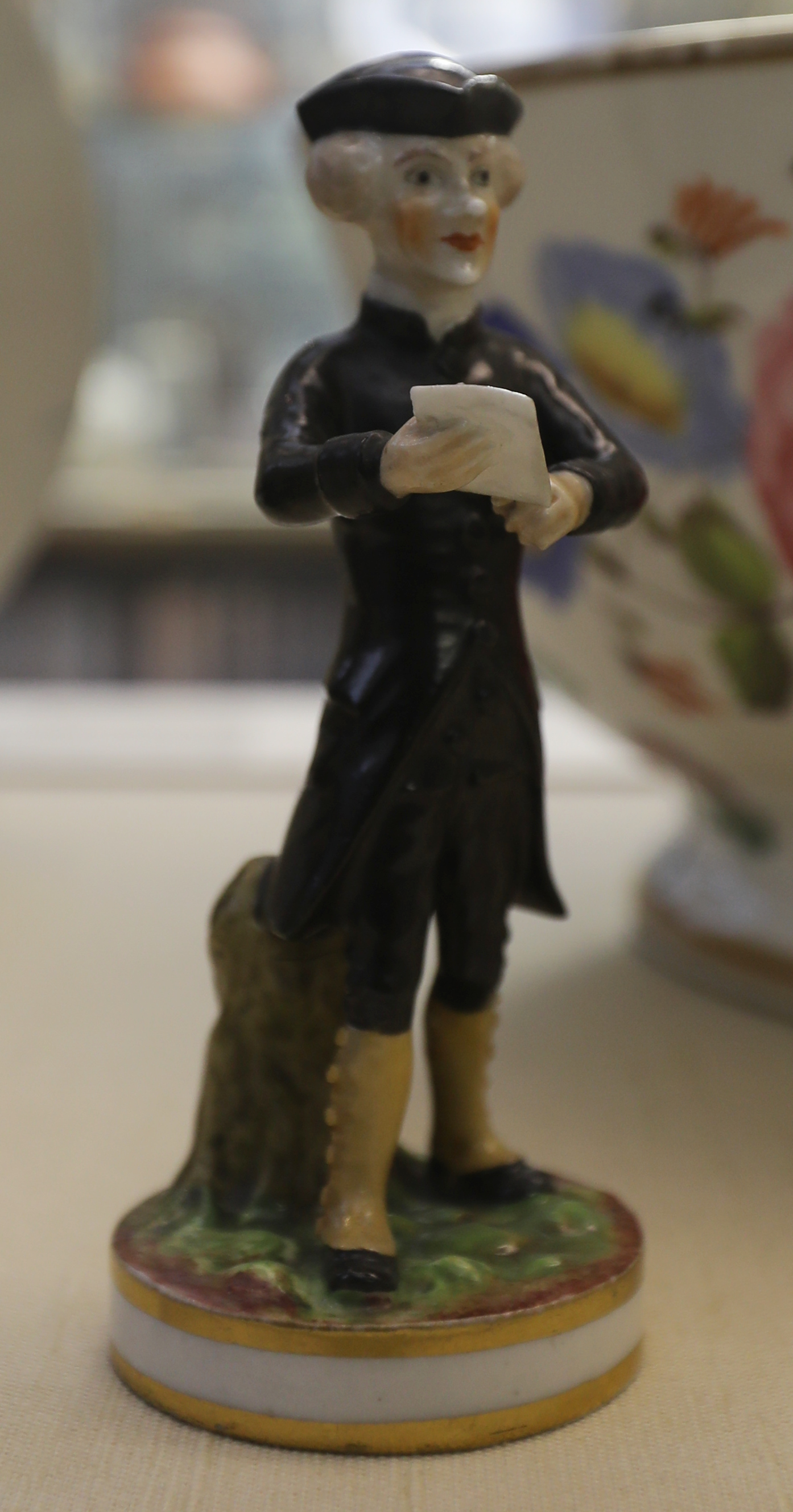
A depiction of Dr Syntax landing at Calais from the tour of Dr Syntax

- Clifton: a poem in imitation of Spenser (Bristol 1775)
- The Diaboliad: a Poem: Dedicated to the worst man in His Majesty's dominions. Also, the diabo-lady: or, a match in hell (1777)
- The Tour of Dr Syntax in Search of the Picturesque. A Poem (1812)
- The English Dance of Death 2 vols. (1815–16)]
- The Dance of Life (1817)
- The Second Tour in Search of Consolation (1820)
- Third Tour in Search of a Wife (1821)
- The History of Johnny Quae Genus, The Little Foundling of the Late Doctor Syntax (1822)
- The first of April: or, The triumphs of folly
- The justification
- The life of Napoleon, a Hudibrastic poem in fifteen cantos, by Doctor Syntax

=== Novels ===
- The Devil upon 2 Sticks in England: being a continuation of Le diable boiteux of Alain-René Lesage (Le Sage). (1st and 2nd editions in 4 volumes: 1790 and expanded 3rd-5th editions in 6 volumes: 1791, 1811, and 1817)
- Letters between Amelia in London and her mother in the country (1824) - posthumous

=== Edited letters ===
- Letters from Eliza to Yorick (1775)
- Letters supposed to have been written by Yorick and Eliza. 2 vols (1779)
- Letters to His Friends on Various Occasions by Laurence Sterne (1775)
- Original letters of the late Reverend Mr. Laurence Sterne: Never Before Published. (1788)
- Letters of the Late Lord Lyttleton. 2 vols (1780–2)

=== Non-fiction on England ===
- The Philosopher in Bristol (1775)
- An History of the River Thames. 2 vols (1794–96)
- The Thames, or Graphic Illustrations. 2 vols (1811)
- Microcosm of London: Vol 3 (1811)
- The history and antiquities of the city of York, from its origin to the present times
- A word in season to the traders and manufacturers of Great Britain
- Adam Anderson's A historical and chronological deduction of the origin of commerce from the earliest accounts. Containing an history of the great commercial interests of the British Empire. To which is prefixed an introduction, exhibiting a view of the ancient and modern state of Europe; of the importance of our colonies; and of the commerce, shipping, manufactures, fisheries, &c., of Great-Britain and Ireland; and their influence on the landed interest. With an appendix, containing the modern politico-commercial geography of the several countries of Europe. Carefully rev., cor. and continued to the present times (editor)

== Translations ==
- Doctor Syntaxes Reise at opsøge det Pittoreske, Danish translation (1820)
- Le Don Quichotte Romantique, ou voyage du Docteur Syntaxe, French translation (1821)
- Des Doktor Syntax Reise : ein Gedicht in 26 Gesängen nebst dreißig kolorirten Steinstichen; Herausgegeben zum Besten der Königlichen Preußischen General-Post-Armen-Kasse. (1822)
- Die Reisen des Doctors Syntax. Dem Deutschen einverleibt von Wolf-Dieter Bach und mit ihm gemeinsam herausgegeben von Norbert Miller und Karl Riha. 2 vols (1983)
- Doctor Syntax op zoek naar het pittoreske, Dutch translation by Martin Hulsenboom, Uitgeverij Ad. Donker, Rotterdam (2015)
