= Cookhill Priory =

Former Cistercian nunnery in Worcestershire, England

Coordinates: 52.2136°N 1.9228°W

Cookhill Priory was a Cistercian nunnery near Cookhill in Worcestershire, England. The nunnery was dissolved around 1540 and laicized. The main building of the nunnery was converted into a residence. It is now a Grade II*-listed building and houses a recording studio.

== History ==
The Priory is believed to be founded by Isabel de Mauduit, wife of William de Beauchamp, 9th Earl of Warwick in 1260, but it most likely dates to some years before then. It is on record that she was buried at Cookhill when she died, and that she had become a nun there by the time of his death in 1298. A tomb with a broken dedication was still present in the chapel in the seventeenth century.

The Priory was noted for its poverty and repeatedly exempted from taxation. Volume 2 of the History of the County of Worcester says:

The poverty of the house of Cookhill is indeed almost the chief feature of its known history. Almost every reference to the nuns is to speak of their poverty, to exempt them with other slenderly endowed houses from payment of any extraordinary taxation or to grant them respite for the arrears already owing to the king.

The numbers of nuns present was small, probably around seven, as at the time of dissolution. The Priory was dissolved in 1540, two or three years later than most, and the nuns given pensions.

It is now a Grade II*-listed building and occupied by a recording studio, VADA Studios.

In February 2008, it was filmed for the 2008 British horror film The Children.

== Description ==
The farmhouse incorporates the remains of the nunnery and probably dates to the fifteenth century with later additions. The building is a timber-framed structure, with clad with brick. The additions are built from brick with ashlar dressings. The two-storey front range faces west and is dated 1763. It has four bays with a angled bay window to the left. The three windows to the right are the early 20th century addition. A brick parapet over a modillioned stone cornice is present as are ashlar quoins.

== Burials ==
- Isabel de Mauduit, wife of William (III) de Beauchamp

== Tax dispute ==
The tax status of the property at its sale in 2001 after the death of Mrs Rosemary Antrobus made for two legal cases, known as Antrobus I and Antrobus II. These have influenced the current understanding of the definition of farm properties for agricultural property relief. HMRC agreed that the property was a farmhouse, but that it was not entitled to be viewed as a solely agricultural building.

== Sources ==
- Butler, Julie (2016). Tax Planning for Farm and Land Diversification. Bloomsbury Publishing. ISBN 978-1780439792.
- Pevsner, Nikolaus; Brookes, Alan (2007), "Cookhill", Worcestershire, The Buildings of England (Revised ed.), London: Yale University Press, pp. 238–239, ISBN 9780300112986, OL 10319229M
- Willis-Bund, J W; Page, William, eds. (1971). "Houses of Cistercian nuns: Priory of Cookhill". A History of the County of Worcester: Volume 2. London: Victoria County History. pp. 156–158.
