= Pershore Civic Centre =

Municipal building in Pershore, Worcestershire, England

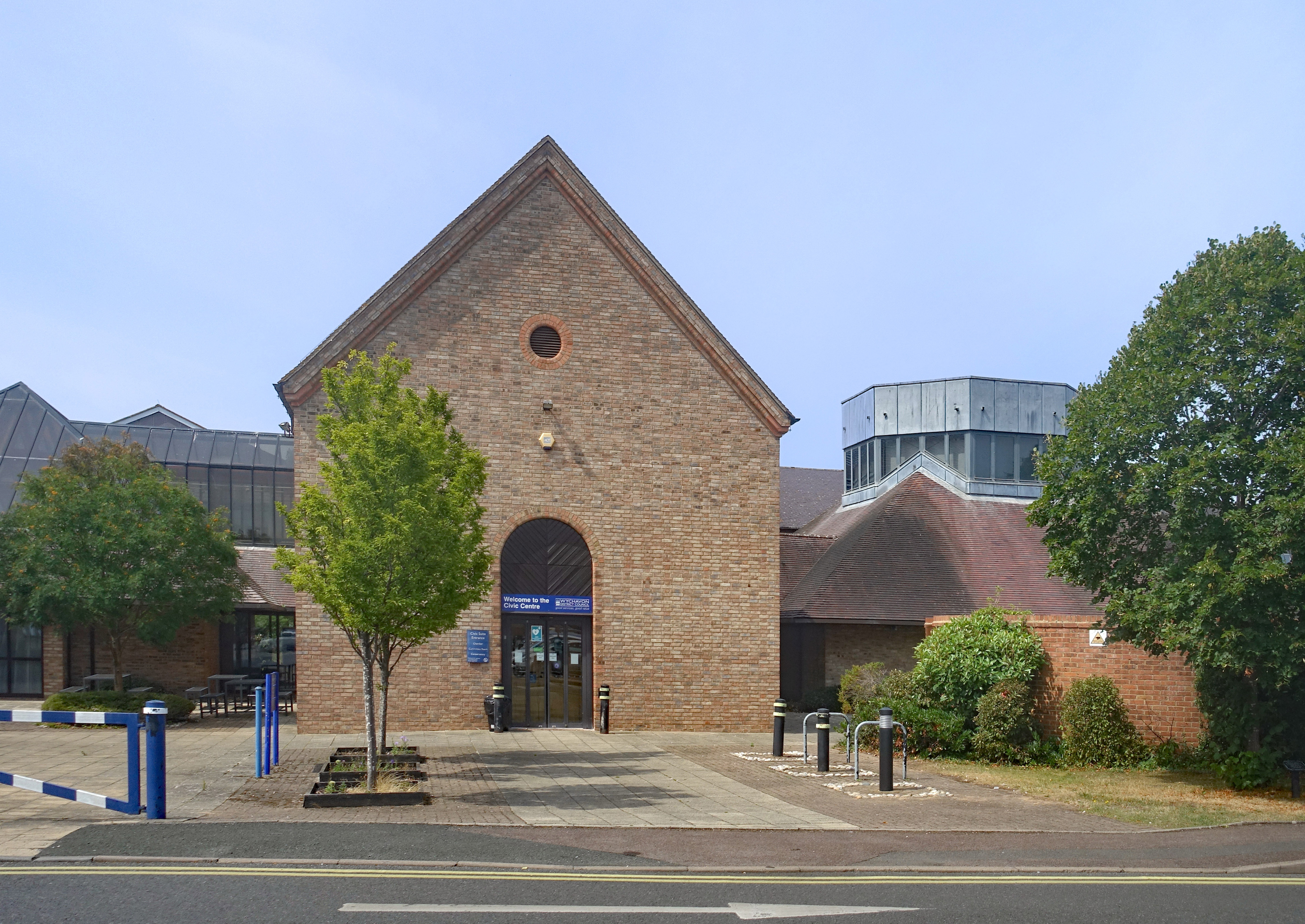
- Pershore Civic Centre in 2025

- Shown in Worcestershire
- 52.1145°N 2.0786°W
- Location: Queen Elizabeth Drive, Pershore

History
- Built: 1991

Site notes
- Architectural style: Modern style

Pershore Civic Centre is a municipal building in Queen Elizabeth Drive in Pershore, a town in Worcestershire, in England. The building accommodates the offices and meeting place of Wychavon District Council.

== History ==
A sanitary district was established in the Pershore area in 1875. In 1894, it was succeeded by Pershore Rural District Council, which initially met in the boardroom at the local workhouse in Station Road. In the mid-1930s, the council decided to acquire a three-storey private house, No. 37 High Street, for use as its offices. Following local government reorganisation in 1974, it became the local offices of Wychavon District Council and continued in that use throughout the 1980s.

However, in the mid-1980s, the council decided to consolidate its offices. In addition to No. 37 High Street, it had legacy offices in Droitwich and Evesham, as well as a former mission hall in Head Street. (Note: The old mission hall, also known as St Agatha's Hall, in Head Street, dated from 1895. Pershore Town Council acquired it from Wychavon District Council for use as its own offices in 1991.) The site it selected for the new civic centre was open land on the north side of the town. Construction work on the new building started in 1990. It was designed by the authority's chief architect in the modern style, built in red brick and was completed in 1991.

The layout of the building was unusual with a main spine running from the southwest to the northeast: several blocks projected out to the northwest, including a gabled entry block. Internally, the principal areas included a council chamber and other committee rooms, but there was also an emergency centre in the basement. The architectural historian, Alan Brooks, has described the building as "rambling" and "neo-vernacular".

A limited programme of refurbishment work, which included the installation of high definition closed-circuit television and monitoring equipment and the creation of a new business hub, was initiated at a cost of £250,000 in 2019. A further programme of work, which included the replacement of all the windows, and making the heating system more efficient, was undertaken at a costs of £500,000 in 2022.
