= Eckington Bridge =

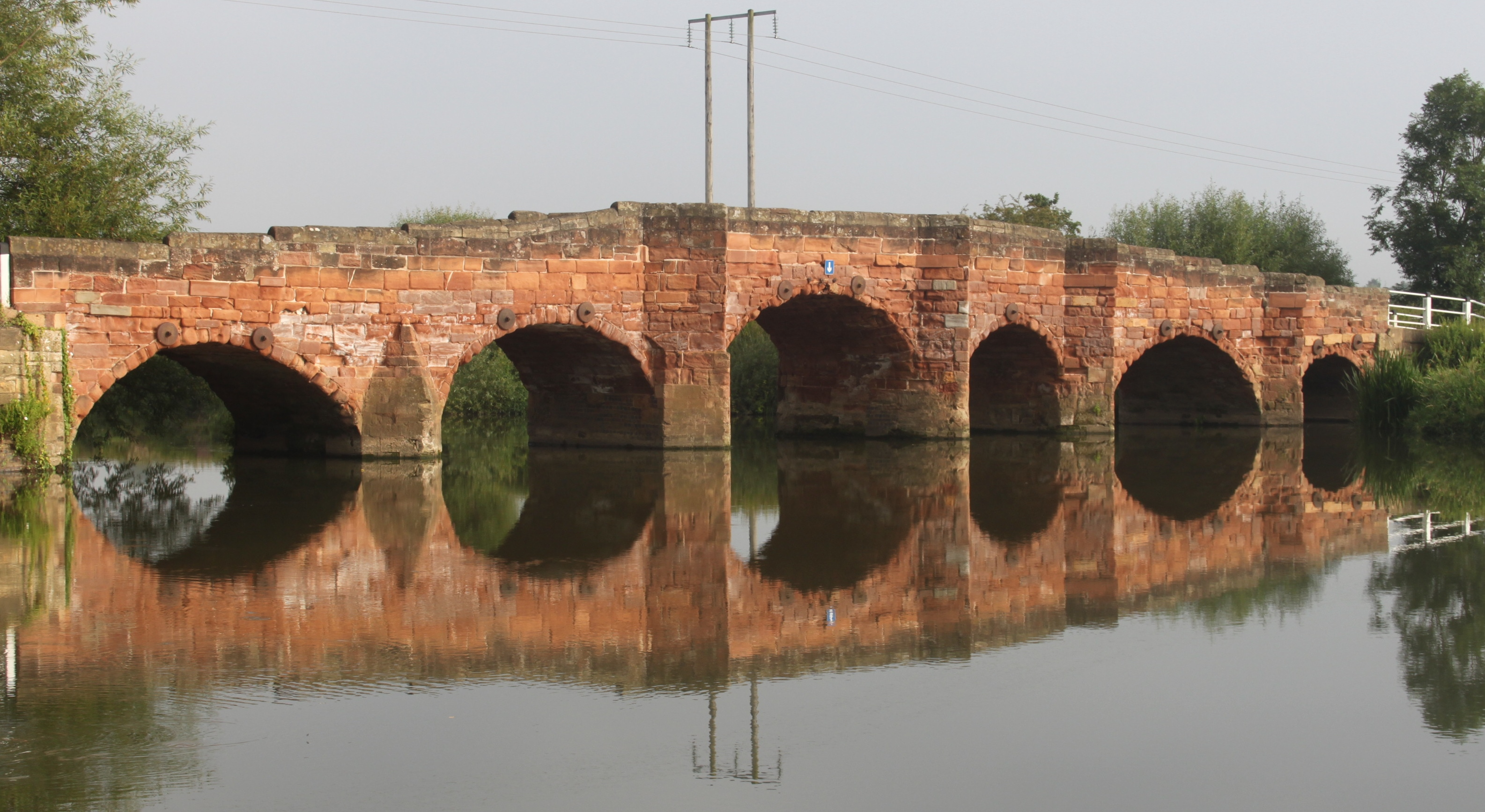
- Coordinates: 52°04′45″N 2°06′54″W
- Carries: B4080
- Crosses: River Avon
- Locale: Eckington, Worcestershire, England
- Heritage status: Grade II* listed building

Characteristics
- No. of spans: 5

History
- Construction start: c. 1720

Location
- Interactive map of Eckington Bridge

Eckington Bridge is a stone bridge over the River Avon in Eckington in the English county of Worcestershire. It is a Grade II* listed building and has been scheduled as an ancient monument.

The first bridge at the site was built in 1440, replacing an earlier ferry, but this fell into disrepair and was replaced by the current stone bridge in the 1720s. It consists of six arches built of red sandstone with the piers being protected by cutwaters.

On the northern side of the bridge, slightly downstream, is a World War II pillbox.

During 2011 and 2012 repairs were undertaken by Worcestershire County Council at a cost of £240,000.

Next to the bridge is Eckington Wharf, which is no longer used commercially but provides public moorings, a canoe launching slipway and picnic area.

Aerial video of the bridge and river

The bridge is the subject of a poem by Arthur Quiller-Couch, and a picture from 1929 by Walter J. Phillips.

In 2022 a collision between two cars on the bridge caused damage and a car entered the river. The driver of that car died.
