= All Saints' Church, Spetchley =

Coordinates: 52.1837°N 2.1540°W

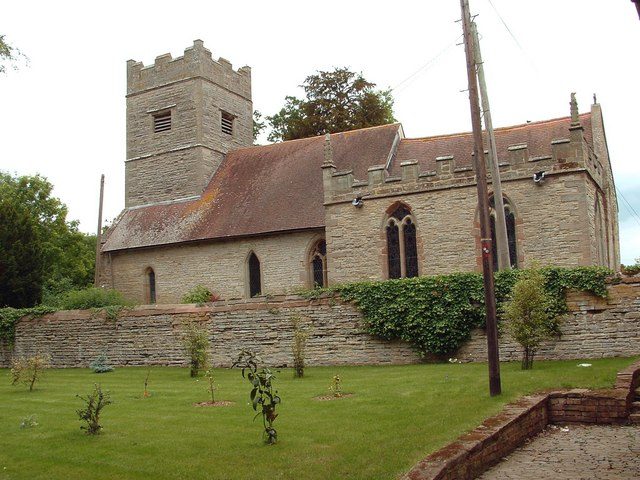
- All Saints Church, Spetchley, from the south

- Location in Worcestershire
- OS grid reference: SO 895 539
- Location: Spetchley Park, Worcestershire
- Country: England
- Denomination: Anglican
- Website: Churches Conservation Trust

Architecture
- Functional status: Redundant
- Heritage designation: Grade II*
- Designated: 11 February 1965
- Architect: Henry Rowe (restoration)
- Architectural type: Church
- Style: Gothic
- Groundbreaking: 14th century
- Completed: 18th century

Specifications
- Materials: Grey lias stone with red sandstone dressings, tiled roofs

All Saints' Church, Spetchley, is a redundant Anglican church adjacent to Spetchley Park, Worcestershire, England. It is recorded in the National Heritage List for England as a designated Grade II* listed building, and is under the care of the Churches Conservation Trust.

== History ==
Although the church has a 13th-century origin, the oldest fabric still surviving in it is from the 14th century, namely the nave and the chancel. In 1614 the south chapel was added by Rowland Berkeley, a Worcester wool merchant and the owner of the nearby hall. The tower probably dates from the 17th century, and the porch was added during the following century. In 1857 a restoration was carried out by Henry Rowe. The church has been vested with the Churches Conservation Trust since 1987.

== Architecture ==
=== Exterior ===
The church is constructed in grey lias stone with red sandstone dressings; its roofs are tiled. The plan of the church consists of a nave, and a lower and narrower chancel, with a chapel to the south of the chancel. At the west end of the church is a tower, which is embraced by the nave, and to the west of that is a porch. The porch is timber-framed, and it stands on a small brick wall. Above it is a two-light west window. The tower is in two stages above the nave roof. The top stage contains small square-headed louvred bell openings on each side, and it has an embattled parapet. In the south wall of the nave is a doorway with a window to the left. To the right of the door are a single-light and a two-light window, both with Decorated tracery. The north wall is correspondingly similar. In the chancel is a three-light Perpendicular-style east window dating from the 19th century. In the north wall of the chancel is a four-light mullioned and transomed bay window dating from the late 16th century, and a single-light window. The south chapel has an embattled parapet with pinnacles. In its west wall is a Tudor doorway, the south wall has two two-light windows, and in the east wall is a three-light window.

=== Interior ===
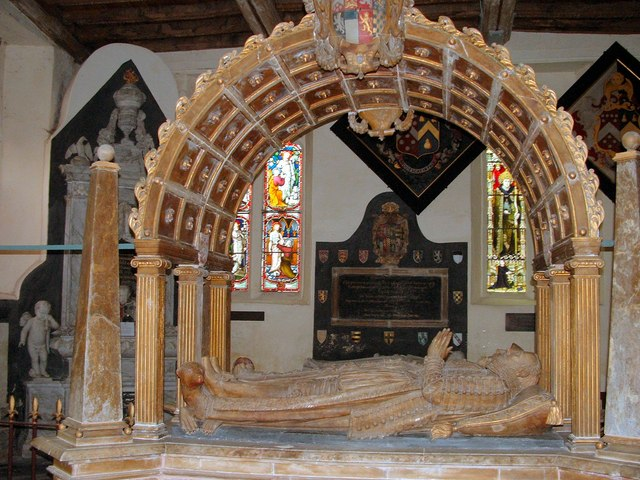
Monument of Sir Rowland Berkeley and his wife Katherine

Both the nave and the chancel have plastered barrel roofs. The font consists of a round bowl on a round stem. The benches date from the 19th century and are carved with poppyheads. The pulpit is from the same period, it is polygonal and painted blue. The reredos is also from the 19th century, and hidden behind it are wall paintings from the 16th–17th century. The major features of the interior are the monuments. In the bay window of the chancel is a tomb chest behind railings dating from the late 16th century. It was intended for John Slade who died in 1597, but he was buried elsewhere. The space between the chancel and the chapel is occupied by a large monument to Sir Rowland Berkeley, who died in 1611, and his wife Katherine. It was possibly designed by Samuel Baldwin, and consists of two effigies on a tomb chest. At its corners are diagonally-set obelisks. The effigies lie under a coffered arch, carried on fluted Ionic columns, and at the top of the arch on both sides is an achievement. To the east and west of the monument are gates and railings that divide the chancel from the chapel.

Within the chapel is the tomb chest of Sir Robert Berkeley, who died in 1656; the chest carries an effigy in judge's robes, and also has an achievement. On the wall is a monument, attributed to James Hardy, to the memory of Thomas Berkeley who died in 1693, and his wife Anne, who had died in the previous year. There is a Baroque monument attributed to Grinling Gibbons to the memory of Robert Berkeley who died in 1694, and a wall monument with a sarcophagus, made by W. Stephens and Company, to another Robert Berkeley who died in 1804. On the walls there are three 19th-century hatchments, and in the chancel are 17th-century brass plaques in the floor, and 18th-century grave slabs. All the stained glass in the church dates from the 19th century and was made by Hardman & Co. The east window of the chapel depicts the Resurrection, the southeast window the risen Christ, and the southeast window contains figures of the Saints Robert and Catherine. In the north window of the chancel is a depiction of the Annunciation. There is a ring of four bells, all dating from the 15th century.

== External features ==
The churchyard wall, which bears the dates 1629 and 1714, is designated as a Grade II listed building.

== See also ==
- List of churches preserved by the Churches Conservation Trust in the English Midlands
