= John Noake =

English journalist and antiquary

John Noake (1816–1894) was an English journalist and antiquary, known for his writings on Worcestershire.

== Life ==
The son of Thomas and Ann Noake, he was born at Sherborne, Dorset on 29 November 1816. He came to Worcester in 1838 to work on Berrow's Worcester Journal and lived in the city for the rest of his life.

Noake later worked on the Worcestershire Chronicle, and his last appointment was as sub-editor of the Worcester Herald. Around 1874 he concentrated on local affairs. He was in turn sheriff (1878), mayor and alderman (1879), and magistrate (1882) for Worcester; as mayor he reopened the old Guildhall, which had been restored and enlarged. For many years he was one of the honorary secretaries of the Worcester Diocesan Architectural and Archæological Society.

Noake died at Worcester on 12 September 1894 and was buried at the cemetery in Astwood Road on 15 September.

== Works ==
All Noake's works related to Worcestershire. He found documents in a chest in the tower of St. Swithin's Church, Worcester that shed light on the history of the city. He published:

- The Rambler in Worcestershire; or Stray Notes on Churches and Congregations, 1848; similar volumes in 1851 and 1854.
- Worcester in Olden Times, 1849.
- The Consecration of St. Mary's Church, Abberley, Worcestershire, July 27, 1852, 1852.
- Notes and Queries for Worcestershire, 1856.
- Worcester sects, or, A history of the Roman Catholics and dissenters of Worcester, London: Longman, 1861, OL 7044254M
- The Monastery and Cathedral of Worcester, 1866.
- Guide to Worcestershire, 1868.
- Worcestershire Relics, 1877.
- Worcestershire Nuggets, by an old Digger, 1889.

Noake also contributed to the Transactions of the Worcester Architectural and Archæological Society, and of the Associated Architectural Societies.

== Family ==
Noake married, first, Miss Woodyatt of Ashperton, Herefordshire, by whom he had a son Charles, and a daughter who became Mrs. Badham; secondly, Miss Brown of Shrewsbury; thirdly, in 1873, Mrs. Stephens (died 1893), widow of a Worcester merchant.

== Notes ==
Attribution

This article incorporates text from a publication now in the public domain: Lee, Sidney, ed. (1895). "Noake, John". Dictionary of National Biography. Vol. 41. London: Smith, Elder & Co.
