= Cotheridge =

Village in Worcestershire, England

Coordinates: 52.1936°N 2.3145°W

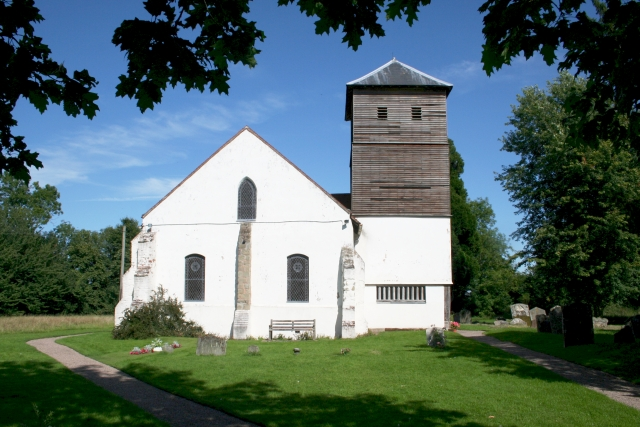
- St. Leonard's Church

- Location within Worcestershire
- Population: 269 (2021 census)
- District: Malvern Hills
- Shire county: Worcestershire
- Region: West Midlands
- Country: England
- Sovereign state: United Kingdom
- Post town: Worcester
- Postcode district: WR6
- Police: West Mercia
- Fire: Hereford and Worcester
- Ambulance: West Midlands
- UK Parliament: West Worcestershire

Cotheridge is a village and civil parish in the district of Malvern Hills in the county of Worcestershire, England. It is 4 miles (6 km) west of the city of Worcester and a mile north-east of the Leigh Court railway station on the Great Western Railway on the opposite side of the River Teme.
The River Teme flows on the southern and south-western part of the village where the land is low-lying and is susceptible to flooding. The soil content is loam and clay with the subsoil being Keuper Marl.

The village is small with most of its residents being widespread. It is noted for its 12th century St. Leonard's Church and manor house. There have been many variations of the name over the centuries including Coddanhrycce (10th century); Codderycce, Koderie, and Codrie (11th century); Kodere, Coddarycge (12th century); Codrigg, Coderigge, Codrugge (13th century); Coterugge (14th century); Coderych, Coderiche (15/16th centuries); Cotheridge, Cowtrige, Cowderidge (17th century).

== History ==
The name Cotheridge derives from the Old English Coddahrycg meaning 'Codda's ridge'.

At the time of the Domesday Book it was known as Codrie. In 1086 it was mentioned as having a church, a mill, and a timber-framed court. The mill descended with the manor until the 16th century.

The manor house known as Cotheridge Court which dates back to at least the 16th century stands at the south-western part of the village. The 12th-century church of St. Leonard's stands not very far away, and is to this day a visitors centre.

Cotheridge was in the upper division of Doddingtree Hundred.

Following the Poor Law Amendment Act 1834 Cotheridge Parish ceased to be responsible for maintaining the poor in its parish. This responsibility was transferred to Martley Poor Law Union.

=== Agriculture ===
In 1304 there were two vineyards belonging to the manor. In the late 19th century the chief crops were wheat, beans, and hops with some land used for pasture.
