= Spetchley Park =

English country mansion and garden

Coordinates: 52.182596°N 2.152076°W

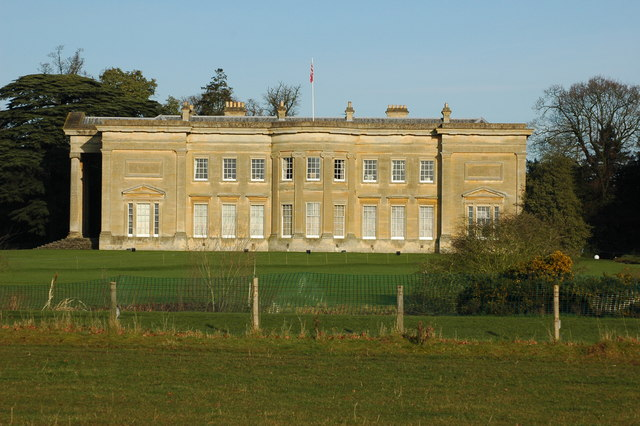
Spetchley Park.

Spetchley Park is a country mansion standing in 4500 acres of gardens and parkland in the hamlet of Spetchley, near Worcester, England. The house and park are separately Grade II* listed.

The house is built in two storeys of Bath stone with a large tetrastyle Ionic portico entrance. Within the house is a Roman Catholic chapel. The estate has belonged to the Berkeley family, who also own Berkeley Castle in Gloucestershire, since it was first built in 1606.

== History ==
The Spetchley estate, once owned by the Sheldon and Lyttleton families, was bought in 1605 by Rowland Berkeley, a wool merchant and banker. His original Tudor house on the site was burned down on the eve of the battle of Worcester, 1651, by disgruntled drunken Scottish Presbyterian Royalists to prevent Oliver Cromwell from using the house for his headquarters. All that remains of the Tudor house today is part of the moat.

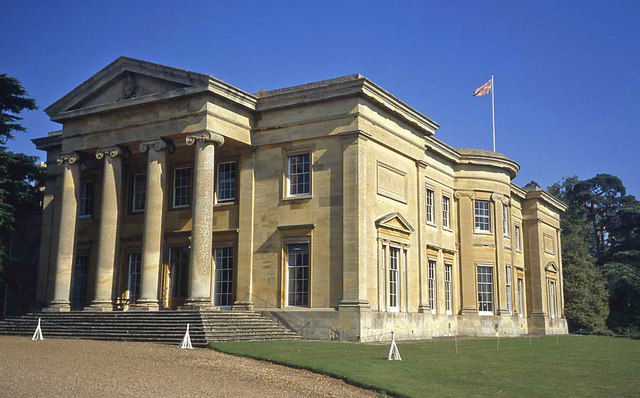
Entrance portico

After the fire Robert Berkeley, Rowland's son and a High Court judge, converted the stables into living accommodations. The present Palladian house was built in 1811 by a descendant, Robert Berkeley (1764–1845), to designs by the Catholic architect John Tasker. The gardens and park were then developed over the years, most notably by Ellen Willmott, the sister of Rose Berkeley, in the late 19th and early 20th centuries.

Today in the garden at Spetchley very little has changed since Ellen Willmott's day. It is a garden of contrasts: there are walled gardens, a melon yard with its original glasshouses, a horse pool, Victorian conservatory, a delightful Root house, statues, fountains, architectural follies, rose gardens, lakes and bridges, superb herbaceous borders and magnificent specimen trees. As of 2023, the 30 acres were open (for a fee) to the public between April and November.

A famous regular visitor to Spetchley was the composer Edward Elgar, who had gone to a Catholic school on the estate and in later years stayed at Spetchley many times, living in the Garden Cottage. The pine trees nearby are called "Elgar's Pines" and according to his inscription for his hosts in their copy of the score, they inspired him to write parts of The Dream of Gerontius.

In 1940, during World War II, Spetchley was earmarked to be used by Winston Churchill and the Cabinet in the event of London becoming too dangerous during the Blitz, or a successful invasion by the Germans and the subsequent loss of London. After the Battle of Britain, Spetchley was instead used by the USAAF 8th Air Force as a place of recuperation for its pilots – a basketball court was put up on the front lawn.

In 2019, 750 items of the home's contents were listed for sale by auction by the new owner, Henry Berkely who had inherited the property two years earlier. The sale was intended to provide funding for the necessary renovations. Some four years later, Country Life (magazine) detailed the recent improvements, illustrated with updated photographs of the home's interior.

== See also ==
- All Saints Church, Spetchley
