= Spetchley =

Hamlet in England

Coordinates: 52.175°N 2.162°W

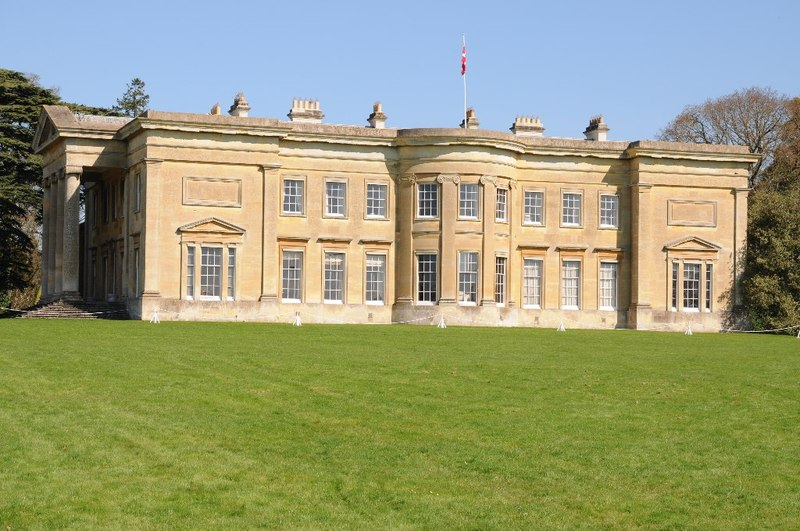
- Spetchley Hall in 2015

- Location within Worcestershire
- Population: 117 (2021)
- OS grid reference: SO896540
- District: Wychavon
- Shire county: Worcestershire
- Region: West Midlands
- Country: England
- Sovereign state: United Kingdom
- Post town: WORCESTER
- Postcode district: WR5
- Police: West Mercia
- Fire: Hereford and Worcester
- Ambulance: West Midlands
- UK Parliament: Droitwich and Evesham

Spetchley is a hamlet and civil parish in Worcestershire, England, that lies in the district of Wychavon, half a mile from Worcester, along the A44 road. Spetchley contains Spetchley Park, a country mansion with extensive gardens. It had a population of 117 in 2021.

== History ==
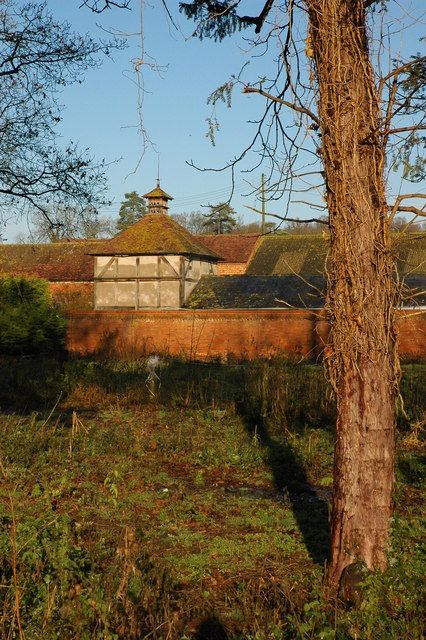
Dovecote at Home Farm, Spetchley

The name Spetchley derives from the Old English spēclēah meaning 'speech wood/clearing', i.e. a place where speeches were made at local assembly meetings.

The Spetchley estate, once owned by the Sheldon and Lyttleton families, was bought in 1605 by Rowland Berkeley, a wool merchant and banker. His original Tudor house on the site was burned down on the eve of the battle of Worcester, 1651, by disgruntled drunken Scottish Presbyterian Royalists to prevent Oliver Cromwell from using the house for his headquarters. All that remains of the Tudor house today is part of the moat.

=== Spetchley railway station ===
This hamlet was the location for the first Railway Station for Worcester city. The station was built by the Birmingham and Gloucester Railway. The station opened on 24 June 1840 but closed for passengers on 1 October 1855 and goods 2 January 1961. The passengers were conveyed by coach from The Crown Inn, Worcester for a fare, inclusive of the train, being met by the Company.
