= George Coventry =

George Coventry may refer to:

- George Coventry, 3rd Baron Coventry (1628–1680), English nobleman
- George Coventry, 6th Earl of Coventry (1722–1809), British peer and Tory politician
- George Coventry, 7th Earl of Coventry (1758–1831), British peer and member of parliament
- George Coventry, 8th Earl of Coventry (1784–1843), British peer and Tory politician
- George Coventry, 9th Earl of Coventry (1838–1930), British politician
- George Coventry, 10th Earl of Coventry (1900–1940), Earl of Coventry
- George William Coventry, 11th Earl of Coventry (1934–2002), British peer and politician
- George Coventry, 13th Earl of Coventry (born 1939), English peer
- George Coventry (minister) (1791–1872), Scottish minister and amateur scientist
