= Menteath =

Menteath is a surname. Notable people with the surname include:

- Stuart Menteath (1853–1916), New Zealand politician
- Charles Granville Stuart Menteath (1769–1847), Scottish advocate and landowner
- James Menteath (c.1718–1802), Scottish cleric
- James Stuart Menteath (1792–1870), Scottish advocate and amateur geologist
