= Abberton Hall =

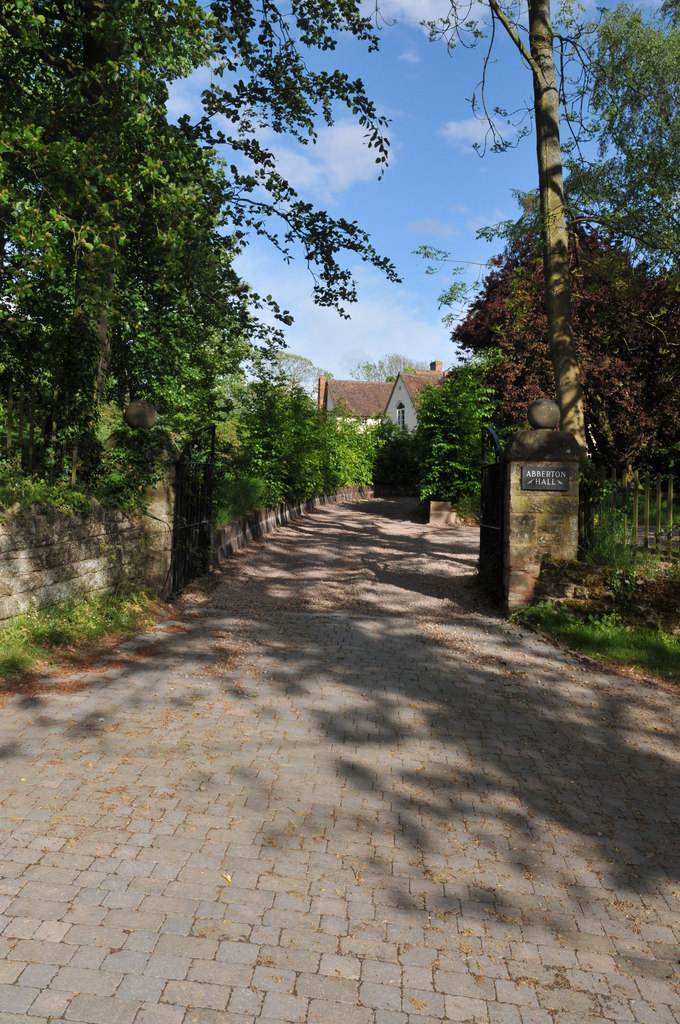
- Entrance to Abberton Hall
- Interactive map of the Abberton Hall area

General information
- Type: House
- Location: Abberton, England
- Coordinates: 52°10′43″N 2°00′34″W

Technical details
- Floor count: 2

Abberton Hall is a small country house in the village of Abberton, Worcestershire, England, near Pershore.

== History ==
It is an irregular two-story house, faced with modern brick, with at its core the timber-framed house of the Sheldon family, with a brick facade and a massive stone chimneybreast (dated 1619). Abberton Hall was the seat of William Laslett, Member of Parliament (MP) for Worcester. This was also the home of Benjamin Gibbon (born 1914), who created murals in the garden loggia, dated to 1937.
