= James Stuart Menteath =

Scottish advocate and geologist

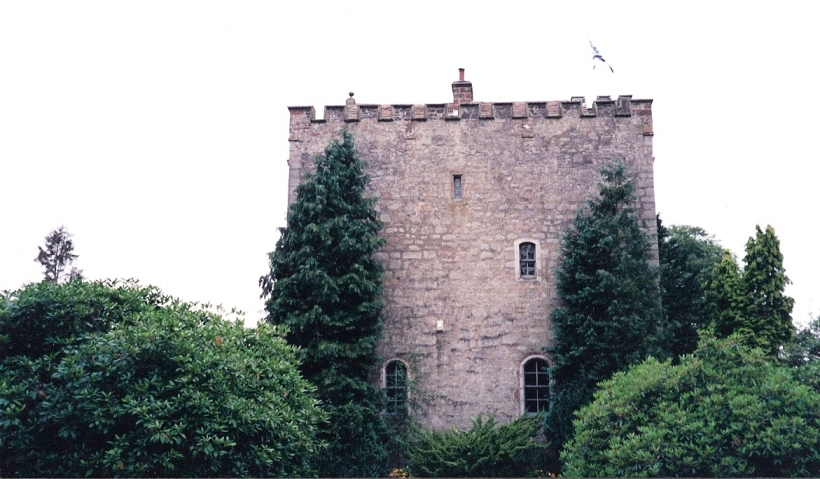
Closeburn Castle

Sir James Stuart Menteath of Closeburn and Mansfield FRSE DL (1792–1870) was a Scottish advocate and eminent amateur geologist.

== Life ==
He was born at Closeburn Castle in 1792 the son of Sir Charles Granville Stuart Menteath and Ludivina Loughnan. He was educated at Rugby School. He trained as an advocate in 1816 and then studied as a barrister-at-law and served at the Middle Temple in London.

In 1837, he was elected a Fellow of the Royal Society of Edinburgh for his contributions to geology. His proposer was Patrick Neill.

He served as the Deputy Lieutenant of Dumfriesshire. He also had business interests in the limestone deposits of New Cumnock.

He was created a baronet on the death of his father in 1847.

He died on 27 February 1870 at Mansfield House in Ayrshire.

== Family ==
He was grandson of his namesake Rev James Menteath.

In 1846 he married Jane Bailey, daughter of Sir Joseph Bailey, 1st Baronet. They had no children.

The baronetcy passed to his nephew, James Stuart Menteath of the 17th Lancers.

== Publications ==
- A Geology of the Snowdon Range
- The Geology of Nithsdale (1828)
