= Edmund Wigley =

British politician

Edmund Meysey Wigley (1758 – 9 September 1821), called Edmund Wigley until 1811, was a British lawyer and politician, who served as Member of Parliament for Worcester.

== Biography ==
Edmund Wigley was the son of Rev. Henry Wigley and his wife Mary, daughter of Edward Ludlam, alderman of Leicester. Although ordained, Henry was vicar of Scraptoft, Leicestershire only until 1767, retiring before he turned 40; he was also lord of the manors of Ullesthorpe, Leicestershire (from his father) and Pensham, Worcestershire (from his mother).

Wigley entered the Middle Temple in 1776, and was called to the bar in 1788.

He worked as a lawyer on the Oxford circuit, and served as Recorder of Leicester 1787–1798.

In 1788, William Ward MP succeeded to the peerage as Viscount Dudley. In the ensuing by-election at Worcester, on 4 March 1789, Wigley was elected unopposed. The independent freemen of Worcester supported him as a respectable local man, and guaranteed his expenses. He would be re-elected in 1790 (heading the poll) and 1796 (unopposed). He opposed the Impeachment of Warren Hastings, speaking several times against it, and as a member of the committee reviewing the impeachment, dissented against the committee's favourable report. He repeatedly opposed the government's tax measures, in line with the wishes of his middle-class constituents. He opposed the union with Ireland.

Wigley was unexpectedly defeated by a third candidate in 1802. He had relied on local support, and had not kept a promise to treat his supporters to a feast after the previous election. His friends thought the defeat was "effected by prejudices as groundless and unfounded as derogatory to the general character of the inhabitants of this city".

== Family ==
On 24 September 1795, Edmund Wigley married Anna Maria Meysey, daughter of Charles Watkins Meysey and Anna Maria Meysey. They had five children:

- Anna Maria (1797–1884), married 1825 John Michael Severne (parents of John Edmund Severne MP)
- Edmund (1798–1833), lieutenant-colonel of the Enniskillen Dragoons, adopted the additional surname Greswolde
- Caroline (1801–1873), author, married 1840 Rev. Archer Clive
- Mary Charlotte (1802–1878), married 1834 Charles Wicksted né Tollett
- Charles Meysey (1803–1830), clergyman (Note: His ghost is said to haunt Malvern Hall, Solihull)

Wigley's father-in-law Charles Watkins Meysey was born Charles Watkins, son of Rev. Richard Watkins and Anne Meysey; he assumed the name Meysey on inheriting the Meysey family estate of Shakenhurst near Bayton, Worcestershire in 1764, and married his cousin Anna Maria Meysey. Anna Maria (their daughter) inherited Shakenhurst on Watkins' death in 1777. As his father-in-law had done, Wigley adopted the additional name Meysey, by Act of Parliament on 15 June 1811.

== Notes ==
Parliament of Great Britain
Preceded by William Ward; Samuel Smith	Member of Parliament for Worcester; 1789–1801; With: Samuel Smith 1789–1790; Edmund Lechmere 1790–1796; Abraham Robarts 1796–1801	Succeeded by themselves
Parliament of the United Kingdom
Preceded by themselves	Member of Parliament for Worcester; 1801–1802; With: Abraham Robarts	Succeeded by Abraham Robarts; Joseph Scott
