= Abraham Robarts =

Abraham Robarts may refer to:

- Abraham Wildey Robarts, MP
- Abraham Robarts (MP for Worcester)
