= Sir Joseph Bailey, 1st Baronet =

English parliamentarian

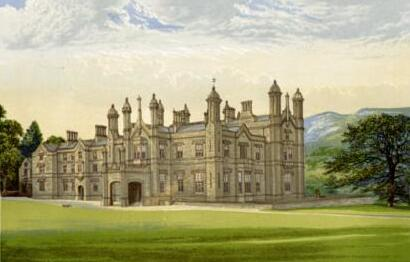
Glanusk Park

Sir Joseph Bailey, 1st Baronet (21 January 1783 – 20 November 1858), was an English ironmaster and Conservative Party Member of Parliament (MP).

== Background ==
Bailey was born in 1783 in Great Wenham, Suffolk, the son of John Bailey, of Wakefield, and his wife Susannah. His parents had moved from Normanton, near Wakefield, in around 1780, by which time they had already had at least three children (Ann, Elizabeth and William). Joseph was the second child of a further five children to be born in Great Wenham (the others being an older sister, Susan, and three younger siblings, John, Thomas and Crawshay).

== Political career ==
He was involved in the iron industry in South Wales and served as High Sheriff of Monmouthshire for 1823–1824. He also represented Worcester in the House of Commons from 1835 to 1847 and Breconshire from 1847 to 1858. In 1852 he was created a Baronet, of Glanusk Park estate in the County of Brecon.

== Family ==
Bailey married, firstly, Maria Latham, daughter of Joseph Latham, in 1810. They had eight children, of which the eldest son, Joseph, served as an MP for Sudbury. Their daughter Jane married James Stuart Menteath, 2nd Baronet of Closeburn and Mansfield.

In about 1826 he bought Glanusk Park and had a mansion house built there.

After his first wife's death in 1827 he married, secondly, Mary Anne Hopper, daughter of John Thomas Henry Hopper, in 1830. They had a daughter, Mary Anne Bertha, who married Alexander Young Spearman, son of Sir Alexander Spearman, 1st Baronet.

== Death ==
Sir Joseph died in November 1858, aged 75. As his eldest son had predeceased him in 1850, he was succeeded in his title by a grandson, Joseph Russell Bailey, who in 1899 was elevated to the peerage as Baron Glanusk. Lady Bailey died in 1874.

== Arms ==
Coat of arms of Sir Joseph Bailey, 1st Baronet
Crest A griffin, sejant, argent, semee of annulets, gules. Escutcheon Argent, between two bars, three annulets in fesse gules, between as many martlets of the last. Motto Libertas (Liberty)

Parliament of the United Kingdom
Preceded by Thomas Henry Hastings Davies; George Richard Robinson	Member of Parliament for Worcester; 1835–1847; With: George Richard Robinson 1835–1837; Thomas Henry Hastings Davies 1837–1841; Thomas Wilde 1841–1846; Sir Denis Le Marchant, Bt 1846–1847	Succeeded by Osman Ricardo; Francis Rufford
Preceded by Thomas Wood	Member of Parliament for Breconshire; 1847–1858	Succeeded by Godfrey Morgan
Baronetage of the United Kingdom
New creation	Baronet of Glanusk Park; 1852–1858	Succeeded by Joseph Bailey
