= Edmund Lechmere =

Edmund Lechmere may refer to:

- Edmund Lechmere (MP for Worcestershire) (1710–1805), MP for Worcestershire
- Edmund Lechmere (MP for Worcester) (1747–1798), MP for Worcester (son of the above)
- Sir Edmund Lechmere, 2nd Baronet (1792–1856)
- Sir Edmund Lechmere, 3rd Baronet (1826–1894), Conservative MP
- Sir Edmund Lechmere, 4th Baronet (1865–1937)
