= Charles Granville Stuart Menteath =

Scottish advocate and landowner

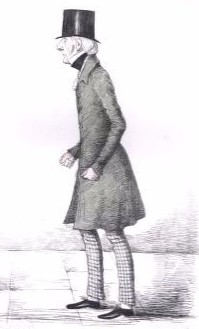
Sir Charles Granvill Stuart-Menteth, 1st Baronet, 1847 engraving

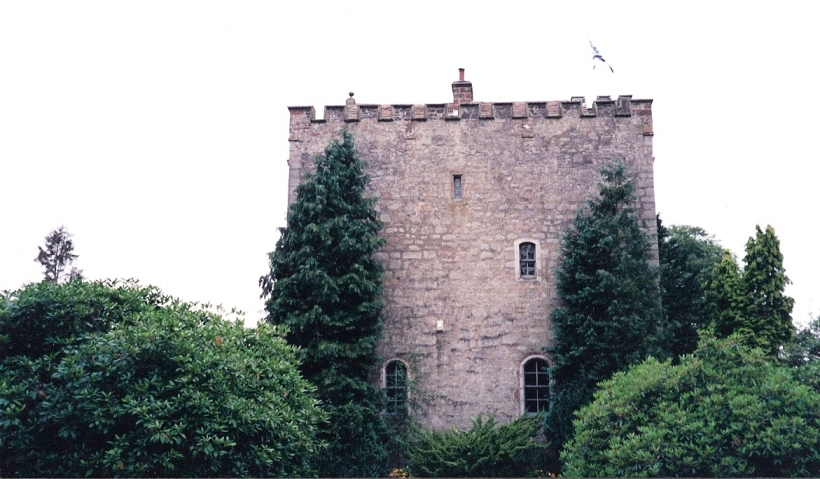
Closeburn Castle

Sir Charles Granville Stuart Menteath, 1st Baronet of Closeburn and Mansfield, FRSE FSA (1769–1847) was a Scottish advocate and landowner.

== Life ==
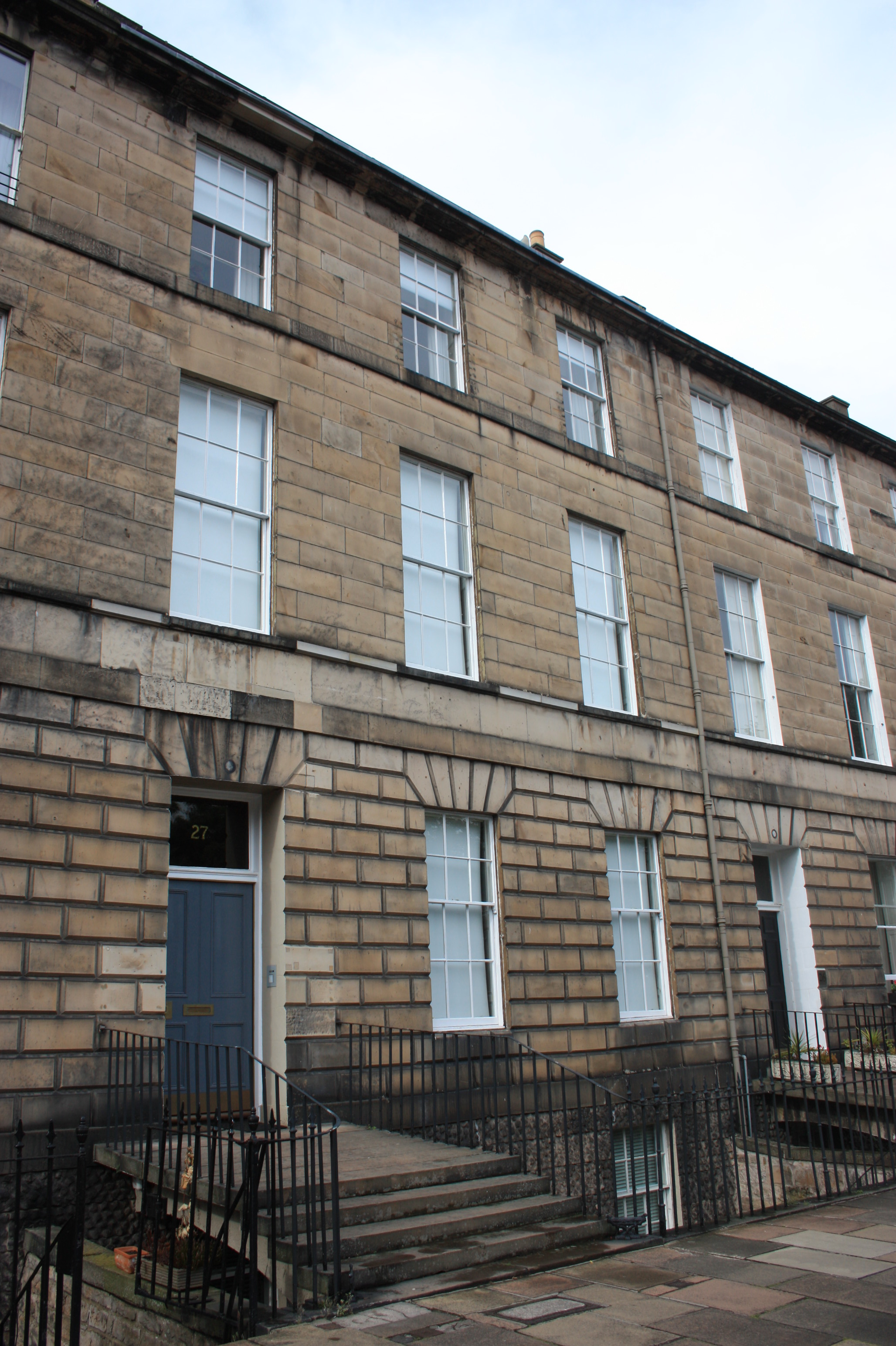
27 Abercromby Place, Edinburgh

He was born at Closeburn Castle on 15 May 1769, the son of Rev James Stuart Menteath and Catherine Maria Wheler, daughter of Rev Granville Wheler. He trained as a lawyer and qualified as an advocate in 1794.

In 1815 Menteath was elected a Fellow of the Royal Society of Edinburgh. His proposers were John Leslie, John Playfair, and Robert Jameson.

He was created a baronet on 11 August 1838. In later years he spent much time at his townhouse at 27 Abercromby Place in Edinburgh's Second New Town.

== Death ==
Menteath died on 3 December 1847.

== Family ==
In 1791, he married Ludivina Loughnan (d. 1859). Their six children included Sir James Stuart Menteath FRSE.

His daughter, Philadelphia Stuart Menteath, married John Francis Miller-Erskine, the Earl of Mar and Kellie, maternal grandson of Patrick Miller of Dalswinton.
