= William Duff-Gordon =

Scottish politician

Member of Parliament for Worcester
- In office 1807-1818

Personal details
- Born: 8 April 1772
- Died: 8 March 1823 (aged 50)
- Spouse: Caroline Cornewall (m. 1810)
- Children: 1+, including Alexander
- Parent: Alexander Gordon (father)
- Relatives: William Gordon (grandfather)

Sir William Duff-Gordon, 2nd Baronet (8 April 1772 – 8 March 1823), known as William Gordon until 1815, was a Scottish politician.

== Biography ==
Duff-Gordon was the son of the Hon. Alexander Gordon, Lord Rockville, son of William Gordon, 2nd Earl of Aberdeen; his mother was Anne, daughter of William Duff.

He was returned to Parliament as one of two representatives for Worcester in 1807, a seat he held until 1818. In 1815, he succeeded his uncle Sir James Duff, 1st Baronet, as 2nd Baronet of Halkin according to a special remainder, and assumed the same year by Royal licence the additional surname of Duff.

Duff-Gordon married Caroline Cornewall, youngest daughter of Sir George Cornewall, on 5 February 1810. They had two sons and two daughters.

He died in March 1823, aged 50, and was succeeded in the baronetcy by his son Alexander.

== Notes ==
Parliament of the United Kingdom
Preceded by Abraham Robarts; Henry Bromley	Member of Parliament for Worcester; 1807–1818; With: Abraham Robarts 1807–1816; Viscount Deerhurst 1816–1818	Succeeded by Viscount Deerhurst; Thomas Henry Hastings Davies
Baronetage of the United Kingdom
Preceded by James Duff	Baronet (of Halkin); 1815–1823	Succeeded by Alexander Cornewall Duff-Gordon
