= Thomas Henry Hastings Davies =

British Member of Parliament

Member of Parliament for Worcester
- In office 1837–1841 Serving with Joseph Bailey
- Preceded by: George Richard Robinson; Joseph Bailey
- Succeeded by: Joseph Bailey; Thomas Wilde
- In office 1818–1835 Serving with George Coventry, George Richard Robinson
- Preceded by: William Duff-Gordon; George Coventry
- Succeeded by: George Richard Robinson; Joseph Bailey

Personal details
- Born: 27 January 1789
- Died: 11 December 1846 (aged 57)
- Spouse: Augusta Anne Champion de Crespigny (m. 1824; died 1846)
- Parent(s): Thomas Davies; Anna Baillie
- Education: Royal Military College, Sandhurst

Thomas Henry Hastings Davies (27 January 1789 – 11 December 1846) was a British soldier and Member of Parliament.

== Early life ==
Davies was born on 27 January 1789. He was the eldest son of Thomas Davies, Advocate General to the East India Company in Bengal, and Anna Baillie (a daughter of Hugh Baillie of Monckton). His brother was General Francis John Davies. He succeeded to his father's estate in 1792 and to the estate of his grandfather, Thomas Davies of New House, Herefordshire (who married Mary Warburton), in 1795.

He was educated at the Royal Military College.

== Career ==
He joined the 52nd (Oxfordshire) Regiment of Foot as an ensign, rising to become a captain before, in 1809, he moved to the Grenadier Guards. He served at the Battle of Waterloo, and was made a lieutenant-colonel the same year. He eventually became a colonel in 1837, retiring the same year.

=== Political career ===
In 1816 he purchased Elmley Castle in Worcestershire. At the 1818 UK general election, Davies stood for the Whigs in Worcester, winning the seat. In Parliament, he tended to oppose government spending, and was critical of what he saw as waste in the British Army. He argued for the Army to intervene in support of Spain when French troops invaded in 1823. He supported Catholic emancipation. He supported electoral reform, and introduced a bill which limited polling to eight days, but introduced multiple polling places in larger towns and cities; this was successful.

Davies held the seat repeatedly, but was defeated at the 1835 UK general election. While campaigning in the election, he was thrown from his carriage, and as a result was partly paralysed. He stood again at the 1837 UK general election, regaining the seat without facing an opponent, then he retired at the 1841 UK general election, as the paralysis worsened.

== Personal life ==
On 17 January 1824 Davies was married to Augusta Anne Champion de Crespigny (c. 1800–1892), a daughter of Thomas Champion de Crespigny, MP for Sudbury, and the former Augusta Charlotte Thellusson (a daughter of merchant Peter Thellusson and granddaughter of Genevan banker and diplomat Isaac de Thellusson).

Davies died on 11 December 1846. By his 1841 will, he left all his property to his wife, which further directed that on her death it was to be divided equally between his brothers and executors, Warburton Davies and Francis John Davies (grandfather of Gen. Sir Francis Davies and Maj.-Gen. Henry Rodolph Davies). After his death she married Sir John Pakington, Bt, the Secretary of State for War, in 1851. In 1874 he was made Baron Hampton and Augusta became Baroness Hampton.

Parliament of the United Kingdom
Preceded by William Duff-Gordon; George Coventry	Member of Parliament for Worcester; 1818–1835; With: George Coventry (1818–1826); George Richard Robinson (1826–1835)	Succeeded by George Richard Robinson; Joseph Bailey
Preceded by George Richard Robinson; Joseph Bailey	Member of Parliament for Worcester; 1837–1841; With: Joseph Bailey	Succeeded by Joseph Bailey; Thomas Wilde
