= Richard Padmore =

British politician and industrialist

Member of Parliament for Worcester
- In office 12 March 1860 – 17 November 1868 Serving with Alexander Clunes Sheriff (1865–1868); Osman Ricardo (1860–1865)
- Preceded by: Osman Ricardo; William Laslett
- Succeeded by: Alexander Clunes Sheriff; William Laslett

Personal details
- Born: 1789 Wellington, Shropshire, England
- Died: 12 January 1881 (aged 91)
- Party: Liberal
- Parent(s): Thomas Padmore; Mary Padmore

Richard Padmore (1789 – 12 January 1881) was a British Liberal Party politician and industrialist.

== Industrial career ==
Born in Wellington, Shropshire as the son of Thomas and Mary Padmore, Padmore joined Worcester-based lamppost, tram wire posts and engine supplier Hardy and Co, founded by Robert and John Hardy, in 1820. He became a partner in 1829 and the firm then became known as Hardy and Padmore. This partnership was later dissolved in 1851, with the firm entering voluntary liquidation long after Padmore's death in 1967.

== Political career ==
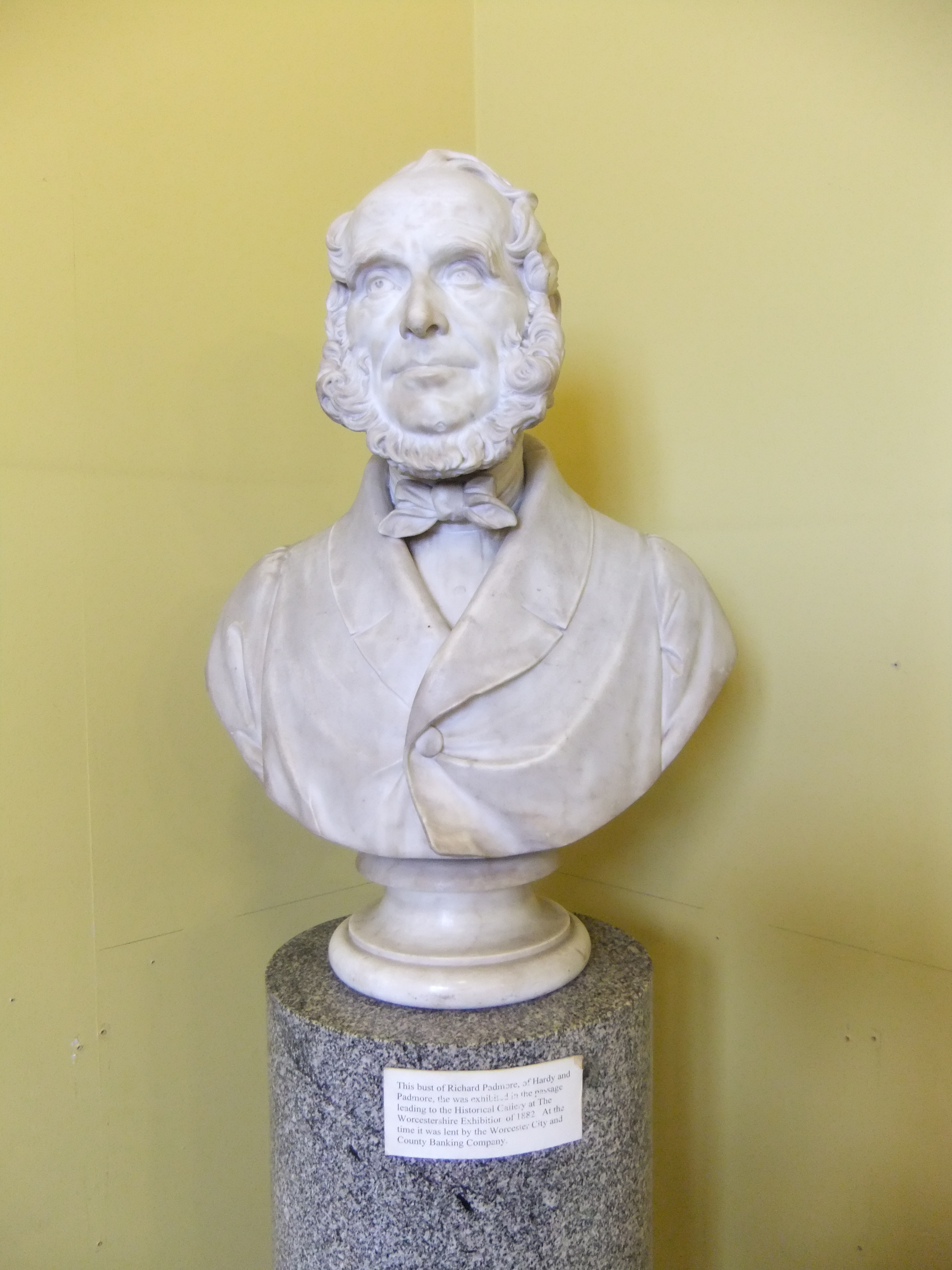
A bust of Richard Padmore at Worcester City Art Gallery and Museum

Padmore was Worcester's first non-conformist mayor—rejecting a procession to the cathedral or his place of worship and refusing to wear a mayoral robe—from 1849 to 1849, and from 1852 to 1853 before being elected Liberal MP for Worcester at a by-election in 1860—caused by the resignation of William Laslett. He held the seat until 1868 when he did not seek re-election.

Parliament of the United Kingdom
Preceded by Osman Ricardo; William Laslett	Member of Parliament for Worcester; 1860–1868; With: Alexander Clunes Sheriff (1865–1868); Osman Ricardo (1860–1865)	Succeeded by Alexander Clunes Sheriff; William Laslett
