= Alexander Clunes Sheriff =

English businessman and politician

Alexander Clunes Sheriff (1816 – 17 March 1878) was an English businessman and Liberal Party politician who was active in local government and sat in the House of Commons from 1865 to his death in 1878.

Sheriff was the son of A. Sherriff. He was chairman of the Worcester Royal Porcelain Co. and the Worcester Engine Works, and had directorships of the Worcester City and County Banking Co., the Patent Shaft and Axletree Co., the Metropolitan Railway, the District Railway and the Metropolitan and St John's Wood Railway. He was an Alderman of Worcester and was sheriff and twice mayor of the city. He was also J.P. for Worcester

At the 1865 general election Sheriff was elected Member of Parliament (MP) for Worcester. He held the seat until his death aged 61 in 1878.

Sheriff married Martha Tattersall, daughter of Thomas Tattersall of Armley, near Leeds in 1841.

Parliament of the United Kingdom
| Preceded by Osman Ricardo; Richard Padmore | Member of Parliament for Worcester; 1865 – 1878; With: Richard Padmore to 1868; William Laslett 1868–1874; Thomas Rowley Hill from 1874 | Succeeded by John Derby Allcroft; Thomas Rowley Hill |
