= George Richard Robinson =

British Peelite and politician

Member of Parliament for Poole
- In office 31 July 1847 – 24 August 1850 Serving with George Philips
- Preceded by: Charles Ponsonby; George Philips
- Succeeded by: Henry Danby Seymour; George Philips

Member of Parliament for Worcester
- In office 16 June 1826 – 22 July 1837 Serving with Joseph Bailey (1835–1837); Thomas Henry Hastings Davies (1826–1835)
- Preceded by: Thomas Henry Hastings Davies; George Coventry
- Succeeded by: Joseph Bailey; Thomas Henry Hastings Davies

Personal details
- Born: c. 1781
- Died: 24 August 1850 (aged 69)
- Resting place: Poole, Dorset, England
- Party: Peelite
- Other political affiliations: Conservative (1841–1847); Whig (until 1841)

George Richard Robinson (c. 1781 – 24 August 1850) was a British Peelite, Conservative and Whig politician.

== Family and early life ==
Born around 1781, Robinson was the son of surgeon and Mayor of Wareham, Dorset, Richard Robinson. He never married, but had at least one illegitimate daughter, presumably with a Miss M. Read, whom The Times reported, in 1827, that he had "eloped with", also describing Read as a "beautiful and accomplished daughter of a wealthy merchant residing at Poole", but no record of their marriage has been found.

At an early age, he joined the family's Newfoundland trade, which was then headed by Benjamin Lester—who was a Member of Parliament (MP) for Poole between 1790 and 1796—and then Lester's son-in-law, George Garland, who was an MP for the same constituency between 1801 and 1806 and was in partnership with his brother, Joseph Garland, a London corn merchant, until 1805.

Following this, Robinson worked in Joseph Garland's London office, before joining Hart, Eppes and Gaden, with whom he went to St. John's to control its operations, becoming a partner of the firm in 1810, when he was joined at the firm by John Bingley Garland, brother of Benjamin Lester Lester, Poole MP between 1809 and 1835. By 1815, the firm was named Hart, Garland and Robinson and was one of the largest in Newfoundland trade. In 1822, upon Hart's retirement, Robinson became the firm's senior partner, and remained head of the firm until his death.

== Political career ==
=== Worcester MP (1826–1837) ===
==== 1826–1830 ====
Robinson first entered Parliament after the 1826 general election as an MP for Worcester. While he claimed to be "independent" and "unconnected with any party", and having the support of non-resident freemen across the country, he is recorded in various works as acting as a Whig—despite, at a dinner, expressing approval of the Tory government headed by Robert Jenkinson, 2nd Earl of Liverpool. At the same dinner, he "eulogised" the Tory Foreign Secretary George Canning.

He attended parliament regularly, and campaigned for tariff reforms, represented shipping interests and North American colonies, and advocated Newfoundland's claim to an independent legislative assembly. The latter was established and Robinson's partner, John Bingley Garland, served as the first speaker in 1833.

In Parliament, Robinson denounced "fraudulent schemes" of joint-stock companies, voted against the Duke of Clarence's grant, for Catholic emancipation, for revision of the Corn Laws, and against increased protection for barley. He also advocated inquiries into electoral interference by the Leicester corporation, and Irish estimates, and seconded Thomas Davies' successful motion for the appointment of a select committee on polling—although he later rebuked Davies' suggestions of limiting the duration of polls and providing multiple booths, fearing this would "abridge the freedom of election", presenting a hostile petition from Worcester.

He also moved an amendment to extend the poll to 10 days in length in order to accommodate out-voters, and threatened to "take advantage of the forms of the House" to stop the progress of reform bills, although this failed. He advocated an inquiry into the Devon and Cornwall Mining Company, and for the disfranchisement of Penryn.

Robinson presented numerous petitions for the repeal of the Test Acts, and voted in this way in the House of Commons, and secured accounts of government expenses in Newfoundland, calling for a "small naval force" to protect the area's fishing fleet. On free trade, Robinson was initially favourable to the "principle" of it, but not unless "something like reciprocity" had been established—and defended the notion of tariff retaliation against the United States in 1828. He spoke and voted to reduce the pivot price of corn, supported repeal of the usury laws, and recommended use of private packets in the place of post office steam vessels. He also supported the unification of Upper and Lower Canada and for an inquiry into "unjustifiable expenditure" on military works there.

Throughout the remainder of his Worcester parliamentary career, Robinson presented a number of petitions against distress in the silk industry, and criticised the silk trade bill in 1829—claiming the government "refuse[d] any protection to the manufacturer" but gave "protection to the landed interest". He dissented from anti-Catholic petitions from his constituency, and declared his approval of the Wellington–Peel ministry's concession of emancipation. By this point, he was voting steadily with the Whigs, and was campaigning heavily for tax reductions particularly on those which "press most heavily on the industrious classes"—protesting that "scarcely one tax has been removed from the necessities of life, or from the articles which are used by the poor and industrious". He attacked plans to reduce duties on French wine and urged "the introduction of the representative system" to some British colonies.

==== 1830–1831 ====
Robinson against stood for election for Worcester at the 1830 general election, professing support for "every practical reduction in political expenditure" and claiming he had never "mixed myself with any degree of party". He also denied allegations he was an "enemy to the poor". Despite this, he was returned unopposed, and he immediately renewed his campaign for a review of taxation and an "amelioration of the condition of the people", stating that "without inquiry, and without remedy, the state of the country can never be improved". Again, despite being listed as a Whig by reference books, he was noted as a "foe" by the Wellington government, and divided against the party on the civil list in 1830, and made a number of criticisms on issues including stamp duty, slavery, and colonial trade.

He then criticised the Grey ministry's proposals for ambassadorial pensions, condemned its civil list as "monstrous" and giving rise to potential "odium and scandal"—but also approved of much of its Budget, despite still disproving of plans to reduce duties on French wines and foreign timber. He began to advocate a "graduated property tax", which he argued would "have the effect of relieving all branches of protective industry", and voted in favour of the reform bill caveating this action with an insistence that he was not "pledged to any of the details" but had some "approbation of the principle".

==== 1831–1832 ====
Campaigning ahead of the 1831 general election, Robinson mocked those who backed "moderate reform", claiming this was the "greatest bug-bear that ever was attempted to be put upon the people". He declared he was "an opponent of the free trade system... while trade in corn remains shackled". He was then returned unopposed, again, for Worcester.

In Parliament, he "harassed ministers" over the government of Newfoundland and welcomed a commission of inquiry into colonial establishments, also urging for a legislative assembly similar to those in other North American colonies. He again resumed calls for a reform of taxation and against the reduction of French wine duties.

Robinson was a supporter of an Irish poor law, and wished to suppress the introduction of a writ for Liverpool and Pembrokeshire. At the 1831 coronation of William IV, he came with an "enormous nosegay in his hand, which excited much laughter".

He then voted for the second reading of the reintroduced reform bill, but dismissed universal suffrage, dividing at least twice against the notion, while briefly speaking for the overall bill. He got frustrated, however, at interruptions, noting that "we must not, night after night, waste our time in debate on frivolous points". Throughout the debate, defended arrangements for Wareham and Stoke-upon-Trent, against the division of county constituencies, and for the enfranchisement of £50 tenants-at-will. In December 1831, he rejected an anti-reform petition from Worcestershire, and continued to give steady support for reform.

For the remainder of the parliament, in 1832, he continued to demand inquiries into distress, and voted against the vestries bill. He argued against the anatomy bill, warning that legalising the "sale of human bodies" would "facilitate and encourage the commission of murder".

He also called for a modified property tax and inquiries into how the "whole system of taxation can be remodeled" and into glove trade, also presenting petitions on the inquiry into silk trade. He opposed the sale of beer bill and endorsed and presented a hostile petition on the matter. He continued to support representative reforms in Newfoundland and New South Wales.

==== 1832–1847 ====
Robinson was returned for Worcester once more, as a Whig, at the 1832 general election, and continued to press for tax reforms before retiring at the 1837 general election. In 1841, he stood unsuccessfully as a Conservative at Tower Hamlets, before being elected a Peelite member for Poole in 1847, holding the seat until his death in 1850.

== Appointments ==
In 1828 Robinson was appointed Chairman of Lloyd's of London and "helped Lloyd's to recover its prestige over the next decade and a half".

== Death ==
Upon his death, dated 24 August 1850, he directed all of his interest in Newfoundland should be sold for his daughter, who was then living in Paris, and her children. He left annuities of £500 to Thomas Brooking, his business partner, £100 to George Thomas Brooking, his godson, and £200 to his Ellen Garland, his goddaughter. A further £7,000 was to be invested to provide for the poor of Wareham, and his remains were interred at Poole in the same vault as his mother and sister.

Parliament of the United Kingdom
| Preceded by Thomas Henry Hastings Davies; George Coventry | Member of Parliament for Worcester; 1826–1837; With: Joseph Bailey (1835–1837); Thomas Henry Hastings Davies (1826–1835) | Succeeded by Joseph Bailey; Thomas Henry Hastings Davies |
| Preceded by Charles Ponsonby; George Philips | Member of Parliament for Poole; 1847–1850; With: George Philips | Succeeded by Henry Danby Seymour; George Philips |
