= Denis Le Marchant =

British civil servant (1795–1874)

- Born: 3 July 1795; Newcastle-upon-Tyne
- Died: 30 October 1874 (aged 79); London
- Occupations: barrister civil servant writer politician
- Spouse: Sarah Eliza Smith (m. 1835)
- Children: 4
- Parents: John Le Marchant (father); Mary née Carey (mother)
- Relatives: Carey Le Marchant (older brother); John Le Marchant (younger brother)

Sir Denis Le Marchant, 1st Baronet (3 July 1795 – 30 October 1874) was a British barrister, civil servant, writer and Whig politician.

== Background and education ==
The member of an old Guernsey family, Le Marchant was born at Newcastle-upon-Tyne, the second son of Major-General John Le Marchant and his wife Mary née Carey, eldest daughter of John Carey, of Guernsey. His father was killed at the Battle of Salamanca in 1812, while his elder brother Carey also died in the Peninsular War. His younger brother John Le Marchant became a distinguished colonial administrator. He was educated at High Wycombe Royal Grammar School, Eton and Trinity College, Cambridge, and was called to the Bar, Lincoln's Inn, in 1823.

== Career ==
Le Marchant appeared for the petitioner in the Gardner Peerage Claim and published Proceedings of the House of Lords in the Gardner Peerage Claim in 1828. In 1830 he was appointed principal secretary to Lord Brougham, the Lord Chancellor, on the recommendation of Brougham's brother, William Brougham, who Le Marchant had befriended at Cambridge. He gained distinction during the debates over the Great Reform Act, where he was of great assistance to government ministers. In 1834 he was appointed Clerk of the Crown in Chancery and in the same year he edited a successful pamphlet, The Reform Ministry and the Reform Parliament, to which his close friend Lord Althorp, and also Lord Stanley, Lord Palmerston, and Sir James Graham were contributors. From 1836 to 1841 he was secretary to the Board of Trade and also served briefly as joint secretary to the Treasury in 1841. The latter year he was created a Baronet, of Chobham Place in the County of Surrey.

Le Marchant unsuccessfully contested the Parliamentary seat of Harwich in 1841. In 1846 he was successfully elected to Parliament as one of two representatives for Worcester. In July of the following year, he was made Under-Secretary of State for the Home Department under Lord John Russell. He retired from Parliament the same year but remained Under-Secretary of State for the Home Department until May 1848, when he returned as secretary to the Board of Trade. From 1850 until 1871 he was Clerk of the House of Commons.

Apart from his career in the civil service and politics, Le Marchant published a biography of his father in 1841. He also began a biography of his friend John Spencer, 3rd Earl Spencer, which was finished by his son after his death, and edited Horace Walpole's Memoirs of the Reign of George III (1845).

== Personal life ==
Le Marchant married Sarah Eliza Smith, fourth daughter of Charles Smith, of Sutton, Essex, in 1835. They had two sons and two daughters. Le Marchant died at his London home, 21 Belgrave Place, in October 1874, aged 79, and was succeeded in the baronetcy by his son, Henry. Lady Le Marchant died in 1894.

Parliament of Great Britain
Preceded by Joseph Bailey; Sir Thomas Wilde	Member of Parliament for Worcester; 1846–1847; With: Joseph Bailey	Succeeded by Osman Ricardo; Francis Rufford
Political offices
Preceded by Sir William Somerville, Bt	Under-Secretary of State for the Home Department; 1847–1848	Succeeded by George Cornewall Lewis
Government offices
Preceded by John Henry Ley	Clerk of the House of Commons; 1850–1871	Succeeded by Sir Erskine May
Baronetage of the United Kingdom
New creation	Baronet (of Chobham Place); 1841 – 1874	Succeeded by Henry Denis Le Marchant
