= Edward Coventry, Viscount Deerhurst =

Edward George William Omar Coventry, Viscount Deerhurst, known as Lord Ted Deerhurst (24 September 1957 – 4 October 1997), was a British surfer.

== Life and career ==
Deerhurst was the son of George Coventry, 11th Earl of Coventry and Marie Medart, who divorced in 1963.

Moving to California with his American mother, he attended Lincoln Junior High School in Santa Monica. He learned to surf under the wing of Tony Alva, the skateboarder. Aged 15, he was taken back to England by his father (while his mother was thrown in jail). He represented Great Britain as an amateur at the world championships in South Africa in 1978. His best result was semi-finalist in the José Cuervo classic at big Sunset, Hawaii, in the same year. While he never made the top 100 in the professional rankings, he gained a reputation as "the most persistent and committed performer on the world circuit...a hero of never-say-die optimism."

Deerhurst designed surfboards under the name Excalibur and set up the Excalibur Foundation to enable disabled and underprivileged children to go surfing. He was briefly married to South African born Susan Knight (née Glover.) He died in October 1997, in North Shore, Oahu, Hawaii, at the age of 40 years, predeceasing his father. His death may have come about in the wake of his relationship with a dancer at the Femme Nu club in Honolulu, by the name of Lola. This theory is advanced by (Dr) Andy Martin in his book, Surf, Sweat and Tears: the Epic Life and Mysterious Death of Edward George William Omar Deerhurst.

Deerhurst appeared in the films Storm Riders (1982) and Asian Paradise (1984).
