= William Laslett =

English lawyer, landowner and Member of Parliament

William Emmerson Kendrick Laslett
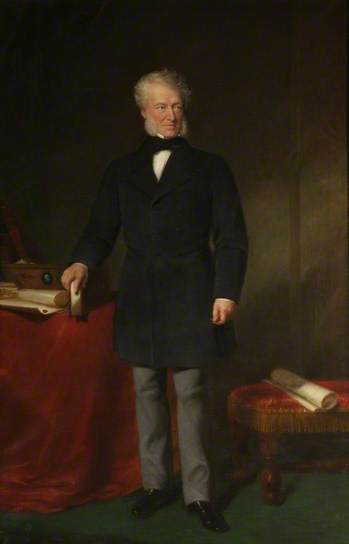
- Born: 1799; Worcester, Worcestershire, England
- Died: 26 January 1884 (aged 84–85); Abberton, Worcestershire, England
- Occupations: Solicitor, Member of Parliament
- Known for: Charitable donations
- Spouse: Maria Carr

William Emmerson Kendrick Laslett (baptised 14 October 1799 – 26 January 1884) was an English lawyer, landowner and Member of Parliament.

== Early life ==
Christened in Worcester on 14 October 1799, he was the eldest son of Thomas Emmerson Laslett (1765-1816), a Worcester banker, and his wife Sophia Jenkins (-1836). After attending RGS Worcester and conducting his initial training in a bank, he qualified as a solicitor and as a barrister and practised law in Worcester. His inheritance and his profits were largely invested in land and by 1829 he had acquired the manor and hall of Abberton, which was his residence for the rest of his life.

== Marriage ==
After the death in 1841 of Robert James Carr, the Bishop of Worcester, which left his eldest daughter Maria Carr (1801-1888) penniless, Laslett offered to marry her and to settle a modest annual income on her. After the wedding at Aldingbourne on 3 February 1842, she went to live with Laslett and his unmarried sister Sophia Laslett (1804-1851) at Abberton Hall. Relations between the three were unsatisfactory and Maria ran away, living in Scotland under an assumed name. In time, Laslett accepted the situation and agreed to a formal separation. Details of this unhappy interlude were used by Ellen Wood in her 1861 novel East Lynne.

== Political career ==
Standing as a Radical Liberal, he was elected unopposed as a Member of Parliament (MP) for Worcester at a by-election in April 1852, and was re-elected at the subsequent general election and in 1857 and 1859. He resigned from the House of Commons on 6 March 1860 through appointment as Steward of the Chiltern Hundreds. He was again elected for the same constituency in 1868, but was defeated in the 1874 election.

== Charitable donations ==
With no immediate family and spending little on personal needs, Laslett gave much of his money in private and public charity. He financed restoration or rebuilding of several churches and bought Worcester's old gaol, which he converted into housing for indigent married couples. As of 2021, charitable trusts that he founded are still operating in Worcester and Hinton on the Green, their income coming from land rents.

== Last days ==
Living alone at Abberton Hall, Laslett died there in 1884. His will was proved on 26 March 1884 with an estate for probate purposes of over 13,000 pounds (equal to about 1.23 million pounds in 2014). One of his executors and his main beneficiary was the Reverend Robert James Baker (1828-1886), his wife's nephew.

Parliament of the United Kingdom
| Preceded by Osman Ricardo and Francis Rufford | Member of Parliament for Worcester; 1852 – 1860; With: Osman Ricardo | Succeeded by Osman Ricardo and Richard Padmore |
| Preceded by Richard Padmore and Alexander Clunes Sheriff | Member of Parliament for Worcester; 1868 – 1874; With: Alexander Clunes Sheriff | Succeeded by Alexander Clunes Sheriff and Thomas Rowley Hill |
