= Francis Rufford =

British politician

Francis Rufford (died 1854) was a British Conservative Party politician.

He was elected at the 1847 general election as a Member of Parliament for Worcester, and resigned from the House of Commons on 20 April 1852 through appointment as Steward of the Chiltern Hundreds.

Parliament of the United Kingdom
Preceded by Joseph Bailey; Sir Denis Le Marchant, Bt	Member of Parliament for Worcester; 1847 – 1852; With: Osman Ricardo	Succeeded by William Laslett; Osman Ricardo
