= Cosmo Duff-Gordon =

Scottish landowner and sportsman (1862–1931)

Sir Cosmo Duff-Gordon Bart.
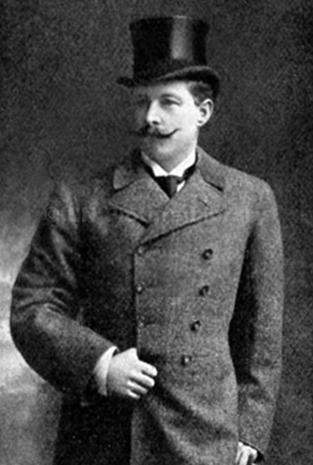
- Duff-Gordon in 1896
- Born: 22 July 1862; London, England
- Died: 20 April 1931 (aged 68); South Kensington, London
- Occupations: Fencer, Landowner
- Known for: Survivor of the RMS Titanic disaster Olympic silver medalist
- Spouse: Lucy Duff-Gordon (m. 1900)

Signature
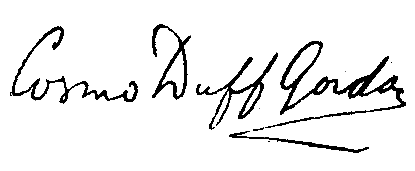
- Sports career
Medal record
Men's fencing
Representing Great Britain
Intercalated Games
Silver medal – second place	1906 Athens	Team épée

Sir Cosmo Edmund Duff-Gordon, 5th Baronet, DL (22 July 1862 – 20 April 1931) was a prominent British aristocrat and sportsman who owned land in Scotland, best known for the controversy surrounding his escape from the sinking of the RMS Titanic.

== Early life ==
The son of Cosmo Lewis Duff-Gordon and Anna Maria, daughter of Sir Edmund Antrobus, 2nd Baronet. Cosmo Duff-Gordon became the 5th Baronet of Halkin in 1896, his title stemming from a Royal licence conferred on his great-great-uncle in 1813 in recognition of his aid to the Crown during the Peninsular War. The Duff-Gordon family are, on the male line, a cadet branch of the Earls of Aberdeen, descending from a younger son of the second Earl of Aberdeen. In 1772 his family had founded the Duff-Gordon sherry bodega in Spain, which still produces high-quality fortified wines. (Note: Duff's heirs sold their share to the family of co-founder Thomas Osborne Mann, and 'Duff Gordon' was rebranded 'Osborne', as it remains today.) The Duff-Gordons were, by descent, a Scottish aristocratic family. He was educated at Eton College, where he was the first Old Etonian to win an Olympic medal.

In 1900, Duff-Gordon married the celebrated London fashion designer "Madame Lucile" (née Lucy Christiana Sutherland, then Mrs. James Stuart Wallace). This was a slightly risqué union, as Lucy was a divorcée whose sister, Elinor Glyn, was a notorious romance novelist.

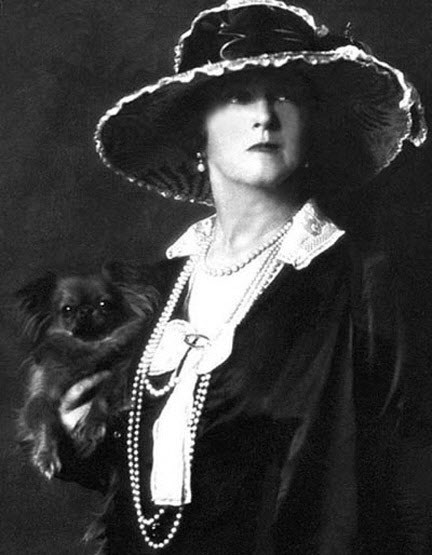
Lady Duff-Gordon (Lucile)

As a sportsman, Duff-Gordon was most noted as a fencer, representing Great Britain at the 1906 Intercalated Games, winning silver in the team épée event. King Edward VII and Queen Alexandra were among distinguished spectators at one of the final bouts between Sir Cosmo and his German opponent Gustav Casmir. Duff-Gordon served on the organizing committee at the 1908 Summer Olympics, appointed by Lord Desborough, chairman of the British Olympic Association. He took part in pistol duelling competitions and was a member of the British team demonstrating the sport in the fencing arena at the 1908 Games. He was also a self-defence enthusiast who trained with champion Swiss wrestler Armand Cherpillod at the Bartitsu Club in London's Soho district. He was a co-founder of the London Fencing League, a member of the Bath Club and the Royal Automobile Club. He was also a sheriff and magistrate in his native Kincardineshire, near Aberdeen, where his ancestral country estate Maryculter was located.

== Titanic voyage ==
Duff-Gordon is best known for the circumstances in which he survived the sinking of the RMS Titanic in 1912, along with his wife and her secretary, Laura Mabel Francatelli. Duff-Gordon and his wife had cabin A16 in the First Class quarters on the Titanic.

The three were among only 12 people who escaped in Lifeboat #1, which had a capacity of 40. The ladies had earlier turned down places in two other lifeboats for women and children because Lucy refused to be separated from her husband.

Duff-Gordon was a witness at the inquiry into the sinking. He was not "on trial" but received much press criticism which claimed that he bribed the sailor in charge of the lifeboat with a £5 note not to return to rescue people struggling in the water. Other witnesses confirmed that the lifeboat had ample space and that he had indeed given the sailor £5. Duff-Gordon stated that the money was to allow the sailor to buy new clothes. Sir Cosmo denied the allegation that he disobeyed orders, maintaining there had been no women or children in the immediate vicinity when his boat was launched, as was confirmed by others. Moreover, Duff-Gordon denied his offer of money to the lifeboat's crew was a bribe (although he could not deny passing the money), and the British Board of Trade's inquiry into the disaster accepted his explanation that it was a charitable contribution for crew members who had lost not only their possessions but their jobs.

The inquiry nonetheless concluded that, if the lifeboat had returned to the wreck site, it might have been able to rescue others (the lifeboat had official space for 28 additional persons). Regarding the bribery allegation, the report stated: "The very gross charge against Sir Cosmo Duff Gordon that, having got into No. 1 boat he bribed the men in it to row away from the drowning people, is unfounded". Despite being cleared of wrongdoing, Duff-Gordon's reputation never recovered.

== Later life and legacy ==
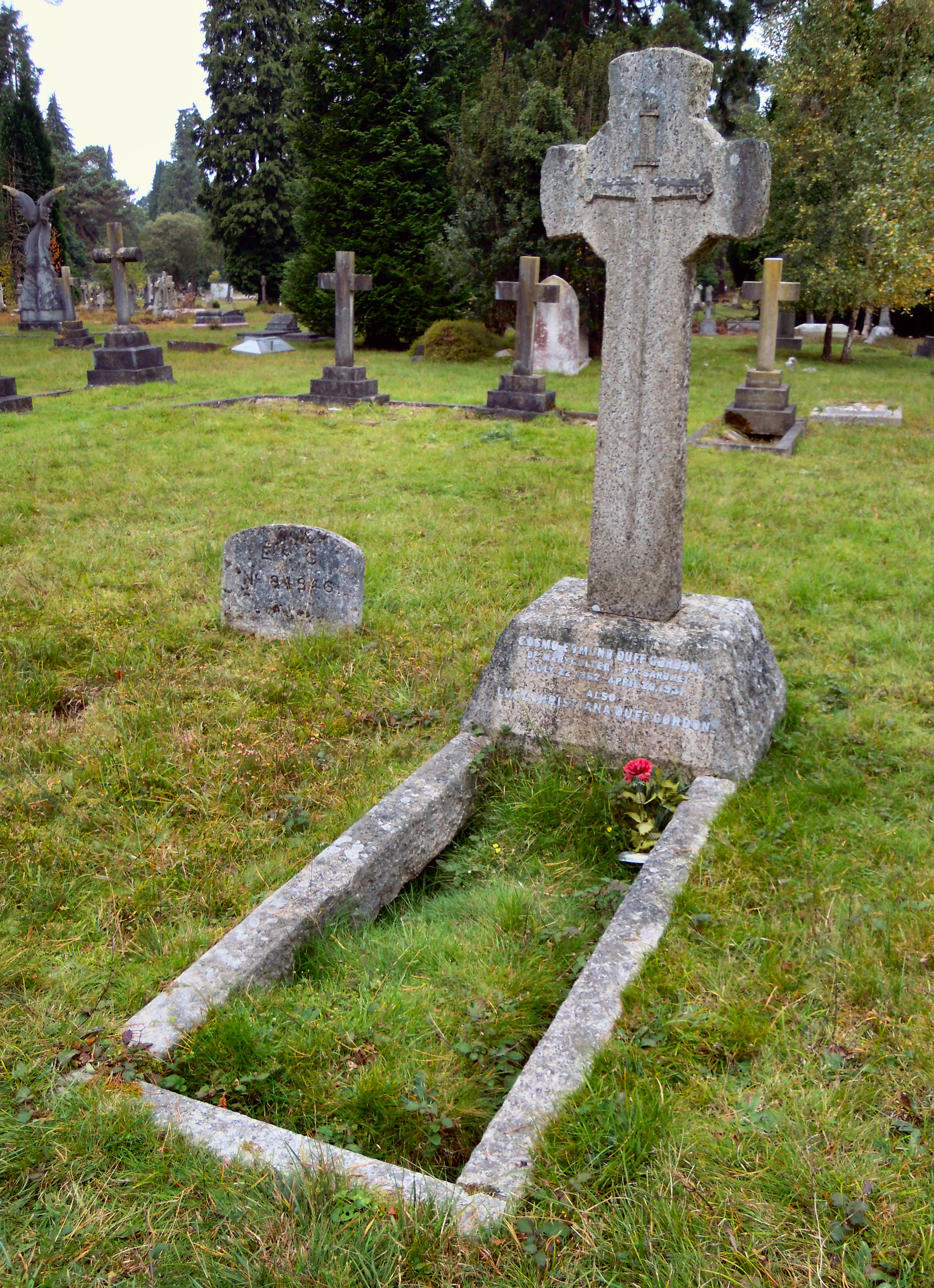
Grave of Duff-Gordon in Brookwood Cemetery

Sir Cosmo Duff-Gordon continued in his social and sporting interests in Scotland and later in London, where he lived at 5 Alfred Place.

He was estranged from his wife from 1915 until his death, although they never divorced and remained friends. He died on 20 April 1931 of natural causes and is buried at Brookwood Cemetery, Woking, Surrey. His wife died exactly four years later, on 20 April 1935.

Sir Cosmo and Lady Duff-Gordon were portrayed by the actors Martin Jarvis and Rosalind Ayres, themselves a married couple, in the 1997 film Titanic. In that film there is also an indirect reference to the alleged bribe that Sir Cosmo gave to officer Murdoch, when a fictional character gives Murdoch some money for a place on a lifeboat. In the 2012 ITV mini-series Titanic the couple were portrayed by Simon Paisley Day and Sylvestra Le Touzel.

In 2012 a box of documents and letters concerning the Titanic sinking belonging to the Duff-Gordons was rediscovered at the London office of Veale Wasbrough Vizards, the legal firm that merged with Tweedies, who represented the couple. Amongst the papers was a rebuttal of the evidence given against them at the Board of Trade inquiry, and an inventory of Lady Duff-Gordon's possessions that were lost, the total value listed as £3,208 3s 6d. In one letter Sir Cosmo complains: "There seems to be a feeling of resentment against any English man being saved....The whole pleasure of having been saved is quite spoilt by the venomous attacks they made at first in the papers. This, I suppose, was because I refused to see any reporter."

Despite the official vindication by the Board of Trade inquiry, public suspicion that the Duff-Gordons had acted selfishly tainted the couple for the remainder of their lives.

== Portrayals ==
- Patrick Waddington (1958) A Night to Remember (British film) (named Sir Richard)
- Martin Jarvis (1997) Titanic
- Simon Paisley Day (2012) Titanic; TV series/Episodes 2 and 4

== See also ==
- Duff-Gordon baronets
- Passengers of the Titanic

== Notes ==
Baronetage of the United Kingdom
Preceded by Maurice Duff-Gordon	Baronet (of Halkin); 1896–1931	Succeeded by Henry William Duff-Gordon
