= Osman Ricardo =

British politician (1795–1881)

Member of Parliament for Worcester
- In office 30 July 1847 – 12 July 1865 Serving with Richard Padmore (1860–1865); William Laslett (1852–1860); Francis Rufford (1847–1852)
- Preceded by: Joseph Bailey; Denis Le Marchant
- Succeeded by: Alexander Clunes Sheriff; Richard Padmore

Personal details
- Born: 25 May 1795
- Died: 2 January 1881 (aged 85)
- Party: Liberal, Whig
- Relations: Samson Ricardo (uncle)
- Parent(s): David Ricardo; Priscilla Anne Wilkinson
- Education: Trinity College, Cambridge

Osman Ricardo (25 May 1795 – 2 January 1881) was a British Liberal and Whig politician.

== Early life ==
Ricardo was born on 25 May 1795 into the wealthy family of Portuguese origin. He was a son of the political economist David Ricardo and Quaker, Priscilla Anne Wilkinson. Among his siblings were David Ricardo, MP for Stroud, and Mortimer Ricardo, who served as an officer in the Life Guards and was DL for Oxfordshire.

The Ricardo family were Sephardic Jews of Portuguese origin who had recently relocated from the Dutch Republic. Among his extended family were uncles Jacob Ricardo (father of John Lewis Ricardo), and Samson Ricardo, also an MP. His maternal great-aunt, Rebecca Delvalle, was wife of the engraver Wilson Lowry, and mother of the engraver Joseph Wilson Lowry and the geologist, mineralogist, and author Delvalle Lowry.

== Career ==
Ricardo was educated at Trinity College, Cambridge.

He was first elected Whig MP for Worcester at the 1847 general election, and, becoming a Liberal in 1859, he held the seat until 1865, when he stood down.

== Personal life ==
In his 1830 book Rural Rides, William Cobbett reports being frightened by a life-sized cross atop the porter's lodge at "Osmond Ricardo's" estate at "Broomsborough" (i.e. Bromsberrow), Worcestershire, on Monday 24 September 1826.

Parliament of the United Kingdom
Preceded by Joseph Bailey; Denis Le Marchant	Member of Parliament for Worcester; 1847–1865; With: Richard Padmore (1860–1865); William Laslett (1852–1860); Francis Rufford (1847–1852)	Succeeded by Alexander Clunes Sheriff; Richard Padmore
