= Le Marchant baronets =

Baronetcy in the Baronetage of the United Kingdom

- Escutcheon of the Le Marchant baronets of Chobham Place
- Creation date: 1841
- Status: extant
- Motto: Me Minerva lucet, Minerva is my light

The Le Marchant Baronetcy, of Chobham Place in the County of Surrey, is a title in the Baronetage of the United Kingdom. It was created on 14 October 1841 for the civil servant and Liberal politician Sir Denis Le Marchant, 1st Baronet. He was Secretary to the Board of Trade from 1836 to 1841, Member of Parliament for Worcester from 1846 to 1847, Under-Secretary of State for the Home Department from 1847 to 1848 and Chief Clerk of the House of Commons from 1850 to 1871. Le Marchant was the second son of Major-General John Le Marchant, who was killed at the Battle of Salamanca in 1812, and the elder brother of the colonial administrator Sir John Le Marchant. The fourth Baronet was a Brigadier-General in the Army. The fifth Baronet served as high sheriff of Lincolnshire from 1958 to 1959.

The Le Marchants are an ancient Guernsey family and are descended from Peter Le Marchant, who served as Lieutenant-Governor of Guernsey in the 13th century.

== Le Marchant baronets, of Chobham Place (1841) ==
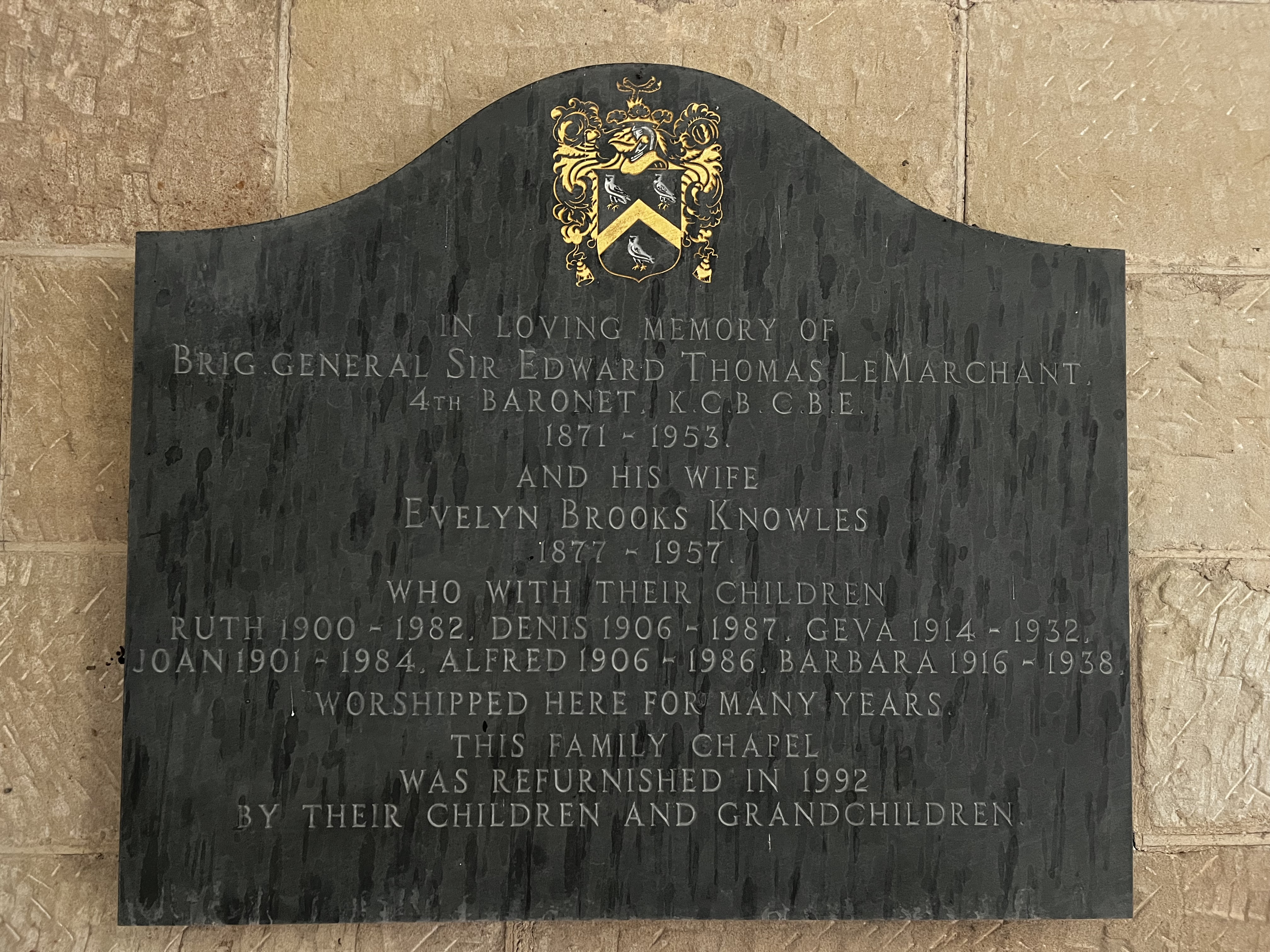
Memorial to the 4th Baronet in St John's Church, Colston Bassett

- Sir Denis Le Marchant, 1st Baronet (1795–1874)
- Sir Henry Denis Le Marchant, 2nd Baronet (1839–1915)
- Sir Denis Le Marchant, 3rd Baronet (1870–1922)
- Sir Edward Thomas Le Marchant, 4th Baronet (1871–1953)
- Sir Denis Le Marchant, 5th Baronet (1906–1987)
- Sir Francis Arthur Le Marchant, 6th Baronet (1939–2016)
- Sir Piers Alfred Le Marchant, 7th Baronet (b. 1964)

The heir apparent to the baronetcy is Edward Le Marchant (b. 1998)
