= Duff-Gordon baronets =

Baronetcy in the Baronetage of the United Kingdom

The Duff (later Duff-Gordon) baronetcy, of Halkin in the County of Aberdeen, is a title in the Baronetage of the United Kingdom. It was created on 12 November 1813 for James Duff, British Consul in Cádiz, with remainder to his nephew, William Gordon.

Duff died unmarried in 1815 and was succeeded according to the special remainder by his nephew, the 2nd Baronet, who assumed the additional surname of Duff on succeeding to the title. He was the second son of Lord Rockville, fourth son of the 2nd Earl of Aberdeen. Duff-Gordon sat as Member of Parliament for Worcester.

Lucy, Lady Duff-Gordon, wife of the fifth Baronet, was a leading fashion designer; and, together with her sister Elinor Glyn, was one of the original 'It' girls.

== Duff (later Duff-Gordon) baronets, of Halkin (1813) ==
- Sir James Duff, 1st Baronet (1734–1815)
- Sir William Duff-Gordon, 2nd Baronet (1772–1823)
- Sir Alexander Cornewall Duff-Gordon, 3rd Baronet (1811–1872)
- Sir Maurice Duff-Gordon, 4th Baronet (1849–1896)
- Sir Cosmo Edmund Duff-Gordon, 5th Baronet (1862–1931)
- Sir Henry William Duff-Gordon, 6th Baronet (1866–1953)
- Sir Douglas Frederick Duff-Gordon, 7th Baronet (1892–1964)
- Sir Andrew Cosmo Lewis Duff-Gordon, 8th Baronet (1933–2023)
- Sir Cosmo Henry Villiers Duff-Gordon, 9th Baronet (born 1968). His son Jack Charles Villiers Duff-Gordon, born 2006, is his heir.

== See also ==
- Marquess of Aberdeen and Temair

Baronetage of the United Kingdom
Preceded by Hewett baronets	Duff-Gordon baronets of Halkin; 13 November 1813	Succeeded by Borough baronets
