= All Saints Church, Barrowby =

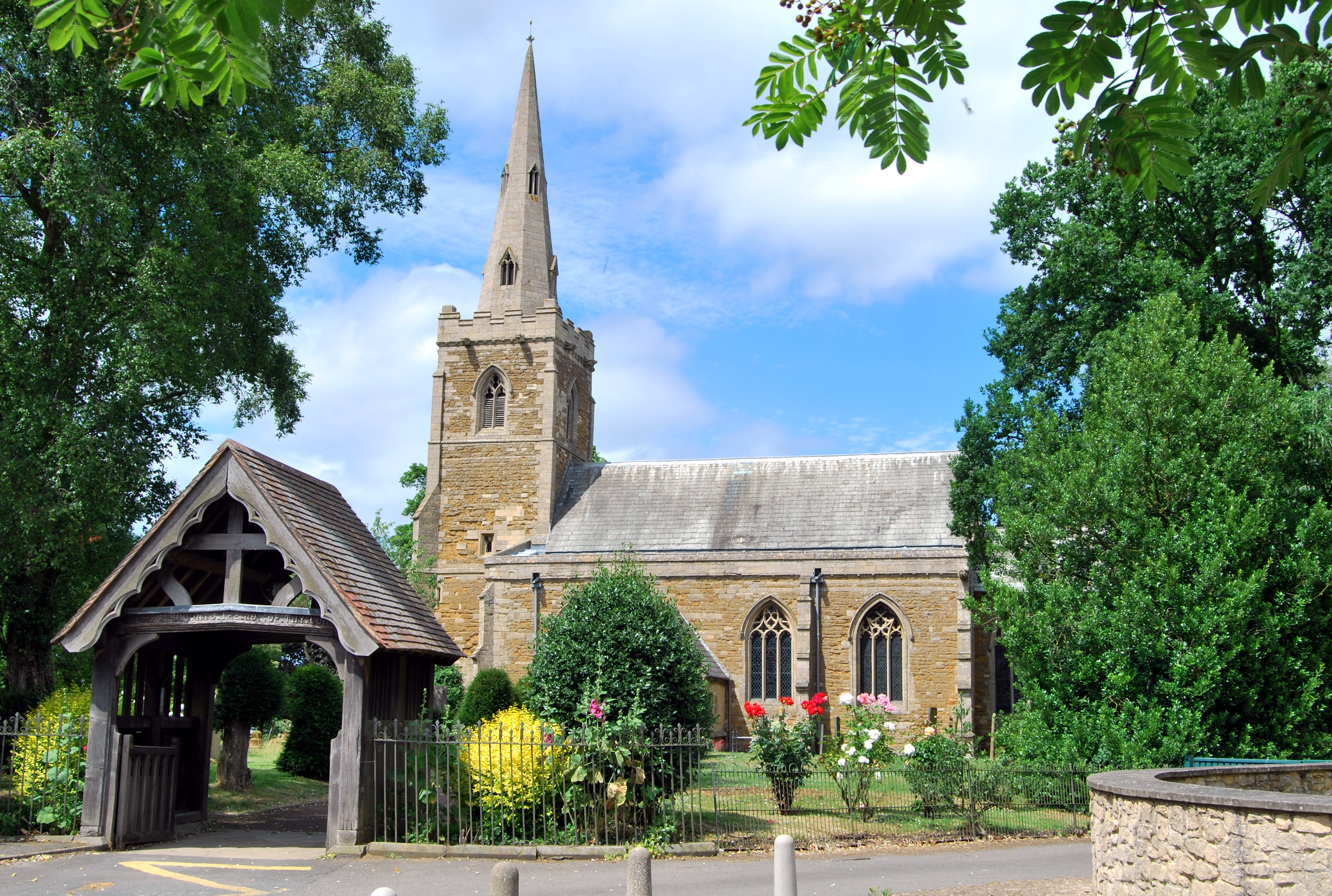
- All Saints Church and lychgate, Barrowby
- All Saints Church, Barrowby
- 52.9187°N 0.6947°W
- OS grid reference: SK 87864 36492
- Country: England
- Denomination: Church of England

History
- Dedication: All Saints

Administration
- Province: Canterbury
- Diocese: Lincoln
- Deanery: Deanery of Grantham
- Parish: Barrowby and Great Gonerby

All Saints Church is a Grade I listed Anglican church in Barrowby, Lincolnshire, England. The church is 2 miles (3.2 km) west from Grantham on a hillside overlooking the Vale of Belvoir, and to the south of the A52. All Saints is in the ecclesiastical parish of Barrowby and Great Gonerby.

== History ==
A church and its priest at Barrowby is mentioned in the Domesday Book account.

During the suppression of the monasteries All Saints' medieval stained glass was destroyed, as was, in 1561, a rood screen with its attached gilded crucifix and figures of Mary and St John, and the Easter Sepulchre. The suppression also caused the breaking-up of the altar stones and the sale of the altar cross and candlesticks.

Thomas Hurst was rector of Barrowby from 1629, having been born here in 1598. Chaplain to Charles I, he spent the First English Civil War with the Royalists, during which time, in 1644, he lost his living, which was sequestrated and given to Robert Ram, Minister of Spalding, Lincolnshire, who was chaplain in the Parliamentary army. He was reinstated in 1660. He died on 17 March 1674 and is memorialized in the church. A further notable minister was James Menteath, who became rector in 1759. He was a Snell scholar between 1736 and 1741 as a contemporary scholar of Adam Smith, and "…may have been in the 'good company' Smith met in that place. Like Smith, he responded to the furore over tar-water, and tried drinking it himself, to his moderate benefit, he thought…"

Before the early 19th century a church band played for All Saints' services, after which a church organ was installed. New pews were added: "after being many years in a mutilated condition, the old pews were removed, and the church was restored, beautified and refitted with neat open benches of pine". During the latter half of the 19th century restoration was carried out on the spire and roof, and a new organ and choir stalls were installed, while stained glass was fitted into late 14th-century windows. The Rev. George Earle Welby (rector from 1849) founded the village’s church school, and gave the church its c. 1891 timber-framed lychgate, now a Grade II listed structure.

== Architecture ==
All Saints is a limestone ashlar and ironstone church with a Westmorland and Welsh slate roof. Its tower is of Decorated style with an octagonal spire containing two tiers of lucarnes. The tower contains six bells.

The church' north aisle dates from the late 13th century, its north windows being of Perpendicular style. There are north and south arcades. The north is in two parts that comprise two bays each; the south has four bays with octagonal piers – the pier details could be of an earlier date than the exterior. The windows in the aisles are of Decorated style. In the earliest part of the chancel is a 13th-century priests' door, the chancel itself having Decorated and Perpendicular windows. In the chancel’s outer wall is part of an interlaced pattern, probably Anglo-Saxon, and probably taken from a cross shaft. The porch is 15th century and contains stone benches. A 13th-century piscina and three sedilia, restored in the 19th century, are on the interior south side. The font is octagonal and Perpendicular, with two-light windows in its stem, through which can be seen the image of a devil. The bowl itself has eight three-light windows. The screen too is Perpendicular. The octagonal oak pulpit is 19th century, possibly constructed with old wood taken from the previous rood screen. Pevsner notes a 1696 chalice and paten, and an 1808 alms basin by Peter and William Bateman. There are brasses to Nicolas Deen (d. 1479), and the wife (d. 1508) of James Deen, and a tablet to the family of Dr Hurst, Chaplain to Charles I, dated 1674. The Hurst tablet inscription reads: "Dr Hurst hath Iyeing within this chancel seven children namely, Anne, Lewis, Mary, Elizabeth, Charles, Sarayh, and Anna. This is to their memory 1675".

Cox (1916) notes:

"The church… standing on high ground, commanding fine views of the Vale of Belvoir, has a fine spire and is chiefly of Dec. date, but there is an E.E. door-way and some lancets. The octagonal font, c. 1340, is a noteworthy Dec. example enriched with tracery; the singular feature is that the shaft is hollow and perforated and contains within it some grotesque carvings of demons, probably representing the ejection of sin by the grace of Holy Baptism. There are effigies in brass to Nicholas and Katherine Deene, the lady in butterfly headdress, and their nine sons, c. 1479; and to James Deene (effigy lost), 1498, and to Margaret his wife, 1500".

Kelly's Directory of 1885 describes the church, its history and living as:

The church of All Saints is a building of the Early English and Decorated periods, consisting of chancel, nave of four bays, aisles and a tower, with spire containing 5 bells : the font is a particularly rich and beautiful specimen of Decorated work, panelled and elaborately carved : portions of the rood screen, displaced, remain : there is a brass to Nicholas Deene (temp. El. IV.) and Katherine (Pedwardine), his wife, with effigies of both, and of nine sons : and another brass to James Deene, grandson of the foregoing Nicholas, 1498, and Margaret (Armine), his wife, 1500 : the effigy of James Deene is lost, but that of his wife, clad in an heraldic mantle, remains : there are three other slabs, despoiled of their brasses : there is a monument of later date to Dr. Hurst, formerly rector of Barrowby and Headenham, [sic] and chaplain to Charles I.; he was plundered, imprisoned and ejected on account of his loyalty to the king, but eventually died here in 1674: the church was restored in 1854, and an organ chamber was added in 1870 : the east window, a Perpendicular one of three lights, has recently (1884) been filled with stained glass, the centre light by the vicar, the others by subscription, the total cost being £140. The register dates from the year 1538. The living is a rectory, yearly value £1,200, including 420 acres of glebe, and residence, in the gift of the Duke of Devonshire K.O. and held since 1849 by the Rev. George Earle WeIlby B.A. of Trinity College, Cambridge, rural dean.
