= George Coventry, 9th Earl of Coventry =

British Conservative politician

The Right Honourable The Earl of Coventry PC DL
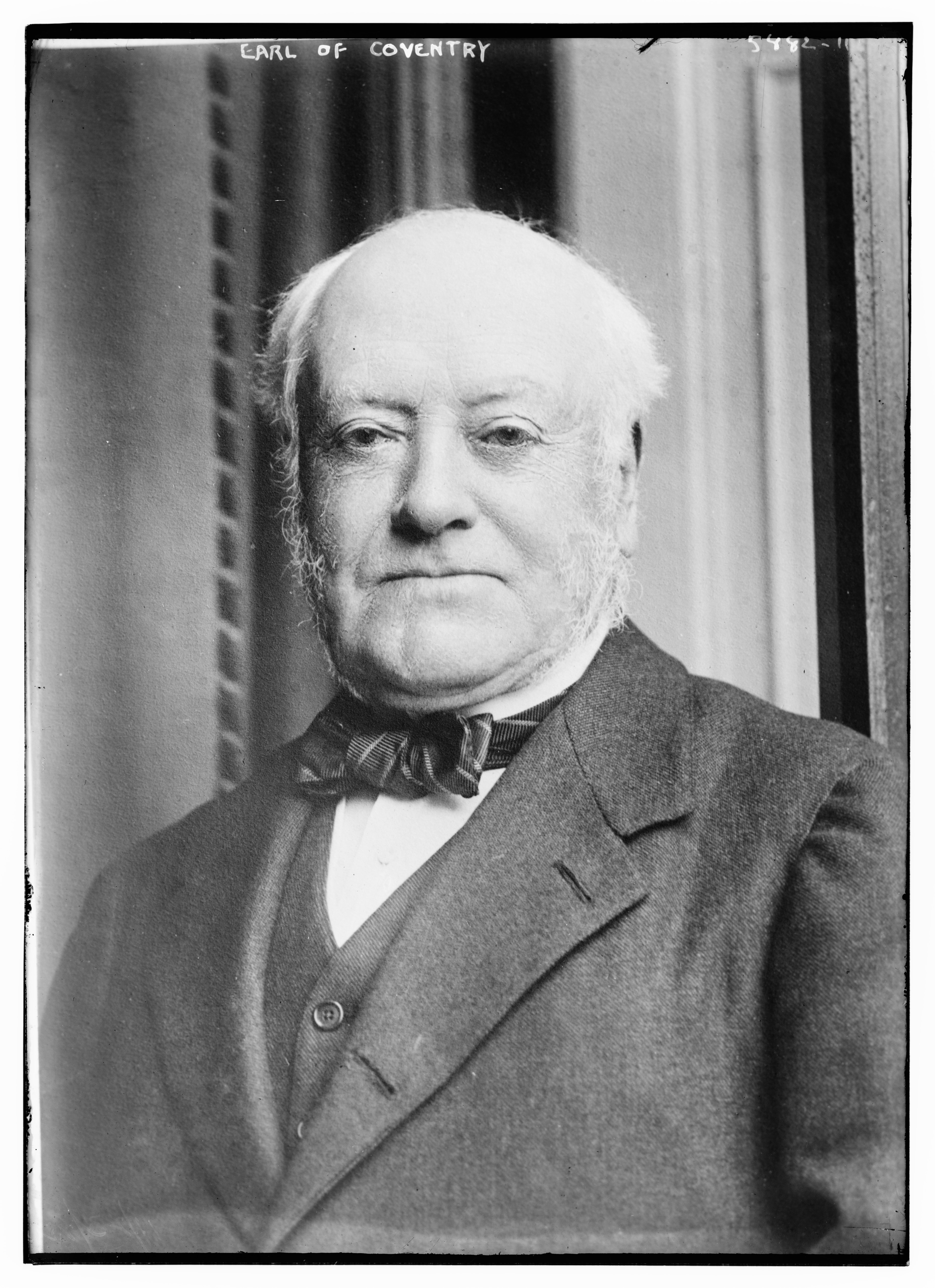
- Lord Coventry c. 1920–1925

Master of the Buckhounds
- In office 16 July 1895 – 1 November 1900
- Monarch: Victoria
- Prime Minister: The Marquess of Salisbury
- Preceded by: The Lord Ribblesdale
- Succeeded by: The Lord Chesham
- In office 16 August 1886 – 25 August 1892
- Monarch: Victoria
- Prime Minister: The Marquess of Salisbury
- Preceded by: The Lord Suffield
- Succeeded by: The Lord Ribblesdale

Captain of the Honourable Corps of Gentlemen-at-Arms
- In office 6 July 1885 – 28 January 1886
- Monarch: Victoria
- Prime Minister: The Marquess of Salisbury
- Preceded by: The Lord Carrington
- Succeeded by: The Lord Sudeley
- In office 28 May 1877 – 21 April 1880
- Monarch: Victoria
- Prime Minister: The Earl of Beaconsfield
- Preceded by: The Earl of Shrewsbury
- Succeeded by: The Earl Fife

Member of the House of Lords Lord Temporal
- In office 9 May 1859 – 13 March 1930; Hereditary Peerage
- Preceded by: 8th Earl of Coventry
- Succeeded by: 10th Earl of Coventry

Personal details
- Born: 9 May 1838 Wilton Crescent, London
- Died: 13 March 1930 (aged 91)
- Party: Conservative
- Spouse: Lady Blanche Craven (m. 1865)
- Education: Christ Church, Oxford

George William Coventry, 9th Earl of Coventry, PC, DL (9 May 1838 – 13 March 1930), styled Viscount Deerhurst from November 1838 until 1843, was a British Conservative politician. He was Captain of the Gentlemen-at-Arms between 1877 and 1880 and again between 1885 and 1886 as well as Master of the Buckhounds between 1886 and 1892 and again between 1895 and 1901.

== Early life ==
Coventry was born on 9 May 1838 at Wilton Crescent, London. He was the son of George William Coventry, Viscount Deerhurst, and the former Harriett Anne Cockerell. His elder sister, Lady Maria Emma Catherine Coventry, was the wife of Hon. Gerald Henry Brabazon Ponsonby (the youngest son of John Ponsonby, 4th Earl of Bessborough).

His paternal grandparents were George Coventry, 8th Earl of Coventry and the former Hon. Emma Susanna Lygon (a daughter of William Lygon, 1st Earl Beauchamp). Sir Charles Cockerell, 1st Baronet and the former Hon. Harriet Rushout (a daughter of John Rushout, 1st Baron Northwick).

He was educated at Eton and Christ Church, Oxford.

== Career ==
Coventry sat on the Conservative benches in the House of Lords and served as Captain of the Honourable Corps of Gentlemen-at-Arms under the Earl of Beaconsfield from 1877 to 1880 and under Lord Salisbury from 1885 to 1886 and under Salisbury as Master of the Buckhounds from 1886 to 1892 and again from 1895 to 1900. In 1877 he was admitted to the Privy Council.

Coventry was also Lord Lieutenant of Worcestershire from 1891 to 1903, and was the Honorary Colonel of the 3rd and 4th (Worcestershire Militia) Battalions, Worcestershire Regiment from 1900. He was honoured as Lord High steward of Tewkesbury in December 1901, and received the Honorary Freedom of the borough of Tewkesbury in January 1902. During the First World War the Earl of Coventry, as Lord Lieutenant, was the figurehead of the county war effort. He chaired a number of committees and charities, and was President of the Worcestershire Volunteer Regiment of the Volunteer Training Corps (the WW1 Home Guard). Apart from his political career he was also involved in horseracing. His racing colours were brown with blue cap and were carried to victory in consecutive Grand Nationals by the half-sisters Emblem, 1863, and Emblematic, 1864. In 1899 he was President of the Royal Agricultural Society.

The Earl was also interested in the development of agriculture and maintained a paternalistic attitude toward his tenants. He established a jam factory in order to provide them with a local outlet for their fruit although this proved unable to compete with larger-scale commercial competitors and went into liquidation in 1908.

== Personal life ==
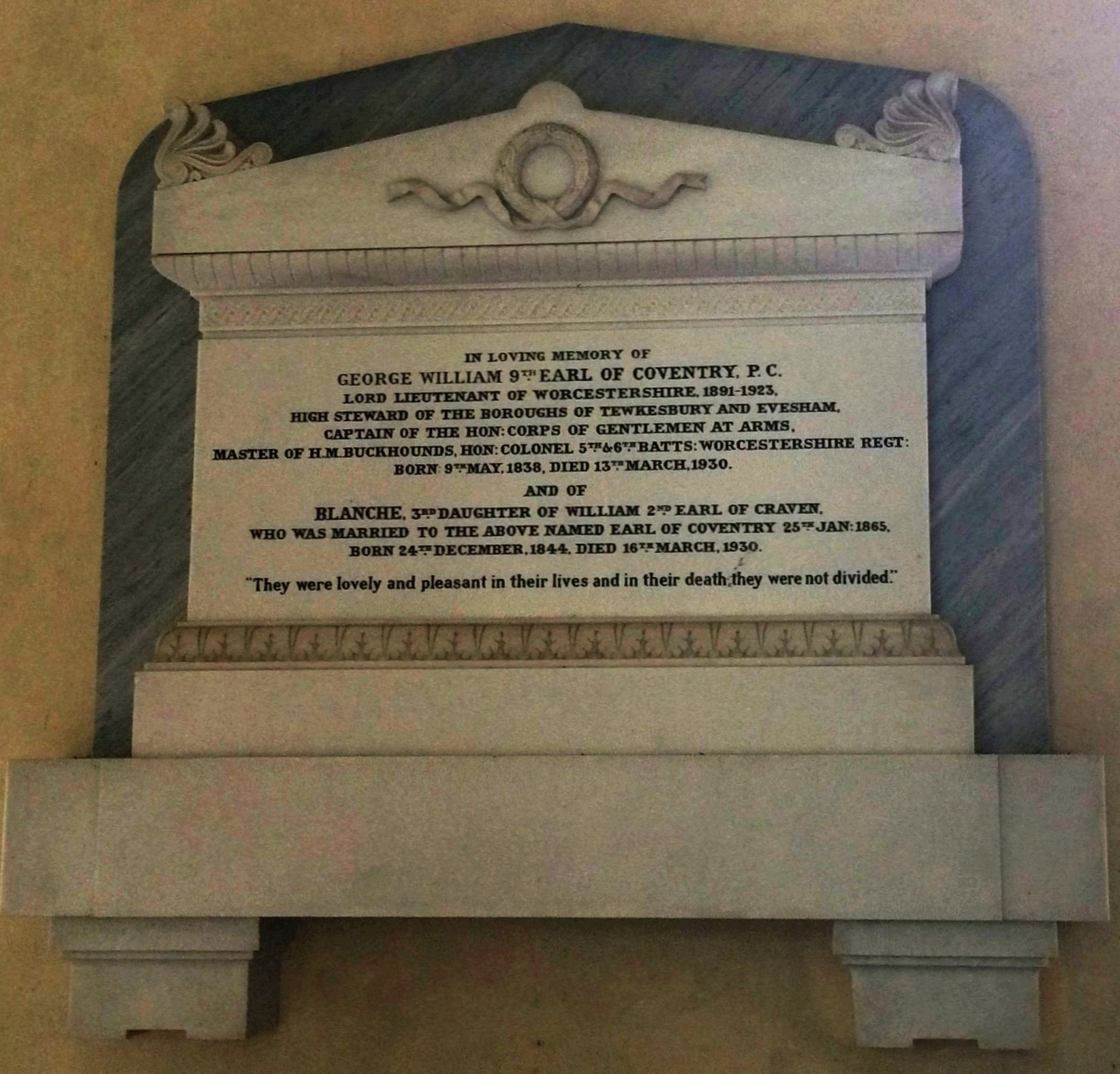
Memorial to the 9th Earl of Coventry in the church at Croome Court

On 25 January 1865, Lord Coventry married Lady Blanche Craven, daughter of William Craven, 2nd Earl of Craven and the former Lady Emily Mary Grimston (a daughter of James Grimston, 1st Earl of Verulam). Together they had six sons and three daughters:

- George William Coventry, Viscount Deerhurst (1865–1927), who married the American-born Virginia Lee Bonynge (nee Daniel), daughter of William Daniel who was adopted by Charles William Bonynge.
- Hon. Charles John Coventry (1867–1929), who was a soldier and successful cricketer; he married Lily Whitehouse, daughter of William Fitzhugh Whitehouse and sister to U.S. diplomat Edwin Sheldon Whitehouse, in 1900.
- Hon. Henry Thomas Coventry (1868–1934), who also played first-class cricket; he married Edith (née Kip) McCreery, daughter of Col. Lawrence Kip and Eva Lorillard, in 1907.
- Hon. Sir Reginald William Coventry (1869–1940), who married Gwenllian Pascoe Morgan, daughter of Edward Vaughan Morgan, in 1911. After her death in 1925, he married Frances Constance Jones, daughter of Charles Gwillim Jones, in 1926.
- Lady Barbara Elizabeth Coventry (1870–1946), who married Gerald Dudley Smith, son of Dudley Robert Smith, in 1894.
- Lady Dorothy Coventry (1872–1965), who married Sir Keith Fraser, 5th Baronet, in 1910.
- Lady Anne Blanche Alice Coventry (1874–1956), who married Prince Victor Duleep Singh, the eldest son of Maharaja Duleep Singh.
- Hon. William Francis Coventry (1875–1937), who died unmarried.
- Hon. Thomas George Coventry (1885–1972), who married Alice Ward, daughter of Thomas Ward, in 1910. They divorced around 1930.

Lord Coventry was present, as an advisor to the Prince of Wales, with his wife at the Royal Baccarat Scandal at Tranby Croft in 1890. He played a major part in obtaining the signature of Sir William Gordon-Cumming to an incriminating document intended to protect the Prince, but which failed to cover up the scandal.

Lord Coventry died on 13 March 1930, aged 91, and was succeeded in the earldom by his grandson George, the son of George William Coventry, Viscount Deerhurst. Lady Coventry survived her husband by only three days and died on 16 March 1930, aged 87.

Political offices
Preceded by The Earl of Shrewsbury	Captain of the Gentlemen-at-Arms; 1877–1880	Succeeded by The Earl Fife
Preceded by The Lord Carrington	Captain of the Gentlemen-at-Arms; 1885–1886	Succeeded by The Lord Sudeley
Preceded by The Lord Suffield	Master of the Buckhounds; 1886–1892	Succeeded by The Lord Ribblesdale
Preceded by The Lord Ribblesdale	Master of the Buckhounds; 1895–1901	Succeeded by The Lord Chesham
Honorary titles
Preceded by The Earl Beauchamp	Lord Lieutenant of Worcestershire; 1891–1923	Succeeded by The Viscount Cobham
Peerage of England
Preceded by George Coventry	Earl of Coventry; 1843–1930	Succeeded by George Coventry
