= Abberton, Worcestershire =

Village in Worcestershire, England

Coordinates: 52.1793°N 2.011°W

Abberton
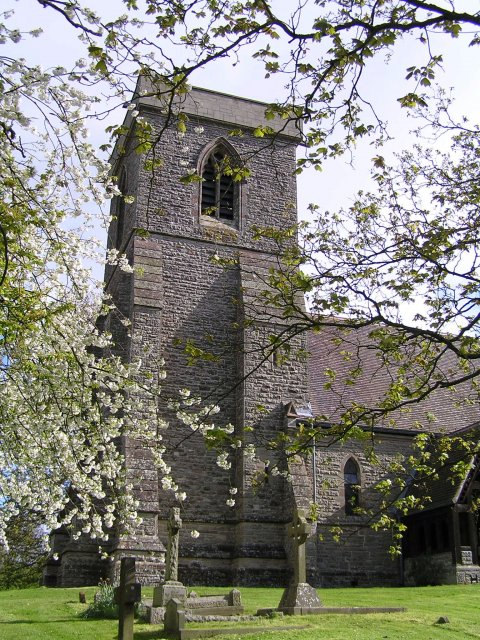
- Abberton Church

- Location within Worcestershire
- Population: 63 (2021)
- OS grid reference: SO993534
  - London: 93 miles (150 km)
- District: Wychavon
- Shire county: Worcestershire
- Region: West Midlands
- Country: England
- Sovereign state: United Kingdom
- Post town: PERSHORE
- Postcode district: WR10
- Dialling code: 01386
- Police: West Mercia
- Fire: Hereford and Worcester
- Ambulance: West Midlands
- UK Parliament: Redditch

Abberton is a small village in Worcestershire, England. In 2021, the population was 63.

The principal house in the village is Abberton Hall.

== History ==
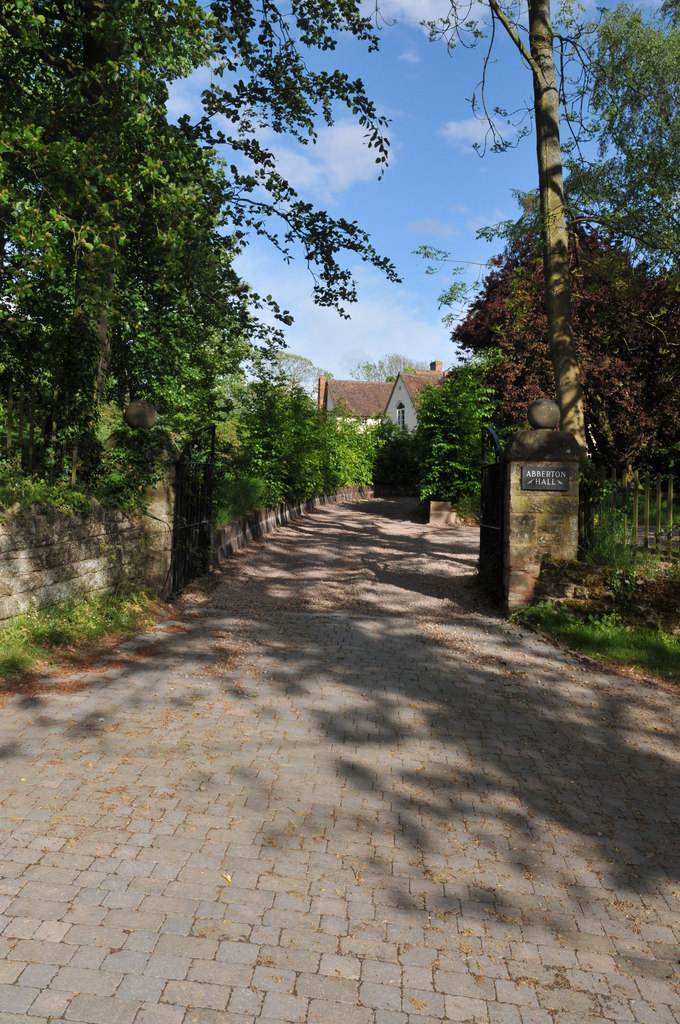
Entrance to Abberton Hall

The names 'Abberton' is derived from 'Estate called after Eadbriht' (Ēadbriht + ing + tūn). The village is mentioned in the Cartularium Saxonicum in 972 as Eadbrihyincgtun, and is recorded in the Domesday Book of 1086–7 as Edbretintune and as Edbritone, when it was a berewick, an outlying estate, held by the Church of St Mary of Pershore. It is also later recorded as Adbrighton in 1297-1377 and Abburton in 1535.

Between the mid-16th century to late-18th century, the Manor of Abberton was held by the Sheldon family.

In the 1850s, the village had 80 inhabitants, one fourth of this was the local clerk's 19 children. In 1894, the town had a population of 95 and an area of 999 acres (4.04 km^{2}).
