= Pensham =

Village in Worcestershire, England

Coordinates: 52.09611°N 2.08754°W

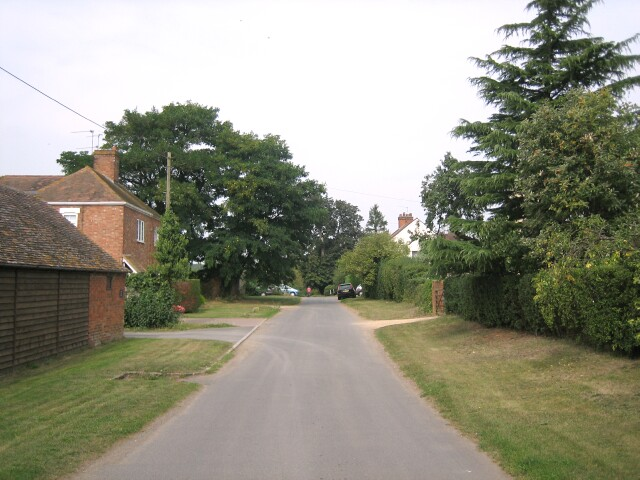
- Pensham

- Location within Worcestershire
- OS grid reference: SO941442
- District: Wychavon
- Shire county: Worcestershire
- Region: West Midlands
- Country: England
- Sovereign state: United Kingdom
- Post town: PERSHORE
- Postcode district: WR10
- Police: West Mercia
- Fire: Hereford and Worcester
- Ambulance: West Midlands

Pensham is a village located 1.5 miles (2.4 km) south-west of Pershore in Worcestershire, England.

Pensham is surrounded on three sides by a loop of the River Avon, despite the proximity of the river Pensham has no records of ever being flooded.

Pensham no longer has a pub or shop, but since 2000 there has been a village field after some of the residents raised enough funds to buy a couple of acres of land. This has since been planted to provide a wooded area and an orchard area, with an open area between for village functions and sports. Pensham is a quiet area to live and any noise that is heard is often a tractor or a dog barking. There are many tracks to walk and from time to time ramblers visit the village.
