= Edmund Lechmere (Worcester MP) =

British Member of Parliament (1747–1798)

Edmund Lechmere (8 September 1747 – 31 October 1798) was a British politician, MP for Worcester 1790–1796.

Lechmere was born at Hanley Castle on 8 September 1747, the son of Edmund Lechmere MP (1710–1805), and his first wife Elizabeth Charlton. Nicholas Lechmere Charlton MP (1733–1807) was Lechmere's older brother; Sir Anthony Lechmere, 1st Bt. (1766–1849) was his younger half-brother.

He matriculated at The Queen's College, Oxford in 1764 aged 16, and graduated B.A. 1768, M.A. 1770. He entered the Inner Temple in 1771, and was called to the bar in 1774.

Lechmere was elected MP for Worcester in 1790 as a supporter of the government of William Pitt the Younger, and initially supported the government. By 1795 he had turned against the government, voting against the King's Speech (29 October 1795), against the Seditious Meetings Act 1795 (10 November 1795), for peace negotiation (15 February 1796), against the loans (26 February 1796), for inquiry into the national finances (10 March 1796), and against the conduct of the war (10 May 1796). He spoke frequently on the plight of the poor, opposing grain exports at a time of national shortage.

He did not stand for re-election in 1796.

Avoiding his creditors, he moved to Holyrood, Edinburgh. He was arrested in sanctuary in June 1797 for debt, but his immunity was upheld. He died on 31 October 1798.

Parliament of Great Britain
Preceded by Edmund Wigley; Samuel Smith	Member of Parliament for Worcester; 1790–1796; With: Edmund Wigley	Succeeded by Edmund Wigley; Abraham Robarts
