= George Coventry, 10th Earl of Coventry =

The Right Honourable The Earl of Coventry
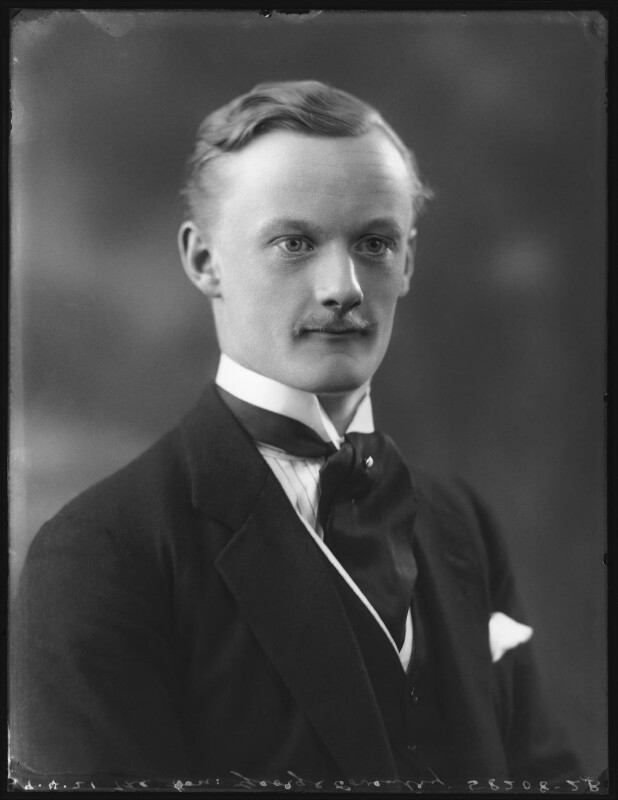

Member of the House of Lords Lord Temporal
- In office 13 March 1930 – 27 May 1940; Hereditary Peerage
- Preceded by: 9th Earl of Coventry
- Succeeded by: 11th Earl of Coventry

Personal details
- Born: 10 September 1900
- Died: 27 May 1940 (aged 39)

George William Reginald Victor Coventry, 10th Earl of Coventry (10 September 1900 - 27 May 1940) was the son of George William Coventry, Viscount Deerhurst and Virginia Bonynge (born Daniels), step- and adopted daughter of Charles Bonynge. As his father predeceased his grandfather, the 10th Earl was his grandfather's heir to the earldom. George Coventry inherited both the earldom and the viscountcy on 13 March 1930. He was educated at Ludgrove School and Eton College.

== Politics ==
Standing as a Unionist, Coventry unsuccessfully stood in the Carmarthen Constituency in the 1922 General Election.

General election 1922: Carmarthen
Party	Candidate	Votes	%	±%
National Liberal	John Hinds	12,530	41.9	N/A
Unionist	George Coventry	8,805	29.4	N/A
National Farmers' Union	Daniel Johns	4,775	15.9	N/A
Liberal	H. Llewelyn-Williams	3,847	12.8	N/A
Majority		3,725	12.5	N/A
Turnout		29,957	82.7	N/A
Registered electors		36,213		
National Liberal gain from Liberal				

== Military service ==
Coventry was a Lieutenant in the 7th Battalion, Worcestershire Regiment, which was part of the original Expeditionary Force sent to France in September 1939. His regiment was subsequently evacuated during the retreat from Dunkirk; Coventry was killed in action 27 May 1940 at La Bassée, during the Battle of Dunkirk which preceded it. He is buried in the communal cemetery at Givenchy-lès-la-Bassée.

A memorial service was held at Croome Church in Worcester on 21 July 1940.

== Family and personal life ==
He married the Honourable Nesta Donne Philipps in September 1921; they had four children. His youngest child, also named George William Coventry and subsequently 11th Earl of Coventry was born at Croome Court on 25 January 1934. The 10th earl's daughters were Anne Donne, Joan Blanche, and Maria Alice Coventry.

In 1932, he was appointed the Deputy Lieutenant for the county of Worcestershire.

He served as a company director of the London and Thames Haven Oil Wharves Limited.

Coventry enjoyed hunting and was the Master of the Carmarthenshire Hounds, the Hawkstone Hounds as well as the Croome Hounds.

Peerage of England
Preceded by George Coventry	Earl of Coventry; 1930–1940	Succeeded by George William Coventry
