= George William Coventry, 11th Earl of Coventry =

English noble and politician

The Right Honourable The Earl of Coventry

Earl of Coventry
- In office 1940–2002
- Preceded by: George Coventry
- Succeeded by: Francis Coventry

Member of the House of Lords Lord Temporal
- In office 21 March 1956 – 11 November 1999; Hereditary Peerage
- Preceded by: 10th Earl of Coventry
- Succeeded by: seat abolished (House of Lords Act 1999)

Personal details
- Born: 25 January 1934 London, England
- Died: 14 June 2002 (aged 68)
- Party: Conservative
- Spouse(s): Marie Medhart (m. 1955; div. 1963) Ann Cripps (m. 1969; div. 1975) Valerie Ann Birch (m. 1980; div. 1988) Rachel Wynne Mason (m. 1992)
- Children: Edward Coventry, Viscount Deerhurst
- Parent(s): George Coventry, 10th Earl of Coventry; Nesta Donne Philips
- Education: Stowe School; Eton College

George William Coventry, 11th Earl of Coventry (25 January 1934 – 14 June 2002) was a British hereditary peer and politician of the Conservative Party.

== Life and career ==
Coventry was the fourth child and only son of George Coventry, 10th Earl of Coventry and Nesta Donne Philips. He inherited the title Earl of Coventry at the age of six, when his father was killed in action during the Battle of Wytschaete on 27 May 1940.

He attended Ludgrove School in Berkshire, Stowe School in Buckinghamshire and Eton College. He attended The Royal Military Academy, Sandhurst and was commissioned into the Grenedier Guards in 1954. On 21 March 1956 he took his seat in the House of Lords. He worked as stock broker, fashion designer, merchant and director of an oil company. He supported John Major, after joining the Conservative Party in the 1990s. He lost his seat in the House of Lords by the House of Lords Act 1999 and did not compete for one of the remaining seats.

== Family ==
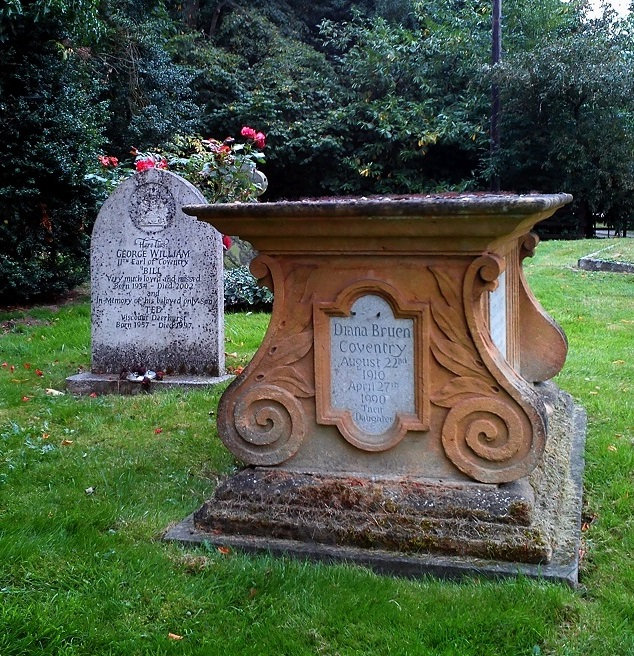
Graves of the 11th Earl of Coventry and of Charles Coventry (1867–1929), at St Nicholas' Church, Earls Croome

Coventry was married four times:

- He married Marie Medhart on 22 March 1955, the daughter of William Medhart. The couple divorced in 1963.
- He married Ann Cripps on 5 December 1969 and divorced in 1975.
- He married Valerie Ann Birch on 29 November 1980 and divorced in 1988.
- Finally, he married Rachel Wynne Mason on 4 July 1992.

He died in June 2002 at the age of 68 years. The title was inherited by his 89-year-old cousin Francis Coventry, 12th Earl of Coventry (1912–2004), because his son of the first marriage Edward Coventry, Viscount Deerhurst had previously died in 1997.

Political offices
Peerage of England
Preceded by George Coventry	Earl of Coventry; 1940–2002	Succeeded by Francis Coventry
