= Abraham Robarts (MP for Worcester) =

English banker and politician

Member of Parliament for Worcester
- In office 1796–1816 Serving with Edmund Wigley, Joseph Scott, Henry Bromley, William Gordon
- Preceded by: Edmund Lechmere; Edmund Wigley
- Succeeded by: William Gordon; Viscount Deehurst

Personal details
- Born: 27 September 1745
- Died: 26 November 1816 (aged 71)
- Spouse: Sabine Tierney (m. 1774; died 1816)
- Children: 9, including Abraham, James, William, George
- Parent(s): Abraham Robarts; Elizabeth Wildey

Abraham Robarts (27 September 1745 – 26 November 1816) was an English banker and politician. He was a factor in the West Indies trade, and a director of the East India Company.

== Early life ==
Robarts was born on 27 September 1745, a son of Capt. Abraham Robarts of Stepney, Middlesex, by the former Elizabeth Wildey (daughter and heiress of Samuel Wildey of Stepney).

== Career ==
Early in his career he was a partner with James Tierney in the firm of Tierney, Lilly and Robarts, Spanish merchants.

He became a Director of the Royal Exchange Insurance Company from 1781 to 1786 and then served as a director of the East India Company six times between 1786 and 1815, normally for three years each time.

In 1792, he became a city banker in partnership with Sir William Curtis in the firm of Robarts, Curtis, Were, Hornyold and Berwick, of Cornhill.

Robarts went into politics first in 1784, as an unsuccessful candidate in Wootton Bassett. He established himself as Member of Parliament at Worcester in 1796, when his local banking associate Edmund Lechmere MP (1747–1798) got into financial difficulties and had to give up the seat. Robarts was an uncontested candidate, and won successive terms, sitting until his death in 1816.

== Personal life ==
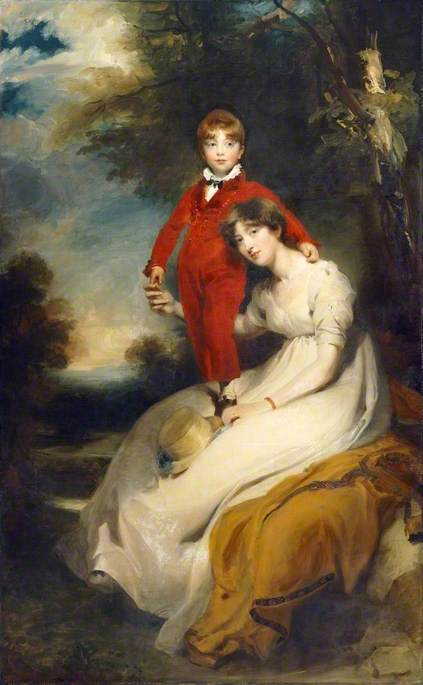
Mrs Charles Thellusson (the former Sabine Robarts), portrait by Thomas Lawrence

On 16 June 1774, Robarts was married to Sabine Tierney (1752–1833), a daughter of Thomas Tierney and sister of George Tierney. Together, they had four sons and five daughters, including:

- Sabine Robarts (1775–1814), who married Charles Thellusson, MP for Worcester and son of merchant Peter Thellusson, in 1795.
- Abraham Wildey Robarts (1779–1858), MP for Maidstone who married Charlotte Anne Wilkinson in 1808.
- Sophia Charlotte Robarts (1781–1855), who died unmarried.
- George James Robarts (1782–1829), MP for Wallingford.
- Sidney Robarts (1788–1852), who married John Edward Madocks, MP for Denbigh Boroughs and nephew of William Madocks, in 1817.
- James Thomas Robarts (1784–1825), of the East India Company who married Charlotte Lloyd in 1825. After his death she married Robert Dent Esq. in 1826.
- William Tierney Robarts (1786–1820), MP for St. Albans who died unmarried.
- Marianne Jane Roberts (1787–1842).

Robarts died a wealthy man upon his death on 26 November 1816.

=== Descendants ===
Through his son Abraham, he was a grandfather of banker Abraham George Robarts, who married Elizabeth Sarah Smyth (daughter of John Henry Smyth and Lady Elizabeth FitzRoy of Heath Hall). Their son, Abraham John Robarts of Robarts, Lubbock & Co., married Hon. Edith Barrington (a daughter of the 8th Viscount Barrington) and were the parents of banker Gerald Robarts.

Through his daughter Sidney, he was a grandfather of Henry Robarts Madocks (c. 1825–1902), who married Hon. Amelia Napier (daughter of Robert Napier, 1st Baron Napier). Among their children were Ermine Mary Katherine Murray (née Madocks), Viscountess Elibank (wife of the 2nd Viscount Elibank).

Parliament of Great Britain
Preceded by Edmund Lechmere; Edmund Wigley	Member of Parliament for Worcester; 1796–1816; With: Edmund Wigley (1796–1802); Joseph Scott (1802–1806); Henry Bromley (1806–1807); William Gordon (1807–1816)	Succeeded by William Gordon; Viscount Deehurst
