= George Coventry, 8th Earl of Coventry =

British politician (1784–1843)

The Right Honourable The Earl of Coventry

Lord Lieutenant and Custos Rotulorum of Worcestershire
- In office 1838–1843

Member of Parliament for Worcester
- In office 1816–1826 Serving with William Gordon, Thomas H. H. Davies
- Preceded by: Abraham Robarts; William Gordon
- Succeeded by: Thomas H. H. Davies; George Richard Robinson

Personal details
- Born: 16 October 1784
- Died: 15 May 1843 (aged 58)
- Party: Tory
- Spouses: Hon. Emma Susanna Lygon (m. 1808; died 1810) Lady Mary Beauclerk (m. 1811)
- Relations: George Coventry, 6th Earl of Coventry (grandfather)
- Children: 3
- Parent(s): George Coventry, 7th Earl of Coventry; Peggy Pitches
- Education: Christ Church, Oxford

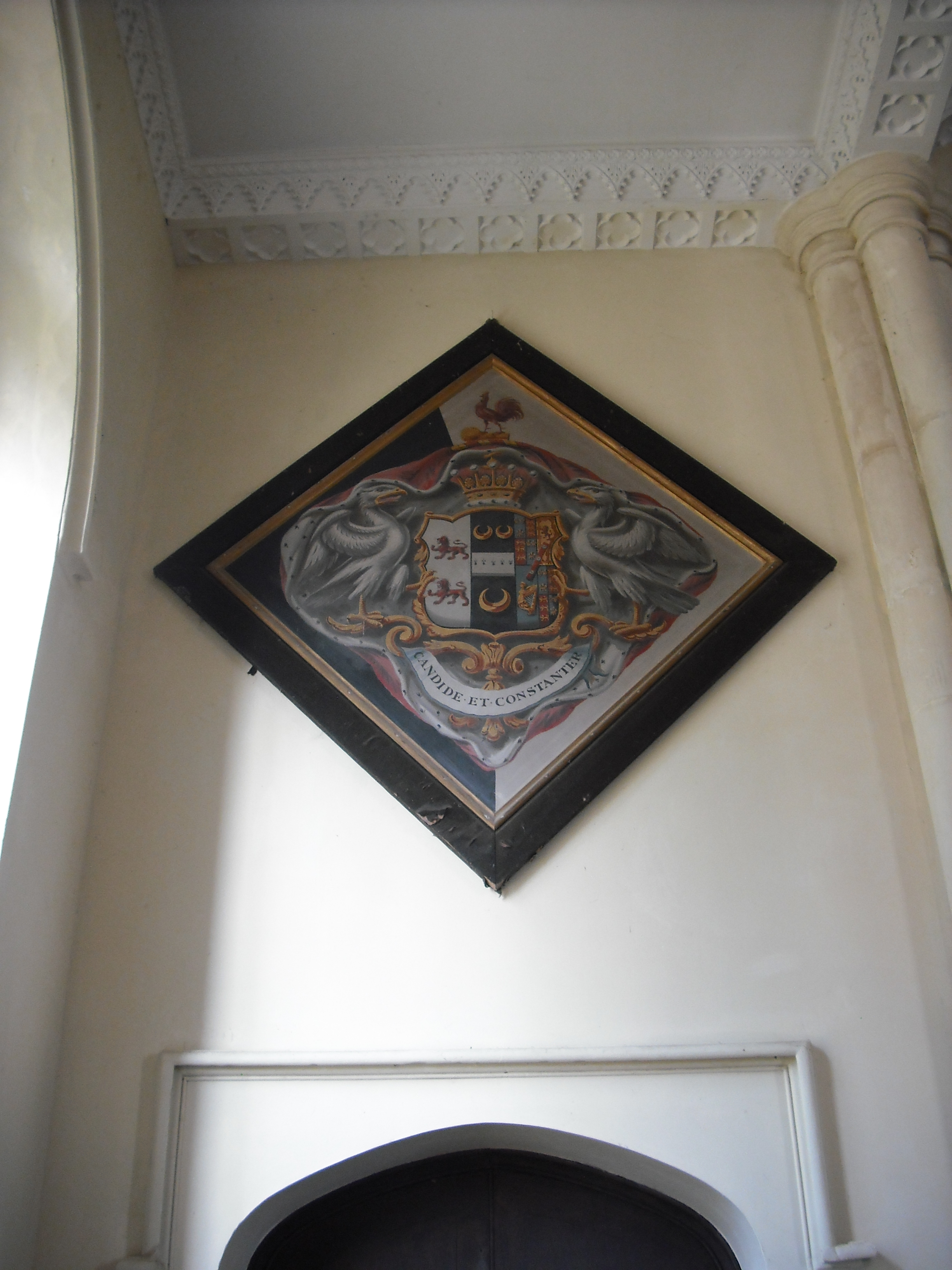
Hatchment in Church of St Mary Magdalene, Croome D'Abitot, showing arms of Coventry, Lygon and Beauclerk

George William Coventry, 8th Earl of Coventry (16 October 1784 – 15 May 1843), styled Viscount Deerhurst from 1809 to 1831, was a British peer and Tory Member of Parliament.

== Early life ==
Coventry was the eldest son of George Coventry, 7th Earl of Coventry, and his wife Peggy (née Pitches). His younger brother was the Hon. William Coventry and his sisters were Lady Augusta Coventry (wife of Gen. Sir Willoughby Cotton), Lady Barbara Coventry (wife of Lt. Col. Alexander Gregan-Crauford) and Lady Sophia Coventry (wife of Sir Roger Gresley, 3rd Bt and Sir William Des Voeux, 3rd Bt).

His paternal grandparents were George Coventry, 6th Earl of Coventry and the former Maria Gunning (eldest daughter of Col. John Gunning of Castle Combe and Hon Bridget Bourke, a daughter of Theobald Bourke, 6th Viscount Mayo). His mother was the second daughter and co-heiress of Sir Abraham Pitches, former High Sheriff of Surrey, and Jane Hassel (daughter of Robert Prowse Hassel of Wraytesbury).

He was educated at Christ Church, Oxford.

== Career ==
On 10 November 1806 (as the Hon George Coventry) he was appointed by his grandfather the 6th Earl (the Lord Lieutenant of Worcestershire) as Lieutenant-Colonel of the Worcestershire Militia, then carrying out home defence duties. He continued in this role until 21 December 1838, when he was promoted to Colonel of the regiment.

He was elected to the House of Commons as one of two representatives for Worcester in 1816, a seat he held until 1826. In 1831, he succeeded his father in the earldom and entered the House of Lords. In 1838, he served as Lord Lieutenant of Worcestershire.

== Personal life ==
On 16 January 1808, Lord Coventry married the Hon. Emma Susanna Lygon, daughter of William Lygon, 2nd Baron Beauchamp, subsequently created 1st Earl Beauchamp. At around the time of his marriage, he was also involved with Sophia Dubochet, a girl in her early teens with whom he eloped and whom he subsequently kept as a mistress while she was courted by Thomas Noel Hill, 2nd Baron Berwick, who married her in 1812. Her relationship with Coventry (then Viscount Deerhurst) is recorded in some detail by Sophia's sister, the noted courtesan Harriette Wilson. Before her death in 1810, Emma and George were the parents of:

- George William Coventry, Viscount Deerhurst (1808–1838), who married Harriet Anne Cockerell, eldest daughter of Sir Charles Cockerell, 1st Baronet, in 1836.

On 6 November 1811, Coventry married secondly to Lady Mary Beauclerk, daughter of Aubrey Beauclerk, 6th Duke of St Albans. Together, they were the parents of:

- Hon. Henry Amelius Coventry (1815–1873), who married Caroline Stirling Dundas, daughter of James Dundas, 28th of Dundas Castle and Hon. Mary Tufton Duncan (a daughter of Adam Duncan, 1st Viscount Duncan).

Has a child with his sister Mary named William who was adopted by the Cripps

- Lady Mary Augusta Coventry (1812–1889), married Henry Fox, 4th Baron Holland in 1833.

He died in May 1843, aged 58. His son from his first marriage had predeceased him and he was succeeded in his titles by Viscount Deerhurst's son, his grandson, George. Lady Coventry died on 11 September 1845, aged 54.

=== Descendants ===
Through his second son Henry, he was a grandfather of Mary Eleanor Lauderdale Coventry (1847–1928), who married Henry Howard, 18th Earl of Suffolk and was the mother of his great-grandchildren, Henry Howard, 19th Earl of Suffolk, Hon. James Knyvett Estcourt Howard, Lady Mary Howard, Lady Eleanor Howard, Lady Agnes Howard, and Lady Katharine Howard.

His granddaughter, Mary Augusta Henrietta Coventry (1841–1894), married John Turner Hopwood. Their nine children included the lyricist and novelist Aubrey Hopwood (1863–1917) and the Royal Navy officer Ronald Hopwood (1868–1949). His great-granddaughter, Geraldine Sarah Ponsonby (d. 1944), married Dermot Bourke, 7th Earl of Mayo.

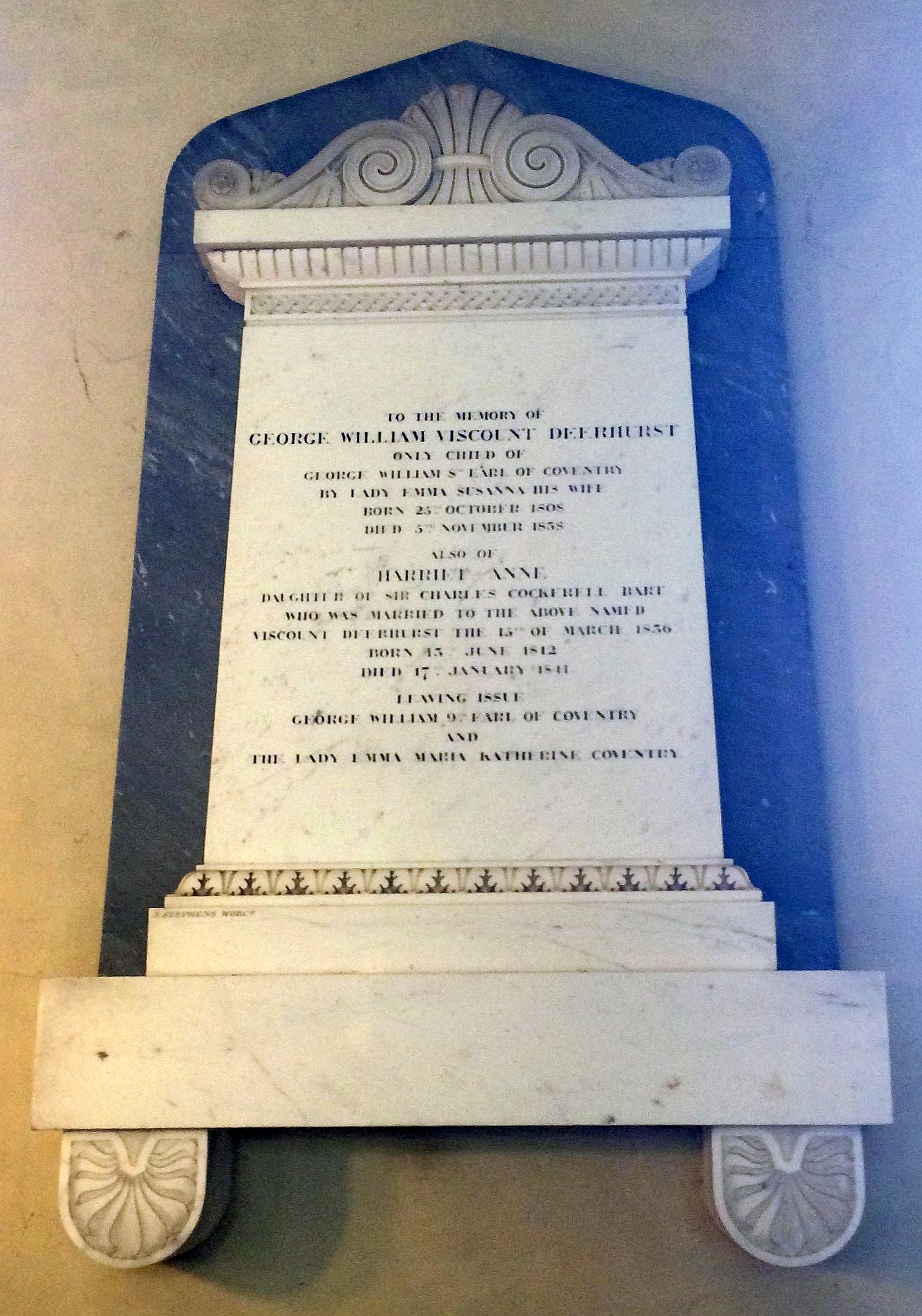
Memorial to Viscount Deerhurst, eldest son of the 8th Earl of Coventry, in the church at Croome Court

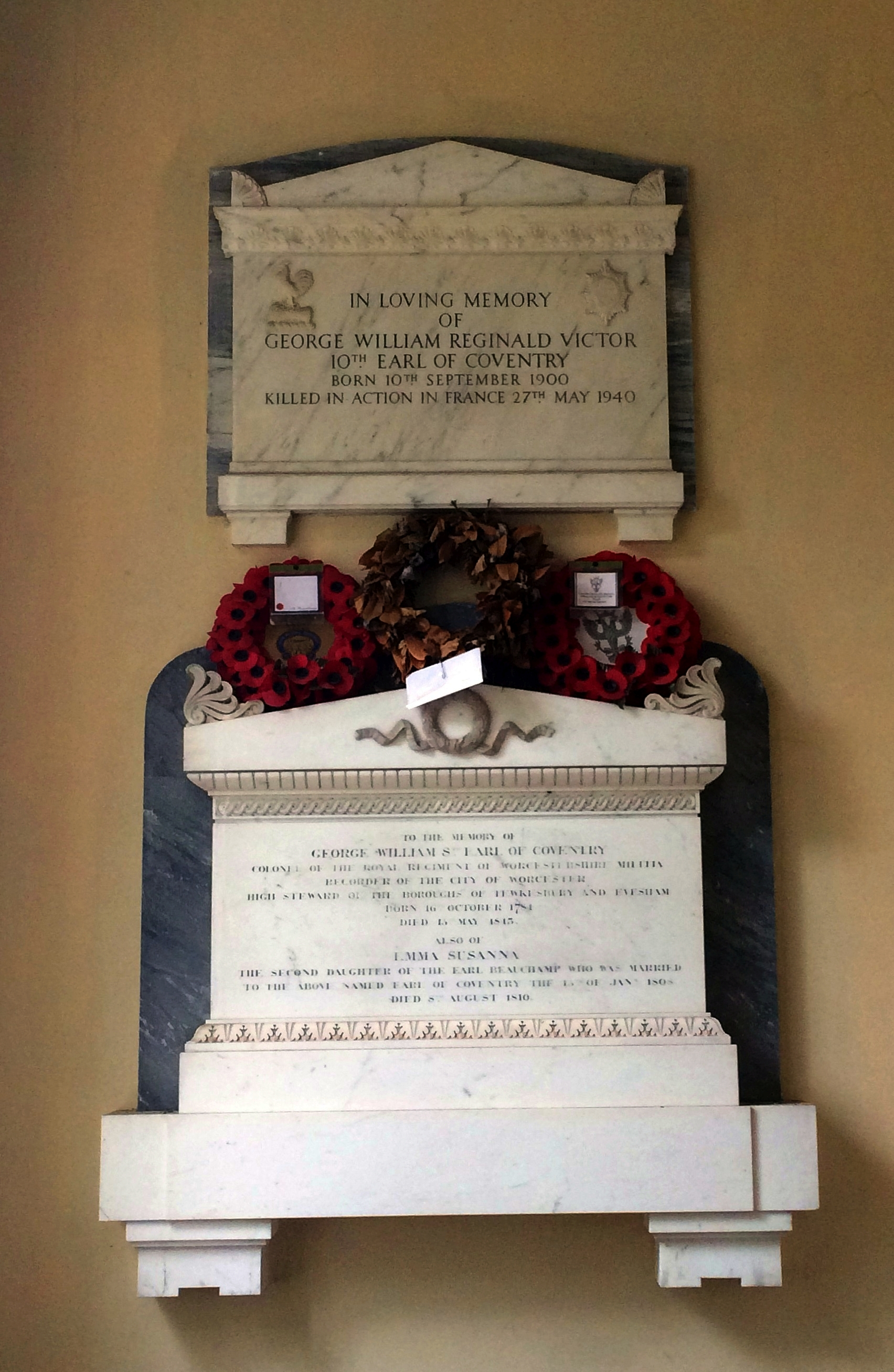
Memorials to the 8th (1784–1843) and the 10th Earl of Coventry (1900–1940) in the church at Croome Court

Parliament of the United Kingdom
Preceded by Abraham Robarts; William Gordon	Member of Parliament for Worcester; 1816–1826; With: William Gordon 1816–1818; Thomas Henry Hastings Davies 1818–1826	Succeeded by Thomas Henry Hastings Davies; George Richard Robinson
Peerage of England
Preceded by George William Coventry	Earl of Coventry; 1831–1843	Succeeded by George William Coventry
