= James Menteath =

Rev James Menteath, in later life James Stuart Menteath of Closeburn (c. 1718–1802) was a Scottish clergyman of the Church of England, and friend of Adam Smith.

== Early life ==
Born at Burrowine, Perthshire (now in Fifeshire) around 1718, he was son of William Menteath of Burrowine. He matriculated at the University of Glasgow in 1732. He then matriculated at Balliol College, Oxford on 9 April 1736, graduating B.A. 1739, M.A. 1742. He was supported there from 1736 by a Snell Exhibition, which he vacated in 1747.

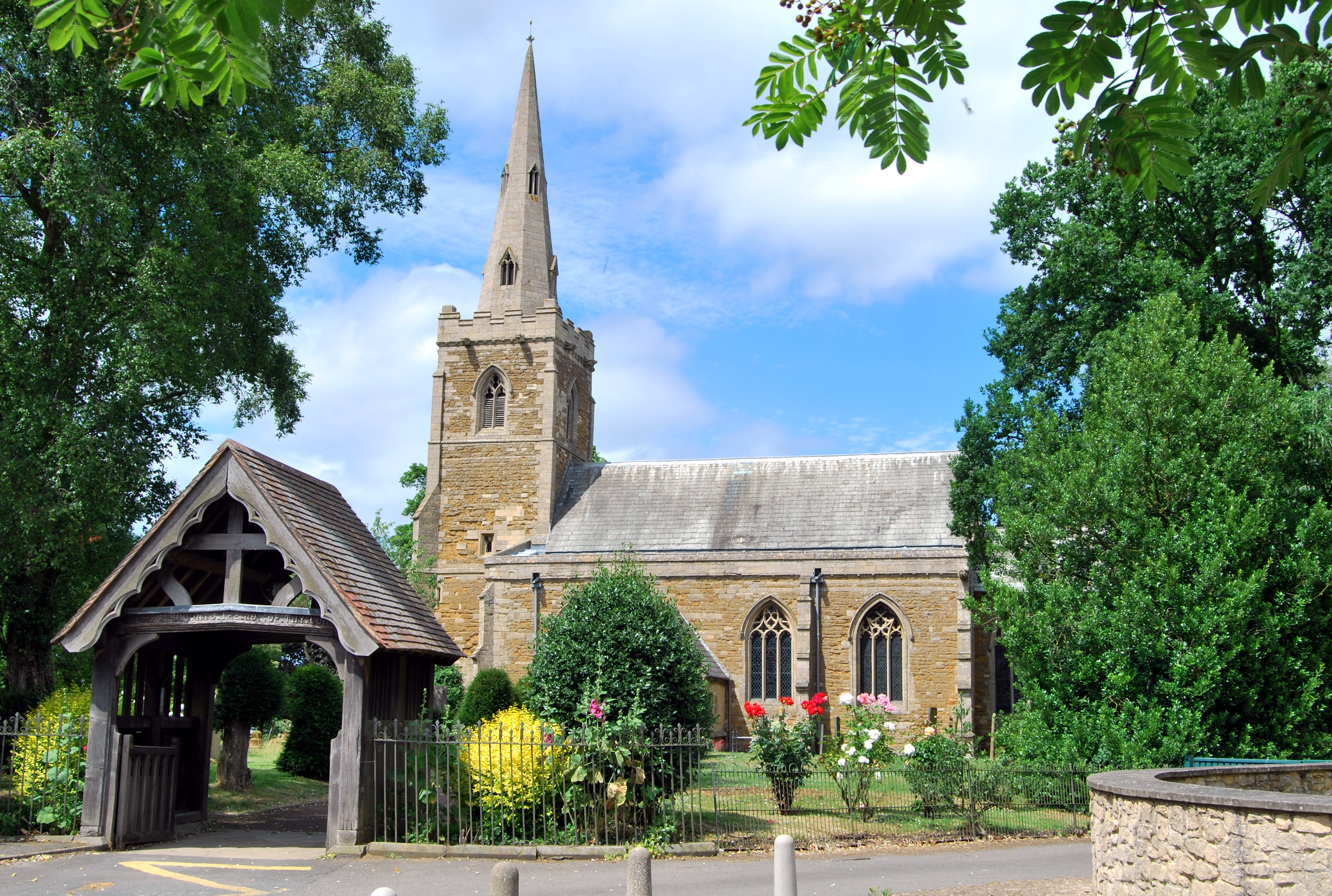
All Saints Church, Barrowby, today

== Parish priest in England ==
Menteath took holy orders in the Church of England, being ordained deacon in 1740, priest in 1741. He shortly became a curate at Adderbury in Oxfordshire, where John Cox was vicar. He was rector at Bishop's Cleeve, from 1754. He then moved on, as rector of All Saints Church, Barrowby in Lincolnshire, in 1759. He owed the Barrowby living to Sackville Tufton, 8th Earl of Thanet.

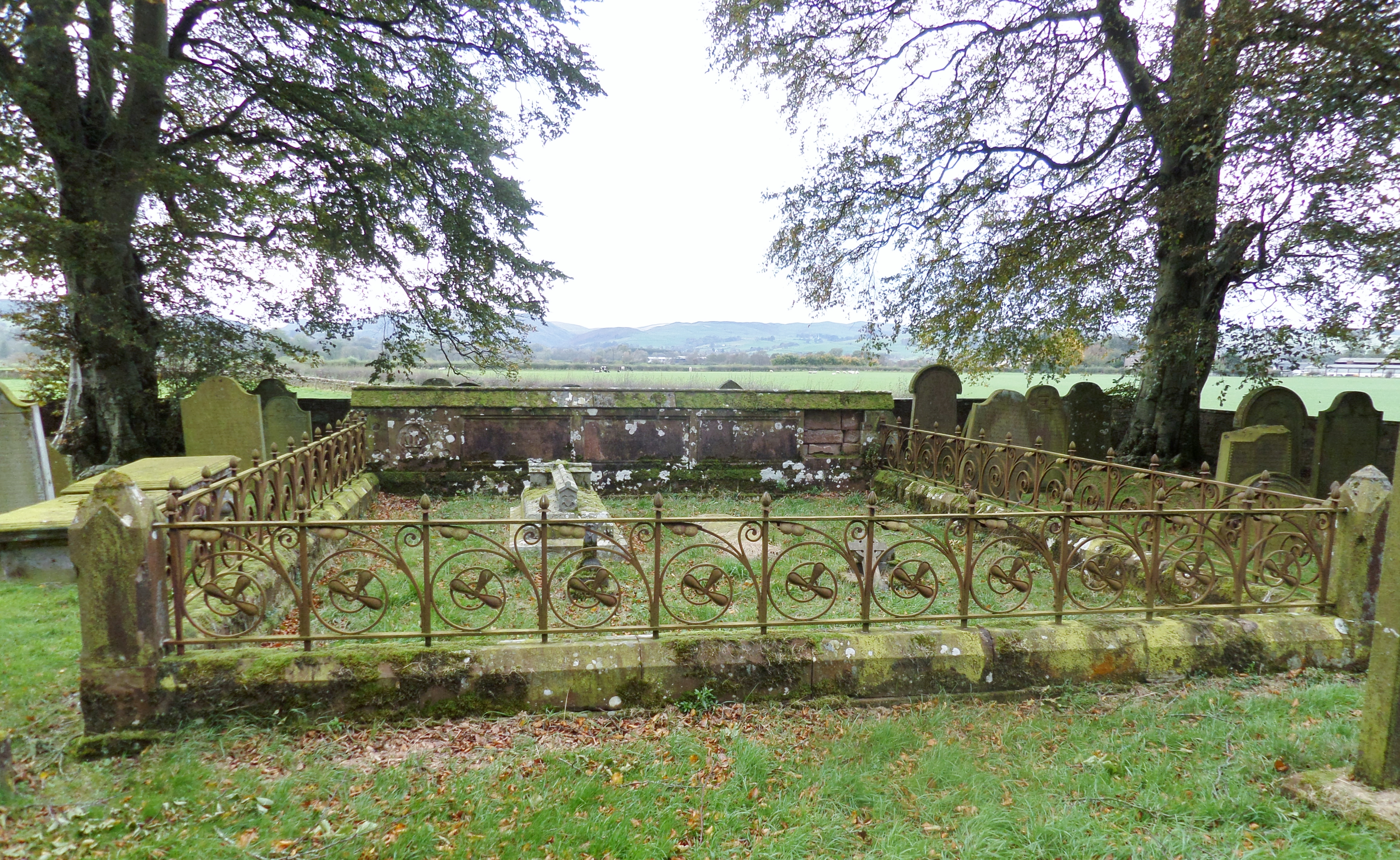
Burial ground of the Menteaths of Closeburn at Dalgarnock.

Sanderson Miller of Radway in Warwickshire cultivated a number of clerical friends with Oxford educations, including Richard Jago and William Talbot of Kineton, as well as Menteath. A statue of Caractacus by James Lovell was commissioned by Lord North as a gift to Miller, for his tower on Edge Hill; it was modelled from Menteath. After a number of breakdowns, Miller was put into the hands of Francis Willis for treatment for his mental illness. While under Willis, he wrote a digressive Memoir of Menteath, dated from internal evidence to the years 1772–4.

Menteath appears in Miller's Memoir as "Jacobus Montaltus", a Latinised version of his name. Annotations by Menteath state that he and Miller were close friends, from 1737 (when they overlapped at the University of Oxford, at St Mary Hall) to 1780 when Miller died. The Memoir states that Menteath was promised the Barrowby living from 1745, by Sackville Tufton, 7th Earl of Thanet and his wife; the incumbent was Thomas Wood, who held it from 1732 to 1759. This was also the year of the Jacobite Rebellion, in which Menteath became embroiled, on a visit to his family.

In 1770 Menteath assumed the additional surname of Stuart "for himself and his posterity."

== Later life ==
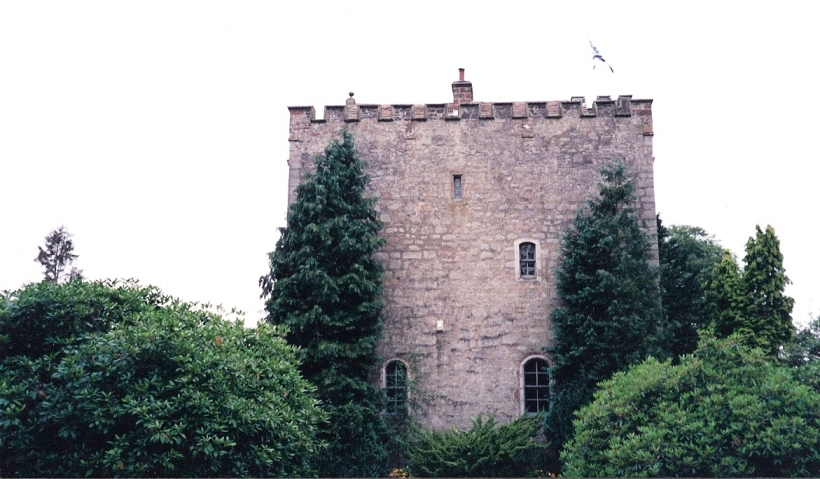
Closeburn Castle, a tower house in the Scottish Borders, today

In 1783 Menteath purchased Closeburn Castle in Dumfriesshire, from Sir Thomas Kirkpatrick. On his moving north in 1785, Adam Smith wrote to Menteath describing him as his oldest friend, outside his extended family. They knew each other from Kirkcaldy, in Fifeshire and Smith's home in early life.

Menteath died 15 July 1802.

== Family ==
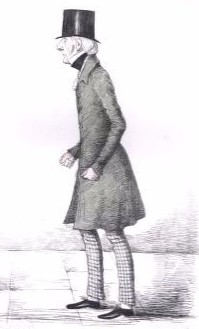
Sir Charles Granvill Stuart-Menteth, 1st Baronet, 1847 engraving

Menteath married, 15 April 1765, Catherine Maria (died 14 August 1793) daughter of the Rev. Granville Wheler, of Otterden Place, Kent, by his wife Lady Catherine Maria Hastings, daughter of Theophilus Hastings, 7th Earl of Huntingdon. Their son Charles Granville Stuart Menteath of Closeburn and Mansfield, born 12 May 1769, was created Baronet on 11 August 1838, and died 3 December 1847. He is also known as Sir Charles Granville Stuart-Menteth, 1st Baronet. His eldest son became Sir James Stuart-Menteth, 2nd Baronet. The Closeburn estate passed out of the family in 1852.
