= Closeburn Castle =

Tower house in Scotland

Coordinates: 55°12′41″N 3°43′07″W

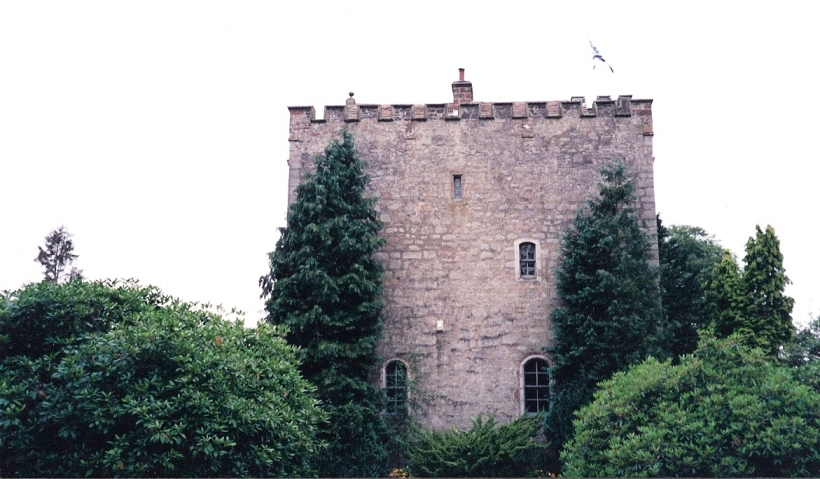
- The castle in 2006

Closeburn Castle is a privately owned tower house, probably of the 14th century, but possibly older, and is one of the oldest continually inhabited houses in Scotland. The castle is located 1 km east of the village of Closeburn, in the historical county of Dumfriesshire, 2 km south-east of Thornhill, in Dumfries and Galloway, Scotland.

== History ==
The Kirkpatrick family was confirmed in their lands of Closeburn in 1232 by Alexander II. The tower house was probably built in the late 14th century, although some sources give a date as early as 1180 or as late as 1420. Sir Roger de Kirkpatrick was with Robert the Bruce at Dumfries in 1306, and assisted in the murder of John "the Red" Comyn. His son, also Sir Roger, commanded a force which recaptured Caerlaverock and Dalswinton castles from the English in 1355. He was then murdered by Sir James Lindsay at Caerlaverock in 1357.

In 1685, the Kirkpatricks' loyalty to Charles I was rewarded with a baronetcy. In the 17th century, the Kirkpatricks moved out of Closeburn to an adjacent, newly built manor house. However, this burned down in 1748, with the castle sustaining some damage. Renovations were made to the castle, and the family moved back in. The Kirkpatrick family finally sold Closeburn in 1783 to a local minister, James Stewart-Menteith. It has since changed hands several times, but is still occupied as a dwelling house.

== The Castle ==
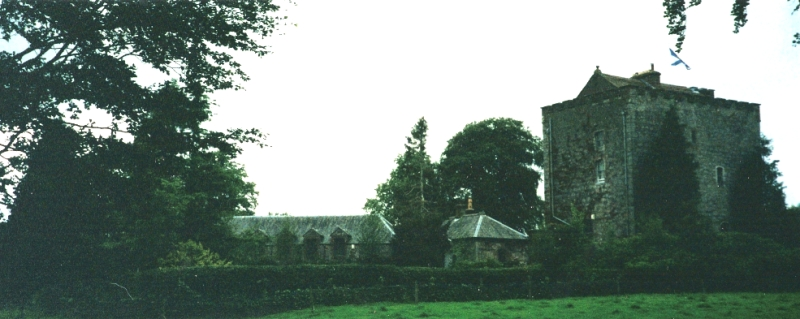
Closeburn Castle, with later additions to the left

The original tower house was built on a promontory in a now drained loch. It was surrounded by a timber palisade, and later, a stone walled barmkin, or defensive courtyard, with round towers at the corners. The tower is approximately 14.5 m by 10.5 m, and rises 15 m to a flush parapet. Inside, a vaulted basement incorporated a prison. A hall above is also vaulted, with a third vault at roof level enclosing three upper storeys. The first-floor entrance to the tower still retains its iron yett, a defensive gate of metal bars.

The barmkin was presumably demolished to make way for the 17th century manor. When the family returned to the tower in the mid 18th century, the upper chambers were subdivided, and windows were enlarged to improve the standard of accommodation. The crenellations were added to the parapet around this time. Further renovations were carried out in the 19th century; a single storey extension was added to the south west, and a red sandstone porch was added to the north side after 1856. It is possible that the architect David Bryce was responsible for the additions.
