= Waterfield =

Waterfield is an English surname. Notable people with the surname include:

== People ==
- Bob Waterfield (1920–1983), American football player
- Fred Waterfield (born 1952), cousin and accomplice of serial killer David Alan Gore
- George Waterfield (1901–1988), English association footballer
- Giles Waterfield (1949–2016), British novelist, art historian and curator
- Gordon Waterfield (1903–1987), English journalist
- Harry Lee Waterfield (1911–1988), Lieutenant Governor of Kentucky
- Sir Henry Waterfield (1837–1913), British civil servant
- Lina Waterfield (1874–1964), French-born English author
- Margaret Helen Waterfield (1863–1953), English artist
- Michael Caborn-Waterfield (1930–2016), British businessman
- Michael Waterfield (born 1941), British biochemist
- Percival Waterfield (1888–1965), English civil servant
- Peter Waterfield (born 1981), British diver
- Reginald Waterfield (1867–1967), Anglican priest
- Reginald Lawson Waterfield (1900–1986), British haematologist
- Rhys Frake-Waterfield, British film director
- Richard A. Waterfield (1939–2007), member of the Texas House of Representatives
- Robin Waterfield (born 1952), British classical scholar

== Fictional characters ==
- Victoria Waterfield, companion of the Second Doctor in British TV series Doctor Who

== See also ==
- R v Waterfield, a leading English case on common law police powers
