= The Education of Pan =

Lost painting by Luca Signorelli

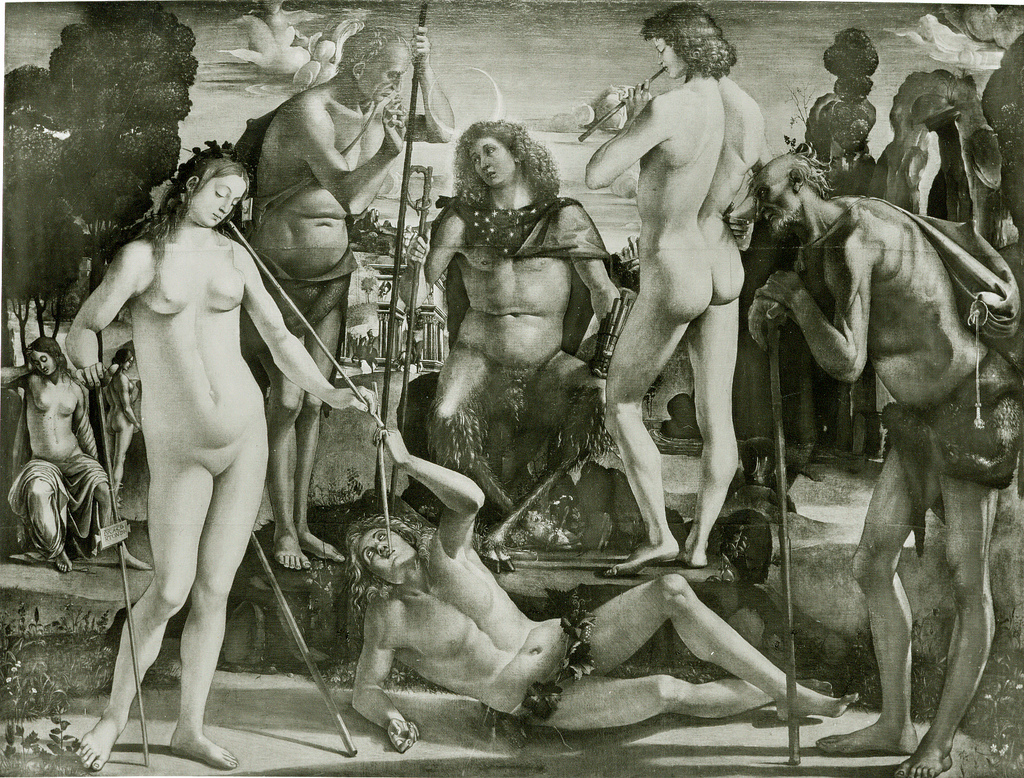
Black and white photograph of the work.

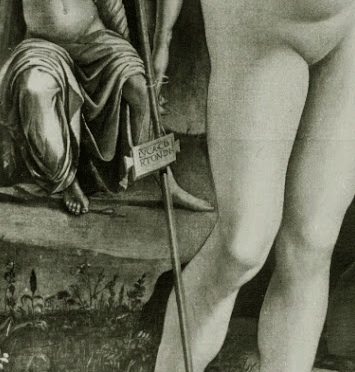
Cartellino with Signorelli's signature.

The Education of Pan is a lost c.1490 tempera on canvas painting by Luca Signorelli. It was in the Kaiser-Friedrich-Museum in Berlin but was moved to the Flakturm Friedrichshain during the Second World War. There it was destroyed in a fire in May 1945 just after the end of the war.

It was the most significant commission by Lorenzo the Magnificent and was described by Giorgio Vasari as a painting of "nude gods" painted for him by Signorelli. It was recorded at the Palazzo Pitti in 1687 and then moved to the Palazzo Corsi near San Gaetano in 1865.

The painting appears in Lina Waterfield's autobiography Castle in Italy, where she claims that ownership of the painting passed through her family in the late 19th Century before ending up in the Kaiser-Friedrich-Museum (later the Bode Museum) in Germany.

== Sources ==
- "Article at the palazzo Medici-Riccardi".
