= Alexander Cornewall Duff-Gordon =

British civil servant and peer

- Born: 3 February 1811
- Died: 27 October 1872 (aged 61)
- Spouse: Lucie Austin (m. 1840; died 1869)
- Children: 4, including Janet
- Father: William Duff-Gordon
- Relatives: Alexander Gordon (grandfather); George Cornewall (grandfather); Lina Waterfield (granddaughter)

Sir Alexander Cornewall Duff-Gordon, 3rd Baronet (3 February 1811 – 27 October 1872) was a British civil servant and Baronet of Halkin. He was the husband of Lucie, Lady Duff-Gordon, a translator and writer best known for her correspondence on Egypt.

== Early life ==
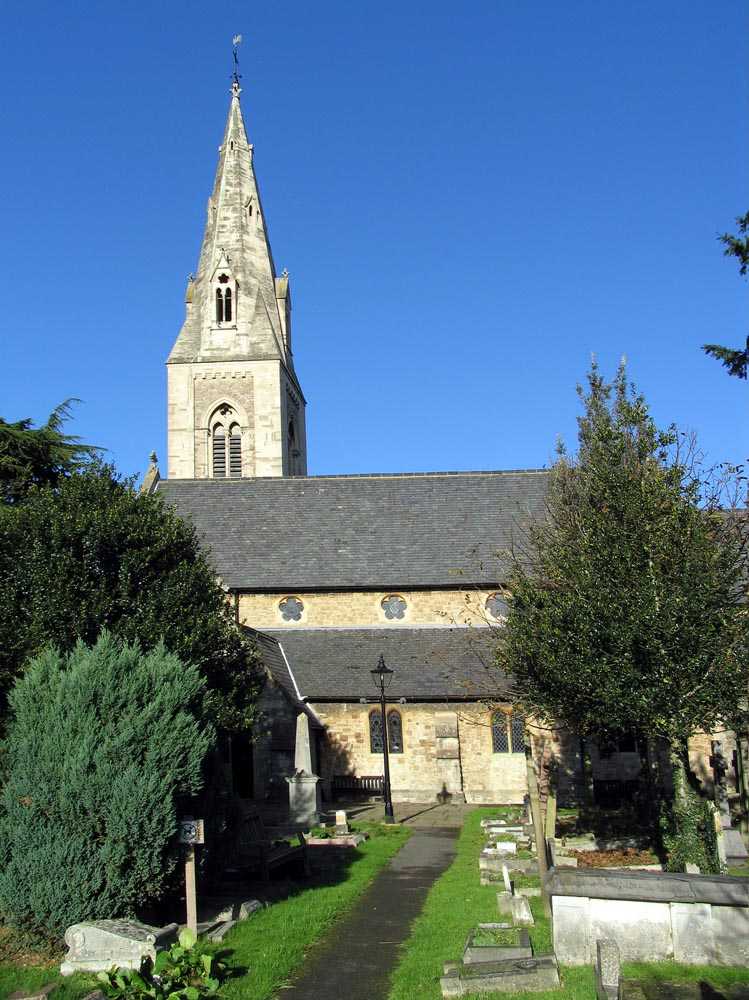
St Dunstan's Church, Cheam

Duff-Gordon was born on 3 February 1811 the eldest son of Sir William Duff-Gordon, a younger son of the House of Aberdeen and his mother, Caroline, who was a daughter of Sir George Cornewall. He succeeded to his father's title on 8 March 1823.

== Marriage ==
At a society ball at Lansdowne House, the London home of the Marquess of Lansdowne, in 1838, he met Lucie Austin who was ten years his junior. Lucie was the daughter of literary translator Sarah Austin and legal philosopher John Austin. The couple married on 16 May 1840 in Kensington Old Church, despite the initial objections of his mother over Lucie's lack of a dowry.

Following their marriage, the couple lived at 8 Queen Square, Westminster, a house with a statue of Queen Anne at one end, since renumbered as 15 Queen Anne's Gate. Here a circle of friends and acquaintances frequently met: Lord Lansdowne, Lord Monteagle, Caroline Norton, Dickens, Thackeray, Elliot Warburton, Tom Taylor, Tennyson, Alexander Kinglake, and Henry Taylor were habitués.

Every foreigner of talent and renown regarded the house as a centre of interest. On one occasion, Leopold von Ranke was among the visitors. Following the birth of their son, Maurice, in 1849, Lady Duff-Gordon began to succumb to tuberculosis, and by the winter of 1861, she had become so ill that her doctors advised her to travel to a warmer, drier climate.

After trying Ventnor for two winters, she left her husband and children in England and went on a voyage to the Cape of Good Hope in 1860. On her return to England, she was persuaded to go to Eaux Bonnes in the autumn of 1862, which reportedly harmed her health.

Lady Duff-Gordon then visited the newly fashionable Egypt, leaving her husband and children behind in England. She reached Alexandria in October 1862 and, except for two short visits to England in 1863 and 1865, she remained there for her health and separated from her husband until her death in 1869.

== Career ==
Duff-Gordon was a clerk in the Treasury for many years and acted as private secretary to at least one Chancellor of the Exchequer. He became a senior clerk in the Treasury in 1854, and a Commissioner of Inland Revenue in 1856; he was also Assistant Gentleman Usher of the Privy Chamber to Her Majesty.

== Death ==
He died 27 October 1872, his will was probated 6 November, and was valued at less than £15,000.

Sir Alexander's gravestone is in the churchyard of St Dunstan's Church, Cheam, Surrey. It records "his beloved wife Lucie, only daughter of John and Sarah Austin, who died and was buried in Egypt." There is also an inscription regarding Sir Alexander and Lucie's youngest child, Urania, who was born in November 1858 and died on 22 September 1877. The inscription is, in some places, very difficult to read.

== Personal life ==
He and his wife had four children. Their daughter Janet Ann Ross was born in 1842 and died in 1927. Their second child was born in 1849 but died after only a few months of life. Their third child and only son Maurice (1849–1896) became Sir Maurice Duff-Gordon and succeeded to his father's title, becoming the 4th Baronet. Their fourth child, Urania, was born in 1858 and died on 22 September 1877.

His granddaughter, via Maurice, Caroline "Lina" Waterfield (1874–1964), became an author and foreign correspondent for The Observer. She was the mother of author Gordon Waterfield and grandmother of the historian Sir Antony Beevor.

Baronetage of the United Kingdom
Preceded by William Duff-Gordon	Baronet (of Halkin); 1823–1872	Succeeded by Maurice Duff-Gordon
