= Margaret Helen Waterfield =

English watercolour artist (1863-1953)

- Born: 1863; Shanklin, England
- Died: 1953 (aged 89–90)
- Occupation: Artist
- Relatives: Lina Waterfield (sister-in-law)

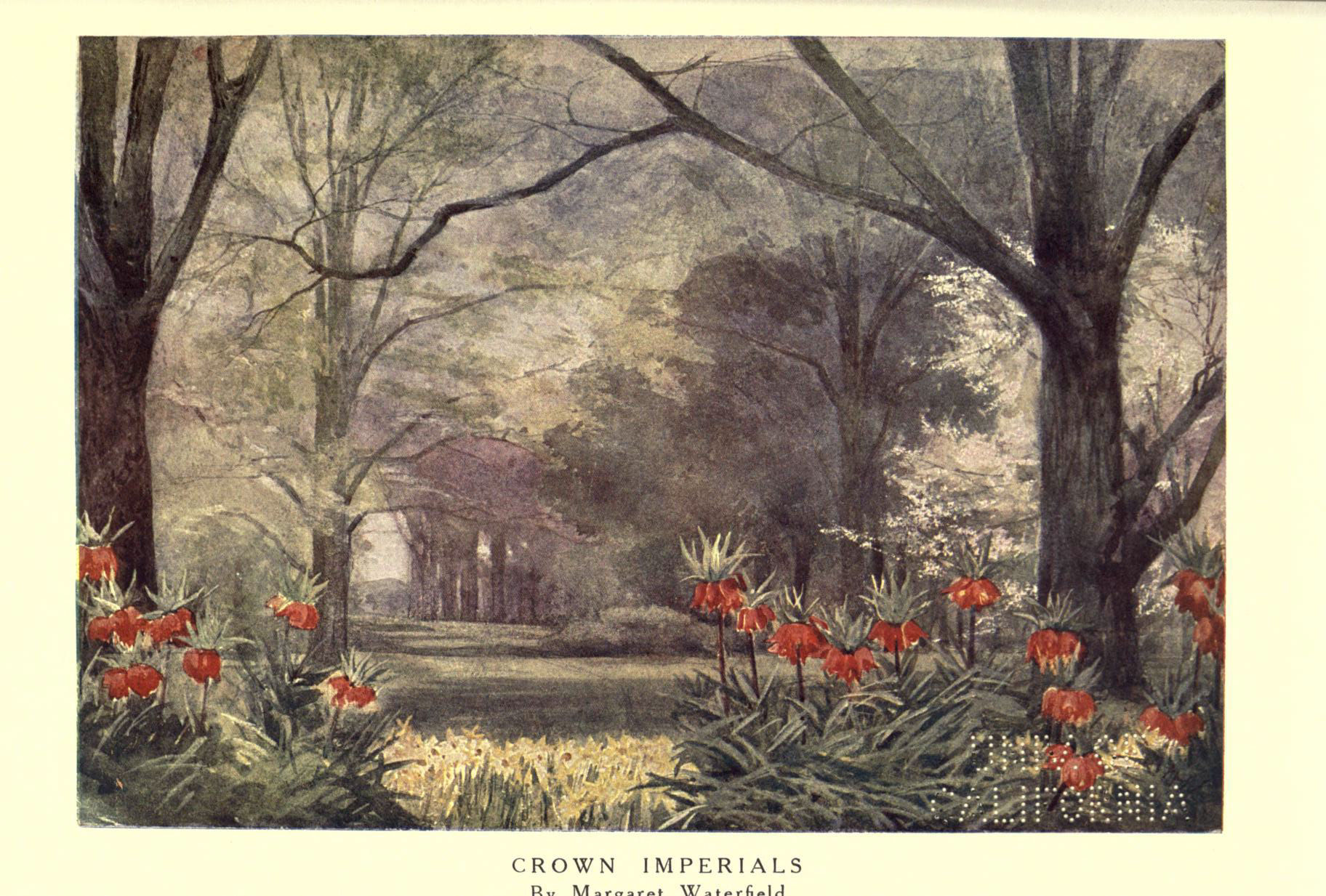
"Crown Imperials," a painting by Waterfield from Beautiful Flowers and How to Grow Them (1922)

Margaret Helen Waterfield (1863–1953), was an English artist best known for her watercolour paintings of flowers and other plants. She became a member of the Society of Women Artists in 1899 and lived in Canterbury, Kent, for several years. Her work has been displayed in the Royal Birmingham Society of Artists Gallery and the Walker Art Gallery in Liverpool.

== Early life and work ==
In 1863, Margaret Helen Waterfield was born in Shanklin, England, one of seven children. She lived with her mother and sister in Nackington, where she spent most of her time managing the garden and using it as an outdoor studio for her paintings.

Waterfield began exhibiting her work throughout the country before being elected an associate of the Royal Institute of Painters in Water Colours. She then traveled extensively around Europe, visiting Italy, Switzerland, Austria, Algeria, and across the Mediterranean.

After her younger brother, Aubrey Waterfield, married Lina Duff Gordon, Margaret lived for a time in their castle at Aula near Florence, where she painted the Tuscan scenery.

By 1914 Waterfield had returned to Nackington. She was absorbed by World War I activities, and allowed the house to be turned into a military hospital. Nackington was demolished soon after the war and the site was redeveloped for housing.

In 1918, Waterfield bought land near Port Lympne with a view of Romney Marsh to build her new home. She moved to Aldergate Wood at the age of 57 in 1921 and created a new garden there.

== Artwork and books ==
Waterfield's first book, Garden Colour, was published in 1905. It had a chapter for most months except for November, December, and January. She asked well-known garden authors to write an introductory chapter for each season. Theresa Earle covered spring, Eleanor Vere Boyle covered summer, and Rose Kinsley (daughter of Charles Kingsley) and Vicary Gibbs covered winter. There were three more chapters on roses and peonies written by other authors. Waterfield illustrated all of the chapters herself.

Most illustrations were created from life in Waterfield's garden at Nackington, while another group was created at Wisely. None of the book's illustrations resemble a typical cottage garden.

While there are no in-depth botanical studies, Waterfield included studies of small clusters of easily recognized flowers in their environment. The text and illustrations also showed complex gardening style changes. Flower Grouping in English, Scotch, and Irish Gardens, which credited her as the author of the notes, some chapters and 56 illustrations, was published in 1907.

Waterfield contributed illustrations to Horace J. Wright and Walter P. Wright's Beautiful Flowers and How to Grow Them. The book came out in two volumes in 1908 and 1909 and was re-issued in 1922.

Waterfield also provided all the illustrations for Corners of Grey Old Gardens, which was released in 1914.

Establishing Aldersgate Wood kept Waterfield busy and her next publication, in 1926, was four plates in a new edition of Rev. Nathaniel Paterson's The Manse Garden. She continued to paint and plant, but her work was no longer published or exhibited. In 1932 she was fined for "causing an obstruction with a motor car".

Waterfield died in 1953. After her death, Aldersgate Wood was passed to her niece who found around one hundred of Waterfield's paintings stored in a shed. The paintings were beyond repair.

The artist’s first piece to be offered at auction was Magnolia Conspicua – The Garden House at Saltwell at The Canterbury Auction Galleries in 2016.

== Bibliography ==
=== Written by Waterfield ===
- Garden Colour (1905) with Vicary Gibbs, Mrs. C.W. Earle
- Flower Grouping in English Scotch & Irish Gardens (1907)

=== Illustrated by Waterfield ===
- Beautiful Flowers and How to Grow Them by Horace J. Wright and Walter P. Wright (1922, co-illustrator)
