= Munsey's Magazine =

American magazine (1889–1929)

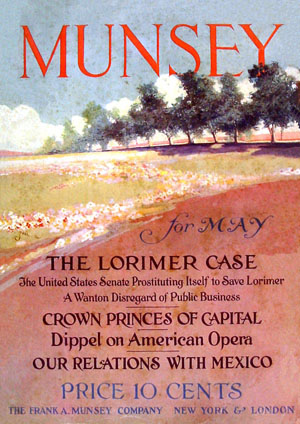
- Munsey's Magazine, May 1911
- Publisher: Frank A. Munsey Company
- First issue: February 2, 1889
- Final issue: October 1929
- Country: United States

Munsey's Magazine was an American magazine founded by Frank Munsey in 1889 as Munsey's Weekly, a humor magazine edited by John Kendrick Bangs. It was unsuccessful, and by late 1891 had lost $100,000 ($3.58 million in 2025). Munsey converted it into an illustrated general monthly in October of that year, retitled Munsey's Magazine and priced at twenty-five cents ($8.96 in 2025). Richard Titherington became the editor, and remained in that role throughout the magazine's existence. In 1893 Munsey cut the price to ten cents ($3.58 in 2025). This brought him into conflict with the American News Company, which had a near-monopoly on magazine distribution, as they were unwilling to handle the magazine at the price Munsey proposed. Munsey started his own distribution company and was quickly successful: the first ten cent issue began with a print run of 20,000 copies but eventually sold 60,000, and within a year circulation had risen to over a quarter of a million copies.

Munsey's Magazine included both fiction and non-fiction on art, music and the theatre, and celebrities. In 1893 Munsey became one of the first publishers to regularly depict a pretty young woman on the cover, and circulation was also boosted by the liberal use of illustrations. During the mid-1890s Munsey's often included images of nude and semi-nude women, though this became less common later in the decade. Circulation peaked at about 700,000 in 1897, and fluctuated thereafter until the 1910s, when it began to decline. The magazine became fiction-only in 1921. Many popular writers appeared in its pages, including O. Henry, H. Rider Haggard, Arthur Conan Doyle, Bret Harte, Max Brand, Edgar Rice Burroughs, P. G. Wodehouse, Joseph Conrad, and Ella Wheeler Wilcox. By 1924 circulation had dwindled to 64,000 and in 1929 the magazine was merged with Argosy, another of Munsey's magazines. The price cut from twenty-five cents to ten cents is considered by historians to have been the start of a revolution in magazine publishing. Before 1893, the bulk of most magazines' income came from the sale of subscriptions, though advertising was another source. Munsey's Magazine showed that it was possible to set a low price in order to increase circulation and attract sufficient advertising revenue to make a substantial profit. Other magazines, notably McClure's and Cosmopolitan, quickly followed suit, but it was not until 1904 that Everybody's Magazine managed to outstrip Munsey's circulation, reaching a figure of almost a million.

== Publication history ==
In 1882 Frank Munsey moved from Augusta, Maine, to New York City, intending to launch a children's magazine. His main investor soon pulled out, leaving Munsey without enough capital to publish the magazine himself; instead he persuaded an existing publisher, E. G. Rideout, to take it on, with Munsey as manager and editor. The magazine was titled The Golden Argosy, and the first issue was dated December 2, 1882. Rideout went bankrupt in early 1883, and Munsey took over as publisher.

The magazine was not initially profitable, and for years Munsey was under immense financial pressure. An advertising campaign in 1886 brought a surge in circulation to 115,000, (Note: Britt quotes a circulation of 150,000, but this appears to be an error as Munsey twice cites a circulation peak of 115,000 in his own account of events.) but this was temporary, and though Munsey experimented with The Golden Argosy, shortening the title to just The Argosy, and changing the page size and page count, he was unable to reverse the decline. In 1889 Munsey launched Munsey's Weekly, hoping that it would establish itself as profitable before The Argosy failed completely.

=== Munsey's Weekly ===
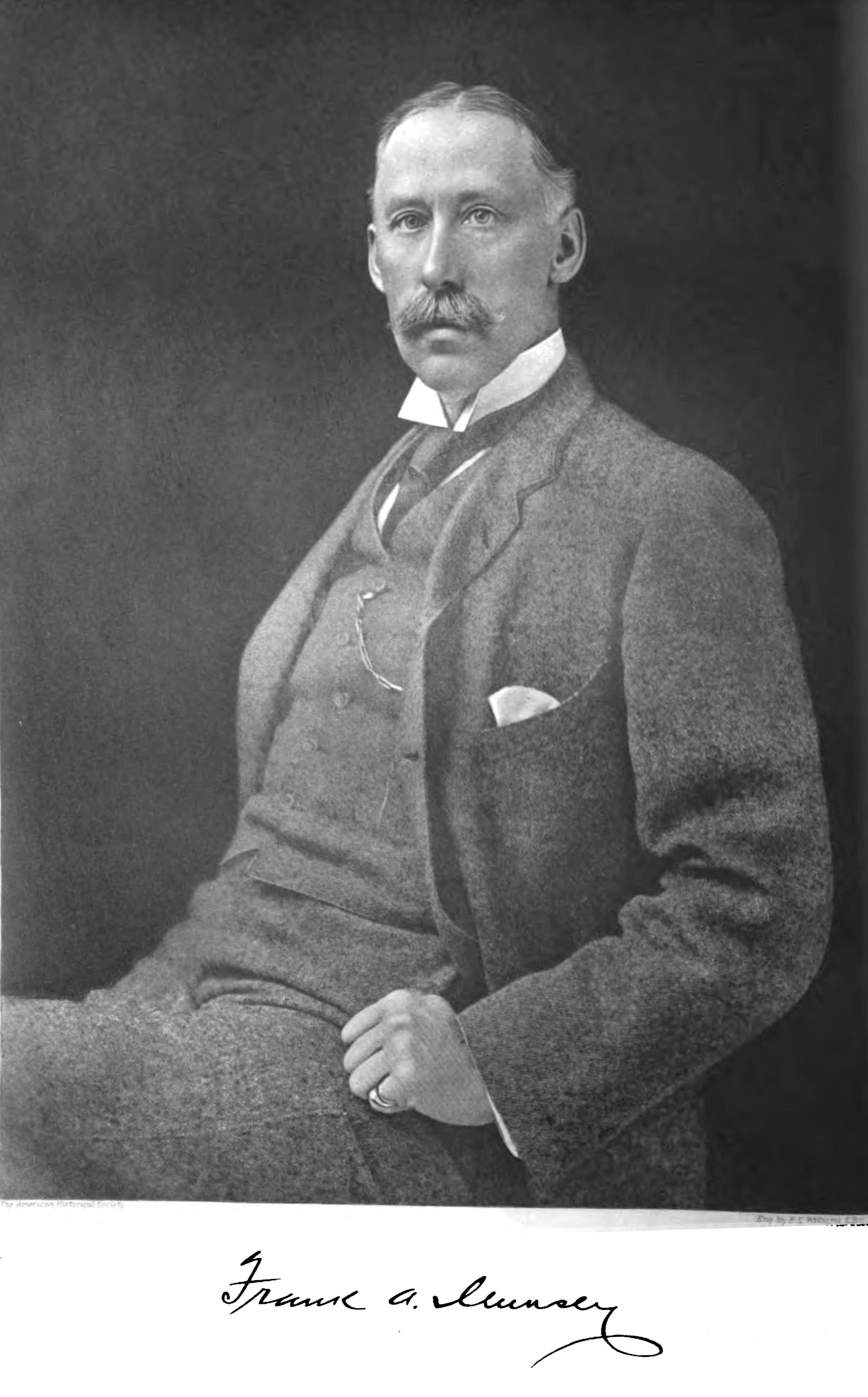
Frank Munsey

The first issue of Munsey's Weekly was dated February 2, 1889. It was 36 pages long, in quarto format, (Note: "Quarto" magazines were saddle-stapled and 8.5 in × 11 in (220 mm × 280 mm).) and priced at ten cents ($3.58 in 2025). The contents were satire and comedy: it was aimed at the same market as Life. Munsey hired John Kendrick Bangs as the founding editor; at the time Bangs was working for Harper's, but only for two afternoons a week, leaving him time to take on other responsibilities. At Harper's he was responsible for "The Editor's Drawer", a long-established humorous column. Bangs found Munsey to be difficult to work for; Bangs was used to a relaxed relationship with his previous publisher, but Munsey was constantly asking him about his work. By this time Munsey had written several novels for The Golden Argosy, and he submitted one, titled A Tragedy of Errors, to Bangs, who rejected it. Munsey insisted on running the story, and Bangs serialized it, but offered his resignation from the editorship. His last issue was in June. Bangs and Munsey remained on good terms, and Bangs subsequently sold work to Munsey, both for Munsey's Magazine (as the Weekly was later retitled) and for the Daily Continent, a short-lived tabloid version of the daily paper the New York Star, which Munsey acquired for a few months in 1891.

The magazine continued without a named editor for two more years, managed by the same team that was running The Argosy. In February 1890 Munsey bought another humorous weekly, Time (launched in 1884 as Tid-bits) and merged the subscription list with Munsey's Weekly. Munsey claimed that the acquisition would increase the Weekly's circulation from 26,000 to nearly 50,000. A review in Printers' Ink that month commented that none of the weekly papers paid well for syndicated writers, with Munsey's Weekly in the middle of the pack at $5 per column ($179 in 2025); only two magazines paid more than $5, and several paid less. Circulation stayed below 40,000, which was not enough to meet its costs, and in two and a half years the magazine lost over $100,000 ($3.58 million in 2025).

=== Munsey's Magazine ===
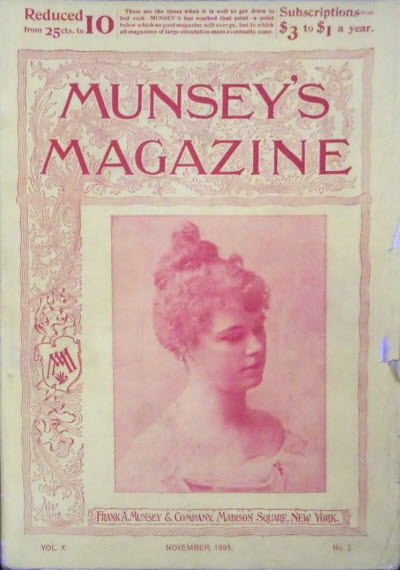
Cover of Munsey's Magazine for November 1893

In October 1891 Munsey changed the Weekly to a monthly, titled Munsey's Magazine, and Richard Titherington, one of Munsey's earliest employees, was given the editorship. The size was reduced from quarto to standard, (Note: "Standard" is the name given to the usual size of popular magazines of the era; typically 7 in × 10 in (180 mm × 250 mm) – the same size as "pulp", which is used for magazines printed on pulp paper.) with 96 pages per issue, and the price increased to twenty-five cents ($8.96 in 2025). The following April Munsey acquired The Epoch, a general magazine that had been launched in February 1887 by DeWitt Seligman as a ten-cent weekly, and merged it with Munsey's.

The change to a monthly schedule did not help the circulation of Munsey's. The financial pressure on Munsey intensified, but he was able to obtain a loan for $8,000 ($287,000 in 2025) through an old friend, John Fogler, who was at that time working for the First National Bank of Leavenworth in Kansas. In the Panic of 1893 the bank called in the loan, and Munsey offered Fogler half-ownership in his publishing company if he would take on the loan. Fogler declined and Munsey was forced to borrow the money elsewhere, at 18% interest.

Late in 1893 Munsey lowered the price of Munsey's to ten cents. This was not a completely new idea: the Ladies' Home Journal was priced at ten cents (and had been launched earlier in the decade at only five cents), though it was targeted at women rather than a general audience. Some of the established general magazines were also retreating from the older standard of twenty-five or thirty-five cents: McClure's was launched in June 1893 at fifteen cents, and Cosmopolitan cut its price to twelve and a half cents the next month. The Epoch, which Munsey had acquired in 1892 and merged with Munsey's, had cost ten cents, but there had been no successful general illustrated magazine at that price. The change brought Munsey into conflict with the American News Company (ANC), the distributor of almost all magazines of that time. ANC typically charged about five cents per copy for distributing a twenty-five or thirty-five cent magazine, but Munsey wanted a higher profit than this would give him. Initially ANC refused to handle the magazine at any price, but eventually they offered him four and a half cents. Munsey told them that his price was six and a half cents, and decided to bypass ANC. He notified about ten thousand dealers that ANC would not carry Munsey's Magazine, but that it could be had directly from the publisher for seven cents in New York plus the cost of shipping. Munsey knew many of the dealers, and added personal letters to the notification, but fewer than a hundred orders came in response.

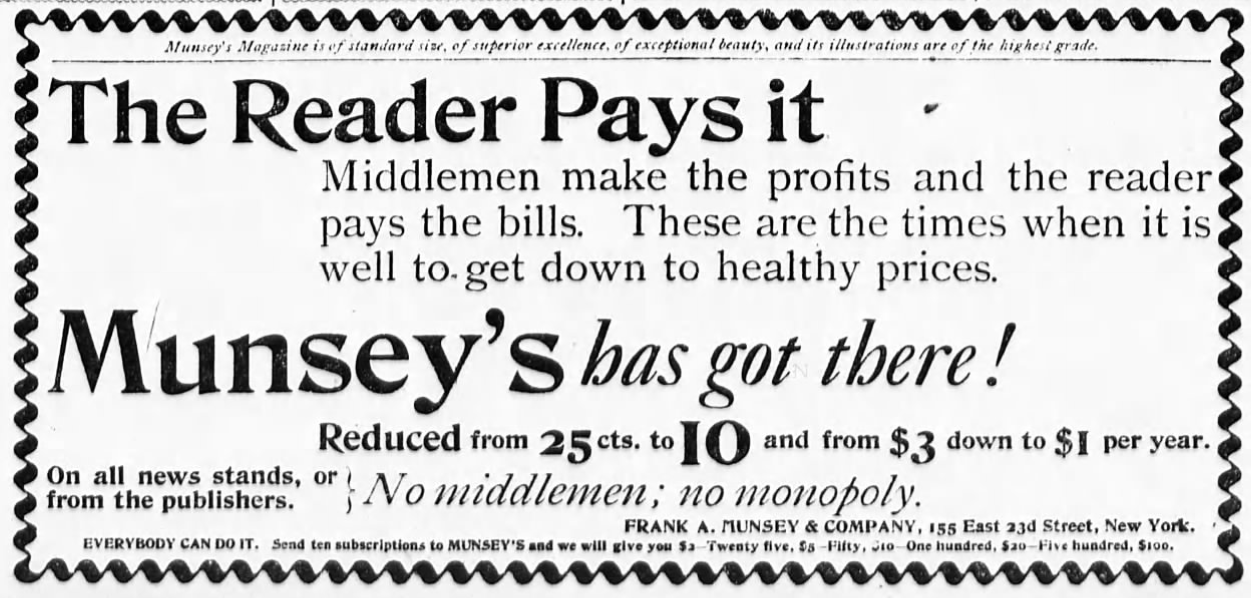
Advertisement in the New York Sun on October 7, 1893 for Munsey's Magazine at the ten cent price

At the suggestion of Charles Dana of the New York Sun, Munsey had already set up a distribution company, named Red Star News, and Dana now gave Munsey credit to run advertisements in the Sun for the magazine. Munsey wrote again to ANC and told them he was raising his price to seven cents. He did not know that ANC were now receiving thousands of orders for Munsey's from dealers: ANC sent someone to his office in response to his letter, asking for a price for 10,000 copies. They offered to pay five and three-quarter cents, but Munsey stuck to his seven-cents price. Munsey continued to advertise: the advertisements said "On all news stands", though at first this was far from the truth. A few orders began to come in, and within ten days all 20,000 copies had been sold. Two more printings brought the total to 60,000.

The advertisements and production costs brought Munsey's debts to $150,000 ($5.38 million in 2025). Munsey was purchasing paper on four-month credit, and the planned increase in the print run of each issue, prompted by the success of the first ten-cent issue, meant Munsey's indebtedness to his paper supplier would increase very rapidly. The paper supplier visited Munsey to say that he had talked to others in the trade, and was convinced that it was impossible for Munsey to make a success of a ten-cent magazine. Munsey was able to persuade him to extend more credit, and was quickly proved right as circulation soared over the next couple of years. The print run for November 1893 was 60,000; for December it was 100,000; for February 1894 it was 200,000; and in October 1894 it was 275,000. The half-million mark was reached in April 1895, and in 1897 circulation peaked at 700,000. Munsey's remained the circulation leader among general magazines until late 1904, when Everybody's Magazine, propelled by a muckraking (Note: "Muckraking" is the name given to the rise, in the early years of the twentieth century, of investigative journalism focused on political corruption.) series about finance, reached a circulation of almost a million. Advertising income per issue grew with the circulation, from under $3,000 ($112,000 in 2025) in October 1894 to over $30,000 in December 1895.

Rotary presses, developed in the 1860s and gradually improved over succeeding decades, began to be used for magazines in the 1880s, and in 1898 Munsey acquired one that could produce tens of thousands of copies an hour. Munsey's Magazine was not initially printed on pulp paper, and is not always regarded as a pulp magazine, but by 1900 it was using pulp paper for the signatures that did not include any illustrations, with better paper where photographs were reproduced. (Note: For example, The Adventure House Guide to the Pulps only lists issues from July 1909 onwards; Bookery Fantasy's Ultimate Guide to the Pulps only lists a selection of issues; and The Blood 'n' Thunder Guide to Pulp Fiction does not mention it.)

=== Later years ===
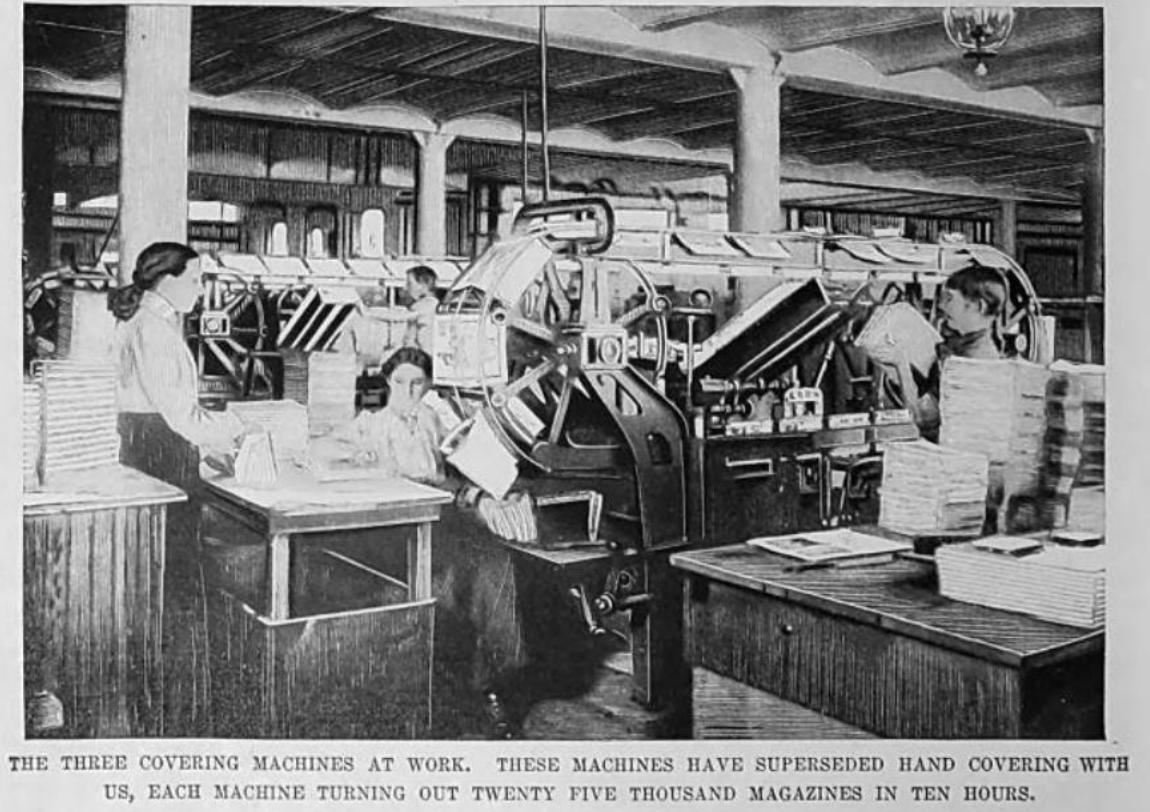
Covering machines used in 1899, from an article in Munsey's about how the magazine was produced

Circulation fell slowly from 1898 until 1905, but advertising revenue stayed strong. Munsey had built a modern printing plant which reduced costs, and most of the writers used, for both fiction and editorial material, were not expensive. Art was typically printed as halftones, which were cheaper than woodcuts, and paper prices were low. The result was a very profitable magazine. Three-color covers began with the November 1899 feature, but did not become the norm until 1903. Color covers required a flatbed printing process, but the rest of the magazine was printed on rotary presses; the covers were added to the rest of the magazine by hand until Munsey acquired machines to automate the process. From 1905 color began to appear on some internal pages as well, though the quality was often poor as the three colors were not always correctly aligned.

A campaign to increase circulation began in 1905, but from 1906, when circulation was almost back to 700,000, it fell steadily, down to 400,000 in 1912. By this time Munsey's businesses included a grocery store chain, newspapers, and many other magazines, and he was no longer closely involved in the day-to-day management of Munsey's. The price was raised from ten to fifteen cents in 1912. It was dropped again to ten cents in 1916 in an unsuccessful attempt to improve sales, and then raised to twenty cents in 1918. The page count, always higher than in the competing magazines, was increased again, sometimes to as many as 265 pages of non-advertising matter.

Circulation continued to drop, to 130,000 in 1920, and advertising sales fell. The Argosy had merged with another of Munsey's magazines, All-Story, in 1920, and was retitled Argosy All-Story Weekly; the combined magazine's circulation was 500,000, far ahead of Munsey's. Munsey's was switched to an all-fiction policy, like Argosy All-Story Weekly, in 1921, but circulation was down to 64,000 by 1924, the last year for which Munsey reported separate figures. Munsey died in 1925, and William Dewart took over as publisher. In 1929 the two magazines were reorganized: Munsey's became All-Story, and Argosy All-Story Weekly became simply Argosy. The last issue of Munsey's Magazine was dated October 1929.

== Contents and reception ==
=== 19th century ===
Munsey's Weekly included humorous pieces, but also a gossip column about politics and the society of Washington, D.C. Illustrators included Charles Howard Johnson, F. P. W. Bellew, E. L. Durand and A. E. Fenner. Frank Luther Mott, a magazine historian, describes the magazine as "a good paper of handsome appearance". In August 1887 Munsey had begun publishing a series of books for young people, titled Munsey's Popular Series for Boys and Girls, and he also began a series of cloth-bound books starting with his own The Boy Broker, which had been originally serialized in The Golden Argosy. Both these series were advertised in the Weekly.

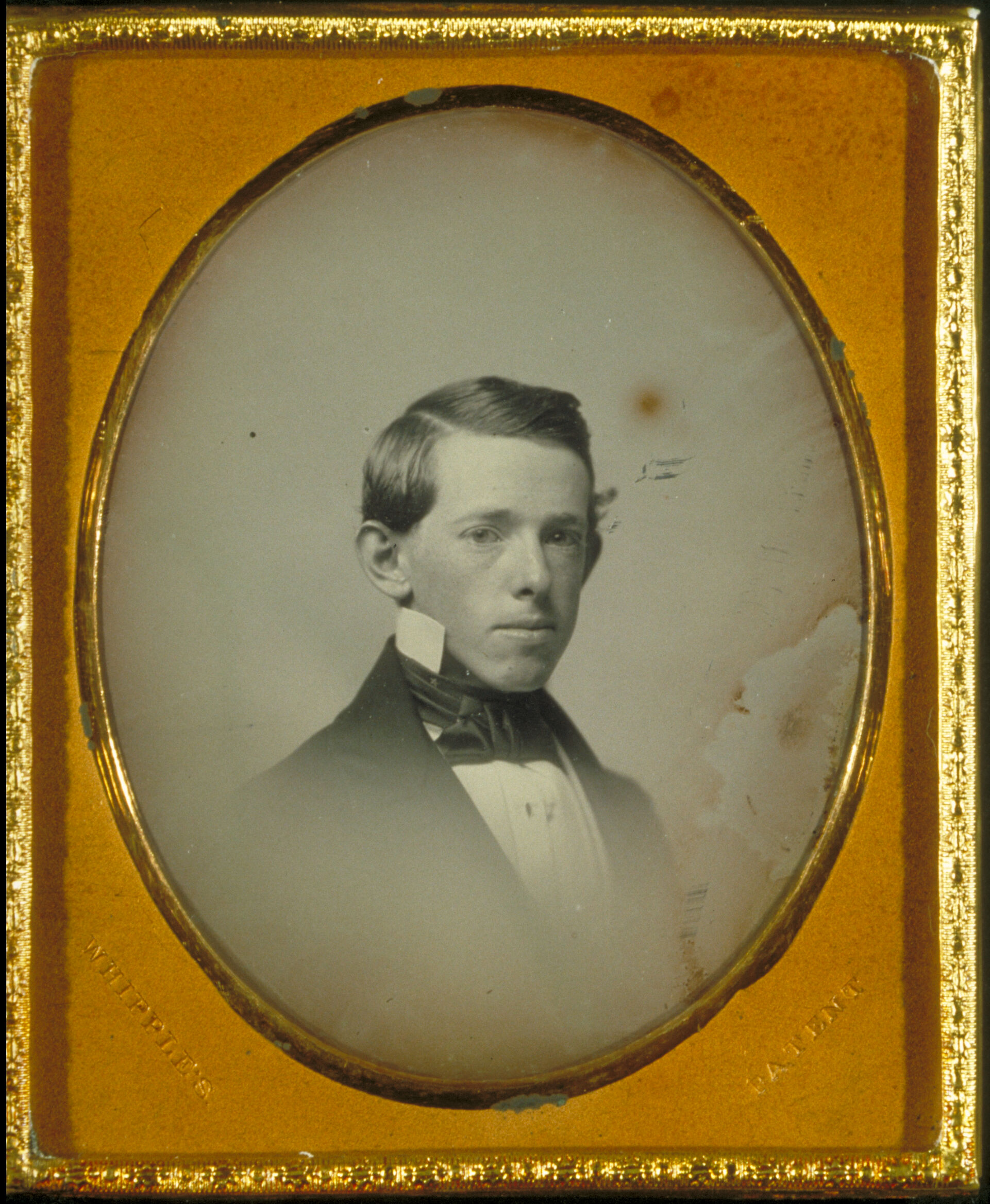
Horatio Alger in 1852

When the schedule changed to monthly, the magazine expanded to 96 non-advertising pages, with a few halftone illustrations. Initially the contributors were not well-known writers, except for Horatio Alger, whose novelette "A Fancy of Hers" appeared in the March 1892 issue. This was part of a run of issues in 1892 which each ran "a complete novel in each number", typically about fifty pages. Non-fiction departments included a theater column, "The Stage", written by C. Stuart Johnson; "Literary Chat"; a humor section called "Etchings", and editorial columns. Munsey's own novel Derringforth was part way through serialization when the first ten-cent issue appeared. In 1896 another well-known writer appeared: Hall Caine's The Christian, serialized from 1896 to 1897, was very popular. Other well-known authors followed, including F. Marion Crawford, H. Rider Haggard, Anthony Hope Hawkins, Myrtle Reed, and Grace MacGowan Cooke. Ella Wheeler Wilcox contributed poetry to the "Etchings" column. When Argosy began its fiction-only policy at the end of 1896, Munsey heavily re-used reprinted fiction from the magazine's earlier monthly issues. For example, 12 of the 18 contributions to the October 1896 Argosy were reprints from issues of Munsey's Magazine from between November 1891 and April 1893.

The magazine's covers were initially simply a table of contents, but in 1893 Munsey began putting a picture of a pretty girl on the cover of each magazine. He was the first publisher to do so regularly, and the policy probably gave the circulation another boost. In the middle of the 1890s Munsey's became known for printing images of "half-dressed women and undressed statuary", in the words of an editorial in The Independent. The magazine grew to 160 pages of reading matter, with an article on "Artists and Their Work", leading each issue, a natural vehicle for numerous halftones. Johnson's "The Stage" had its share of nudes, as did a department called "Types of Fair Women". "Literary Chat" and "Etchings" (now including poetry) were joined by "Impressions by the Way" (editorials). By the second half of the decade the use of nudes began to decline, but the reputation remained: in 1898 the Wilkes-Barre Public Library cancelled its subscription to Munsey's "because of the many illustrations ... which are on the nude order". However, the halftones were still an important part of the magazine's appeal. After the Spanish–American War began in April 1898, the regular lead article became "In the Public Eye" rather than "Artists and Their Work", but photographs, now on military topics, were still frequent.

Articles on famous people, both European aristocrats and American magnates and politicians, were common; these included a series on "Prominent American Families", and a series by Theodore Dreiser on American writers. New York Governor Theodore Roosevelt and U.S. House Speaker Thomas B. Reed each wrote articles for Munsey's in 1899, and a series called "My Favorite Novelist and His Best Book" brought contributions from Arthur Conan Doyle, Bret Harte, and Frank R. Stockton. Munsey argued that the short unsigned articles by his house staff, in departments such as "In the Public Eye", "The Stage", "In Vanity Fair" (society events and gossip), and "The World of Music", had "done more than anything else to individualize the magazine [and] to popularize it". Mott agrees, commenting that "Literary Chat" and "The Stage" were accurately reflective of dramatic and literary fashion, and occasionally included "acute and sensible criticism".

=== 20th century ===
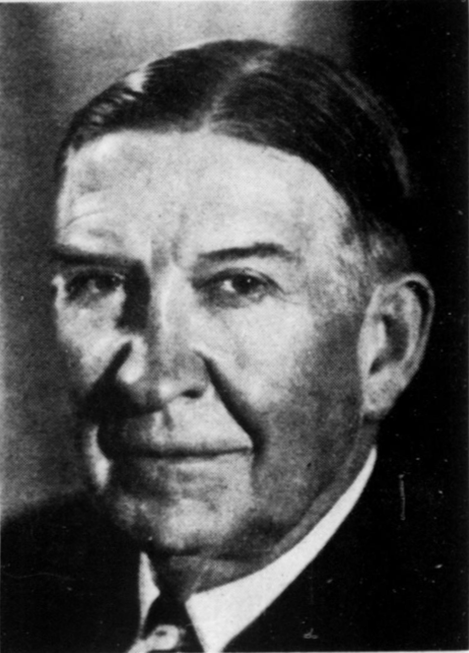
Bob Davis

In the 1900s, when the muckraking movement was at its height, Munsey refused to join the trend, saying later that he was "keenly interested in a constructive policy, not a destructive policy. Munsey's Magazine has never been committed to the muck-raking theory, and never will be." Munsey's political bent was always Republican, but his admiration for Theodore Roosevelt led him to support the Progressive Party in 1912, and Munsey's, along with Munsey's other publications, was strongly for Roosevelt during the Republican convention.

In 1904, Munsey hired Bob Davis to edit the New York Sunday News, and when that was closed down soon afterwards, Davis was made fiction editor of Munsey's Magazine, leaving the editor, Richard Titherington, in overall charge. Davis made an arrangement with O. Henry in January 1905 that for five years he would have the right of first refusal on all Henry's work. In return Davis agreed to pay ten cents a word for everything he bought from Henry. The result was that a dozen stories by Henry appeared in Munsey's over the next five years. Once they had become profitable, all of Munsey's magazines paid on acceptance or soon after, rather than on publication, unlike most of the competing magazines. This made them more attractive to writers.

World War I brought more articles on military topics, often written by members of the government, including Robert Lansing, William C. Redfield, and Franklin Knight Lane. (Note: Lansing was Secretary of State from June 1915 to February 1920; Redfield was Secretary of Commerce from March 1913 to November 1919; and Lane was Secretary of the Interior from 1913 to March 1920.) War pictures and images of members of the government were common, and there were two editorial sections, covering the war but also other topics. Mott describes the nonfiction in the period 1916 to the end of the decade as "unusually interesting and varied", citing work by Richard Le Gallienne, Brander Matthews, and Ann O'Hagan, among others, but adds that the magazine was "on a lethal toboggan", with circulation declining. The "complete novel in each issue" policy, tried in 1892, was revisited in the mid-1910s, with contributions from P. G. Wodehouse, Joseph Conrad, Arnold Bennett, and others: serialization of longer works was tried again, along with variations in the length of the fiction. From 1921 the magazine was switched to fiction only, including poetry. The authors printed came from both the pulp magazines and the upmarket slicks, and included Max Brand and Edgar Rice Burroughs.

Although Munsey's two sister magazines, Argosy and All-Story, regularly carried science fiction, Munsey's rarely did so for its first thirty years. Starting in 1921, with the change to an all-fiction format, some science fiction began to appear, including in the November 1923 issue John D. Swain's "The Last Man on Earth", filmed the following year as The Last Man on Earth. Philip M. Fisher and E. F. Benson also published science fiction in Munsey's. In the February 1923 issue, Tod Robbins' "Spurs" appeared, set in a traveling circus, with a cast including "circus freaks": unusual people such as midgets. The story was filmed in 1932 as Freaks.

== Assessment ==
Munsey's Magazine revolutionized the popular magazine market by proving that a general magazine could be successful at ten cents. McClure's Magazine dropped its price from fifteen cents to ten cents in July 1895, and Cosmopolitan followed suit in November; the three magazines were the leaders of the field, with Munsey's obtaining a head start in circulation because it had taken the first move to the lower price. It was not until 1912 that McClure's finally overtook it. Selling these magazine for ten cents meant that advertising support was required for the magazines to be profitable. Magazines such as Harper's and Atlantic, who were regarded as the leaders of their field, cost twenty-five to thirty-five cents, and their editors saw their market as "the best people, not the most people", in the words of one magazine historian. The revolution Munsey's began led to a huge expansion of the market for general magazines, and the new leaders of the field were published by men primarily interested in making money, rather than in culture. Magazines ran advertisements before Munsey's Magazine, but relying on advertising rather than subscriptions for income became the dominant business model for consumer magazines in the 20th century.

Munsey's biographer, George Britt, described Munsey and McClure as "great rivals of those days ... great business man matched against great editor". McClure considered Munsey "the greatest business man that ever entered the magazine field". McClure published what he liked, believing that what pleased him would please his readers, whereas Munsey published what he thought would be popular, but McClure felt that Munsey was the best editor in the business. Other assessments of Munsey have not been so kind: "a man with no real sense of what values or ideas he wanted his magazine to convey" is one academic comment.

Mott summarizes the magazine's history by saying it was "never a first-class magazine ... sometimes there was quality as well as quantity in the magazine, but there was a shocking amount of mediocrity". John Tebbel, a historian of magazines, agrees: "Munsey's was never as good a magazine as McClure's or Cosmopolitan; its level was nearer the mediocre."

== Bibliographic details ==
Issue data for Munsey's Magazine
	Jan	Feb	Mar	Apr	May	Jun	Jul	Aug	Sep	Oct	Nov	Dec
1891										6/1	6/2	6/3
1892	6/4	6/5	6/6	7/1	7/2	7/3	7/4	7/5	7/6	8/1	8/2	8/3
1893	8/4	8/5	8/6	9/1	9/2	9/3	9/4	9/5	9/6	10/1	10/2	10/3
1894	10/4	10/5	10/6	11/1	11/2	11/3	11/4	11/5	11/6	12/1	12/2	12/3
1895	12/4	12/5	12/6	13/1	13/2	13/3	13/4	13/5	13/6	14/1	14/2	14/3
1896	14/4	14/5	14/6	15/1	15/2	15/3	15/4	15/5	15/6	16/1	16/2	16/3
1897	16/4	16/5	16/6	17/1	17/2	17/3	17/4	17/5	17/6	18/1	18/2	18/3
1898	18/4	18/5	18/6	19/1	19/2	19/3	19/4	19/5	19/6	20/1	20/2	20/3
1899	20/4	20/5	20/6	21/1	21/2	21/3	21/4	21/5	21/6	22/1	22/2	22/3
1900	22/4	22/5	22/6	23/1	23/2	23/3	23/4	23/5	23/6	24/1	24/2	24/3
1901	24/4	24/5	24/6	25/1	25/2	25/3	25/4	25/5	25/6	26/1	26/2	26/3
1902	26/4	26/5	26/6	27/1	27/2	27/3	27/4	27/5	27/6	28/1	28/2	28/3
1903	28/4	28/5	28/6	29/1	29/2	29/3	29/4	29/5	29/6	30/1	30/2	30/3
1904	30/4	30/5	30/6	31/1	31/2	31/3	31/4	31/5	31/6	32/1	32/2	32/3
1905	32/4	32/5	32/6	33/1	33/2	33/3	33/4	33/5	33/6	34/1	34/2	34/3
1906	34/4	34/5	34/6	35/1	35/2	35/3	35/4	35/5	35/6	36/1	36/2	36/3
1907	36/4	36/5	36/6	37/1	37/2	37/3	37/4	37/5	37/6	38/1	38/2	38/3
1908	38/4	38/5	38/6	39/1	39/2	39/3	39/4	39/5	39/6	40/1	40/2	40/3
1909	40/4	40/5	40/6	41/1	41/2	41/3	41/4	41/5	41/6	42/1	42/2	42/3
1910	42/4	42/5	42/6	43/1	43/2	43/3	43/4	43/5	43/6	44/1	44/2	44/3
1911	44/4	44/5	44/6	45/1	45/2	45/3	45/4	45/5	45/6	46/1	46/2	46/3
1912	46/4	46/5	46/6	47/1	47/2	47/3	47/4	47/5	47/6	48/1	48/2	48/3
1913	48/4	48/5	48/6	49/1	49/2	49/3	49/4	49/5	49/6	50/1	50/2	50/3
1914	50/4	51/1	51/2	51/3	51/4	52/1	52/2	52/3	52/4	53/1	53/2	53/3
1915	53/4	54/1	54/2	54/3	54/4	55/1	55/2	55/3	55/4	56/1	56/2	56/3
1916	56/4	57/1	57/2	57/3	57/4	58/1	58/2	58/3	58/4	59/1	59/2	59/3
1917	59/4	60/1	60/2	60/3	60/4	61/1	61/2	61/3	61/4	62/1	62/2	62/3
1918	62/4	63/1	63/2	63/3	63/4	64/1	64/2	64/3	64/4	65/1	65/2	65/3
1919	65/4	66/1	66/2	66/3	66/4	67/1	67/2	67/3	67/4	68/1	68/2	68/3
1920	68/4	69/1	69/2	69/3	69/4	70/1	70/2	70/3	70/4	71/1	71/2	71/3
1921	71/4	72/1	72/2	72/3	72/4	73/1	73/2	73/3	73/4	74/1	74/2	74/3
1922	74/4	75/1	75/2	75/3	75/4	76/1	76/2	76/3	76/4	77/1	77/2	77/3
1923	77/4	78/1	78/2	78/3	78/4	79/1	79/2	79/3	79/4	80/1	80/2	80/3
1924	80/4	81/1	81/2	81/3	81/4	82/1	82/2	82/3	82/4	83/1	83/2	83/3
1925	83/4	84/1	84/2	84/3	84/4	85/1	85/2	85/3	85/4	86/1	86/2	86/3
1926	86/4	87/1	87/2	87/3	87/4	88/1	88/2	88/3	88/4	89/1	89/2	89/3
1927	89/4	90/1	90/2	90/3	90/4	91/1	91/2	91/3	91/4	92/1	92/2	92/3
1928	92/4	93/1	93/2	93/3	93/4	94/1	94/2	94/3	94/4	95/1	95/2	95/3
1929	95/4	96/1	96/2	96/3	96/4	97/1	97/2	97/3	97/4	98/1		
Issues of Munsey's Magazine, showing volume/issue number.

John Kendrick Bangs was the editor from January to June 1889, and from then until the magazine became a monthly the editorial tasks were managed by Munsey's staff, with no named editor. Richard H. Titherington was made editor of the monthly Munsey's Magazine from its first issue in 1891, and stayed in that role until 1929. (Note: Titherington was still listed as editor in September 1928, and his managing editor, W. M. MacMahon, was still listed as managing editor rather than editor in February 1929, only eight months before the final issue. A managing editor is typically responsible for the daily operations of a publication.)

Many issues of Munsey's Weekly may no longer exist; David Reed, in his history of popular magazines, reports that "it would appear that the first five volumes, that contain the weekly issues, are lost". Almost no academic institutions and libraries have any copies of the weekly issues. Surviving copyright records indicate that Munsey's Weekly appeared on a regular schedule until at least the January 21, 1890 issue.

=== Other details ===
A British edition of Munsey's Magazine was begun in 1899, printed in New York and distributed in the UK by Horace Marshall & Son.

== Sources ==
- Anonymous (February 12, 1890). "The Pay of Writers". Printers' Ink. 2 (18): 369.
- Anonymous (February 22, 1890). "Important Notice". Time. Vol. X, no. 289. p. 2.
- Anonymous (March 5, 1890). "Printers' Ink". Printers' Ink. 2 (21): 440–441.
- Anonymous (June 27, 1895). "Cheap Magazines". The Independent. 47 (2430): (867) 11.
- Anonymous (March 1896). "Impressions by the Way". Munsey's Magazine. 14 (6): 760–762.
- Anonymous (September 1928). "The Author & Journalist's Handy Market List for Literary Workers". The Author & Journalist. XIII (9): 15–26.
- Bangs, Francis Hyde (1941). John Kendrick Bangs: Humorist of the Nineties. New York: Alfred A. Knopf. OCLC 188692.
- Britt, George (1972) [1935]. Forty Years—Forty Millions. Port Washington, New York: Kennikat Press. ISBN 0-8046-1513-6.
- Churchill, Allen (1958). Park Row: A Vivid Recreation of Turn of the Century Newspaper Days. Westport, Connecticut: Rinehart & Company, Inc. OCLC 1343034.
- Compaine, Benjamin M. (1982). The Business of Consumer Magazines. Purchase, New York: Knowledge Industry Publications. ISBN 978-0-86729-020-2.
- Cottrill, Tim (2001). Bookery Fantasy's Ultimate Guide to the Pulps and Related Magazines 1896-1959. Fairborn, Ohio: Bookery Press. OCLC 49312554.
- Cox, J. Randolph (2000). The Dime Novel Companion: A Source Book. Westport, Connecticut: Greenwood Press. ISBN 0-313-25674-8.
- D'Orsay, Laurence (February 1929). "The Short Short Story". Writer's Digest. IX (3): 28–31.
- Ellis, Doug; Locke, John; Gunnison, John (2000). The Adventure House Guide to the Pulps. Silver Spring, Maryland: Adventure House. ISBN 1-886937-45-1.
- Hulse, Ed (2013). The Blood 'N' Thunder Guide to Pulp Fiction. Morris Plains, New Jersey: Murania Press. ISBN 978-1-4910-1093-8.
- Lee, James Melvin (1917). History of American Journalism. Boston: Houghton Mifflin Company. OCLC 1310294852.
- Levey, Nathan M. (June 1890). "Comic Papers and Their Editors". The Newsdealer. 1 (4): 79–83.
- Long, E. Hudson (1949). O. Henry: The Man and His Work. Philadelphia, Pennsylvania: University of Pennsylvania Press. OCLC 174734464.
- Moskowitz, Sam (1970). "A History of the Scientific Romance in the Munsey Magazines, 1912–1920". In Moskowitz, Sam (ed.). Under the Moons of Mars: A History and Anthology of the Scientific Romance in the Munsey Magazines, 1912–1920. New York: Holt, Rinehart and Winston. pp. 289–433. ISBN 0-03-081858-3.
- Mott, Frank Luther (1957a) [1938]. A History of American Magazines: 1865–1885. Cambridge, Massachusetts: Harvard University Press. OCLC 52515840.
- Mott, Frank Luther (1957b). A History of American Magazines: 1885–1905. Cambridge, Massachusetts: Harvard University Press. OCLC 228067774.
- Mott, Frank Luther (1968). A History of American Magazines: 1905–1930. Cambridge, Massachusetts: Harvard University Press. OCLC 7046569298.
- Munsey, Frank A. (May 1898). "Getting On In Journalism". Munsey's Magazine. 19 (2): 214–224.
- Munsey, Frank A. (December 1899). "The Making and Marketing of Munsey's Magazine". Munsey's Magazine. XXII (3): 323–343.
- Munsey, Frank A. (1907). The Story of the Founding and Development of the Munsey Publishing-House. New York: The De Vinne Press. OCLC 7003678.
- Pendergast, Tom (2000). Creating the Modern Man: American Magazines and Consumer Culture 1900–1950. Columbia, Missouri: University of Missouri Press. ISBN 0-8262-1280-8.
- Reed, David (1997). The Popular Magazine in Britain and the United States 1880-1960. Toronto: University of Toronto Press. ISBN 0-8020-4214-7.
- Schneirov, Matthew (2000). The Dream of a New Social Order: Popular Magazines in America 1893–1914. New York: Columbia University Press. ISBN 0-231-08290-8.
- Server, Lee (2002). Encyclopedia of Pulp Fiction Writers. New York: Checkmark Books. ISBN 0-8160-4578-X.
- Sumner, David E.; Rhoades, Shirrel (2006). Magazines: A Complete Guide to the Industry. New York: Peter Lang. ISBN 0-8204-7617-X.
- Tebbel, John (1969). The American Magazine: A Compact History. New York: Hawthorn Books. OCLC 45820.
