= Muhammad Mohassib =

Muhammad Mohassib (1843 – April 6, 1928) was an Egyptian antiquities dealer in Luxor, Egypt. He began working as a young donkey boy to Lucie, Lady Duff-Gordon and learned English from her. There may be a photo of him, or his son, in Margaret Benson's book Temple of Mut in Asher. He opened an antiquities shop in Luxor in the early 1880s and became well known among especially British and French archaeologists and dealers. Many important collections in museums in Europe and the US were partly bought from Mohassib. For example, the Museum of Fine Arts, Boston (US) purchased a "Head of a King" from Mohassib in 1904.

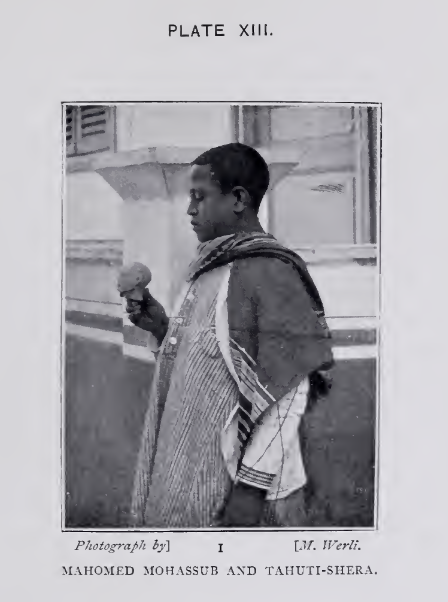
Plate 13 from The Temple of Mut in Asher showing a young Muhammad Mohassib holding a pottery head. This may be the antiquities dealer, or his son.

Americans Theodore M. Davis and Emma Andrews bought a number of pieces from Mohassib during the time they were travelling through Egypt (1889-1913). For example, in March 1898, Davis bought mummified remains from Mohassib, that had come from Nagada with the intention of donating them to the Metropolitan Museum of Art. E. A. Wallis Budge of the British Museum corresponded with Mohassib, who would regularly arrange to purchase items from him. As with any antiquities dealers in this period, Mohassib frequently sold items stolen from "inadequately supervised excavations" around Luxor, and Davis and Andrews were reasonably certain they regularly bought back items from their own sites. Because of this, it is difficult to ascertain the provenance of many items coming from his shop.

Upon his death on April 6, 1928, in Luxor, Percy Newberry memorialized him in the Journal of Egyptian Archaeology. Newberry wrote of him: "He was a man of fine character, generous, beloved by all who knew him, especially the poor of his native village."

== See also ==
Mohareb Todros, German consul and antiquities dealer in Luxor (1847–1937)
