= The Princess (Tennyson poem) =

1847 narrative poem by Alfred Tennyson

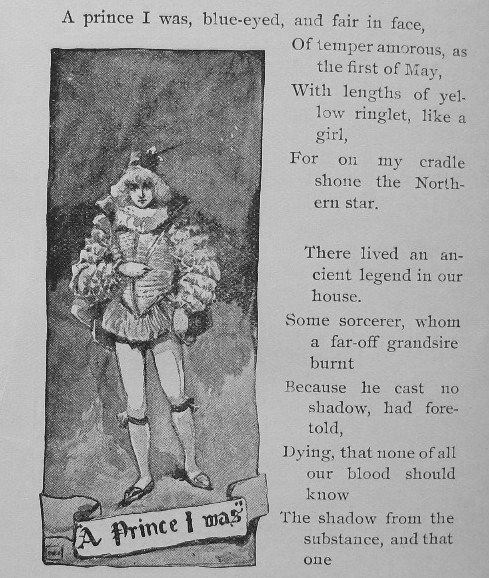
'A prince I was' – one of Charles Howard Johnson's illustrations for the 1890 edition

The Princess is a serio-comic blank verse narrative poem, written by Alfred Tennyson, published in 1847. Tennyson was Poet Laureate of the United Kingdom from 1850 to 1892 and remains one of the most popular English poets. (Note: See, for example, Tucker (2009), forward)

The poem tells the story of a heroic princess who forswears the world of men and founds a women's university where men are forbidden to enter. The prince to whom she was betrothed in infancy enters the university with two friends, disguised as women students. They are discovered and flee, but eventually they fight a battle for the princess's hand. They lose and are wounded, but the women nurse the men back to health. Eventually the princess returns the prince's love.

Several later works have been based upon the poem, including Gilbert and Sullivan's 1884 comic opera Princess Ida.

== Background ==
Tennyson planned the poem in the late 1830s after discussing the idea with Emily Sellwood, whom he later married in 1850. It seems to have been a response to criticism that he was not writing about serious issues. It was also a response, in part, to the founding of Queen's College, London, Britain's first college for women, in 1847. (Note: The college was not quite a higher education institution in the modern sense: it admitted girls and women from the age of twelve upwards, and is now an independent secondary school for girls: see Cockburn, King & McDonnell 1968, p. 311-312) Two of Tennyson's friends were part-time professors there. Other critics speculate that the poem was partly inspired by the opening of Love's Labour's Lost and other literary works. Janet Ross, the daughter of Lucie, Lady Duff-Gordon recalled that "[Tennyson] told my mother that he had her in mind when he wrote The Princess. I don't think she was as much flattered as many of his admirers would have been".

Tennyson is reported as saying, in the 1840s, that "the two great social questions impending in England were 'the education of the poor man before making him our master, and the higher education of women'." The women's rights movement, including the right to higher education, was still at an early stage in 1847. In Britain, the first university-level women's school, Girton College, Cambridge, was not opened until 1869, more than two decades after Tennyson wrote The Princess. (Note: Even then, it was not recognised as a full constituent of the university until 1948. See Girton's official website) In A Vindication of the Rights of Woman (1792), however, Mary Wollstonecraft had been an early advocate of the equality of men and women, and writers such as John Stuart Mill had argued for female emancipation. Nevertheless, "Tennyson was in the vanguard in writing of the subject (Note: Tennyson must have been aware of a number of earlier writings about women's higher education as he wrote the poem. See Zimmerman, p. 77.) and although critics have rightly complained about the conservative ending of his poem, he must be credited with broaching the topic and voicing some of the injustices women suffered." In The Princess, "Tennyson describes with such clarity the principal problems of feminism".

As in the case of many other Tennyson poems, The Princess is framed by a prologue and a conclusion outside of the main narrative. The description of a summer fête that opens the poem is based on a feast of the Mechanics' Institute at a country house, Park House, near Maidstone, in 1842. The narrative device is a tale of fancy composed in turn by some university undergraduates, based on an old chronicle. Though the poem was moderately successful, Tennyson wrote to a friend, saying "I hate it and so will you". He revised the work after its first publication. Some of the best-known lyrics, including "The splendour falls on castle walls" were added for the third edition (1850).

== Synopsis ==
As with many of Tennyson's works, The Princess has an outer setting to the main narrative, consisting of a Prologue and a Conclusion that take place at a Victorian-era summer fête. The characters in the Prologue agree to participate in a storytelling game about a heroic princess in days of old, based on an ancient family chronicle. The main narrative follows, given in seven lengthy "Cantos", with the prince as narrator.

=== The prince seeks Princess Ida ===
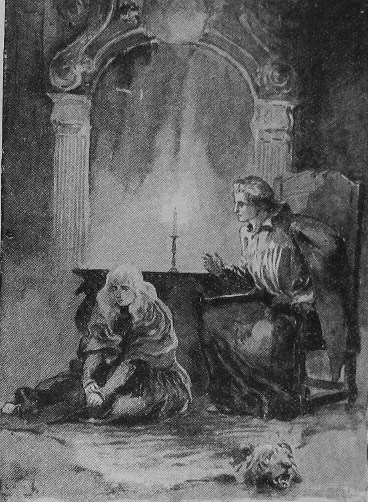
"O marvellously modest maiden, you" – 1890 illustration

In the main narrative, a prince has been betrothed since infancy to a princess, Ida, from a neighbouring land. The princess has grown to become beautiful and accomplished and has founded a university of maidens in a remote retreat. Her father, King Gama, explains that she refuses to have anything to do with the world of men and is influenced by other women, Lady Blanche and Lady Psyche, who have resolved never to wed a man. The prince and two friends, Cyril and Florian, decide to infiltrate the university to try to win the princess's return. They disguise themselves as women and ride into the university asking to enrol as students. Florian is Lady Psyche's brother and hopes to influence her.

The "new students" are taken to see the princess, who tells them that they must "cast and fling the tricks, which make us toys of men", so that they may become equal with men. The men are impressed by the princess and debate the merits of women's equality. They move around the university, listening and learning. Their tutors, Lady Psyche and Lady Blanche, discover the men's subterfuge, but hide their knowledge for reasons of their own. Blanche and Psyche are intellectual and political rivals at the university, and Blanche vows to force Psyche out.

=== The prince is discovered ===
Ida and the prince walk together, and, still posing as a woman student, he tells her news of the prince and his court, and they discuss the marriage contract between Ida and the prince. He tells her how the prince loves her from afar. She speaks of her ideals of equality. The prince touches hands with Ida on the path. At a picnic, Ida invites the prince to sing a song from her [his] homeland. He sings of love, but Ida mocks it and talks of the inequality of love between men and women. She invites another song about the women of her [his] land. Cyril sings a drunken tavern song, and chaos breaks out as the men's identities become obvious to all. In the confusion, Ida falls into the river, and the prince saves her from drowning.

The men flee (and Psyche flees with Cyril, leaving her child behind in the castle), but the prince and Florian are recaptured. Letters arrive from the prince's father (the king) and Ida's father (Gama). Gama tells how he started to come to Ida to plead for the prince but was taken hostage by the king. The king tells Ida not to harm the prince and to free him, or the king's army will storm the castle. The prince declares his love for Ida, saying, "except you slay me here according to your bitter statute-book, I cannot cease to follow you... but half without you; with you, whole; and of those halves you worthiest". Word comes that the king has arrived to storm the castle. Ida gives a stirring speech, saying that she will lead the maidens into battle. Though Ida appears to be forming an interest in the prince, she renounces her marriage contract. The prince and Florian are freed and pushed out of the castle. Psyche is distraught at having betrayed Ida and her cause, and having lost her child.

=== Battle and aftermath ===
The king wants to make war, but the prince wants to win Ida's love. He says, "wild natures need wise curbs... not war: lest I lose all". Gama and the prince have developed a warm relationship, and Gama supports the prince's cause, but Ida's brothers support their sister at all costs. The prince and his friends offer to fight Ida's brothers and to let the battle decide whether Ida must keep her contract. Ida's brother Arac sends word of this proposal to Ida, who rants against the harm done to women, but confident of her brothers' victory, she agrees to abide by the contest. Meanwhile, Ida has been growing to love Psyche's child.

In the battle, Ida's brothers defeat and wound the prince and his friends. The prince acknowledges defeat and pleads with Ida to let Psyche reclaim her child, but he falls into a coma. Ida rants against Psyche's betrayal. The king says that he cannot let such a hard woman tend his son. Ida relents and asks the king to let her tend the prince's injuries, and to let the ladies tend to Cyril and Florian. This shows her willingness to bend her own laws. By ministering to the men, the ladies of the university become more fair, and Ida finds peace. Love blossoms between the nurses and the nursed.

Ida eventually comes to love the prince. As he regains consciousness at times, they discuss their ideas of love, and she discovers that they agree on the equality of love; not, as she had always feared, women's servitude in love – he has been well-schooled in this by his mother. The prince envisages a future where "The man may be more of woman, she of man". He says "my hopes and thine are one" and asks her to place her trust in him.

=== Conclusion ===
In the Conclusion, the narrator reflects on how to tell the long story, noting that the events are "Too comic for the solemn things they are, / Too solemn for the comic touches in them."

== Critical opinion ==
The Princess has divided opinion about where Tennyson's sympathies lay. The poet's son Hallam wrote that his father held that "the sooner woman finds out, before the great educational movement begins, that 'woman is not undevelopt man, but diverse', the better it will be for the progress of the world." The cool reception of the piece "seems to have led Tennyson to revise the poem after publication more extensively than any of his others". The early view that Tennyson was sympathetic to a progressive view of women's education but found it expedient to subordinate it to the dictates of Victorian society led the poet to rebalance The Princess by adding the interlude songs in his 1850 revision: "I thought that the poem would explain itself, but the public did not see the drift."

The songs, which relate to the contemporary world of Tennyson's time, are in contrast to the main narrative, which is male-oriented, with a mock-mediaeval setting. Thus, it can be argued, Tennyson balanced the anti-feminist message of the men's narrative with the practical progressiveness displayed in the women's songs. Other critics conclude that the final message of the narrative is plain and anti-feminist.

== Works based on The Princess ==
W. S. Gilbert, perhaps attracted by Tennyson's serio-comic treatment of the subject of women's education, adapted and parodied the poem twice. First, in 1870, he produced a musical farce called The Princess. Later, in 1884, he adapted his farce into a comic opera with composer Arthur Sullivan entitled Princess Ida, which is still performed occasionally today.

Other musical works inspired by the poem include a setting of "As Through the Land" composed by the poet Edward Lear in his lesser-known capacity as a composer. Both Ralph Vaughan Williams and Frank Bridge composed settings for the "Tears, Idle Tears" section of The Princess. (Note: Both settings are for voice and piano, and they were composed, respectively, in 1902 and 1905.) Gustav Holst set "Home They Brought Her Warrior Dead." In addition, Holst wrote a set of five songs for female voices based on Tennyson's work including "Sweet and Low", "The Splendour Falls", "Tears, Idle Tears", "O Swallow, Swallow" and "Now Sleeps the Crimson Petal" while he was teaching at a girls' school in South London. Among later musical works inspired by The Princess are Benjamin Britten's Serenade for Tenor, Horn and Strings, which includes a setting of "The splendour falls", and a setting of "Ask me no more" by Ned Rorem.

John Melhuish Strudwick's painting Oh Swallow, Swallow is based on this poem.

Single LOST by ASC feat. Tom Hiddleston released 17 April 2019, East Records.
