= Janet Ross =

English historian and biographer

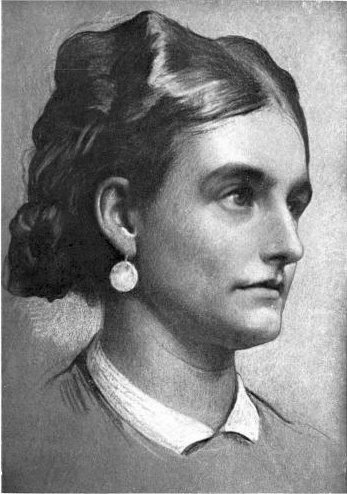
- Born: Janet Ann Duff Gordon; 1842; London
- Died: 1927 (aged 84–85); Florence, Italy
- Resting place: City Cemetery, Florence, Italy
- Spouse: Henry Ross
- Children: Alick Ross
- Writing career
- Notable works: Leaves from Our Tuscan Kitchen, or, How to Cook Vegetables; The Fourth Generation (1912)

Janet Ann Ross (née Duff Gordon; 1842–1927) was an English historian, biographer, and Tuscan cookbook author.

== Early life ==
Janet Duff Gordon was the daughter of Sir Alexander Duff-Gordon and Lucie, Lady Duff-Gordon. Her father held a number of government positions, including Commissioner of Inland Revenue and her mother wrote the classic Letters from Egypt. She had a brother, Maurice and a sister, Urania.

She was the granddaughter of Sarah Austin, a famous translator, and the influential legal philosopher John Austin.

She grew up in a highly cultured atmosphere among England's leading intellectual and literary figures. Her parents' friends and regular visitors to her home included: William Thackeray, Charles Dickens, Thomas Macaulay, Alfred Lord Tennyson, Caroline Norton, Tom Taylor, and Thomas Carlyle.

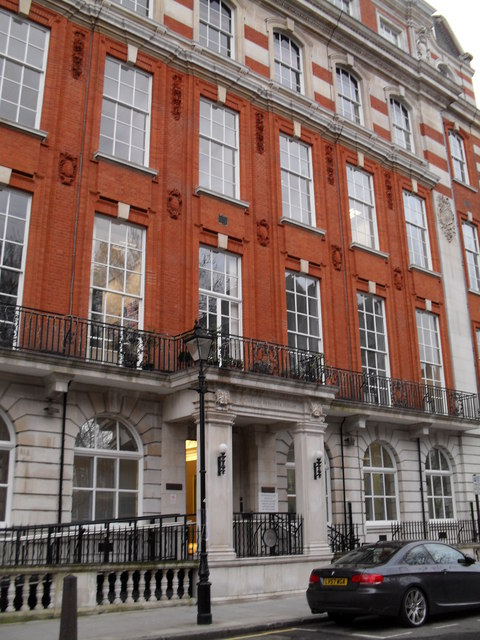
Janet Ross's Childhood Home at No. 8 Queen Anne's Square

Janet's first years were spent at her family home at 8 Queen Square, Westminster, a house with a statue of Queen Anne at one end, since renumbered as 15 Queen Anne's Gate. Her parents subsequently moved to Esher. Her memoirs do not reference formal education, aside from mentioning some tutors. She did travel to Paris and Germany for extended periods of time to learn French and German. She makes it clear that she preferred the company of adults and their conversation from a very young age.

Her family's connections certainly augmented her education. For example, Dickens encouraged her reading early on and gave her one of her first books. She remembers her fifth birthday party, sitting on the knee of Thackeray while he drew a sketch on the frontispiece of her copy of his novel Pendennis. Charles Babbage, the inventor of the difference engine, a precursor to the modern computer, invited her to his office to show her his newest calculator. The French philosopher Jules Barthelemy-Saint-Hilaire tutored her in French and became a lifetime correspondent. She likewise befriended Sir Austen Henry Layard and began an adolescent correspondence with him that continued through her life. She recalls Tennyson telling her that her mother had inspired him to write The Princess. Alexander Kinglake, author of Eothen, would take her riding, and likewise became a correspondent. At the age of thirteen, her knowledge of German was such that Kinglake asked her to translate a German book for him.

== Life in Egypt ==
In 1860, she married a banker, Henry Ross, who was aged 40 to her 18. In 1861, they moved to Alexandria, Egypt, where Henry was a partner in a British bank, Briggs and Co., located in Cairo. While in Egypt, she continued cultivating relationships with learned and influential people. Early on she befriended Said Halim Pasha who gave her a wedding present of a Bay horse. Halim was the son of Muhammed Ali of Egypt, who is regarded as the father of modern Egypt. He had inherited his father's palace at Choubra. Halim later became Grand Vizier of the Ottoman Empire.In 1861 Janet was visited by Sir James Outram. She also befriended Ferdinand de Lesseps who took her on an early tour of the construction of the Suez Canal. Sir Henry Bulwer, former British ambassador to Istanbul, visited her in 1863.

Janet's "many social connections and essential nosiness positioned her as an ideal observer of foreign affairs" and she was briefly the Egyptian correspondent for The Evening Mail before becoming the Egyptian correspondent for The Times. There is, however, speculation that it was not her but her husband Henry who was The Times correspondent. Janet travelled extensively in Egypt. She sailed up the Nile to Luxor, toured the temple Medinet Habu, and the Theban temples at Denderah. She made an excursion to the tombs of the Mamluk Sultans. In 1863, she travelled by camel to Tall al Kabir to see the fete of Abou Nichab. While on the trip she dressed in bedouin garb, lived in a tent, and went hawking.

== Life in Italy ==
In 1867, the Egyptian banking system underwent a crisis that diminished Henry Ross's investments and ended his banking career. Given their reduced circumstances Henry and Janet decided against returning to England because of the high cost of living. Instead they explored living on the continent, looking initially at an estate in France. Henry and Janet eventually moved to Florence, Italy, leaving their only child, Alexander (Alick) to be educated in England.

They initially lived in a couple of apartments in Florence, on the Lungarno Acciaiuoli and the Lungarno Torrigiani. They tried to buy Fenis Castle near Aosta, Italy, but could not afford it. They ultimately rented Villa Castagnolo seven miles west of Florence in Lastra a Signa from its owner: Marchese Lotteringo della Stufa. The capital city of Italy was relocating from Florence to Rome, and the Marchese moved with it to take a government position. The Marchese was extremely knowledgeable about agriculture and taught Janet much about farming. In turn, Janet also began implementing more modern agricultural methods at the villa especially in the areas of viticulture and cheese-making. One year she supervised the making of olive oil, an experience she would find useful when she later purchased her own villa. Henry, essentially retired at this point, occupied himself by raising orchids. Janet also befriended a local sculptor, Carlo Orsi, who resided at Orsi Villa. Henry encouraged Orsi to do more sketching, and Janet ultimately used him to illustrate many of her books. While at Castagnolo, Janet had a falling out with the British novelist Marie Louise Rame, who wrote under the pseudonym Ouida. Ouida was wooing the Marchese and believed Janet's relationship with him was more than platonic. In her novel Friendship she included an unflattering portrait of a character transparently based on Janet. Janet responded by placing a copy of the novel, sans covers, in the bathroom for appropriate use.

In 1884, the Rosses travelled to Apulia in Southern Italy, where they stayed with Sir James Lacaita at his estate (Villa Leucàspide) near Taranto. Lacaita was an Italian scholar and politician. While there, Janet travelled extensively throughout the region. The trip inspired her book Land of Manfred prince of Tarentum... (1889), which she dedicated to Lacaita.

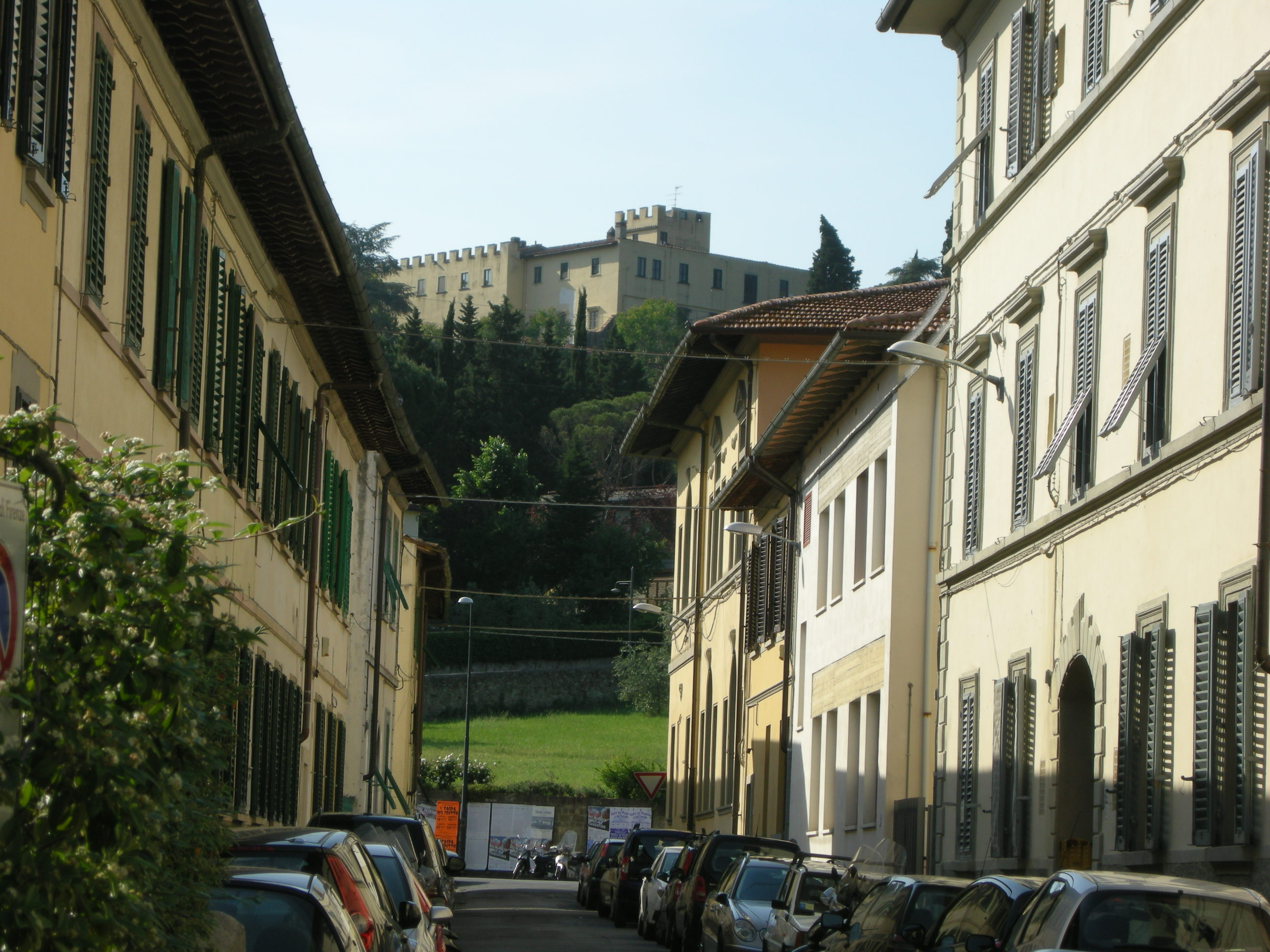
View of Poggio Gherardo from Florence

In 1888, the Rosses acquired the Villa di Poggio Gherardo (Italian) outside Florence, near Settignano. The villa had been in the Gherardo family for some 450 years, and purportedly was the one famously referenced by Boccaccio in the Decameron. It came with three attached farms (poderes) and operated under the mezzadria system whereby the tenant farmers (contadini) paid rent to the padrona consisting of half their production. Janet Ross was a capable businesswoman who managed the estate well and sold its produce at an adequate profit. She imported fortified white wine from Sicily, added sugar and a number of herbs, producing a vermouth that was in considerable demand in England. She claimed the vermouth recipe was a secret one handed down to her by the last of the Medicis.

She was also an occasional dealer in art. She discovered the painting The School of Pan by Luca Signorelli and later sold it at a substantial profit. She purchased a drawing by early Renaissance painter Andrea del Sarto that was a study for his painting Deposition From the Cross. She also acquired a painting that Bernard Berenson identified as being Madonna and Child by the Renaissance painter Alesso Baldovinetti.

Janet conducted a salon of sorts on Sundays at the villa, entertaining numerous writers and artists including: Edward Hutton, George Meredith, John Addington Symonds, Augustus Hare, Marie Corelli, Alfred Austin, and Norman Douglas. In 1892 she located the nearby Villa Viviano for Mark Twain and his wife to rent for a year, during which time they became good friends. While there, Twain completed the manuscript of his novel Pudd'nhead Wilson. In her autobiography, Janet remarks:

The Clemens family were very pleasant neighbours. He used to drop in at all hours declaring that Poggio Gherardo was the nearest way to anywhere. I confess I preferred Mr. Clemens, keen-sighted, sensible, and largehearted, to the amusing laughter provoking Mark Twain.

Twain also arranged shipment of watermelon seeds and maize seeds to Janet, claiming that there was no corn to be found in all of Italy. A young Iris Origo was a nearby neighbour at Villa Medici and spent much of her time with Janet. The British writer Violet May, who wrote under the pseudonym Vernon Lee, lived at the neighbouring Villa Palmerino, and shared many acquaintances with Janet.

In 1890, Janet's sister-in-law Frances Gordon died. At her death, Frances' sixteen-year-old daughter Caroline (Lina) was attending school in a convent in Paris. Frances had been separated from her husband Maurice for some time. Maurice was getting remarried and was not interested in raising his daughter. Lina likewise did not want to live with him and his new wife. Janet therefore adopted her, as Frances had wished. Lina left the convent and moved in with the Rosses. In her autobiography, Lina describes Janet as stern in outward comportment, but with a loving heart. Perhaps because she had long been estranged from her son, she welcomed Lina as her own child. Lina ultimately married the painter Aubrey Waterfield, and they moved to Aulla, Italy, where they purchased a castle – the Fortezza Brunella.

Janet also helped art historian and writer Bernard Berenson find and purchase a neighbouring villa, I Tatti. She wrote for literary journals, including Fraser's Magazine, Macmillan's Magazine, Longman's Magazine, Cosmopolis: A Literary Review, Temple Bar, and Frank Leslie's Popular Monthly. Her publishers encouraged her to select and publish some of her previous writings as Italian Sketches, which became a big success. She followed that book with Early Days Recalled (1891), and her memoir Three Generations of English Women (1888), which dealt with her grandmother and mother, as well as her great-grandmother, Susannah Cook Taylor.

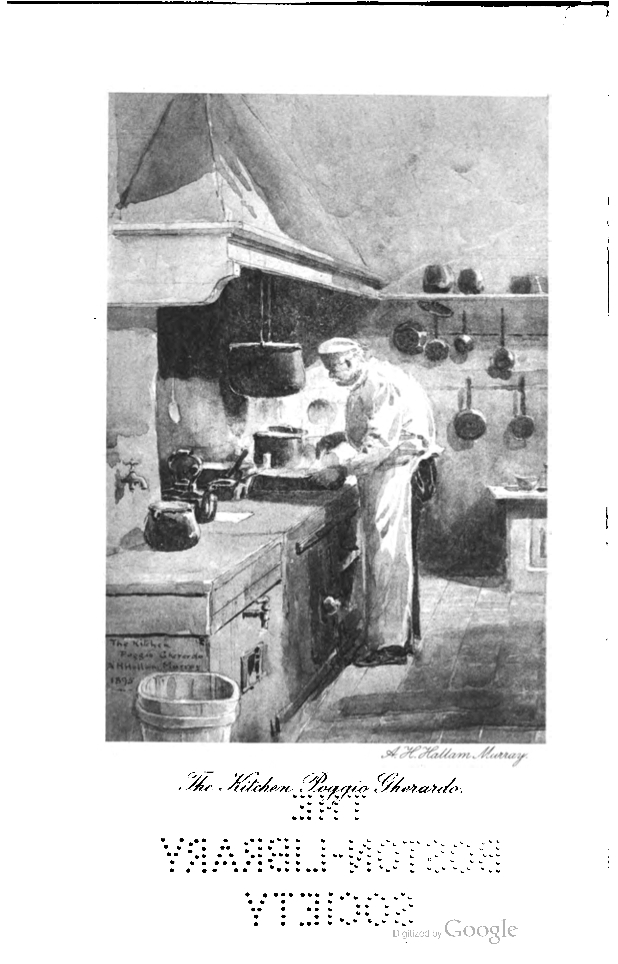
Frontispiece of Leaves From Our Tuscan Kitchen, showing Chef Volpi in the kitchen of Poggio Gherardo

Janet Ross wrote the classic cookbook Leaves from Our Tuscan Kitchen, or, How to Cook Vegetables, which is a collection of recipes supplied by the Rosses' chef, Guiseppi Volpi, at Poggio Gherardo. The book is still in print, with the latest edition revised by her grand-grand nephew Michael Waterfield. She also wrote Florentine Villas (1901) and other books related to Italy, Florence and Tuscany, including: Terra De Manfredi (1899); Florentine Palaces And Their Stories (1905); Lives Of The Early Medici As Told In Their Correspondence (1910); The Story Of Pisa; and The Story Of Lucca (1912).

On 19 May 1895, a severe earthquake struck Florence. Poggio Gherardo was severely damaged. The tower collapsed, and stones from it fell through the ceilings in the cook's room and in Lina's room. The cost of repair was quite expensive, and the Rosses were required, inter alia, to sell their painting School of Pan to help pay for repairs.

In 1902 Henry Ross died. During World War I, Lina Waterfield's castle was requisitioned for military purposes. Lina, her husband and daughter moved in with the Rosses during this period. In her autobiography, Lina's daughter Kinta also portrays Janet as somewhat intimidating in appearance, but very kind and loving. As had her mother, Kinta found Poggio Gherardo a magical place to be as a child.

In 1912 Janet Ross published her autobiographical memoir The Fourth Generation. The book was a sequel to her Three Generations. It largely incorporated the text from Early Days Recalled and brought it current. It incorporated many letters from, inter alia, Kinglake, Layard, Meredith, and Hillaire. Janet died from cancer in 1927. She was cremated and buried in the Florence City Cemetery.

== Heirs ==
Janet Ross originally had intended to leave her villa to her son. Alick, however, had led a dissolute life, and was experiencing serious financial difficulties. To keep the villa out of his creditors' hands, she changed her will to leave the villa as a life estate to her niece Lina (Caroline) Waterfield, and then to Lina's son on Lina's death. Lina sold her castle in Aulla and moved to Poggio Gherardo on Janet's death. Lina and her husband Aubrey thereafter operated an English girls' boarding school in the villa to help defray expenses.

Lina left the villa for England in 1940. During World War II, the villa was requisitioned by a prominent fascist leader and later occupied by American troops. When Lina returned after the war, she found most of her personal goods gone, and some damage to the villa. She briefly tried to restore the villa; however, after her son's death, she sold it to a developer in 1952. The developer split off the three podere and sold the villa to a religious order, Istituto Antoniano which has since operated an orphanage there.

== Selected works ==
=== Books ===
- Italian Sketches (K. Paul Trench & Co. 1887)
- Three Generations of English Women (J. Murray 1888)
- Leaves from Our Tuscan Kitchen, or, How to Cook Vegetables (J. M. Dent 1900), rev'd ed. ISBN 978-1-904943-62-4
- The Land of Manfred prince of Tarentum… (London, J. Murray 1889); Italian translation: La Terra di Manfredi (Cavallino di Lecce 1978, ed. by Vittorio Zacchino)
- Florentine Palaces And Their Stories (J. M. Dent 1905)
- Lives of the Early Medici As Told in Their Correspondence (Chatto & Windus 1910)
- The Story of Pisa (J. M. Dent 1909)
- The Story of Lucca (J. M. Dent 1912)
- The Fourth Generation (Charles Scribner's Sons 1912)
- Old Florence and Modern Tuscany (J. M. Dent 1904)
- Fyvie Castle and its Lairds (Aberdeen 1884)
- Early Days Recalled (Chapman And Hall 1891)
- Florentine Villas (J. M. Dent 1901)

=== Translations ===
- Cosimo De Medici, Poesie Volgari (J. M. Dent 1912)
- Generale Enrico della Rocca, The Autobiography of a Veteran, 1807–1893 (The Macmillan Co. 1898)
