= Mohareb Todros =

Mohareb Todros (Arabic: محارب تودروس; ca. 1847 – 22 November 1937) was Consul of the German Empire for Upper Egypt, residing in Luxor, and a prominent antiquities dealer.

== Life and work ==
Mohareb Todros followed in the footsteps of his father Boulos Todros (date of birth unknown, † 1898), who was consular agent of Prussia in Luxor and antiquities dealer. In contrast to his father, who had no German, he was fluent in German and English. The Todros family were Copts.

German visitors to Egypt in 1888 and 1894 recounted that Todros – as German consul in Luxor – very kindly welcomed them in his residence. The host showed his collection of antiquities (which were also for sale) exhibited in two rooms, as well as his prized guestbook (German: "das Fremdenbuch"), started by his father. It contained photos and memories of distinguished guests, among whom prominent Egyptologists.

Boulos Todros and Mohareb Todros acquired and sold Coptic manuscripts from the library of the White Monastery near Sohag, shortly after Gaston Maspero’s visits to the Monastery in 1885–1886. Boulos Todros was in close contact with Maspero, supplying him many antiquities for the Egyptian Museum in Boulaq. In 1873 he sold an important medical papyrus to Georg Ebers, that became known as the Ebers Papyrus.

Two nested coffins containing the mummy of a man from Akhmim (Late Period), now in the Washington State History Museum, were purchased in 1891 by Allen C. Mason from Mohareb Todros.

Towards of after the end of Todros' life, his antiquities business was taken over by his son Zaki Mohareb Todros.

== See also ==
Muhammad Mohassib, antiquities dealer in Luxor (1843–1928)

== Sources ==
- Bierbrier, M.L. (2019). "TODROUS BOULOS (d. 1898)". Who Was Who in Egyptology (5th rev. ed.). London: Egypt Exploration Society. p. 460. ISBN 978-0-85698-248-4.
- Buzi, Paola (2014). Bausi, Alessandro (ed.). Coptic Manuscripts, Part 7: The Manuscripts of the Staatsbibliothek zu Berlin Preussischer Kulturbesitz. Part 4: Homilectic and Liturgical Manuscripts from the White Monastery. With two documents from Thebes and two Old-Nubian manuscripts (pdf). Verzeichnis der orientalischen Handschriften in Deutschland. Vol. XXI, 7. Stuttgart: Franz Steiner Verlag. ISBN 978-3-515-10711-2.
- Hagen, Fredrik; Ryholt, Kim (2016). The Antiquities Trade in Egypt 1880–1930. The H.O. Lange Papers. Copenhagen: Kongelige Danske Videnskabernes Selskab.
- kjohnsto (28 May 2020). "Ankh-Wenennefer (Inner Coffin)-WSHS". The Book of the Dead in 3D. UC Berkeley.
- Sabersky, H. (1886). Ein Winter in Ägypten. Eine Reisebeschreibung (in German). Berlin: Schall & Grund.
- Stinde, Julius (1888). Frau Buchholz im Orient (in German). Berlin: Verlag Freund & Jeckel.
- Wilson, John A. (1964). Signs & Wonders Upon Pharaoh. A History of American Egyptology (pdf). Chicago and London: The University of Chicago Press. LCCN 64-23535.
