= James Lacaita =

Anglo-Italian politician and writer (1813–1895)

Sir James Lacaita (1813–1895) K.C.M.G was an Anglo-Italian politician and writer.

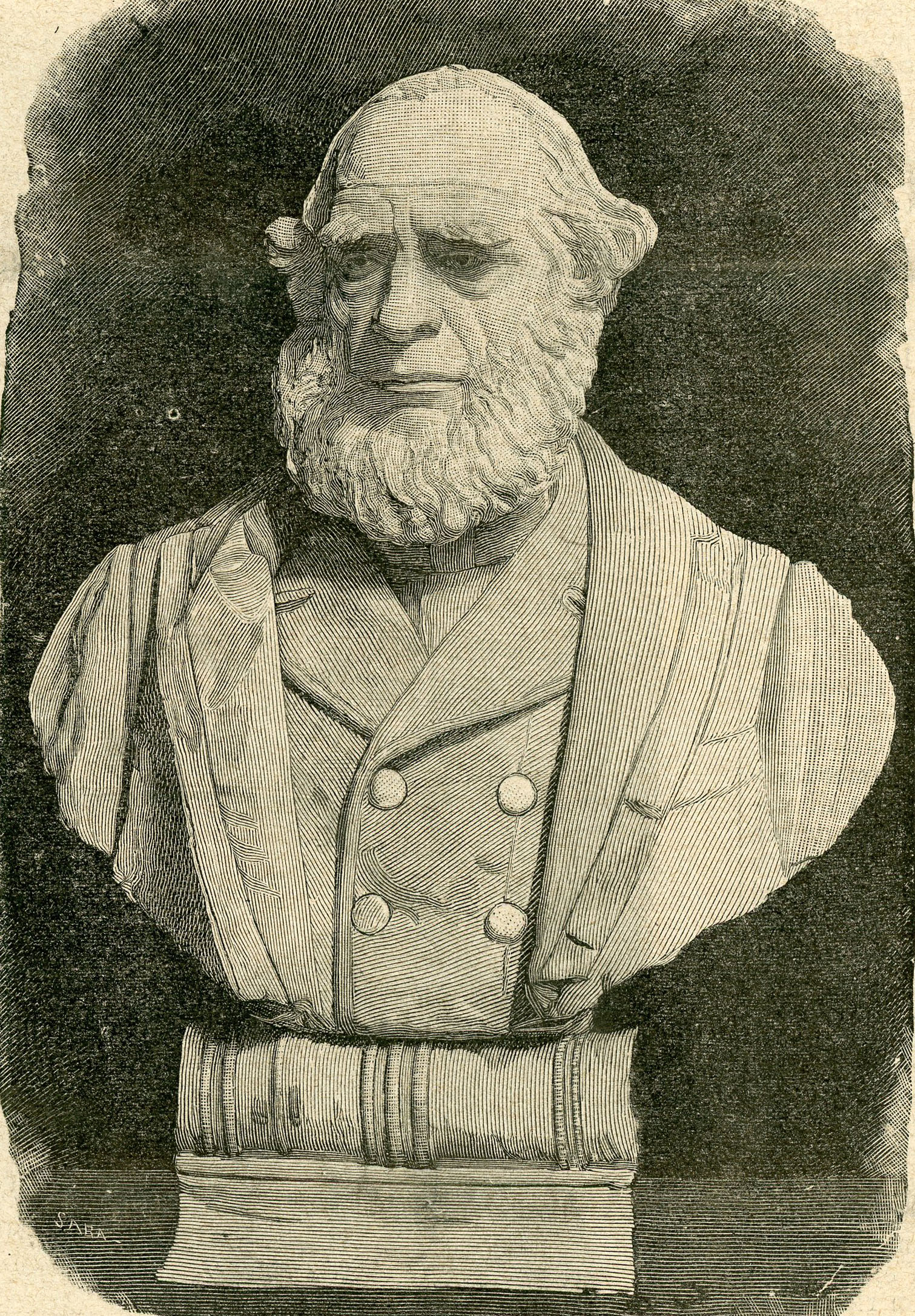
James Lacaita

== Life ==
He was the only son of Diego Lacaita of Manduria in the Terra d'Otranto, and of Agata Conti of Agnone in the Molise. He was born at Manduria, in the province of Lecce, Kingdom of Naples, on 4 October 1813. He took a law degree at the University of Naples, was admitted an advocate in 1836, and practised his profession. An acquaintance with Enos Throop, United States chargé d'affaires at Naples, begun in December 1838, helped him in the study of English, and this knowledge gained him the post of legal adviser to the British legation at Naples, and the friendship of the minister, Sir William Temple, at whose table he met many English travellers of distinction.

Lacaita's political opinions were liberal but moderate, and he never belonged to any secret society. He was an unsuccessful candidate for the representation of the city of Naples in 1848, and on 7 April was appointed secretary to the Neapolitan legation in London, but did not start for his post, which he resigned after the fall of the liberal Troya ministry in May. In November 1850, he met Gladstone, who was in Naples in order to collect information about Bourbon misrule. This led to the arrest of Lacaita on 3 January 1851, and he remained in custody for nine days. In a letter from Gladstone to Panizzi, in September, he is referred to as 'a most excellent man, hunted by the government'. The publication of Gladstone's letters to Lord Aberdeen, for which Lacaita supplied many striking facts, aroused the hostility of the court and clerical partisans in Italy, and Lacaita found it advisable to leave Naples for London, where he arrived on 8 January 1852.

He was at Edinburgh on 14 February, in May he was an unsuccessful candidate for the office of librarian of the London Library, and on 15 June he married Maria Clavering (died 1853), daughter of Sir Thomas Gibson Carmichael, seventh baronet. His means were small, but he made many powerful friends in the best political and literary circles in London and Edinburgh. From November 1853 until April 1856 he was professor of Italian at Queen's College, London, was naturalised in July 1855, and published 'Selections from the best Italian Writers'. In the winter of 1856-7 he accompanied Lord Minto to Florence and Turin. From 1857 to 1863, he acted as private secretary to Lord Lansdowne, and towards the close of 1858 went with Gladstone to the Ionian Islands as secretary to the mission, being made K.C.M.G. for his services in March 1859.

Lacaita was entrusted by Cavour with a delicate diplomatic negotiation in 1860 connected with schemes to prevent Garibaldi from crossing from Sicily to Calabria, and subsequently the Neapolitan government offered him the post of minister in London with the title of marquis, both of which he declined. In December 1860, after the expulsion of the Bourbons, he revisited Naples, caused his name to be reinstated on the municipal registry, and in July 1861, while back in England, was returned as deputy to the first Italian legislature. He generally supported the new Italian government. After the dissolution of 1865 he did not seek re-election, and was made a senator in 1876.

Though speaking but seldom in the chamber, he exercised a considerable influence upon public affairs between 1861 and 1876 through his intimacy with Ricasoli, La Marmora, Minghetti, Visconti-Venosta, and other leading men. Florence became his headquarters in Italy after the removal of the government thence from Turin, and so it remained even after the transfer of the capital to Rome. He spent a portion of each year in England, and during the last fifteen years of his life wintered at Leucaspide, near Taranto, where he had made large purchases of monastic lands in 1868. In 1884, the English writer Janet Ross and her husband travelled to Apulia where they stayed with Sir James Lacaita at his estate (Villa Leucàspide). While there, Janet travelled extensively throughout the region. The trip inspired her book Land of Manfred prince of Tarentum... (London 1899), which she dedicated to Lacaita. He was a director of the Italian company for the Southern Railways from its formation, and took a share in the management of several Anglo-Italian public companies. Besides his English title, he was a knight of the Brazilian order of the Rose, and knight commander of S. Maurizio e Lazzaro and of the Corona d'Italia.

He died at Posilipo, near Naples, on 4 January 1895.

== Works ==
An authority on Dante, he gave lectures on Italian literature and history while in England; he wrote articles on Italian subjects, and edited Benvenuto da Imola's Latin lectures on Dante delivered in 1375. He cooperated with George Warren, 5th Baron Vernon in his edition of Dante's Inferno (London, 1858–1865), and compiled a catalogue in four volumes of the Duke of Devonshire's library at Chatsworth (London, 1879).

== Family ==
Lacaita married Maria Clavering Gibson-Carmichael, daughter of Sir Thomas Gibson-Carmichael. Their son Charles Carmichael Lacaita was a Member of Parliament and botanist.
