= Lucie, Lady Duff-Gordon =

English author and translator (1821-1869)

Lady Duff-Gordon
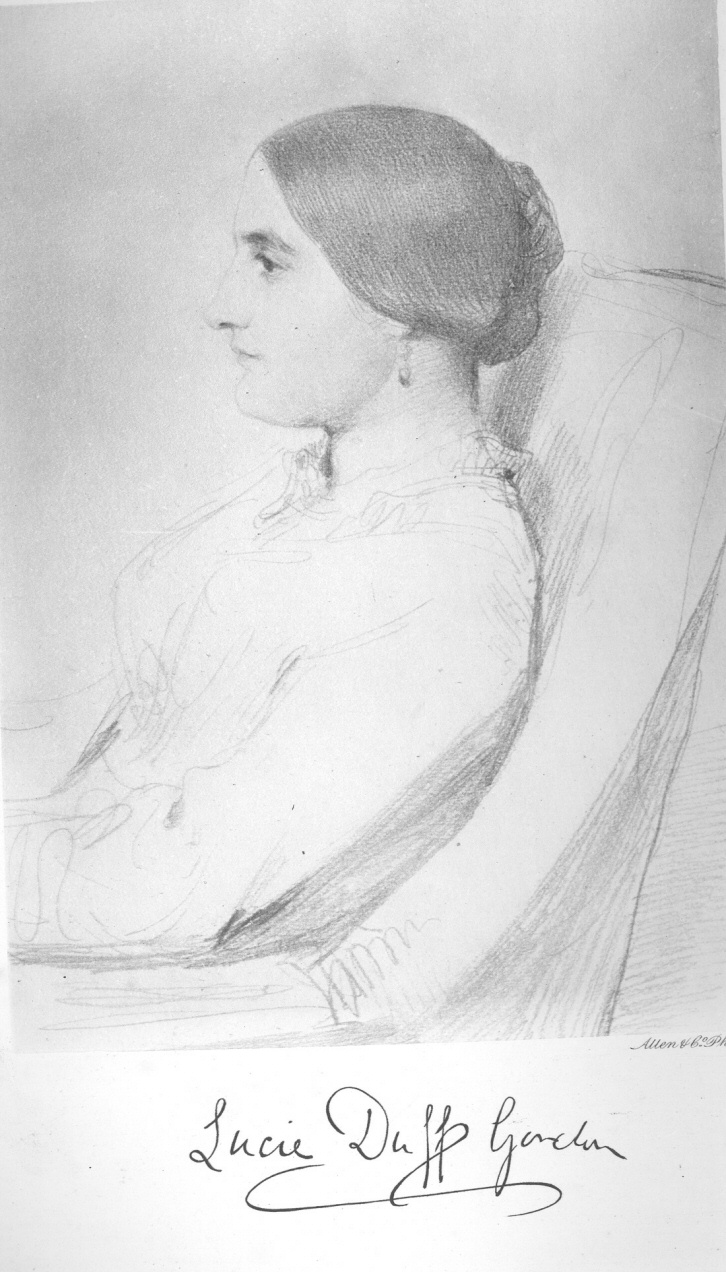
- Lucie, Lady Duff Gordon, a sketch by George Frederic Watts R.A. about 1848 (Note: The frontispiece of Letters from Egypt, taken from a photogravure of a sketch (Duff-Gordon 1902, See list of illustrations after contents and before the Introduction.))
- Born: Lucie Austin; 24 June 1821; Queen Square, Westminster, England
- Died: 14 July 1869 (aged 48); Cairo, Egypt
- Resting place: Cairo, Egypt
- Occupations: Author, translator
- Spouse: Alexander Duff-Gordon (m. 1840)
- Children: 3, including Janet Ross
- Parent(s): John Austin; Sarah Austin
- Relatives: Lina Waterfield (granddaughter); Gordon Waterfield (great-grandson); Antony Beevor (great-great-grandson); Henry Reeve (cousin)
- Writing career
- Pen name: Lucie Gordon
- Language: English

Lucie, Lady Duff-Gordon (née Austin; 24 June 1821 – 14 July 1869) was an English author and translator who wrote as Lucie Gordon. She is best known for her Letters from Egypt, 1863–1865 (1865) and Last Letters from Egypt (1875), most of which are addressed to her husband, Alexander Duff-Gordon, and her mother, Sarah Austin. Having moved in prominent literary circles in London, she contracted tuberculosis and travelled in 1861 to South Africa for health reasons. She travelled on to Egypt in 1862 where she settled in Luxor, learnt Arabic, and wrote many letters about Egyptian culture, religion, and customs. Her letters are notable for humour, outrage at the ruling Ottomans, and many personal stories from the people around her.

== Early life ==
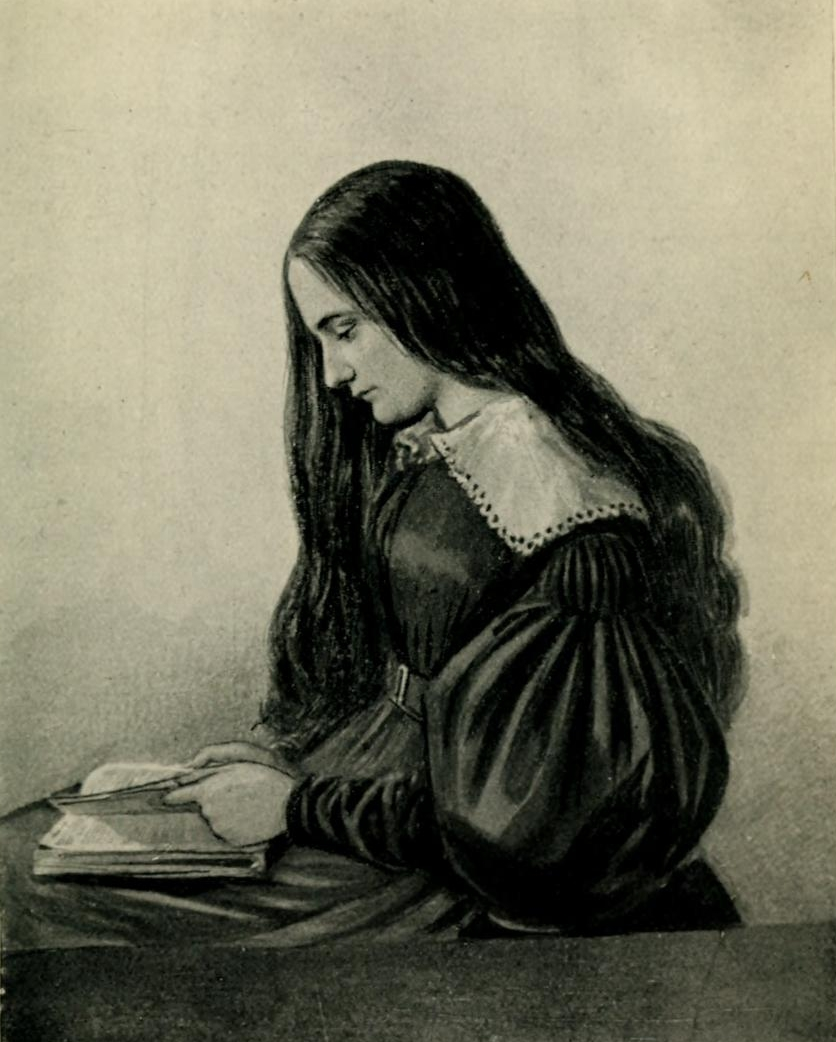
A sketch by a school friend of Lucie Austin aged 15

Lucie Austin was born on 24 June 1821, in Queen Square, Westminster, to John Austin (1790–1859), a jurist, and his wife, Sarah Austin, a translator. Lucie's father was a professor of jurisprudence and a noted intellectual while her mother was well educated for a woman of the time, used to discussing politics on an equal footing with men.

Her parents' only child, her chief playfellows were her first cousin Henry Reeve, and the teenage John Stuart Mill. Inheriting her parents' talents Lucie developed a strong love of reading and as she grew in vigour and in sense, she developed a strong tinge of originality and independence, with a marked love of animals. Her childhood included the elderly Jeremy Bentham (who had founded Utilitarianism) take her around his garden in an activity they called "ante-prandial circumgyration".

In 1826 she went with her parents to Bonn on the Rhine, and stayed sufficiently long enough to return speaking fluent German. She had scant regular instruction, but was for a short time at a mixed school of boys and girls kept by George Edward Biber at Hampstead, where she learnt Latin.

By the age of 13 she was reading the "Odyssey" in the original. She also kept her pet snake twined into her plaited hair, and was thought to be "un peu unmanageable" by her mother and "a potential homicide" by a friend of the family. Following the breakdown of her father's health, which had always been delicate, the family moved to Boulogue-sur-Mer where they lived from 1834 to 1836. In 1836, her father was appointed as a Royal Commissioner to inquire into the grievances in Malta. While his wife accompanied him, the climate was considered too hot for a young girl so Lucie was sent to Miss Shepherd's school at Bromley. Her parents were Unitarians, but at the age of 16 Lucie insisted on being baptised and confirmed as a member of the Church of England. As a girl she made the acquaintance of Heinrich Heine. Lord Houghton's Monographs Personal and Social, 1873, pp.323–32 contains an affecting narrative of her visits to the poet in Paris in 1854 shortly before his death.

== Marriage ==
Upon her parents' return to England in 1838, Lucie attended her first society ball, held at Lansdowne House, the London home of the Marquess of Lansdowne. Here she met Sir Alexander Cornewall Duff-Gordon, 3rd Baronet, of Halkin, who was ten years her senior. As her father descended into melancholy and self-doubt, her mother took on work as a translator, writing for various periodicals and as a teacher to support the family. Lucie was allowed to meet and walk out alone with Duff-Gordon. One day he said to her: "Miss Austin, do you know people say we are going to be married?". Annoyed at being talked of, and hurt at his brusque way of mentioning it, she was just going to give a sharp answer, when he added: "Shall we make it true?" to which she replied with the monosyllable "Yes". The couple were married on 16 May 1840 in Kensington Old Church, despite the initial objections by the groom's mother over Lucie's lack of a dowry.

Following her marriage at the age of 18, Lucie, Lady Duff-Gordon continued with translating and various other writing projects.

The couple lived at 8 Queen Square, Westminster, a house with a statue of Queen Anne at one end, since renumbered as 15 Queen Anne's Gate. Here a circle of friends and acquaintances often met. Lord Lansdowne, Lord Monteagle, Caroline Norton, Dickens, Thackeray, Elliot Warburton, Tom Taylor, Tennyson, Alexander Kinglake, and Henry Taylor were habitués, and on one occasion Leopold von Ranke was among the visitors.

A noted character in the establishment in Queen Square was a Nubian boy called Hassan el Bakkeet, who had been enslaved before being rescued by English missionaries. He had then obtained a position as a servant but after he was threatened with blindness his employer had sacked him. As he had occasionally delivered messages to Queen Square, he found his way, as he explained, 'to die on the threshold of the beautiful pale lady.' He was found crouching on Lady Duff-Gordon's doorstep one night, when she was returning from a theatrical party at Charles Dickens's home. She took el Bakkeet in, had his eyes treated and his condition cured. He became known as Hatty, and was employed as Lady Duff-Gordon's devoted servant and well known to visitors. He was also a playmate to her daughter Janet, to the horror of a visiting American author, a Mr. Hilliard, who asked Lady Duff-Gordon how she could let a negro touch her child, whereupon she called Janet and Hatty to her, and kissed each of them. Hatty contracted consumption and died in the Westminster Hospital in 1850.

As her parents had settled in Weybridge the Duff-Gordons spent some summers with them. The house was cold and damp, which lead Janet Duff- Gordon to attribute her mother's later bad health to the incessant colds she caught there. While living at Weybridge in 1850 Lady Duff-Gordon established and superintended a working-men's library and reading-room. Following the birth of her son Maurice in 1849, Lady Duff-Gordon began to succumb to tuberculosis and by the winter of 1861 she had become so ill that her doctors advised her to travel to a warmer, drier climate. After trying Ventnor for two winters, she went on a voyage to the Cape of Good Hope in 1860. An account of this appeared in Francis Galton's Vacation Tourist, 1862–63, pp.119–222, under the title "Letters from the Cape".

== Egypt ==
Upon her return to England, she was persuaded to go to Eaux Bonnes in the autumn of 1862, which negatively affected her health. Lady Duff-Gordon then decided to visit the newly fashionable Egypt, leaving her husband and children behind in England. While she was familiar with the country from reading Herodotus, the Bible, Arabian Nights and Alexander William Kinglake's Eothan, they hadn't prepared her for the realities of modern Egypt when she disembarked in Alexandria in October 1862.

She noted "what is not pleasant is the absence of all brightness or gaiety, even from young and childish faces." Despite this she made Egypt her home for the rest of her life with the exception of two short visits to England in 1863 and 1865. Open to other cultures and a supporter of working-class politics in the United Kingdom, Lady Duff-Gordon's sympathies were with the hard-working fellahin (peasantry) of Egypt. During the first years of her residence on the Nile she wrote numerous letters to her family, in which she gave vivid descriptions of Eastern life and many details of domestic manners and customs. These were collected and edited by her mother Sarah Austin and published as Letters from Egypt, 1863–1865 in May 1865 to provide money to support her in exile. The publication was the first really intimate picture written by a European of a country that was in vogue in the West. The image it created of her heroic struggle with consumption while far from home captured the imagination of the reading public. In many of her letters she made frequent scathing remarks about the British abroad and the Egyptian government. The book was so popular that the book went through three editions in its first year of publication. As a result of her literary fame, many British travellers passing through Luxor made a point of calling on her, including the writer Edward Lear in January 1867 and the Prince and Princess of Wales in February 1869. She found the city more to her liking describing it as "a golden existence, all sunshine and poetry, and I must add kindness and civility."

Hiring a servant Omar, who was known by his nickname Abu Halawy ("father of sweets") Lady Duff-Gordon proceeded upstream. After 10 days on the Nile she observed that she was sleeping and eating better and coughing less. By the time the boat reached Asyut after three weeks of travel, she was in love with Egypt despite having no interest in country's ancient monuments. Lady Duff-Gordon returned to England in June 1863 but her health continued to fail and so both for its sake and because of her enthrallment with the country, she returned to Egypt in October of the same year. As it was by then winter she found that Cairo was too cold and damp, so relocated to Luxor. She was able to persuade the French consul to allow her to take up residence in Luxor what was called "The French House", a large ramshackle building located on top of the dirt and debris that covered Luxor Temple right up to its roof. She described it in a letter to her husband in 1864 as "The view all round my house is magnificent on every side, over the Nile in front facing north-west and over a splendid range of green and distant orange buff hills to the south-east, where I have a spacious covered terrace."

On a journey down the Nile in 1865 she nearly died of pleurisy and was nursed back to health by her servant Omar.

Throughout her long stay in Egypt she won golden opinions from the local people. Her unvarying kindness, her attention to the sick, her charm, and her sympathy with the oppressed, endeared her to the people, to whom she was known as "Noor ala Noor" (light from the light) and Sitt el Kebeer (Great Lady), who "was just and had a heart that loved the Arabs". During an epidemic in the spring of 1864 Egyptians preferred to rather than the government clinics. She also gained a reputation for having a "lucky eye" and thus being regarded as a bringer of good luck was called upon for numerous flavours including visiting houses under construction, inspecting cattle and young brides.

She was outspoken about the profligacy of Egypt's ruler Ismail, who made an attempt to bribe a boatman to drown her, but her popularity saved her. Some of her letters were intercepted by the Government and never delivered. One of her original donkey boys was Muhammad Mohassib, who later would become a well-known antiquities dealer in Luxor.

In December 1867, six days prior to her return from a trip away, part of the French House collapsed following a flood into the temple below.

== Death ==
Lady Duff-Gordon's condition worsened in early 1869 forcing her to move, in search of better terminal care, to the spa resort of Helwan, just south of Cairo where she died on 13 July 1869, aged 48. She was buried in the English cemetery there. Her husband died in London on 27 October 1872 aged 61.

== Personal life ==
She and Duff-Gordon had four children. Their daughter Janet Ann Ross was born in 1842 and died in 1927. Their second child was born in 1849 but died after only a few months of life. Their third child Maurice (1849–1896) became Sir Maurice Duff-Gordon, 4th Baronet. Their fourth child Urania Duff-Gordon was born in 1858 and died on 22 September 1877.

Sir Maurice's daughter Caroline "Lina" (1874–1964) became an author and foreign correspondent for The Observer; she was the mother of author Gordon Waterfield and grandmother of the historian Sir Antony Beevor.

== Works ==
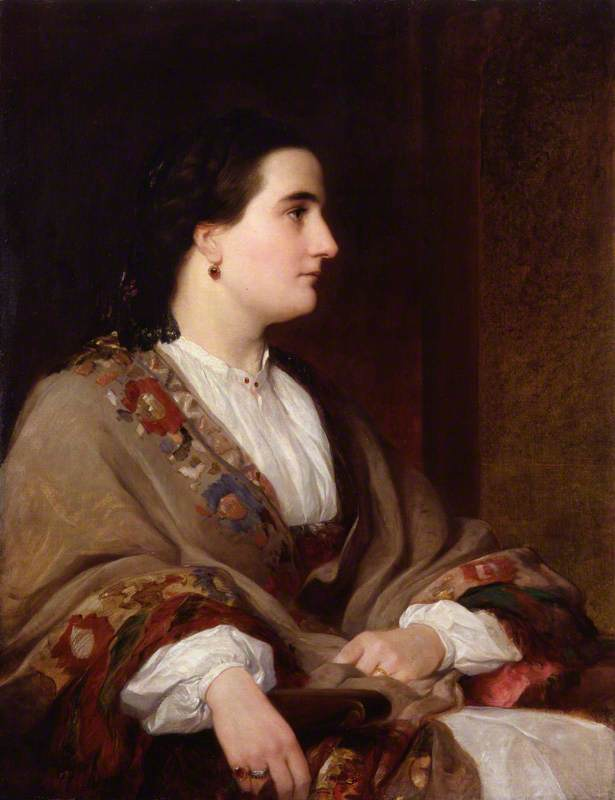
Lucie, Lady Duff-Gordon by Henry W. Phillips (c. 1851)

Lucie Austin commenced her literary life with translations, her earliest work being Barthold Niebuhr's Studies of Ancient Grecian Mythology, which was published in 1839 under her mother's name. In 1844 she translated Wilhelm Meinhold's Mary Schweidler, the Amber Witch, a narrative dressed up as a 17th-century chronicle, and concocted to discredit rationalist methods of biblical criticism. In 1845 she published The French in Algiers, from the German and French of C. Lamping, and in 1846 Narrative of Remarkable Criminal Trials, by P. J. A. von Feuerbach.

In 1847 she and her husband Sir Alexander Duff-Gordon, translated Memoirs of the House of Brandenberg, by L. von Ranke.

She translated Stella and Vanessa, a romance by A. F. L. de Wailly, and in 1853 two other works: The Village Doctor, by the Countess d'Arbouville, and Ferdinand I and Maximilian II of Austria, by L. von Ranke. In 1854 she translated The Russians in Bulgaria and Roumelia, 1828–29, by Baron von Moltke. She edited The History and Literature of the Crusades, by H. C. L. von Sybel, in 1861.

=== Letters from Egypt ===
The first volume of Lady Duff-Gordon's Letters from Egypt was published by Macmillan and Co. in May 1865, with a preface by her mother, Sarah Austin. This book is the best known and considered the most interesting of her productions. In 1875 a volume containing the Last Letters from Egypt, to which were added Letters from the Cape, reprinted from Vacation Tourists (1864), with a memoir of Lady Duff-Gordon by her daughter Janet Ross was published by Macmillan and Co. A second edition appeared in 1876. In 1902 a revised edition was published by R. Brimley Johnson with a memoir of Lady Duff-Gordon by her daughter Janet Ross and a new introduction by George Meredith. This had the letters as they were written, omitting only the purely family matter which her daughter deemed as of no interest to the public.

== In literature ==
Lady Duff-Gordon is one of the characters in the novel The Mistress of Nothing by Kate Pullinger.

Lady Duff-Gordon's daughter (Janet Ross) recalled, "Tennyson told my mother that he had her in mind when he wrote 'The Princess'. I don't think she was as much flattered as many of his admirers would have been."
