= Charles Howard Johnson =

American illustrator and newspaper artist

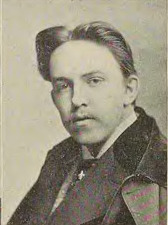
- Born: Charles Howard Johnson; December , 1865; Vincennes, Indiana
- Died: July 3, 1896 (aged 30); New York City, New York, U.S.
- Known for: Illustration

Charles Howard Johnson (December, 1865 – July 3, 1896) was an American illustrator and newspaper artist, best known for his sparse illustrations of the 1890 U.S. edition of The Princess by the English poet Alfred Lord Tennyson and illustrating many periodicals during the latter part of the 1890's.

== Early life and education ==
Little is known of Johnson's life. He was born in Vincennes, Indiana in 1865, and moved to New York City in about 1889 after studying art for a year in Cincinnati, Ohio.

== Career ==
He worked for a number of magazines including Life, Truth, Munsey's Magazine, and on some of the daily newspapers. He illustrated more than ten books.

He was particularly effective in decorative work, often making the pictures fantastical. Though his skill as an artist was widely recognized during his lifetime.

The work "A Young Girl Dancing" (1893, Pen and Ink) captures his whimsical skill.

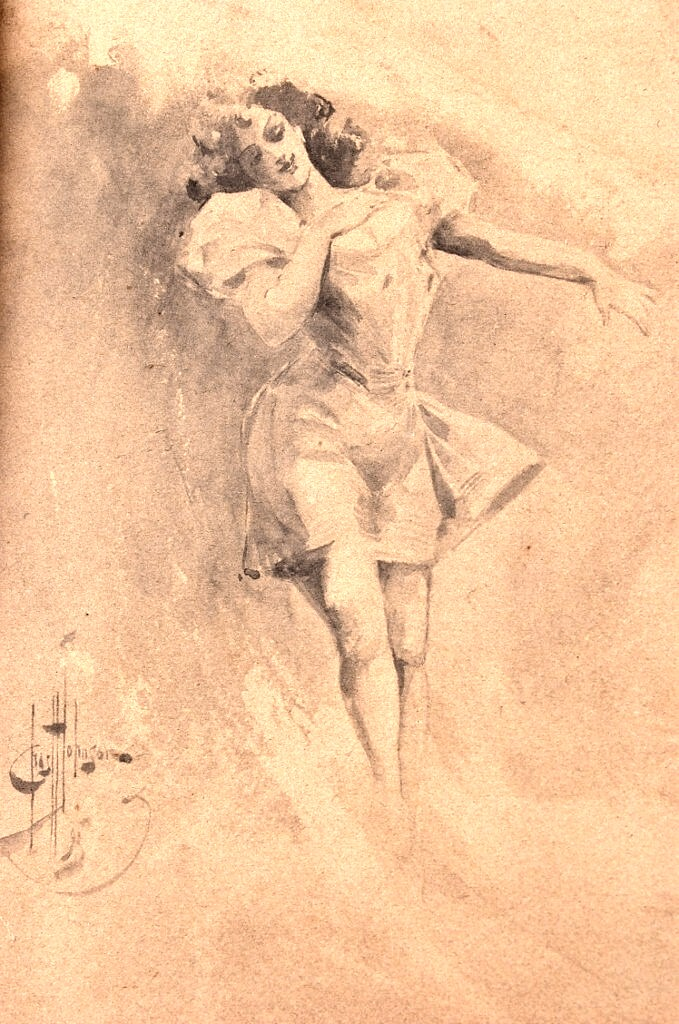
Young Girl Dancing

== Personal life ==
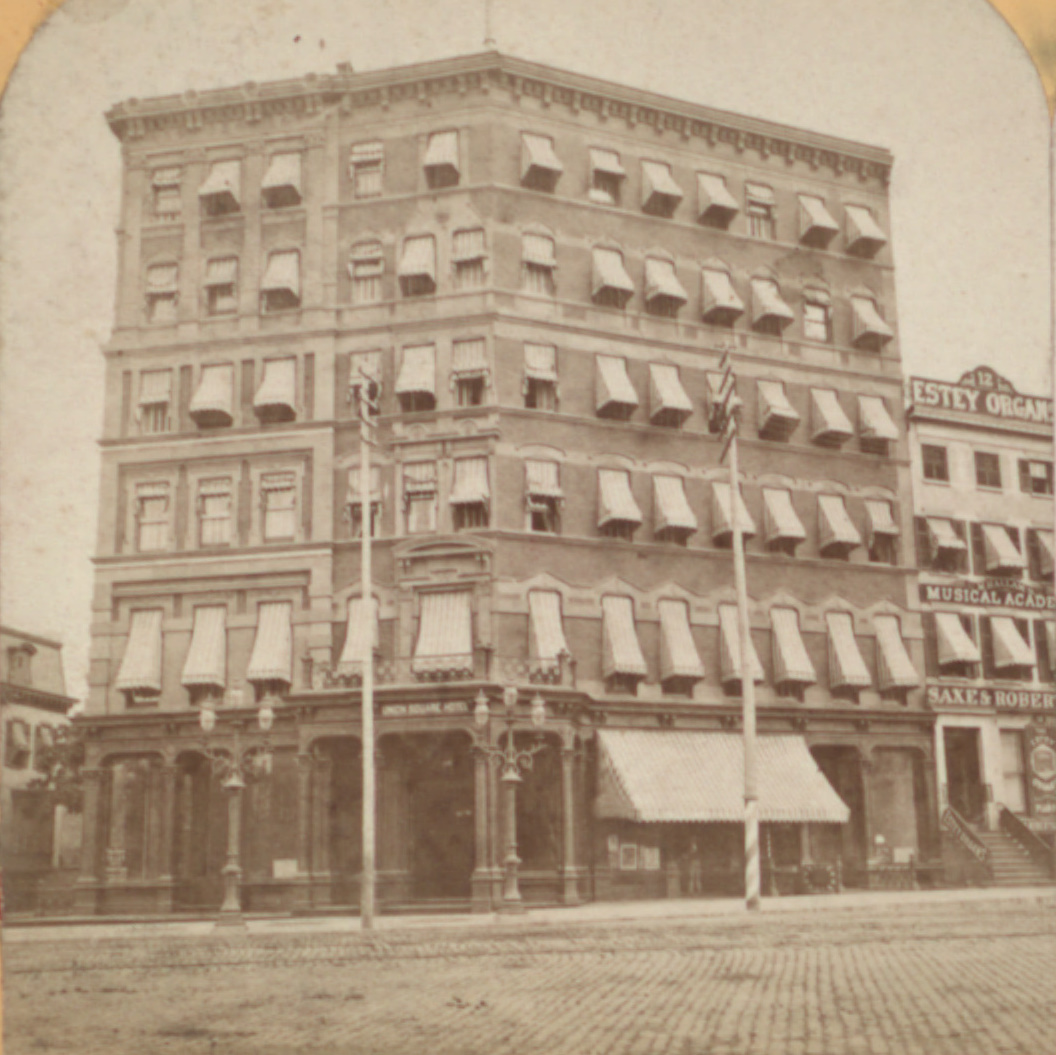
Johnson died of brain fever on July 3, 1896, at his apartment in the Union Square Hotel at the southeast corner of 15th Street and Union Square East. Built in 1872, it was demolished in 1986 to make way for the Zeckendorf Towers

He was engaged to be married to the actress Elita Proctor Otis, before he died at his apartment in the Union Square Hotel of brain fever on July 3, 1896, after an illness of ten days. His wife (one "Miss Gallagher") had died two years earlier, with whom he had a daughter named Gladys born 1887-1891.
