= Theresa Earle =

English horticulturist (1836–1925)

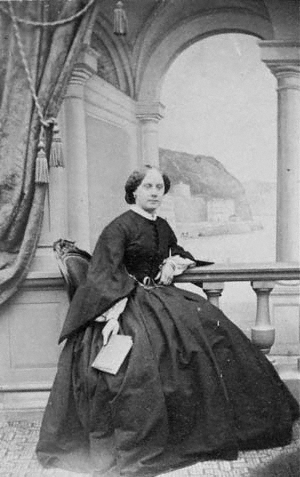
- Born: Maria Theresa Villiers; 8 June 1836; London
- Died: 27 February 1925 (aged 88); Cobham
- Occupation: writer
- Known for: "Mrs C. W. Earle" - gardening writer
- Spouse: Captain Charles William Earle
- Children: three sons

(Maria) Theresa Earle born (Maria) Theresa Villiers writing as Mrs C. W. Earle (8 June 1836 – 27 February 1925) was a British horticulturist. She published three Pot-Pourri gardening guides starting in 1897.

== Life ==
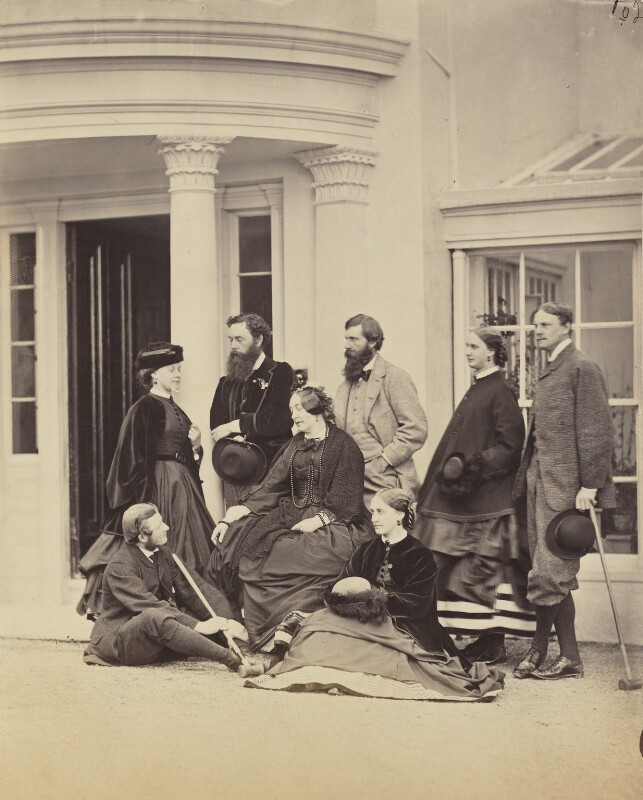
Villiers family group inc Edith Villiers

Earle was born in 1836 in London into the Villiers family. She was invited to serve at Queen Victoria's court but refused in 1856. Her family gave her the nickname of "Radical Theresa".

She and her husband moved to a new house in Cobham in Surrey called Woodlands, although she had a house in London too. There, she turned her interest to gardening and her creation was admired. She had help from one gardener and his boy assistant.

In 1897 her gardening guide Pot-Pourri from a Surrey Garden was published. She had been encouraged to write this by friends and had been supported by her niece Constance Lytton who typed some of the text. The book sold quickly and well and in one of the later editions Constance Lytton added a section of Japanese flower arranging.

In 1899 she published "More Pot-pourri from a Surrey Garden" which was by "Mrs. C.W. Earle". There were eventually three Pot-purri books and they were said to be the model for the early books of Gertrude Jekyll. Jekyll became a friend of hers. There were no more of her own gardening books but she collaborated with Ethel Case on two others. Her last two books were about her family history and her biography.

Earle died at her home, Woodlands, in Cobham in 1925.

== Personal life ==
She married Captain Charles William Earle at St Paul's Church, Knightsbridge in 1864 after he returned from service with the army in India. Compared to her sisters this was a marriage to someone below her social position. Charles became a successful businessman and they had three sons. After her husband's death in 1897, she and their three sons had a memorial raised to her husband celebrating his life and military service in 1857 during the Indian Mutiny. The memorial is at St Dunstans Church in Liverpool.

=== Vegetarianism ===
Earle was a vegetarian. She advocated a vegetarian diet in her book Diet Difficulties with Notes on Growing Vegetables, published in 1908. Earle promoted a fruit and vegetable diet in which coffee and tea are forbidden. Earle was Constance Lytton's aunt and converted her to vegetarianism.

Earle was influenced by Alexander Haig's dietary theories. Her book A Third Pot-Pourri (1903) covered diet, health and vegetarianism. Adela Curtis, who taught meditation and was also a vegetarian assisted in preparing the book.

== Selected publications ==
- Pot-Pourri from a Surrey Garden (With an appendix by Lady Constance Lytton, 1898)
- More Pot-Pourri from a Surrey Garden (1900)
- A Third Pot-Pourri (1903)
- Diet Difficulties with Notes on Growing Vegetables (with Mrs. Hugh Bryan, 1908)
- Gardening for the Ignorant (with Miss Ethel Case, 1912)
- Pot-Pourri Mixed by Two (with Miss Ethel Case, 1914)
