= Gordon Waterfield =

British journalist, broadcaster and writer

- Born: 1903
- Died: 1987 (aged 83–84)
- Mother: Lina Waterfield
- Relatives: Lucie Duff-Gordon (great-grandmother); Antony Beevor (nephew)
- Writing career
- Genre: Nonfiction
- Subject: History, travel

Gordon Waterfield (1903–1987) was a British journalist, broadcaster and writer. He is chiefly known for his book What Happened to France?, in which he documents his experiences as a journalist in France during World War II.

He was featured on the 1973 documentary The World at War.

== Selected works ==
- Lucie Duff Gordon in England, South Africa and Egypt (1937).
- What Happened to France? (1940)
- Layard of Nineveh (1963)
- Egypty (1967)
- Sultans of Aden (1968).
- Professional Diplomat: Sir Percy Loraine of Kirkharle. (1973)
