= Lina Waterfield =

English journalist and author

Lina Waterfield OBE
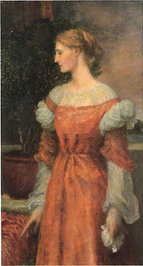
- Lina Duff Gordon in 1898, by George Frederic Watts, costumed after Leonardo da Vinci
- Born: Caroline Lucie Duff-Gordon; 16 August 1874; Saint-Germain-en-Laye, France
- Died: 27 November 1964 (aged 90); Sandwich, Kent, England
- Occupations: Author, Italian correspondent
- Spouse: Aubrey Waterfield (m. 1902; died 1944)
- Children: 3, including Gordon Waterfield
- Relatives: Janet Ross (paternal aunt); Lucie, Lady Duff-Gordon (grandmother); Antony Beevor (grandson)

Caroline Lucie "Lina" Waterfield OBE (16 August 1874 – 27 November 1964) was an English author and Italian correspondent for The Observer and The Sunday Times. She founded the library which became the British Institute of Florence.

== Early life ==
Lina Duff-Gordon was the only child of Maurice Duff-Gordon and his wife, Fanny. Maurice was the son and heir of Sir Alexander Cornewall Duff-Gordon, 3rd Baronet, and his wife, the writer Lucie, Lady Duff-Gordon. Waterfield was born on 16 August 1874 in Saint-Germain-en-Laye, near Paris. In 1884 her father inherited and moved the family to Fyvie Castle in Scotland, but he subsequently went to live with a mistress, whom he later married, and Lina was sent to a Catholic convent school in Paris. Her mother asked Janet Ross, Maurice's sister, to pay for Lina to attend a convent school in Paris, and since she had terminal cancer, arranged for Ross and her husband Henry to adopt her. Fanny Duff-Gordon died early in 1890, and after Lina wrote that she was being pressured to become a nun, in December she moved into the Ross' residence, Poggio Gherardo in Settignano near Florence. Her father gave permission for her adoption early in 1891, and she spent the rest of her childhood there, finishing her education with friends of her aunt's such as the artist Carlo Orsi and Guido Biagi, the head of the Laurentian Library.

Lina Waterfield was progressive in her politics following her adoption by the Ross family. She decorated the walls of her room with pictures of heroes of the Risorgimento and refused to be presented at Court. By 1914 she was a suffragette.

As a young woman she was considered a beauty and was painted by George Frederic Watts, costumed based on Leonardo da Vinci.

While living with her aunt, she developed a close friendship with Margaret 'Madge' Symonds, a daughter of John Addington Symonds, with whom she wrote her first book, on Perugia, on a commission from J. M. Dent. She later became friendly with and took art tours with Bernard Berenson and his mistress, later wife, Mary Smith. In 1897 on a visit to England she met the painter Aubrey Waterfield, whom she married in London on 1 July 1902 despite her aunt's objections; her adoptive father, Henry Ross, died 18 days later. After her marriage she was painted with her husband by Charles Furse in The Return from the Ride.

== Writing career ==
After living in Palermo while researching a book together, the newly married couple then spent three months in Rome creating another book on a short deadline, before leasing the Fortezza della Brunella near Aulla, which became their primary home; they purchased it in 1924. Until the First World War they also leased Northbourne Court in Kent as their English residence. They had three children, Gordon (1903–1987), John (1909–1942) and Carinthia (1911–1995, known as Kinta). In her autobiography, Kinta wrote: "It was often said of my parents that they had all of the luxuries of life but none of the necessities."

During the First World War, the Italian Socialists spread anti-British propaganda, which Lina Waterfield sought to counter. In 1916 she founded a British centre in the form of a library in Florence; with the assistance of John Buchan, at the time a leading propagandist in London, this became the British Institute of Florence, the first such institution, and was officially opened by the British ambassador in 1918; she later received the OBE for this work.

She became Italian correspondent for The Observer in 1921. She interviewed Mussolini several times before and after his rise to power and clearly described Fascist brutality in her reports. J. L. Garvin, the editor, ultimately ended her position with The Observer in 1935 over the strength of her anti-fascism; he believed Britain must maintain a relationship with Italy to forestall its becoming allied with Nazi Germany.

Waterfield's aunt Janet Ross died in 1927. She bequeathed Poggio Gherardo to the Waterfields' second son, John, with a life interest for Lina, and it became their primary residence. They left Italy after the outbreak of the Second World War, returning during the Phony War and caught the last train to France after a friend at the British Embassy sent them word on the eve of Italy's declaration of war in June 1940. John was killed in active service in Malta in 1942 and Aubrey died in 1944. After the End of World War II in Europe, Lina returned to Poggio Gherardo in January 1946, having been invited by Ian Fleming to be the Italian correspondent for The Sunday Times. He sent her telegrams requesting reports on such topics as what the Italians did "on a bender". She continued as correspondent for Kemsley Newspapers until 1950, when she sold the estate and moved back to the Fortezza della Brunella; in 1952 she returned to England to live with her daughter Kinta in Kent. Lina Waterfield died in Sandwich on 27 November 1964.

== Books ==
Waterfield began her writing career with books in the "Mediæval Towns" series on commission from Dent, beginning with The Story of Perugia (with Margaret Symonds, published 1898) and continuing with The Story of Assisi (1900). She was commissioned to write The Story of Palermo, to be illustrated by her husband, but Dent decided instead to have Lina co-write and Aubrey illustrate Rome and Its Story (1904). She later wrote Concise and Practical Guide to Rome (1905). After the Second World War, she wrote Florence: A Short Guide to the Art Treasures of Florence (1950).

She wrote two autobiographical works: Home Life in Italy: Letters from the Apennines (1908), again illustrated by her husband, and Castle in Italy: An Autobiography (1961), in which she misstated the birth years of two of her children. In 1993 her daughter and grandson sued Joanna Trollope on the grounds that her novel also titled A Castle in Italy, written under the pseudonym Caroline Harvey, paralleled Lina Waterfield's memoir overly closely.

Janet Ross's successful cookery book, Leaves from our Tuscan Kitchen, was originally her idea.

== Archive ==
The Waterfield Collection of papers is held at the British Institute of Florence.
