= Thomas Wylde (clothier) =

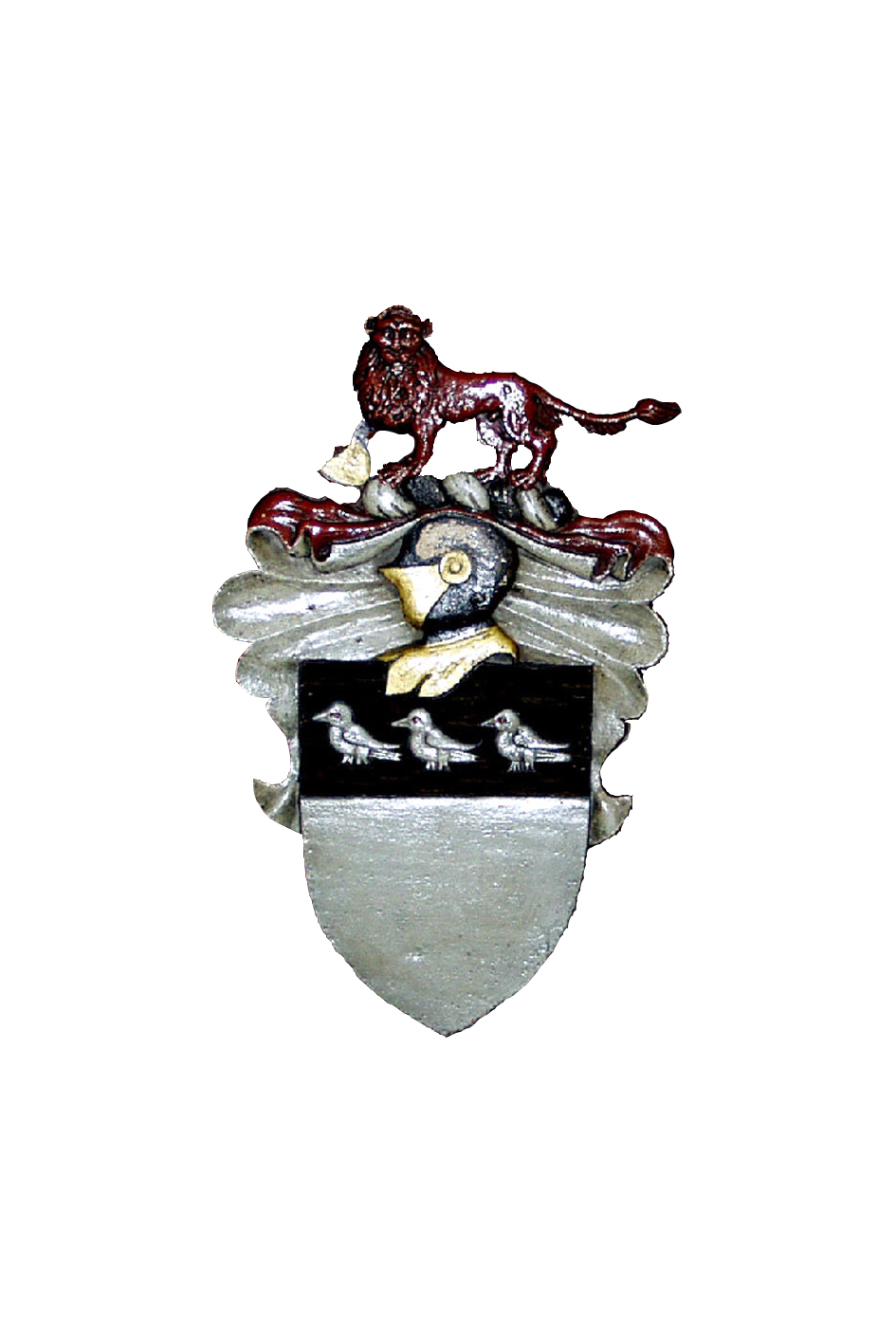
Arms of Wylde, detail from monument in Worcester Cathedral

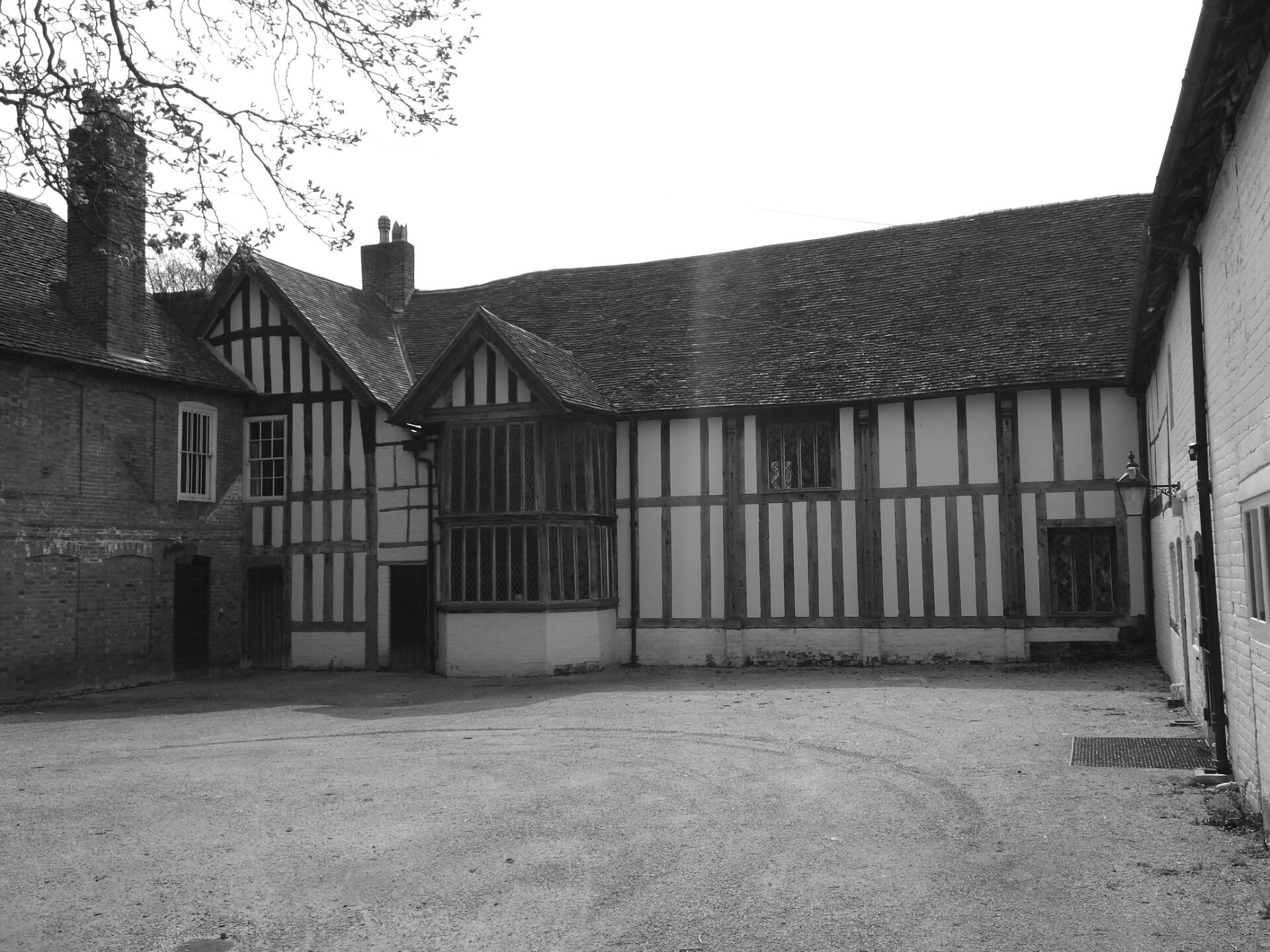
The Commandery, Worcester, acquired by Thomas Wylde following the Dissolution of the Monasteries

Thomas Wylde (bef.1508 – 1559) of The Commandery, Worcester, England, was a wealthy and prominent cloth merchant.

== Origins ==
He was the son of Simon Wylde of The Ford, near Dodderhill (where Thomas later acquired the manor of Impney).

== Offices ==
=== Parliament ===
He served as a Member of Parliament for Worcester.
He was elected to the Parliament of 1547 in 1551 to fill a vacancy. He was re-elected in 1558. shortly before his death.

=== City of Worcester ===
- Chamberlain: 1545–1546
- Bailiff: 1547–1548
- Alderman: 1548
- Bridgemaster: 1554–1555
- Member of Parliament: (first elected) 1551
- Member of the Twenty-Four: 1555
- Auditor: 1555–1556

== Business ==
By late medieval times the population of Worcester had grown to around 10,000 as the manufacture of cloth started to become a large local industry. The town was designated a county corporate, giving it autonomy from local government.

Thomas Wylde was a clothier. It is believed he made the greatest part of his fortune when the wool trade with the Low Countries was blocked by war. His business at Worcester, then a centre of cloth manufacture, was so prosperous that not long after the dissolution of the monasteries by Henry VIII he purchased the site and surviving buildings of an old religious foundation at Worcester called the Hospital or more familiarly "The Commandery". At his death his house had 31 rooms, one of them containing 20 feather beds. It was to remain in the Wylde family until 1785.

An overmantel with arched panels and Wylde heraldry (dated c. 1594) has been relocated to the north-west room of the garden wing. The principal items of architectural interest are the Great Hall (constructed in the 1470s), a notable staircase of about 1600 and in a separate wing the Solar of similar detail to the hall. A remarkable survival is a painted chamber with stencilled decoration and wall paintings of religious subjects believed to have been made about 1490 and rediscovered in 1935: ceiling – the Trinity; north wall – St Michael weighing souls; south wall – the martyrdom of St Erasmus and St Thomas Becket, with some others.

== The Commandery ==
Bought by Wylde in 1544 from Henry VIII's propagandist Richard Morrison, the complex of buildings comprising the hospital of St Wulfstan is said to have been founded in 1085, though it may have been up to two centuries later. It served as an almshouse as well as a place of hospitality for travellers. It is situated just outside Worcester's Sidbury Gate on the London road and had been disused after its suppression in 1540 following the dissolution of the monasteries. Then, like many establishments of the Knights of St John of Jerusalem (known as the Commandery), it has kept that name. The present building, largely of close-studding is mostly late 15th century, much of it later clad with brick or rendered. It now forms an irregular extended H-plan, but was probably originally built around two courtyards.

At the time of the final battle of the Civil War the house then in the occupation of great-great-grandson Thomas Wylde (1622–1669) was made the headquarters of Charles II's Royalist army. The Duke of Hamilton was to die there, sealing his fate by refusing the amputation of his wounded leg. In the 20th century the house was made the nation's prime Civil War museum. An old mound in the grounds used previously to defend Sidbury Gate was fortified in 1651 and is now known as Fort Royal. Fort Royal and that part of its park are now separated from the house by Wyld(e)'s Lane.

The Commandery, outside Sidbury Gate, Worcester
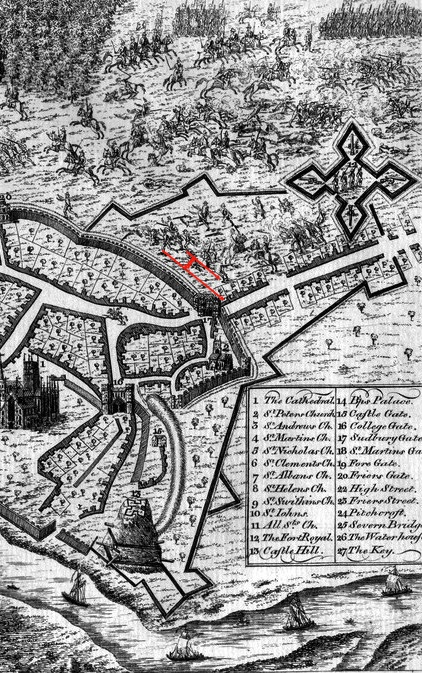
The Commandery and its fortified grounds: Royalist headquarters, 3 September 1651

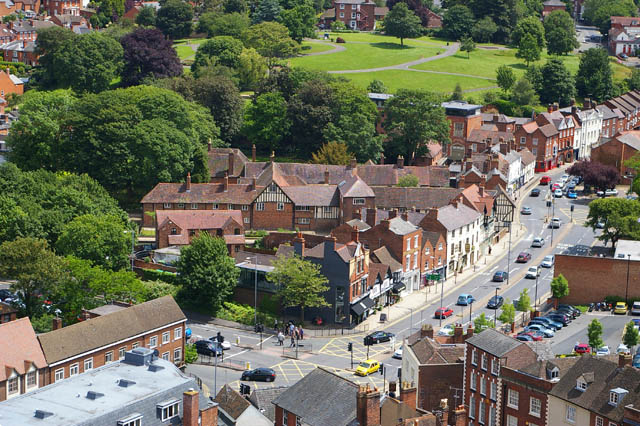
Looking east over Sidbury Gate from the cathedral's tower. The Commandery and remainder of its park

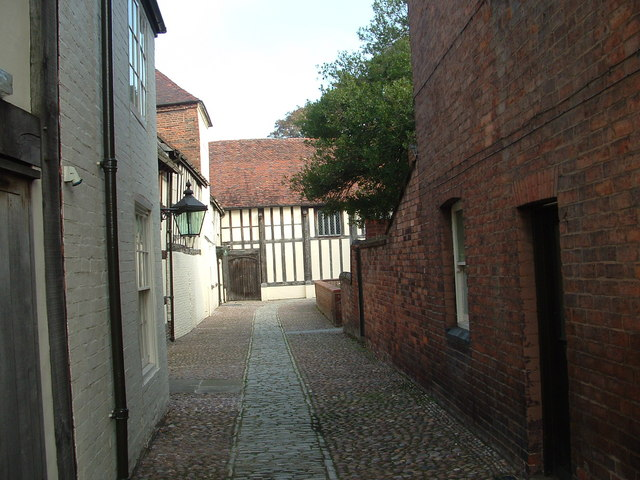
Entrance from beside Sidbury Gate, leading to the south front of the Great Hall 1470

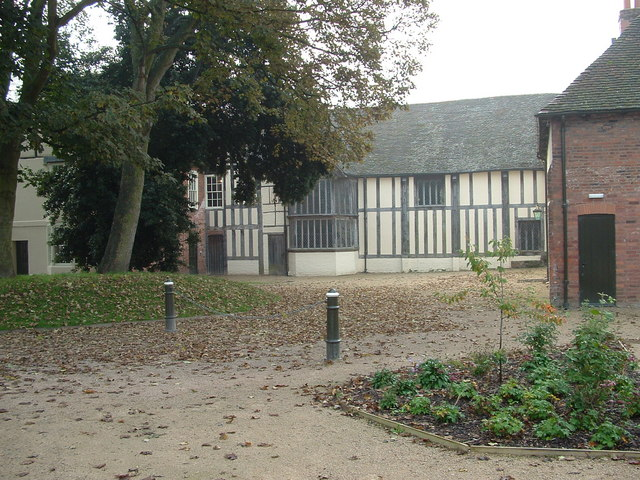
The north front of the Great Hall. The Solar is above the east (original entrance) front to the left of the picture

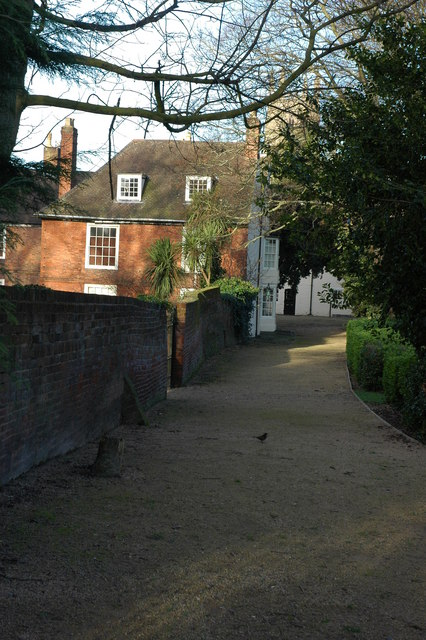
A 1708 part of the east front, the original entrance front is to the left of this garden wing

== Marriages and children ==
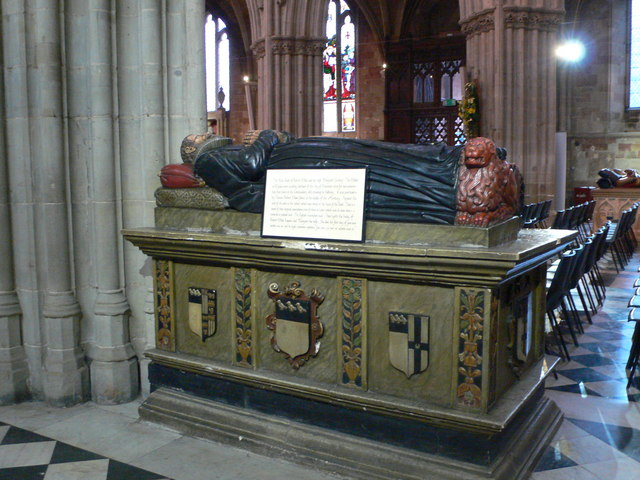
Monument with effigy in Worcester Cathedral of Robert Wylde, eldest son of Thomas Wylde by his first wife Alice Sudington

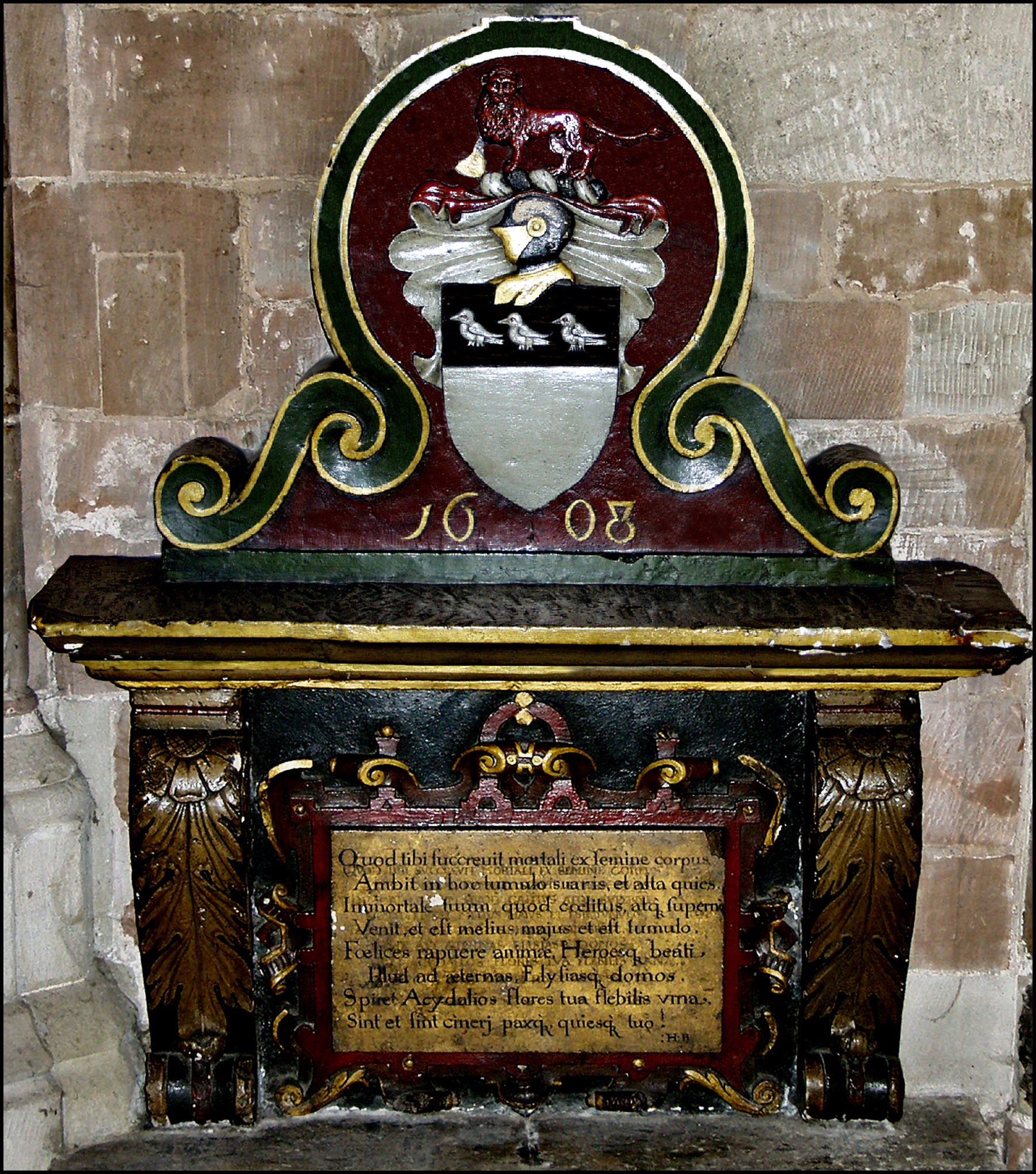
1608 Wylde monument, Worcester Cathedral

He married twice:

- Firstly, before 1529, to Alice Ledington (or Sudington), a daughter of Robert Ledington (or Sudington) of Worcester, by whom he had 1 son and 2 daughters including:
  - Robert Wylde (c.1535-1608), eldest son and heir, who married Margaret Cowling (c.1524-1606). His chest tomb monument with recumbent efigies survives in the nave of Worcester Cathedral under the fourth arch on the south side.
- Secondly to Eleanor Wall, a daughter and co-heiress of George Wall of Droitwich and widow of Edward Corbett, by whom he had 2 sons and 1 daughter, including:
  - George Wylde (1550–1616), of Heryots, Droitwich, thrice MP for Droitwich.

== Death ==
Thomas Wylde died on 11 August 1559 soon after Queen Elizabeth acceded to the throne on 17 November 1558.

== Charitable bequests ==
=== Worcester Free School ===
While attending parliament, Wylde obtained from the crown £6 a year for its master. He then bequeathed Little Pitchcroft and 4½ acres in Great Pitchcroft to re-establish the Free school, now the Royal Grammar School Worcester, and Trinity almshouses. In 1848 these endowments were described: "land now producing, with subsequent donations, an income of nearly £300 (1848): the buildings, situated partly in the parish of St. Nicholas, and partly in that of St. Swithun, consist of a schoolroom, with a dwelling-house for the master, and 29 apartments for the almspeople.

A school house at the current Royal Grammar School Worcester is named in Wylde's honour, in response to his contributions to the school.

=== Other bequests ===
His will has been lost but such portion of it which does survive within the Worcester city records includes in addition to arrangements for his widow and children and his brothers and sisters and his two fathers-in-law;

"Thomas Wylde, clothier, 1558, includes "Our blessed Lady" among the Divine Beings to whom he bequeaths his soul; desires "that there be at my burial as many prestes and clarckes to praye for my soule as may be convenyant, and a sermond made by some discrete lerned man, having for his paynes 6s. 8d.; "to twelve pore men to bear lightes at my buriall, a black gown each; "to the pore, to pray for my soule and all Christen sowles," .£13. 6s. 8d.; "lykewyse to the pore at or before my monthes mynde, "£6. 13s. 4d.

"Upon the highways between Worcester and Kempsey he orders £20 to be laid out. For "ye mariage of 20 maidens to be maryed within the cittie of Worcester within two yeares next after my deathe," £20, by 20s. each, at the discretion of the executors, "Where need shall require." He gave Little Pitchcroft and 4½ acres of meadow in Great Pitchcroft to the corporation on condition that within two years after his decease they shoidd erect and establish a free school in the city "to bringe uppe youthe in their A B, mattens, evensonge, and other lernynge, "which shall make them mete and reddie to ye Kinges gramer scole," but if not done within two years then the said lands to revert to his heirs,"if his wife married again, "then the children's portions to be put into the Chamber of the city, unless her husbande shall finde sufficient suretie for the same."

"To every one of his apprentices and journeymen he leaves a black coat and 6s. 8d., and to each of his maid servants a black gown and 6s. 8d. His wife and son Robert were appointed executors; and his father Walle, his father Ledington, and his cousin Heywood, are desired to be "overseers" of the will."

== Dynasty ==
Links to some notable descendants are highlighted. Following the sale of The Commandery in 1785 the principal line continued from Shropshire where the matrilineal name Browne was added in 1788 by letters patent to form Wylde-Browne.

Family of Thomas Wylde (clothier)

1. Alice Ledington	Thomas Wylde; 1508-1559	2. Elinor Wall
Robert; 1535-1608	George I 1550-1616	Thomas died 1599
Thomas; 1558-1610 m. Dorothy Berkeley	John; 1590-1689	George II; 1593-1650	Elizabeth m. Sir Walter Blount, 1st Baronet	Sir Edmund; 1588-1620	Elizabeth m. Sir Edward Bullock
Anne m. Charles West, Lord De La Warr	Edmund; 1618-1695
Robert; 1595-1650	Margaret m. Samuel Fell
Thomas; 1622-1669	Robert; 1622-1689	John Fell	Mary Fell m. Thomas Willis
Robert; 1643-1682	Thomas; 1670-1740	Thomas Willis; 1658-1693
Browne Willis; 1682-1760

=== Kin ===
Edmund Wylde (1618–1695), latterly of Glazeley, Shropshire and MP for Droitwich, having no heirs, left his considerable estates to Thomas Wylde (1670–1740) of The Commandery, enabling Thomas to serve in nine parliaments (between 1701 and 1727) to no profit to himself or his family.

Parliament of England
Preceded by John Braughing; Robert Youle	Member of Parliament for Worcester; 1551-1552; With: Robert Youle	Succeeded by William Robinson; Edward Brogden
Preceded by Robert Youle; William Adyes	Member of Parliament for Worcester; 1558-1559; With: Robert Youle	Succeeded by Richard Bullingham; Guthlac Edwards
