= Æneas John McIntyre =

British Liberal MP

Æneas John McIntyre QC (6 December 1821 – 19 September 1889) was a Liberal Party MP, who sat in the House of Commons from 1880 to 1885.

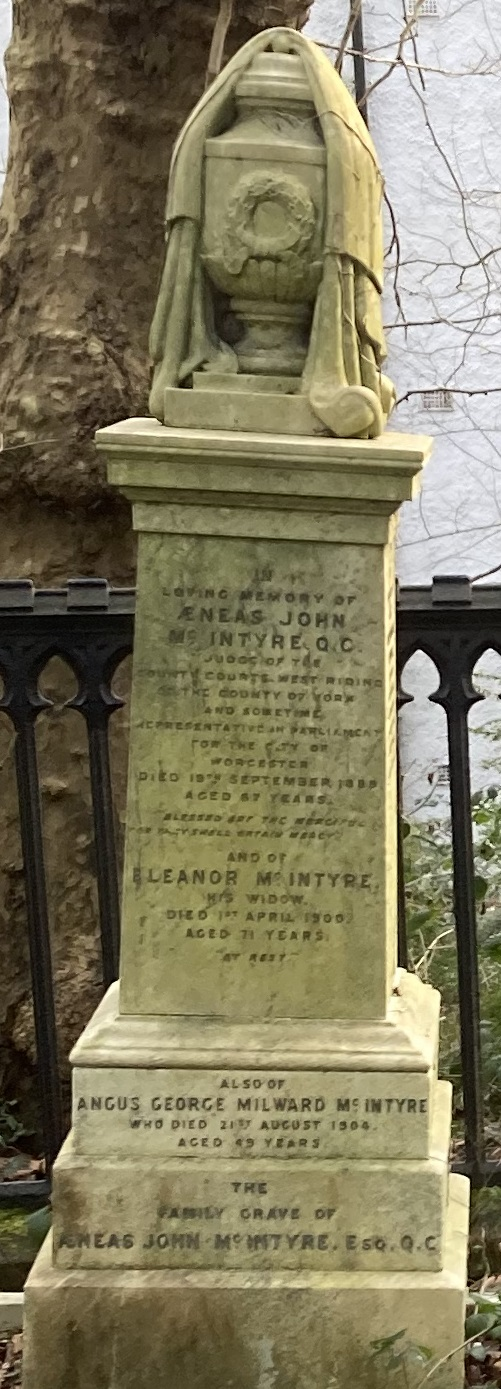
Family grave of Aeneas John McIntyre QC in Highgate Cemetery (west side)

== Career ==
Aeneas McIntyre joined the Middle Temple on 6 November 1843 and was called to the bar on 20 November 1846. On 8 February 1872 he was appointed Queen's Counsel and became a Bencher of his Inn on 27 May 1873. He went on the North Wales and Chester circuit and was elected a member of the Bar Committee in December 1883.

At the 1880 general election McIntyre was elected as one of the two Members of Parliament for Worcester. He held the seat until Worcester's representation was reduced to one seat under the Redistribution of Seats Act. At the 1880 general election he also unsuccessfully stood in Hackney North.

McIntyre was appointed County Court Judge for circuit No. 12 (Yorkshire) in January 1889.

== Personal life ==
Mclntyre was born in Clapham, Surrey in 1821, the only son of Aeneas Mclntyre LL.D. and F.L.S., of King's College, Aberdeen, and Hackney and his wife Charlotte Susanna Thompson (daughter of William Thomson of Jamaica).

He married Eleanor Corbett (daughter of George Corbett in Islington) in 1854. They had three children; Angus G. (1855 - 1904), Edith C. (1857 - 1912), and Mary E. (born 1860).

He died nine months after his appointment as a Judge at the age of 67, and is buried in Highgate Cemetery.

Parliament of the United Kingdom
Preceded by John Derby Allcroft; Thomas Rowley Hill	Member of Parliament for Worcester; 1880–1885; With: Thomas Rowley Hill	Succeeded by George Allsopp
