= George Ward, 1st Viscount Ward of Witley =

British Conservative politician

The Right Honourable The Viscount Ward of Witley PC

Secretary of State for Air
- In office 16 January 1957 – 28 October 1960
- Monarch: Elizabeth II
- Prime Minister: Harold Macmillan
- Preceded by: Nigel Birch
- Succeeded by: Julian Amery

Personal details
- Born: 20 November 1907
- Died: 15 June 1988 (aged 80)
- Party: Conservative
- Spouse(s): (1) Anne Capel (2) Barbara McNeill (d. 1980)
- Children: 2, including Georgina
- Parent(s): William Ward, 2nd Earl of Dudley; Rachel Gurney
- Education: Christ Church, Oxford

George Reginald Ward, 1st Viscount Ward of Witley, PC (20 November 1907 – 15 June 1988), styled The Honourable George Ward until 1960, was a British Conservative politician. He served as Secretary of State for Air under Harold Macmillan from 1957 to 1960.

== Background and education ==
Ward was the fourth and youngest son of William Ward, 2nd Earl of Dudley, and Rachel, daughter of Charles Henry Gurney. William Ward, 3rd Earl of Dudley was his eldest brother. He was educated at Eton and Christ Church, Oxford.

== Political career ==
During the Second World War, Ward served as a group captain in the RAF. At the 1945 general election he was elected to the House of Commons to represent Worcester for the Conservative Party, and held the seat until 1960. He served under Winston Churchill and Anthony Eden as Under-Secretary of State for Air from 1952 to 1955 and as Parliamentary and Financial Secretary to the Admiralty from 1955 to 1957. When Harold Macmillan became Prime Minister in January 1957, Ward was appointed Secretary of State for Air, which he remained until October 1960. He was sworn of the Privy Council in 1957 and raised to the peerage as Viscount Ward of Witley, of Great Witley in the County of Worcester, in 1960.

== Family ==
Lord Ward of Whitley married firstly Anne Diana France Aysham Capel, daughter of Boy Capel, in 1940. They had two children: the Hon. Georgina Anne Ward (13 March 1941 – June 2010), an actress of stage and screen, and the Hon. Anthony Giles Humble Ward (10 June 1943 – 4 May 1983), but were divorced in 1951. He married secondly Barbara Mary Colonsay McNeill, daughter of Ronald Frank Rous McNeill and former wife of Michael Astor, in 1962. She died in 1980. Lord Ward of Witley died in June 1988, aged 80. His only son had predeceased him without issue, and as a result his title became extinct on his death.

== Arms ==
Coat of arms of George Ward, 1st Viscount Ward of Witley
Crest Out of a ducal coronet Or a lion's head Azure. Escutcheon Chequy Or and Azure a bend Ermine. Supporters On either side the figure of an angel Proper crined and winged Or vested Azure each holding in the exterior hand by the chains a portcullis Gold. Motto Comme Je Fus

Parliament of the United Kingdom
Preceded by Crawford Greene	Member of Parliament for Worcester; 1945–1960	Succeeded by Peter Walker
Political offices
Preceded by Nigel Birch	Under-Secretary of State for Air; 1952–1955	Succeeded by Christopher Soames
Preceded by Allan Noble	Parliamentary and Financial; Secretary to the Admiralty; 1955–1957	Succeeded by Christopher Soames
Preceded by Nigel Birch	Secretary of State for Air; 1957–1960	Succeeded by Julian Amery
Peerage of the United Kingdom
New creation	Viscount Ward of Witley; 1960 – 1988	Extinct
