= William Collins (Roundhead) =

English politician

William Collins was an English politician who sat in the House of Commons from 1654 to 1659. He supported the Parliamentary cause in the English Civil War.

== Biography ==
Collins was probably the son of John Collins of King's Norton, who was fined £10 for not taking knighthood on 4 March 1631. In the Civil War, Collins became a captain in the Parliamentary army. On 11 May 1644, he was added to the Committee for Worcestershire by the House of Commons. He became a sub-commissioner of the Grand Excise for Worcestershire on 25 February 1650. On 7 October 1651 the Committee for Compounding made an order that he be a commissioner for Worcestershire after a request on 1 October by Nicholas Lechmere that Capt Wm. Collins may be added to the Committee while Col. John James was not attending. On 14 March 1654 he was made sole sub-commissioner for Worcestershire.

In 1654, Collins was elected Member of Parliament for Worcester in the First Protectorate Parliament. He was an Assessment Commissioner for county and city of Worcester in 1656. In 1656 he was re-elected MP for Worcester in the Second Protectorate Parliament. He was re-elected MP for Worcester in 1659 for the Third Protectorate Parliament. He was Governor of Worcester on 9 July 1659 when the Council of State ordered him to assemble his troops in response to Sir George Booth's rising. On 4 January 1660 Capt. Collins wrote from Worcester College to the Army Commissioners "I have given order for the speedy drawing of my troop together for their march according to your directions, but their necessities for want of pay are very great, having been on hard duty for eight weeks, to preserve the peace of this country, which was much disturbed by highway robbers, being considerable parties, and supposed to be of the old enemy, they riding in the posture of soldiers; for this time they have had no money but what I have borrowed, and lent them, besides three years arrears formerly due to them. I shall according to your orders, as soon as I possibly provide to march, give notice thereof to Col. Hacker."

Parliament of England
Preceded by Not represented in Barebones Parliament	Member of Parliament for Worcester; 1654–1659; With: Edward Elvines 1654; Edmund Giles1656; Thomas Street	Succeeded by Not represented in Restored Rump
