= John Haselock =

English politician

John Haselock was an English politician who sat in the House of Commons from 1626 to 1629.

Haselock was one of the two Chamberlains of Worcester in 1621 and Mayor of Worcester in 1623. In 1626, Haselock was elected Member of Parliament for Worcester. He was re-elected MP for Worcester in 1628 and sat until 1629 when King Charles decided to rule without parliament for eleven years. He was fined for not taking knighthood on 4 March 1631.

Parliament of England
Preceded by Walter Devereux; Henry Spelman	Member of Parliament for Worcester; 1626–1629; With: John Spelman; John Coucher	Parliament suspended until 1640
