= Edmund Giles =

English lawyer and politician

Edmund Giles was an English lawyer and politician who sat in the House of Commons in 1656.

Giles was a relation by marriage of Oliver Cromwell and was of White Ladie Aston. He was called to the bar. On 4 March 1631, he was fined £10 for not taking a knighthood at the coronation of Charles I and disclaimed bearing arms at the Visitation 1634. He was a Master in Chancery from 22 November 1655 to 2 June 1660. In 1656, Giles was elected Member of Parliament for Worcester for the Second Protectorate Parliament. He was also a commissioner for assessment for the county and city of Worcester in 1656.

Parliament of England
Preceded by William Collins; Edward Elvines	Member of Parliament for Worcester; 1656; With: William Collins	Succeeded by William Collins; Thomas Street
