= Walter Jones (MP for Worcester) =

English lawyer and politician

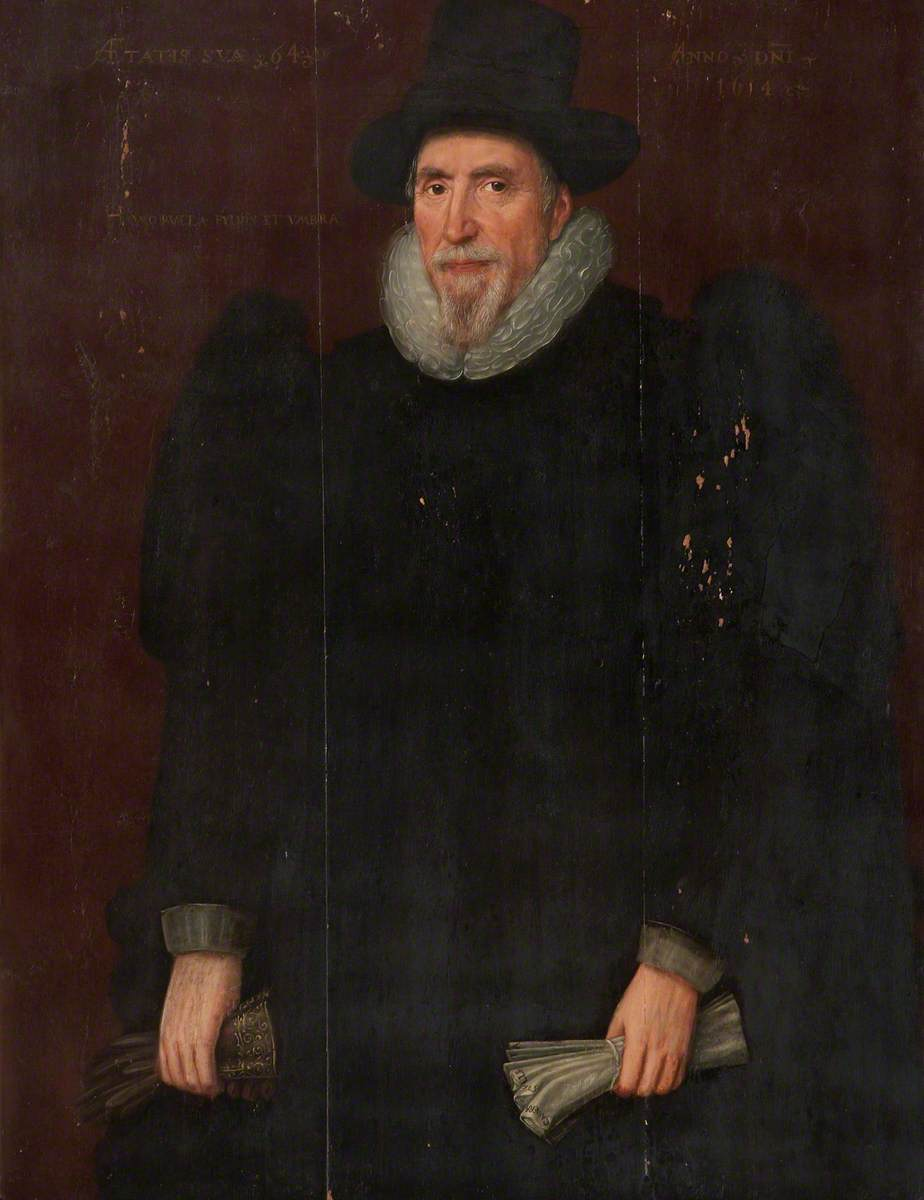
Portrait at Chastleton House, presumed to be Walter Jones

Walter Jones (c. 1550 – 1632) was an English lawyer and politician who served as Member of Parliament for Worcester.

== Biography ==
Jones was the son of Henry Jones of Witney, Oxfordshire, and his wife Ann. (Note: The History of Parliament gives Ann as daughter of Thomas Hill MP. This is incorrect according to Turner.) He entered Corpus Christi College, Oxford in 1567, graduating B.A. in 1570. He was admitted to Lincoln's Inn on 5 January 1572, and was called to the bar in November 1584.

He became town clerk of Worcester in 1583 (or possibly earlier) and, while serving as town clerk, was elected MP for Worcester in 1584, 1586, 1589, and 1593. He also served as a Justice of the peace in Worcestershire. In about 1593, he was appointed an attorney of the Court of Star Chamber in London.

In May 1602, Jones bought Chastleton House from Robert Catesby (who was in debt after being heavily fined for participation in Essex's Rebellion, and later led the Gunpowder Plot). Catesby was allowed to continue living at Chastleton. After Catesby was killed in the aftermath of the Gunpowder Plot, Jones – who had arrested some of Catesby's co-conspirators – took possession of Chastleton. He demolished and rebuilt the house entirely.

He was buried on 27 August 1632 in the church at Chastleton, Oxfordshire.

== Family ==
On 14 December 1573 at All Hallows-by-the-Tower, London, Jones married Helen, daughter of Henry Mekys alias Pope, a German-born London goldsmith. (Note: Their marriage settlement dated 2 November 1573 is held by Oxfordshire Record Office.) (Note: Turner refutes the claim made for instance by Marsden that Pope was Master of the Jewel House, a claim which has arisen from gradual distortion over time. She also refutes the claim that Pope was related to Sir Thomas Pope.) Their children included:

- Henry (c. 1582 – 1656)
  The Queen's College, Oxford 1598, Lincoln's Inn 1599; married Anne Fettiplace 1609, inherited Chastleton House
- John (1585 – before 1629)
  The Queen's College, Oxford 1602, Gray's Inn 1607; married Ann Dews, parents of Dr Walter Jones, Sub-Dean of the Chapel Royal
- Thomas (1586 – after 1629)
- Elizabeth (b. 1588)
  married George Greenwood 1607
- Elinore (b. 1589)
  married Ralph Holt
- Sarah (1590–1668)
  married William Bankes 1624, parents of William Bankes MP
- Gilbert (1592 – after 1629)
  Oriel College, Oxford 1612, B.A. 1614, M.A. 1617
- Walter (b. 1595)
