= Bryan Stanley =

British trade union leader (1926–2009)

Bryan Capewell Stanley (3 May 1926 –19 July 2009) was a British trade union leader.

Born in Walsall (on the first day of the General Strike), and educated at Queen Mary's Grammar School, Stanley left school at 14. He started work with the Post Office in 1942, and joined the Post Office Engineering Union (POEU) immediately.

Stanley stood for parliament in the 1956 Hereford by-election before fighting Worcester in the 1959 general election and a 1961 by-election, won by Peter Walker. His last parliamentary candidature was at Walsall South in the 1964 general election.

In 1959, he became a full-time organiser for the union, and in 1972, was elected as its General Secretary. In 1973, he was elected to the Labour Party's National Executive Committee. He stood down in 1978 to make way for John Golding, a Union-sponsored MP. In 1983, following a rule change at the TUC, providing automatic representation for unions with over 100,000 members, he became a member of the TUC General Council, where he remained until his retirement in 1986.

Although on the right of the Labour Party, Stanley declined an offer from Shirley Williams to defect to the Social Democratic Party, instead working to oppose the left within the party. In 1981, he convened the St Ermin's group of anti-militant trade union leaders, which aimed to co-ordinate their votes to win control of the Labour Party. He was not able to prevent the privatisation of British Telecom, and retired in 1986, but took up a post on the Industrial Tribunals panel. Just before his retirement, the POEU merged with the Postal and Telecommunications Group of the Civil and Public Services Association to form the National Communications Union, and Stanley served as its first General Secretary.

In 1990, Stanley was elected as a councillor in Hertsmere, and in 1996, he became leader of the council. He worked to purchase Elstree Studios for the borough, and was Mayor of Elstree and Borehamwood in 1997.

He was married with two children.

Trade union offices
Preceded by Charles Delacourt-Smith	General Secretary of the Post Office Engineering Union; 1972–1985	Succeeded by Position abolished
Preceded by New position	General Secretary of the National Communications Union; 1985–1986	Succeeded by John Golding
