= 1878 Worcester by-election =

UK Parliamentary by-election

The 1878 Worcester by-election was fought on 28 March 1878. The by-election was fought due to the death of the incumbent Liberal MP, Alexander Clunes Sheriff. It was won by the Conservative candidate John Derby Allcroft.

1878 Worcester by-election (1 seat)
Party	Candidate	Votes	%	±%
Conservative	John Derby Allcroft	2,609	54.8	+9.9
Liberal	Francis Lycett	2,155	45.2	−9.9
Majority		454	9.6	N/A
Turnout		4,764	75.7	+3.3
Registered electors		6,290		
Conservative gain from Liberal		Swing	+9.9	
