= Richard Robert Fairbairn =

Richard Robert James Fairbairn (27 May 1867 – 14 October 1941) was a British tramways and bus manager, Justice of the Peace and Liberal Party politician.

== Personal life and career ==
Richard Robert Fairbairn was the son of a London labour leader, probably Mr R R Fairbairn who was sometime President of the Amalgamated Society of Watermen, Lightermen and Bargemen. He was educated in Toronto, Canada and after becoming a manager of tramway and omnibus undertakings in London and Birmingham, he settled in Worcester to manage the Tramway Company there. He married and had six sons and three daughters. During the First World War, Fairbairn was Food Transport Officer for the Midlands and Midland Road Transport Officer. He later served as chairman of the Board of Commissioners for the River Severn.

== Political life ==
Fairbairn seems to have inherited his interest in politics from his father but the son worked in the Liberal interest. He served as Secretary of the Worcester Liberal Association, was a political agent and canvasser in the town and became a member of Worcester Council.

Fairbairn first stood for Parliament at the December 1910 general election, when he contested his home constituency of Worcester. He was successful in decreasing the Unionist's majority but failed to get elected.

In all, Fairbairn fought Worcester eight times for the Liberals. In 1918, the sitting Conservative MP was endorsed by the Coalition government and presumably received the Coalition Coupon, increasing his majority over Fairbairn. At the 1922 general election, however, Fairbairn achieved his only Parliamentary success. Although he faced a new Conservative candidate rather than the established MP of many years, Fairbairn managed to turn a Unionist majority of 4,554 into a Liberal majority of 773. His Conservative opponent, the Hon. Henry Lygon, a scion of a well-known Worcestershire family, had been seen as a strong candidate for his party but it was reported that the Tories had been overconfident and internally divided, and they seem to have paid the price.

In 1923, Fairbairn faced yet another new face for the Conservatives at Worcester, Australian-born Crawford Green. Despite the revival in the country that the Liberal Party achieved at this election, now re-united around the traditional Liberal policy of Free trade, Green won the seat by a majority of 1,228 votes.

Fairbairn was certainly persistent in his desire to represent Worcester again for the Liberals. He contested the seat again at the 1924, 1929, 1931 and 1935 general elections. He finished in second place to the Conservatives each time, except for 1929 when Labour overtook him; but never came close to regaining his seat.

== Death ==
Fairbairn died on 14 October 1941 while holding the office of Mayor of Worcester and having been granted the Freedom of the City in July that year. One academic has argued that by maintaining second position in the polls for the party in the face of any Labour challenge, Fairbairn ensured that Liberalism remained alive in Worcester at a time when the party was seen as increasingly irrelevant elsewhere.

Parliament of the United Kingdom
Preceded by Sir Edward Goulding	Member of Parliament for Worcester; 1922 – 1923	Succeeded by Crawford Greene
