= Samuel Fell =

English academic and clergyman (1584–1649)

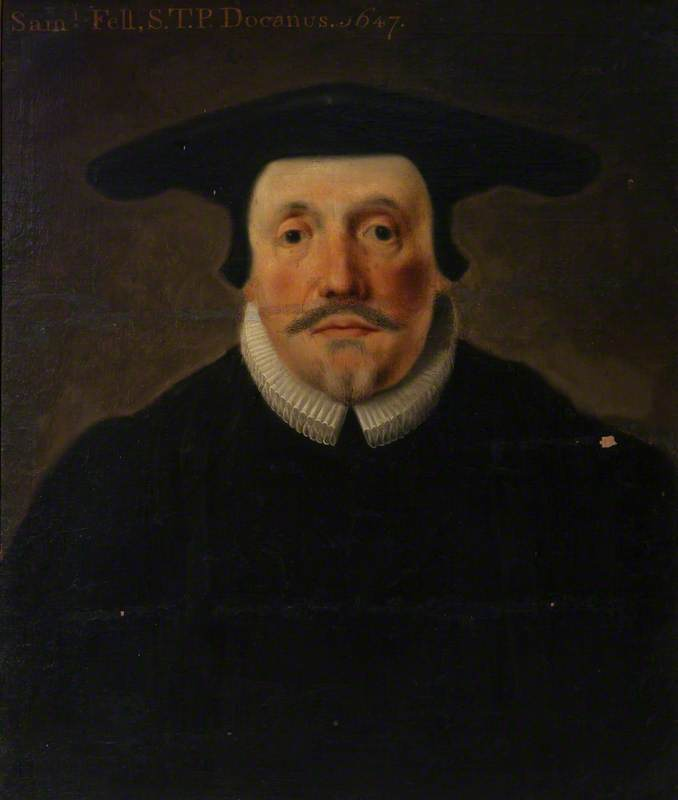
Samuel Fell

Samuel Fell D.D. (1584 – 1 February 1649) was an English academic and clergyman, Dean of Christ Church, Oxford and Vice-Chancellor of the University of Oxford during the First English Civil War.

== Life ==
Samuel Fell was born in the parish of St Clement Danes, London, and was educated at Westminster School. Thence he proceeded as a queen's scholar to Christ Church, Oxford, matriculating 20 November 1601, and graduated B.A. 27 June 1605, M.A. 30 May 1608, B.D. 23 November 1615, and D.D. 23 June 1619. He was elected proctor in 1614, and soon after became rector of Freshwater, Isle of Wight, and chaplain to King James I. It has been suggested that this position brought Robert Hooke to Oxford many years later, since at Freshwater Fell knew Hooke's father.

In May 1619, Fell was made a canon of Christ Church Cathedral, Oxford and in 1626 Lady Margaret Professor of Divinity, which he held, according to custom, with a canonry of Worcester Cathedral. These posts he held till 1637. At first his religious views were Calvinistic, but he changed his opinions and became an active ally of Archbishop William Laud. Laud promoted him, making Fell to the rector of Stow-on-the-Wold in 1637, Dean of Lichfield in January 1638, and Dean of Christ Church in June 1638. Fell continued with improvements in the cathedral and college projected by his predecessor, Brian Duppa, and added the staircase leading to the hall.

Active in Oxford University affairs, on 15 August 1637, Samuel Fell wrote to Laud about the excessive number of alehouses in Oxford, but on more than one occasion he was rebuked from Laud for setting his authority as head of a college in opposition to the proctors and other public officials of the university. On the outbreak of the Civil War he became a conspicuous royalist, and, after serving the office of vice-chancellor in 1645 and 1646, was reappointed in 1647. Soon after his reappointment the parliamentary visitors came to Oxford. In September, Fell was summoned before them; he declined to attend, was imprisoned, and on his release in November was deprived of all his offices in the university. He retired to the rectory of Sunningwell, near Abingdon, which he had held since 21 September 1625, and died there on 1 February 1649. He was buried in his church.

== Family ==
Samuel Fell married Margaret, daughter of Thomas Wylde, esq., of The Commandery Worcester, by whom he was the father of John Fell, Dean of Christ Church and Bishop of Oxford, and several daughters including Mary who married Thomas Willis.

== Sources ==
- This article incorporates text from a publication now in the public domain: Stephen, Leslie, ed. (1889). "Fell, Samuel". Dictionary of National Biography. Vol. 18. London: Smith, Elder & Co.

Academic offices
Preceded by Brian Duppa	Dean of Christ Church, Oxford; 1638–1648	Succeeded by Edward Reynolds
Preceded by Robert Pincke	Vice-Chancellor of Oxford University; 1645–1648	Succeeded by Edward Reynolds
