= John Nash (MP) =

John Nash (1590–1661) was an English merchant and politician who sat in the House of Commons between 1640 and 1648. He fought on the Parliamentary side in the English Civil War.

Nash was the son or brother of James Nash of Worcester. He was a wealthy clothier and alderman and was Mayor of Worcester in 1633. He was also a justice of the peace for the city.

In April 1640, Nash was elected member of parliament for Worcester in the Short Parliament. He was re-elected MP for Worcester for the Long Parliament in November 1640. During the Civil War, he commanded a troop of horse in the Parliamentary army. He was on the Assessment Committee for Worcestershire in 1644 and was excluded from parliament under Pride's Purge in 1648.

Nash died at the age of 72 and was buried at St Helen's Worcester where there is a monument. He founded the charity known as Nash's Hospital and left charitable legacies for apprentices and for helping young men set up businesses.

Parliament of England
| Vacant Parliament suspended since 1629 | Member of Parliament for Worcester; 1640; With: John Coucher | Not represented in Rump or Barebones parliaments |
