= Crawford Greene =

William Pomeroy Crawford Greene (28 June 1884 – 10 May 1959) was an Australian-born English Conservative Party politician.

== Early life ==
Greene was born on 28 June 1884 at his parents' home Iandra in Greenethorpe, Weddin Shire, New South Wales, Australia, the son of George Henry Greene and his wife Ellen.

Greene registered a coat of arms in 1908 with the Ulster King of Arms in Dublin. This coat of arms had been "borne and used by his family" for some time and can be described as on a blue shield three golden stags inside a gold border. Above the shield emerging from a gold coronet the head of a stag also gold, marked with a green shamrock on the neck. The Lain motto was "Nec timeo nec sperno" ("I neither fear nor despise").

== Politics ==
At the 1923 general election, he was elected as member of parliament (MP) for Worcester. He held the seat until he retired from politics at the 1945 election.

In 1933, he flew with Allen Bathurst, Lord Apsley from England to Australia.

== Later life ==
Greene died on 10 May 1959 in The London Clinic. His estate was valued at £142,402. He was buried with his parents and brother in their private cemetery at their home Iandra in Australia.

== Arms ==
Coat of arms of Crawford Greene
Notes Confirmed by Nevile Rodwell Wilkinson, Ulster King of Arms, 7 September 1908. Crest Out of a ducal coronet a buck's head Or charged with a shamrock Proper. Escutcheon Azure three bucks trippant Or a bordure of the last. Motto Nec Timeo Nec Sperno

Parliament of the United Kingdom
Preceded by Richard Fairbairn	Member of Parliament for Worcester; 1923 – 1945	Succeeded by George Ward
