= John Derby Allcroft =

English philanthropic entrepreneur, evangelical Anglican and politician

John Derby Allcroft (19 July 1822 – 29 July 1893) was an English philanthropic entrepreneur, evangelical Anglican and Conservative politician who sat in the House of Commons from 1878 to 1880.

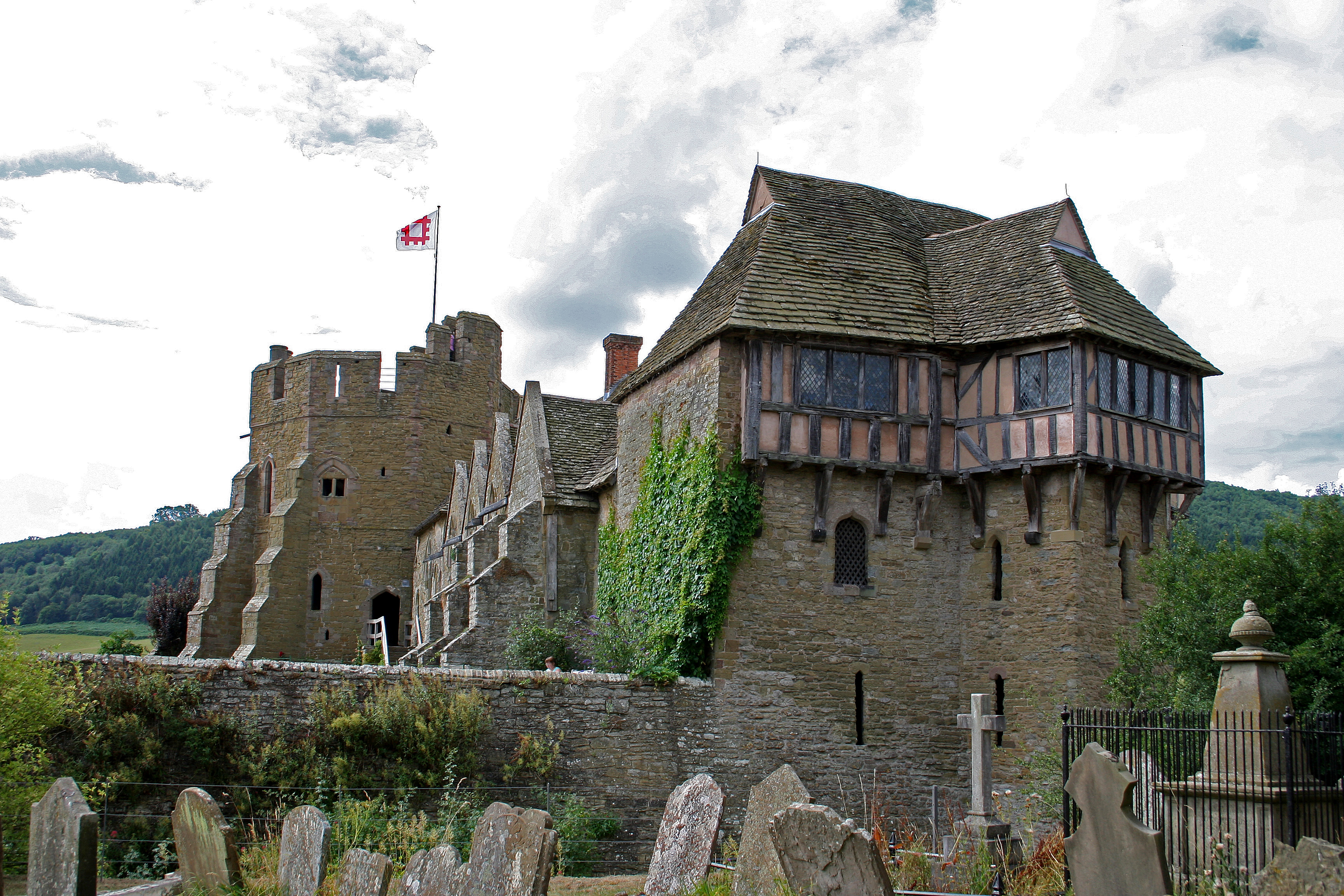
Stokesay Castle

== Early life ==
Allcroft was born on 19 July 1822, the only son of Jeremiah Macklin Allcroft, merchant of Worcester and his wife Hannah Derby, daughter of Thomas Derby and niece of William Derby. His father was in partnership with glovemakers J W Dent & Co in a very successful business.

== Career ==
Allcroft began work in his father's glove business which became Dent, Allcroft & Company. Under Allcroft, annual production quadrupled to over 12,000,000 pairs in 1884 and became the premier glove producer in the world. In 1867 he was able to buy the Stokesay Castle estate in Shropshire. In 1865, he was elected a Fellow of the Royal Astronomical Society but contributed no papers. He was a Commissioner of Lieutenancy for the City of London, Lord of the Manors of Onibury and Stokesay and patron of five livings. He was considered an eminent philanthropist, and was Treasurer and a Governor of Christ's Hospital. In 1874 he purchased a smaller estate, Stone House, Worcestershire. Allcroft was also Justice of the Peace for Shropshire.

== Public service ==
Allcroft stood unsuccessfully for parliament for Worcester in 1874. He was elected Member of Parliament for Worcester at a by-election in 1878 but lost the seat in the 1880 general election.

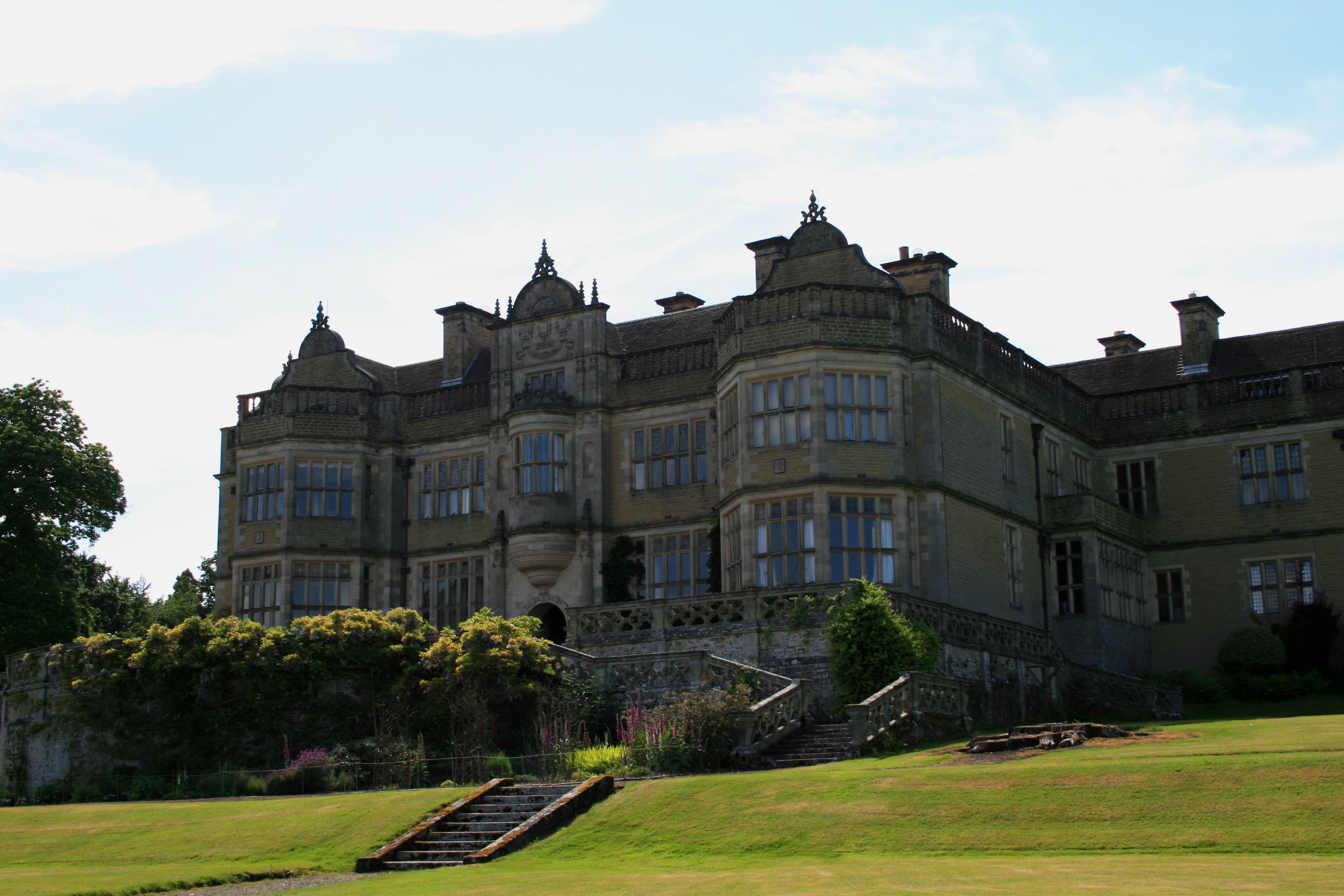
Stokesay Court

== Philanthropy ==
Allcroft built a number of London churches, including St Matthew's, Bayswater, St Jude's Church, Kensington and St Martin's Church, Gospel Oak. On 6 March 1878 he laid the foundation stone at St Simon's Church, Shepherd's Bush.

Allcroft also had a house near today's Heathrow called Harlington Lodge and was co-founder of the nearby Harlington, Harmondsworth and Cranford Cottage Hospital in 1884. In 1889 Allcroft was able to begin work on his planned Stokesay Court on the Stone House estate. It was completed in 1892, six months before his death at the age of 71.

== Family life ==
Allcroft married firstly in 1854 Mary Annette Martin, daughter of Rev. Thomas Martin, and secondly on 9 August 1864, Mary Blundell, daughter of John Blundell, of Timsbury Manor, Hampshire.

Parliament of the United Kingdom
Preceded by Alexander Clunes Sheriff; Thomas Rowley Hill	Member of Parliament for Worcester; 1878 – 1880; With: Thomas Rowley Hill	Succeeded by Aeneas John McIntyre; Thomas Rowley Hill
