= John Barrel =

English politician

John Barrel (fl. 1394–1404) was an English politician. He sat as MP for Worcester in 1394 and 1401.
