= Francis Lycett =

British businessman and philanthropist

Sir Francis Lycett
- Born: April 22, 1803; Worcester, United Kingdom
- Died: October 29, 1880 (aged 77)
- Occupations: Businessman and philanthropist
- Spouse: Amelia Sarah Emily Vanderpant (m. 1836)
- Children: 1

Sir Francis Lycett (22 April 1803 – 29 October 1880) was a British businessman and philanthropist, and a prominent member of the Wesleyan Methodist Church.

== Early life ==
Born in Worcester, he was the son of Philip Francis Lycett (c.1777- 2 May 1860) and his wife Mary nee Jenks (who died 26 September 1841). Following his education at a private school in Worcester, Francis initially entered employment in the family glove works.

== Career ==
In 1832, he became the manager of the London headquarters of Dent, Allcroft & Co., a large glove-making business located in Worcester. He was based in the City of London and became a member of the city's corporation.

In 1847, he became a partner in Dent, Allcroft & Co. As at 1 January 1855 there were three partners in the firm: Francis Lycett, John Derby Allcroft, and John Girvan, and the business had operations in Paris (5-7 Rue Hauteville) and Grenoble (Place Grenette) as well as London and Worcester. He retired from that business ("Dent, Allcroft, Lycett and Co.") in 1865. His two partners at that stage, John Derby Allcroft (1822-1893) and Thomas Mason (1813-1888), continued together in the business until Mason retired in December 1872, with Allcroft then taking over as the sole partner.

Although retired from glove-making in 1865, Lycett appears to have maintained some business interests. In 1872 he was the largest shareholder in The Mercantile Steam Ship Company Limited (registered in August 1871), holding 2,000 of the 13,000 eight-pounds-paid shares taken up in that company. One of this company`s ships was called the "Lady Lycett" (1833 gross tons, length 262.5 feet, launched 1872).

Francis Lycett continued his association with the City of London, in 1866 being elected as one of the two Sheriffs of London and Middlesex. He appointed George Thomas Perks (1819-1877) to be his chaplain. This was the first time a Methodist minister had been appointed chaplain to a Sheriff of London. He was knighted on 3 August 1867, became a justice of the peace for Middlesex and a Deputy Lieutenant for the City of London in 1869.

== Politics ==
A Liberal in politics, he stood five times unsuccessfully for election to the House of Commons: for Worcester in 1868; for Liskeard in May 1869 (losing by 285 to 368); for St Ives in December 1874 (losing 552 to 617); for St Ives again in March 1875 (after successfully petitioning against his opponent`s win in December 1874); and for Worcester in March 1878, losing to his former business partner John Derby Allcroft by 2155 to 2609. He had also been one of three Liberal candidates to nominate for the two-seat constituency of Southwark in January 1870, but withdrew his nomination following a Liberal Party arbitration process triggered by concern regarding the risk of three competing Liberal nominees splitting their party`s vote to the extent that one or both seats were won by opponents.

== Personal life ==
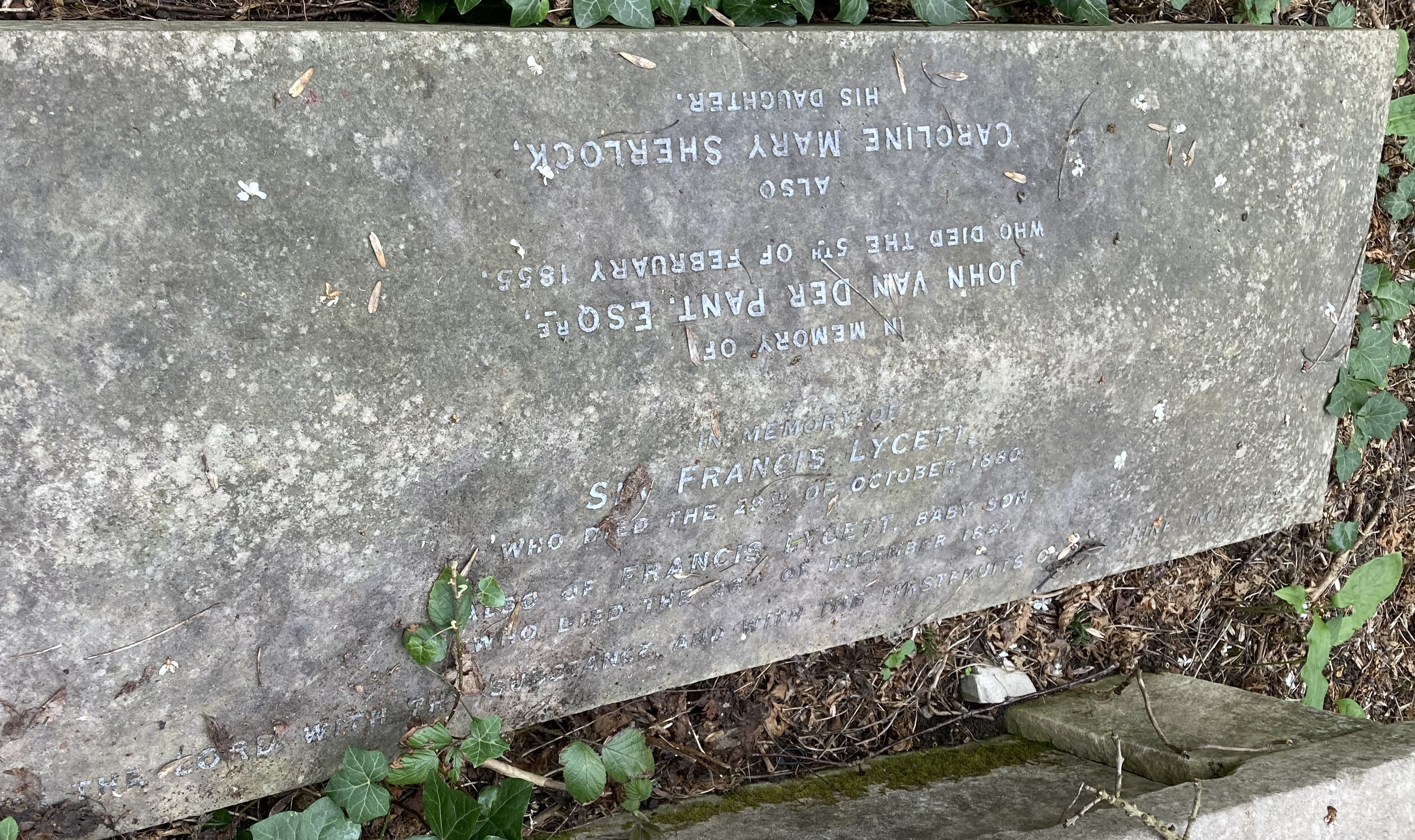
Family grave of Sir Francis Lycett in Highgate Cemetery

On 28 July 1836, he married (at Holy Trinity church, Islington) Amelia Sarah Emily Vanderpant, the youngest daughter of John Vanderpant of Utrecht in the Netherlands. The couple had only one child, Francis, who was 25 days old when he died in December 1842.

On 16 June 1869, Sir Francis Lycett laid the foundation stone of the Methodist church in the village of Wye in Kent.

In 1870, Sir Francis Lycett was elected to the first London School Board, as one of the members representing Finsbury. he was one of seven Wesleyans to be elected to that first London School Board.

Lycett died on 29 October 1880, at his home at 18 Highbury Grove, Islington, aged 77, and was buried on the western side of Highgate Cemetery. He left an estate of more than a quarter of a million pounds, much of which he willed to various Methodist charities.
