= List of mayors of Worcester =

The Mayor of Worcester is the civic head of Worcester City Council.

Every May one of the city Councillors is elected to serve as Mayor for a year. Another is elected as Deputy Mayor. The Mayor chairs meetings of the Full Council, represents the city at ceremonial occasions, welcomes international visitors and attends events organised by local people.

== List of mayors of Worcester ==
Notable previous mayors

- 1623: John Haselock
- 1631: Thomas Chettle
- 1633: John Nash
- 1635: George Street
- 1646: Edward Elvines
- 1656: Edmund Pitt
- 1667: Thomas Street
- 1709: Richard Lane
- 1720: Joseph Weston (wine merchant)
- 1819: Elias Isaac (banker)
- 1826: John Dent (Sheriff of Worcestershire, 1849)
- 1834: John Wheeley Lea (of Lea & Perrins)
- 1836-37 Christopher Henry Hebb
- 1837-38 George Allies
- 1838-39 Richard Evans
- 1839-40 Thomas Chalk
- 1840-41 C. Augustus Helm
- 1841-42 Edward Evans
- 1842-43 John Lilly
- 1843-44 William Lewis
- 1845-46 Edward Lloyd (died)
- 1846 W. Lewis (elected)
- 1846-47 Fredk. Thos. Elgie
- 1847-48 Edward Webb
- 1848-49 Richard Padmore Worcester's first non-conformist mayor, later a Liberal Party MP.
- 1849-50 John Wheeley Lea
- 1850-51 W. S. P. Hughes
- 1851-52 Thomas Lucy
- 1852-53 Richard Padmore
- 1853-54 Charles Bedford
- 1854-55-6 John Goodwin
- 1856-57 James Weaver
- 1857-58 Josiah Stallard
- 1858-59 Thomas Rowley Hill later Liberal MP for Worcestershire.
- 1859-60 William Haigh
- 1860-61 Joseph Wood
- 1861-62 Joseph Firkins
- 1862-63-4 Alexander Clunes Sheriff Chairman of Worcester Royal Porcelain Co. and later Liberal MP for Worcester.
- 1864-65 James Dyson Perrins
- 1865-66 Thomas Southall
- 1866-67 John Stallard
- 1867-68 William Webb
- 1868-69 Francis Woodward
- 1869-70 Richard E. Barnett
- 1870-71-2 Henry Willis
- 1872-73 Edward Wall (also Sheriff of Worcester)
- 1873-74 H. G. Goldingham
- 1874-75 John Longmore
- 1875-76 Francis Woodward
- 1876-77 Moses Jones
- 1877-78 Francis Dingle
- 1878-79 Walter Holland
- 1879-80 John Noake
- 1880-81 T. S. Townshend
- 1881-82 Lieut.-Col. Wm. Stallard
- 1882-83 Frederick Corbett
- 1883-84 W. B. Williamson
- 1884-85 Joseph S. Wood
- 1885-86 Ambrose Wm. Knott
- 1886-87 Walter Holland
- 1887-88 Herbert Caldicott
- 1888-89 Ernest Augustus Day, architect and surveyor.
- 1889-90 R. Smith-Carrington
- 1890-91 W. R. Higgs
- 1891-92 Walter Holland
- 1892-93 Alfred Percy Allsopp, M.P.
- 1893-94 Geo. H. Williamson
- 1894-95 Alfred Percy Allsopp, M.P.
- 1895-96 William Lygon, 7th Earl Beauchamp, later Governor of New South Wales
- 1896-97 Charles William Dyson Perrins (of Lea and Perrins)
- 1897-98 Albert Buck
- 1898-99 John Alfred Steward
- 1899-1900 John Millington
- 1900-1 John Alfred steward
- 1901-2 Walter Holland
- 1902-3 C. J. Whitehead (Conservative)
- 1903-4 John Samuel Cook
- 1904-5 Hubert A. Leicester
- 1909–10: Alfred Percy Allsopp (third term)
- 1916–19: Arthur Carlton
- 1922–23: Arthur Carlton
- 1941–42: Richard Robert Fairbairn (died in office, October 1941)
- 1958–59: Harold Alfred Richards
- 1985–86: Frank Poole

Recent mayors

- 1999–2000: Josephine Hodges
- 2000–01: Mary Drinkwater
- 2001–02: David Clark
- 2002–03: Robert Rowden
- 2003–04: Gareth Jones
- 2004–05: Allah Ditta
- 2005–06: Aubrey Tarbuck
- 2006–07: Ian Imray
- 2007–08: Stephen Inman
- 2008–09: Lucy Hodgson
- 2009–10: Andy Roberts
- 2010–11: Mike Layland
- 2011–12: Dr David Tibbutt
- 2012–13: Roger Berry
- 2013–14: Pat Agar
- 2014–15: Alan Amos
- 2015–16: Roger Knight
- 2016–17: Paul Denham
- 2017–18: Steve Mackay
- 2018–19: Jabba Riaz
- 2019–20: Allah Ditta
- 2020–21: Josephine Hodges
- 2021–22: Stephen Hodgson
- 2022–23: Adrian Gregson
- 2023–24: Louis Stephen
- 2024–25: Melanie Alcott
- 2025-26: Dr Matt Lamb
- 2026–27: Tor Pingree
