= John Malley =

English politician

John Malley was an English politician who sat as MP for Worcester in January 1404 and 1407.

Before November 1402, he was coroner of Worcester. He served as bailiff from Michaelmas 1405 till 1406.
