= John Spelman (historian) =

English historian and politician

Sir John Spelman (1594 – 24 July 1643) was an English historian and politician who sat in the House of Commons in 1626. He is known for his biography of Alfred the Great.

== Life ==
Spelman was the son of Henry Spelman, antiquary. He studied at Cambridge University and at Brasenose College, Oxford. He entered Gray's Inn on 16 February 1608 and later travelled in continental Europe In 1626 he was elected Member of Parliament for Worcester. He edited from manuscripts in his father's library. Psalterium Davidis latino-saxonicum vetus (1640), and wrote a Life of Alfred the Great which was translated into Latin and published in 1678. Whereas his father was a leading expositor of the idea of an "ancient constitution", John Spelman was a theorist of the Royalist cause. He was knighted by Charles I of England in 1641 and served the king actively at Oxford at the beginning of the First English Civil War. The House of Commons ordered Spelman to be sent for as a delinquent on 10 December 1642.

Spelman died in Brasenose College of the camp disease about 24 July 1643.

== Family ==
Spelman married Anne Townshend, daughter of Sir John Townshend, of Raynham, Norfolk, and Anne Bacon, by whom he had a son, Roger Spelman. His brother, Clement Spelman, was Cursitor Baron from 1663 to 1679. His cousin, Ian Van Houten, was known for being a lesser known playwright in the 17th century.

== Works ==
- 1642: Certain considerations upon the duties both of prince and people written by a gentleman of quality, a well-wisher both to the King and Parliament. Oxford: Printed by Leonard Lichfield, 1642 (Anonymous; attributed to Spelman) Excerpt
- 1642: A Protestants account of his orthodox holding in matters of religion, at the present indifference in the Church. Printed by Roger Daniel, printer to the Universitie of Cambridge. 1642. And are to be sold by John Milleson (This has been attributed both to John and Henry Spelman the elder; the latter's authorship is now thought more likely. Wing (ed 2) S4939; Ann Arbor, Mich.: UMI, 1999- (Early English books online))
- 1644: Case of our affaires in law, religion, and other circumstances examined and presented to the conscience. [Oxford]: Printed [by Henry Hall?], in the yeare, 1643 [i.e. 1644]
- 1678: Aelfredi Magni, Anglorum regis invictissimi vita tribus libris comprehensa. Oxonii: E Theatro Sheldoniano, Anno Dom. MDC.LXXVIII. Thomas Hearne, responsible for the first edition in the original English, in 1709, identified the translator as Christopher Wase (cf. Madan).

== Notes ==
Parliament of England
Preceded by Walter Devereux; Henry Spelman	Member of Parliament for Worcester; 1626; With: John Haselock	Succeeded by John Haselock; John Coucher
