= Edward Goulding, 1st Baron Wargrave =

British politician (1862–1936)

Goulding in 1895.

Edward Alfred Goulding, 1st Baron Wargrave PC JP DL (5 November 1862 – 17 July 1936), known as Sir Edward Goulding, Bt, between 1915 and 1922, was a British barrister, businessman and Conservative Party politician. He sat in the House of Commons between 1895 and 1922, before being ennobled and taking his seat in the House of Lords.

== Background and education ==
Goulding was the son of William Goulding by his second wife Maria Heath Manders, daughter of Edward Manders, of Dublin, Ireland. Sir William Goulding, 1st Baronet, was his elder brother. He was born in Ireland and educated at Clifton College and St John's College, Cambridge, and was called to the Bar, Inner Temple, in 1887.

== Political career ==
Goulding was elected at the 1895 general election as the Member of Parliament (MP) for the Devizes division of Wiltshire. He was re-elected in 1900, and held the seat until the 1906 general election, when he stood unsuccessfully in Finsbury Central.

He returned to Parliament two years later, when he was elected as MP for the borough of Worcester at by-election in February 1908, a seat which had been left vacant for two years after a Royal Commission concluded in 1906 that there had been extensive corruption in the borough at the 1906 general election. He was re-elected in Worcester at both the January and December 1910 elections, and was returned as a Coalition Unionist in 1918. He was created a Baronet, of Wargrave Hall in the County of Berks, in 1915 and sworn of the Privy Council in 1918. He stood down from the Commons at the 1922 general election, and was ennobled as Baron Wargrave, of Wargrave Hall in the County of Berks. Apart from his political career he was also chairman of Rolls-Royce Limited. He was Chairman of London Associated Electricity Undertakings Limited from 1935 to 1936.

== Personal life ==
Lord Wargrave lived at Wargrave Hall in Berkshire and the then Shiplake Court in Oxfordshire. He died childless in July 1936, aged 73. The baronetcy and barony died with him.

== Arms ==
Coat of arms of Edward Goulding, 1st Baron Wargrave
Crest A dexter hand apaumee and couped at the wrist encircled with a chaplet of oak fructed bendwise and transfixed with an arrow bendwise sinisterwise all Proper. Escutcheon Argent a griffin segreant within an orle of martlets Sable. Supporters On either side a swan Proper charged with a cross-flory Or. Motto Virtute Valorz (By Virtue And Valour)

Parliament of the United Kingdom
Preceded by Charles Hobhouse	Member of Parliament for Devizes; 1895 – 1906	Succeeded by Francis Rogers
Preceded by George Henry Williamson	Member of Parliament for Worcester; 1908 – 1922	Succeeded by Richard Robert Fairbairn
Preceded by Matthew Vaughan-Davies	Oldest Member of Parliament; 1921–1922	Succeeded by Henry Craik
Baronetage of the United Kingdom
New creation	Baronet (of Wargrave Hall); 1915 – 1936	Extinct
Peerage of the United Kingdom
New creation	Baron Wargrave; 1922 – 1936	Extinct
