= George Henry Williamson =

British manufacturer and politician

- Born: 14 January 1845
- Died: 24 March 1918 (aged 73)
- Occupations: manufacturer, politician
- Known for: member of British Parliament

George Henry Williamson (14 January 1845 – March 1918) was a British tinplate and sheet metal manufacturer, and Conservative Party politician.

He was elected at the general election in January 1906 as the member of parliament (MP) for the borough of Worcester. However, an election petition was lodged, and Williamson's election was declared void on 25 May 1906. The writ of election was suspended and a Royal Commission was established. Their report was published in December, concluding that there had been extensive corruption. New writs were proposed unsuccessfully on 17 December 1906 and 14 February 1907, and the writ was not finally moved until 31 January 1908.

Williamson did not stand for Parliament again.

Parliament of the United Kingdom
Preceded by George Allsopp	Member of Parliament for Worcester; January 1906 – May 1906	Succeeded by Edward Goulding
