= Worcester (UK Parliament constituency) =

Parliamentary constituency in the United Kingdom, 1885 onwards

Coordinates: 52.20°N 2.20°W

- Borough constituency for the House of Commons
- Boundaries since 1997
- Boundary of Worcester in West Midlands region
- County: Worcestershire
- Electorate: 73,960 (December 2010)

Current constituency
- Created: 1295
- Member of Parliament: Tom Collins (Labour)
- Seats: 1885–present: One; 1295–1885: Two

Worcester is a borough constituency represented in the House of Commons of the Parliament of the United Kingdom. Since 1885 it has elected one Member of Parliament (MP) by the first past the post system of election; from 1295 to 1885 it elected two MPs.

== Boundaries ==
1918–1950: The County Borough of Worcester.

1950–1983: The County Borough of Worcester, the Borough of Droitwich, and the Rural District of Droitwich.

1983–1997: The City of Worcester, and the District of Wychavon wards of Drakes Broughton, Inkberrow, Lenches, Pinvin, Spetchley, and Upton Snodsbury.

1997–present: The City of Worcester.

The 2023 Periodic Review of Westminster constituencies left the boundaries unchanged.

The constituency covers the city of Worcester, with (since the 1997 redistribution) exactly the same boundaries as the city. It borders the Mid Worcestershire constituency to the east, and West Worcestershire to the west.

== History ==
A safe Conservative seat for many years (the Conservatives even narrowly held the seat in the 1945 Labour landslide), Worcester was represented by the high-profile Conservative cabinet minister Peter Walker for three decades, from a by-election in 1961 until he stood down in 1992. Peter Luff held the seat for the Conservatives until 1997, when he moved to the redrawn Mid Worcestershire constituency.

Mike Foster of the Labour Party gained the seat at the 1997 general election. This can be put down to a combination of Labour's landslide victory nationally, but also to the fact that boundary changes meant the constituency was now solely an urban area, rather than also containing much of the surrounding countryside.

Peter Walker's son, Robin Walker, was elected as the Conservative MP at the 2010 general election. The constituency is marginal and was selected as a "target" by the Labour Party in 1997, and by the Conservative Party in 2010. Robin Walker announced in March 2023 that he would not seek reelection and stood down from parliament at the dissolution in advance of the 2024 United Kingdom general election, when it was gained by Labour's Tom Collins.

Many political commentators and journalists look on Worcester as having the demographic statistics which most closely mirror those in the United Kingdom as a whole. As such the term "Worcester woman" has come into use as a description for a typical swing voter.

== Members of Parliament ==
- Constituency created in 1295

Parliament	First member	Second member
1386	Richard Maisemore	Robert Stevens
1388 (February)	Roger Lichfield	John Bredon
1388 (September)	John Cole	John Somery
1390 (January)	Roger Lichfield	Thomas Belne
1390 (November)	Richard Maisemore	John Bredon
1391	Thomas Belne	Richard Maisemore
1393	Thomas Belne	John Hereford
1394	Thomas Belne	John Barrel
1395	Thomas Belne	John Cooper
1397 (January)	Thomas Belne	John Bredon
1397 (September)		
1399	Thomas Belne	John Bredon
1401	John Barrel	Richard Halle
1402	Thomas Belne	John Bredon
1404 (January)	Richard Halle	John Malley
1404 (October)		
1406	Richard Halle	Richard Oseney
1407	Thomas Belne	John Malley
1410	John Weston	Thomas Belne
1411		
1413 (February)		
1413 (May)	John Weston	John Wood
1414 (April)		
1414 (November)	John Weston	Richard Norton
1415	John Wood	John Weston
1416 (March)	John Wood	Ralph Merston
1416 (October)
1417	John Boyle	Geoffrey Friar
1419	John Weston	William Boughton
1420	John Forthey	William Ward
1421 (May)	John Forthey	Robert Nelme
1421 (December)	John Forthey	Geoffrey Friar
1510-1523	No names known	
1529	Hugh Dee, died and replaced after 1530 by ?Thomas Hill	John Braughing
1536	Thomas Hill	?
1539	?	
1542	John Braughing	Thomas Sheldon
1545	Richard Calowhill	Thomas Sheldon
1547	John Braughing died and replaced by January 1552 by Thomas Wylde	Robert Youle
1553 (March)	William Robinson	Edward Brogden
1553 (October)	Sir John Bourne	John Emery
1554 (April)	John Ainsworth	Thomas Hill
1554 (November)	Robert Youle	Edward Brogden
1555	Robert Youle	William Adyes
1558	Robert Youle	Thomas Wylde
1559	Richard Bullingham	Guthlac Edwards
1562–63	William Gibbes	John More
1571	Francis Streate	Richard Bullingham
1572	Christopher Deighton	Thomas Walsgrove alias Fleet
1584	Richard Nash	Walter Jones
1586	Ralph Wyat	Walter Jones
1588	Walter Jones	John Walsgrove alias Fleet
1593	Walter Jones	Rowland Berkeley
1597	Rowland Berkeley	William Bagnall
1601	Rowland Berkeley	Christopher Deighton
1604	John Coucher	Christopher Deighton, died and replaced 1605 by Rowland Berkeley
1614	John Coucher	Thomas Chettle
1621	John Coucher	Robert Berkeley
1624	John Coucher	Robert Berkeley
1625	Walter Devereux	Henry Spelman
1626	John Spelman	John Haselock
1628	John Coucher	John Haselock
1640 (April)	John Coucher	John Nash
1640 (November)	John Coucher	John Nash, secluded 1648
1654	William Collins	Edward Elvines (Alderman)
1656	William Collins	Edmund Giles
1659	William Collins	Thomas Street

=== MPs 1660–1885 ===
Election	First member	Party	Second member	Party
1660	Thomas Street		Thomas Hall	
1661	Thomas Street		Sir Rowland Berkeley	
1679	Thomas Street		Sir Francis Winnington	
1681	Henry Herbert, later Baron Herbert		Sir Francis Winnington	
1685	William Bromley		Bridges Nanfan	
1689	William Bromley		Sir John Somers	
1693 by-election	William Bromley		Samuel Swift	
1694 petition	William Bromley		Charles Cocks	
1695	William Bromley		Samuel Swift	
1701	Thomas Wylde		Samuel Swift	
1718 by-election	Thomas Wylde		Samuel Sandys, later Baron Sandys	
1727	Sir Richard Lane		Samuel Sandys, later Baron Sandys	
1734	Richard Lockwood		Samuel Sandys, later Baron Sandys	
1741	Thomas Winnington		Samuel Sandys, later Baron Sandys	
1744 by-election	Thomas Winnington		Sir Henry Harpur	
1746 by-election	Thomas Vernon		Sir Henry Harpur	
1747	Thomas Vernon		Thomas Geers Winford (Note: The election of Thomas Geers Winford in 1747 was overturned on petition, and Robert Tracy was declared elected in his place.)	
1748	Thomas Vernon		Robert Tracy	
1754	Thomas Vernon		Henry Crabb-Boulton	
1761	John Walsh		Henry Crabb-Boulton	
1773 by-election	John Walsh		Thomas Bates Rous	Tory
1774, March by-election	John Walsh		Nicholas Lechmere	Tory
1774, October	John Walsh		Thomas Bates Rous	Tory
1780	William Ward, later Viscount Dudley		Thomas Bates Rous	Tory
1784	William Ward, later Viscount Dudley		Samuel Smith	
1789 by-election	Edmund Wigley		Samuel Smith	
1790	Edmund Wigley		Edmund Lechmere	
1796	Edmund Wigley	Tory	Abraham Robarts	Whig
1802	Joseph Scott	Whig	Abraham Robarts	Whig
1806	Henry Bromley	Whig	Abraham Robarts	Whig
1807 by-election	William Gordon	Tory	Abraham Robarts	Whig
1816 by-election	William Gordon	Tory	Viscount Deerhurst	Tory
1818	Thomas Henry Hastings Davies	Whig	Viscount Deerhurst	Tory
1826	Thomas Henry Hastings Davies	Whig	George Richard Robinson	Whig
1835	Joseph Bailey	Conservative	George Richard Robinson	Whig
1837	Joseph Bailey	Conservative	Thomas Henry Hastings Davies	Whig
1841	Joseph Bailey	Conservative	Sir Thomas Wilde	Whig
1846 by-election	Joseph Bailey	Conservative	Sir Denis Le Marchant, Bt	Whig
1847	Osman Ricardo	Whig	Francis Rufford	Conservative
1852	Osman Ricardo	Whig	William Laslett	Radical
1859	Osman Ricardo	Liberal	William Laslett	Liberal
1860 by-election	Osman Ricardo	Liberal	Richard Padmore	Liberal
1865	Alexander Clunes Sheriff	Liberal	Richard Padmore	Liberal
1868	Alexander Clunes Sheriff	Liberal	William Laslett	Conservative
1874	Alexander Clunes Sheriff	Liberal	Thomas Rowley Hill	Liberal
1878 by-election	John Derby Allcroft	Conservative	Thomas Rowley Hill	Liberal
1880	Aeneas John McIntyre	Liberal	Thomas Rowley Hill	Liberal
1885	Representation reduced to one member			

=== MPs since 1885 ===
Election	Member	Party	Notes
1885	George Allsopp	Conservative	Brewer, of Samuel Allsopp & Sons
1906	George Henry Williamson	Conservative	Election overturned on petition in 1906, writ suspended until 1908
1908 by-election	Edward Goulding	Conservative	Made a baronet in 1915, later ennobled as Baron Wargrave
1922	Richard Robert Fairbairn	Liberal	contested the seat 8 times, but won only once
1923	Crawford Greene	Conservative	
1945	George Ward	Conservative	Ennobled in 1960 as Viscount Ward of Witley
1961 by-election	Peter Walker	Conservative	Cabinet minister 1970–1974, 1979–1990
1992	Peter Luff	Conservative	MP for Mid Worcestershire 1997–2015
1997	Mike Foster	Labour	Under-Secretary of State for International Development 2008–2010
2010	Robin Walker	Conservative	son of Peter Walker, MP for Worcester 1961–1992
2024	Tom Collins	Labour	

== Elections ==
=== Elections in the 2020s ===
General election 2024: Worcester
Party	Candidate	Votes	%	±%
Labour	Tom Collins	18,622	40.5	▲3.0
Conservative	Marc Bayliss	11,506	25.0	▼25.8
Reform	Andy Peplow	6,723	14.6	new
Green	Tor Pingree	4,789	10.4	▲7.1
Liberal Democrats	Mel Allcott	3,986	8.7	▲1.5
TUSC	Mark Davies	280	0.6	new
SDP	Duncan Murray	130	0.3	new
Majority		7,116	15.5	new
Turnout		46,036	61.4	▼7.4
Labour gain from Conservative		Swing	▲14.4	

=== Elections in the 2010s ===
General election 2019: Worcester
Party	Candidate	Votes	%	±%
Conservative	Robin Walker	25,856	50.8	+2.7
Labour	Lynn Denham	19,098	37.5	−5.7
Liberal Democrats	Stephen Kearney	3,666	7.2	+3.8
Green	Louis Stephen	1,694	3.3	+0.9
Independent	Martin Potter	584	1.1	New
Majority		6,758	13.3	+8.4
Turnout		50,898	69.3	−1.3
Conservative hold		Swing	+4.2	

General election 2017: Worcester
Party	Candidate	Votes	%	±%
Conservative	Robin Walker	24,731	48.1	+2.8
Labour	Joy Squires	22,223	43.2	+9.2
Liberal Democrats	Stephen Kearney	1,757	3.4	0.0
UKIP	Paul Hickling	1,354	2.6	−10.2
Green	Louis Stephen	1,211	2.4	−1.7
Independent	Alex Rugg	109	0.2	New
Compass Party	Mark Shuker	38	0.1	New
Majority		2,508	4.9	−6.4
Turnout		51,529	70.6	+0.6
Conservative hold		Swing	−3.3	

General election 2015: Worcester
Party	Candidate	Votes	%	±%
Conservative	Robin Walker	22,534	45.3	+5.8
Labour	Joy Squires	16,888	34.0	+0.6
UKIP	James Goad	6,378	12.8	+10.0
Green	Louis Stephen	2,024	4.1	+2.6
Liberal Democrats	Federica Smith	1,677	3.4	−16.0
TUSC	Pete McNally	153	0.3	New
Independent	Mark Shuker	69	0.1	New
Majority		5,646	11.3	+5.2
Turnout		49,723	70.0	+2.8
Conservative hold		Swing	+3.2	

General election 2010: Worcester
Party	Candidate	Votes	%	±%
Conservative	Robin Walker	19,358	39.5	+4.4
Labour	Mike Foster	16,376	33.4	−8.5
Liberal Democrats	Jackie Alderson	9,525	19.4	+3.1
UKIP	Jack Bennett	1,360	2.8	+0.4
BNP	Spencer Kirby	1,219	2.5	+0.4
Green	Louis Stephen	735	1.5	−0.5
Pirate	Andrew Robinson	173	0.3	New
Independent	Peter Nielsen	129	0.2	New
Independent	Andrew Christian-Brookes	99	0.2	New
Majority		2,982	6.1	N/A
Turnout		48,974	67.2	+3.1
Conservative gain from Labour		Swing	+6.4	

=== Elections in the 2000s ===
General election 2005: Worcester
Party	Candidate	Votes	%	±%
Labour	Mike Foster	19,421	41.9	−6.7
Conservative	Margaret Harper	16,277	35.1	−0.4
Liberal Democrats	Mary Dhonau	7,557	16.3	+3.7
UKIP	Richard Chamings	1,113	2.4	−0.9
BNP	Martin Roberts	980	2.1	New
Green	Chris Lennard	921	2.0	New
Independent	Prudence Dowson	119	0.3	New
Majority		3,144	6.8	−6.3
Turnout		46,388	64.1	+2.1
Labour hold		Swing	−3.2	

General election 2001: Worcester
Party	Candidate	Votes	%	±%
Labour	Mike Foster	21,478	48.6	−1.5
Conservative	Richard Adams	15,712	35.5	−0.2
Liberal Democrats	Paul Chandler	5,578	12.6	+0.1
UKIP	Richard Chamings	1,442	3.3	+1.6
Majority		5,766	13.1	−1.3
Turnout		44,210	62.0	−12.6
Labour hold		Swing	−0.7	

=== Elections in the 1990s ===
General election 1997: Worcester
Party	Candidate	Votes	%	±%
Labour	Mike Foster	25,848	50.1	+13.9
Conservative	Nick Bourne	18,423	35.7	−10.7
Liberal Democrats	Paul Chandler	6,462	12.5	−3.4
UKIP	P. Wood	886	1.7	New
Majority		7,452	14.4	N/A
Turnout		51,619	74.6	−6.7
Labour gain from Conservative		Swing	+12.3	

General election 1992: Worcester
Party	Candidate	Votes	%	±%
Conservative	Peter Luff	27,883	46.4	−1.8
Labour	Roger Berry	21,731	36.2	+7.8
Liberal Democrats	John Caiger	9,561	15.9	−7.5
Green	Mike Foster	592	1.0	New
Independent	Martin Soden	343	0.6	New
Majority		6,152	10.2	−9.6
Turnout		60,110	81.0	+4.3
Conservative hold		Swing	−4.8	

=== Elections in the 1980s ===
General election 1987: Worcester
Party	Candidate	Votes	%	±%
Conservative	Peter Walker	25,504	48.2	−1.3
Labour	Michael Webb	15,051	28.4	+5.7
SDP	John Caiger	12,386	23.4	−4.0
Majority		10,453	19.8	−2.3
Turnout		52,941	76.7	+2.6
Conservative hold		Swing	−3.5	

General election 1983: Worcester
Party	Candidate	Votes	%	±%
Conservative	Peter Walker	24,381	49.5	−1.8
SDP	Colin Phipps	13,510	27.4	+12.3
Labour	John Rudd	11,208	22.7	−8.9
BNP	K.A. Axon	208	0.4	New
Majority		10,871	22.1	+2.4
Turnout		49,307	74.1	−1.3
Conservative hold		Swing		

=== Elections in the 1970s ===
General election 1979: Worcester
Party	Candidate	Votes	%	±%
Conservative	Peter Walker	30,194	51.31	+5.74
Labour	D. Sparks	18,605	31.62	−4.92
Liberal	D. Elliott	8,886	15.10	−2.79
Ecology	J. Davenport	707	1.20	New
National Front	K. Stevens	450	0.76	New
Majority		11,589	19.69	+10.66
Turnout		58,842	75.41	+1.57
Conservative hold		Swing		

General election October 1974: Worcester
Party	Candidate	Votes	%	±%
Conservative	Peter Walker	25,183	45.57	
Labour	W.B. Morgan	20,194	36.54	
Liberal	D. Elliott	9,888	17.89	
Majority		4,989	9.03	
Turnout		55,265	73.84	
Conservative hold		Swing		

General election February 1974: Worcester
Party	Candidate	Votes	%	±%
Conservative	Peter Walker	27,377	45.62	
Labour	W.B. Morgan	19,910	33.18	
Liberal	D.S. Smith	12,724	21.20	New
Majority		7,467	12.44	
Turnout		60,011	80.95	
Conservative hold		Swing		

General election 1970: Worcester
Party	Candidate	Votes	%	±%
Conservative	Peter Walker	29,717	58.28	
Labour	Peter Jones	21,275	41.72	
Majority		8,442	16.56	
Turnout		50,992	72.84	
Conservative hold		Swing		

=== Elections in the 1960s ===
General election 1966: Worcester
Party	Candidate	Votes	%	±%
Conservative	Peter Walker	25,398	53.52	
Labour	Frank Barrington-Ward	22,057	46.48	
Majority		3,341	7.04	
Turnout		47,455	77.89	
Conservative hold		Swing		

General election 1964: Worcester
Party	Candidate	Votes	%	±%
Conservative	Peter Walker	24,345	50.90	
Labour	John Martin	17,038	35.62	
Liberal	John G. Parry	6,448	13.48	New
Majority		7,307	15.28	
Turnout		47,831	79.34	
Conservative hold		Swing		

1961 Worcester by-election
Party	Candidate	Votes	%	±%
Conservative	Peter Walker	15,087	39.7	−18.0
Labour	Bryan Stanley	11,490	30.2	−12.1
Liberal	Robert Glenton	11,435	30.1	New
Majority		3,597	9.5	−5.8
Turnout		38,012	64.2	−15.1
Conservative hold		Swing	−3.0	

=== Elections in the 1950s ===
General election 1959: Worcester
Party	Candidate	Votes	%	±%
Conservative	George Ward	27,024	57.67	
Labour	Bryan Stanley	19,832	42.33	
Majority		7,192	15.34	
Turnout		46,856	79.26	
Conservative hold		Swing		

General election 1955: Worcester
Party	Candidate	Votes	%	±%
Conservative	George Ward	25,610	56.76	
Labour	Leonard V Pike	19,508	43.24	
Majority		6,102	13.52	
Turnout		45,118	77.77	
Conservative hold		Swing		

General election 1951: Worcester
Party	Candidate	Votes	%	±%
Conservative	George Ward	26,060	55.48	
Labour	Leonard V Pike	20,909	44.52	
Majority		5,151	10.96	
Turnout		46,969	82.13	
Conservative hold		Swing		

General election 1950: Worcester
Party	Candidate	Votes	%	±%
Conservative	George Ward	24,147	49.54	
Labour Co-op	J. Evans	19,807	40.64	
Liberal	William Henry P. Gardiner	4,786	9.82	
Majority		4,340	8.90	
Turnout		48,740	86.08	
Registered electors		56,622		
Conservative hold		Swing		

=== Elections in the 1940s ===
General election 1945: Worcester
Party	Candidate	Votes	%	±%
Conservative	George Ward	13,523	42.93	
Labour Co-op	J. Evans	13,519	42.92	
Liberal	Ronald James Bowker	4,459	14.16	
Majority		4	0.01	
Turnout		31,501	75.86	
Conservative hold		Swing		

=== Elections in the 1930s ===
General Election 1939–40: Another general election was required to take place before the end of 1940. The political parties had been making preparations for an election to take place from 1939 and by the end of this year, the following candidates had been selected;

- Conservative: Crawford Greene
- Liberal: Richard Fairbairn
- Labour: James Ferguson

General election 1935: Worcester
Party	Candidate	Votes	%	±%
Conservative	Crawford Greene	13,398	50.68	
Liberal	Richard Fairbairn	6,885	26.05	
Labour	James Ferguson	6,152	23.27	
Majority		6,513	24.63	
Turnout		26,435	76.75	
Conservative hold		Swing		

General election 1931: Worcester
Party	Candidate	Votes	%	±%
Conservative	Crawford Greene	16,357	60.9	+13.7
Liberal	Richard Fairbairn	6,611	24.6	+1.1
Labour	Hubert Bolton	3,874	14.4	−14.9
Majority		9,746	36.3	+16.4
Turnout		26,842	79.7	+14.3
Conservative hold		Swing		

=== Elections in the 1920s ===
General election 1929: Worcester
Party	Candidate	Votes	%	±%
Unionist	Crawford Greene	13,182	47.2	−8.8
Labour	Kenneth Lindsay	8,208	29.3	+14.0
Liberal	Richard Fairbairn	6,588	23.5	−5.2
Majority		4,974	17.9	−9.4
Turnout		27,977	65.4	−18.0
Unionist hold		Swing	−11.4	

General election 1924: Worcester
Party	Candidate	Votes	%	±%
Unionist	Crawford Greene	11,956	56.0	+5.1
Liberal	Richard Fairbairn	6,139	28.7	−16.6
Labour	Percy Williams	3,272	15.3	+11.5
Majority		5,817	27.3	+21.7
Turnout		21,367	83.4	−2.4
Unionist hold		Swing		

General election 1923: Worcester
Party	Candidate	Votes	%	±%
Unionist	Crawford Greene	10,971	50.9	+2.9
Liberal	Richard Fairbairn	9,743	45.3	−6.7
Labour	Percy Williams	815	3.8	New
Majority		1,228	5.6	N/A
Turnout		21,529	85.8	+3.4
Unionist gain from Liberal		Swing	+4.8	

General election 1922: Worcester
Party	Candidate	Votes	%	±%
Liberal	Richard Fairbairn	10,143	52.0	+17.4
Unionist	Henry Lygon	9,370	48.0	−17.4
Majority		773	4.0	N/A
Turnout		19,513	82.4	+20.1
Liberal gain from Unionist		Swing	+17.4	

=== Elections in the 1910s ===
General election 1918: Worcester Electorate 22,667
Party		Candidate	Votes	%	±%
C	Unionist	Edward Goulding	9,243	65.4	+8.5
	Liberal	Richard Fairbairn	4,889	34.6	−8.5
Majority			4,364	30.8	+17.0
Turnout			14,132	62.3	−22.3
Registered electors			22,667		
	Unionist hold		Swing	+8.5	
C indicates candidate endorsed by the coalition government.

General election December 1910: Worcester
Party	Candidate	Votes	%	±%
Conservative	Edward Goulding	4,193	56.9	−0.4
Liberal	Richard Fairbairn	3,172	43.1	+0.4
Majority		1,021	13.8	−0.8
Turnout		7,365	84.6	−7.0
Registered electors		8,701		
Conservative hold		Swing	−0.4	

General election January 1910: Worcester
Party	Candidate	Votes	%	±%
Conservative	Edward Goulding	4,561	57.3	+6.5
Liberal	J. Morgan	3,405	42.7	−6.5
Majority		1,156	14.6	+13.0
Turnout		7,966	91.6	+0.9
Registered electors		8,701		
Conservative hold		Swing	+6.5	

=== Elections in the 1900s ===
1908 Worcester by-election
Party	Candidate	Votes	%	±%
Conservative	Edward Goulding	4,361	58.7	+7.9
Liberal	Harold Elverston	3,069	41.3	−7.9
Majority		1,292	17.4	+15.8
Turnout		7,430	87.8	−2.9
Registered electors		8,460		
Conservative hold		Swing	+7.9	

General election 1906: Worcester
Party	Candidate	Votes	%	±%
Conservative	George Henry Williamson	3,881	50.8	N/A
Liberal	Henry Devenish Harben	3,752	49.2	N/A
Majority		129	1.6	N/A
Turnout		7,633	90.7	N/A
Registered electors		8,412		
Conservative hold		Swing	N/A	

General election 1900: Worcester
Party	Candidate	Votes	%	±%
Conservative	George Allsopp	Unopposed		
Conservative hold				

=== Elections in the 1890s ===
General election 1895: Worcester
Party	Candidate	Votes	%	±%
Conservative	George Allsopp	3,530	60.3	+4.1
Liberal	James Thorpe Hincks	2,328	39.7	−2.8
Majority		1,202	20.6	+6.9
Turnout		5,858	76.9	−8.4
Registered electors		7,617		
Conservative hold		Swing	+2.8	

General election 1892: Worcester
Party	Candidate	Votes	%	±%
Conservative	George Allsopp	3,353	56.2	+4.9
Liberal	Esme William Howard	2,540	42.5	−6.2
Independent	Joseph Thomas Rushton	79	1.3	New
Majority		813	13.7	+11.1
Turnout		5,972	85.3	+1.3
Registered electors		6,999		
Conservative hold		Swing	+5.6	

=== Elections in the 1880s ===
General election 1886: Worcester (1 seat)
Party	Candidate	Votes	%	±%
Conservative	George Allsopp	2,892	51.3	+0.6
Liberal	Thomas Rowley Hill	2,749	48.7	−0.6
Majority		143	2.6	+1.2
Turnout		5,641	84.0	−3.3
Registered electors		6,714		
Conservative hold		Swing	+0.6	

General election 1885: Worcester (1 seat)
Party	Candidate	Votes	%	±%
Conservative	George Allsopp	2,974	50.7	+18.3
Liberal	Thomas Rowley Hill	2,890	49.3	−18.3
Majority		84	1.4	N/A
Turnout		5,864	87.3	+6.0 (est)
Registered electors		6,714		
Conservative gain from Liberal		Swing	+18.3	

General election 1880: Worcester (2 seats)
Party	Candidate	Votes	%	±%
Liberal	Thomas Rowley Hill	2,716	35.1	+8.3
Liberal	Æneas John McIntyre	2,511	32.5	+4.2
Conservative	John Derby Allcroft	2,502	32.4	−12.5
Majority		9	0.1	−6.0
Turnout		5,218 (est)	81.3 (est)	+8.9
Registered electors		6,422		
Liberal hold		Swing	+7.3	
Liberal hold		Swing	+5.2	

=== Elections in the 1870s ===
1878 Worcester by-election (1 seat)
Party	Candidate	Votes	%	±%
Conservative	John Derby Allcroft	2,609	54.8	+9.9
Liberal	Francis Lycett	2,155	45.2	−9.9
Majority		454	9.6	N/A
Turnout		4,764	75.7	+3.3
Registered electors		6,290		
Conservative gain from Liberal		Swing	+9.9	

- Caused by Sheriff's death.

General election 1874: Worcester (2 seats)
Party	Candidate	Votes	%	±%
Liberal	Alexander Clunes Sheriff	2,284	28.3	+0.3
Liberal	Thomas Rowley Hill	2,164	26.8	+5.2
Conservative	John Derby Allcroft	1,958	24.2	+7.6
Conservative	William Laslett	1,672	20.7	+4.1
Majority		492	6.1	N/A
Turnout		4,039 (est)	72.4 (est)	−16.0
Registered electors		5,578		
Liberal hold		Swing	−2.8	
Liberal gain from Conservative		Swing	−0.3	

=== Elections in the 1860s ===
General election 1868: Worcester (2 seats)
Party	Candidate	Votes	%	±%
Conservative	William Laslett	2,439	33.2	+3.3
Liberal	Alexander Clunes Sheriff	2,063	28.0	−10.4
Liberal	Thomas Rowley Hill	1,586	21.6	N/A
Liberal	Francis Lycett	1,269	17.2	N/A
Majority		853	11.6	N/A
Turnout		4,898 (est)	88.4 (est)	−3.5
Registered electors		5,542		
Conservative gain from Liberal		Swing	+6.9	
Liberal hold		Swing	−6.9	

General election 1865: Worcester (2 seats)
Party	Candidate	Votes	%	±%
Liberal	Alexander Clunes Sheriff	1,255	38.4	N/A
Liberal	Richard Padmore	1,033	31.6	N/A
Conservative	James Levick	978	29.9	N/A
Majority		55	1.7	N/A
Turnout		2,122 (est)	91.9 (est)	N/A
Registered electors		2,309		
Liberal hold		Swing	N/A	
Liberal hold		Swing	N/A	

By-election, 12 March 1860: Worcester
Party	Candidate	Votes	%	±%
Liberal	Richard Padmore	Unopposed		
Liberal hold				

- Caused by Laslett's resignation

=== Elections in the 1850s ===
General election 1859: Worcester (2 seats)
Party	Candidate	Votes	%	±%
Liberal	William Laslett	Unopposed		
Liberal	Osman Ricardo	Unopposed		
Registered electors		2,563		
Liberal hold				
Liberal hold				

General election 1857: Worcester (2 seats)
Party	Candidate	Votes	%	±%
Radical	William Laslett	1,137	41.3	+1.4
Whig	Osman Ricardo	1,003	36.4	−1.9
Peelite	Thomas Sidney	615	22.3	+0.5
Turnout		1,378 (est)	54.4 (est)	−26.3
Registered electors		2,530		
Majority		134	4.9	−13.2
Radical hold		Swing	+1.7	
Majority		388	14.1	−2.5
Whig hold		Swing	−1.7	

General election 1852: Worcester (2 seats)
Party	Candidate	Votes	%	±%
Radical	William Laslett	1,212	39.9	New
Whig	Osman Ricardo	1,164	38.3	−26.5
Conservative	John Walter Huddleston	661	21.8	−13.4
Turnout		1,849 (est)	80.7 (est)	+16.3
Registered electors		2,290		
Majority		551	18.1	N/A
Radical gain from Conservative		Swing		
Majority		503	16.5	+15.7
Whig hold		Swing	−6.6	

By-election, 28 April 1852: Worcester
Party	Candidate	Votes	%	±%
Radical	William Laslett	Unopposed		
Radical gain from Conservative				

- Caused by Rufford's resignation.

=== Elections of the 1840s ===
General election 1847: Worcester (2 seats)
Party	Candidate	Votes	%	±%
Whig	Osman Ricardo	1,168	36.0	−0.7
Conservative	Francis Rufford	1,141	35.2	−1.1
Whig	Robert Hardy	932	28.8	+1.8
Turnout		1,621 (est)	64.4 (est)	−5.2
Registered electors		2,518		
Majority		27	0.8	+0.4
Whig hold		Swing	−0.1	
Majority		209	6.4	−2.9
Conservative hold		Swing	−1.1	

By-election, 8 July 1846: Worcester
Party	Candidate	Votes	%	±%
Whig	Denis Le Marchant	Unopposed		
Whig hold				

- Caused by Wilde's appointment as Attorney General for England and Wales

General election 1841: Worcester (2 seats)
Party	Candidate	Votes	%	±%
Whig	Thomas Wilde	1,187	36.7	N/A
Conservative	Joseph Bailey	1,173	36.3	N/A
Whig	Robert Hardy	875	27.0	N/A
Turnout		2,114	69.6	N/A
Registered electors		3,307		
Majority		14	0.4	N/A
Whig hold		Swing	N/A	
Majority		298	9.3	N/A
Conservative hold		Swing	N/A	

=== Elections of the 1830s ===
General election 1837: Worcester (2 seats)
Party	Candidate	Votes	%
Whig	Thomas Henry Hastings Davies	Unopposed	
Conservative	Joseph Bailey	Unopposed	
Registered electors		3,238	
Whig hold			
Conservative hold			

General election 1835: Worcester (2 seats)
Party	Candidate	Votes	%
Whig	George Richard Robinson	1,611	41.3
Conservative	Joseph Bailey	1,154	29.6
Whig	Thomas Henry Hastings Davies	1,137	29.1
Turnout		2,217	92.4
Registered electors		2,400	
Majority		457	11.7
Whig hold			
Majority		17	0.5
Conservative gain from Whig			

General election 1832: Worcester (2 seats)
Party	Candidate	Votes	%
Whig	George Richard Robinson	Unopposed	
Whig	Thomas Henry Hastings Davies	Unopposed	
Registered electors		2,366	
Whig hold			
Whig hold			

General election 1831: Worcester (2 seats)
Party	Candidate	Votes	%
Whig	George Richard Robinson	Unopposed	
Whig	Thomas Henry Hastings Davies	Unopposed	
Registered electors		c. 3,000	
Whig hold			
Whig hold			

General election 1830: Worcester (2 seats)
Party	Candidate	Votes	%
Whig	George Richard Robinson	Unopposed	
Whig	Thomas Henry Hastings Davies	Unopposed	
Whig hold			
Whig hold			

== See also ==
- List of parliamentary constituencies in Herefordshire and Worcestershire
- List of parliamentary constituencies in West Midlands (region)
- Worcester woman
