= 1908 Worcester by-election =

UK Parliamentary by-election

A UK parliamentary by-election in the constituency of Worcester was held on 7 February 1908 and won by the Conservative candidate Edward Goulding.

== Vacancy ==
The election was held after the voiding of the election for Worcester at the 1906 UK general election of Conservative George Henry Williamson. The losing Liberal Party candidate, Henry Devenish Harben, lodged an election petition alleging corruption, and after a trial from 22 to 26 May, Sir John Compton Lawrance and Sir Joseph Walton adjudged Williamson "guilty by his agents of the corrupt practice of bribery", so that on 14 June his seat was vacated. The writ of election was suspended and a Royal Commission was established to investigate the extent of corruption, and its report was published in December, concluding that there had been extensive corruption. New writs were proposed unsuccessfully on 17 December 1906 and 14 February 1907, and the writ was not finally moved until 31 January 1908, leaving the seat without an MP for two years.

== Campaign ==
The campaign was "short but exceptionally keen". Goulding campaigned for tariff reform and had the support of most of Worcester City Council. The 1906 election court case had to be paid for by the county borough, which duly increased the rates, causing resentment against the Liberals as the party whose previous candidate had lodged the petition. There was also an anti-incumbency sentiment against the Liberal government, which was blamed for food price inflation.

== Result ==
1908 Worcester by-election
Party	Candidate	Votes	%	±%
Conservative	Edward Goulding	4,361	58.7	+7.9
Liberal	Harold Elverston	3,069	41.3	−7.9
Majority		1,292	17.4	+15.8
Turnout		7,430	87.8	−2.9
Registered electors		8,460		
Conservative hold		Swing	+7.9	
