= Richard Maisemore =

14th-century English politician

Richard Maisemore (fl. March 1377 – 1401) was an English politician. He sat as MP for Worcester in 1379, January 1380, November 1380, October 1382, April 1384, November 1384, 1385, 1386, November 1390 and 1391. He also served as tax collector of Worcester in March 1377 and as bailiff of Worcester from Michaelmas 1384 to 1386.
