= Thomas Belne =

English lawyer and politician

Thomas Belne (died c. 1421) was an English lawyer and politician in the late 14th and early 15th centuries, who served as Member of Parliament for Worcester in ten parliaments.

He was elected MP for Worcester in 1390, 1391, 1393, 1394, 1395, 1397, 1399, 1402, 1407, and 1410. He also served as an alderman and a bailiff in Worcester and a justice of the peace in Worcestershire. He died before May 1421, when his executors sold some of his holdings.
