= William Adyes =

16th-century English politician

- Born: by 1520
- Died: 1559 (aged 38–39)
- Occupation: politician
- Known for: member of parliament for Worcester

William Adyes or Addis (by 1520 – 1558 or 1559), of Worcester, was an English politician.

== Career ==
William Adyes was born by 1520 in the family of John Adyes and Joan. He married Ellen by 1541 and had two sons and one daughter. He held the office of clerk of the audit, Worcester by 1551-death (?).

William Adyes was a member of parliament for Worcester in 1555.
