= Richard Bullingham =

English politician

Richard Bullingham was an English politician.

== Biography ==
Bullingham was from a prominent Worcester family, being the brother of Bishop Nicholas Bullingham. He was elected MP for Worcester in 1559 and 1571, also holding local office in Worcester as auditor, councillor and bailiff.
