= Guthlac Edwards =

English politician

Guthlac Edwards (died 1560) was an English politician.

A Worcester clothier by trade, he was elected MP for Worcester in 1559, but is not mentioned in the proceedings of the Parliament. He made his will in October 1559, and it was proved on 3 June 1560.
