= Henry Spelman =

English antiquary

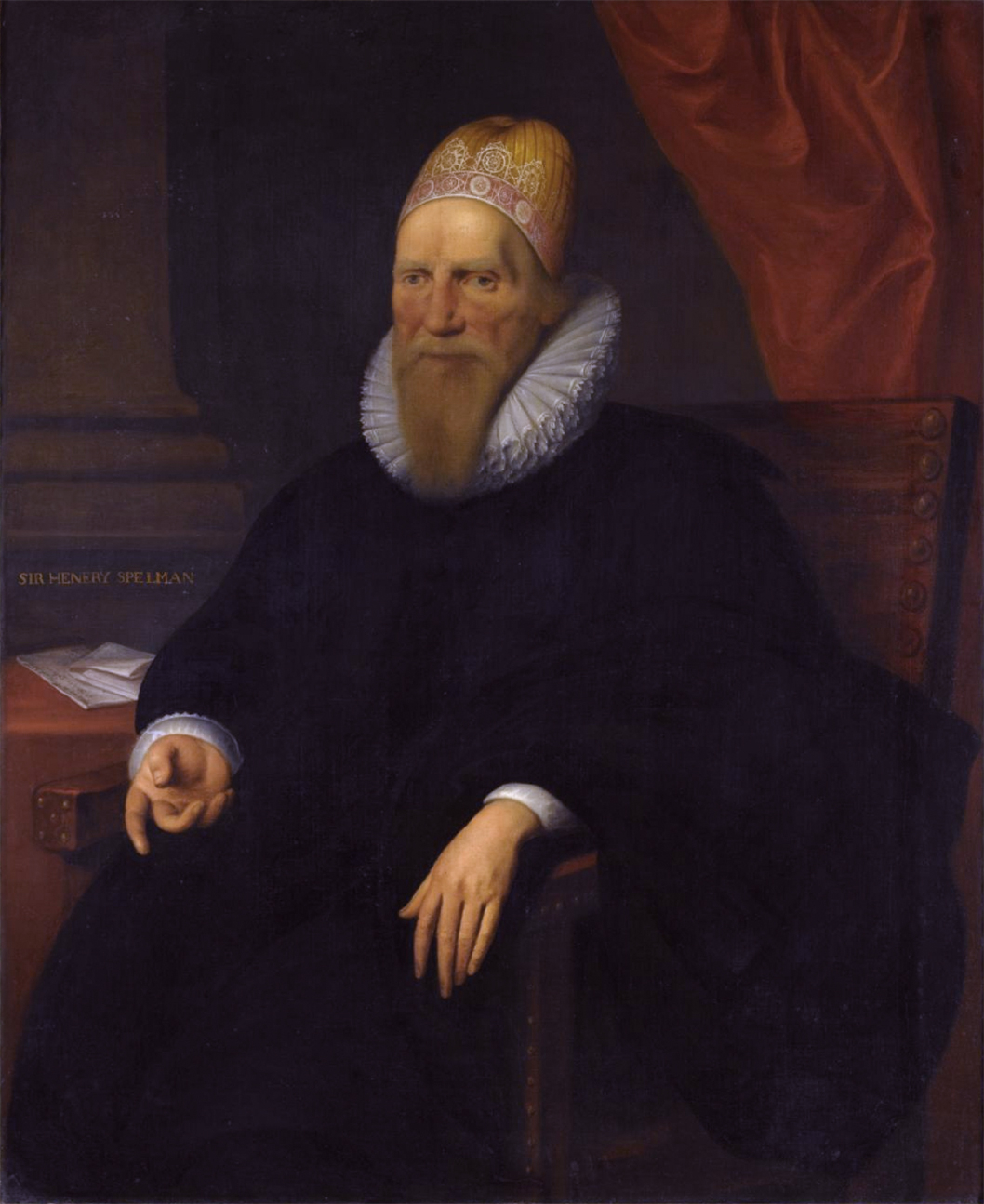
Henry Spelman, in an engraving by William Faithorne

Sir Henry Spelman (c. 1562 – October 1641) was an English antiquary, noted for his detailed collections of medieval records, in particular of church councils.

== Life ==
Spelman was born in Congham, Norfolk, the eldest son of Henry Spelman (d. 1581), of Congham, and the grandson of Sir John Spelman (1495–1544). He graduated from Trinity College, Cambridge in 1583.

He sat in parliament as a member for Castle Rising in Norfolk in 1593 and 1597–98. Knighted in 1603, he was appointed High Sheriff of Norfolk in 1604. In 1612, he settled in London near his friend Sir Robert Bruce Cotton. In 1617, he served on a commission to inquire into disputed Irish estates, and later took part into legal inquiries into the exactions levied on behalf of the Crown in the civil and ecclesiastical courts. Henry Spelman continued to rise in prestige served as a member of the Parliament of England for Worcester in 1625. In 1627, he became treasurer of the Guiana Company, and he was also an energetic member of the council for New England. His general services to the state were recognized in 1636 by a gift of money and two years later by the offer of the mastership of Sutton's Hospital, Charterhouse.

He died in London in October 1641, and was buried in Westminster Abbey.

== Personal life ==
He married Eleanor, daughter of John Lestrange, of Sedgeford in Norfolk, on 28 April 1590.

His nephew, also named Henry Spelman, became a notable translator in America.

His later years were spent in the house of his son-in-law, Sir Ralph Whitfield. He was survived by his sons, John Spelman, Judge Clement Spillman, and a daughter, Catherine, who married a Secretary of State.

== Works ==
His works include Concilia Ecclesiastica Orbis Britannici (1639) (a work containing many forgeries) and Glossarium Archaiologicum (completed by William Dugdale). His Reliquiae Spelmannianae was edited by Edmund Gibson in 1698.

Sir Henry has become known as master of the sacrilege narrative (the idea that divine retribution was visited on those who despoiled the monasteries of their estates during the English Reformation), not least through his experimental examination of the genealogies of all the landed families within a twenty-four mile radius of his Norfolk home.
