= Thomas Hill (Worcester MP) =

English politician

Thomas Hill (by 1500 – 1557), of Gray's Inn, London, Worcester and White Ladies Aston, Worcestershire, was an English politician.

He was a member (MP) of the parliament of England for Worcester in 1529, 1536 and April 1554, and for Heytesbury in October 1553.
