= 1961 Worcester by-election =

UK parliamentary by-election

The 1961 Worcester by-election was a by-election held for the House of Commons constituency of Worcester on 16 March 1961. It was won by the Conservative Party candidate Peter Walker.

== Candidates ==
The local Liberals selected 40-year-old journalist Robert Glenton as their candidate. He was an international rally driver, and a motoring correspondent for the Sunday Express. Born in June 1920 and educated at Scarborough College, he had previously stood as Liberal candidate for Hitchin at the 1959 general election.

== Result ==
Worcester by-election, 1961
Party	Candidate	Votes	%	±%
Conservative	Peter Walker	15,087	39.7	−18.0
Labour	Bryan Stanley	11,490	30.2	−12.1
Liberal	Robert Glenton	11,435	30.1	New
Majority		3,597	9.5	−5.8
Turnout		38,012	64.2	−15.1
Conservative hold		Swing	-3.0	

== See also ==
- Worcester (UK Parliament constituency)
- Worcester
- Lists of United Kingdom by-elections
