= Peter Walker, Baron Walker of Worcester =

British politician (1932–2010)

The Right Honourable The Lord Walker of Worcester MBE PC
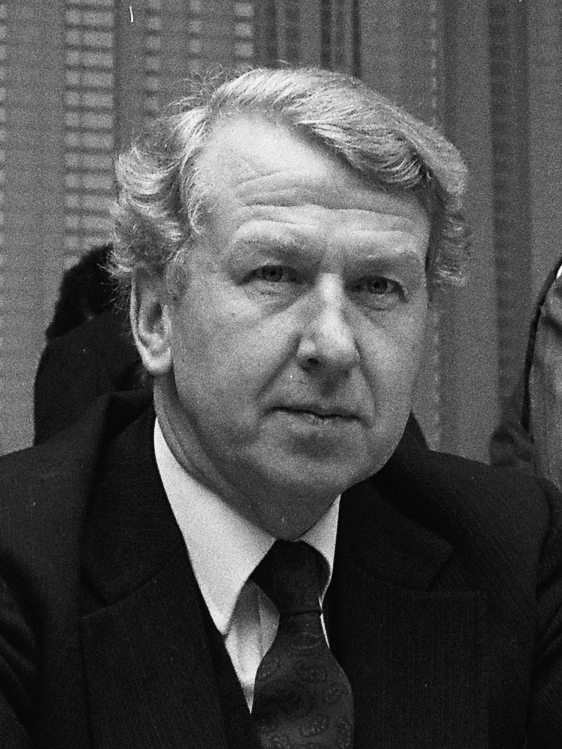
- Walker in 1980

Secretary of State for Wales
- In office 13 June 1987 – 4 May 1990
- Prime Minister: Margaret Thatcher
- Preceded by: Nicholas Edwards
- Succeeded by: David Hunt

Secretary of State for Energy
- In office 11 June 1983 – 13 June 1987
- Prime Minister: Margaret Thatcher
- Preceded by: Nigel Lawson
- Succeeded by: Cecil Parkinson

Minister of Agriculture, Fisheries and Food
- In office 4 May 1979 – 11 June 1983
- Prime Minister: Margaret Thatcher
- Preceded by: John Silkin
- Succeeded by: Michael Jopling

Shadow Secretary of State for Defence
- In office 19 June 1974 – 18 February 1975
- Leader: Edward Heath
- Preceded by: Ian Gilmour
- Succeeded by: George Younger

Shadow Secretary of State for Trade and Industry
- In office 4 March 1974 – 19 June 1974
- Leader: Edward Heath
- Preceded by: Tony Benn
- Succeeded by: Michael Heseltine

President of the Board of Trade
- In office 5 November 1972 – 4 March 1974
- Prime Minister: Edward Heath
- Preceded by: John Davies
- Succeeded by: Tony Benn

Secretary of State for Trade and Industry
- In office 5 November 1972 – 4 March 1974
- Prime Minister: Edward Heath
- Preceded by: John Davies
- Succeeded by: Peter Shore (Trade); Tony Benn (Industry)

Secretary of State for the Environment
- In office 15 October 1970 – 5 November 1972
- Prime Minister: Edward Heath
- Preceded by: Position established
- Succeeded by: Geoffrey Rippon

Minister of State for Housing and Local Government
- In office 19 June 1970 – 15 October 1970
- Prime Minister: Edward Heath
- Preceded by: Tony Crosland (Secretary of State for Local Government and Regional Planning)
- Succeeded by: Position abolished

Member of the House of Lords
- Lord Temporal
- Life peerage 7 July 1992 – 23 June 2010

Member of Parliament for Worcester
- In office 16 March 1961 – 16 March 1992
- Preceded by: George Ward
- Succeeded by: Peter Luff

Personal details
- Born: Peter Edward Walker; 25 March 1932 Brentford, England
- Died: 23 June 2010 (aged 78) Worcester, England
- Party: Conservative
- Children: 5 (including Robin)
- Education: Latymer Upper School

Peter Edward Walker, Baron Walker of Worcester, MBE, PC (25 March 1932 – 23 June 2010) was a British Conservative politician who served in Cabinet under Edward Heath and Margaret Thatcher. He was Member of Parliament (MP) for Worcester from 1961 to 1992 and was made a life peer in 1992.

Walker became the youngest National Chairman of the Young Conservatives in 1958. He was a founder of the Tory Reform Group, and served as Chairman of the Carlton Club.

== Early life and education ==
Born in Middlesex, younger son of Sydney Walker, a capstan operator at the Gramophone Company's factory at Hayes, and his wife Rose (née Dean), Walker was privately educated at Latymer Upper School in London. He did not go to college or university.

== Parliamentary career ==
Walker rose through the ranks of the Conservative Party's youth wing, the Young Conservatives. He was a branch chairman at the age of 14, and later National Chairman. He fought the Parliamentary seat of Dartford in the general elections of 1955 and 1959, being beaten each time by Labour's Sydney Irving.

Walker was appointed Member of the Order of the British Empire (MBE) in the 1960 Birthday Honours for political services. Within four years of his election to Parliament in a by-election in 1961, he had entered the Shadow Cabinet. He later served under Prime Minister Edward Heath as Minister of Housing and Local Government (1970), Secretary of State for the Environment (1970–72), the first person in the world to hold such a position, and Secretary of State for Trade and Industry (1972–74). From late 1974 to February 1975, Walker served as Shadow Defence Secretary. When Margaret Thatcher became the party leader, Walker did not serve in her Shadow Cabinet. But when the party came to power in 1979, he returned to the Cabinet as Minister of Agriculture, Fisheries and Food, in 1979. He later served as Secretary of State for Energy (1983–87). Whilst at the Department for Energy he played an important role in the Government's successful opposition to the 1984–85 miners' strike.

Walker then served as Secretary of State for Wales between 1987 and 1990. Although the role of Welsh Secretary was ostensibly one of the most junior jobs in the Cabinet, Walker claimed it gave him more influence as it gave access to key economic committees. He stood down from the Cabinet shortly before Thatcher herself was ousted in 1990. Though he had previously been a close ally of Heath's and was generally considered to be on the left of the party, he was nevertheless one of the longest-serving Cabinet members in Thatcher's government, serving during the entirety bar the last six months of her premiership. In October 1985, however, he had hit out at Thatcher's reluctance to inject money into the economy in order to ease mass unemployment, speaking of his fears that she could lose the next general election if unemployment did not fall. However, the Tories were re-elected in 1987, by which time unemployment was falling.

As noted above, Walker's 1970 appointment as Secretary of State for the Environment was notable in that he became the world's first Environment Minister, and was thus a source of considerable interest at the 1972 Stockholm Conference. The creation of the Department of the Environment came in response to the growing environmental concerns of the 1960s (not least the Torrey Canyon oil spill of 1967), and one of Walker's immediate concerns was to clean up the nation's waterways. The measures put in place have had substantial results for river life. For instance, the Thames was declared biologically dead in 1957 but today many species of fish thrive in the river, including wild salmon and trout.

Walker was a determined supporter of the hospice movement, becoming a patron of St Richard's Hospice in Worcester when it was founded in 1984. He campaigned determinedly for greater NHS support for St Richard's and the wider hospice movement, which is staffed largely by dedicated volunteers. During a House of Lords debate in 2000, Lord Walker stated: "Anyone who visits hospices and meets the volunteers—the people running them and guiding them—will recognise their unique spiritual and compassionate contribution to the health service."

Upon his retirement from Parliament, he was appointed a life peer in the 1992 Dissolution Honours, as Baron Walker of Worcester, of Abbots Morton in the County of Hereford and Worcester.

== Business career ==
During the 1960s he was the junior partner in Slater Walker, an asset stripping vehicle used by Jim Slater to generate immense paper profits until 1973. An ill-timed attempt to take over Hill Samuel resulted in the loss of city confidence in Slater Walker and Jim Slater became for a time a "minus millionaire". Peter Walker's political career survived and after retirement from politics he returned to the City as Chairman of Kleinwort Benson.

Other business positions Walker held included: Chairman of Allianz Insurance plc, Vice Chairman of Dresdner Kleinwort and non-executive director of ITM Power plc.

== Personal life and death ==
Walker and his wife had five children. His son Robin Walker was elected MP for the Worcester constituency in the 2010 general election.

He died at St Richard's Hospice, Worcester, on 23 June 2010, after suffering from cancer.

== Coat of arms ==
Coat of arms of Peter Walker, Baron Walker of Worcester
Coronet A Coronet of a Baron Crest Growing from a grassy mound Proper over which curls a footpath a cedar tree all Proper irradiated Or. Escutcheon Per pale Sable and Or semy of Portcullises and three turreted towers all counterchanged. Supporters Dexter a dragon Gules sinister a sea-lion Proper the head and mane Or supporting a trident also Proper the whole upon a compartment per bend dexter a grassy mound growing therefrom Red and Yellow cowslips all Proper sinister water barry wavy Azure and Argent over all in bend a footpath Proper Motto Diligentia Cum Humanitate (Diligence With Humanity)

Parliament of the United Kingdom
Preceded by George Ward	Member of Parliament for Worcester; 1961–1992	Succeeded by Peter Luff
Political offices
Preceded by Tony Crosland as Secretary of State for Local Government and Regional Planning	Minister of State for Housing and Local Government; 1970	Position abolished
New office	Secretary of State for the Environment; 1970–1972	Succeeded by Geoffrey Rippon
Preceded by John Davies	President of the Board of Trade; 1972–1974	Succeeded by Tony Benn
Preceded by John Davies	Secretary of State for Trade and Industry; 1972–1974	Succeeded by Peter Shore as Secretary of State for Trade
Preceded by John Davies	Secretary of State for Trade and Industry; 1972–1974	Succeeded by Tony Benn as Secretary of State for Industry
Preceded by Ian Gilmour	Shadow Secretary of State for Defence; 1974–1975	Succeeded by George Younger
Preceded by John Silkin	Minister of State for Agriculture, Fisheries and Food; 1979–1983	Succeeded by Michael Jopling
Preceded by Nigel Lawson	Secretary of State for Energy; 1983–1987	Succeeded by Cecil Parkinson
Preceded by Nicholas Edwards	Secretary of State for Wales; 1987–1990	Succeeded by David Hunt
