= Thomas Street (judge) =

English judge and politician

The Honourable Sir Thomas Street

Baron of the Exchequer

Personal details
- Born: 22 March 1625 Middlesex, England
- Died: 8 March 1696 (aged 70)
- Spouse: Lady Penelope Berkeley
- Education: Oxford University

Sir Thomas Street, MP, KB, JP (1625–1696) was an English politician and judge. He became a Baron of the Exchequer in 1681. He represented Worcester in the House of Commons from 1659 to 1679. In 1667, he became the Mayor of Worcester, as his father had been before him. In 1677, he became the Chief Justice of Brecknock, Glamorgan and Radnor. Following Monmouth's Rebellion in 1685, the Catholic King James II took to contravening the Test Act and began filling the military high-command with Catholics, leading to a confrontation with Parliament which took shape as the case of Godden v. Hales (1686), which was to be settled by the King's Bench. Of the ten judges who constituted the last King's Bench before the Glorious Revolution of 1688, Sir Thomas was the only one to rule against King James II's contravention of the Test Act in 1687.

== Biography ==
Street was born in Worcester, England in 1625. His father George Street (1594–1643) was the Mayor of Worcester, his grandfather John Street (d. 1622) was an alderman of Worcester, and his great-grandfather Francis Streate (d. 1607) was a Member of Parliament for Worcester. His father George was a cousin of John Street (1584–1633), who in 1605 killed two of the Gunpowder Plot conspirators and was rewarded with a pension "for that extraordinary service performed in killing those two traitors, Piercie and Catesbie, with two bulletts at one shott out of his muskett." Street matriculated at Lincoln College, Oxford on 22 April 1642, aged 16. He went on to enter Inner Temple in November 1646 and was called to the Bar on 24 November 1653. He was a member of the Oxford Circuit. He had his children by Lady Penelope Berkeley before dying in 1696, aged 70.

== Career ==
In 1659, Street was elected as the Member of Parliament for Worcester in the Third Protectorate Parliament. Street was re-elected MP for Worcester in 1660 for the Convention Parliament. He was appointed JP for Worcestershire on 10 July 1660. In 1661 he was re-elected MP for Worcester in the Cavalier Parliament and sat until 1679. An active member of parliament, Street was appointed to 175 committees, in twelve of which he took the chair, made sixteen recorded speeches, and three times acted as teller. From 1667 to 1677 he was Puisne judge of great sessions and ex officio JP for Brecknock, Glamorgan and Radnor. He became a Bencher of his Inn on 7 November 1669 but was fined £100 for refusing to come up to the bench when called. He became Serjeant at law on 3 July 1677 and was Chief Justice for Brecknock, Glamorgan and Radnor from 1677 to 1681. He became King's Sergeant on 23 October 1678. He was knighted on 8 June 1681 and was a Baron of the Exchequer from April 1681 to 1684. In 1682 he was recorder of Worcester and 1683 recorder of Droitwich 1683. He was a Justice of the Court of Common Pleas from 1684 to 1689. He died in 1696 and was buried in Worcester Cathedral.

== See also ==
- Street family

Parliament of England
Preceded by William Collins; Edward Giles	Member of Parliament for Worcester; 1659; With: William Collins	Succeeded by Not represented in restored Rump
