= Thomas Rowley Hill =

English politician (1816–1896)

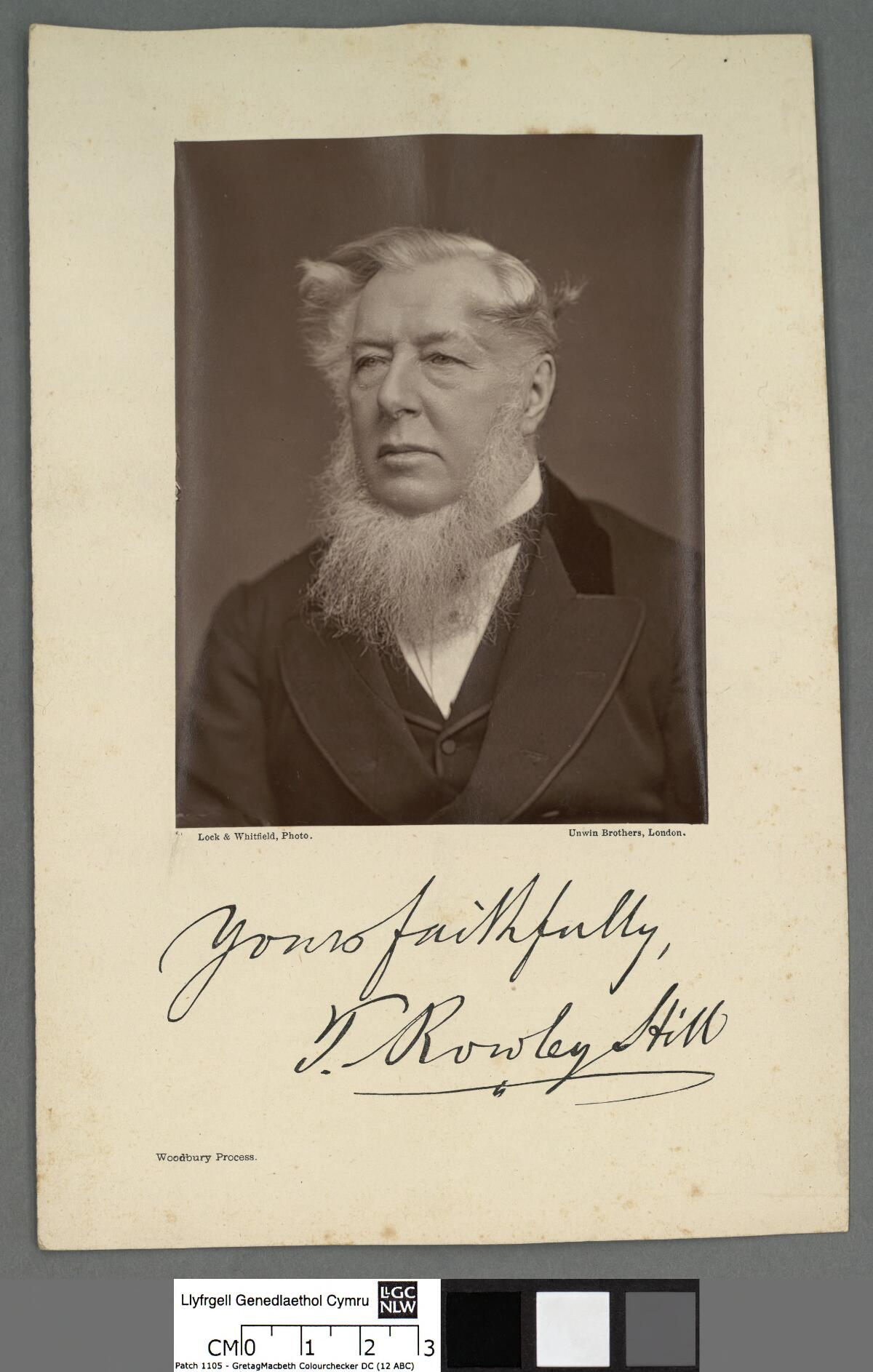
A portrait from the Welsh Portrait Collection at the National Library of Wales

Thomas Rowley Hill (1 March 1816 – 9 October 1896) was an English Liberal politician who sat in the House of Commons from 1874 to 1885.

Hill was born in Stourport, the son of William Hill FRAS. He was educated at University College London. He held a number of public offices, being Sheriff of Worcester in 1858, Mayor of Worcester in 1859 and a J.P. and deputy lieutenant for Worcestershire.

In 1868, Hill stood unsuccessfully for parliament at Worcester. He became High Sheriff of Worcestershire in 1870. At the 1874 general election, Hill was elected Member of Parliament for Worcestershire. He lost the seat in 1885 and failed to regain it when he stood in the 1886 general election. He was a member of the Worcester and Suckley school boards in 1879.

Hill was a very charitable man, and founded and endowed almshouses for four aged women in Berwick Street, Worcester. He died at the age of 80.

Hill first married Esther Evans, daughter of Richard Evans of Worcester in 1838. Esther died in 1839. In 1842, he married Mary Hilditch Evans, daughter of Edward Evans of Worcester.
