= Codrington (surname) =

Codrington is a surname, and may refer to:;

- Alfred Codrington (1854–1945), British Army officer
- Austin Codrington (born 1975), Jamaican-Canadian cricketer
- Bob Warren-Codrington (born 1950), Zimbabwean sports shooter
- Brandon Codrington (born 2000), American football player
- Chanlah Codrington, Antiguan politician
- Christopher Codrington (1668–1710), British soldier and plantation owner in Barbados
- Christopher Codrington (colonial administrator) (c.1640–c.1698), British plantation owner and colonial administrator
- Christopher Codrington (1764–1843), from 1797 known as Christopher Bethell-Codrington, British member of Parliament and sugar planter
- Christopher William Codrington (1805–1864), British Member of Parliament
- Edward Codrington (1770–1851), British admiral
- Eugene Codrington (born 1953), British karateka
- George Codrington (born 1966), Canadian cricketer
- Giovanni Codrington (born 1988), Dutch athlete
- Henry Codrington (1808–1877), British admiral of the fleet
- H. W. Codrington (1876–1942), British colonial financial administrator
- Isabel Codrington (1874–1943), British artist
- Jaidon Codrington (born 1984), American boxer
- Jim Codrington, Canadian actor
- John Codrington (c.1677–1754), English politician
- John Alfred Codrington (1898–1991), British Army officer with expertise in plants
- Kenneth de Burgh Codrington (1899–1986), British archaeologist and historian of Indian art
- Lisa Codrington, Canadian actress and playwright
- Nigel Codrington (born 1979), Guyanese footballer
- Robert Codrington (translator) (c.1602–c.1665), English author
- Robert Edward Codrington (1869–1908), British colonial administrator
- Robert Henry Codrington, (1830–1922), British Anglican priest and anthropologist
- Thomas Codrington (1829–1918), British engineer and antiquarian
- Thomas Codrington (priest) (died c. 1691), English Catholic theologian
- Vinny Codrington (born 1956), British rugby union footballer and cricket administrator
- Wilfred Codrington (born 1983), American legal scholar
- William Codrington (Royal Navy officer) (1832–1888), Junior Naval Lord
- William Codrington (British Army officer) (1804–1884), British general and politician
- William Melville Codrington (1892–1963), British soldier and diplomat
- Sir William Codrington, 1st Baronet (died 1738), British Member of Parliament
- Sir William Codrington, 2nd Baronet (1719–1792), British Member of Parliament
