= William Codrington =

William Codrington may refer to:

- William Codrington (Royal Navy officer) (1832–1888), Junior Naval Lord
- Sir William Codrington (British Army officer) (1804–1884), British general, Governor of Gibraltar and MP for Greenwich
- Sir William Codrington, 1st Baronet (died 1738), of the Codrington baronets, MP for Minehead
- Sir William Codrington, 2nd Baronet (1719–1792), of the Codrington baronets, MP for Tewkesbury and Beverley
- Sir William Codrington, 3rd Baronet (c. 1737–1816), of the Codrington baronets
- Sir William Raimond Codrington, 4th Baronet (1805–1873), of the Codrington baronets
- Sir William Mary Joseph Codrington, 5th Baronet (1829–1904), of the Codrington baronets
- Sir William Robert Codrington, 6th Baronet (1867–1932), of the Codrington baronets
- Sir William Richard Codrington, 7th Baronet (1904–1961), of the Codrington baronets
- Sir William Alexander Codrington, 8th Baronet (1934–2006), of the Codrington baronets

== See also ==
- Codrington (disambiguation)
