= Codrington baronets of Dodington (1st creation, 1721) =

Escutcheon of the Codrington baronets

The Codrington baronetcy, of Dodington in the County of Gloucester, was created in the Baronetage of Great Britain on 21 April 1721 for William Codrington, the first cousin and heir of Christopher Codrington, owner of large plantations in the West Indies. He later represented Minehead in the House of Commons, from 1737 to his death.

The 2nd Baronet sat as a Member of Parliament for Beverley from 1747 to 1761, and Tewkesbury from 1761 to 1792. He disinherited his son, Sir William, the 3rd Baronet.

== Codrington baronets, of Dodington (1721) ==
- Sir William Codrington, 1st Baronet (died 1738)
- Sir William Codrington, 2nd Baronet (1719–1792)
- Sir William Codrington, 3rd Baronet (c. 1737–1816)
- Sir William Raimond Codrington, 4th Baronet (1805–1873)
- Sir William Mary Joseph Codrington, 5th Baronet (1829–1904)
- Sir William Robert Codrington, 6th Baronet (1867–1932)
- Sir William Richard Codrington, 7th Baronet (1904–1961)
- Sir William Alexander Codrington, 8th Baronet (1934–2006)
- Sir Giles Peter Codrington, 9th Baronet (born 1943)

The heir apparent to the baronetcy is Christopher Harry Codrington (born 1988), eldest son of the 9th Baronet.

== Extended family ==
- Christopher Codrington (died 1698), uncle of the 1st Baronet, was Governor of the Leeward Islands and made the family fortune.
- Christopher Bethell-Codrington (1764–1843), who changed his name to Bethell-Codrington by Royal Licence in 1797, was the eldest son of Edward Codrington, fourth son of the 1st Baronet, and heir to the property of the 2nd Baronet. He sat as Member of Parliament for Tewkesbury, from 1797 to 1812. He assumed the title as soi-disant 4th Baronet, as did his heirs.
- Sir Edward Codrington, son of Edward Codrington, younger brother of Christopher Bethell-Codrington, was an admiral in the Royal Navy and served at the Battle of Trafalgar.
  - His second son Sir William Codrington, was a lieutenant-general in the Army and was elected in 1857 for Greenwich in the House of Commons.
  - His third son, Sir Henry Codrington, became an Admiral of the Fleet.

== Notes ==
Baronetage of Great Britain
Preceded by Sanderson baronets	Codrington baronets of Dodington; 21 April 1721	Succeeded by Frederick baronets
