= Codrington baronets of Dodington (2nd creation, 1876) =

Escutcheon of the Codrington baronets

The Codrington baronetcy, of Dodington in the County of Gloucester, was created in the Baronetage of the United Kingdom on 25 February 1876 for Gerald Codrington, High Sheriff of Gloucestershire in 1880. He was a grandson of Christopher Bethell-Codrington, and descendant of Sir William Codrington, 1st Baronet of the 1st creation. His father, Sir Christopher William Codrington (1805–1864), served as Member of Parliament for East Gloucestershire from 1834 to 1864, and married a daughter of the 7th Duke of Beaufort, another Gloucestershire landowner.

== Codrington baronets, of Dodington (1876) ==
- Sir Gerald William Henry Codrington, 1st Baronet (1850–1929)
- Sir Christopher William Gerald Henry Codrington, 2nd Baronet (1894–1979)
- Sir Simon Francis Bethell Codrington, 3rd Baronet (1923–2005)
- Sir Christopher George Wayne Codrington, 4th Baronet (born 1960)

The heir apparent to the baronetcy is William George Bethell Codrington (born 2003), eldest son of the 4th Baronet.

== Notes ==
Baronetage of the United Kingdom
Preceded by Walrond baronets	Codrington baronets of Dodington; 25 February 1876	Succeeded by Cust baronets
