= Admiral Codrington =

Admiral Codrington may refer to:

- Edward Codrington (1770–1851), British Royal Navy admiral
- Henry Codrington (1808–1877), British Royal Navy admiral
- William Codrington (Royal Navy officer) (1832–1888), British Royal Navy rear admiral
