= Simon Codrington =

Simon Codrington may refer to:

- Simon Codrington (American football) of the 2006 Florida Gators football team
- Sir Simon Francis Bethell Codrington, 3rd Baronet (1923–2005) of the Codrington baronets

== See also ==
- Codrington (disambiguation)
