= John Martin (1724–1794) =

British politician

John Martin (1724–1794) was a British politician who sat in the House of Commons from 1754 to 1761.

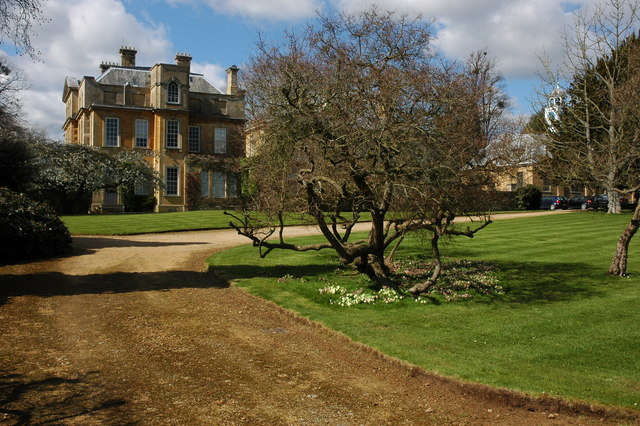
Overbury Court, Worcestershire

Martin was the eldest son of John Martin MP banker, of Overbury Court, Worcestershire and Lombard Street and his wife Catherine Jackson, daughter of Joseph Jackson of Sneyd Park, Gloucestershire. He was not a partner in the family banking house.

Martin was elected Member of Parliament for Tewkesbury after a contest at the 1754 general election. He was classed by Dupplin as a country gentleman supporting the court. His only known vote was against the Address on 13 November 1755. He did not stand in 1761.

Martin married Judith Bromley, daughter of William Bromley of Ham Court, Worcestershire on 3 December 1761. In 1767 he succeeded to his father's estates. He died on 28 May 1794.

Parliament of Great Britain
Preceded by The Viscount Gage; William Dowdeswell	Member of Parliament for Tewkesbury; 1754–1761; With: Nicolson Calvert	Succeeded by Nicolson Calvert; Sir William Codrington
