= Cust baronets =

Set index for Cust baronets

There have been two baronetcies created for members of the Cust family, one in the Baronetage of England and one in the Baronetage of the United Kingdom. One of the titles is extant.

- Cust baronets of Stamford (1677): see Baron Brownlow
- Cust baronets of Leasowe Castle (1876)
