= Joseph Martin (1726–1776) =

British banker and politician

Joseph Martin (1726–1776) was a British banker and politician who sat in the House of Commons from 1768 to 1776.

Martin was the second son of John Martin MP and banker, of Overbury and Lombard Street and his wife Catherine Jackson, daughter of Joseph Jackson of Sneyd Park, Gloucestershire. He joined the family bank, later known as Martins Bank, in 1746. In 1760 he succeeded his father as Senior Partner of the Bank. He held a large amount of Bank of England stock, and speculated in Government funds.

At the 1768 general election, Martin was elected Member of Parliament for Gatton on the interest of Sir George Colebrooke. He made his first speech on 10 December 1768. He was appointed Sheriff of London for 1770.

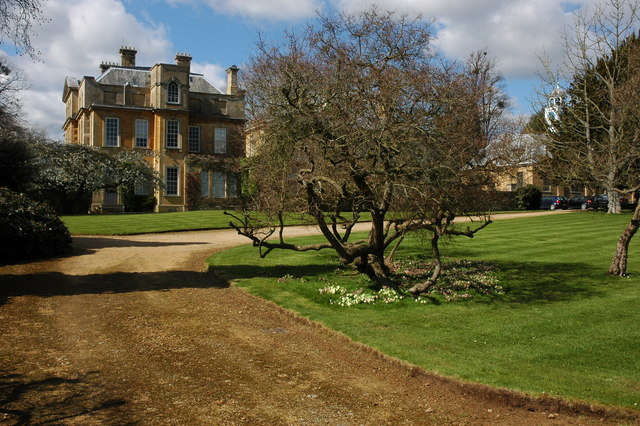
Overbury Court

After control of the Gatton seat was bought by Sir William Mayne, he moved to the family seat at Overbury Court and was returned unopposed to represent nearby Tewkesbury at the 1774 general election.

Martin died on 30 March 1776. He married Eleanor Torriano, daughter of Sir John Torriano of College Hill, London on 6 February 1749. Eleanor & Joseph had 4 sons and 3 daughters.

Parliament of Great Britain
Preceded by Thomas Brand; Lieutenant-Colonel Edward Harvey	Member of Parliament for Gatton; 1768–1774; With: Hon. John Damer	Succeeded by Sir William Mayne; Robert Scott
Preceded by Nicolson Calvert; Sir William Codrington	Member of Parliament for Tewkesbury; 1774–1776; With: Sir William Codrington	Succeeded by James Martin; Sir William Codrington
