= James Martin (1738–1810) =

British banker and politician

Member of the British Parliament for Tewkesbury
- In office 1776–1807

Personal details
- Born: 4 June 1738
- Died: 26 January 1810 (aged 71)
- Spouse: Penelope Skipp (m. 1774)
- Parents: John Martin (father); Catherine Jackson (mother)

James Martin (1738–1810) was a British banker and politician who sat in the House of Commons for 31 years from 1776 to 1807.

Martin was the third son of John Martin MP banker, of Overbury and Lombard Street and his wife Catherine Jackson, daughter of Joseph Jackson of Sneyd Park, Gloucestershire. He was born on 4 June 1738 and was educated by Rev. Matthew Bloxam, vicar of Overbury and Rev. James Graham, of Hackney. On leaving school he entered the family banking house. He married Penelope Skipp, daughter of Joseph Skipp of Upper Hall, Ledbury, Herefordshire on 17 February 1774.

Martin was elected Member of Parliament for Tewkesbury in a by-election on 8 April 1776 following the death of his brother Joseph. He "acquired a reputation for his scrupulously independent attitude".

Martin was returned unopposed for Tewkesbury in the 1780 general election. He acquired the nickname Starling Martin after condemning Fox's India bill on 1 December 1783 by saying he "wished there were a starling to perch on the Speaker's chair and repeat incessantly 'disgraceful, shameless Coalition'".

By 1790, Martin was head of the family bank in London. He was returned unopposed in 1790 but there was a contest in 1796. He was returned unopposed in 1802. He was considering retiring before the next election, but in 1806 he stood again and was returned unopposed. He retired in 1807, intending for his eldest son John to take his seat, but John was not successful in the election.

Martin died on 26 January 1810.

Parliament of Great Britain
| Preceded by Joseph Martin; Sir William Codrington | Member of Parliament for Tewkesbury; 1776–1800; With: Sir William Codrington; Lieutenant-Colonel William Dowdeswell; Christopher Bethell Codrington | Succeeded by Parliament of the United Kingdom |
Parliament of the United Kingdom
| Preceded by Parliament of Great Britain | Member of Parliament for Tewkesbury; 1801–1807; With: Christopher Bethell Codrington | Succeeded by Charles Hanbury Tracy; Christopher Bethell Codrington |
