= Sir Thomas Colby, 1st Baronet =

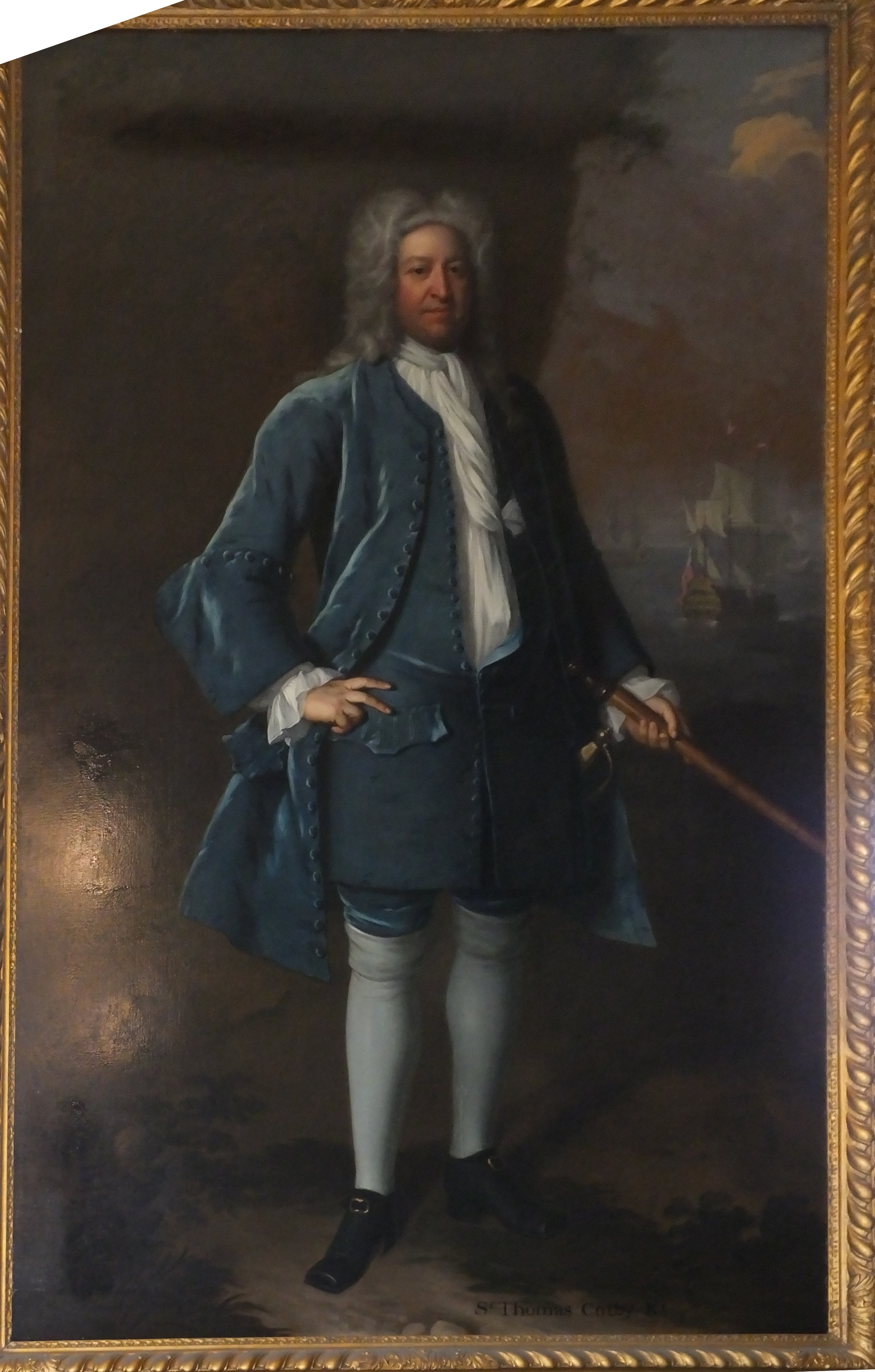
Sir Thomas Colby, MP for Rochester, portrait in Rochester Guildhall.

Sir Thomas Colby, 1st Baronet (c. 1670 – 23 September 1729) was an English politician who sat in the House of Commons from 1724 to 1727.

== Life ==
Colby was the son of Philip Colby (1638–92) of Colby House and his wife Elizabeth Flewellin, daughter of William Flewellin. His father became rich in the last years of his life by supplying a considerable amount of clothing to the army of William III.

Colby took up residence in Colby House, on the site where Kensington Court Gardens now stands. It was rebuilt to a design by Nicholas Hawksmoor, c.1722. The house was demolished in 1873.

On 21 June 1720, Colby was created a baronet, of Kensington in the County of Middlesex. He earned a reputation for great wealth, invested mainly in stocks and was cited as an example of avarice by William King, a Jacobite don and satirist.

Escutcheon of the Colby baronets

Colby was Navy Commissioner, and sat as Member of Parliament for Rochester from 1724 to 1727, following the death of Sir Thomas Palmer. The constituency was effectively controlled by the Admiralty. For the 1727 general election, he stepped down, at the request of the Whig administration, making way for David Polhill.

== Death and legacy ==
Colby died a bachelor in September 1729. According to King his death was caused when he got up in the middle of the night in a heavy sweat because he was worried the servants might steal a bottle of port as he had left the key lying around. The baronetcy became extinct on his death. He was buried with great pomp in the family vault in the parish church. It was thought that he died intestate and there was great controversy about his estate, which was said to be nearly £200,000. He had in fact drafted a will bequeathing his house and property in Kensington to his "Kinsman and namesake Thomas Colby late Clerke of the Cheque of His Majesty's Yard at Portsmouth", but failed to sign or date it. That will was therefore ignored and administration of the estate was granted to his cousin Flewellin Apsley, to be divided among his heirs.

Parliament of Great Britain
| Preceded by Sir Thomas Palmer, Bt; Sir John Jennings | Member of Parliament for Rochester; 1724–1727; With: Sir John Jennings | Succeeded by David Polhill; Sir John Jennings |
Baronetage of Great Britain
| New creation | Baronet (of Kensington); 1720–1729 | Extinct |
| Preceded by Mosley baronets | Colby baronets of Kensington; 21 June 1720 | Succeeded by Chapman baronets |
