= John Martin (1692–1767) =

British banker and politician

John Martin (1692–1767) was a British banker and politician who sat in the House of Commons from 1741 to 1747.

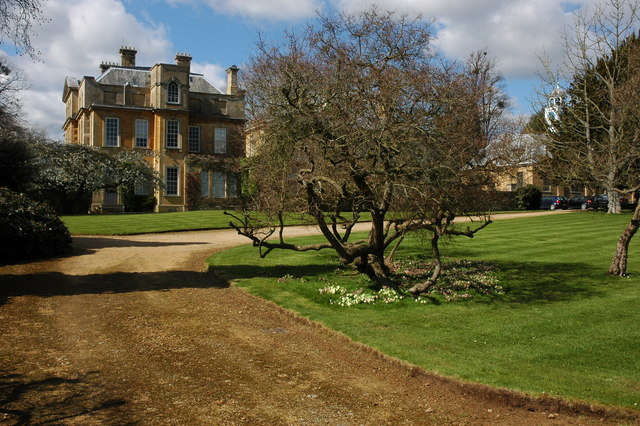
Overbury Court

Martin was the third son of William Martin of Evesham, Worcestershire and his wife Elizabeth Knight, daughter of John Knight of Barrells, Warwickshire and was baptised on 8 July 1692. He bought Overbury Court in 1723 from the Parsons family and rebuilt the Elizabethan manor house in the Georgian style in 1740 after a disastrous fire. He married firstly Catherine Jackson, daughter of Joseph Jackson of Sneyd Park, Gloucestershire before 1724.

He was connected with the family bank, later Martins Bank, in Lombard Street by 1731 though not yet a partner. He succeeded his younger brother James as senior partner in 1744.

Martin stood for Parliament at Tewkesbury at the 1734 general election but was defeated. He was returned unopposed as Member of Parliament for Tewkesbury in the 1741 general election. He stood as a Whig and voted with the Administration in all recorded divisions. He did not stand again in 1747.

Martin married secondly Anna Kinloch, a widow and kinswoman of Chipping Norton, Oxfordshire on. 21 July 1763. He died on 7 March 1767. His sons by his first wife Catherine — John, Joseph, and James — were all elected to Parliament.

Parliament of Great Britain
Preceded by The Viscount Gage; Robert Tracy	Member of Parliament for Tewkesbury; 1741–1747; With: The Viscount Gage	Succeeded by The Viscount Gage; William Dowdeswell
