= William Dowdeswell (British Army officer) =

British soldier and politician

General William Dowdeswell
- Born: 27 February 1760; London
- Died: 1 December 1828 (aged 68); Pull Court, Worcestershire
- Education: Westminster School
- Military career
- Allegiance: United Kingdom
- Branch: British Army
- Service years: 1780–1811
- Rank: General
- Unit: 1st Foot Guards
- Commands: Governor of the Bahamas; 60th Regiment of Foot; Acting Commander-in-Chief, India
- Conflicts: French Revolutionary Wars; Flanders campaign; Siege of Valenciennes; Battle of Lincelles; Siege of Dunkirk; Second Anglo-Maratha War; Siege of Bharatpur

Member of Parliament for Tewkesbury
- In office 19 March 1792 – November 1797 Serving with James Martin

General William Dowdeswell (27 February 1760 – 1 December 1828) was a British soldier and politician from Worcestershire.

== Career ==
The third son of William Dowdeswell, he joined the army as a Lieutenant and Captain in the 1st Foot Guards in 1785. He was a Member of Parliament (MP) for Tewkesbury from 1792 to 1797.

On the opening of the war with revolutionary France, he served with his regiment in the Flanders Campaign under the Duke of York 1793, seeing action at the siege of Valenciennes and the Siege of Dunkirk. Made colonel of the 86th Foot on 26 Jan 1797, Dowdeswell was appointed Governor of the Bahamas from 1797 to 1802. On 29th Sept 1803, he was promoted Major-General, and then was posted to India under Lake from 1805. He took part in the siege of Bhurtpore. He was made Commander-in-Chief in India in 1807, and promoted Lieutenant-General on 25 July 1810.

His family owned the Pull Court estate near Bushley in Worcestershire, and many of his ancestors had been MPs, including his father William Dowdeswell, who was Chancellor of the Exchequer from 1785 to 1766.

Dowdeswell was known as a collector of prints by old English engravers and made a speciality of grangerizing. He died unmarried in 1828, his estates, including Pull Court, passing to his younger brothers.

Parliament of Great Britain
Preceded by Sir William Codrington; James Martin	Member of Parliament for Tewkesbury; 1792–1797; With: James Martin	Succeeded by James Martin; Christopher Bethell Codrington
Political offices
Preceded by John Forbes	Governor of the Bahamas; 1797–1801	Succeeded by John Halkett
