= Edward Codrington =

Royal Navy officer (1770–1851)

Admiral Sir Edward Codrington GCB FRS
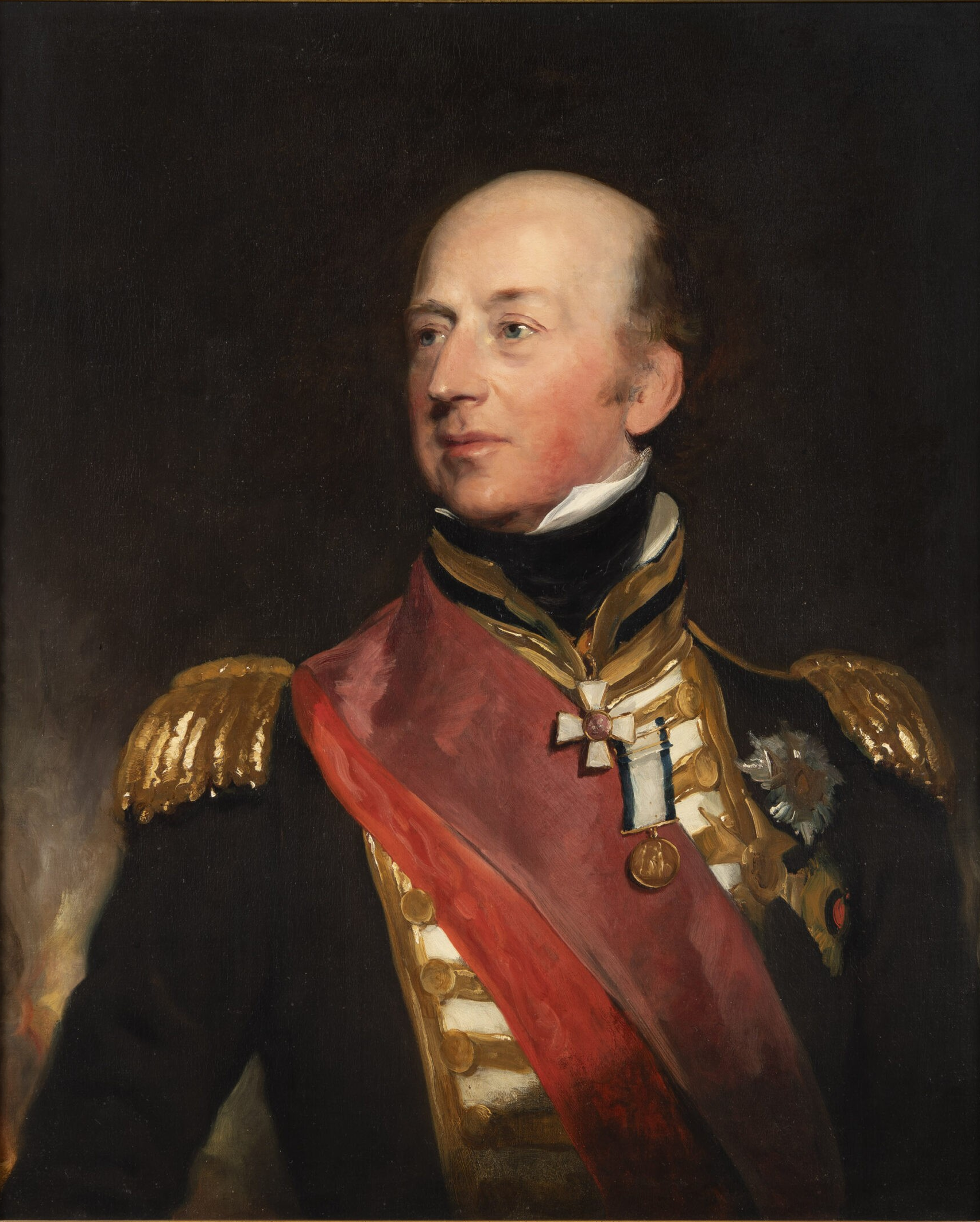
- Portrait of Edward Codrington by Sir Thomas Lawrence, 1828
- Born: 27 April 1770; Dodington, Gloucestershire, England
- Died: 28 April 1851 (aged 81); London, England
- Relatives: Christopher Bethell-Codrington (brother); General Sir William Codrington (son); Admiral of the Fleet Sir Henry Codrington (son)
- Military career
- Allegiance: Great Britain; United Kingdom
- Branch: Royal Navy
- Service years: 1783–1851
- Rank: Admiral
- Commands: Portsmouth Command; Mediterranean Fleet; HMS Orion; HMS Druid; HMS Babet
- Conflicts: French Revolutionary Wars; Glorious First of June; Napoleonic Wars; Battle of Trafalgar; Walcheren Campaign; War of 1812; Greek War of Independence; Battle of Navarino
- Awards: Knight Grand Cross of the Order of the Bath; Order of St. George, 2nd Class (Russia)

Admiral Sir Edward Codrington, GCB, FRS (27 April 1770 – 28 April 1851) was a Royal Navy officer who served in the French Revolutionary and Napoleonic Wars, War of 1812 and Greek War of Independence. He is best known for commanding a combined fleet of the British, French and Russian navies to victory over the Ottoman Navy at the 1827 Battle of Navarino.

== Early life and career ==
The youngest of three brothers born to Edward Codrington the elder (1732–1775) and Rebecca Lestourgeon (Sturgeon) (1736–1770), Codrington came from a long military tradition. His father was the youngest son of Sir William Codrington, 1st Baronet. Their aristocratic, landowning family, was descended from John Codrington, reputed to be standard-bearer to Henry V at Agincourt, and related to the Codrington baronets, Codrington was educated by an uncle named Mr Bethell. He was sent for a short time to Harrow, and entered the Royal Navy in July 1783. He served off the Eastern Seaboard of the United States, in the Mediterranean and in home waters, until he was promoted to lieutenant on 28 May 1793, when Lord Howe selected him to be signal lieutenant on the flagship of the Channel fleet at the beginning of the French Revolutionary Wars. In that capacity he served on the 100-gun HMS Queen Charlotte during the operations which culminated in the battle of the Glorious First of June.

As a reward for his actions at the battle, on 7 October 1794 he was promoted to commander, and on 6 April 1795 attained the rank of Post-Captain and the command of the 22-gun Babet from which he observed the Battle of Groix on 23 June 1795. His next command, from July 1796 to March 1797, was the frigate Druid whom he commanded in the Channel and off the coast of Portugal. On 7 January 1797, Druid, along with Doris and Unicorn captured the French frigate Ville de L'Orient, armed en flûte and carrying 400 hussars to join the rebels in Ireland.

Following this, Codrington spent a period largely on land and on half-pay for some years. In December 1802, he married Jane Hall, an English woman from Kingston, Jamaica (with whom he had 3 sons and 3 daughters), and remained without a ship until the Peace of Amiens came to a close in 1803.

In 1797, Edward Codrington, his brother William John, and his sister Caroline, jointly inherited their uncle Christopher Bethell's residuary estates, including a slave plantation in Antigua.

His eldest brother Christopher Bethell-Codrington inherited their uncle's main estates and Dodington Park, which was later rebuilt by James Wyatt between 1798 and 1816.

== Service in the Napoleonic Wars and the War of 1812 ==
On the renewal of hostilities with France he remained in frigates for some time before being given the ship of the line HMS Orion in the spring of 1805 which was attached to Admiral Nelson's fleet off Cádiz in the blockade of the combined fleet. Codrington and Orion were engaged at the Battle of Trafalgar on 21 October 1805, where Orion was stationed to the rear of the northern division and therefore took two hours to reach battle. Once there, Codrington ignored all other ships and focused entirely on closing with a hitherto unengaged French ship, the Swiftsure, forcing her to surrender. He then attacked but failed to capture the Spanish flagship Principe de Asturias before moving on to the Intrepide, the only ship of the northern division to return. Orion, with other ships, dismasted and then sailed round her, firing continually until she surrendered.

For the next several years, Codrington fought alongside the Spanish against the French in the Mediterranean Sea, commanding a squadron that harried French shipping and made numerous coastal raids. During this time also participated in the disastrous Walcheren expedition in 1809.

The two months of May and June in 1811 were to prove his most testing time while stationed on Spain's eastern seaboard. He went to great lengths to help the Spanish besieged at Tarragona by the French Army of Aragon under Louis Gabriel Suchet. Convinced that the Marquis de Campoverde, the Spanish general in charge of Tarragona, was not up to the task, Codrington, who had a clearer understanding of the situation, helped the British military agent Charles William Doyle to contrive a plan of succour. Through his own personal efforts Codrington brought to Tarragona 6,300 Spanish infantry and 291 artillerymen as reinforcements. He spent many nights in the port area guiding cannon launches against the enemy. When the city fell, he rescued over 600 people from the beach in a Dunkirk-style operation under fire from enemy cannon and personally undertook to reunite mothers and babies who had been separated during the evacuation. Afterwards, he intervened on a political level to stop Captain General de Lacy disarming the local Catalan Somaténs (militias).

Codrington was promoted to the rank of Rear-Admiral of the Blue on 4 June 1814, while he was serving off the coast of North America as captain of the fleet to Vice Admiral Sir Alexander Cochrane during the operations against Washington, Baltimore and New Orleans during the War of 1812. In recognition of this service, he was made a Knight Commander of the Order of the Bath in 1815. He became a Rear-Admiral of the Red on 12 August 1819, and then a vice admiral on 10 July 1821. He was also elected a Fellow of the Royal Society in February 1822.

== Greek War of Independence and the Battle of Navarino ==
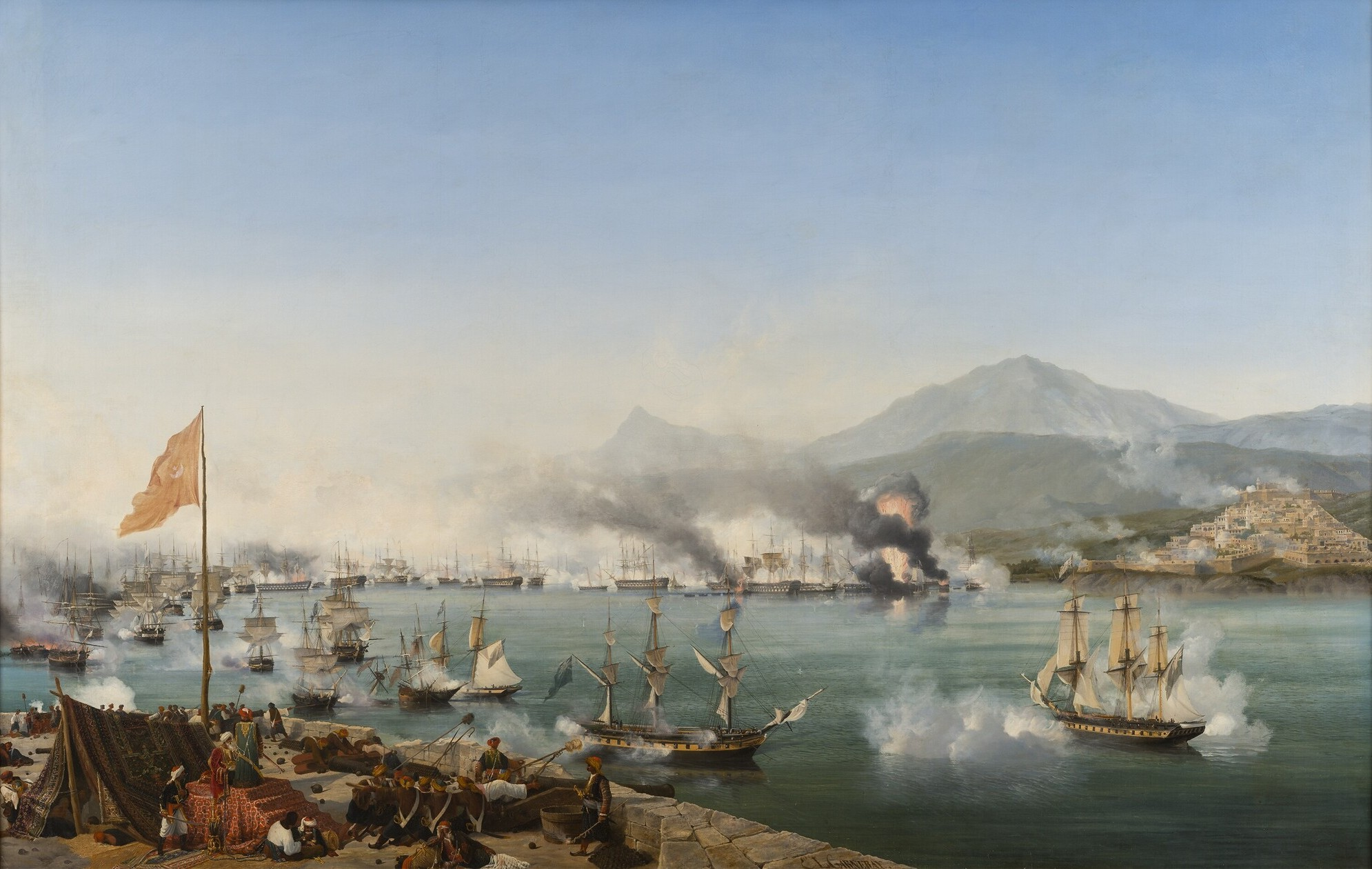
The Naval Battle of Navarino (1827). Oil painting by Carneray

In December 1826 Codrington was appointed Commander-in-Chief, Mediterranean Fleet and sailed on 1 February 1827. From that date until his recall on 21 June 1828 he was engaged in the arduous duties imposed on him by the Greek War of Independence, which had led to anarchy in occupied Greece and surrounding areas. His orders were to enforce a peaceful solution on the situation in Greece (although he was told that he could use force as a last resort), but Codrington was not known for his diplomacy, and on 20 October 1827 he destroyed the Turkish and Egyptian fleet at the Battle of Navarino while in command of a combined British, French and Russian fleet.

After the battle Codrington went to Malta to refit his ships. He remained there till May 1828, when he sailed to join his French and Russian colleagues on the coast of the Morea. They endeavoured to enforce the evacuation of the peninsula by Ibrahim Pasha peacefully. The Pasha made diplomatic difficulties, which came in the form of continuous genocide against the Greeks of Morea who were to be replaced with Muslims from Africa, and on 25 July the three admirals agreed that Codrington should go to Alexandria to obtain Ibrahim's recall by his father Mehemet Ali. Codrington had heard on 22 June of his own supersession, but, as his successor had not arrived, he carried out the arrangement made on 25 July, and his presence at Alexandria led to the treaty of 6 August 1828, by which the evacuation of the Morea was settled. His services were recognised by the grant of the Grand Cross of the Bath, but there is no doubt that the British government was embarrassed by his heavy-handed gunboat diplomacy and not too impressed by the further weakening of Russia's main opponent, the Ottomans.

== Later years ==
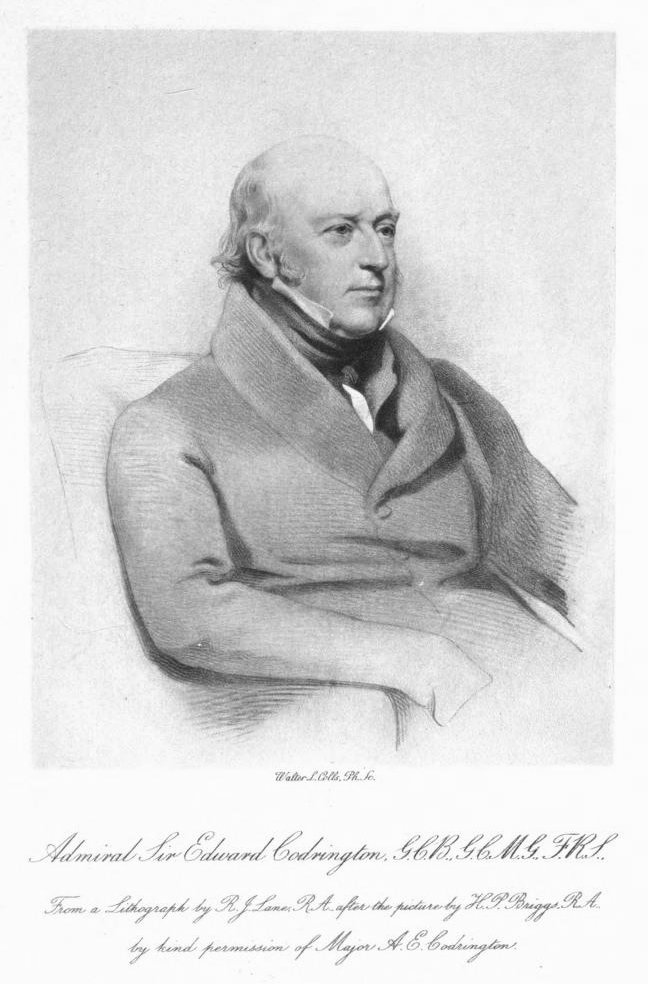
Lithograph of the Admiral, circa 1897

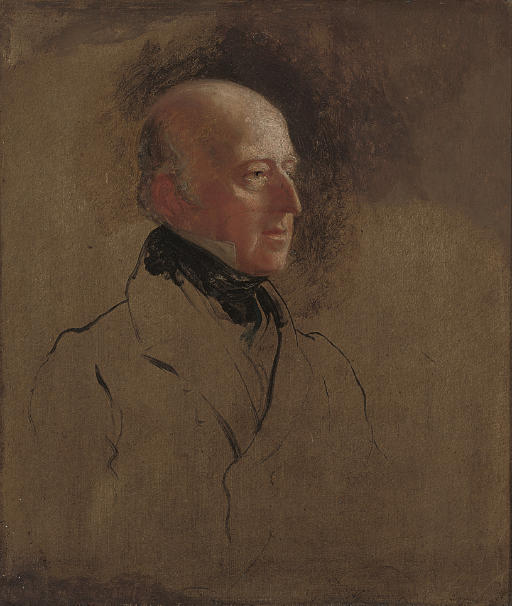
Admiral Codrington, MP for Devonport, painted for the reformed House of Commons picture by Sir George Hayter in 1836

After his return home, Codrington spent some time in defending himself, and then in leisure abroad. He commanded a training squadron in the Channel in 1831 and became a full admiral on 10 January 1837. He was elected member of parliament for Devonport in 1832, and sat for that constituency until he accepted the Chiltern Hundreds in 1839. From November 1839 to December 1842 he was Commander-in-Chief, Portsmouth.

On 5 October 1835, under the terms of the Slavery Abolition Act 1833, Codrington was awarded government compensation of £2,588 6s 6d for the 190 slaves he had owned at the Rooms plantation on Antigua, and who had been freed under the terms of the act.

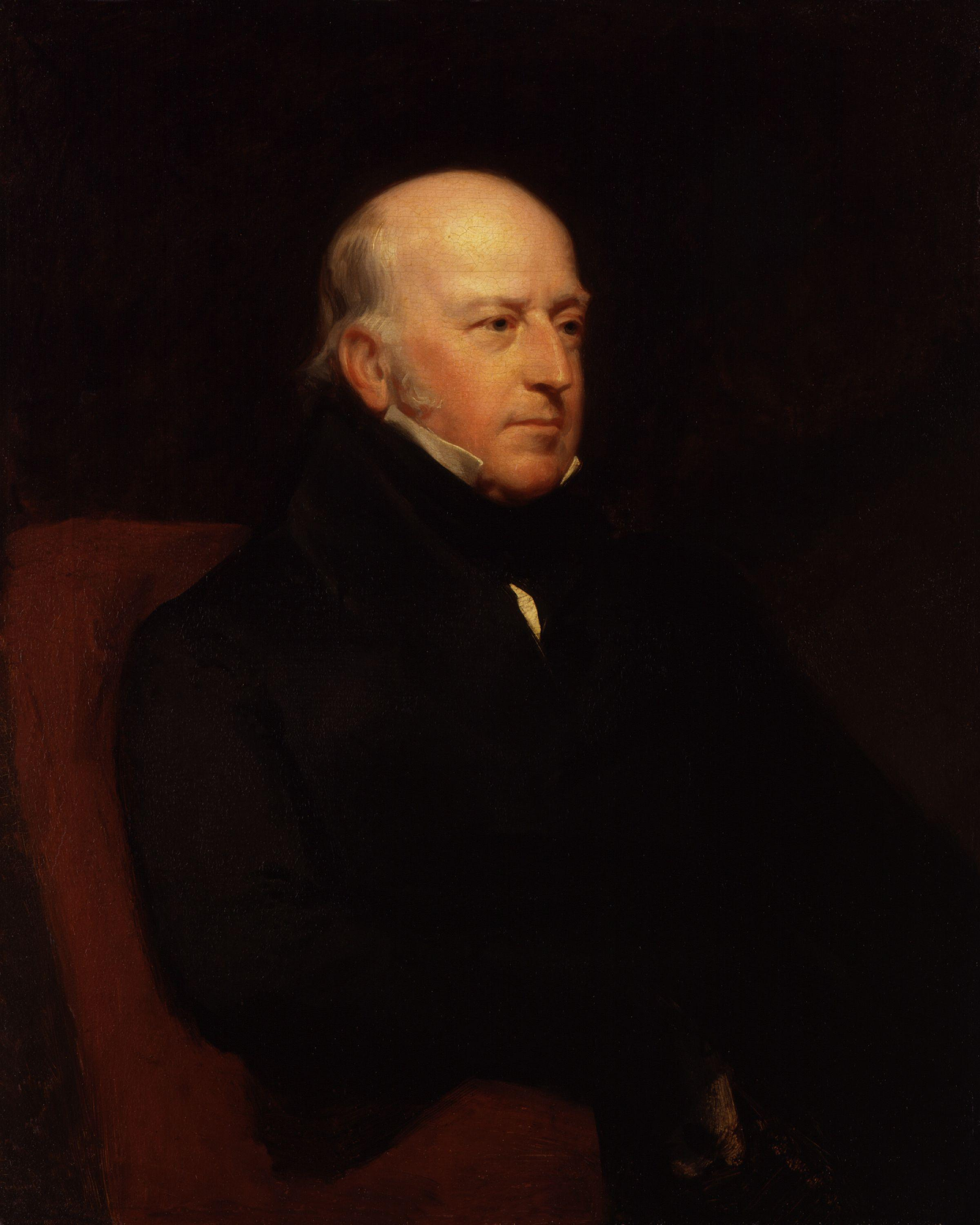
Sir Edward Codrington by Henry Perronet Briggs, 1843

Codrington died in London on 28 April 1851. He left two sons, both of whom achieved distinction in the British armed forces. Sir William Codrington (1804–1884) was a commander in the Crimean War. Sir Henry Codrington (1808–1877), a naval officer, became an Admiral of the Fleet. A third son, Edward Codrington, was a midshipman aboard Cambrian when he died sometime in 1821 or 1822 in the Mediterranean. He had been taking a cutter to Hydra when a squall overturned the boat, drowning him, a merchant, and three crewmen.

Codrington was buried in St Peter's Church, Eaton Square, but in 1954 the remains were reburied at Brookwood Cemetery in Surrey, plot number 70. Plaques to his memory can be found in St Paul's Cathedral and St Mary's Church, Dodington, close to the family home at Dodington Park, and there is a large obelisk dedicated to the memory of him and the other officers at Navarino at Pylos in Greece.

Numerous roads are named after him in Greece and stamps with his figure have been issued. At least three pubs; one in south-west London and two now-closed pubs in Coventry and south-east London are named after him.

In June 2020, a plaque in Brighton commemorating Codrington was removed following protest over the commemoration of a slave owner as part of the George Floyd protests.

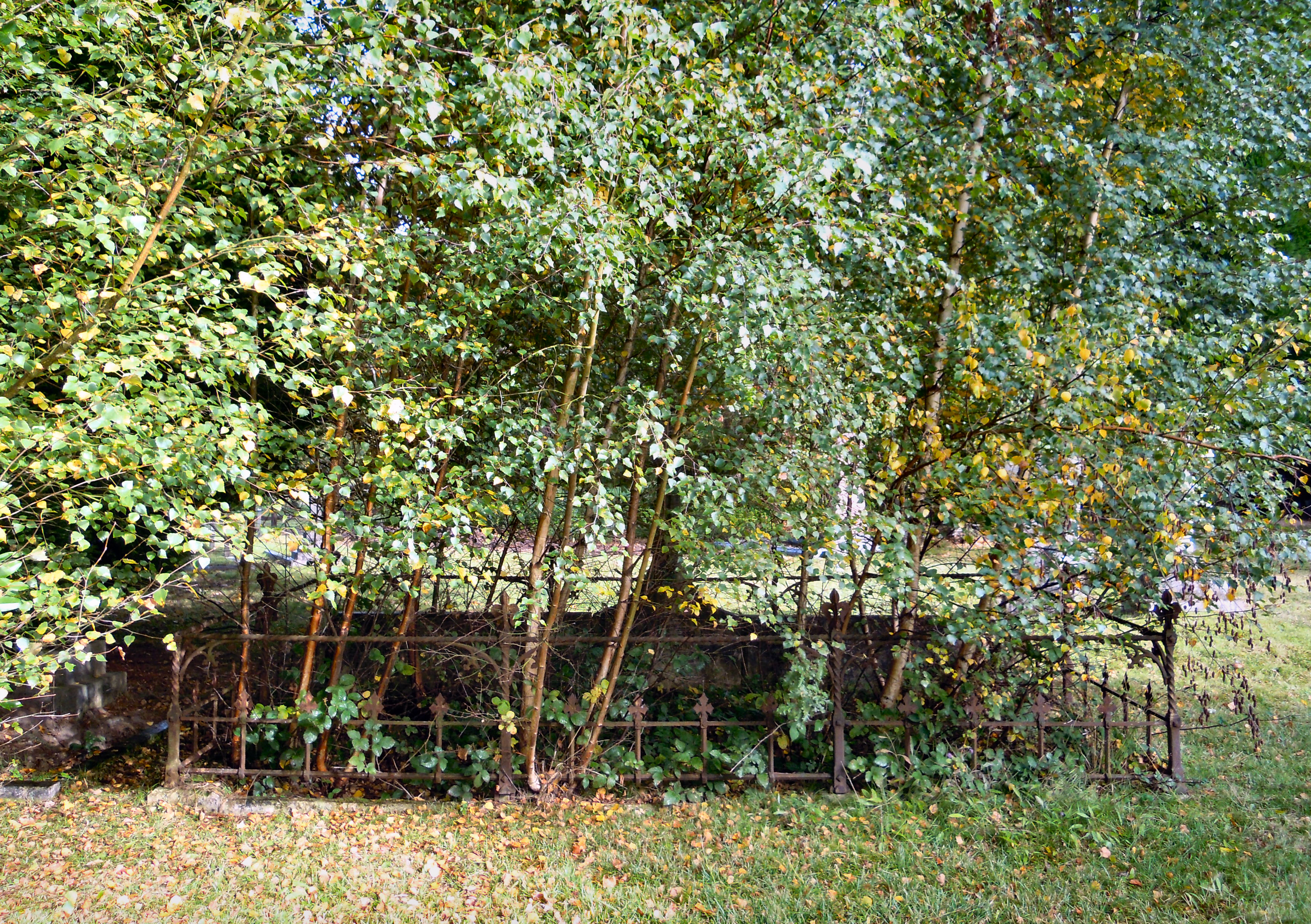
Codrington is buried in the family plot in Brookwood Cemetery

== Notes ==
Parliament of the United Kingdom
| New constituency | Member of Parliament for Devonport; 1832–1839; With: Sir George Grey | Succeeded by Sir George Grey; Henry Tufnell |
Military offices
| Preceded by Sir Harry Burrard-Neale | Commander-in-Chief, Mediterranean Fleet; 1826–1828 | Succeeded by Sir Pulteney Malcolm |
| Preceded by Charles Elphinstone Fleeming | Commander-in-Chief, Portsmouth; 1839–1842 | Succeeded by Sir Charles Rowley |
