= Sanderson baronets of Greenwich (1720) =

Sanderson baronets
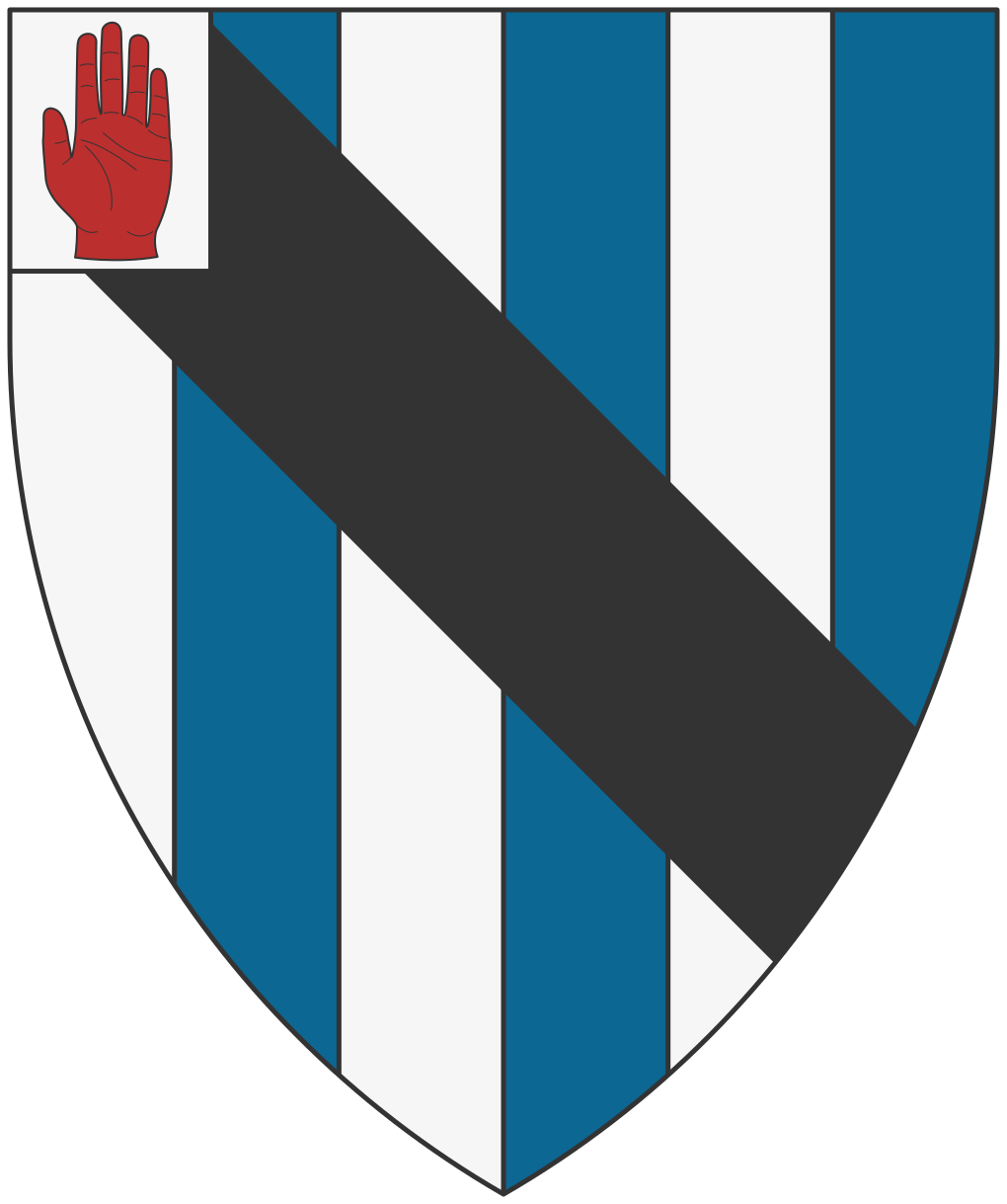
- Escutcheon of the Sanderson baronets of Greenwich
- Creation date: 1720
- Status: extinct
- Extinction date: 1760
- Arms: Paly of six, argent and azure, a bend sable.

The Sanderson baronetcy, of Greenwich in the County of Kent, was created in the Baronetage of Great Britain on 19 July 1720 for Sir William Sanderson, who held the parliamentary position of Black Rod. A naval captain, he had commanded the Peregrine on which King George I was brought to England in 1714, a service for which he was knighted.

The title became extinct on the death of the 3rd Baronet in 1760.

== Sanderson baronets, of Greenwich (1720) ==
- Sir William Sanderson, 1st Baronet (died 1727)
- Sir William Sanderson, 2nd Baronet (1692–1754)
- Sir William Sanderson, 3rd Baronet (1746–1760)

== Notes ==
Baronetage of Great Britain
Preceded by Chapman baronets	Sanderson baronets of Greenwich; 19 July 1720	Succeeded by Codrington baronets
