= Codrington =

Codrington may refer to:

== Places ==
- Codrington, Antigua and Barbuda
  - Barbuda Codrington Airport
  - Codrington Lagoon
- Codrington Island, small uninhabited island off the north-east coast of Antigua
- Codrington, Gloucestershire, England
- Codrington, Ontario, Canada
- Codrington, Victoria, Australia
  - Codrington Wind Farm, Victoria
- Mount Codrington, Antarctica

== Institutions ==
- Codrington College, Anglican theological college in St. John, Barbados
- Codrington Library, All Souls College, Oxford, England

== People with the surname ==
- Codrington (surname)
- Codrington baronets
- John Codrington Bampfylde (1754 – c. 1796), English poet

== Other uses ==
- HMS Codrington (D65), a Royal Navy A-class destroyer
