= Francis Whitworth =

British politician

Member of Parliament for Minehead
- In office 1723–1742 Serving with Thomas Hales, Alexander Luttrell, Sir William Codrington, Thomas Carew
- Preceded by: Thomas Hales; Robert Mansel
- Succeeded by: Thomas Carew; John Periam

Personal details
- Born: 9 May 1684
- Died: 6 March 1742 (aged 57)
- Spouse: Joan Windham (m. 1720, died)
- Relations: Charles Whitworth, 1st Baron Whitworth (brother); Charles Whitworth, 1st Earl Whitworth (grandson)
- Children: Charles Whitworth
- Parent(s): Richard Whitworth; Anne Mosley
- Education: Westminster School

Francis Whitworth (9 May 1684 – 6 March 1742), of Leybourne, Kent and Blackford, near Minehead, Somerset, was a British politician who sat in the House of Commons from 1723 to 1742.

== Early life ==
Whitworth was the sixth son of Richard Whitworth of Batchacre Park, in Adbaston, Staffordshire and his wife Anne Mosley, daughter of Rev. Francis Mosley of Wilmslow, Cheshire. He was educated at Westminster School in 1701.

== Career ==
Whitworth was appointed to a sinecure post as Secretary for Barbados in 1719. At the 1722 general election he stood for Parliament at Minehead being assured by Lord Carteret that the government would support him. He was defeated in a fierce contest, but when he presented a petition, he was persuaded to withdraw it. He was returned as Member of Parliament for Minehead at a by-election 24 May 1723. In 1724 he acquired the Grange, Castle and Manor of Leybourne in Kent. He retained the Minehead seat in 1727, and when a petition was raised against him the government prevented its being heard. About this time he strengthened his interest by buying an estate of Blackford near Minehead. He also applied for his son to be granted the reversion of the secretary of Barbados, claiming that George I had consented to this but had died before he had signed the warrant. This application was unsuccessful and he retained the post for the rest of his life.

Whitworth made his first recorded Parliamentary speech, in support of the Hessian troops, on 3 February 1731. In 1732 he obtained the post of Surveyor of Woods and Forests North and South of Trent worth £1,000 a year and he held it for the rest of his life. He was active in the interests of his constituents, particularly when they were threatened by commercial competition from Ireland and the colonies. On 12 April 1732 he spoke against a proposal to remove the duty on Irish yarn, and on 10 March 1732 he successfully moved for a bill to stop the free of duty importation of hops from New England into Ireland. He spoke on the Charitable Corporation bill on 15 May 1732; seconded the army vote, and was abused by the mob outside the House on the withdrawal of the Excise Bill. On 10 May 1733 he opposed a petition from the trustees for Georgia for more money.as he was against the enlargement of colonies, and ‘wished New England at the bottom of the sea.’ He was returned unopposed at the 1734 general election. He made his last recorded speeches, in 1734 and 1735, which were concerned with local interests at Minehead. He was returned unopposed in 1741 but was frequently absent, probably on account of illness.

== Personal life ==
Around 1720, he married Joan Windham of Clarewell, Gloucestershire. Together, they were the parents of Charles Whitworth.

Whitworth died on 6 March 1742 leaving one son Charles. He was the younger brother of Charles Whitworth, 1st Baron Whitworth.

Parliament of Great Britain
Preceded by Thomas Hales; Robert Mansel	Member of Parliament for Minehead; 1723–1742; With: Thomas Hales 1723-1727; Alexander Luttrell 1727-1737; Sir William Codrington 1737-1739; Thomas Carew 1739-1742	Succeeded by Thomas Carew; John Periam
