= William Dowdeswell (politician, born 1721) =

British politician (1721–1775)

The Right Honourable William Dowdeswell
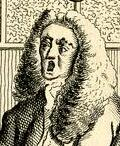
- Caricature of Dowdeswell c. 1765

Chancellor of the Exchequer
- In office 16 July 1765 – 2 August 1766
- Monarch: George III
- Prime Minister: The Marquess of Rockingham
- Preceded by: George Grenville
- Succeeded by: Charles Townshend

Member of Parliament for Worcestershire
- In office 8 April 1761 – 6 February 1775
- Preceded by: John Bulkeley Coventry
- Succeeded by: William Lygon

Member of Parliament for Tewkesbury
- In office 30 June 1747 – 16 April 1754
- Preceded by: John Martin, Sr.
- Succeeded by: John Martin, Jr.

Personal details
- Born: 12 March 1721 Worcestershire, England
- Died: 6 February 1775 (aged 53) Nice, France
- Party: Tory (before 1763); Independent (1763-65); Whig (Rockinghamite) (after 1765)
- Spouse: Bridget Codrington (m. 1747)
- Children: 15 (including William and John Edmund)
- Education: Christ Church, Oxford; University of Leiden

William Dowdeswell PC (12 March 1721 – 6 February 1775) was a British politician who served as Chancellor of the Exchequer and later leader of the Rockinghamite faction in the House of Commons.

== Background and education ==
A son of William Dowdeswell of Pull Court, Bushley, Worcestershire, he was educated at Westminster School, at Christ Church, Oxford, then at the University of Leiden. One of his fellow students was Baron d'Holbach. He spent the summer of 1746 with him at the Heeze-Leende estate of his uncle, Messire François-Adam, Baron d'Holbach, Seigneur de Heeze, Leende et autres Lieux (ca. 1675–1753).

== Political career ==
Dowdeswell became member of Parliament for the family borough of Tewkesbury in 1747, retaining this seat until 1754 when he refused to fight a contested election. During his first term in Parliament Dowdeswell made no mark with only two recorded speeches during that term. Dowdeswell returned to Parliament in 1761 as one of the representatives of Worcestershire. Dowdeswell took a largely independent line in politics before the mid-1760, though his sympathies were generally reckoned to be Tory. Dowdeswell's opposition to Jacobitism and dislike of the militia were both Whiggish sentiments, while his support for the commemoration of Charles I's execution, reduction of government expenditure, reduction in military spending, and lower taxation were all traditionally Tory positions.

Dowdeswell became increasingly active after returning to Parliament in 1761, maintaining the traditional Country opposition line. Dowdeswell was conspicuous in the opposition to the Cider Excise of 1763. With the disintegration of the old Tory party, Dowdeswell's allegiances remained in Opposition, continuing to argue for fiscal restraint while opposing the Grenville ministry over John Wilkes and the general warrants. Dowdeswell maintained an independent line and was not viewed as aligned with either the Whig opposition or the Ministry before 1765. Dowdeswell was surprisingly appointed Chancellor of the Exchequer under the Marquess of Rockingham, and his short tenure of this position appears to have been a successful one, he being in Lecky's words a good financier, but nothing more.

To general astonishment, he refused to abandon his friends and to take office under Chatham, who succeeded Rockingham in August 1766. Dowdeswell then led the Rockinghamite party in the House of Commons, taking an active part in debate until his death. In 1774 during the Parliamentary debate of the Boston Port Act he warned the act will "soon inflame all America, and stir up a contention you will not be able to pacify and quiet".

== Family and death ==
Dowdeswell married Bridget, daughter of Sir William Codrington, 1st Baronet, in 1747. The couple had 15 children, including Charles William Dowdeswell (b. 8 June 1756).

Dowdeswell went abroad to recover his health in 1774 but died the next February in Nice. The highly eulogistic epitaph on his monument at Bushley was written by Edmund Burke.

Parliament of Great Britain
Preceded by The Viscount Gage; John Martin	Member of Parliament for Tewkesbury; 1747–1754; With: The Viscount Gage	Succeeded by Nicolson Calvert; John Martin
Preceded by John Bulkeley Coventry; Edmund Pytts	Member of Parliament for Worcestershire; 1761–1775; With: John Ward 1761–1774; Edward Foley 1774–1775	Succeeded by Edward Foley; William Lygon
Political offices
Preceded by George Grenville	Chancellor of the Exchequer; 1765–1766	Succeeded by Charles Townshend
