= Overbury =

Village in Worcestershire, England

Coordinates: 52.03769°N 2.05973°W

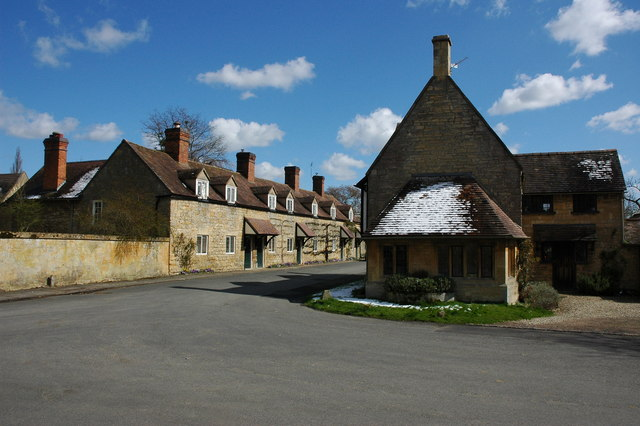
- Cottages in Overbury

- Location within Worcestershire
- Population: 283
- OS grid reference: SO960377
- Civil parish: Overbury
- District: Wychavon
- Shire county: Worcestershire
- Region: West Midlands
- Country: England
- Sovereign state: United Kingdom
- Post town: BREDON
- Postcode district: GL20
- Police: West Mercia
- Fire: Hereford and Worcester
- Ambulance: West Midlands

Overbury is a village and civil parish in Worcestershire, England, midway between Evesham and Tewkesbury south of Bredon Hill.

The name Overbury derives from the Old English ufanburh meaning 'upper fortification'.

The manor of Overbury was purchased by the banking family of Martin in the 18th century from the Parsons family, members of whom also owned neighbouring Kemerton Court. The Martins rebuilt Overbury Court in c.1740, and it is still occupied by their descendants in 2018.

In 2014, Roman skeletons were found at Overbury Primary School when extensions to the school were being built.

== Conderton Camp ==
Conderton Camp, to the north of the village, is a scheduled monument. Kemerton Camp is also on Bredon Hill and is an Iron Age Hill Fort, brought to a "violent end" by the Romans and left abandoned for most of the Romano-British period.

== Sources ==
- Thomas, Nicholas (2005). Conderton Camp, Worcestershire: A Small Middle Iron Age Hillfort on Bredon Hill. CBA Research Reports. Vol. 143 (Illustrated ed.). Council for British Archaeology. ISBN 9781902771502.
