= Portrait of Edward Codrington =

1828 painting by Thomas Lawrence

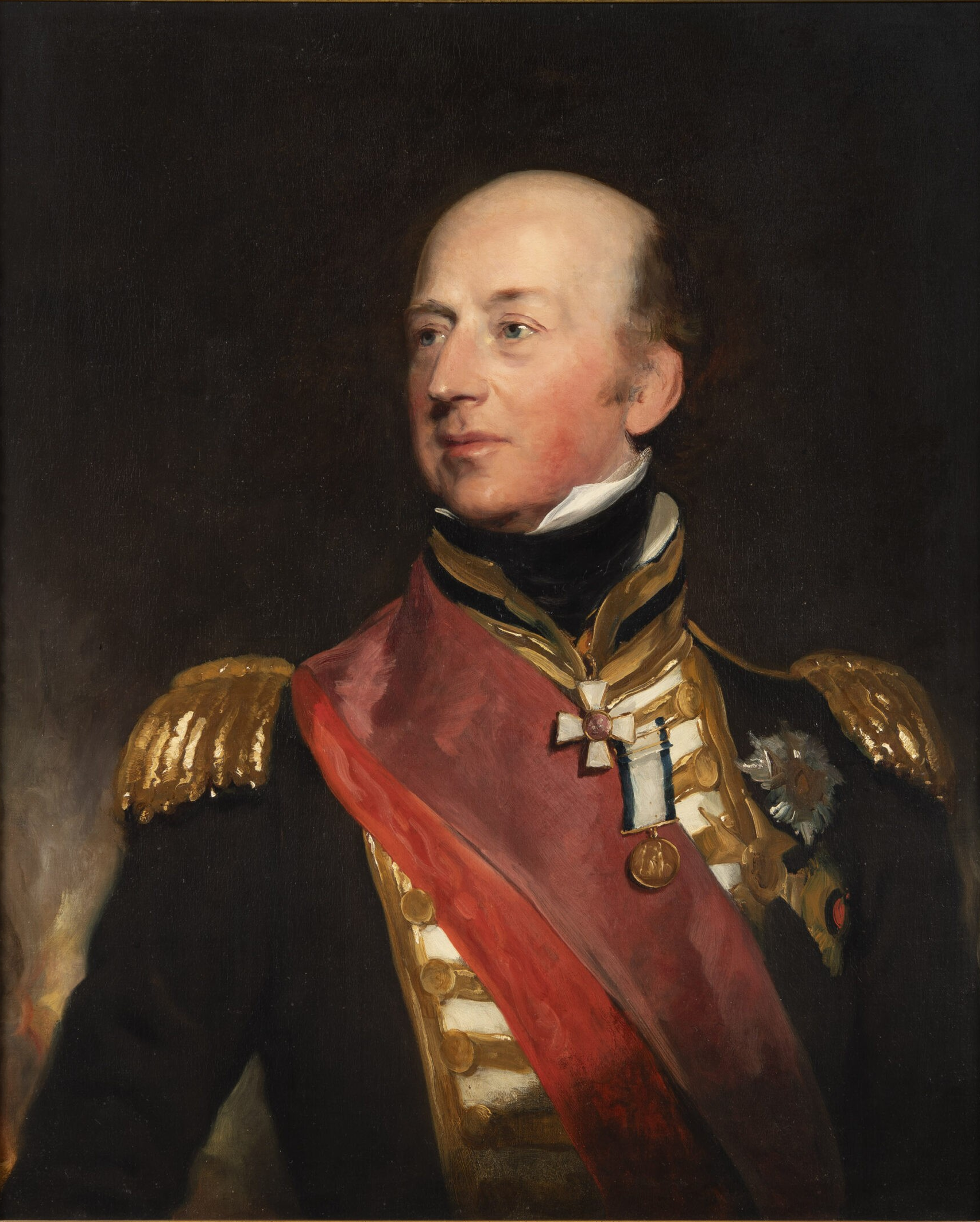
- Artist: Thomas Lawrence
- Year: c.1828
- Type: Oil on canvas, portrait painting
- Dimensions: 76.2 cm × 63.5 cm (30.0 in × 25.0 in)
- Location: Philhellenism Museum, Athens

Portrait of Edward Codrington is an 1828 portrait painting by the British artist Thomas Lawrence. It depicts Admiral Sir Edward Codrington of the Royal Navy. Codrington had served throughout the French Revolutionary and Napoleonic Wars, participating in notable engagements such as the Glorious First of June and the Battle of Trafalgar. However, he became best known for his command of the combined allied fleet of Britain, France and Russia during the Greek War of Independence. Moving to head off a potential massacre of Greek inhabitants by the Ottoman Empire's Egyptian auxiliaries, Codrington fought and defeated the Ottoman fleet at the Battle of Navarino on 20 October 1827. The action was popular in the three allies nations and Codrington returned home a public hero.

Codrington is depicted wearing a number of decorations including the Russian Order of Saint George and the French Order of Saint Louis. The engraver Charles Turner produced a mezzotint based on the portrait in 1830. Lawrence was the leading portraitist of the Regency era and was the President of the Royal Academy from 1820. After Lawrence's death in 1830 the portrait was displayed posthumously at the British Institution's annual exhibition in Pall Mall. The painting was auctioned in 2025 and acquired by Philhellenism Museum in Athens.

== Bibliography ==
- Levey, Michael. Sir Thomas Lawrence. Yale University Press, 2005.
- Ormond, Richard. Early Victorian Portraits, National Portrait Gallery, 1974.
- Warner, Oliver. The Glorious First of June. Macmillan, 1961
