= Chapman baronets of London (1720) =

Escutcheon of the Chapman baronets of London

The Chapman baronetcy, of London, was created in the Baronetage of Great Britain on 27 June 1720 for Sir William Chapman, a Director of the South Sea Company. His elder son, the 2nd Baronet, represented Taunton in the House of Commons. He was childless and was succeeded by his younger brother, the 3rd Baronet. He also had no children and on his death in 1785 the title became extinct.

== Chapman baronets, of London (1720) ==
- Sir William Chapman, 1st Baronet (c. 1670–1737)
- Sir John Chapman, 2nd Baronet (c. 1710–1781)
- Sir William Chapman, 3rd Baronet (1714–1785)

== Notes ==
Baronetage of Great Britain
Preceded by Colby baronets	Chapman baronets of London; 27 June 1720	Succeeded by Sanderson baronets
