= Sir William Codrington, 2nd Baronet =

English politician

Sir William Codrington, 2nd Baronet (1719–1792) was an English politician who sat in the House of Commons between 1747 and 1792.

Codrington was the eldest son of Sir William Codrington, 1st Baronet of Dodington Park and his wife Elizabeth Bethall and was born on 26 October 1719. He was educated at Westminster School and University College, Oxford. He married Anne Acton of Fulham, Middlesex on 22 February 1736. He succeeded his father in the baronetcy in 1738 and inherited large plantations in the West Indies at Barbuda and Betty's Hope.

Codrington was elected Member of Parliament for Beverley in 1747 and was re-elected in 1755. In 1761 he stood as MP for Tewkesbury, and was re-elected in the elections of 1768, 1774, 1780 1784 and 1790. He is only recorded as speaking in Parliament once which was on the game bill on 29 March 1762.

Codrington died on 11 March 1792 and was succeeded by his son Sir William Codrington, 3rd Baronet. However he disinherited his son, Sir William and bequeathed his estates to his nephew Christopher Bethell-Codrington.

== Sources ==
- Kidd, Charles & Williamson, David (editors). Debrett's Peerage and Baronetage (1990 edition). New York: St Martin's Press, 1990.
- Leigh Rayment's list of baronets

Parliament of Great Britain
Preceded by Charles Pelham; William Strickland	Member of Parliament for Beverley; 1747–1761; With: Charles Pelham 1747–1761; John Tufnell 1754–1761	Succeeded by Michael Newton; George Tufnell
Preceded by John Martin; Nicolson Calvert	Member of Parliament for Tewkesbury; 1761–1792; With: Nicolson Calvert 1761–1774; Joseph Martin 1774–1776; James Martin 1776–1792	Succeeded by Lt-Col William Dowdeswell; James Martin
Baronetage of Great Britain
Preceded by William Codrington	Baronet (of Donington); 1738–1792	Succeeded by William Codrington
