= Nicolson Calvert (died 1793) =

English politician

Nicolson Calvert (c. 1724 – 4 May 1793) was an English politician.

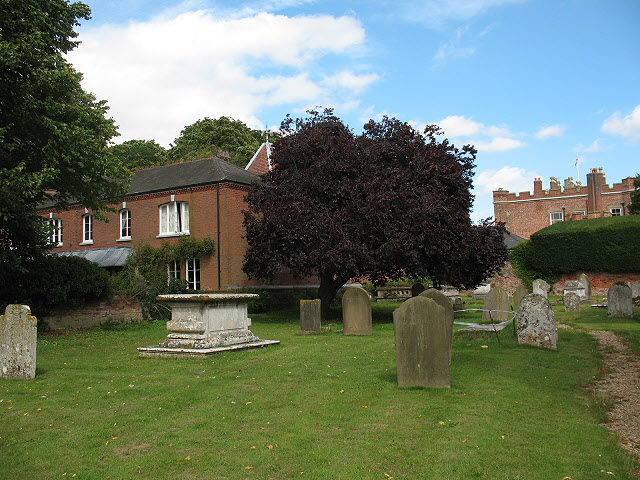
Hunsdon House, as rebuilt 1805

He was the oldest surviving son of Felix Calvert of Furneaux Pelham in Hertfordshire. His mother Christian was the daughter of Josiah Nicolson, a brewer from Clapham. He was educated at Bury St Edmunds Grammar School and at Trinity College, Cambridge.

He owned Hunsdon House in Hertfordshire, which he inherited from his grandfather Felix Calvert.

He was a Member of Parliament (MP) for the borough of Tewkesbury from 1754 to 1774.

He married Rebecca, the daughter of the Rev. John Goodwin, rector of Clapham, Surrey, but had no children. They lived at Hunsdon House, which his widow rebuilt after his death.

Parliament of Great Britain
| Preceded by The Viscount Gage; William Dowdeswell | Member of Parliament for Tewkesbury; 1754–1774; With: John Martin 1754–61; Sir William Codrington, Bt from 1761 | Succeeded by Sir William Codrington, Bt; Joseph Martin |
