= H. W. Codrington =

British financial administrator (1876–1942)

Humphry William Codrington (11 November 1876 – 7 November 1942) was a British colonial financial administrator. Codrington was a notable scholar in history, numismatics and inscriptions of Ceylon and was referred to by Dr Senerath Paranavitana as the foremost writer on Ceylon numismatics.

Born the eldest son of Rear Admiral William Codrington and the Honorable Mrs Codrington, he was educated at Winchester College and New College, Oxford. Having passed the colonial civil service examination he was posted to Ceylon in 1903 as a cadet in the Ceylon Civil Service. He served in Kalutara, Anuradhapura, Badulla and Nuwara Eliya, Kandy and retired in 1932 while serving as the Government Agent of the Central Province. He served in France during World War I and as a Air Raid Warden in during the Blitz in World War II.

His publications include:

- Catalogue on Coins in the Colombo Museum - 1904
- Ceylon Coins and Currency - 1924
- Diary of Sir John D'Oyly - 1917
- A Short History of Ceylon - 1926

He married Joyce Mary Bleaden in 1919 and had a daughter and two sons. H. W. Codrington died in London on 7 November 1942.
