= Thomas Codrington (priest) =

English Roman Catholic theologian

Thomas Codrington (died 1691?) was an English Roman Catholic theologian. He is chiefly known for his attempt to introduce into England the "Institute of Secular Priests Living in Community", founded in Bavaria by Bartholomaus Holzhauser.

== Life ==
Codrington was educated and ordained at Douai, where he taught humanities for a time. Later on he lived with Cardinal Howard at Rome, acting as his chaplain and secretary. He returned to England in July, 1684, and on the accession of James II of England in the following year, he was appointed one of the royal chaplains and preachers in ordinary.

While he was in Rome he had joined the institute above mentioned, in which Cardinal Howard took a great personal interest, and his return to England seemed to the superior, Stephen Hofer, a favourable opportunity for extending the institute. Accordingly Codrington and his companion, John Morgan, were appointed procurators to introduce the institute into England. The object of the society, the constitutions of which had been approved by Pope Innocent XI in 1680, was to encourage community life among the secular clergy. This was to be attained by priests residing together, and doing their work from a common centre, all being subject to the bishop. In this work he received much assistance from Cardinal Howard, who addressed letters both to the secular clergy and to the dean of the chapter, exhorting all English priests to join the institute. Even before leaving Rome he had been active in propagating the institute, and had, with his colleagues, endeavoured not only to introduce it into all the English colleges abroad, but even to make it obligatory on the superiors by a decree.

Some progress was in fact made, but before much could be effected the Glorious Revolution took place, and in 1688 James II fled from England. Codrington followed his patron abroad to Saint-Germain, where he continued to act as chaplain until his death, which took place about 1691.

For some years efforts were made to spread the institute in England, and in 1697 special constitutions, designed to meet the peculiar circumstances of English priests, were published with a preface, which shows that several of the leading missionaries had joined it. The Old Chapter, however, were unrelenting, on the ground that it was unsuitable in England and would lead to dissentions among the clergy, and ultimately Bishop Bonaventure Giffard suppressed it.

== Works ==
- A Sermon preach'd before their Majesties, in St. James's, on Advent Sunday, November 28, 1686.
- A Sermon preach'd before the Queen-Dowager, in her Majesty's Chapel at Somerset-house, on Quinquagesima Sunday, February 6, 1686-7. Being also the anniversary-day of his late Majesty, King Charles the II, of blessed memory, London, 1687.

Both sermons were reprinted in A Select Collection of Catholick Sermons, vol. i. London, 1741.
