= Kenneth de Burgh Codrington =

British archaeologist (1899–1986)

Professor Kenneth de Burgh Codrington
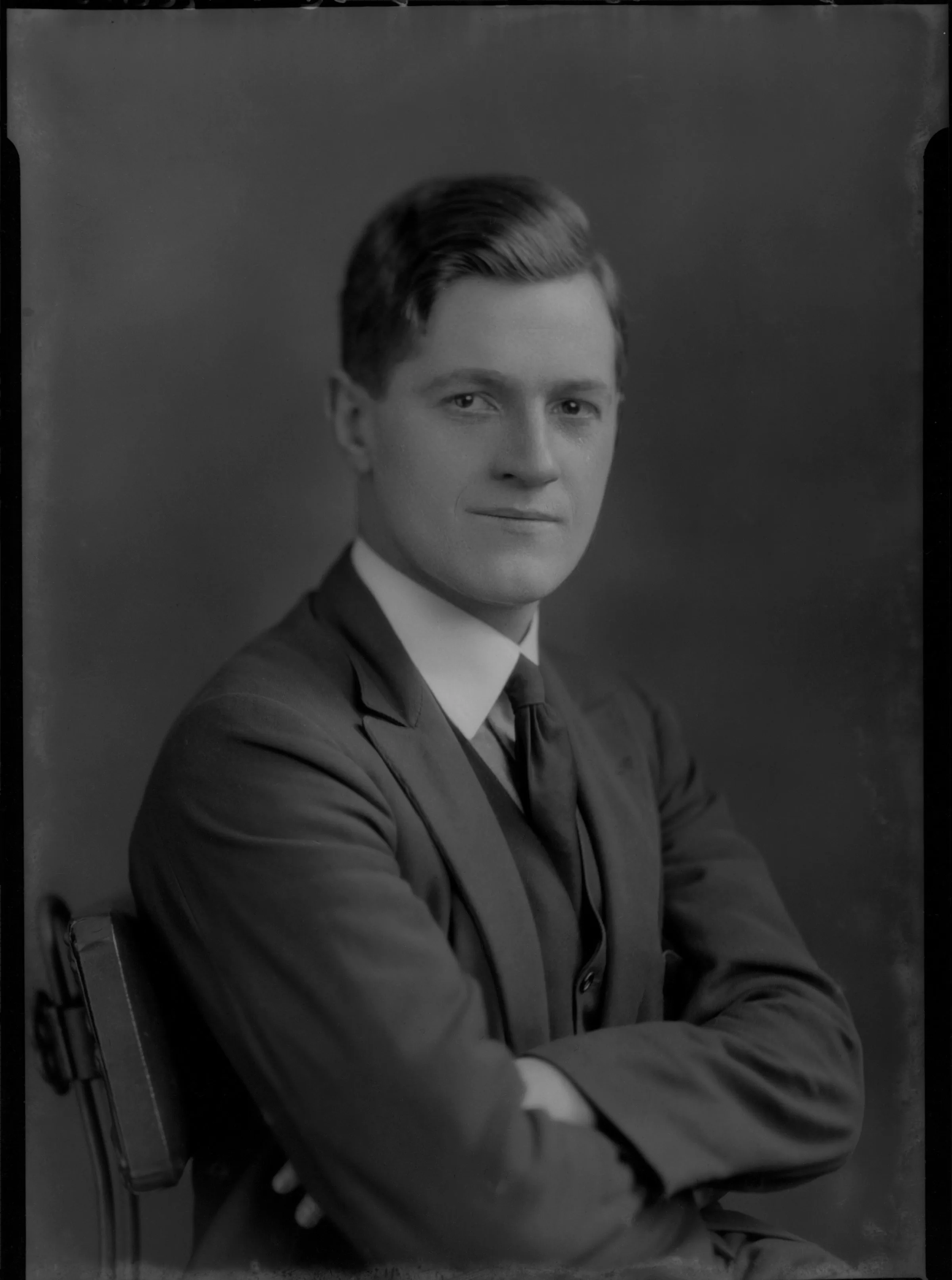
- Codrington in 1927
- Born: 5 June 1899; India
- Died: 1 January 1986 (aged 86)
- Spouses: Elizabeth Gill (m. 1921; div. 1927) Philippa Christine (m. 1927)

Academic background
- Education: Sherbane School and Cadet College, Wellington, India; Corpus Christi College, Cambridge (BA) Wadham College, Oxford (MA)

Kenneth de Burgh Codrington (5 June 1899 – 1 January 1986) was a British archaeologist and art historian of India who was Keeper of the Indian Section of the Victoria and Albert Museum (1935–1948) and Professor of Indian Archaeology at the University of London (1948–1966).

== Background ==
Born in India on 5 June 1899, Codrington grew up in the North-West Frontier. He was educated at Sherborne School and Cadet College, Wellington, India; Corpus Christi College, Cambridge; and Wadham College, Oxford. He joined the Indian Army in 1917, but was invalided in 1921. He married Elizabeth Gill in 1921, and after divorce, married Philippa Christine in 1927. He then turned to an academic career. He died on 1 January 1986.

== Academic and archaeological career ==
Codrington earned a BA in 1921 and an MA in 1926. He was Professor of Archaeology and Fellow of the Graduate School at the University of Cincinnati 1925–26. From 1931, he was an Honorary Lecturer at University College and S.O.A.S. in the University of London, and from 1948 he was Professor of Indian Archaeology until his retirement in 1966. From 1935 to 1948 he was also Keeper of the Indian Section of the Victoria and Albert Museum. He was on an archaeological mission in Afghanistan between 1940 and 1942 (also working for British intelligence), and was at the excavations led by Joseph Hackin in Begram in 1940. In 1972 Codrington directed the excavations at Anuradhapura, Sri Lanka.

== Furniture controversy ==
In the mid-1930s he was involved in a heated controversy, denying the claim that much 17th-century furniture hitherto regarded as Dutch or English was in fact made in India. This position was given in papers by the Danish curator Poul Fritz Vilhelm Slomann in The Burlington Magazine: "The Indian Period of European Furniture-I" (September 1934, Vol. 65, pp. 112–126), followed by parts II and III in the October and November issues. These concluded that

For all practical purposes I believe to be safe to consider all laquer work found in Europe and dating from about 1600 and fairly far on in the century as having come from India, or from China and Japan.

Codrington responded, joining with Ralph Edwards, a furniture historian, from 1937 Keeper of Woodwork at the V&A, and the exchanges continued into the next year. On the whole, subsequent scholarship has agreed with Codrington and Edwards.

== Publications ==
- Ancient India from the earliest times to the Guptas with notes on the architecture and sculpture of the mediæval period (1926)
- An Introduction to the Study of Medieval Indian Sculpture (1929)
- An Introduction to the Study of Islamic Art of India (1934)
- The Study of Indian Art (1988)
- The Woods of the Image (1934)
- "Museum Registration" (1928) – Science Museum: Typescript of Codrington's views on the responsibilities of officers for the "selection, purchase or acceptance, registration, description and care of objects"
- "Visit to Afghanistan" (1941–1943) – The National Archives, Kew (ref: ED 23/763)
