= Cust baronets of Leasowe Castle (1876) =

Escutcheon of the Cust baronets of Leasowe Castle

The Cust baronetcy, of Leasowe Castle in the County of Chester, was created in the Baronetage of the United Kingdom on 26 February 1876 for Sir Edward Cust. He was the younger son of Brownlow Cust, 1st Baron Brownlow, and had earlier represented Grantham, from 1818 to 1826, and Lostwithiel from 1826 to 1832, in the House of Commons.

The title became extinct on the death of the 1st Baronet's grandson, the 3rd Baronet, in 1931.

== Cust baronets, of Leasowe Castle (1876) ==
- Sir Edward Cust, Kt., KCH, 1st Baronet (1794–1878)
- Sir Leopold Cust, 2nd Baronet (1831–1878)
- Sir Charles Leopold Cust, 3rd Baronet (1864–1931), died leaving no heir.

== Notes ==
Baronetage of the United Kingdom
| Preceded by Codrington baronets | Cust baronets of Leasowe Castle; 26 February 1876 | Succeeded by Frere baronets |
