= Wilfred Codrington =

American lawyer

- Born: March 6, 1983 (age 43)

Academic background
- Education: Brown University (AB); University of Pennsylvania (MPA); Stanford University (JD)

Academic work
- Discipline: Law
- Sub-discipline: Election law Voting rights Constitutional history Constitutional law
- Institutions: Cardozo Law School; New York University

Wilfred U. Codrington III (born March 6, 1983) is an American legal scholar who is the Walter Floersheimer Professor of Constitutional Law and co-director of the Floersheimer Center for Constitutional Democracy at Cardozo Law School and a fellow at the Brennan Center for Justice. A specialist in constitution law, election law, and voting rights, Codrington is a regular contributor to The Atlantic.

== Education ==
Codrington earned a Bachelor of Arts degree from Brown University, a Master of Public Administration from the University of Pennsylvania, and a Juris Doctor from Stanford Law School.

== Career ==
Codrington served as a law clerk for Judge Deborah Batts. He also worked as a legislative assistant and counsel in the office of Congresswoman Eleanor Holmes Norton. After graduating from law school, he worked as an associate attorney at DLA Piper. Codrington was the Bernard and Anne Spitzer Fellow at the Brennan Center for Justice. He also worked as a professor in the Robert F. Wagner Graduate School of Public Service. He later joined Brooklyn Law School. Codrington writes about election reform and voting rights for The Atlantic. In 2021, Codrington co-authored, with John F. Kowal, The People’s Constitution. Codrington has also been featured as a guest on KDNK.
