= Christopher Bethell-Codrington =

British politician and cricketer

Member of Parliament for Tewkesbury
- In office 1801–1812 Serving with James Martin, Charles Hanbury-Tracy
- Preceded by: Parliament of Great Britain
- Succeeded by: John Edmund Dowdeswell; John Martin

Member of Parliament for Tewkesbury
- In office 1797–1800 Serving with James Martin
- Preceded by: William Dowdeswell; James Martin
- Succeeded by: Parliament of the United Kingdom

Personal details
- Born: Christopher Codrington; October 1764
- Died: 4 February 1843 (aged 78)
- Party: Tory
- Spouse: Hon. Caroline Georgina Harriet Foley (after 1796)
- Relations: Sir William Codrington, 1st Baronet (grandfather); Edward Codrington (brother)
- Parent(s): Edward Codrington; Rebecca le Sturgeon

Christopher Bethell-Codrington (born Christopher Codrington; October 1764 – 4 February 1843) was a British politician and cricketer.

== Early life ==
Christopher Codrington was born in October 1764 to Edward Codrington and Rebecca (née le Sturgeon) Codrington. His paternal grandparents were Sir William Codrington, 1st Baronet and Elizabeth Bethell. Among his siblings was Admiral Sir Edward Codrington.

In 1792, he inherited from his uncle Sir William Codrington, 2nd Baronet, sugar plantations in Antigua and the Dodington Park estate in Gloucestershire. In 1797 he inherited further Caribbean property from his uncle Christopher Bethell, who had changed his name after inheriting the estates from his maternal uncle Slingsby Bethell in 1758. He then changed his surname to Bethell-Codrington.

=== Cricket career ===
He was mainly associated with Marylebone Cricket Club (MCC) and made five known appearances in important matches in 1797.

== Career ==
In 1797 he was elected as a Tory Member of Parliament (MP) for Tewkesbury, holding the seat until 1812.

In 1806 he rejected pressure from his constituents to support the abolition of the slave trade, but denied being motivated by his self-interest as a plantation-owner. Later in 1832, he had a very public debate in the newspapers with Sir Fowell Buxton on abolition, quoting a letter from his attorney and resident manager for Barbuda in 1825, John James, detailing the supposed contentedness of the slaves there.

In 1817, he purchased further lands at Wapley in Gloucestershire, which made his estate "extend upwards of 15 miles in one continued line".

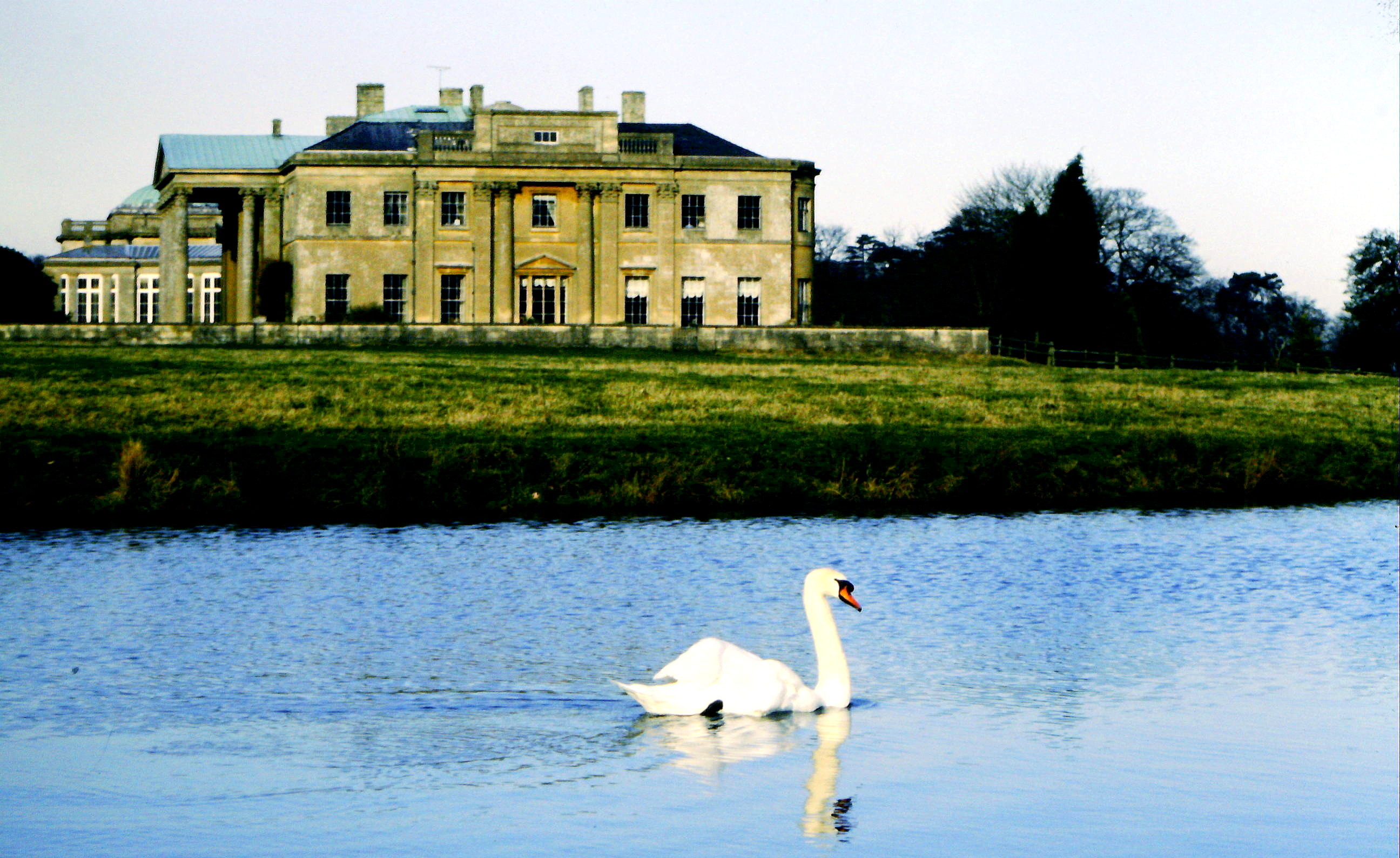
Dodington Park designed by James Wyatt between 1798 and 1816.

=== Caribbean estates ===
Christopher Bethell-Codrington's sugar estates included Betty's Hope, Clare Hall, Garden, Cotton, New Work, Bolans, and Jennings, on the island of Antigua and also the island of Barbuda which was used to supply the sugar estates with provisions and also earned commissions by salvaging the many ship wrecks on its reefs. These estates were managed by resident managers and attorneys. Many of their letters back to Christopher Bethell-Codrington at Dodington Park still exist and are available to read on microfilm and PDF in a collection known as the Codrington Papers. In the 1830s, the British government emancipated the slaves, and Bethell-Codrington was compensated over £30,000 for nearly 500 slaves in his ownership.

== Personal life ==
On 16 August 1796, he married Hon. Caroline Georgina Harriet Foley, a daughter of Thomas Foley, 2nd Baron Foley of Kidderminster and Lady Henrietta Stanhope (fourth daughter of William Stanhope, 2nd Earl of Harrington and the former Lady Caroline FitzRoy). (Note: Lady Caroline FitzRoy was the eldest daughter of Charles FitzRoy, 2nd Duke of Grafton, the only child and heir of Henry FitzRoy, 1st Duke of Grafton (an illegitimate son of King Charles II by his mistress Barbara Villiers) by his wife Isabella Bennet, 2nd Countess of Arlington, a great-granddaughter of William the Silent.) Together, they were the parents of:

- Charlotte Octavia Bethell-Codrington (d. 1895), who married Henry Lannoy Hunter, son of Henry Lannoy Hunter, in 1833.
- Emma Bethell-Codrington (d. 1884), who married John Harvey Lovell in 1843.
- Caroline Anna Maria Bethell-Codrington (c. 1798–1877), who married Hon. Arthur Thellusson, son of Peter Thellusson, 1st Baron Rendlesham and Elizabeth Eleanor Cornwall, in 1826.
- Georgina Elizabeth Bethell-Codrington (c. 1799–1866), who married Sir Henry Peyton, 3rd Baronet, son of Sir Henry Peyton, 2nd Baronet, in 1828.
- Christopher William Bethell-Codrington (1805–1864), MP for East Gloucester; he married Lady Georgiana Somerset, daughter of Henry Somerset, 7th Duke of Beaufort and Georgiana Fitzroy, in 1836.
- Edward Bethell-Codrington (1813–1870), who married Jane Brown White, daughter of William White, in 1863.

Bethell-Codrington died on 3 February 1843.

Parliament of Great Britain
Preceded by William Dowdeswell; James Martin	Member of Parliament for Tewkesbury; 1797–1800; With: James Martin	Succeeded by Parliament of the United Kingdom
Parliament of the United Kingdom
Preceded by Parliament of Great Britain	Member of Parliament for Tewkesbury; 1801–12; With: James Martin to 1807; Charles Hanbury-Tracy 1807–12	Succeeded by John Edmund Dowdeswell; John Martin
