= Dodington, Gloucestershire =

Village in Gloucestershire, England

Coordinates: 51.5186°N 2.36225°W

Dodington
- Location within Gloucestershire
- Population: 8,206 (2011)
- OS grid reference: ST752798
- Unitary authority: South Gloucestershire
- Ceremonial county: Gloucestershire
- Region: South West
- Country: England
- Sovereign state: United Kingdom
- Post town: Bristol
- Postcode district: BS37
- Police: Avon and Somerset
- Fire: Avon
- Ambulance: South Western
- UK Parliament: Thornbury and Yate

Dodington is a village and civil parish in South Gloucestershire, England. The village lies in a small, fertile valley between Codrington and Old Sodbury, and runs together with the even tinier hamlet of Coombes End. It is about 2.5 miles southeast of Chipping Sodbury and four miles from Yate railway station.

The River Frome rises within Dodington Park, the estate that originally formed the economic basis of this small village. The Cotswold Way also passes through the north end of the village. The River Boyd rises just south of the village.

In addition to the rural area around the village, the parish nowadays encompasses substantial housing areas to the south of Yate and Chipping Sodbury, the latter being the location of Dodington Parish Hall.

== Governance ==
An electoral ward in the same name exists, but only covers housing estates in south Yate. Other northern parts of the parish are in the electoral ward of Chipping Sodbury, while Dodington village and the surrounding rural area are in Westerleigh ward.

== History ==
Numerous Roman remains, including part of a villa, have been found in the parish. Dodington is mentioned in the Domesday Book of 1086. The village has grown little since then, having a postbox and a road junction, but no shops and no phone box.

== Notable residents ==
- Admiral Sir Edward Codrington GCB RN, hero of the Battle of Trafalgar in 1805 and the Battle of Navarino in 1827, was born here.
- James Dyson, inventor of the Dyson cyclonic separation vacuum cleaner, bought Dodington Park in 2003.

== Sport ==
Dodington football club was formed in 2011 and play in the Bristol & Avon Premier League, which resides at tier 21 of the English Football League. As Dodington has no football pitch facilities, Dodington FC play their home matches outside the parish, in Yate.
