= Overbury Court =

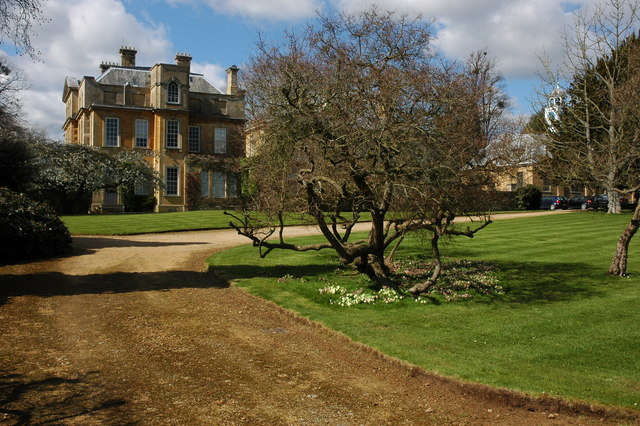

- Location within Worcestershire

General information
- Type: Country house
- Architectural style: Georgian
- Location: Overbury, Worcestershire, England
- Coordinates: 52°02′09″N 2°03′53″W
- Completed: c.1740

Overbury Court is a Georgian style country house in Overbury, Worcestershire, England. It is a privately owned Grade II* listed building.

It is built in two storeys of golden limestone ashlar with a hipped Welsh slate roof behind tall parapets and with large ashlar ridge stacks. An additional attic storey is of a darker stone and incorporated into the parapet. The front facade has 7 bays, of which the 2 central bays break forward and are surmounted by a pediment.

The surrounding parkland comprises a linear belt of land some 2.5km by 0.75km and is Grade II* listed in its own right.

== History ==
Overbury manor was bought in 1723 from the Parsons family by John Martin of the Martins Bank banking family. The existing Elizabethan manor house burnt down in 1738 after which Martin commissioned the building of the present house in a Georgian style, which was completed c.1740.

The house has passed down in the Martin family to the present day (2018). However, since the Rev. Frederick Holland, Vicar of Evesham, married into the family the surname of this branch of the family has been Holland-Martin.

Several members of the Overbury Martins have been Members of Parliament for the local constituency of Tewkesbury and two have been High Sheriffs of Worcestershire. Sir Richard Martin was created a baronet in 1905.
