= Dodington Park =

Country house in Gloucestershire, England

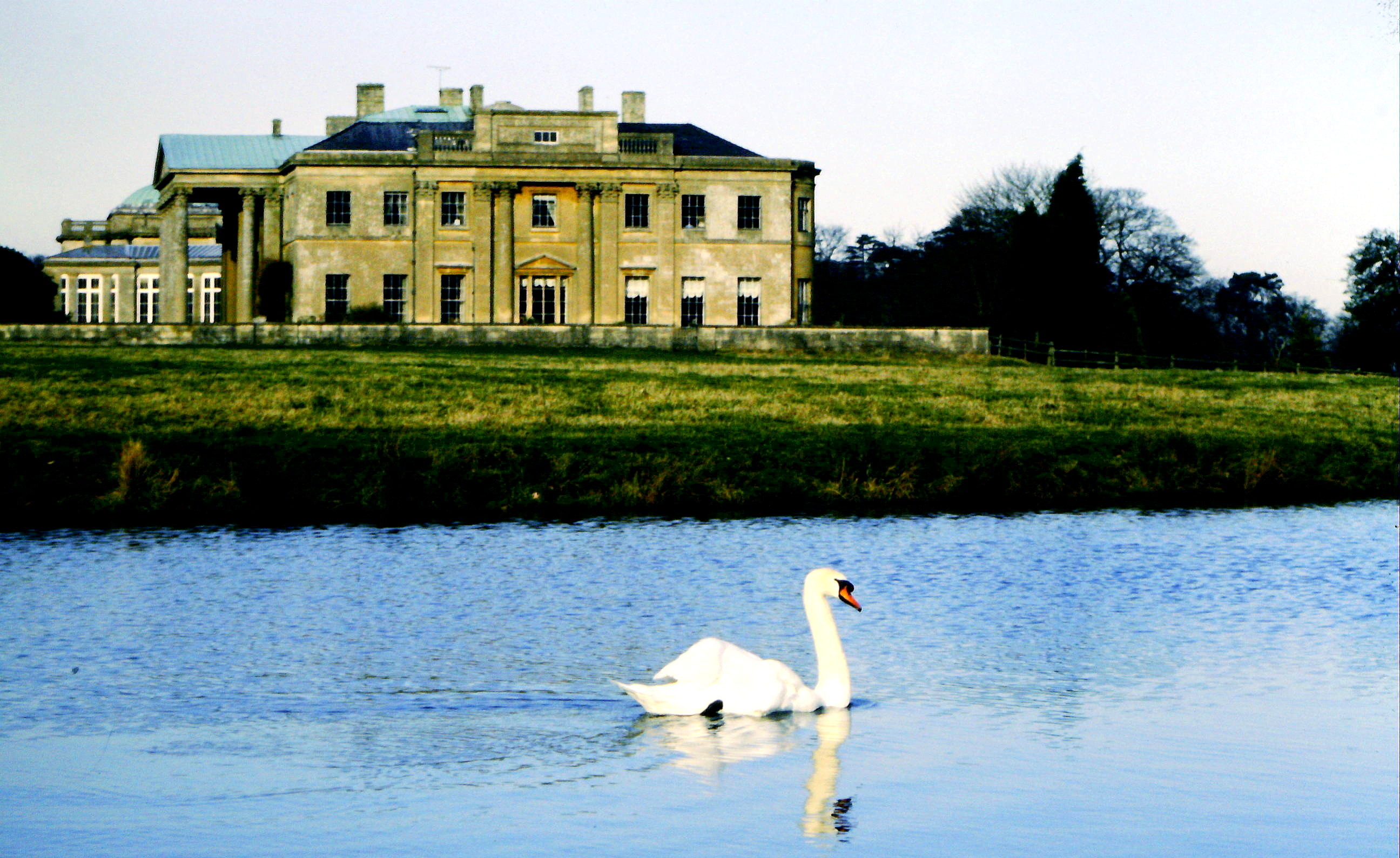
- Dodington House

- Location in Gloucestershire
- 51°31′01.5″N 02°21′29″W
- Location: Dodington, Gloucestershire, England

Dodington Park is a country house and estate in Dodington, South Gloucestershire, England. The house was built by James Wyatt for Christopher Bethell Codrington (of the Codrington baronets). The family had made their fortune from sugar plantations in the Caribbean. It remained in the Codrington family until 1980; it is now owned by British businessman James Dyson.

The estate comprises some 300 acres (120 ha) of landscaped park with woods, lakes, lodges, a dower house, an orangery, a church, and a walled kitchen garden. Formal gardens adjoin the main house. The house is Grade I listed on the National Heritage List for England and the landscaped park is Grade II* listed on the Register of Historic Parks and Gardens. The dower house, orangery, and St Mary's Church which all adjoin the house are also each individually Grade I listed, as is the Bath lodge at the southern part of the estate.

The wall, railings and gate piers near the Bath lodge are listed Grade II. Chippenham Lodge and its terrace walls and the northern gateway to Dodington Park are listed Grade II*. The gates and walls surrounding the kitchen garden toward the north of the park are listed Grade II, as are the Garden Cottage.

== Location ==
Dodington Park is in the parish of Dodington in South Gloucestershire in South West England. The village of Dodington adjoins the western entrance of the estate, which is set on the western edge of the southern Cotswolds. The eastern boundary of the estate is the A46 road, which connects Bath to Stroud, with the northern boundaries bordered by the A432 road from Chippenham to Sodbury. A lane connecting Dodington village to the A46 forms the southern boundary of the estate.

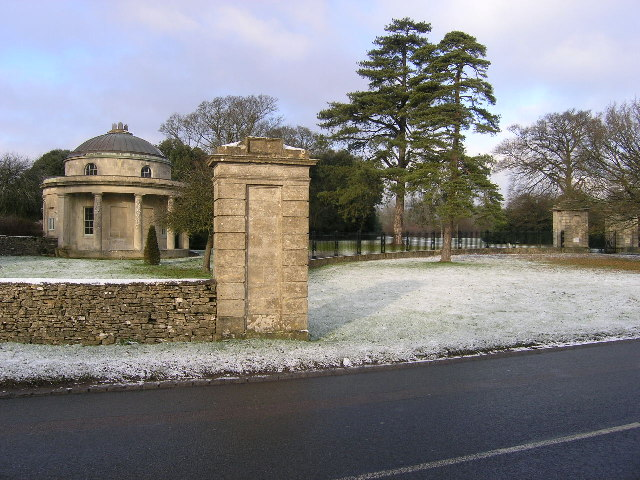
Bath Lodge at the southern entrance to Dodington Park

== History ==
The Codrington family acquired the Dodington estate in the late 16th century, when it was home to a large gabled Elizabethan house and adjoining church. In the 18th century the family became extremely wealthy from their sugar plantations in the British West Indies (see History of the British West Indies) and expanded and developed the estate. The grounds of 240 ha were laid out around 1764 by Capability Brown and were modified in 1793 by William Emes and John Webb.

The main house was built by James Wyatt between 1798 and 1816 for Christopher Bethell Codrington. It is built in the Roman classical style from Bath stone and has a slate roof. Each facade is different, the south front having seven bays separated by Corinthian pilasters. From the north-west corner of the house, a curving conservatory acts as a covered approach to the church, which was also rebuilt by Wyatt. A formal garden was added in 1930. The interior of the house features decorative plasterwork by Francis Bernasconi.

The house was listed as being 52,000 square feet (4,800 m^{2}) in size at the time of its 2003 sale.

A curved orangery with a black and white stone floor adjoins the west of the house, to which it is directly accessed by glass doors. The 1999 Gloucestershire 1: The Cotswolds edition of the Pevsner Architectural Guides, described the placing of the curved orangery in relation to St Mary's church as a "perfect example of Regency picturesque".

The church of St Mary adjoining the house is listed Grade I. The Fishing Lodge, listed Grade II, is to the north west of the house. The bridges to the south and the north of the lodge are both Grade II listed, as are the wall and piers to the west of the Fishing Lodge.

The walls on the bridge and tunnel entries to the north west of the house are listed Grade II. The lodge to the north west of the house is listed Grade II, as are its gate piers and their gates.

The stables are listed Grade I, and a barn to the north of the stables is listed Grade II.

The walls, piers, and bridge to the west of St Mary's churchyard entrance are listed Grade II, as are the walls and railings and gates attached to the West of the church.

The Summer House to the south of the Dower House is listed Grade II. The Cascade Building at the eastern end of the lake is listed Grade II*. The ornamental pigeon loft to the east of the cascade building is listed Grade II.

In the formal gardens to the east of the house, a pair of pedestals and urns are listed Grade II, as are an urn and pedestal to the west of the house. The garden ornaments on the south of the house are listed Grade II as is the balustrade to the west.

Betteshanger School moved to Dodington Park for the duration of the Second World War. Dodington Park was opened to the public in the 1950s due to the increasing financial pressures on the Codrington family of maintaining the estate. The Times listed the house as open from 1 May to 30 September in the summer of 1955 with entry costing 2s and 6d. The house received financial grants for maintenance from the Ministry of Works in 1955.

An adventure playground for children, a carriage museum and a narrow-gauge railway had been built on the site to attract visitors by the 1970s. The local council denied planning permission to build a pleasure park in 1982, with the decision costing the immediate loss of 20 staff. In the wake of the decision, Sir Simon Codrington said that "Every generation of Codringtons since the sixteenth century has fought tooth and nail to keep the estate" with Sir Simon and his wife being reduced to occupying only a single bedroom and kitchen in the house with an electric fire for heating.

The estate was put up for sale in October 1983 by estate agents John D. Wood and had sold by the following February at undisclosed price, with offers over £1 million having been sought previously. The Codrington archives which documented three generations of the family and their relationship with agriculture and slavery in the West Indies for two centuries were sold in the late 1970s. Dodington Park was the subject of the final episode of the 1981 BBC 2 series Arthur Negus Enjoys in which Arthur Negus and architectural historian John Martin Robinson visited the house.

== Post Codrington ==
Dodington Park was sold in 1993 to Michael Percival Kent, a Bath-based residential homes and commercial developer, for a negotiated price believed to be around £800,000.

It was subsequently bought in 2003 by the British inventor and businessman James Dyson for a price believed to be £20 million. The estate was believed to be 300 acres at the time of the 2003 sale. Dyson constructed a swimming pool beneath the Orangery without planning permission in 2011. The existence of the pool was subsequently revealed to South Gloucestershire planning officers in 2015 after a tip off. Dyson was forced retrospectively to apply for planning permission, which was granted in October 2016.
