= William Codrington (Royal Navy officer) =

Rear-Admiral William Codrington CB
- Born: 21 February 1832
- Died: 29 July 1888 (aged 56)
- Military career
- Allegiance: United Kingdom
- Branch: Royal Navy
- Rank: Rear-Admiral
- Commands: HMS Narcissus; HMS Lord Warden; HMS Hercules
- Awards: Companion of the Order of the Bath

Rear-Admiral William Codrington CB (21 February 1832 – 29 July 1888) was a Royal Navy officer who went on to be Junior Naval Lord.

== Naval career ==
Codrington appointed a lieutenant in the Royal Navy in 1855. Promoted to captain in 1869, he was given command of HMS Narcissus, HMS Lord Warden and then HMS Hercules. He was appointed Private Secretary to the First Lord of the Admiralty in 1876 and Captain of the Steam Reserve at Portsmouth in 1880. He went on to be Captain of the Gunnery School at Portsmouth in 1881, Director of Naval Ordnance in 1882, Captain-superintendent of Sheerness Dockyard in 1883 and Junior Naval Lord in 1885. His last appointment was as Admiral-Superintendent of Chatham Dockyard in 1886.

== Family ==
In 1879 he married Mary Auber Leach. His eldest son was H. W. Codrington.

Military offices
Preceded by Sir William Hewett	Junior Naval Lord; 1885–1886	Succeeded by Sir James Erskine
