= Sir William Codrington, 1st Baronet =

British landowner and politician

Sir William Codrington, 1st Baronet (died 1738), of Dodington Park, Gloucestershire, was a British landowner and politician who sat in the House of Commons from 1737 to 1738.

Codrington was the eldest son of John Codrington of Barbados and his wife Sarah Bates, daughter of Colonel William Bates of Barbados. He succeeded his father in 1702 and in 1710 also succeeded his cousin, Christopher Codrington, to Dodington and his West Indian estates. After returning to England, Codrington took up his residence at Dodington Park. He married Elizabeth Bethell, daughter of William Bethell of Swindon, Yorkshire on 12 March 1718. He was created a baronet on. 21 April 1721.

Codrington stood for Parliament unsuccessfully at Banbury at the 1722 British general election. He was also unsuccessful when he stood for Minehead at the 1727 British general election and although he petitioned, it was not heard before the government closed the elections committee in March. 1730. At the 1734 British general election Codrington contested Ilchester unsuccessfully. He was eventually returned as Member of Parliament for Minehead at a contested by-election 28 June 1737 but did not live long enough to make an impression.

Codrington died on 17 December 1738 leaving seven sons and five daughters. He left £25,000 to each of his five daughters, of whom Bridget married William Dowdeswell. He was succeeded in the baronetcy by his son William.

Parliament of Great Britain
Preceded by Alexander Luttrell; Francis Whitworth	Member of Parliament for Minehead; 1737–1738; With: Francis Whitworth	Succeeded by Thomas Carew; Francis Whitworth
Baronetage of Great Britain
New creation	Baronet (of Dodington); 1721-1738	Succeeded by William Codrington
