= Codrington baronets =

Set index for Codrington baronets

There have been two baronetcies created for members of the Codrington family, one in the Baronetage of Great Britain and one in the Baronetage of the United Kingdom. Both creations are extant. The family was for a long time connected with Dodington Park.

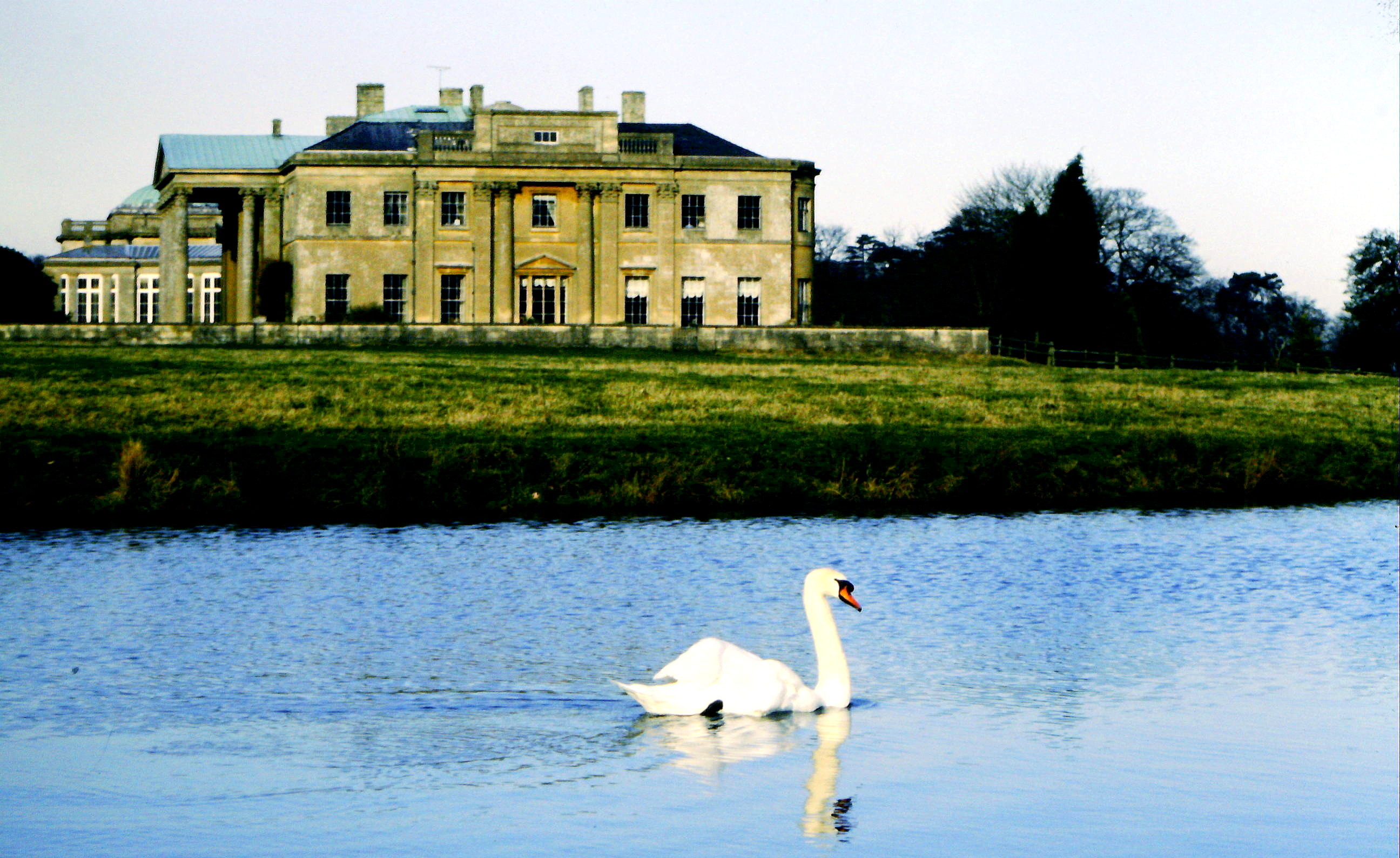
Dodington Park

- Codrington baronets of Dodington (1st creation, 1721)
- Codrington baronets of Dodington (2nd creation, 1876)
