= William Dowdeswell =

William Dowdeswell may refer to:

- William Dowdeswell (sheriff, died 1683) (died 1683), Sheriff of Worcestershire, 1678
- William Dowdeswell (politician, born 1682) (1682–1728), MP for Tewkesbury, 1712–1722
- William Dowdeswell (politician, born 1721) (1721–1775), British politician, Chancellor of the Exchequer, 1765–1766, son of the above
- William Dowdeswell (British Army officer) (1760–1828), British Army general, MP for Tewkesbury, 1792–1797, Governor of the Bahamas, 1797–1801, son of the above
- William Dowdeswell (politician, born 1804) (1804–1870), Conservative MP for Tewkesbury, 1835–1847
- William Dowdeswell (politician, born 1841) (1841–1893), Conservative MP for Tewkesbury, 1865–1866, and West Worcestershire, 1866–1876, son of the above
