= List of MPs elected in the 1831 United Kingdom general election =

1831–1832 Parliament of the United Kingdom
←	1830–1831 Parliament	1832–1835 Parliament	→
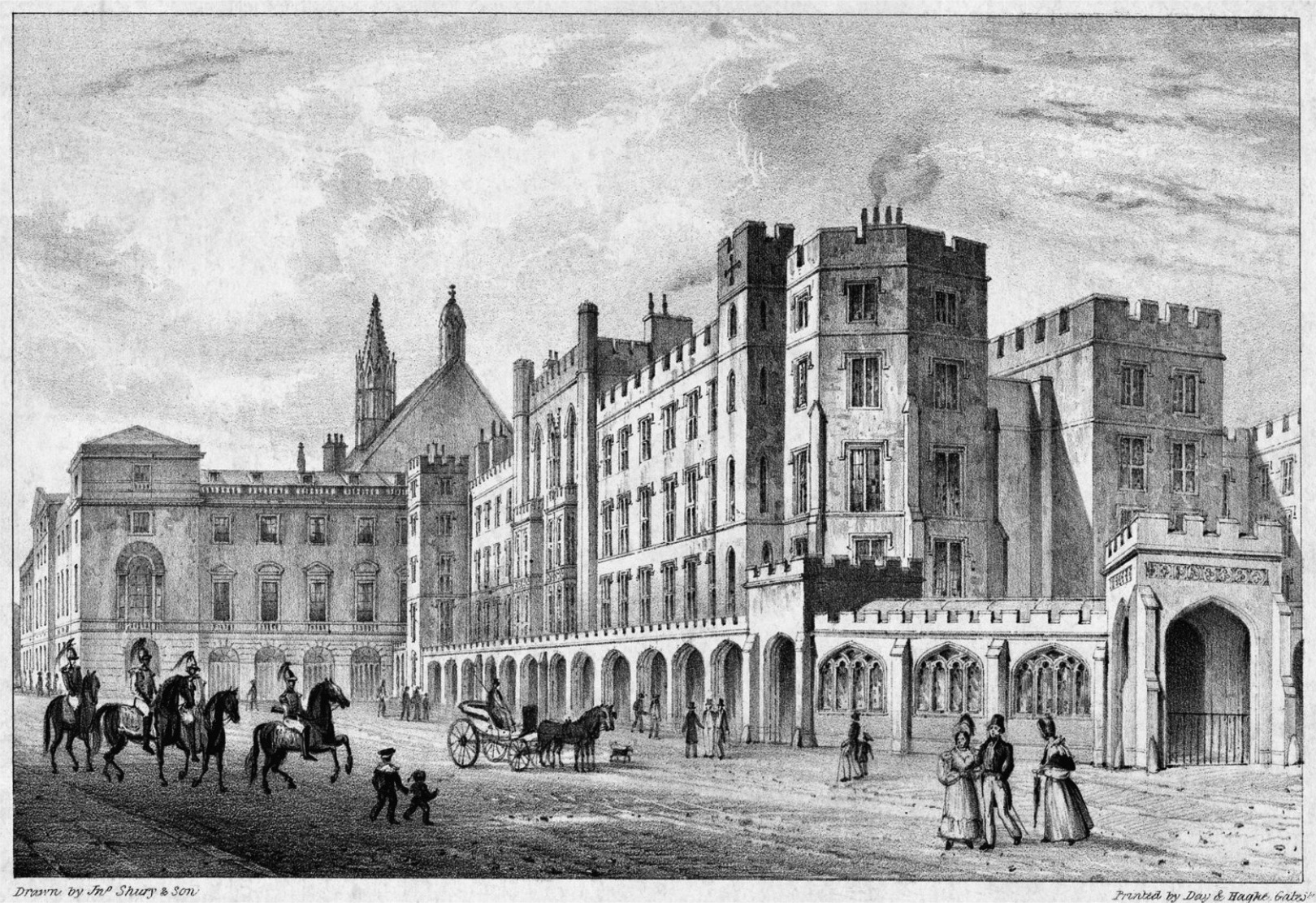
- The Palace of Westminster in 1834

Overview
- Legislative body: Parliament of the United Kingdom
- Jurisdiction: United Kingdom
- Meeting place: Palace of Westminster
- Term: 14 June 1831 – 16 August 1832
- Election: 1831 United Kingdom general election

Crown-in-Parliament William IV

Sessions
- 1st: 14 June 1831 – 20 October 1831
- 2nd: 6 December 1831 – 16 August 1832

This is a list of MPs elected to the House of Commons at the 1831 United Kingdom general election, arranged by constituency. The Parliament was summoned on 23 April 1831 and voting took place primarily in May. It first assembled on 14 June 1831 and was dissolved on 3 December 1832. The Prime Minister was the leader of the Whig Party, Charles Grey, 2nd Earl Grey. The Speaker of the House was Charles Manners-Sutton, the member for Scarborough.

Table of contents:

A B C D E F G H I K L M N O P Q R S T W Y Changes

== A ==
Constituency	MP	Party
Aberdeen Burghs	Horatio Ross	Whig
Aberdeenshire	William Gordon	Tory
Abingdon	John Maberly	Whig
Aldborough (two members)	Clinton James Fynes Clinton	Tory
Aldborough (two members)	Michael Thomas Sadler	Tory
Aldeburgh (two members)	Marquess of Douro	Tory
Aldeburgh (two members)	John Wilson Croker	Tory
Amersham (two members)	William Tyrwhitt-Drake	Tory
Amersham (two members)	Thomas Tyrwhitt-Drake	Tory
Andover (two members)	Henry Arthur Wallop Fellowes	Whig
Andover (two members)	Ralph Etwall	Whig
Anglesey	The Earl of Uxbridge	Whig
Anstruther Burghs	Andrew Johnston	Whig
Antrim (two members)	The Earl of Belfast	Whig
Antrim (two members)	Hon. John Bruce Richard O'Neill	Tory
Appleby (two members)	Hon. Henry Tufton	Whig
Appleby (two members)	Viscount Maitland	Tory
Argyllshire	Walter Frederick Campbell	Whig
Armagh	Viscount Ingestre (Note: Resigned seat to contest Dublin City and replaced 25 August 1831 by John William Head Brydges.)	Tory
County Armagh (two members)	Viscount Acheson	Whig
County Armagh (two members)	Charles Brownlow	Whig
Arundel (two members)	Lord Dudley Stuart	Whig
Arundel (two members)	John Atkins	Tory
Ashburton (two members)	Robert Torrens	Whig
Ashburton (two members)	William Stephen Poyntz	Whig
Athlone	Richard Handcock	Tory
Aylesbury (two members)	The Lord Nugent	Whig
Aylesbury (two members)	William Rickford	Whig
Ayr	Thomas Francis Kennedy	Whig
Ayrshire	William Blair	Tory
== B ==
Constituency	MP	Party
Banbury	John Easthope	Whig
Bandon	Francis Bernard, Viscount Bernard (Note: Resigned and replaced 22 July 1831 by Sir Augustus William James Clifford)	Tory
Banffshire	John Morison	Whig
Barnstaple (two members)	Frederick Hodgson	Tory
Barnstaple (two members)	John Chichester	Whig
Bath (two members)	Lord John Thynne	Tory
Bath (two members)	Charles Palmer	Whig
Beaumaris	Sir Richard Williams-Bulkeley	Whig
Bedford (two members)	Frederick Polhill	Tory
Bedford (two members)	William Henry Whitbread	Whig
Bedfordshire (two members)	Marquess of Tavistock	Whig
Bedfordshire (two members)	Peter Payne	Whig
Belfast	Sir Arthur Chichester	Whig
Bere Alston (two members)	David Lyon	Tory
Bere Alston (two members)	Lord Lovaine	Tory
Berkshire (two members)	Robert Throckmorton	Whig
Berkshire (two members)	Charles Dundas, 1st Baron Amesbury	Whig
Berwickshire	Anthony Maitland, 10th Earl of Lauderdale	Tory
Berwick-upon-Tweed (two members)	Marcus Beresford	Tory
Berwick-upon-Tweed (two members)	Sir Francis Blake, Bt	Whig
Beverley (two members)	William Marshall	Whig
Beverley (two members)	Henry Burton	Whig
Bewdley	Wilson Aylesbury Roberts	Tory
Bishop's Castle (two members)	James Lewis Knight-Bruce	Tory
Bishop's Castle (two members)	Edward Rogers	Tory
Bletchingley (two members)	Hon. John Ponsonby	Whig
Bletchingley (two members)	Charles Tennyson	Whig
Bodmin (two members)	Horace Seymour	Tory
Bodmin (two members)	Davies Giddy later Gilbert	Tory
Boroughbridge (two members)	Sir Charles Wetherell	Tory
Boroughbridge (two members)	Matthias Attwood	Tory
Bossiney (two members)	John Stuart-Wortley-Mackenzie	Tory
Bossiney (two members)	Edward Rose Tunno	Tory
Boston (two members)	John Wilks	Whig
Boston (two members)	Gilbert John Heathcote	Whig
Brackley (two members)	James Bradshaw	Tory
Brackley (two members)	Robert Haldane Bradshaw	Tory
Bramber (two members)	John Irving	Tory
Bramber (two members)	William Stratford Dugdale	Tory
Brecon	Charles Morgan Robinson Morgan	Whig
Breconshire	Thomas Wood	Tory
Bridgnorth (two members)	William Wolryche-Whitmore	Whig
Bridgnorth (two members)	James Foster	Whig
Bridgwater (two members)	William Thornton Astell	Tory
Bridgwater (two members)	Charles Kemeys Kemeys Tynte	Whig
Bridport (two members)	Henry Warburton	Radical
Bridport (two members)	Sir Horace St Paul, Bt	Tory
Bristol (two members)	Edward Protheroe, jnr	Whig
Bristol (two members)	James Evan Baillie	Whig
Buckingham (two members)	Sir George Nugent, Bt	Tory
Buckingham (two members)	Sir Thomas Fremantle, Bt	Tory
Buckinghamshire (two members)	Marquess of Chandos	Tory
Buckinghamshire (two members)	John Smith	Whig
Bury St Edmunds (two members)	Earl Jermyn	Tory
Bury St Edmunds (two members)	Lord Charles FitzRoy	Whig
Buteshire	no return - alternating constituency with Caithness	
== C ==
Constituency	MP	Party
Caernarvon	Hon. Sir Charles Paget	Whig
Caernarvonshire	Charles Griffith-Wynne	Tory
Caithness	George Sinclair	Whig
Callington (two members)	Henry Bingham Baring,	Tory
Callington (two members)	Hon. Edward Herbert	Tory
Calne (two members)	Charles Richard Fox	Whig
Calne (two members)	Thomas Babington Macaulay	Whig
Cambridge (two members)	Frederick Trench	Tory
Cambridge (two members)	Marquess of Graham	Tory
Cambridge University (two members)	Henry Goulburn	Tory
Cambridge University (two members)	William Yates Peel	Tory
Cambridgeshire (two members)	Henry John Adeane	Whig
Cambridgeshire (two members)	Richard Greaves Townley	Whig
Camelford (two members)	Mark Milbank	Whig
Camelford (two members)	Sheldon Cradock	Whig
Canterbury (two members)	Richard Watson	Whig
Canterbury (two members)	Viscount Fordwich	Whig
Cardiff	Lord Patrick Crichton-Stuart	Whig
Cardigan	Pryse Pryse	Whig
Cardiganshire	William Edward Powell	Tory
Carlisle (two members)	William James	Whig
Carlisle (two members)	Philip Howard	Whig
Carlow	Lord Tullamore	Tory
County Carlow (two members)	Walter Blackney	Whig
County Carlow (two members)	Sir John Milley Doyle	Whig
Carmarthen	John Jones (Note: Election delayed until 25 August 1831 due to rioting)	Tory
Carmarthenshire	Sir James Hamlyn-Williams	Whig
Carrickfergus	Lord George Hill	Whig
Cashel	Mathew Pennefather (Note: Vacated seat and replaced 16 July 1831 by Philip Pusey.)	Tory
Castle Rising (two members)	Lord William Cholmondeley	Tory
Castle Rising (two members)	Fulk Greville Howard	Tory
Cavan (two members)	Henry Maxwell	Tory
Cavan (two members)	Sir John Young, Bt	Tory
Cheshire (two members)	Viscount Belgrave	Tory
Cheshire (two members)	George Wilbraham	Whig
Chester (two members)	Foster Cunliffe-Offley	Whig
Chester (two members)	Lord Robert Grosvenor	Whig
Chichester (two members)	Lord Arthur Lennox	Tory
Chichester (two members)	John Abel Smith	Whig
Chippenham (two members)	Joseph Neeld	Tory
Chippenham (two members)	Henry George Boldero	Tory
Christchurch (two members)	George Pitt Rose	Tory
Christchurch (two members)	Sir George Henry Rose	Tory
Cirencester (two members)	Joseph Cripps	Tory
Cirencester (two members)	Lord Apsley	Tory
Clackmannanshire	No return - alternating constituency with Kinross-shire	
Clare (two members)	William Nugent Macnamara	Whig
Clare (two members)	Maurice O'Connell	Radical Party (UK)
Clitheroe (two members)	Hon. Peregrine Cust	Tory
Clitheroe (two members)	Hon. Robert Curzon	Tory
Clonmel	Eyre Coote	Tory
Cockermouth (two members)	John Henry Lowther	Tory
Cockermouth (two members)	Sir James Scarlett	Tory
Colchester (two members)	Daniel Whittle Harvey	Radical Party (UK)
Colchester (two members)	William Mayhew	Whig
Coleraine	Sir John William Head Brydges (Note: Unseated on petition and replaced 4 August 1831 by William Taylor Copeland)	Tory
Corfe Castle (two members)	Philip John Miles	Tory
Corfe Castle (two members)	George Bankes	Tory
Cork City (two members)	Daniel Callaghan	Whig
Cork City (two members)	John Boyle	Whig
County Cork (two members)	Hon. Robert King	Whig
County Cork (two members)	Viscount Boyle	Whig
Cornwall (two members)	Edward William Wynne Pendarves	Whig
Cornwall (two members)	Sir Charles Lemon, Bt	Whig
Coventry (two members)	Edward Ellice	Whig
Coventry (two members)	Henry Bulwer	Whig
Cricklade (two members)	Thomas Calley	Whig
Cricklade (two members)	Robert Gordon	Whig
Cromartyshire	Duncan Davidson	Tory
Cumberland (two members)	Sir James Graham, Bt	Whig
Cumberland (two members)	Walter Blamire	Whig
== D ==
Constituency	MP	Party
Dartmouth	Arthur Howe Holdsworth	Tory
Denbigh Boroughs	Robert Myddelton Biddulph	Whig
Denbighshire	Sir Watkin Williams Wynn, Bt	Tory
Derby (two members)	Henry Frederick Compton Cavendish	Whig
Derby (two members)	Edward Strutt	Whig
Derbyshire (two members)	Lord George Cavendish (Note: Ennobled and replaced 22 September 1831 by William Cavendish)	Whig
Derbyshire (two members)	Hon. George Venables-Vernon	Whig
Devizes (two members)	John Pearse	Tory
Devizes (two members)	George Watson-Taylor	Tory
Devon (two members)	Viscount Ebrington	Whig
Devon (two members)	Lord John Russell	Whig
Donegal (two members)	Sir Edmund Hayes	Tory
Donegal (two members)	Edward Michael Conolly	Tory
Dorchester (two members)	Hon. Anthony Henry Ashley-Cooper	Tory
Dorchester (two members)	Robert Williams	Tory
Dorset (two members)	Edward Portman	Whig
Dorset (two members)	John Calcraft	Whig
Dover (two members)	Charles Poulett Thomson	Whig
Dover (two members)	Robert Henry Stanhope	Whig
Down (two members)	Lord Arthur Hill	Whig
Down (two members)	Frederick Stewart, Viscount Castlereagh	Tory
Downpatrick	Edward Southwell Ruthven	Whig
Downton (two members)	James Brougham	Whig
Downton (two members)	Thomas Creevey	Whig
Drogheda	John Henry North (Note: Died and replaced 20 October 1831 by Thomas Wallace)	Tory
Droitwich (two members)	Sir Thomas Winnington, Bt	Whig
Droitwich (two members)	John Hodgetts Hodgetts-Foley	Whig
Dublin (two members)	Sir Robert Harty, Bt (Note: Election declared void. Replaced 18 August 1831 by Sir Frederick Shaw, Bt)	Whig
Dublin (two members)	Louis Perrin (Note: Election declared void. Replaced 18 August 1831 by Viscount Ingestre)	Whig
County Dublin (two members)	Henry White	Whig
County Dublin (two members)	Lord Brabazon	Whig
Dublin University	Thomas Langlois Lefroy	Tory
Dumfries Burghs	Lord William Robert Keith Douglas	Tory
Dumfriesshire	John James Hope Johnstone	Tory
Dunbartonshire	Lord Montagu William Graham	Tory
Dundalk	James Edward Gordon	Tory
Dungannon	John James Knox	Tory
Dungarvan	Hon. George Lamb	Whig
Dunwich (two members)	Frederick Barne	Tory
Dunwich (two members)	The Earl of Brecknock	Tory
Durham City (two members)	Sir Roger Gresley (Note: Election declared void, 8 March 1831. By-election, 23 March 1831)	Tory
Durham City (two members)	Hon. Arthur Trevor	Tory
County Durham (two members)	William Russell	Whig
County Durham (two members)	Sir Hedworth Williamson, Bt	Whig
Dysart Burghs	Robert Ferguson of Raith	Whig
== E ==
Constituency	MP	Party
East Grinstead (two members)	Viscount Holmesdale	Tory
East Grinstead (two members)	Frederick Richard West	Tory
East Looe (two members)	Thomas Arthur Kemmis	Tory
East Looe (two members)	Henry Thomas Hope	Tory
East Retford (two members)	Viscount Newark	Whig
East Retford (two members)	Granville Harcourt-Vernon	Whig
Edinburgh	Robert Adam Dundas	Tory
Elgin	Sir William Gordon Gordon-Cumming	Tory
Elginshire	Francis William Grant	Tory
Ennis	Rt Hon.William Vesey FitzGerald (Note: Ennobled and replaced 28 February 1832 by Sir Augustine Fitzgerald, Bt)	Tory
Enniskillen	Hon. Arthur Henry Cole	Tory
Essex (two members)	William Pole-Tylney-Long-Wellesley	Tory
Essex (two members)	Charles Callis Western	Whig
Evesham (two members)	Sir Charles Cockerell	Whig
Evesham (two members)	Thomas Hudson	Whig
Exeter (two members)	James Wentworth Buller	Whig
Exeter (two members)	Lewis William Buck	Tory
Eye (two members)	Sir Edward Kerrison, Bt	Tory
Eye (two members)	William Burge	Tory
== F ==
Constituency	MP	Party
Fermanagh (two members)	Mervyn Archdall	Tory
Fermanagh (two members)	Viscount Cole	Tory
Fife	James Lindsay	Tory
Flint	Sir Edward Pryce Lloyd, Bt (Note: Ennobled and replaced 22 September 1831 by Henry Glynne)	Whig
Flintshire	Edward Lloyd-Mostyn	Whig
Forfarshire	Hon. William Maule (Note: Ennobled and replaced 3 October 1831 by Hon. Donald Ogilvie (later unseated on petition))	Whig
Fowey (two members)	Lord Brudenell	Tory
Fowey (two members)	John Cheesment Severn	Tory
== G ==
Constituency	MP	Party
Gatton (two members)	Viscount Pollington	Tory
Gatton (two members)	Anthony John Ashley	Tory
Galway Borough	James James Bodkin	Tory
County Galway (two members)	Sir John Burke	Whig
County Galway (two members)	James Staunton Lambert	Whig
Glamorganshire	Christopher Rice Mansel Talbot	Whig
Glasgow Burghs	Joseph Dixon	Whig
Gloucester (two members)	Maurice Berkeley	Whig
Gloucester (two members)	Edward Webb	Whig
Gloucestershire (two members)	Hon. Henry George Francis Moreton	Whig
Gloucestershire (two members)	Sir Berkeley Guise, Bt	Whig
Grantham (two members)	Glynne Earle Welby, Bt	Tory
Grantham (two members)	James Hughes	Whig
Great Bedwyn	Sir John Nicholl	Tory
Great Bedwyn	John Jacob Buxton	Tory
Great Marlow	Thomas Peers Williams	Tory
Great Marlow	Owen Williams	Whig
Grimsby (two members)	John Villiiers Shelley	Tory
Grimsby (two members)	George Harris	Tory
Great Yarmouth (two members)	Hon. George Anson	Whig
Great Yarmouth (two members)	Charles Edmund Rumbold	Whig
Guildford (two members)	Charles Francis Norton	Whig
Guildford (two members)	James Mangles	Whig
== H ==
Constituency	MP	Party
Haddington	Robert Steuart (Note: Unseated on petition and replaced 10 August 1831 by Sir Adolphus Dalrymple, Bt)	
Haddingtonshire	James Balfour	
Hampshire (two members)	Sir James Macdonald, Bt	
Hampshire (two members)	Charles Shaw-Lefevre	Whig
Harwich (two members)	George Robert Dawson	
Harwich (two members)	John Charles Herries	Tory
Haslemere (two members)	William Holmes	Tory
Haslemere (two members)	Sir John Beckett, Bt	Tory
Hastings (two members)	John Ashley Warre	Whig
Hastings (two members)	Frederick North	Whig
Haverfordwest	Richard Philipps	
Hedon (two members)	Sir Thomas Clifford-Constable, Bt	Tory
Hedon (two members)	Robert Farrand	Tory
Helston (two members)	Lord James Townshend	Tory
Helston (two members)	Sackville Lane-Fox	Tory
Hereford (two members)	Edward Bolton Clive	Whig
Hereford (two members)	Viscount Eastnor	
Herefordshire (two members)	Sir Robert Price, Bt	Whig
Herefordshire (two members)	Kedgwin Hoskins	Whig
Hertford (two members)	John Currie	Whig
Hertford (two members)	Thomas Slingsby Duncombe	Radical
Hertfordshire (two members)	Nicolson Calvert	Whig
Hertfordshire (two members)	Sir John Sebright, Bt	
Heytesbury	Edward Henry A'Court	
Heytesbury	Sir George Staunton, Bt	
Higham Ferrers	Viscount Milton (Note: Chose to sit for Northamptonshire and replaced 14 July 1831 by Charles Christopher Pepys (who later resigned))	Whig
Hindon (two members)	Edward John Stanley	Whig
Hindon (two members)	John Weyland	Whig
Honiton (two members)	Henry Baines Lott	
Honiton (two members)	Sir George Warrender, Bt	
Horsham (two members)	Nicholas Ridley-Colborne, Bt	
Horsham (two members)	The Earl of Arundel	
Huntingdon (two members)	Jonathan Peel	
Huntingdon (two members)	Sir Frederick Pollock	Tory
Huntingdonshire (two members)	Viscount Mandeville	
Huntingdonshire (two members)	John Bonfoy Rooper	
Hythe (two members)	John Loch	
Hythe (two members)	Stewart Marjoribanks	
== I ==
Constituency	MP	Party
Ilchester (two members)	Hon. Edward Petre	Whig
Ilchester (two members)	Stephen Lushington	Whig
Inverness Burghs	Charles Lennox Cumming Bruce	Tory
Inverness-shire	Rt Hon. Charles Grant	Whig
Ipswich (two members)	James Morrison	
Ipswich (two members)	Rigby Wason	
== K ==
Constituency	MP	Party
Kent (two members)	Thomas Rider	Whig
Kent (two members)	Thomas Law Hodges	Whig
Kerry (two members)	Frederick William Mullins	
Kerry (two members)	Daniel O'Connell	Whig
Kildare (two members)	Sir Josiah Hort	Whig
Kildare (two members)	Richard More O'Ferrall	Whig
Kilkenny City	Nicholas Philpot Leader	Whig
County Kilkenny (two members)	Frederick Cavendish Ponsonby	
County Kilkenny (two members)	John Butler, Earl of Ossory	
Kincardineshire	Sir Hugh Arbuthnot	
King's County (two members)	Lord Oxmantown	
King's County (two members)	Thomas Bernard	
King's Lynn (two members)	Lord William Pitt Lennox	Whig
King's Lynn (two members)	Lord George Bentinck	
Kingston upon Hull (two members)	George Schonswar	Tory
Kingston upon Hull (two members)	William Battie-Wrightson	Whig
Kinross-shire	Charles Adam	
Kinsale	John Russell	Whig
Kirkcudbright	Robert Cutlar Fergusson	
Knaresborough (two members)	Sir James Mackintosh	Whig
Knaresborough (two members)	Henry Manners Cavendish	Whig
== L ==
Constituency	MP	Party
Lanark Burghs	William Downe Gillon	
Lanarkshire	Charles Douglas	
Lancashire (two members)	Lord Stanley	
Lancashire (two members)	Benjamin Heywood	Tory
Lancaster (two members)	Patrick Maxwell Stewart	Whig
Lancaster (two members)	Thomas Greene	Tory
Launceston (two members)	Sir John Malcolm	Tory
Launceston (two members)	James Brogden	Tory
Leicester (two members)	Wynne Ellis	Whig
Leicester (two members)	William Evans	Whig
Leicestershire (two members)	Charles March-Phillipps	
Leicestershire (two members)	Thomas Paget	Whig
Leitrim (two members)	Samuel White	
Leitrim (two members)	John Marcus Clements	
Leominster (two members)	William Bertram Evans	
Leominster (two members)	Thomas Brayen (Note: Vacated seat and replaced 22 December 1831 by Beaumont Hotham, 3rd Baron Hotham)	
Lewes (two members)	Thomas Read Kemp	Whig
Lewes (two members)	Sir Charles Blunt, Bt	
Lichfield (two members)	Sir Edward Scott, Bt	Whig
Lichfield (two members)	Sir George Anson	Whig
Limerick City	Thomas Spring Rice	Whig
County Limerick (two members)	Standish O'Grady	
County Limerick (two members)	Richard FitzGibbon	
Lincoln (two members)	George Fieschi Heneage	
Lincoln (two members)	Charles Delaet Waldo Sibthorp	
Lincolnshire (two members)	Sir William Amcotts-Ingilby, Bt.	
Lincolnshire (two members)	Charles Anderson Worsley Pelham	
Linlithgowshire	Sir Alexander Hope	
Lisburn	Henry Meynell	Tory
Liskeard (two members	Lord Eliot	Tory
Liskeard (two members	Sir William PringleTory	
Liverpool (two members)	John Evelyn Denison (Note: Denison was also elected for Nottinghamshire, which he chose to represent, and never sat for Liverpool. Replaced 21 October 1931 by Viscount Sandon)	Whig
Liverpool (two members)	William Ewart	Whig
The City London (four members)	William Thompson	Tory
The City London (four members)	Robert Waithman	Whig
The City London (four members)	William Venables	Whig
The City London (four members)	Sir Matthew Wood, Bt	Whig
Londonderry City	Sir Robert Alexander Ferguson, Bt	Whig
County Londonderry (two members)	Theobald Jones	Tory
County Londonderry (two members)	Sir Robert Bateson, Bt	Tory
County Longford (two members)	Anthony Lefroy	
County Longford (two members)	Viscount Forbes	
Lostwithiel (two members)	Viscount Valletort	Tory
Lostwithiel (two members)	Edward Cust	Tory
County Louth (two members)	Richard Lalor Shiel	
County Louth (two members)	Alexander Dawson	
Ludgershall (two members)	Edward Thomas Foley	Tory
Ludgershall (two members)	Sir Sandford Graham, 2nd Baronet	Whig
Ludlow (two members)	Viscount Clive	Tory
Ludlow (two members)	Robert Clive	
Lyme Regis (two members)	Hon. Henry Sutton Fane	Tory
Lyme Regis (two members)	John Thomas Fane	Tory
Lymington (two members)	William Alexander Mackinnon	Tory
Lymington (two members)	George Burrard	
== M ==
Constituency	MP	Party
Maidstone (two members)	Abraham Wildey Robarts	Whig
Maidstone (two members)	Charles James Barnett	Whig
Maldon (two members)	Quintin Dick	Tory
Maldon (two members)	Thomas Barrett Lennard	Whig
Mallow	Sir Denham Jephson-Norreys, Bt	Whig
Malmesbury (two members)	Sir Charles Forbes, Bt	Tory
Malmesbury (two members)	John Forbes	Tory
Malton (two members)	Henry Gally Knight	
Malton (two members)	Francis Jeffrey	Whig
Marlborough (two members)	Thomas Bucknall-Estcourt	Tory
Marlborough (two members)	William John Bankes	Tory
Mayo (two members)	John Denis Browne	
Mayo (two members)	Dominick Browne	
Meath (two members)	Arthur Plunkett, Baron Killeen	
Meath (two members)	Sir Marcus Somerville, Bt (Note: Died and replaced 11 August 1831 by Henry Gratton)	
Merioneth	Sir Robert Williames Vaughan	Tory
Middlesex (two members)	George Byng	Whig
Middlesex (two members)	Joseph Hume	Radical
Midhurst (two members)	George Robert Smith	
Midhurst (two members)	Martin Tucker Smith	
Midlothian	Sir George Clerk, Bt	(Tory)
Milborne Port (two members)	George Stevens Byng	Whig
Milborne Port (two members)	Richard Lalor Sheil (Note: Chose to sit for County Louth. Replaced 15 July 1831 by Philip Cecil Crampton)	Whig
Minehead (two members)	John Fownes Luttrell, junior	Tory
Minehead (two members)	Viscount Villiers	Tory
Mitchell (two members)	Hon. Lloyd Kenyon	Tory
Mitchell (two members)	Hon. William Samuel Best	Tory
Monaghan (two members)	Cadwallader Blayney	Tory
Monaghan (two members)	Henry Westenra	Whig
Monmouth Boroughs	Benjamin Hall	Whig
Monmouthshire (two members)	William Addams Williams	Whig
Monmouthshire (two members)	Lord Granville Somerset	Tory
Montgomery	Henry Clive	
Montgomeryshire	Charles Watkin Williams-Wynn	Tory
Morpeth (two members)	William Ord	Whig
Morpeth (two members)	Hon. William Howard	
== N ==
Constituency	MP	Party
Nairnshire	no return - alternating constituency with Cromartyshire	
Newark (two members)	William Farnworth Handley	Tory
Newark (two members)	Thomas Wilde	Whig
Newcastle-under-Lyme (two members)	Edmund Peel	Tory
Newcastle-under-Lyme (two members)	William Henry Miller	Whig
Newcastle-upon-Tyne (two members)	Sir Matthew White Ridley, Bt	Whig
Newcastle-upon-Tyne (two members)	John Hodgson	Tory
Newport (Cornwall) (two members)	Sir Henry Hardinge	Tory
Newport (Cornwall) (two members)	Viscount Grimston	Tory
Newport (IoW) (two members)	William Mount	Tory
Newport (IoW) (two members)	James Joseph Hope-Vere	Tory
New Radnor	See Radnor	
New Ross	Charles Tottenham (Note: Vacated seat and replaced 15 August 1831 by William Wigram)	Tory
Newry	Hon. John Henry Knox	Tory
New Shoreham (two members)	Sir Charles Burrell, Bt	Tory
New Shoreham (two members)	Henry Howard	
Newton (two members)	Thomas Legh	
Newton (two members)	Thomas Houldsworth	
Newtown (IoW) (two members)	Hudson Gurney	Whig
Newtown (IoW) (two members)	William Horne	Whig
Norfolk (two members)	Thomas Coke	Whig
Norfolk (two members)	Sir William Ffolkes, Bt	Whig
Northallerton (two members)	Sir John Poo Beresford	Tory
Northallerton (two members)	William Lascelles	Tory
Northampton (two members)	Sir George Robinson, Bt.	
Northampton (two members)	Robert Vernon Smith	Whig
Northamptonshire (two members)	Viscount Althorp	Whig
Northamptonshire (two members)	Viscount Milton	Whig
Northumberland (two members)	Viscount Howick	Whig
Northumberland (two members)	Thomas Wentworth Beaumont	Whig
Norwich (two members)	Robert Grant	Whig
Norwich (two members)	Richard Hanbury Gurney	
Nottingham (two members)	Thomas Denman	Whig
Nottingham (two members)	Sir Ronald Craufurd Ferguson	Whig
Nottinghamshire (two members)	Evelyn Denison)	Whig
Nottinghamshire (two members)	John Lumley	Whig
== O ==
Constituency	MP	Party
Okehampton (two members)	William Henry Trant (Note: Resigned and replaced 14 July 1831 by Sir Richard Vyvyan)	Tory
Okehampton (two members)	John Thomas Hope	Tory
Old Sarum (two members)	James Alexander	Tory
Old Sarum (two members)	Josias Alexander	Tory
Orford (two members)	Sir Henry Frederick Cooke	Tory
Orford (two members)	Spencer Kilderbee	Tory
Orkney and Shetland	George Traill	Whig
Oxford (two members)	James Haughton Langston	Whig
Oxford (two members)	Richard Weyland	Whig
Oxfordshire (two members)	George Granville Harcourt	Whig
Oxfordshire (two members)	John Fane	Tory
Oxford University (two members)	Thomas Grimston Bucknall Estcourt	Tory
Oxford University (two members)	Sir Robert Harry Inglis, Bt	
== P ==
Constituency	MP	Party
Peeblesshire	Sir John Hay, Bt	
Pembroke	Hugh Owen Owen	Tory
Pembrokeshire	Sir John Owen, Bt	
Penryn (two members)	Charles Stewart	Tory
Penryn (two members)	James William Freshfield	Tory
Perth Burghs	Francis Jeffrey, Lord Jeffrey	
Perthshire	Sir George Murray	
Peterborough (two members)	Sir Robert Heron, Bt	Whig
Peterborough (two members)	John Nicholas Fazakerley	Whig
Petersfield (two members)	Sir William Jolliffe, Bt	
Petersfield (two members)	Gilbert East Jolliffe	
Plymouth (two members)	Sir George Cockburn, Bt	
Plymouth (two members)	Sir Thomas Byam Martin	
Plympton Erle (two members)	Sir Compton Domvile, Bt	Tory
Plympton Erle (two members)	Gibbs Crawfurd Antrobus	Tory
Pontefract (two members)	Hon. Henry Stafford-Jerningham	Whig
Pontefract (two members)	The Earl of Mexborough	
Poole (two members)	John Byng, 1st Earl of Strafford	Whig
Poole (two members)	Benjamin Lester Lester	Whig
Portarlington	Sir William Rae, Bt	Tory
Portsmouth (two members)	Sir Francis Baring, Bt	Whig
Portsmouth (two members)	John Bonham-Carter	Whig
Preston (two members)	Henry Hunt	Radical
Preston (two members)	John Wood	Whig
== Q ==
Constituency	MP	Party
Queenborough (two members)	John Capel	Tory
Queenborough (two members)	Lt General Sir John Colquhoun Grant	Tory
Queen's County (two members)	Sir Charles Coote, Bt	
Queen's County (two members)	Sir Henry Parnell	
== R ==
Constituency	MP	Party
Radnor	Richard Price	Tory
Radnorshire	Thomas Frankland Lewis	Tory
Reading (two members)	Charles Russell	Tory
Reading (two members)	Charles Fyshe Palmer	Whig
Reigate (two members)	Sir Joseph Sydney Yorke (Note: Died and replaced 13 July 1831 by Charles Philip Yorke)	Tory
Reigate (two members)	Joseph Yorke	
Renfrewshire	Sir Michael Shaw-Stewart, Bt	
Richmond (two members)	Hon. John Dundas	Whig
Richmond (two members)	Hon. Sir Robert Dundas	Whig
Ripon (two members)	Louis Hayes Petit	Whig
Ripon (two members)	George Spence	Whig
Rochester (two members)	John Mills	Tory
Rochester (two members)	Ralph Bernal	
Romney (two members)	Sir Edward Cholmeley Dering	Tory
Romney (two members)	William Miles	Tory
Roscommon (two members)	Arthur French	
Roscommon (two members)	Denis O'Conor	
Ross-shire	James Alexander Stewart-Mackenzie	
Roxburghshire	Henry Francis Hepburne-Scott	
Rutland (two members)	Sir Gerard Noel, Bt	Tory
Rutland (two members)	Sir Gilbert Heathcote, Bt	Whig
Rye (two members)	Thomas Pemberton	
Rye (two members)	De Lacy Evans	
== S ==
Constituency	MP	Party
St Albans (two members)	Sir Francis Vincent, Bt	Whig
St Albans (two members)	Richard Godson	Whig
St Germans (two members)	Charles Ross	Tory
St Germans (two members)	Winthrop Mackworth Praed	Tory
St Ives (two members)	James Halse	Tory
St Ives (two members)	Edward Bulwer-Lytton	Whig
St Mawes (two members)	George Grenville Wandisford Pigott	Tory
St Mawes (two members)	Sir Edward Burtenshaw Sugden	Tory
Salisbury (two members)	Hon. Duncombe Pleydell-Bouverie	Whig
Salisbury (two members)	Wadham Wyndham	Tory
Saltash (two members)	Frederick Villiers Meynell	Whig
Saltash (two members)	Bethell Walrond	
Sandwich (two members)	Joseph Marryatt	Whig
Sandwich (two members)	Sir Edward Troubridge, 2nd Baronet	Whig
Scarborough (two members)	Charles Manners-Sutton	
Scarborough (two members)	Edmund Phipps	Tory
Seaford (two members)	John Fitzgerald	Tory
Seaford (two members)	William Lyon	Tory
Selkirkshire	Alexander Pringle	
Shaftesbury (two members)	Edward Penrhyn	Whig
Shaftesbury (two members)	William Leader Maberly	Whig
Shrewsbury (two members)	Richard Jenkins	Tory
Shrewsbury (two members)	Robert Aglionby Slaney	Whig
Shropshire (two members)	John Cressett-Pelham	
Shropshire (two members)	Sir Rowland Hill, Bt	
Sligo	John Arthur Wynne	Tory
County Sligo (two members)	Edward Joshua Cooper	
County Sligo (two members)	Alexander Perceval	
Somerset (two members)	Edward Ayshford Sanford	Whig
Somerset (two members)	William Gore-Langton	
Southampton (two members)	Arthur Atherley	
Southampton (two members)	John Storey Penleaze	
Southwark (two members)	William Brougham	Whig
Southwark (two members)	Charles Calvert	Whig
Stafford (two members)	John Campbell	Whig
Stafford (two members)	Thomas Gisborne	Whig
Staffordshire (two members)	Edward Littleton	Whig
Staffordshire (two members)	Major-General Sir John Wrottesley	Whig
Stamford (two members)	Lord Thomas Cecil	Tory
Stamford (two members)	Charles Tennyson	Whig
Steyning (two members)	George Richard Philips	Whig
Steyning (two members)	Edward Blount	Whig
Stirling	James Johnston	
Stirlingshire	William Ramsay	
Stockbridge (two members)	John Foster Barham	Whig
Stockbridge (two members)	Sir Stratford Canning	Whig
Sudbury (two members)	Sir John Benn Walsh	Tory
Sudbury (two members)	Bethel Walrond	
Suffolk (two members)	Sir Henry Bunbury, Bt	
Suffolk (two members)	Charles Tyrell	
Surrey (two members)	William Joseph Denison	Whig
Surrey (two members)	John Ivatt Briscoe	Whig
Sussex (two members)	Herbert Barrett Curteis	
Sussex (two members)	Lord John Lennox	Whig
Sutherland	Sir Hugh Innes (Note: Died and replaced 14 September 1831 by Roderick Macleod, 4th of Cadboll.)	
== T ==
Constituency	MP	Party
Tain Burghs	James Loch	Whig
Tamworth (two members)	Robert Peel	Tory
Tamworth (two members)	Lord Charles Townshend	
Taunton (two members)	Henry Labouchere	Whig
Taunton (two members)	Edward Thomas Bainbridge	Whig
Tavistock (two members)	Lord Russell	Whig
Tavistock (two members)	Lord John Russell (Note: Chose to sit for Devon, replaced 13 July 1831 by John Heywood Hawkins)	Whig
Tewkesbury (two members)	John Edmund Dowdeswell	Tory
Tewkesbury (two members)	John Martin	Whig
Thetford (two members)	Lord James FitzRoy	Whig
Thetford (two members)	Hon. Francis Baring	Tory
Thirsk (two members)	Robert Frankland	Whig
Thirsk (two members)	Robert Greenhill-Russell	Whig
Tipperary (two members)	John Hely Hutchinson	
Tipperary (two members)	Thomas Wyse	
Tiverton (two members)	Spencer Perceval	Tory
Tiverton (two members)	Hon. Granville Ryder	Tory
Totnes (two members)	Charles Barry Baldwin	
Totnes (two members)	Thomas Courtenay	
Tralee	Walker Ferrand	Tory
Tregony (two members)	Lt-Col. Charles Arbuthnot	Tory
Tregony (two members)	James Mackillop	Tory
Truro (two members)	Viscount Encombe	Tory
Truro (two members)	Nathaniel William Peach	Tory
Tyrone (two members)	Hon. Henry Lowry-Corry	Tory
Tyrone (two members)	Sir Hugh Stewart, Bt	Tory
== W ==
Constituency	MP	Party
Wallingford (two members)	Thomas Leigh	Whig
Wallingford (two members)	Robert Knight	Whig
Wareham (two members)	Granby Hales Calcraft	Whig
Wareham (two members)	Charles Wood	Whig
Warwick (two members)	John Tomes	
Warwick (two members)	Edward Bolton King	Whig
Warwickshire (two members)	Sir Grey Skipwith	Whig
Warwickshire (two members)	Francis Lawley	Whig
Waterford City	Sir John Newport, Bt.	Whig
County Waterford (two members)	Sir Richard Musgrave, Bt	
County Waterford (two members)	Robert Power	
Wells (two members)	John Edwards-Vaughan	Tory
Wells (two members)	John Lee Lee	Whig
Wendover (two members)	Samuel Smith	Tory
Wendover (two members)	Abel Smith	Tory
Wenlock (two members)	Hon. George Weld-Forester	Tory
Wenlock (two members)	Paul Beilby Thompson	Whig
Weobley (two members)	Lord Henry Thynne	Tory
Weobley (two members)	Lord Edward Thynne	Tory
Westbury (two members)	Sir Ralph Franco later Lopes, Bt	Whig
Westbury (two members)	Henry Hanmer (Note: Resigned and replaced 15 July 1831 by Henry Frederick Stephenson)	Whig
Westmeath (two members)	Gustavus Rochfort	Tory
Westmeath (two members)	Sir Montagu Lowther Chapman, Bt	Whig
West Looe (two members)	Sir Anthony Buller	Whig
West Looe (two members)	Sir Charles Hulse	Tory
Westminster (two members)	Sir Francis Burdett, Bt	Whig
Westminster (two members)	Sir John Cam Hobhouse, Bt	Whig
Westmorland (two members)	Henry Cecil Lowther	Tory
Westmorland (two members)	Alexander Nowell	Whig
Wexford	Charles Arthur Walker	Whig
County Wexford (two members)	Arthur Chichester	
County Wexford (two members)	Henry Lambert	
Weymouth and Melcombe Regis (four members)	Colonel John Gordon	Tory
Weymouth and Melcombe Regis (four members)	Thomas Fowell Buxton	Whig
Weymouth and Melcombe Regis (four members)	Richard Weyland	Whig
Weymouth and Melcombe Regis (four members)	Masterton Ure	Tory
Whitchurch (two members)	Horatio George Powys Townshend	Tory
Whitchurch (two members)	Sir Samuel Scott, Bt	Tory
Wicklow (two members)	Sir Ralph Howard, Bt	Whig
Wicklow (two members)	James Grattan	Whig
Wigan (two members)	James Alexander Hodson	Tory
Wigan (two members)	Ralph Thicknesse	Whig
Wigtown Burghs	Edward Stewart	Tory
Wigtownshire	Sir Andrew Agnew, Bt	Whig
Wilton (two members)	James Dawkins	
Wilton (two members)	John Hungerford Penruddocke	Tory
Wiltshire (two members)	John Benett	
Wiltshire (two members)	Sir John Dugdale Astley, Bt	
Winchelsea (two members)	John Williams	Whig
Winchelsea (two members)	Stephen Lushington (Note: Chose to sit for Ilchester and replaced 15 July 1831 by James Brougham)	Whig
Winchester (two members)	James Buller East	Tory
Winchester (two members)	Paulet St John-Mildmay	Whig
Windsor (two members)	Rt Hon. Edward Stanley	Whig
Windsor (two members)	John Ramsbottom, junior	Whig
Woodstock (two members)	Viscount Stormont	Tory
Woodstock (two members)	Lord Charles Spencer-Churchill	Tory
Wootton Bassett (two members)	Viscount Mahon	Tory
Wootton Bassett (two members)	Viscount Porchester	Tory
Worcester (two members)	Thomas Henry Hastings Davies	Whig
Worcester (two members)	George Richard Robinson	Whig
Worcestershire (two members)	Thomas Foley	Whig
Worcestershire (two members)	Frederick Spencer	Whig
Wycombe (two members)	Sir Thomas Baring, Bt	Whig
Wycombe (two members)	Hon. Robert Smith	Whig
== Y ==
Constituency	MP	Party
Yarmouth (Isle of Wight) (two members)	Sir Henry Willoughby	Whig
Yarmouth (Isle of Wight) (two members)	Charles Compton Cavendish	Whig
Yarmouth (Norfolk)	See Great Yarmouth	
York (two members)	Hon. Thomas Dundas	Whig
York (two members)	Samuel Adlam Bayntun	Tory
Yorkshire (four members)	Viscount Morpeth	Whig
Yorkshire (four members)	George Strickland	Whig
Yorkshire (four members)	John Charles Ramsden	Whig
Yorkshire (four members)	Sir John Vanden-Bempde-Johnstone, Bt	Whig
Youghal	Hon. George Ponsonby	Whig

== See also ==
- 1831 United Kingdom general election
- List of United Kingdom by-elections (1818–1832)
- List of parliaments of England
- List of parliaments of Great Britain
- List of parliaments of the United Kingdom
