= James Martin (1807–1878) =

British Liberal Party politician and banker

Member of Parliament for Tewkesbury
- In office 29 April 1859 – 12 July 1865 Serving with John Yorke (1864–1865); Frederick Lygon (1859–1864)
- Preceded by: Frederick Lygon; John Martin
- Succeeded by: John Yorke; William Edward Dowdeswell

Personal details
- Born: 1807
- Died: 1878 (aged 70–71)
- Party: Liberal
- Parent(s): John Martin; Frances Stone
- Relatives: John Martin (brother)
- Education: Charterhouse School

James Martin (1807 – 1878) was a British Liberal Party politician and banker.

== Early life and family ==
Martin was the third son of former Whig Tewkesbury MP John Martin (1774–1832) and Frances (née Stone), and brother of John Martin (1805–1880), who also served as a Whig MP for Tewkesbury. Educated at Charterhouse School, he then served in the family banking firm, Martin, Stone and Foote.

== Political career ==
Martin was elected Liberal MP for Tewkesbury at the 1859 general election and held the seat until 1865 when he was defeated. He stood again for the seat at a by-election in 1866, but was unsuccessful.

He was also at some point a Deputy Lieutenant of Herefordshire.

Parliament of the United Kingdom
Preceded by Frederick Lygon; John Martin	Member of Parliament for Tewkesbury; 1859–1865; With: John Yorke (1864–1865); Frederick Lygon (1859–1864)	Succeeded by John Yorke; William Edward Dowdeswell
