= Lechmere baronets =

Baronetcy in the Baronetage of the United Kingdom

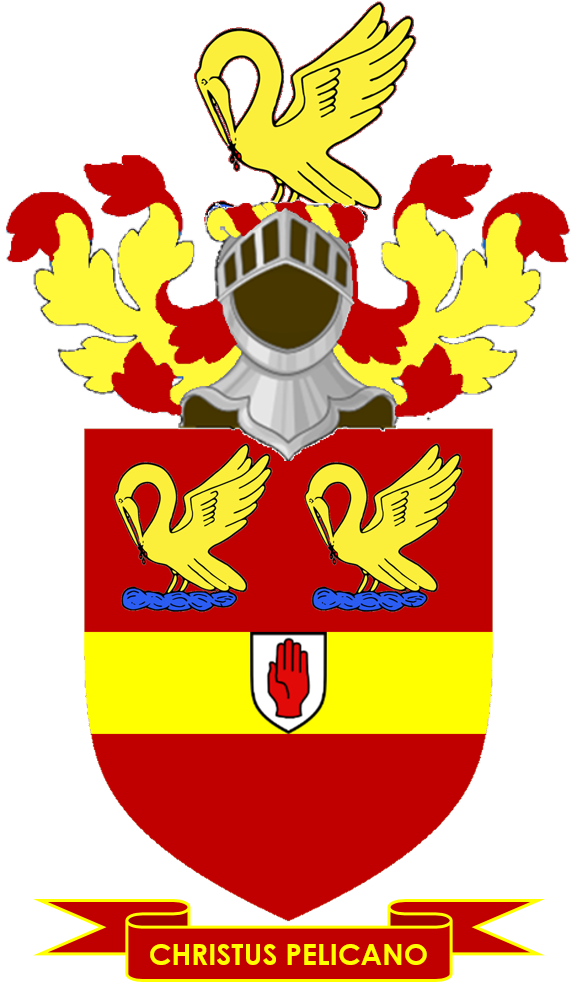
Arms: Gules a Fess Or in chief two Pelicans vulning themselves of the last; Crest: A Pelican Azure vulning herself proper; Motto: Christus Pelicano (Christ in the pelican)

The Lechmere Baronetcy, of The Rhydd in the County of Worcester, is a title in the Baronetage of the United Kingdom. It was created on 10 December 1818 for Anthony Lechmere. The second Baronet served as High Sheriff of Worcestershire in 1852. The third Baronet was high sheriff in 1862 and from 1866 was Conservative Member of Parliament for Tewkesbury, Worcestershire West, Bewdley and Worcestershire South. The sixth Baronet served as high sheriff in 1962 and as Vice-Lieutenant of Herefordshire and Worcestershire in 1977. In 2001 the title was inherited by his cousin and, as of 2017, the title is held by the latter's son, the eighth Baronet, who succeeded in 2010 and was high sheriff of Worcestershire in 2016.

The Lechmere family has been settled in Hanley Castle, Worcestershire, since the 11th century. Other members of the family include Sir Nicholas Lechmere, a Baron of the Exchequer during the reign of King William III and Member of Parliament for Bewdley, and his grandson Nicholas Lechmere, 1st Baron Lechmere, Solicitor-General, Attorney-General and Chancellor of the Duchy of Lancaster. The family surname is pronounced "Letchmere". The baronets were traditionally benefactors and governors of Hanley Castle Grammar School, which was renamed Hanley Castle High School in 1974. Founded in 1326, it is one of the oldest schools in England.

Sir Edmund Anthony Harley Lechmere, 3rd Baronet (1826–1894) and his wife were among the founders of Venerable Order of St John. They had travelled several times to Jerusalem and were involved in the establishment of The St John of Jerusalem Eye Hospital. A treatise on the antiquities of Malvern was dedicated to the 3rd Baronet because of the association of his family with the area for many centuries.

== Lechmere baronets, of The Rhydd (1818) ==
- Sir Anthony Lechmere, 1st Baronet (1766–1849)
- Sir Edmund Hungerford Lechmere, 2nd Baronet (1792–1856)
- Sir Edmund Anthony Harley Lechmere, 3rd Baronet (1826–1894)
- Sir Edmund Arthur Lechmere, 4th Baronet (1865–1937)
- Sir Ronald Berwick Hungerford Lechmere, 5th Baronet (1886–1965)
- Sir Berwick Hungerford Lechmere, 6th Baronet (1917–2001)
- Sir Reginald Anthony Hungerford Lechmere, 7th Baronet (1920–2010)
- Sir Nicholas Anthony Hungerford Lechmere, 8th Baronet (born 1960)

The heir apparent is the present holder's son Frederick Patrick Hungerford Lechmere (born 1992).

Baronetage of the United Kingdom
Preceded by Palmer-Acland baronets	Lechmere baronets of The Rhydd; 10 December 1818	Succeeded by Lacon baronets
