= John Dowdeswell =

Member of Parliament for Tewkesbury
- In office 5 October 1812 – 10 December 1832 Serving with John Martin
- Preceded by: Charles Hanbury-Tracy
- Succeeded by: John Martin

Personal details
- Born: 3 March 1772
- Died: 11 November 1851 (aged 79)
- Party: Tory
- Children: William Dowdeswell
- Parent: William Dowdeswell

John Edmund Dowdeswell (3 March 1772 – 11 November 1851) was an English politician. He served as a Member of Parliament (MP). His father was also an MP.

== See also ==
- List of MPs elected in the 1830 United Kingdom general election
- List of MPs elected in the 1831 United Kingdom general election
- List of MPs elected in the 1826 United Kingdom general election
- List of MPs elected in the 1820 United Kingdom general election
- List of MPs elected in the 1812 United Kingdom general election
- List of MPs elected in the 1818 United Kingdom general election
