= Humphrey Brown =

British Whig politician

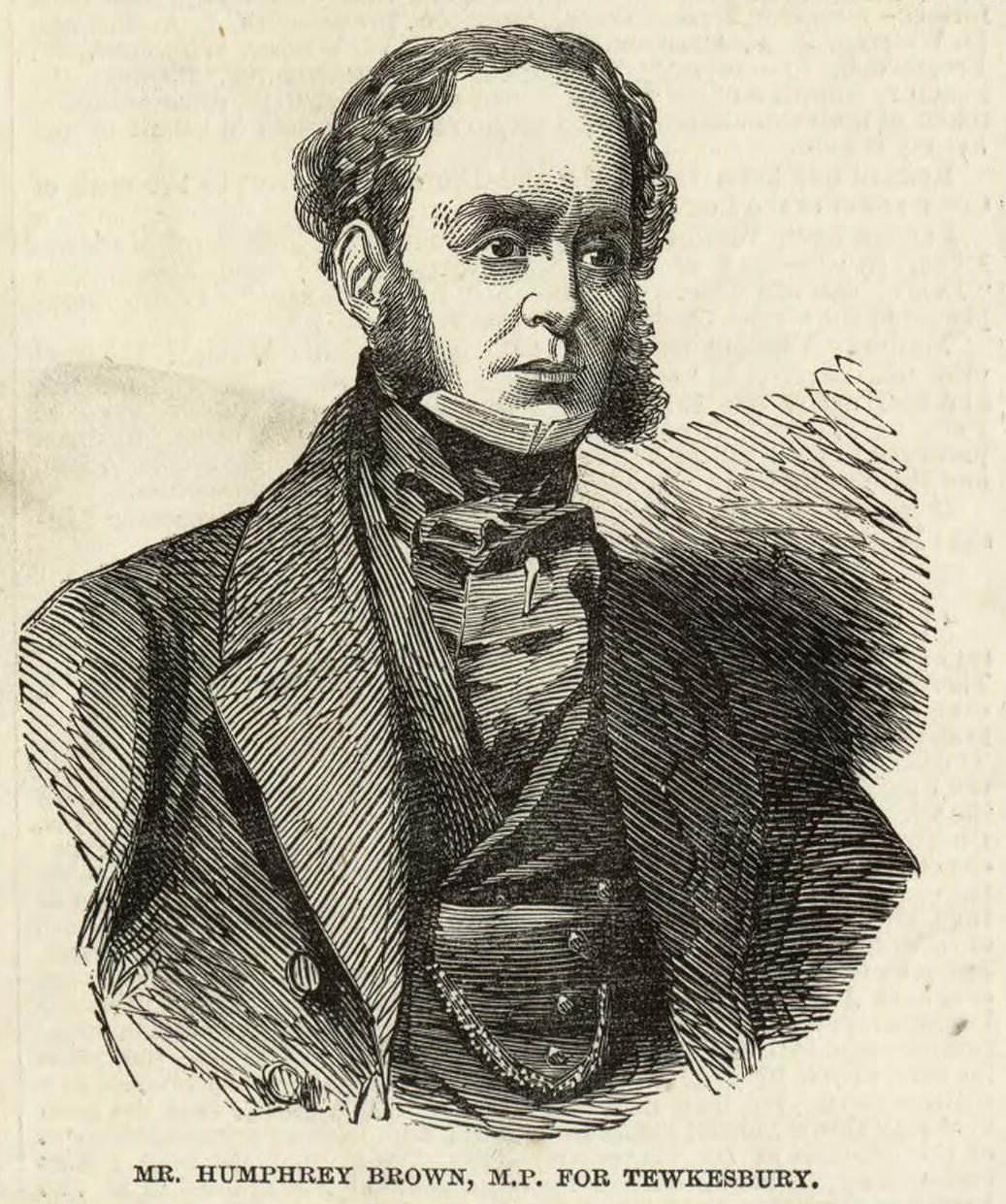

Member of Parliament for Tewkesbury
- In office 28 July 1847 – 28 March 1857 Serving with John Martin
- Preceded by: William Dowdeswell; John Martin
- Succeeded by: Frederick Lygon; John Martin

Personal details
- Born: 1803
- Died: 6 June 1860 (aged 56)
- Party: Whig

Humphrey Brown (1803 – 6 June 1860) was a British Whig politician.

Brown was first elected Whig MP for Tewkesbury at the 1847 general election and held the seat until 1857, when he was defeated. Although he attempted to regain the seat at a by-election in 1859—caused by the appointment of Frederick Lygon as a Civil Lord of the Admiralty–he was unsuccessful.

Parliament of the United Kingdom
Preceded by William Dowdeswell; John Martin	Member of Parliament for Tewkesbury; 1847–1857; With: John Martin	Succeeded by Frederick Lygon; John Martin
