= Frederick Lygon, 6th Earl Beauchamp =

British Conservative politician

The Right Honourable The Earl Beauchamp PC DL
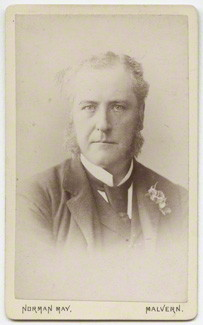

Lord Steward of the Household
- In office 21 February 1874 – 21 April 1880
- Monarch: Victoria
- Prime Minister: Benjamin Disraeli
- Preceded by: The Earl of Bessborough
- Succeeded by: The Earl Sydney

Paymaster General
- In office 24 June 1885 – 28 January 1886
- Monarch: Victoria
- Prime Minister: The Marquess of Salisbury
- Preceded by: The Lord Wolverton
- Succeeded by: The Lord Thurlow
- In office 19 August 1886 – March 1887
- Monarch: Victoria
- Prime Minister: The Marquess of Salisbury
- Preceded by: The Lord Thurlow
- Succeeded by: The Earl Brownlow

Personal details
- Born: 10 November 1830 Grosvenor Place, London, England
- Died: 19 February 1891 (aged 60) Madresfield Court, Worcestershire, England
- Party: Conservative
- Spouse(s): (1) Lady Mary Stanhope (1844–1876) (2) Lady Emily Pierrepont (1853–1935)
- Children: 9, including: William Lygon, 7th Earl Beauchamp; Margaret Russell, Baroness Ampthill; Maud, Lady Hoare, Viscountess Templewood; Lady Mary Trefusis
- Parent(s): Henry Lygon, 4th Earl Beauchamp; Lady Susan Eliot
- Education: Christ Church, Oxford

Frederick Lygon, 6th Earl Beauchamp, PC, DL (10 November 1830 – 19 February 1891), styled The Honourable Frederick Lygon between 1853 and 1866, was a British Conservative politician.

== Background and education ==
Beauchamp was the third son of Henry Lygon, 4th Earl Beauchamp, and Lady Susan Caroline, daughter of William Eliot, 2nd Earl of St Germans. He was educated at Eton, was President of the Oxford Union in 1851 and graduated from Christ Church, Oxford in 1856 with an MA degree.

== Political career ==
Beauchamp was Member of Parliament for Tewkesbury from 1857 to 1863 and for West Worcestershire from 1863 to 1866. In 1859 he was appointed Civil Lord of the Admiralty. On 4 March 1866 he inherited the earldom of Beauchamp on the death of his childless brother. He served under Benjamin Disraeli as Lord Steward of the Household between 1874 and 1880 and under Lord Salisbury as Paymaster-General from 1885 to 1886 and again from 1886 to 1887. In 1874 he was sworn of the Privy Council. He was also Lord Lieutenant of Worcestershire between 1876 and 1891.

== Other works ==
In addition to his political duties Frederick Lygon also found time to be a great philanthropist. He was one of the founders of Malvern Boys' College and later a chairman of the college council. He was also the driving force behind the building of the Almshouses and St Leonards Church at Newland, consecrated in 1864, conceived by his uncle John Reginald Pindar and his wife Charlotte. Frederick also finished the building of the church at Madresfield consecrated in 1867 which was the gift of Henry 5th Earl Beauchamp who had died before the work was completed.

Beauchamp was also the second President of the Folklore Society, serving in that role between 1880 and 1885. Even though he was one of the longest serving Presidents of the Society, It has been suggested that his links with the Society should be seen more as "aristocratic patronage" rather than active academic interest.

He also helped to establish the Pusey Memorial House (now known as Pusey House, Oxford).

He owned 17,000 acres, mostly in Worcester.

== Family ==
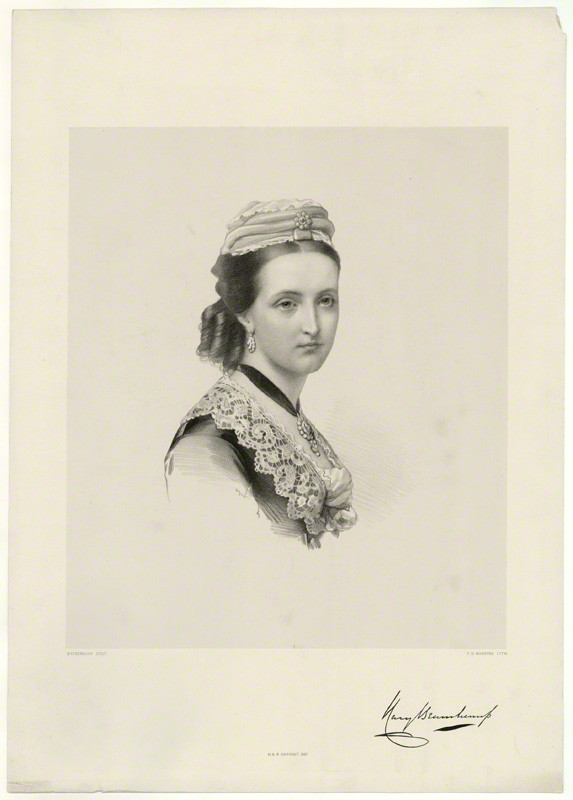
Lady Mary Stanhope

Lord Beauchamp married Lady Mary Stanhope (3 February 1844 – 30 June 1876), daughter of Philip Stanhope, 5th Earl Stanhope, and his wife Emily Harriet Kerrison, at St George's Church in Hanover Square, London, on 18 February 1868. They had five children:

- Lady Mary Trefusis (26 February 1869 – 12 September 1927), married 1905 Lt.-Col. Henry Hepburn-Stuart-Forbes-Trefusis (a son of the 20th Baron Clinton) and had issue. Lady Mary was a close friend and correspondent of her brother Lord Beauchamp. She was a friend and promoter of the composer Edward Elgar and is thought to be commemorated anonymously in one of his Enigma Variations entitled "Romanza (***)". She was the first President of the English Folk Dance and Song Society, Trefusis Hall in the EFDSS HQ, Cecil Sharp House, is named for her. She was also Lady in Waiting to Queen Mary.
- Lady Susan Lygon (24 May 1870 – 28 January 1962), married 1889 Sir Robert Gilmour, 1st Baronet, and had issue.
- William Lygon, Viscount Elmley, later 7th Earl Beauchamp (1872–1938)
- Lieutenant Hon. Edward Hugh Lygon (1873–23 March 1900), an officer in the Grenadier Guards, killed in South Africa during the Second Boer War.
- Lady Margaret Lygon (1874–1957), married the 2nd Baron Ampthill and had issue.

Lady Beauchamp died on 30 June 1876, and on 24 September 1878 Lord Beauchamp married Lady Emily Pierrepont (16 March 1853 – 11 May 1935), daughter of the 3rd Earl Manvers and his wife Georgiana Jane E. F. de Franquetot, at Perlethorpe in Nottinghamshire. They had four children, two sons and two daughters.

- Hon. Robert Lygon (9 August 1879 – 13 January 1952); m. 10 October 1903 Cecil Albinia Arbuthnot, daughter of Sir George Gough Arbuthnot; they had issue, one son Reginald (who died in 1976, aged 72, shortly before his half-cousin the 8th Earl; he had only daughters).
- Hon. Henry Lygon (10 April 1884 – 23 February 1936) who died unmarried aged 51.
- Lady Agnes Lygon (7 December 1880 – 1960); m. 1906 Hon. Arthur George Villiers Peel (27 Feb 1868 – 25 Apr 1956), and had issue.
- Lady Maud Lygon, later Lady Maud Hoare, and still later (1944) Viscountess Templewood (5 July 1882 – 27 December 1962) married 1909 Samuel Hoare, 1st Viscount Templewood (1880–1959); they had no issue. Lady Maud was created a Dame Commander of the Order of the British Empire in 1927.

Lord Beauchamp died on 19 February 1891, aged 60, at his home, Madresfield Court, from a heart attack he suffered at dinner that night. His eighteen-year-old eldest son William succeeded him in the earldom. He was buried in the churchyard of St Mary the Virgin Madresfield near the south east corner of the church alongside his first wife Mary; his second wife Emily was later interred on his other side. In his will he had expressly forbidden any tribute or monument.

== Sources ==
- "Lygon, Frederick" . Dictionary of National Biography. London: Smith, Elder & Co. 1885–1900.

Parliament of the United Kingdom
Preceded by Humphrey Brown; John Martin	Member of Parliament for Tewkesbury; 1857–1864; With: John Martin to 1859; James Martin from 1859	Succeeded by James Martin; John Yorke
Preceded by Viscount Elmley; Fredrick Knight	Member of Parliament for West Worcestershire; 1863–1866; With: Fredrick Knight	Succeeded by Fredrick Knight; William Edward Dowdeswell
Political offices
Preceded by The Earl of Bessborough	Lord Steward; 1874–1880	Succeeded by The Earl Sydney
Preceded by The Lord Wolverton	Paymaster General; 1886	Succeeded by The Lord Thurlow
Preceded by The Lord Thurlow	Paymaster General; 1886–1887	Succeeded by The Earl Brownlow
Honorary titles
Preceded by The Lord Lyttelton	Lord Lieutenant of Worcestershire; 1876–1891	Succeeded by The Earl of Coventry
Peerage of the United Kingdom
Preceded by Henry Lygon	Earl Beauchamp; 1866–1891	Succeeded by William Lygon
