= 1876 West Worcestershire by-election =

UK Parliamentary by-election

The 1876 West Worcestershire by-election was fought on 8 July 1876. The by-election was fought due to the resignation of the incumbent Conservative MP, William Edward Dowdeswell. It was won by the unopposed Conservative candidate Sir Edmund Lechmere.
