= Twyning =

Coordinates: 52.030556°N 2.147222°W

- Location within Gloucestershire
- Population: 1,560 (2011)
- OS grid reference: SO899370
- Civil parish: Twyning
- District: Tewkesbury
- Shire county: Gloucestershire
- Region: South West
- Country: England
- Sovereign state: United Kingdom
- Post town: TEWKESBURY
- Postcode district: GL20
- Dialling code: 01684
- Police: Gloucestershire
- Fire: Gloucestershire
- Ambulance: South Western
- UK Parliament: Tewkesbury

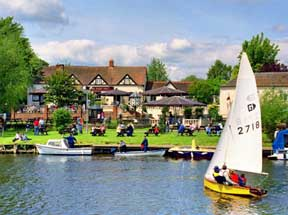
The Fleet Inn

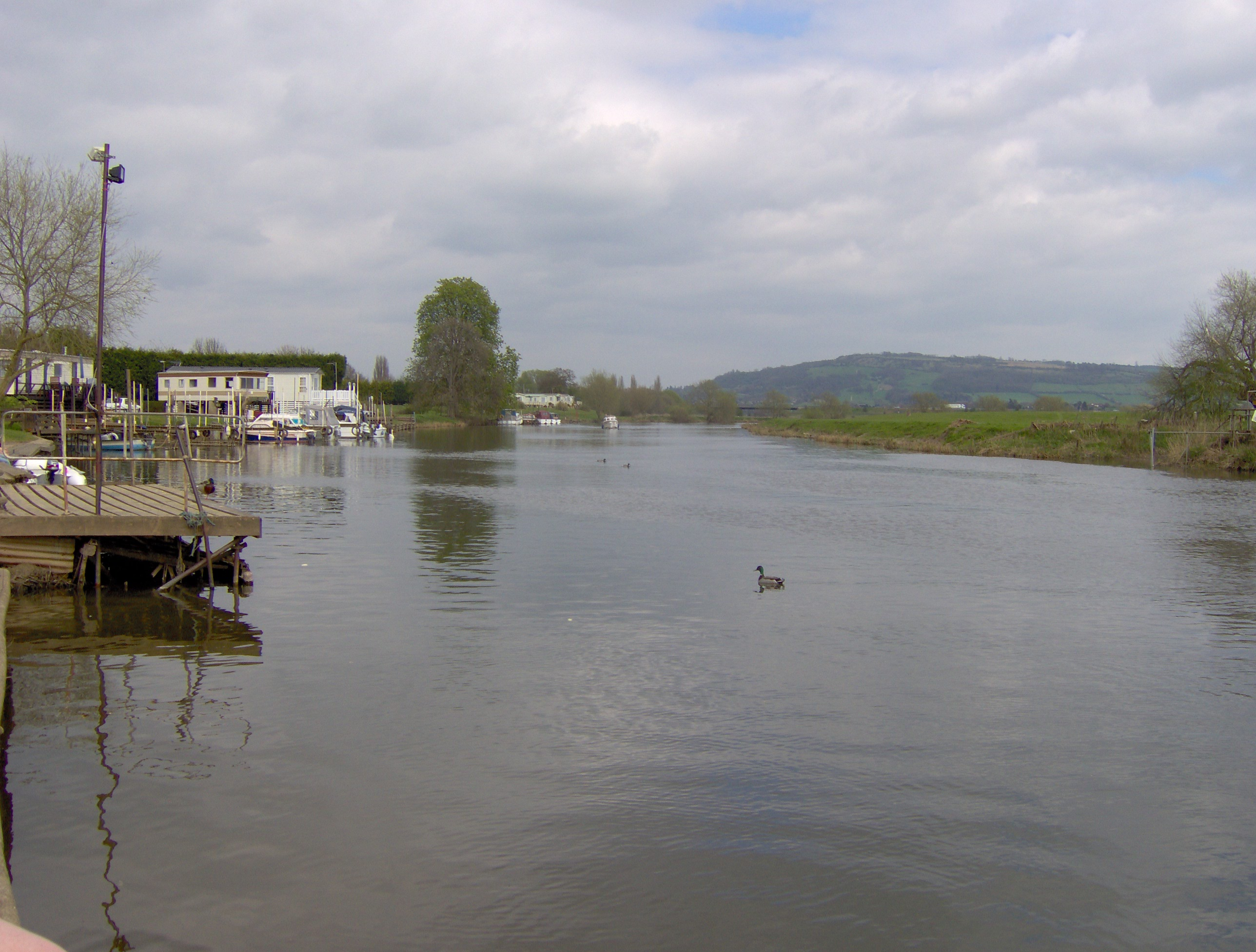
The River Avon seen from the garden of the Fleet Inn.

Twyning is a village and civil parish on the River Avon in the north of Gloucestershire, near Tewkesbury, England. The parish is first mentioned in the Liber Wigorniensis in about 1016, where it is called Tuinaeum, part of Gretestane in the county of Winchcombeshire and then mentioned in Domesday Book, described as "Tu(e)ninge, Kings Land : Winchcombe Abbey." The name derives from the Old English for "between the rivers"; despite its spelling, it is pronounced "twinning". The parish forms a land 'isthmus' into the county of Worcestershire.

The village is divided into two main parts, the older "Churchend", and "Twyning Green". In addition, within the parish are the hamlets of Shuthonger which straddles the A38, Woodend, Hillend and Stratford Bridge on the border with Worcestershire. It has two pubs, The Fleet at Twyning by the river and the Village Inn overlooking the village green. Boats have traditionally ferried people up the river Avon from Tewkesbury to enjoy the Fleet's hospitality. The service operates during summer months. The parish contains large amounts of common land including Brockeridge Common, and extensive meadows bordering the River Avon.

There is also a Spar shop which houses a post office, and a primary school of approximately 150 pupils. There are still a number of original black and white Tudor houses.

There is recreation complex called TRAC, that contains a park, three tennis courts, a 5-a-side football pitch and a pavilion. The village is fortunate to escape the floods that regularly blight this area, as it is situated on a slope up from the river. However, some properties (especially the riverside Fleet Inn) were affected in the great flood of 2007. The village is surrounded by fishing lakes and various places on the river for anglers.

== Twyning Ferry ==
The village had been a crossing point on the River Avon since medieval times. The ferry service, which was an entitlement given to the riverside innkeeper, was protected in law in Court Rolls since the time of Henry VIII. The landlord was permitted to collect tolls from those wanting to cross the river. However, in 1963, the pub's new landlord halted the ancient ferry service claiming it was too dangerous to run (https://bbcrewind.co.uk/asset/600598f70265c00027a1cb98). Despite opposition from villagers, the local parish council, district council and his statutory obligation enshrined in law, the ferry service ceased to operate. In 1996, the ferry was briefly reinstated by the pub's current landlords.

== Places of worship ==
The older part of the village, Churchend, contains the village church which is dedicated to St Mary Magdalene.

Twyning Chapel is located in the main part of the village.

== Governance ==
An electoral ward of the same name exists. This stretches south from Twyning almost to Tewkesbury. The total population of this ward taken at the 2011 census was 1,668.

== Surname ==
It is thought that the Twining surname is descended from, or at least connected to, the name of the village. There are records of John Twynyng of Tewkesbury making a will in 1412, and a John Twynnyng of Cirencester being sued for a debt in 1483. A 15th century Abbot at Winchcombe Abbey, which is also in Gloucestershire, was called John Twining.

The tea merchants, Twinings, are also thought to originate in Twyning. A branch of the family removed themselves to Painswick in the early Middle Ages and worked in the wool trade. In the 17th century Thomas Twining moved to London during a period of economic depression and began his tea business.
