= Sir Richard Martin, 1st Baronet, of Overbury Court =

British politician (1838-1916)

Sir Richard Biddulph Martin Bt
- Martin in 1895

Member of Parliament for Tewkesbury
- In office 1880–1885
- Preceded by: William Edwin Price
- Succeeded by: John Reginald Yorke

Member of Parliament for Droitwich
- In office 1892–1906
- Preceded by: John Corbett
- Succeeded by: Cecil Harmsworth

Prime Warden of the Worshipful Company of Fishmongers
- In office 1899–1900
- Succeeded by: George Frederick Bodley

Personal details
- Born: 12 May 1838
- Died: 23 August 1916 (aged 78)
- Party: Liberal; Liberal Unionist
- Relatives: John Biddulph Martin (brother)
- Education: Harrow School
- Alma mater: Exeter College, Oxford

Sir Richard Biddulph Martin, 1st Baronet (12 May 1838 – 23 August 1916) was an English banker and Liberal Party (and later Liberal Unionist) politician.

Martin was the older of two sons of Robert Martin (1808–1897) of Overbury Court near Tewkesbury in Gloucestershire and his wife, Mary Ann (d. 1892), who was the daughter of John Biddulph of the banking firm of Cocks, Biddulph & Co. His younger brother John Biddulph Martin was also a banker and statistician. Robert Martin was a partner of the Grasshopper Bank, which later became Martins Bank.

He was educated at Harrow School and at Exeter College, Oxford, before joining his maternal grandfather's bank. He later became one of the founders of the British North Borneo Company and of the Institute of Bankers.

Martin first stood for election to the House of Commons at the 1868 general election, when he was an unsuccessful candidate in the Eastern division of Worcestershire. He was unsuccessful again in next candidacy, at the 1880 general election in the City of London.

However, 3 months later he was elected as Member of Parliament (MP) for Tewkesbury at a by-election held in July 1880 after the result of the general election in April was overturned on petition. Several of his ancestors had held the seat in the past, but Richard was the last Martin to represent Tewkesbury. The Parliamentary Borough of Tewkesbury was abolished under the Reform Act 1885 and replaced with a wider county division of Gloucestershire.

At the 1885 general election, he did not stand for re-election in the new Tewkesbury division of Gloucestershire, contesting instead the Chelmsford division of Essex, but without success.

When the Liberal Party split over Irish Home Rule, he joined the breakaway Liberal Unionist Party, and stood as a Liberal Unionist in the Ashburton division of Devon, again without success. He finally returned to Parliament at the 1892 general election as MP for the Droitwich division of Worcestershire, replacing the Liberal Unionist John Corbett, who had retired. Martin remained Droitwich's MP until he stood down at the 1906 general election.

He was made a baronet on 12 December 1905, of Overbury Court, in Gloucestershire. He died childless, and the title became extinct on his death.

He was Prime Warden of the Fishmongers' Company from 1899 to 1900, and President of the Royal Statistical Society from 1906 to 1907.

Parliament of the United Kingdom
Preceded by William Edwin Price	Member of Parliament for Tewkesbury; 1880 – 1885	Succeeded by John Reginald Yorke
Preceded by John Corbett	Member of Parliament for Droitwich; 1892 – 1906	Succeeded by Cecil Harmsworth
Baronetage of the United Kingdom
New creation	Baronet (of Overbury Court, Gloucestershire); 1905–1916	Extinct
Preceded by Ellerman baronets	Martin baronets of Overbury Court; 12 December 1905	Succeeded by Cohen baronets
