= John Yorke (Conservative politician) =

English landowner and politician (1836-1912)

John Reginald Yorke DL
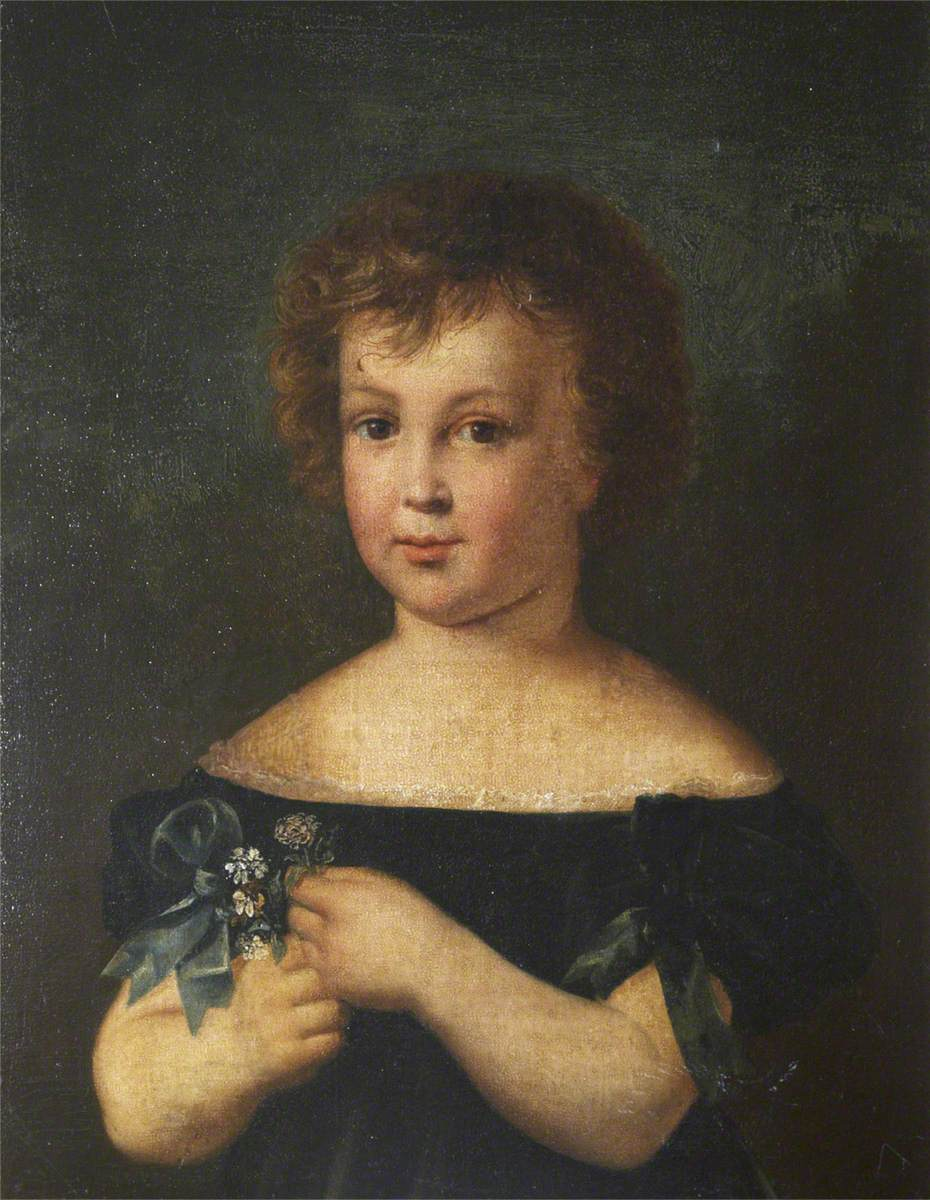
- John Yorke - as a small child

Member of Parliament for Tewkesbury
- In office 1864–1868 Serving with James Martin (1864–1865); William Dowdeswell (1865–1866); Sir Edmund Lechmere, Bt (1866–1868)
- Preceded by: Hon. Frederick Lygon; James Martin
- Succeeded by: William Edwin Price

Member of Parliament for East Gloucestershire
- In office 1872–1885 Serving with Sir Michael Hicks Beach, Bt
- Preceded by: Sir Michael Hicks Beach, Bt; Robert Stayner Holford
- Succeeded by: Constituency abolished

Member of Parliament for Tewkesbury
- In office 1885–1886
- Preceded by: Richard Martin
- Succeeded by: John Dorington

High Sheriff of Gloucestershire
- In office 1892–1893
- Preceded by: Edward Aldam Leatham
- Succeeded by: Sir William Guise, Bt

Personal details
- Born: 25 January 1836 Marylebone, London, England
- Died: 2 March 1912 (aged 76)
- Party: Conservative
- Spouse(s): Augusta Emmiline Monteath Douglas (m. 1862; died 1863) Sophia Matilda de Tuyll de Serooskerken (m. 1868)
- Children: 5
- Parents: Joseph Yorke (father); Frances Antonia Pole-Carew (mother)
- Relatives: Reginald Pole-Carew (maternal grandfather); Charles Lyttleton (cousin); Vincent Yorke (son); Henry Vincent Yorke (grandson)
- Education: Eton College
- Alma mater: Balliol College, Oxford

John Reginald Yorke (25 January 1836 – 2 March 1912) was an English landowner and Conservative politician who sat in the House of Commons between 1864 and 1886.

== Background and education ==
A member of the Yorke family headed by the Earl of Hardwicke, he was born in Marylebone, London, the son of Joseph Yorke, of Forthampton Court, Gloucestershire and his wife Frances Antonia, daughter of Reginald Pole-Carew. He was educated at Eton and Balliol College, Oxford. Yorke was a second cousin of Charles Lyttleton, 5th Baron Lyttleton, whose mother dowager Lady Lyttelton referred to Yorke as "tall and magnificent and promising as ever".

== Political career ==
Yorke was elected Member of Parliament (MP) for Tewkesbury in 1864, but in 1868 representation for the seat was reduced to one member. He was elected MP for East Gloucestershire between 1872 and held the seat until it was abolished in 1885. He was then elected M.P. for Tewkesbury again in 1885 until 1886. He was a Justice of the Peace for Gloucestershire and Worcestershire, and in 1892 he was High Sheriff of Gloucestershire. He was also a Deputy Lieutenant of Worcestershire and captain in the Tewkesbury Rifle Volunteers. He was also a Fellow of the Geological Society. Yorke died at the age of 76.

== Family ==
Yorke married Augusta Emmeline Monteath Douglas, the daughter of General Sir Thomas Monteath Douglas at St Paul's Church, Knightsbridge on 4 March 1862. They had a son but Augusta died on 19 February 1863, aged just 22. He married, secondly, to Sophia Matilda de Tuyll de Serooskerken, daughter of Baron Vincent de Tuyll de Serooskerken, on 11 January 1868 and they had four children. His son Vincent Wodehouse Yorke was the father of Henry Vincent Yorke, better known as the novelist Henry Green. Another son, Ralph Maximilian Yorke, reached the rank of brigadier-general during the First World War.

Parliament of the United Kingdom
Preceded by Hon. Frederick Lygon; James Martin	Member of Parliament for Tewkesbury; 1864 – 1868; With: James Martin 1864–1865; William Dowdeswell 1865–1866; Sir Edmund Lechmere, Bt 1866–1868	Succeeded by William Edwin Price
Preceded by Sir Michael Hicks Beach, Bt; Robert Stayner Holford	Member of Parliament for East Gloucestershire; 1872–1885; With: Sir Michael Hicks Beach, Bt	Constituency abolished
Preceded by Richard Martin	Member of Parliament for Tewkesbury; 1885–1886	Succeeded by John Dorington
Honorary titles
Preceded by Edward Aldam Leatham	High Sheriff of Gloucestershire; 1892–1893	Succeeded by Sir William Guise, Bt
