= Sir Edmund Lechmere, 3rd Baronet =

British politician (1826-1894)

Sir Edmund Lechmere Bt
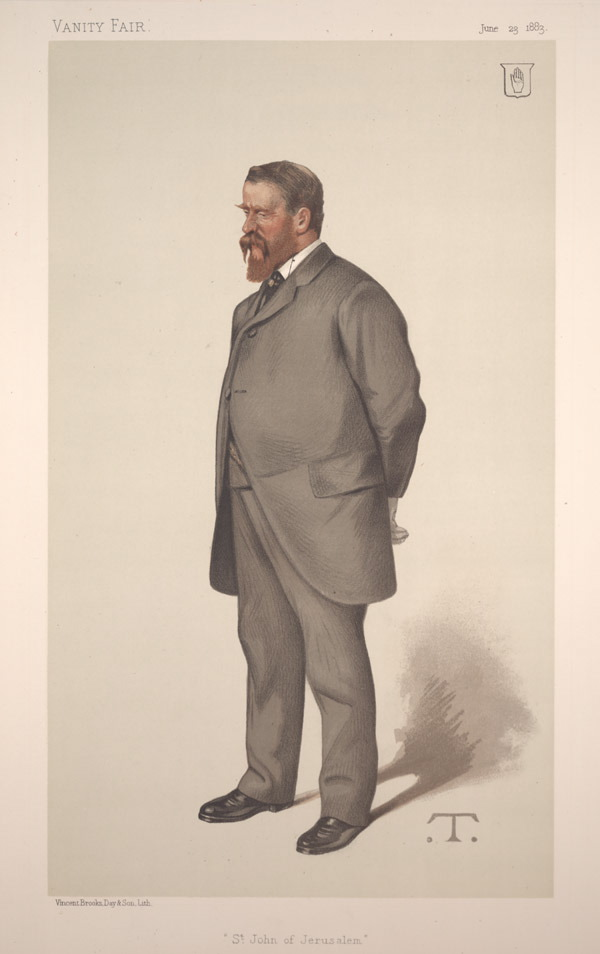
- "St John of Jerusalem". Caricature by T published in Vanity Fair in 1883.

Member of Parliament for Tewkesbury
- In office 1866–1868
- Preceded by: John Yorke; William Edward Dowdeswell
- Succeeded by: William Edwin Price

Member of Parliament for West Worcestershire
- In office 1876–1885
- Preceded by: Fredrick Knight; William Edward Dowdeswell

Member of Parliament for Bewdley
- In office 1885–1892
- Preceded by: Enoch Baldwin
- Succeeded by: Alfred Baldwin

Member of Parliament for Evesham
- In office 1892–1895
- Preceded by: Sir Richard Temple, Bt
- Succeeded by: Charles Wigram Long

Personal details
- Born: 8 December 1826 Hanley Castle, Worcestershire, England
- Died: 18 December 1894 (aged 68)
- Relatives: Alexander Murray (great uncle)
- Education: Charterhouse School
- Alma mater: Christ Church, Oxford

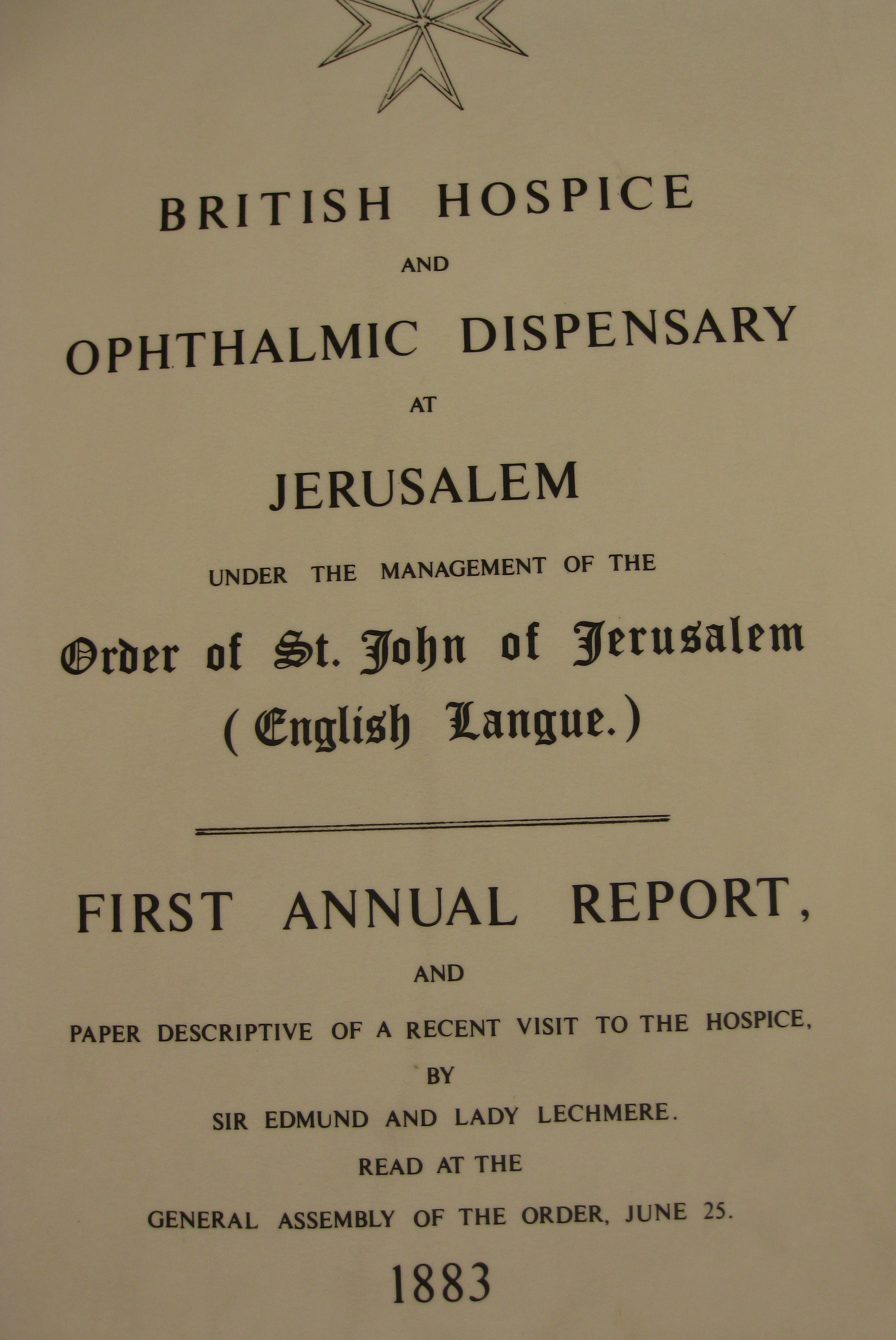
The St John of Jerusalem Eye Hospital first annual report 1883

Sir Edmund Anthony Harley Lechmere, 3rd Baronet (8 December 1826 – 18 December 1894) was a British Conservative Party politician who sat in the House of Commons between 1866 and 1895. He was a pioneer of the Red Cross.

== Family ==
Lechmere was the son of Sir Edmund Hungerford Lechmere, 2nd Baronet of Hanley Castle, Worcestershire and his wife Maria Clara Murray, daughter of Hon. David Murray, brother of Alexander Murray, 7th Lord Elibank. He was educated at Charterhouse School and Christ Church, Oxford. In 1852 he inherited the baronetcy on the death of his father. He was a senior partner in the Worcester Old Bank. In 1862 he was High Sheriff of Worcestershire.

Through his second son, Anthony Hungerford Lechmere (1868-1954), Edmund was the father-in-law of Cecily Mary Bridges (1884-1964) whose first husband, William George Lupton (1871-1911) of The Green Estate, Bromyard was, like Edmund, "a strong Conservative and took a keen interest in local (Worcester) politics" and hunting. Like his father, Anthony Hungerford Lechmere enjoyed (fox) hunting. Anthony and Cecily were the parents of Sir Reginald Anthony Hungerford Lechmere, 7th Baronet (1920-2010), a grandson of Sir Edmund Lechmere, 3rd Baronet.

Lechmere married Louisa Katherine Haigh (1837–1904), only daughter and heiress of John or Joseph Haigh of Whitwell Hall at York, on 30 September 1858. Lady Lechmere's father was the son of a wealthy textile merchant with origins in Golcar. He was born at Spring Grove, Huddersfield in 1805. (See here for Haigh's will.)

== Politics and interests ==
In March 1866 Lechmere was elected at a by-election as one of the two Members of Parliament (MPs) for Tewkesbury, but when the borough's representation was reduced to one seat at the 1868 general election, he was defeated by the Liberal Party candidate William Edwin Price. He contested Tewkesbury again in 1874, without success, but in July 1876 he was elected at a by-election as MP for Western Worcestershire. After the Redistribution of Seats Act 1885, he was elected at the 1885 general election as MP for Bewdley. He held the seat until the 1892 general election, when he was elected as MP for Evesham. He held that seat until his death.

Lechmere gave an annual prize for history at the Oxford Military College in Cowley from 1876 to 1896.

Lechmere and his wife were among the founders of Venerable Order of St John. They had travelled several times to Jerusalem and were involved in the establishment of The St John of Jerusalem Eye Hospital.

In 1905, London's Illustrated Sporting and Dramatic News highlighted the exploits experienced and many trophies Sir Edmund and Lady Lechmere had won whilst game hunting.

Parliament of the United Kingdom
Preceded by John Yorke; William Edward Dowdeswell	Member of Parliament for Tewkesbury; 1866–1868; With: John Yorke	Succeeded by William Edwin Price
Preceded by Fredrick Knight and William Edward Dowdeswell	Member of Parliament for West Worcestershire; 1876–1885; With: Fredrick Knight	Constituency abolished
Preceded by Enoch Baldwin	Member of Parliament for Bewdley; 1885–1892	Succeeded by Alfred Baldwin
Preceded by Sir Richard Temple, Bt	Member of Parliament for Evesham; 1892–1894	Succeeded by Charles Wigram Long
Baronetage of the United Kingdom
Preceded by Edmund Hungerford Lechmere	Baronet (of The Rhydd); 1856–1894	Succeeded by Edmund Arthur Lechmere
