= William Edwin Price =

English politician (1841–1886)

Member of Parliament for Tewkesbury
- In office 1868–1880
- Preceded by: John Yorke; Sir Edmund Lechmere, Bt
- Succeeded by: Richard Martin

Personal details
- Born: 10 January 1841
- Died: 10 February 1886 (aged 45)
- Party: Liberal
- Parents: William Philip Price (father); Frances Ann Chadborn (mother)
- Relatives: Morgan Philips Price (son)
- Education: Eton College
- Alma mater: University College London; Royal Military Academy, Woolwich
- Military career
- Allegiance: United Kingdom
- Branch: British Army
- Rank: Captain
- Units: 36th Regiment of Foot; Royal South Gloucester Militia; 3rd Gloucester City Rifle Volunteers

William Edwin Price (10 January 1841 – 10 February 1886) was an English Liberal Party politician who sat in the House of Commons from 1868 to 1880.

Price was the son of William Philip Price, M.P. for Gloucester and his wife Frances Ann Chadborn, daughter of John Chadborn of Gloucester. He was educated at Eton College, at University College London graduating BA in 1859, and at the Royal Military Academy, Woolwich. He served in the 36th Regiment of Foot until his retirement in February 1865. He was a captain of the Royal South Gloucester Militia, and of the 3rd Gloucester City Rifle Volunteers.

At the 1868 general election Price was elected as the member of parliament for the borough of Tewkesbury. He was re-elected in 1874 and at the general election in April 1880 but his election was declared void on 29 June 1880.

Price died at the age of 45.

His son Morgan Philips Price was later a (Labour) M.P.

Parliament of the United Kingdom
Preceded by John Yorke; Sir Edmund Lechmere, Bt	Member of Parliament for Tewkesbury; 1868 – 1880	Succeeded by Richard Martin
