= Sir Anthony Lechmere, 1st Baronet =

British baronet

Sir Anthony Lechmere, 1st Baronet (2 November 1766 – 25 March 1849) was an English banker.

== Life ==
He was the son of Edmund Lechmere MP and his second wife Elizabeth, daughter of Rev. John Whitmore. He matriculated at Merton College, Oxford in 1785 aged 18.

Lechmere was Receiver general for Worcestershire, and a banker. He was created a baronet on 10 December 1818.

On 21 November 1836, Lechmere was awarded compensation of £4089 10s 3d for 286 slaves on the Virgin Islands. His father-in-law Joseph Berwick had a mortgage over the plantation.

== Family ==
Lechmere married firstly Mary Berwick, daughter of Joseph Berwick, on 15 May 1787. They had the following children:

- an unknown daughter
- an unknown daughter
- Eliza Anne Lechmere (1789–1875)
- Sir Edmund Hungerford Lechmere, 2nd Bt. (25 May 1792–1856)
- Rev. Anthony Berwick Lechmere (1802–1878)
- Emma Catherine Lechmere (1809–1885)

He married secondly Eleanor Villiers, daughter of Bayley Villiers, on 8 September 1823. They had one son:

- William Henry Lechmere (1825–1857)

Baronetage of the United Kingdom
| New creation | Baronet (of The Rhydd); 1818–1849 | Succeeded by Edmund Hungerford Lechmere |
