= Charles Fox (socialist activist) =

British socialist activist and dentist

Charles Herbert Fox (1861 – 1939) was a British socialist activist and dentist.

Born in Gloucester, the son of a dentist, Fox studied at Sidcot School. His father died when he was fifteen, and he worked as a building supplies manufacturer. However, his health broke down when he was twenty, and the co-operative advocate Samuel Saunders helped him recuperate with gentle work on a smallholding. This led Fox to support the Whiteway Colony, and also to become a vegetarian.

In the 1890s, Fox moved back to Gloucester, where he qualified as a dentist, and also attended to the health of residents during a smallpox epidemic. He stood unsuccessfully for the Labour Party in Tewkesbury at the January 1910 general election, and was also active in the Independent Labour Party.

Fox stood again for Labour at the 1931 general election, this time in Gloucester, but was again unsuccessful. He died in 1939.
