= Charles Hanbury-Tracy, 1st Baron Sudeley =

British politician and peer (1778–1858)

The Right Honourable The Lord Sudeley
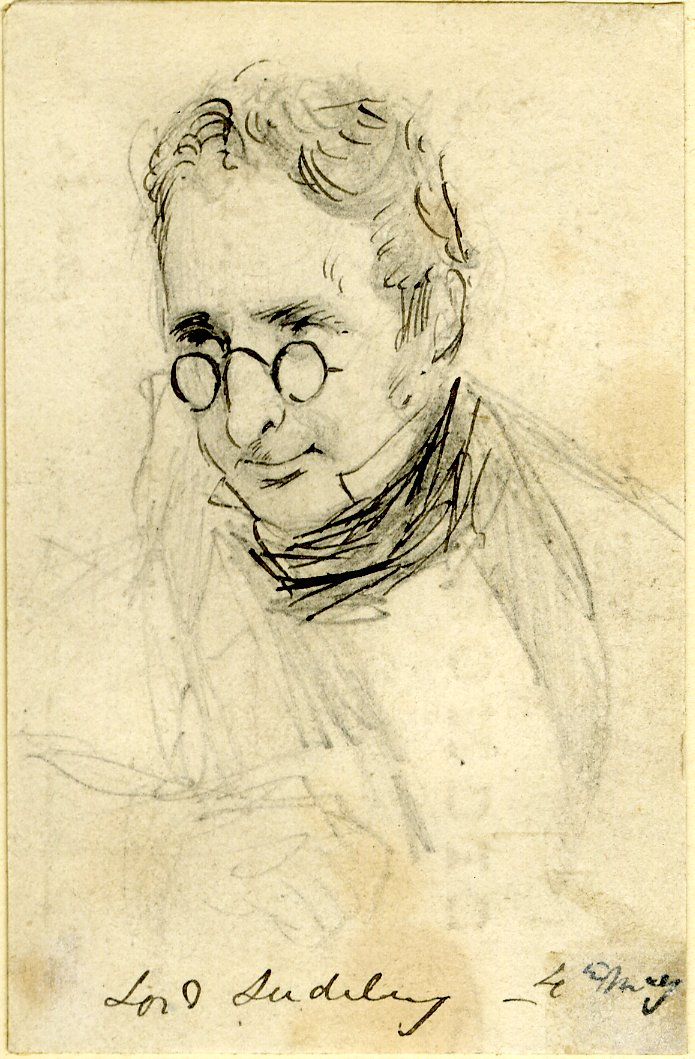
- Charles Hanbury-Tracy, 1st Baron Sudeley by Daniel Macdonald

Lord-Lieutenant of Montgomeryshire
- In office 1848–1858
- Monarch: Victoria
- Preceded by: The Earl of Powis
- Succeeded by: The Lord Sudeley

Personal details
- Born: Charles Hanbury; 28 December 1778
- Died: 10 February 1858 (aged 79)
- Party: Whigs
- Spouse: Henrietta Susanna Tracy
- Children: 3
- Parent: John Hanbury
- Education: Rugby School
- Alma mater: Christ Church, Oxford
- Occupation: Aristocrat, politician

Charles Hanbury-Tracy, 1st Baron Sudeley (28 December 1778 – 10 February 1858), known as Charles Hanbury until 1798 and as Charles Hanbury Tracy from 1798 to 1838, was a British Whig politician.

== Early life ==
Hanbury-Tracy was born on 28 December 1778. He was the third son of John Hanbury of Pontypool Park in Monmouthshire. The family derived its wealth from its ownership of the Pontypool Ironworks. He was educated at Rugby School (1790) and matriculated at Christ Church, Oxford on 1 February 1796.

== Career ==
Hanbury-Tracy was appointed High Sheriff of Gloucestershire for 1800–01 and High Sheriff of Montgomeryshire for 1804–05. He was elected to the House of Commons for Tewkesbury in 1807 in the Whig interest, a seat he held until 1812 and again from 1832 to 1837.

Hanbury-Tracy served as the Chairman of the Commission to judge the designs for the new Houses of Parliament in 1835. In 1838 Hanbury-Tracy was raised to the peerage as Baron Sudeley, of Toddington in the County of Gloucester. He later served as Lord Lieutenant of Montgomeryshire between 1848 and 1858.

== Personal life and death ==
Hanbury-Tracy married his cousin the Hon. Henrietta Susanna Tracy, on 29 December 1798; she was the only child of Henry Leigh Tracy, 8th Viscount Tracy and his wife Susannah Weaver. Five days before their marriage he assumed by Royal licence the additional surname of Tracy.

Through this marriage, the ancient estate of Toddington Manor in Gloucestershire came into the Hanbury family. Lord Sudeley at first had the original house renovated, but later constructed a new house in Gothic style nearby. Later still in the 1840s he was responsible for the rebuilding of Gregynog Hall in Montgomeryshire.

Lady Sudeley died on 5 June 1839. Lord Sudeley survived her by 19 years and died in February 1858, aged 79. He was succeeded in the barony by his son Thomas, who also succeeded him as Lord Lieutenant of Montgomeryshire. Sudeley's younger son the Honourable Henry was a politician. They had issue:

- Hon Henrietta Hanbury-Tracy
- Thomas Hanbury-Tracy, 2nd Baron Sudeley
- Hon Henry Hanbury-Tracy (1802–1889), MP for Bridgnorth

Hanbury-Tracy died on 10 February 1858.

== Arms ==
Coat of arms of Charles Hanbury-Tracy, 1st Baron Sudeley
Crest "1st, on a chapeau gules, turned up ermine, an escallop sable, between two wings or; 2nd, out of a mural coronet sable, a demi-lion rampant or, holding in the paws a battle-axe sable, helved gold." Escutcheon "Quarterly: 1st and 4th or, an escallop in the chief point sable, between two bendlets gules (Tracy); 2nd and 3rd or, a bend engrailed vert plain cotised sable" (Hanbury). Supporters "On either side a falcon, wings elevated proper, beaked and belled or." Motto Memoria Pii Æterna "The pious are held in everlasting remembrance" Badge "A fire beacon, and in front thereof and chained thereto a panther ducally gorged, the tail nowed".

== Notes ==
Parliament of the United Kingdom
Preceded by James Martin; Christopher Bethell-Codrington	Member of Parliament for Tewkesbury; 1807–1812; With: Christopher Bethell-Codrington	Succeeded by John Edmund Dowdeswell; John Martin
Preceded by John Edmund Dowdeswell; John Martin	Member of Parliament for Tewkesbury; 1832–1837; With: John Edmund Dowdeswell 1832; John Martin 1832–1835; William Dowdeswell 1835–1837	Succeeded by William Dowdeswell; John Martin
Honorary titles
Preceded by The Earl of Powis	Lord-Lieutenant of Montgomeryshire; 1848–1858	Succeeded by The Lord Sudeley
Peerage of the United Kingdom
New creation	Baron Sudeley; 1837–1858	Succeeded by Thomas Charles Hanbury-Tracy
