= John Martin (1805–1880) =

British Whig politician

Member of Parliament for Tewkesbury
- In office 25 July 1837 – 29 April 1859 Serving with Frederick Lygon (1857–1859); Humphrey Brown (1847–1857); William Dowdeswell (1837–1847)
- Preceded by: William Dowdeswell; Charles Hanbury-Tracy
- Succeeded by: Frederick Lygon; James Martin
- In office 12 December 1832 – 6 January 1835 Serving with Charles Hanbury-Tracy
- Preceded by: John Edmund Dowdeswell; Charles Hanbury-Tracy
- Succeeded by: William Dowdeswell; Charles Hanbury-Tracy

Personal details
- Born: 1805
- Died: 7 March 1880 (aged 74)
- Party: Whig

John Martin (1805 – 7 March 1880) was a British Whig politician.

John Martin was first elected Whig MP for Tewkesbury at the 1832 general election but lost the seat at the next general election in 1835. However, he regained the seat in 1837 and held the seat until he stood down in 1859.

Martin's family were well-known in the Tewkesbury area. His father John, was also a Whig MP for the seat from 1812 to 1832 while his brother James became Liberal MP immediately after he stepped down in 1859.

Parliament of the United Kingdom
Preceded by William Dowdeswell; Charles Hanbury-Tracy	Member of Parliament for Tewkesbury; 1837–1859; With: Frederick Lygon (1857–1859); Humphrey Brown (1847–1857); William Dowdeswell (1837–1847)	Succeeded by Frederick Lygon; James Martin
Preceded by John Edmund Dowdeswell; Charles Hanbury-Tracy	Member of Parliament for Tewkesbury; 1832–1835; With: Charles Hanbury-Tracy	Succeeded by William Dowdeswell; Charles Hanbury-Tracy
