= William Dowdeswell (politician, born 1841) =

English Conservative politician

- Born: 13 June 1841
- Died: 12 July 1893 (aged 52)
- Spouse: Emily Parkyns (m. 1869)
- Father: William Dowdeswell

William Edward Dowdeswell (13 June 1841 – 12 July 1893) was an English Conservative politician who sat in the House of Commons between 1865 and 1876.

Dowdeswell was the son of William Dowdeswell of Pull Court and his wife Amelia Letitia Graham daughter of Robert Graham of Cossington Hall, Somerset. His father was MP for Tewkesbury from 1835 to 1842. He was educated at Westminster School and at Christ Church, Oxford. He was a J.P. for Worcestershire, and captain of Worcestershire Yeomanry Cavalry.

At the 1865 general election Dowdeswell was elected Member of Parliament for Tewkesbury which he held until March 1866. In 1866 he was elected MP for West Worcestershire and held the seat until 1876.

== Personal life and death ==
Dowdeswell married Emily Parkyns, daughter of Sir Thomas Parkyns, 6th Baronet in February 1869. Dowdeswell died on 12 July 1893; he was 52 years old.

Parliament of the United Kingdom
Preceded by James Martin; John Yorke	Member of Parliament for Tewkesbury; 1865 – 1866; With: John Yorke	Succeeded by Sir Edmund Lechmere; John Yorke
Preceded by Frederick Lygon; Frederick Knight	Member of Parliament for West Worcestershire; 1866 – 1876; With: Frederick Knight	Succeeded by Sir Edmund Lechmere; Frederick Knight
