= 1831 United Kingdom general election =

- 28 April – 1 June 1831

All 658 seats in the House of Commons 330 seats needed for a majority
- Registered: About 516,000 (Note: Out of a population of about 24,000,000)
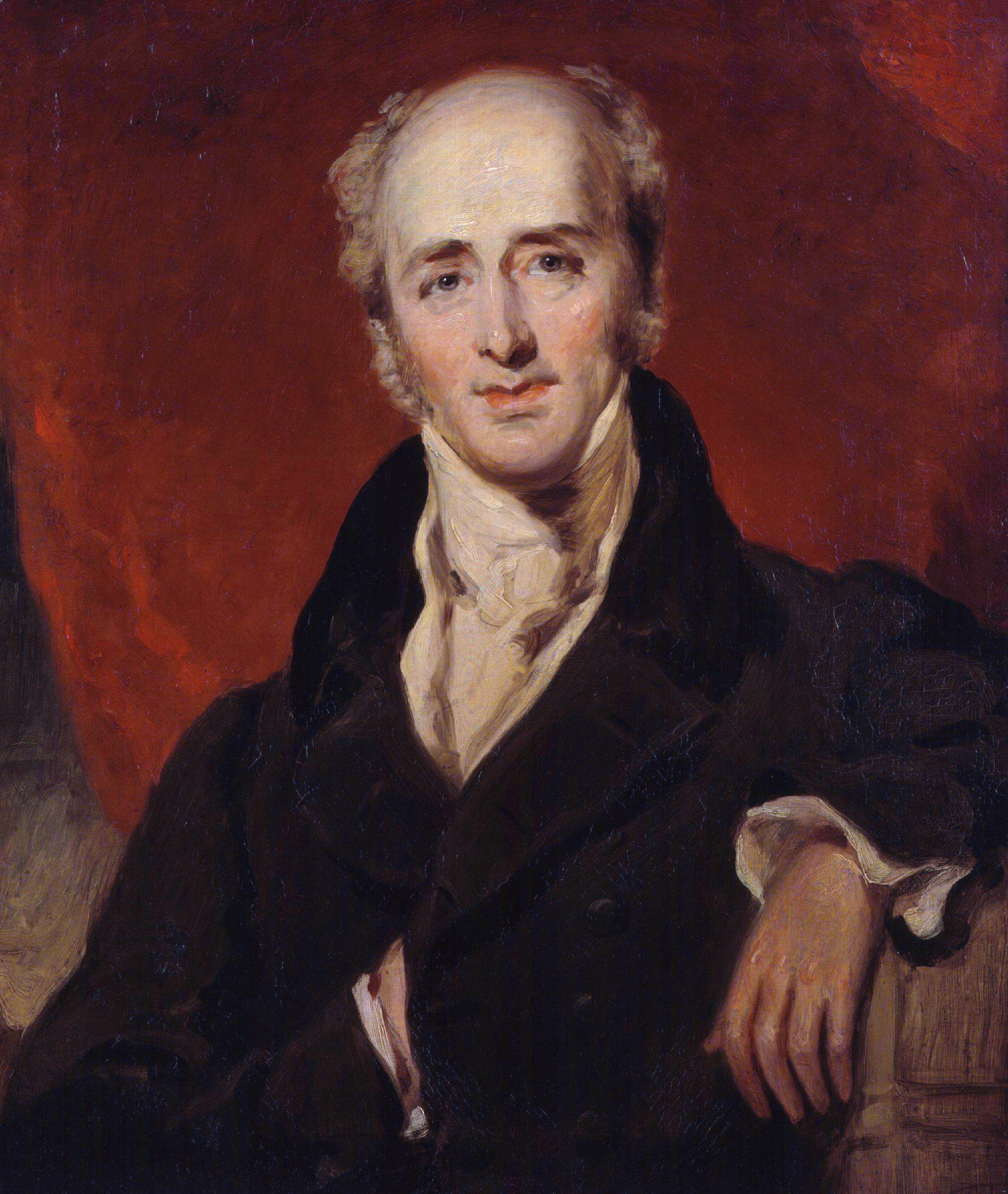

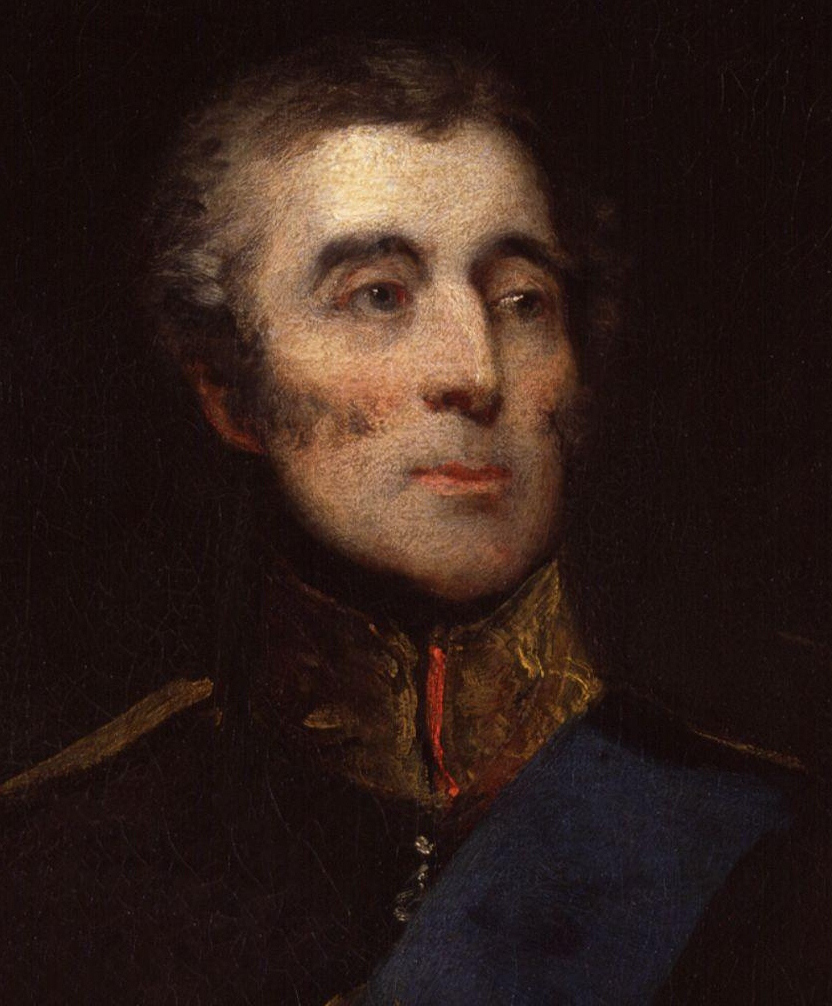
	First party	Second party
Leader	Earl Grey	Duke of Wellington
Party	Whig	Tory
Leader since	22 November 1830	22 January 1828
Leader's seat	House of Lords	House of Lords
Last election	196 seats, 59.3%	250 seats, 38.4%
Seats won	370	235
Seat change	▲174	▼15
Popular vote	80,763	46,892
Percentage	63.3%	36.7%
Swing	▲4.0 pp	▼1.7 pp
- Results of the general election

- Composition of the House of Commons after the general election
Prime Minister before election
Earl Grey
Whig
Prime Minister after election
Earl Grey
Whig

The 1831 United Kingdom general election was held from 28 April 1831 to 1 June 1831. With electoral reform becoming a major issue, the Whigs under Prime Minister Earl Grey won a decisive victory with a majority of 82 seats. This was the last election before the Reform Act 1832.

== Political situation ==
The ninth UK Parliament elected in 1830 lacked a stable Commons majority for the Tory government of the Duke of Wellington: the best estimate is that it had 310 supporters, 225 opponents and 121 doubtful. After a series of defeats, on 15 November 1830 Henry Parnell's motion for an inquiry into the civil list was carried by 233 to 204; this defeat surprised Wellington and his cabinet and forced their resignation. Wellington went into opposition, with Sir Robert Peel as the Tory Leader of the Opposition in the Commons. A Whig government under Earl Grey was appointed on 22 November 1830, the first since the Ministry of all the Talents in 1806–07. The government's Leader of the House of Commons was Viscount Althorp, who also served as Chancellor of the Exchequer.

Grey was determined to bring in reform to the traditional electoral system, which had been discussed for many decades. With aristocratic colleagues he produced a surprisingly bold scheme of reform; the second reading of the Reform Bill was carried by only one vote (302–301) on 22 March 1831. The Tory opposition was determined to stop the scheme going ahead, and when the Bill went into committee on 18 April, General Gascoyne moved an amendment which required that the total number of MPs representing England and Wales ought not to be reduced. This proposal was a skilfully drafted 'wrecking amendment' and when it was passed by 299–291 on 19 April, the Grey government knew it would not get its legislation. In truth Grey had been ready to ask for a dissolution immediately when the Committee stage began, and King William IV reluctantly agreed; the King dissolved Parliament in person (amid a great political tumult) on 22 April.

The new Parliament was summoned to meet on 14 June 1831, for a maximum seven-year term from that date.

== Dates of election ==
At this period there was not one election day. After receiving a writ (a royal command) for the election to be held, the local returning officer fixed the election timetable for the particular constituency or constituencies he was concerned with. Polling in seats with contested elections could continue for many days.

The general election took place between the first contest on 28 April and the last contest on 1 June 1831.

== Summary of the constituencies ==
Monmouthshire (1 County constituency with 2 MPs and one single member Borough constituency) is included in Wales in these tables. Sources for this period may include the county in England.

Table 1: Constituencies and MPs, by type and country

Country	BC	CC	UC	Total C	BMP	CMP	UMP	Total MPs
England	201	39	2	242	402	80	4	486
Wales	13	13	0	26	13	14	0	27
Scotland	15	30	0	45	15	30	0	45
Ireland	33	32	1	66	35	64	1	100
Total	262	114	3	379	465	178	5	658

Table 2: Number of seats per constituency, by type and country

Country	BCx1	BCx2	BCx4	CCx1	CCx2	CCx4	UCx1	UCx2	Total C
England	4	195	2	0	38	1	0	2	242
Wales	13	0	0	12	1	0	0	0	26
Scotland	15	0	0	30	0	0	0	0	45
Ireland	31	2	0	0	32	0	1	0	66
Total	63	197	2	42	71	1	1	2	379

== See also ==
- United Kingdom general elections
- List of MPs elected in the 1831 United Kingdom general election

== Sources ==
- British Electoral Facts 1832–1999, compiled and edited by Colin Rallings and Michael Thrasher (Ashgate Publishing Ltd 2000). Source: Dates of Elections – Footnote to Table 5.02
- British Historical Facts 1760–1830, by Chris Cook and John Stevenson (The Macmillan Press 1980). Source: Types of constituencies – Great Britain
- His Majesty's Opposition 1714–1830, by Archibald S. Foord (Oxford University Press 1964)
- Parliamentary Election Results in Ireland 1801–1922, edited by B.M. Walker (Royal Irish Academy 1978). Source: Types of constituencies – Ireland
