= Tewkesbury (constituency) =

UK Parliament constituency (since 1997)

- County constituency for the House of Commons
- Interactive map of boundaries since 2024
- Boundary of Tewkesbury in South West England
- County: Gloucestershire
- Electorate: 72,426 (2023)
- Major settlements: Tewkesbury and Winchcombe

Current constituency
- Created: 1997
- Member of Parliament: Cameron Thomas (Independent)
- Seats: One
- Created from: Cirencester & Tewkesbury, Cheltenham and West Gloucestershire

1610–1918
- Seats: 1610–1868: Two; 1868–1918: One
- Type of constituency: Borough constituency
- Replaced by: Stroud, Forest of Dean and Cirencester & Tewkesbury

Tewkesbury is a constituency (Note: A county constituency (for the purposes of election expenses and type of returning officer)) in Gloucestershire represented in the House of Commons of the UK Parliament since 2024 by Cameron Thomas, who currently sits as an independent MP but was initially elected as a Liberal Democrat. (Note: As with all constituencies, the constituency elects one Member of Parliament (MP) by the first past the post system of election at least every five years.)

== Constituency profile ==
Tewkesbury

Tewkesbury is a constituency in Gloucestershire in South West England. It is named after its largest town, Tewkesbury, which has a population of around 15,000. Other settlements include the town of Winchcombe, the villages of Bishop's Cleeve, Northway and Woodmancote, and some outer suburbs of Cheltenham (Prestbury, Wyman's Brook and Arle) and Gloucester (Innsworth and Longlevens).

This constituency covers the mostly rural towns and villages to the north of Cheltenham and Gloucester. The east of the constituency around Winchcombe is within the Cotswolds, a range of rolling hills popular with tourists. Tewkesbury is a historic market town known for its 12th-century abbey. This constituency is mostly affluent, especially so in Longlevens, Prestbury and Bishop's Cleeve; many residents here live in large detached and semi-detached properties. House prices across the constituency are generally similar to the regional and UK averages.

This constituency has an above-average retired population and a low proportion of young adults. Residents have high levels of income and homeownership and the child poverty rate is low. They generally have average levels of education and a high proportion work in the manufacturing and retail sectors. The percentage of residents claiming unemployment benefits is low. White people made up 94% of the population at the 2021 census.

At the local council level, most of this constituency is represented by Liberal Democrats with some Conservatives elected in the rural villages and some Reform UK and Green Party councillors elected in Tewkesbury town. An estimated 54% of voters in this constituency supported leaving the European Union in the 2016 referendum, marginally higher than the UK-wide figure of 52%.

== History ==
=== 1610 to 1918 ===
Tewkesbury existed in this period, first in the parliamentary borough form. It returned two MPs until this was reduced to one in 1868, then saw itself become instead a larger county division under the Redistribution of Seats Act 1885, before it was abolished in 1918.

Prominent politicians

- William Dowdeswell was Chancellor of the Exchequer for two years under Rockingham, and his short tenure of this position appears to have been a successful one, he being in Lecky's words a good financier, but nothing more. To general astonishment, he refused to abandon his friends and to take an office under The 1st Earl of Chatham ("Pitt the Elder"), who succeeded Rockingham in August 1766. Dowdeswell then led the Rockingham party in the House of Commons, taking an active part in debate until his death. In 1774 he warned MPs against passing the Boston Port Act, related to the later Boston Tea Party.
- Charles Hanbury-Tracy was heir to much of the Pontypool part the growing iron industry and served as the chairman of the commission of 1835 that commissioned the new Houses of Parliament and judged designs.
- After service for Tewkesbury Frederick Lygon, 6th Earl Beauchamp entered the Lords and then served in Cabinet positions under the earlier governments headed by Lord Salisbury, before the turn-of-the century third government.

=== 1997 to date ===
The Fourth periodic review of Westminster constituencies in 1997 saw the seat's recreation when the number of constituencies in Gloucestershire was increased from five to six. It was primarily formed from a minority of the larger county division Cirencester and Tewkesbury, together with parts of West Gloucestershire and Cheltenham.

== Boundaries ==
Map of 2010–2024 boundaries

1885–1918: The Municipal Boroughs of Gloucester and Tewkesbury, the Sessional Divisions of Berkeley, Cheltenham, Gloucester, Tewkesbury, and Winchcombe, part of the Sessional Division of Whitminster, and the parish of Slimbridge.

1997–2010: The Borough of Tewkesbury wards of Ashchurch, Bishop's Cleeve East, Bishop's Cleeve North, Bishop's Cleeve South, Brockworth Glebe, Brockworth Moorfield, Brockworth Westfield, Churchdown Brookfield, Churchdown Parton, Churchdown Pirton, Cleeve Hill, Coombe Hill, Crickley, De Winton, Dumbleton, Gotherington, Horsbere, Innsworth, Shurdington, Tewkesbury Mitton, Tewkesbury Newtown, Tewkesbury Prior's Park, Tewkesbury Town, Twyning, and Winchcombe, and the Borough of Cheltenham wards of Leckhampton with Up Hatherley, Prestbury, and Swindon.

2010–2024: The Borough of Tewkesbury wards of Ashchurch with Walton Cardiff, Badgeworth, Brockworth, Churchdown Brookfield, Churchdown St John's, Cleeve Grange, Cleeve Hill, Cleeve St Michael's, Cleeve West, Coombe Hill, Hucclecote, Innsworth with Down Hatherley, Isbourne, Northway, Oxenton Hill, Shurdington, Tewkesbury Newtown, Tewkesbury Prior's Park, Tewkesbury Town with Mitton, Twyning, and Winchcombe, the Borough of Cheltenham wards of Prestbury and Swindon Village, and the City of Gloucester ward of Longlevens.

2024–present: Further to the 2023 review of Westminster constituencies which came into effect for the 2024 general election, the constituency is composed of the following (as they existed on 1 December 2020):

- The Borough of Cheltenham wards of: Prestbury; Springbank; Swindon Village.
- The City of Gloucester wards of: Elmbridge; Longlevens.
- The Borough of Tewkesbury wards of: Cleeve Grange; Cleeve Hill; Cleeve St. Michael's; Cleeve West; Innsworth; Isbourne; Northway; Severn Vale North; Severn Vale South; Tewkesbury East; Tewkesbury North & Twyning; Tewkesbury South; Winchcombe.

In order to bring the electorate within the permitted range, the area between the city of Gloucester and the town of Cheltenham, including the communities of Badgeworth, Brockworth, Churchdown and Shurdington, was included in the newly created constituency of North Cotswolds. To partly compensate, the Springbank and Elmbridge wards were transferred in from the Cheltenham and Gloucester seats respectively.

As its name suggests, the main town in the constituency is Tewkesbury, but other settlements include Twyning, Ashchurch, Bishop's Cleeve, Winchcombe, Prestbury, Swindon, Innsworth, Longlevens and Elmbridge.

== Members of Parliament ==
=== MPs 1610–1629 ===
- Constituency created (1610)

The constituency was enfranchised on 23 March 1610 – the first record of its members sworn is 16 April 1610.

Parliament	First member	Second member
Parliament of 1604–1611 (1610)	Sir Dudley Digges	Edward Ferrers
Addled Parliament (1614)	Sir Dudley Digges	Sir John Ratcliffe
Parliament of 1621–1622	Sir Dudley Digges	Giles Brydges
Happy Parliament (1624–1625)	Sir Dudley Digges	Sir Baptist Hicks
Useless Parliament (1625)	Sir Dudley Digges	Sir Baptist Hicks
Parliament of 1625–1626	Sir Dudley Digges	Sir Baptist Hicks
Parliament of 1628–1629	Sir Thomas Colepeper	Sir Baptist Hicks
May 1628	Sir Thomas Colepeper	Sir William Hicks

=== MPs 1640–1868 ===
Year	First member	First party	Second member	Second party
April 1640	Sir Anthony Ashley Cooper		Sir Edward Alford	
November 1640	Double return — election declared void			
August 1641	Sir Robert Cooke	Parliamentarian	Sir Edward Alford	Royalist
1641	Sir Robert Cooke	Parliamentarian	Edward Stephens	Parliamentarian
August 1643	Cooke died — seat left vacant		Edward Stephens	Parliamentarian
1645	John Stephens		Edward Stephens	Parliamentarian
December 1648	John Stephens		Edward Stephens excluded in Pride's Purge – seat vacant	
1653	Tewkesbury was unrepresented in the Barebones Parliament			
1654	Sir Anthony Ashley Cooper – chosen for Wiltshire – replaced by Francis St John		Tewkesbury had only one seat in the First and Second Parliaments of the Protectorate	
1656	Francis White		Tewkesbury had only one seat in the First and Second Parliaments of the Protectorate	
January 1659	Edward Cooke		Robert Long (Note: Cannot have been Sir Robert Long Bt as stated by Williams as he was a Royalist.)	
May 1659	Not represented in the restored Rump			
April 1660	(Sir) Henry Capell		Richard Dowdeswell	
1673	(Sir) Henry Capell		Sir Francis Russell	
1685	Richard Dowdeswell		Sir Francis Russell	
1690	Richard Dowdeswell		Sir Henry Capell	
1692	Richard Dowdeswell		Sir Francis Winnington	
1698	Richard Dowdeswell		Charles Hancock	
1701	Richard Dowdeswell		Edmund Bray	
1708	Richard Dowdeswell		Henry Ireton	
1710	William Bromley		Henry Ireton	
1712	William Bromley		William Dowdeswell	
1713	Charles Dowdeswell		William Dowdeswell	
1714	Anthony Lechmere		William Dowdeswell	
1717	Nicholas Lechmere		William Dowdeswell	
1721	The Viscount Gage (Note: of Castle Island, Ireland)		William Dowdeswell	
1722	The Viscount Gage		Brigadier George Reade	
1734	The Viscount Gage		Robert Tracy	
1741	The Viscount Gage		John Martin	
1747	The Viscount Gage		William Dowdeswell	Whig
1754	Nicolson Calvert		John Martin, junior	
1761	Nicolson Calvert	Whig	Sir William Codrington	Tory
1774	Joseph Martin	Whig	Sir William Codrington	Tory
1776	James Martin	Whig	Sir William Codrington	Tory
1792	James Martin	Whig	Lieutenant-Colonel William Dowdeswell	Tory
1797	James Martin	Whig	Christopher Bethell-Codrington	Tory
1807	Charles Hanbury-Tracy	Whig	Christopher Bethell-Codrington	Tory
1812	John Edmund Dowdeswell	Tory	John Martin	Whig
January 1832	John Edmund Dowdeswell	Tory	Charles Hanbury-Tracy	Whig
December 1832	John Martin	Whig	Charles Hanbury-Tracy	Whig
1835	William Dowdeswell	Conservative	Charles Hanbury-Tracy	Whig
1837	William Dowdeswell	Conservative	John Martin	Whig
1847	Humphrey Brown	Whig	John Martin	Whig
1857	Hon. Frederick Lygon	Conservative	John Martin	Whig
1859	Hon. Frederick Lygon	Conservative	James Martin	Liberal
1864	John Yorke	Conservative	James Martin	Liberal
1865	John Yorke	Conservative	William Edward Dowdeswell	Conservative
1866	John Yorke	Conservative	Sir Edmund Lechmere, Bt	Conservative
1868	Representation reduced to one Member			

=== MPs 1868–1918 ===
Election	Member	Party
1868	William Edwin Price	Liberal
1880	Richard Martin	Liberal
1885	John Yorke	Conservative
1886	Sir John Dorington	Conservative
1906	Hon. Michael Hicks Beach	Conservative
1916	William Frederick Hicks-Beach	Unionist
1918	Constituency abolished	

=== MPs since 1997 ===
Election	Member	Party	Notes
1997	Laurence Robertson	Conservative	
2024	Cameron Thomas	Liberal Democrats	
2026	Cameron Thomas	Independent	Whip suspended pending police investigation

== Elections since 1997 ==
Results over time

=== Elections in the 2020s ===
General election 2024: Tewkesbury
Party	Candidate	Votes	%	±%
Liberal Democrats	Cameron Thomas	20,730	42.7	+20.7
Conservative	Laurence Robertson	14,468	29.8	–28.3
Reform	Byron Davis	6,000	12.4	N/A
Labour	Damola Animashaun	4,298	8.9	–6.8
Green	Cate Cody	2,873	5.9	+1.7
CPA	David Edgar	170	0.4	N/A
Majority		6,262	12.9	N/A
Turnout		48,539	66.1	–8.3
Registered electors		73,458		
Liberal Democrats gain from Conservative		Swing	+24.5	

=== Elections in the 2010s ===
2019 notional result
Party	Vote	%
Conservative	31,291	58.1
Liberal Democrats	11,848	22.0
Labour	8,448	15.7
Green	2,271	4.2
Turnout	53,858	74.4
Electorate	72,426	

General election 2019: Tewkesbury
Party	Candidate	Votes	%	±%
Conservative	Laurence Robertson	35,728	58.4	–1.6
Liberal Democrats	Alex Hegenbarth	13,318	21.8	+8.3
Labour	Lara Chaplin	9,310	15.2	−6.6
Green	Cate Cody	2,784	4.6	+1.9
Majority		22,410	36.6	−1.6
Turnout		61,140	72.8	+0.3
Registered electors		83,958		+3.1
Conservative hold		Swing	−5.0	

General election 2017: Tewkesbury
Party	Candidate	Votes	%	±%
Conservative	Laurence Robertson	35,448	60.0	+5.5
Labour	Manjinder Singh Kang	12,874	21.8	+7.0
Liberal Democrats	Cait Clucas	7,981	13.5	−0.3
Green	Cate Cody	1,576	2.7	−1.3
UKIP	Simon Collins	1,205	2.0	−10.9
Majority		22,574	38.2	−1.5
Turnout		59,084	72.5	+2.4
Registered electors		81,440		+3.2
Conservative hold		Swing	−0.7	

General election 2015: Tewkesbury
Party	Candidate	Votes	%	±%
Conservative	Laurence Robertson	30,176	54.5	+7.3
Labour	Ed Buxton	8,204	14.8	+3.2
Liberal Democrats	Alistair Cameron	7,629	13.8	−21.7
UKIP	Stuart Adair	7,128	12.9	+8.8
Green	Jemma Clarke	2,207	4.0	+3.0
Majority		21,972	39.7	+28.0
Turnout		55,344	70.1	−0.3
Registered electors		78,910		+2.9
Conservative hold				

General election 2010: Tewkesbury
Party	Candidate	Votes	%	±%
Conservative	Laurence Robertson	25,472	47.2	−1.0
Liberal Democrats	Alistair Cameron	19,162	35.5	+7.1
Labour	Stuart Emmerson	6,253	11.6	−8.7
UKIP	Brian Jones	2,230	4.1	N/A
Green	Matthew Sidford	525	1.0	−2.2
Monster Raving Loony	George Ridgeon	319	0.6	N/A
Majority		6,310	11.7	−8.1
Turnout		53,961	70.4	+8.2
Registered electors		76,655		+3.4
Conservative hold		Swing	−4.0	

=== Elections in the 2000s ===
General election 2005: Tewkesbury
Party	Candidate	Votes	%	±%
Conservative	Laurence Robertson	22,339	49.1	+3.0
Liberal Democrats	Alistair Cameron	12,447	27.4	+1.2
Labour	Charles Mannan	9,179	20.2	−6.7
Green	Robert Rendell	1,488	3.3	N/A
Majority		9,892	21.7	+2.5
Turnout		45,453	63.2	−1.1
Registered electors		71,945		+2.4
Conservative hold		Swing	+1.0	

General election 2001: Tewkesbury
Party	Candidate	Votes	%	±%
Conservative	Laurence Robertson	20,830	46.1	+0.3
Labour	Keir Dhillon	12,167	26.9	+0.7
Liberal Democrats	Steve Martin	11,863	26.2	−1.8
Independent	Charles Vernall	335	0.7	N/A
Majority		8,663	19.2	+1.4
Turnout		45,195	64.3	−12.2
Registered electors		70,276		+3.0
Conservative hold		Swing	+1.1	

=== Election in the 1990s ===
General election 1997: Tewkesbury
Party	Candidate	Votes	%	±%
Conservative	Laurence Robertson	23,859	45.8	−8.1
Liberal Democrats	John Sewell	14,625	28.0	−7.1
Labour	Kelvin Tustin	13,665	26.2	+16.1
Majority		9,234	17.8	−0.8
Turnout		52,147	76.5	−5.5
Registered electors		68,208		+6.3
Conservative win (new seat)				

== Election results 1868–1918 ==
=== Elections in the 1910s ===
1916 Tewkesbury by-election
Party	Candidate	Votes	%	±%
Unionist	William Hicks-Beach	7,127	83.2	+31.2
Independent	William J. Boosey	1,438	16.8	New
Majority		5,689	66.4	+62.4
Turnout		8,565	62.0	−21.4
Registered electors		13,818		
Unionist hold				

Mathias

General election 1914–15:

Another general election was required to take place before the end of 1915. The political parties had been making preparations for an election to take place and by July 1914, the following candidates had been selected;

- Unionist: Michael Hicks Beach
- Liberal: Richard Mathias

General election December 1910: Tewkesbury
Party	Candidate	Votes	%	±%
Conservative	Michael Hicks Beach	5,699	52.0	−1.2
Liberal	Robert Ashton Lister	5,267	48.0	+3.3
Majority		432	4.0	−4.5
Turnout		10,966	83.4	−3.1
Registered electors		13,155		0.0
Conservative hold		Swing	−2.3	

General election January 1910: Tewkesbury
Party	Candidate	Votes	%	±%
Conservative	Michael Hicks Beach	6,050	53.2	+2.6
Liberal	Robert Ashton Lister	5,088	44.7	−4.7
Labour	Charles Fox	238	2.1	New
Majority		962	8.5	+7.3
Turnout		962	86.5	+7.0
Registered electors		13,155		−0.5
Conservative hold		Swing	+3.6	

=== Elections in the 1900s ===
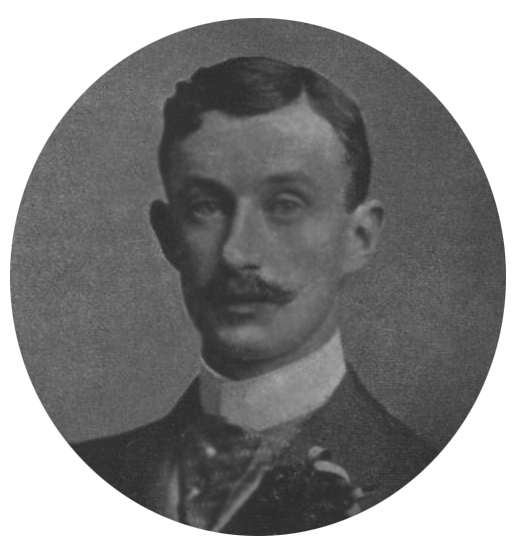
Hicks Beach

General election 1906: Tewkesbury
Party	Candidate	Votes	%	±%
Conservative	Michael Hicks Beach	5,321	50.6	N/A
Liberal	Robert Ashton Lister	5,194	49.4	New
Majority		127	1.2	N/A
Turnout		10,515	79.5	N/A
Registered electors		13,226		N/A
Conservative hold		Swing	N/A	

General election 1900: Tewkesbury
Party	Candidate	Votes	%	±%
Conservative	John Dorington	Unopposed		
Conservative hold				

=== Elections in the 1890s ===
General election 1895: Tewkesbury
Party	Candidate	Votes	%	±%
Conservative	John Dorington	Unopposed		
Conservative hold				

General election 1892: Tewkesbury
Party	Candidate	Votes	%	±%
Conservative	John Dorington	5,028	54.9	N/A
Liberal	Godfrey Samuelson	4,125	45.1	New
Majority		903	9.8	N/A
Turnout		9,153	79.5	N/A
Registered electors		11,519		N/A
Conservative hold				

=== Elections in the 1880s ===
Dorington

General election 1886: Tewkesbury
Party	Candidate	Votes	%	±%
Conservative	John Dorington	Unopposed		
Conservative hold				

General election 1885: Tewkesbury
Party	Candidate	Votes	%	±%
Conservative	John Yorke	4,666	51.0	+1.7
Liberal	Godfrey Samuelson	4,484	49.0	−1.7
Majority		182	2.0	N/A
Turnout		9,150	78.4	−15.9
Registered electors		11,665		
Conservative gain from Liberal		Swing	+1.7	

By-election, 12 Jul 1880: Tewkesbury
Party	Candidate	Votes	%	±%
Liberal	Richard Martin	380	56.0	+5.3
Conservative	John Arthur Fowler	298	44.0	−5.3
Majority		82	12.0	+10.7
Turnout		678	92.5	−1.8
Registered electors		733		
Liberal hold		Swing	+5.4	

General election 1880: Tewkesbury
Party	Candidate	Votes	%	±%
Liberal	William Edwin Price	350	50.7	−1.3
Conservative	John Arthur Fowler	341	49.3	+1.3
Majority		9	1.4	−2.6
Turnout		691	94.3	+2.1
Registered electors		733		
Liberal hold		Swing	−1.4	

=== Election in the 1870s ===
General election 1874: Tewkesbury
Party	Candidate	Votes	%	±%
Liberal	William Edwin Price	350	52.0	−4.0
Conservative	Edmund Lechmere	323	48.0	+4.0
Majority		27	4.0	−8.0
Turnout		673	92.2	+7.1
Registered electors		730		−2.0
Liberal hold		Swing	−4.0	

=== Elections in the 1860s ===
General election 1868: Tewkesbury
Party	Candidate	Votes	%	±%
Liberal	William Edwin Price	355	56.0	+27.5
Conservative	Edmund Lechmere	279	44.0	−27.5
Majority		76	12.0	N/A
Turnout		634	85.1	+4.0
Registered electors		745		
Liberal gain from Conservative		Swing	+27.5	

- Seat reduced to one member.

== Election results 1832–1868 ==
=== Elections in the 1860s ===
By-election, 20 March 1866: Tewkesbury
Party	Candidate	Votes	%	±%
Conservative	Edmund Lechmere	151	50.7	−20.8
Liberal	James Martin	147	49.3	+20.8
Majority		4	1.4	−4.6
Turnout		298	91.7	+10.6
Registered electors		325		
Conservative hold		Swing	−20.8	

- Caused by Dowdeswell's resignation to context the 1866 West Worcestershire by-election.

General election 1865: Tewkesbury
Party	Candidate	Votes	%	±%
Conservative	William Edward Dowdeswell	195	37.0	N/A
Conservative	John Yorke	182	34.5	N/A
Liberal	James Martin	150	28.5	N/A
Majority		32	6.0	N/A
Turnout		264 (est)	81.1 (est)	N/A
Registered electors		325		
Conservative hold				
Conservative gain from Liberal				

By-election, 9 February 1864: Tewkesbury
Party	Candidate	Votes	%	±%
Conservative	John Yorke	Unopposed		
Conservative hold				

- Caused by Lygon's resignation to stand at the 1864 West Worcestershire by-election.

=== Elections in the 1850s ===
General election 1859: Tewkesbury
Party	Candidate	Votes	%	±%
Conservative	Frederick Lygon	Unopposed		
Liberal	James Martin	Unopposed		
Registered electors		341		
Conservative hold				
Liberal hold				

By-election, 8 March 1859: Tewkesbury
Party	Candidate	Votes	%	±%
Conservative	Frederick Lygon	171	100.0	+56.8
Whig	Humphrey Brown	0	0.0	−56.8
Majority		171	100.0	+94.0
Turnout		171	50.1	−20.1
Registered electors		341		
Conservative hold		Swing	+56.8	

- Caused by the appointment of Lygon as a Civil Lord of the Admiralty

General election 1857: Tewkesbury
Party	Candidate	Votes	%	±%
Conservative	Frederick Lygon	200	38.4	+24.8
Whig	John Martin	169	32.4	−2.5
Whig	Humphrey Brown	127	24.4	−13.5
Conservative	Edward William Cox	25	4.8	−8.8
Turnout		261 (est)	70.2 (est)	−3.0
Registered electors		371		
Majority		73	14.0	N/A
Conservative gain from Whig		Swing	+16.4	
Majority		42	8.0	+0.2
Whig hold		Swing	−5.3	

General election 1852: Tewkesbury
Party	Candidate	Votes	%	±%
Whig	Humphrey Brown	205	37.9	−12.1
Whig	John Martin	189	34.9	−15.1
Conservative	Edward William Cox	147	27.2	+27.2
Majority		42	7.8	−42.2
Turnout		271 (est)	73.2 (est)	+62.7
Registered electors		370		
Whig hold		Swing	−12.9	
Whig hold		Swing	−14.4	

=== Elections in the 1840s ===
General election 1847: Tewkesbury
Party	Candidate	Votes	%	±%
Whig	Humphrey Brown	43	50.0	N/A
Whig	John Martin	43	50.0	+16.4
Conservative	Henry Lascelles	0	0.0	−34.3
Majority		43	50.0	N/A
Turnout		43 (est)	10.5 (est)	−63.5
Registered electors		409		
Whig hold		Swing	N/A	
Whig gain from Conservative		Swing	+16.8	

General election 1841: Tewkesbury
Party	Candidate	Votes	%	±%
Conservative	William Dowdeswell	193	34.3	−32.6
Whig	John Martin	189	33.6	+0.5
Radical	John Easthope	181	32.1	N/A
Turnout		375	74.0	−17.6
Registered electors		507		
Majority		4	0.7	−4.0
Conservative hold		Swing	−16.6	
Majority		8	1.4	−2.6
Whig hold		Swing	+16.6	

=== Elections in the 1830s ===
General election 1837: Tewkesbury
Party	Candidate	Votes	%	±%
Conservative	William Dowdeswell	219	37.8	+21.0
Whig	John Martin	192	33.1	−33.5
Conservative	Joseph Peel	169	29.1	+12.3
Turnout		370	91.6	−4.1
Registered electors		404		
Majority		27	4.7	+4.7
Conservative hold		Swing	+18.9	
Majority		23	4.0	+3.4
Whig hold		Swing	−33.4	

General election 1835: Tewkesbury
Party	Candidate	Votes	%	±%
Conservative	William Dowdeswell	195	33.6	+2.4
Whig	Charles Hanbury-Tracy	195	33.6	−2.1
Whig	John Martin	192	33.0	−0.1
Turnout		379	95.7	+1.4
Registered electors		396		
Majority		3	0.6	N/A
Conservative gain from Whig		Swing	+2.3	
Majority		3	0.6	−1.3
Whig hold		Swing	−1.7	

General election 1832: Tewkesbury
Party	Candidate	Votes	%	±%
Whig	Charles Hanbury-Tracy	210	35.7	−2.1
Whig	John Martin	195	33.1	+6.1
Tory	William Dowdeswell	184	31.2	−4.0
Majority		26	4.5	N/A
Turnout		364	94.3	c. +20.6
Registered electors		386		
Whig hold		Swing	−0.1	
Whig gain from Tory		Swing	+4.1	

By-election, 23 January 1832: Tewkesbury
Party	Candidate	Votes	%
Whig	Charles Hanbury-Tracy	Unopposed	
Registered electors		c. 525	
Whig hold			

- Caused by Martin's death

General election 1831: Tewkesbury
Party	Candidate	Votes	%
Whig	John Martin (1774–1832)	238	37.8
Tory	John Edmund Dowdeswell	222	35.2
Whig	Charles Hanbury-Tracy	170	27.0
Turnout		387	c. 73.7
Registered electors		c. 525	
Majority		16	2.6
Whig hold			
Majority		52	8.2
Tory hold			

General election 1830: Tewkesbury
Party	Candidate	Votes	%
Whig	John Martin (1774–1832)	Unopposed	
Tory	John Edmund Dowdeswell	Unopposed	
Registered electors		c. 525	
Whig hold			
Tory hold			

== See also ==
- Parliamentary constituencies in Gloucestershire

== Sources ==
- Robert Beatson, A Chronological Register of Both Houses of Parliament (London: Longman, Hurst, Res & Orme, 1807)
- D. Brunton & D. H. Pennington, Members of the Long Parliament (London: George Allen & Unwin, 1954)
- Cobbett's Parliamentary history of England, from the Norman Conquest in 1066 to the year 1803 (London: Thomas Hansard, 1808)
- The Constitutional Year Book for 1913 (London: National Union of Conservative and Unionist Associations, 1913)
- F. W. S. Craig, British Parliamentary Election Results 1832–1885 (2nd edition, Aldershot: Parliamentary Research Services, 1989)
- J. Holladay Philbin, Parliamentary Representation 1832 – England and Wales (New Haven: Yale University Press, 1965)
- Henry Stooks Smith, The Parliaments of England from 1715 to 1847 (2nd edition, edited by FWS Craig — Chichester: Parliamentary Reference Publications, 1973)
- Leigh Rayment's Historical List of MPs – Constituencies beginning with "T" (part 1)
