= Joseph Yorke (MP) =

British Member of Parliament

Joseph Yorke (11 January 1807 – 4 February 1889), was a British Member of Parliament.

Yorke was the son of Joseph Yorke and Catherine, daughter of James Cocks and sister of Charles Cocks, 1st Baron Somers. His grandfather the Right Reverend James Yorke was the fifth son of Philip Yorke, 1st Earl of Hardwicke. He was returned to parliament as one of two representatives for Reigate in 1831, a seat he held until the following year. He later served as High Sheriff of Gloucestershire between 1844 and 1845.

Yorke married Frances Antonia, daughter of Reginald Pole-Carew, in 1834. They lived at Forthampton Court in Gloucestershire. Yorke died on 4 February 1889, aged 82. His wife only survived him by three weeks and died on 27 February of the same year. Their son John Yorke was a Conservative politician.

Parliament of the United Kingdom
Preceded by Sir Joseph Sydney Yorke; James Cocks	Member of Parliament for Reigate; 1831–1832; With: Sir Joseph Sydney Yorke 1831; Charles Yorke 1831–1832	Succeeded by Viscount Eastnor (representation reduced to one member 1832)
Honorary titles
Preceded by Robert Stayner Holford	High Sheriff of Gloucestershire; 1844–1845	Succeeded by Edmund Hopkinson
