= William Dowdeswell (politician, born 1804) =

British politician (1804–1870)

William Dowdeswell (18 October 1804 or 10th November 1804 – 5 February 1870 or 6 Feb 1887) was a British Conservative Party politician from Gloucestershire

He was elected at the 1835 general election as one of the two Members of Parliament (MPs) for the borough of Tewkesbury in Gloucestershire, having contested the seat unsuccessfully in 1832. He was re-elected in 1837 and 1841, and held the seat until he stood down at the 1847 general election.

He lived at Pull Court, near Bushley. His son William Edward Dowdeswell was an MP from 1865 to 1876. His father John Dowdeswell was an MP from 1812 to 1832.

Parliament of the United Kingdom
Preceded by John Martin; Charles Hanbury-Tracy	Member of Parliament for Tewkesbury; 1835 – 1847; With: Charles Hanbury-Tracy to 1837; John Martin from 1837	Succeeded by Humphrey Brown; John Martin
