= John Martin (1774–1832) =

Member of Parliament for Tewkesbury
- In office 5 October 1812 – 4 January 1832 Serving with John Dowdeswell
- Preceded by: Charles Hanbury-Tracy
- Succeeded by: John Martin

Personal details
- Born: 1774
- Died: 4 January 1832 (aged 57–58)
- Party: Whig
- Children: John Martin (1805–1880)
- Parent: James Martin (1738–1810)

John Martin (1774 – 4 January 1832) was an English politician. He served as a Member of Parliament (MP).

== See also ==
- List of MPs elected in the 1830 United Kingdom general election
- List of MPs elected in the 1831 United Kingdom general election
- List of MPs elected in the 1826 United Kingdom general election
- List of MPs elected in the 1820 United Kingdom general election
- List of MPs elected in the 1812 United Kingdom general election
- List of MPs elected in the 1818 United Kingdom general election
