= John Walsh, 1st Baron Ormathwaite =

British politician (1798–1881)

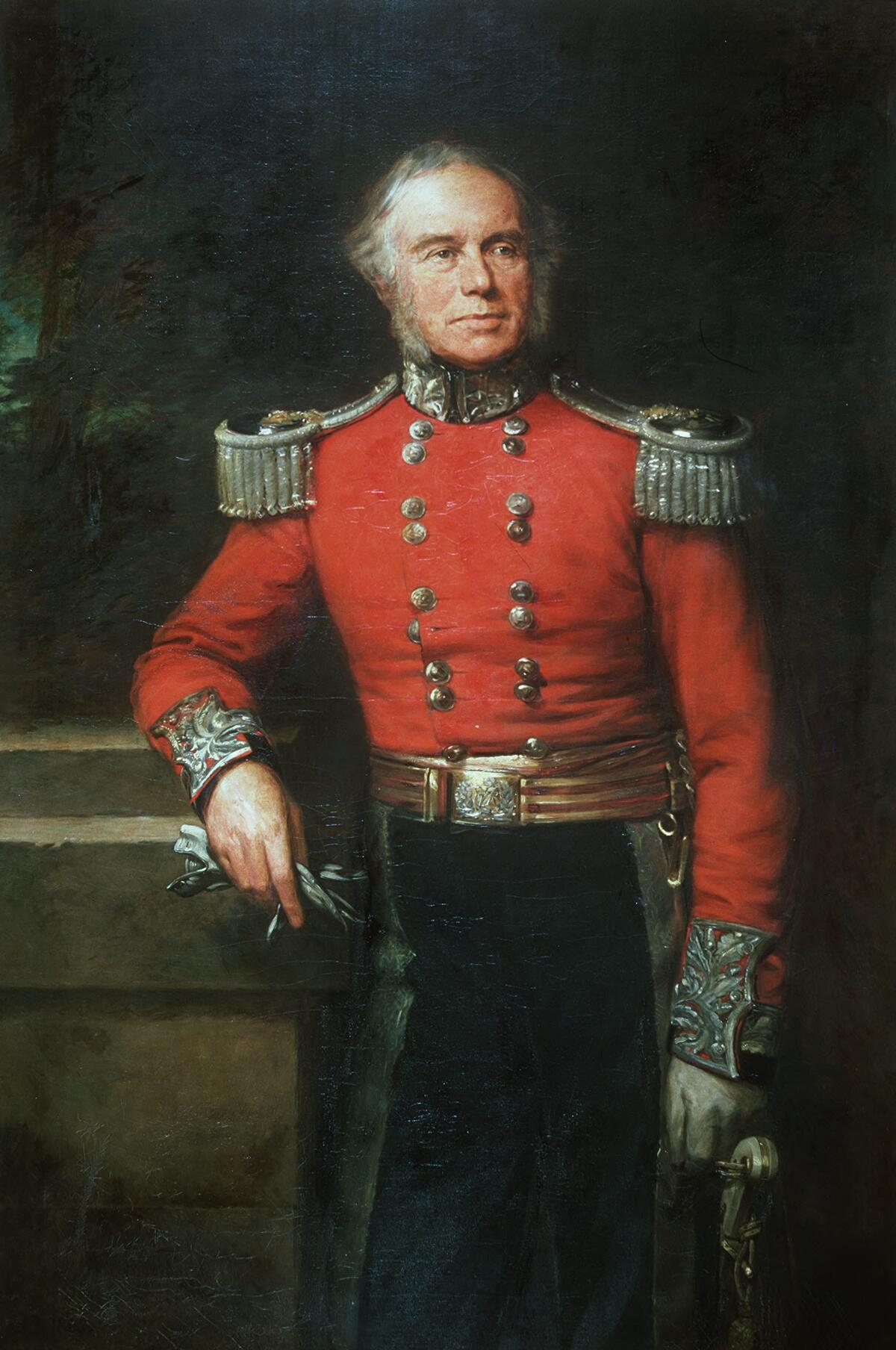
Portrait of John Walsh, 1865

John Benn Walsh, 1st Baron Ormathwaite (9 December 1798 – 3 April 1881), known as Sir John Walsh, Bt, between 1825 and 1868, was a British Tory and Conservative Party politician.

== Early life ==
He was born at Warfield Park, near Bracknell in Berkshire, the only son of Sir John Walsh, 1st Baronet, and Margaret Benn. His mother and father were named Benn but had assumed the surname of Walsh in lieu of his patronymic in 1795, in accordance with the will of his wife's uncle Sir John Walsh (1726–1795), who left him a fortune made in India, including estates in Berkshire and Radnorshire, and also large holdings in Ireland, mainly in Cork and Kerry. Under the terms of the will, the Walsh fortune was to be managed by his parents until he came of age.

He was educated at Eton and Christ Church, Oxford, matriculating in 1816. He inherited the Radnorshire from his mother on attaining his majority in 1819 and also inherited his father's Cumbria estates on his death in 1825. By 1874 his total acreage in Radnorshire had reached 12,500. He also visited his Irish estates regularly over 40 years, and made great efforts to increase the profits. He had the reputation in Ireland of being a harsh and exacting landlord, but his diary shows that he saw himself as a benevolent overseer of his tenants, whom he rewarded for hard work, while ruthlessly evicting those who would not work.

== Political career ==
He served as High Sheriff of Radnorshire for 1823. He then sat as Member of Parliament (MP) for Sudbury between 1830 and 1835 and 1838 and 1840 and for Radnorshire between 1840 and 1868. He also served as Lord Lieutenant and Custos Rotulorum of Radnorshire from 1842 to 1875. In 1868 he was raised to the peerage as Baron Ormathwaite, of Ormathwaite in the County of Cumberland.

He issued numerous pamphlets, amongst which were:

- The Poor Laws in Ireland (1830)
- Observations on the Ministerial Plan of Reform (1831)
- On the Present Balance of Parties in the State (1832)
- Chapters of Contemporary History (1836)
- Political Back-Games (1871)
- Astronomy and Geology Compared (1872)
- Lessons of the French Revolution, 1789-1872 (1873).

== Family ==
Lord Ormathwaite married Jane, daughter of George Grey, 6th Earl of Stamford, in 1825. They had two sons and two daughters. He died at Warfield in April 1881, aged 82, and was succeeded in his titles by his eldest son, Arthur.

== Arms ==
Coat of arms of John Walsh, 1st Baron Ormathwaite
Crest A Griffin's Head erased per fess wavy Argent and Ermine beaked and eared Or Escutcheon Argent a Fess Sable cotised wavy Gules between six Martlets of the second Supporters On either side a Griffin Ermine gorged with a Collar Vair and pendent therefrom an Escutcheon Sable charged with a Martlet Argent Motto Veritas et Virtus Vincunt (Truth and virtue will conquer)

Parliament of the United Kingdom
Preceded by Bethell Walrond; John Norman Macleod	Member of Parliament for Sudbury; 1830–1835; With: Bethell Walrond 1830–1831; Digby Cayley Wrangham 1831–1832; Michael Angelo Taylor 1832–1834; Sir Edward Barnes 1834–1835	Succeeded by John Bagshaw; Benjamin Smith
Preceded by Sir Edward Barnes; Joseph Bailey	Member of Parliament for Sudbury; 1838–1840; With: Joseph Bailey	Succeeded by Joseph Bailey; George Tomline
Preceded by Walter Wilkins	Member of Parliament for Radnorshire; 1840–1868	Succeeded by Hon. Arthur Walsh
Honorary titles
Preceded by The Lord Rodney	Lord Lieutenant of Radnorshire; 1842–1875	Succeeded by The Lord Ormathwaite
Peerage of the United Kingdom
New creation	Baron Ormathwaite; 1868–1881	Succeeded by Arthur Walsh
Baronetage of the United Kingdom
Preceded by John Walsh	Baronet; 1825–1881	Succeeded by Arthur Walsh
