= Nicholas Lechmere Charlton =

British politician

Nicholas Lechmere Charlton (18 December 1733 – 20 March 1807), known as Nicholas Lechmere until 1784, was a British politician, MP for Worcester in 1774.

Lechmere was the son of Edmund Lechmere MP (1710–1805), and his first wife Elizabeth, daughter of Sir Blunden Charlton, 3rd Bt. Edmund Lechmere MP (1747–1798) was Lechmere's younger brother; Sir Anthony Lechmere, 1st Bt. (1766–1849) was his younger half-brother.

He was educated by Mr. Graham at Hackney, and matriculated at Trinity College, Cambridge in 1751.

Previously a Captain in the 3rd Foot Guards, he was appointed Colonel of the Worcestershire Militia when that regiment was re-established on 17 June 1770. He resigned the command in 1794.

Following the death in 1773 of Henry Crabb-Boulton, MP for Worcester, Thomas Bates Rous was elected to take his seat in a by-election. However, Rous was unseated on petition for bribery, and in the resulting by-election in February 1774, Lechmere was elected. He was counted by the government as a supporter. He did not contest the October 1774 general election, at which Rous retook the seat.

He succeeded to the estates of his uncle Sir Francis Charlton, 4th Baronet., and took the additional name Charlton, in 1784.

He resided at Ludford, Shropshire, while for 24 years he was a colonel in the Worcester Militia.

He died on 20 March 1807.

== Family ==
He married Susanna, daughter of Jesson Case of Powick. They had two sons and a daughter:

- Edmund Lechmere Charlton MP (1789–1845)
- Francis Lechmere Charlton (1790–1857)
- Emma Lechmere Charlton (died 1809)

Parliament of Great Britain
Preceded by John Walsh; Thomas Bates Rous	Member of Parliament for Worcester; March–September 1774; With: John Walsh	Succeeded by John Walsh; Thomas Bates Rous
