= Sir John Walsh, 1st Baronet =

English landowner & MP (1759–1825)

Sir John Benn Walsh, 1st Baronet (10 February 1759 – 7 June 1825), was an English landowner and MP.

== Life ==
He was born in Cumberland as John Benn, the only son of William Benn of Moor Row, Whitehaven, Cumberland, and his wife Mary, daughter of Timothy Nicholson. In 1787 he married Margaret, daughter of Joseph Fowke of Kent. In 1795 his wife inherited the India-made fortune of her mother's brother Sir John Walsh on condition that they changed the family name to Walsh, which they duly did, by royal licence, and that it would go her eldest son when he came of age. The legacy included Warfield Park, Berkshire, the Radnorshire manors of Cefnllys and Coed Swydd and a number of farms in eastern Radnorshire.

Benn worked for the East India Company in Benares, India, as an assistant and secretary to his brother-in-law, Francis Fowke, making a small fortune in the process, which he invested in land to enlarge the family estates, making his family seat at Warfield.

He served as High Sheriff of Radnorshire in 1798, and sat as an MP for Bletchingley, Surrey, from 1802 to 1804. He was made a baronet in 1804.

He died in 1825 and was succeeded by his son John, the future Lord Ormathwaite. His memorial at Warfield is sculpted by John Bacon.

Parliament of the United Kingdom
Preceded by John Stein; Benjamin Hobhouse	Member of Parliament for Bletchingley; 1802–1806; With: James Milnes 1802–1805; Nicholas Ridley-Colborne 1805–1806	Succeeded by Josias Porcher; William Kenrick
Baronetage of the United Kingdom
New creation	Baronet of Ormathwaite; 1804–1825	Succeeded by John Walsh
