= Baron Ormathwaite =

Extinct barony in the Peerage of the United Kingdom

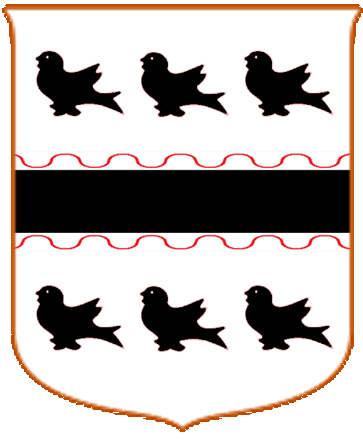
Ormathwaite Shield of Arms

Baron Ormathwaite, of Ormathwaite in the County of Cumberland, was a title in the Peerage of the United Kingdom. It was created on 16 April 1868 for Sir John Walsh, 2nd Baronet, the long-standing former Member of Parliament for Sudbury and Radnorshire. The family descended from William Benn, of Moor Row in Cumberland, the member of an old north-country family. His son John Benn was in the service of the Honourable East India Company and represented Bletchingley in the House of Commons. He married Margaret, daughter of Joseph Fowke, of Bexley, Kent, by his wife Elizabeth, daughter of Joseph Walsh. In 1795 he assumed by Royal licence the surname of Walsh in lieu of Benn, in accordance with the will of his wife's uncle Sir John Walsh (1726-1795). In 1804 he was created a Baronet in the Baronetage of the United Kingdom. He was succeeded by his only son, the aforementioned second Baronet, who was elevated to the peerage in 1868. Apart from his long spell in the House of Commons he also served as Lord-Lieutenant of Radnorshire.

On his death the titles passed to his son, the second Baron. He sat as Member of Parliament for Leominster and Radnorshire and served as Lord-Lieutenant of Radnorshire. He was succeeded by his eldest son, the third Baron. He represented Radnorshire in Parliament as a Conservative and was Lord-Lieutenant of Radnorshire. Lord Ormathwaite also held several positions at the Royal court, notably as Master of the Ceremonies from 1907 to 1920. He was childless and on his death the titles passed to his younger brother, the fourth Baron. He was succeeded by his younger brother, the fifth Baron. He held several minor diplomatic positions. When he died the titles passed to his son, the sixth Baron. The sixth and last Baron Ormathwaite was a farmer and landowner, who owned the Pen-y-Bont Hall Estate, near Oswestry, Shropshire. He never married and on his death in 1984 the baronetcy and barony became extinct. As late as in 1937 the Ormathwaite Estate comprised some 28000 acres of land, primarily in Radnorshire and other parts of the Welsh Borders.

== Walsh Baronets of Ormathwaite, Cumberland (1804) ==
- Sir John Benn Walsh, 1st Baronet (1759–1825)
- Sir John Benn Walsh, 2nd Baronet (1798–1881) (created Baron Ormathwaite in 1868)

== Barons Ormathwaite (1868) ==
- John Walsh, 1st Baron Ormathwaite (1798–1881)
- Arthur Walsh, 2nd Baron Ormathwaite (1827–1920)
- Arthur Henry John Walsh, 3rd Baron Ormathwaite (1859–1937)
- George Harry William Walsh, 4th Baron Ormathwaite (1863–1943)
- Reginald Walsh, 5th Baron Ormathwaite (1868–1944)
- John Arthur Charles Walsh, 6th Baron Ormathwaite (1912–1984)

Baronetage of the United Kingdom
Preceded by Spencer-Smith baronets	Walsh baronets of Ormathwaite; 14 June 1804	Succeeded by Lethbridge baronets
