= James Milnes =

Member of Parliament for Bletchingley
- In office 5 July 1802 – 8 May 1805 Serving with Sir John Walsh
- Succeeded by: Nicholas Ridley-Colborne

Personal details
- Born: 11 October 1755
- Died: 21 April 1805 (aged 49)
- Relations: Richard Slater Milnes (brother-in-law)

James Milnes (11 October 1755 – 21 April 1805) was an English politician. He served as a Member of Parliament (MP).

== See also ==
- List of MPs elected in the 1802 United Kingdom general election
