= Hayley Green Wood =

Nature reserve in Berkshire, England

Coordinates: 51.429°N 0.723°W

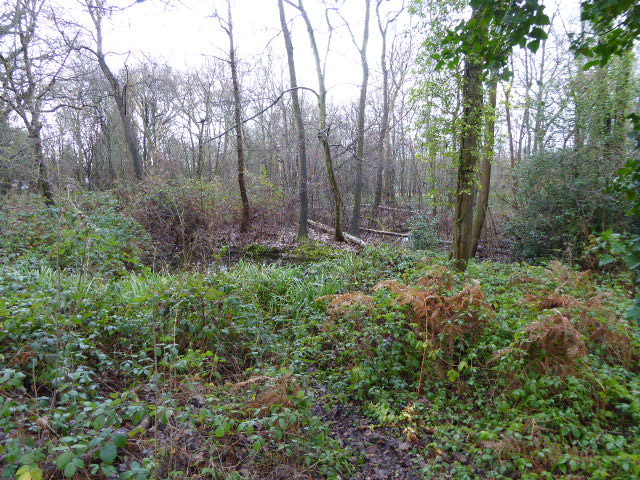
- Interactive map of Hayley Green Wood
- Type: Local Nature Reserve
- Location: Bracknell, Berkshire
- OS grid: SU 889 708
- Area: 2.0 hectares (4.9 acres)
- Manager: Bracknell Forest Borough Council

Hayley Green Wood is a 2-hectare (4.9-acre) Local Nature Reserve on the northern outskirts of Bracknell in Berkshire. It is owned and managed by Bracknell Forest Borough Council.

== Geography and site ==
This site is mainly on London clay and habitats include mixed deciduous woodland with ash, willow and silver birch trees. The reserve also includes a pond.

== History ==
Hayley Green Wood was once a part of Warfield Park, an extensive estate which was owned by Colonel John Walsh in 1766. In 2002 2002 Hayley Green Wood was incorporated into Westmorland Park.

In 2003 the site was declared as a local nature reserve by Bracknell Forest Borough Council.

== Fauna ==
The site has the following fauna:

=== Amphibians and Reptiles ===
- Grass snake

=== Birds ===
- Eurasian bullfinch

== Flora ==
The site has the following flora:

=== Trees ===
- Fraxinus
- Betula pendula

=== Plants ===
- Leucanthemum vulgare
- Prunella vulgaris
- Digitalis
- Hyacinthoides non-scripta
