= Robert Gordon Gilmour =

British army officer

Brigadier-General Sir Robert Gordon Gilmour Bt CB CVO DSO JP DL
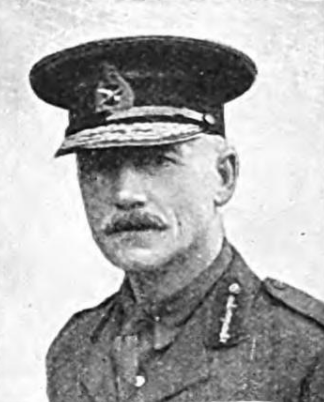
- Born: Robert Wolrige Gordon; 27 February 1857
- Died: 24 June 1939 (aged 82)

Brigadier-General Sir Robert Gordon Gilmour, 1st Baronet, CB, CVO, DSO, JP, DL (27 February 1857 – 24 June 1939), born Robert Wolrige Gordon (he changed his name in 1887), was a British army officer and Captain of the Royal Company of Archers.

== Biography ==
Gilmour was the eldest son of Henry Perkins Wolrige (1831-1906) and his wife, Anne Gordon, 18th of Hallhead and 7th of Esslemont (1827-1874). His father, who added his wife's surname of Gordon by deed poll, was a barrister by profession. He was a younger son of Col. John Wolrige, RM (1780-1849) and descended from a junior branch of the old English Wolryche Family, of Dudmaston. His mother, Anne Gordon, was a Scottish noblewoman and heiress. She was the only daughter of Maj. Robert Gordon, 17th of Hallhead and 5th of Esslemont (1790-1828) and Jane Gilmour (1806-1844). The Gordons of Hallhead are a cadet branch of the Clan Gordon.

Gilmour joined the British Army when he was commissioned a second lieutenant in the Grenadier Guards on 25 January 1878. He served in the Anglo-Zulu War in 1879, was promoted to lieutenant on 1 July 1881, and served in the Sudanese campaign 1884–85. Promotion to captain followed on 23 July 1890, and to major on 25 August 1896. He served in the 2nd Battalion of the regiment in South Africa during the Second Boer War 1900–1902. For his service in the war, he received the Distinguished Service Order (DSO) on 29 November 1900. He was appointed a Companion of the Order of the Bath (CB) in the October 1902 South African honours list, receiving the award from the king at Buckingham Palace on 18 February 1903.

Following his return to the United Kingdom, he was promoted lieutenant-colonel on 28 October 1902, and appointed in command of the 2nd Battalion, Grenadier Guards, taking over from Francis Lloyd.

He served in the First World War, commanding the 98th Infantry Brigade. He served as gentleman Usher of the Green Rod (Order of the Thistle) from 1917 until his death. He was also a justice of the peace and deputy lieutenant. He was later a captain of the Royal Company of Archers, and in the 1926 Birthday Honours created a Baronet, of Liberton and Craigmillar in the County of Midlothian.

From 1897 to 1938, he served as a member of the ruling council of the influential Edinburgh conservationist group the Cockburn Association.

He lived in Inch House a large 17th-century house on the south side of Edinburgh.

== Name change ==
He was born Robert Wolrige Gordon in 1857 and added the surname Gilmour on succeeding to the estates of his great uncle, Walter James Little Gilmour of Craigmillar (1807-1887).

== Family ==
Gilmour married on 19 October 1889, to Lady Susan Lygon (24 May 1870 – 28 January 1962), 2nd daughter of the 6th Earl of Beauchamp. They had four children:

- Sir John Little Gilmour, 2nd Bt. (1899–1977), married The Hon. Victoria Laura Cadogan (1901-1991), daughter of Henry Cadogan, Viscount Chelsea. Their son was the politician Ian Gilmour.
- Mary Gilmour (1890-1978), married the diplomat Sir Hughe Montgomery Knatchbull-Hugessen.
- Margaret Gilmour (b.1892), married Sir William Francis Stratford Dugdale, 1st Baronet (1872-1965). Their eldest son was Sir William Dugdale, 2nd Baronet, former chairman of Aston Villa.
- Grizel Gilmour (1894–1975) who married in 1919 Hon Arthur Oswald James Hope (1897–1958), who became 2nd Baron Rankeillour in 1949.

=== Lady Susan Gilmour ===
Lady Susan Gilmour (24 May 1870 – 28 January 1962) was created a Dame Commander of the Order of the British Empire in 1936 for services in connection with the Queen's Institute of District Nursing in Scotland. She died in 1962, aged 91.

Masonic offices
Preceded by Robert King Stewart	Grand Master of the Grand Lodge of Scotland; 1916–1920	Succeeded by The Earl of Eglinton
Baronetage of the United Kingdom
New creation	Baronet (of Liberton and Craigmillar); 1926–1939	Succeeded by John Little Gilmour
