= Gilmour baronets of Liberton and Craigmillar (1926) =

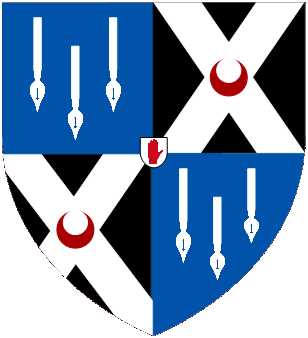
Escutcheon of the Gilmour baronets of Craigmillar, quartering Little

The Gilmour baronetcy, of Liberton and Craigmillar in the County of Midlothian, was created in the Baronetage of the United Kingdom on 29 July 1926 for Robert Gilmour, a Brigadier-General in the British Army and Captain of the Royal Company of Archers. Born Robert Wolrige-Gordon, he assumed the surname of Gilmour on succeeding to the estates of his great-uncle Walter James Little Gilmour (1807–1887).

The 3rd Baronet was a Conservative politician and served as Secretary of State for Defence in 1974. In 1992 he was created a life peer as Baron Gilmour of Craigmillar, of Craigmillar in the District of the City of Edinburgh. He was succeeded in the baronetcy by his son, the 4th Baronet.

== Gilmour baronets, of Liberton and Craigmillar (1926) ==
- Sir Robert Gordon Gilmour, 1st Baronet (1857–1939)
- Sir John Little Gilmour, 2nd Baronet (1899–1977)
- Sir Ian Hedworth John Little Gilmour, 3rd Baronet (1926–2007) (created Baron Gilmour of Craigmillar in 1992)
- Sir David Robert Gilmour, 4th Baronet (born 1952)

The heir apparent is the present holder's only son Alexander Ian Michael Gilmour (born 1980).
