= Worcestershire Militia =

Auxiliary force of the British Army

Worcestershire Militia 3rd & 4th Battalions, Worcestershire Regiment 5th & 6th Battalions, Worcestershire Regiment
- Active: 1558 – 1 April 1953
- Country: Kingdom of England (1558–1707); Kingdom of Great Britain (1707–1800); United Kingdom (1801–1953)
- Branch: Militia
- Role: Infantry
- Size: 2 battalions
- Part of: Worcestershire Regiment
- Garrison/HQ: Worcester
- Engagements: First Siege of Worcester; Second Siege of Worcester; Battle of Worcester; Irish Rebellion of 1798; Second Boer War

The Worcestershire Militia was an auxiliary military force in the English county of Worcestershire. From their formal organisation as trained bands in 1558 until their final service as the Special Reserve, the Militia regiments of the county carried out internal security and home defence duties in all of Britain's major wars, seeing action during the English Civil Wars and the Second Boer War and finally training thousands of reinforcements during World War I. After a shadowy postwar existence they were formally disbanded in 1953.

== Early history ==
The English militia was descended from the Anglo-Saxon Fyrd, the military force raised from the freemen of the shires under command of their sheriff. It continued under the Norman kings, and was reorganised under the Assizes of Arms of 1181 and 1252, and again by King Edward I's Statute of Winchester of 1285.

In 1539 King Henry VIII held a Great Muster of all the counties, recording the number of armed men available in each Hundred. Though incomplete, the surviving Worcestershire lists are very detailed, giving the numbers of men for each ward of the city of Worcester and for each parish and township of the hundreds, together with the wealthier individuals charged with providing 'harness' (armour).

== Worcestershire trained bands ==
The legal basis of the militia was updated by two acts of 1557 covering musters (4 & 5 Ph. & M. c. 3) and the maintenance of horses and armour (4 & 5 Ph. & M. c. 2). The county militia was now under the Lord Lieutenant, assisted by the deputy lieutenants and justices of the peace (JPs). The entry into force of these acts in 1558 is seen as the starting date for the organised county militia in England. Although the militia obligation was universal, it was impractical to train and equip every able-bodied man, so after 1572 the practice was to select a proportion of men for the Trained bands, (TBs) who were mustered for regular training.

In 1586–7, following the outbreak of the Anglo-Spanish War, Queen Elizabeth's government ordered the TBs to be mustered and made ready to march at short notice. Worcestershire mustered 63 Horse and 672 Foot. During the Armada Crisis of 1588 Worcestershire furnished 600 trained foot in four 150-strong bands, together with 100 pioneers (untrained foot), 17 lancers, 83 light horse and 10 'petronels' (the petronel was an early cavalry firearm). The foot joined Lord Hunsdon's army at Tilbury defending the Queen and were formed with the Warwickshire, Leicestershire and Huntingdonshire TBs into Sir Henry Goodere's Regiment, 2,100 strong.

In the 16th century little distinction was made between the militia and the troops levied by the counties for overseas expeditions, and between 1585 and 1601 Nottinghamshire supplied 1151 levies for service in Ireland. However, the counties usually conscripted the unemployed and criminals rather than the Trained Bandsmen – in 1585 the Privy Council had ordered the impressment of able-bodied unemployed men, and the Queen ordered 'none of her trayned-bands to be pressed'. Replacing the weapons issued to the levies from the militia armouries was a heavy cost on the counties. In 1603 Worcestershire was assessed as having 2,500 armed men, 230 pioneers, 21 Demi-lancers and 85 'high horses'.

Most of the conspirators in the Gunpowder Plot of 1605 were Catholic gentlemen from Worcestershire. After the discovery of the plot, their leader Robert Catesby and others withdrew to Holbeche House, where they were surrounded by a 200-strong detachment of Worcestershire TBs under the High Sheriff, Sir Richard Walsh. When they refused to surrender the militia stormed the house, killing Catesby and several other leaders and capturing the rest. Another TB party under Sir Henry Bromley of Holt Castle, acting on information from one of the prisoners, then searched Hindlip Hall and captured two Jesuit priests linked to the plot.

With the passing of the threat of invasion, the TBs declined in the early 17th century. Later, King Charles I attempted to reform them into a national force or 'Perfect Militia' answering to the king rather than local control. The Worcestershire TBs in 1638 consisted of 491 musketeers and 309 'Corslets' (armoured men, signifying pikemen), together with 70 Horse.

In 1639 and 1640 Charles attempted to employ the TBs for the Bishops' Wars in Scotland but many of those sent on this unpopular service were untrained replacements and conscripts. For the Second Bishops' War of 1640, Worcestershire was ordered to march 600 Foot to Newcastle upon Tyne. The raw conscripts were grouped into regional regiments of 1,200 men: Colonel Lord Grandison's Regiment drew upon Worcestershire, Leicestershire and Gloucestershire. Concerned at the prevalence of Roman Catholicism among the gentry, the Worcestershire troops demanded that their officers take Anglican Communion with the men and pledge that the campaign against the Scottish covenanters would not be to the disadvantage of the Protestant faith.

=== Civil war ===
Control of the TBs was one of the major points of dispute between Charles I and Parliament that led to the First English Civil War. When open warfare broke out neither side made much use of the TBs beyond securing the county armouries for their own full-time troops who would serve anywhere in the country, many of whom were former trained bandsmen, or using the TBs as auxiliary units for garrisons. The King commissioned two loyal members of parliament, Sir John Pakington and his brother-in-law Sir Samuel Sandys to raise the Worcestershire Militia for him. However, as the Parliamentary army approached Worcester, the Royalist commander, Prince Rupert decided that the old city walls were indefensible, and evacuated the city. To cover the evacuation, Rupert fought one of the first serious actions of the war on 23 September 1642 at Powick Bridge, south of Worcester. Afterwards, the city was plundered by the Parliamentarian troops. However, the Parliamentary army left on 19 October, marching to the Battle of Edgehill, and the Royalists were able to garrison Worcester and improve the fortifications. The garrison consisted of the Worcester TB regiment of foot under Sir Martin Sandys (elder brother of Sir Samuel), while the King commissioned Sir Thomas Lyttelton (or Littleton), 1st Baronet as colonel of the county's horse and foot (presumably the 'country' units outside the city of Worcester). Sir Samuel commanded volunteer (full-time) regiments of horse and foot based at Worcester, probably including some of the trained bandsmen or at least their weapons.

On 25 April 1643 Sir William Waller's Parliamentary force easily captured Hereford. He then moved on Worcester with 3000 men and eight guns, anticipating an equally feeble resistance. However, the defences had been improved and the 1500-strong garrison, including the regiments of both Sandys brothers, rejected Waller's summons. Waller attacked on the morning of 29 May, beginning with an artillery bombardment at 06.00, and by 10.00 he had cleared the suburbs and outworks but his attacks on the Sidbury and St Martin's gates were repulsed, and the garrison launched a sortie though St Martin's gate. Waller decided not to press this First Siege of Worcester, and left the following morning. Afterwards Sir Samuel Sandys' professional regiments joined the King's field army at Oxford and took part in several of the major engagements of the war.

At the beginning of May 1644 Col 'Tinker' Fox with some of his Parliamentarian troops from Tamworth surprised Bewdley, which was garrisoned by Sir Thomas Lyttelton and about 150 of his TB regiment. Fox marched his prisoners away to Coventry and Lyttelton was sent to the Tower of London. The following month, as the King and Waller manoeuvred through the Midlands, the Royalist army rested at Worcester, re-equipping with shoes and stockings, before moving on. Although Waller marched past the city he did not attempt another attack. Later he was defeated by the King's army at the Battle of Cropredy Bridge.

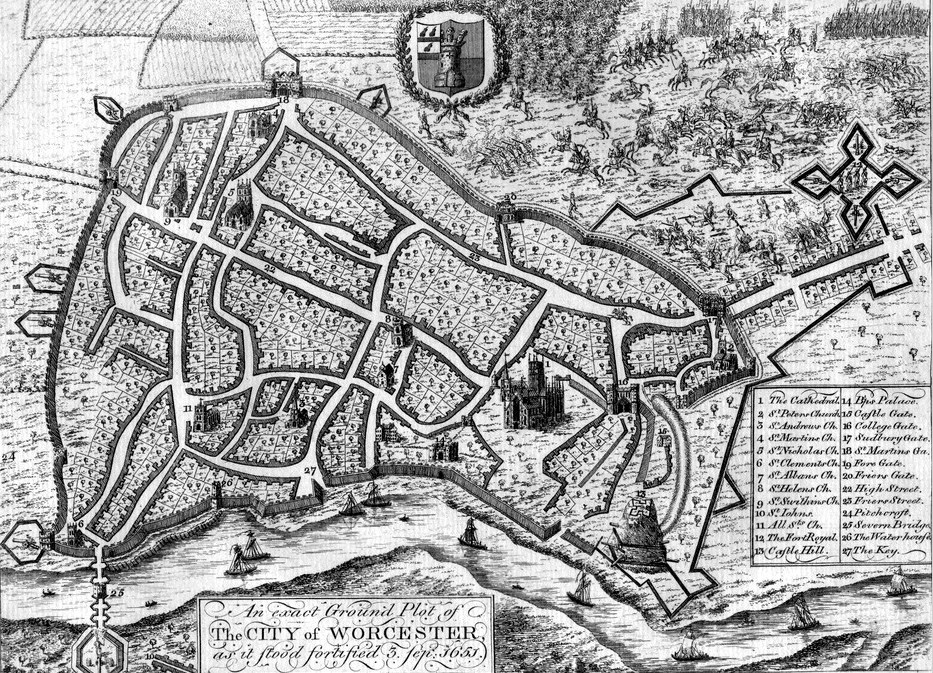
The defences of Worcester in 1651.

By 1646 Worcester was one of the few towns left in Royalist hands. The governor, Col Henry Washington used it as a base for raids on Parliamentary forces. However, the Parliamentarians closed in on 21 May and began a regular siege of the city. The survivors of Sir Samuel Sandys' regiments were among the garrison, in addition to the City TBs. The Second Siege of Worcester ended with the surrender of the city on 23 July after 63 days.

As Parliament tightened its grip on the country it passed new Militia Acts in 1648 and 1650 that replaced lords lieutenant with county commissioners appointed by Parliament or the Council of State. From now on the term 'Trained Band' began to disappear in most counties. Under the Commonwealth and Protectorate the militia received pay when called out, and operated alongside the New Model Army to control the country. Many militia regiments were called out in 1651 during the Scottish invasion and the Worcestershires were ordered to rendezvous at Northampton. They were then diverted to Gloucester as King Charles II's Anglo-Scottish army entered the Severn Valley and established itself at Worcester to rest and recruit. Oliver Cromwell closed in with the Parliamentary army and militia. Major Mercer with the Worcestershire Horse was sent with Col Robert Lilburne's force to secure Bewdley bridge north of Worcester and block the Royalists' line of retreat. Then on 3 September Cromwell's numerically superior force advanced down both banks of the Severn and fought its way through the hedgerows and into the city, destroying the Royalist forces. The Worcestershire regiments of foot, horse and dragoons all fought at the Battle of Worcester alongside the Parliamentary army. Mercer's horse at Bewdley were responsible for rounding up many of the fleeing Royalists. The militia were stood down a week later.

== Restoration militia ==
After the Restoration of the Monarchy the English Militia was re-established in 1662 under the Militia Act 1661. It was once again under the control of the king's lords-lieutenant, the men to be selected by ballot. This was popularly seen as the 'Constitutional Force' to counterbalance a 'Standing Army' tainted by association with the New Model Army that had supported Cromwell's military dictatorship, and almost the whole burden of home defence and internal security was entrusted to the militia under politically reliable local landowners.

In 1667 the Worcestershire Militia was called out to suppress an insurrection among apprentices at Worcester, but the rioters dispersed when the militia arrived. There was a general call-out of the militia regiments of south-west England in 1685 in response to the Monmouth Rebellion, but they were not involved during the Glorious Revolution of 1688. They were embodied again in 1690 when there was an invasion threat from France.

In 1697 the counties were required to submit detailed lists of their militia. The County and City of Worcester under Charles Talbot, 1st Duke of Shrewsbury as Lord Lieutenant, mustered a Foot regiment of seven companies totalling 786 men with Shrewsbury himself as Colonel, and Sir James Rushout, 1st Baronet, MP for Evesham, as his Lieutenant-Colonel, together with two troops of horse, each 60 strong, under Captains Lord Herbert of Chirbury and William Bromley of Holt Castle, MP for Worcester.

The militia were mustered for annual training until the Treaty of Utrecht and the accession of King George I, but after 1715 it passed into virtual abeyance. There were only two further trainings: in 1743 and during the Jacobite Rising of 1745.

== 1757 Reforms ==
Under threat of French invasion during the Seven Years' War a series of Militia Acts from 1757 reorganised the county militia regiments, the men being conscripted by means of parish ballots (paid substitutes were permitted) to serve for three years. In peacetime they assembled for 28 days' annual training. There was a property qualification for officers, who were commissioned by the lord lieutenant. An adjutant and drill sergeants were to be provided to each regiment from the Regular Army, and arms and accoutrements would be supplied when the county had secured 60 per cent of its quota of recruits.

Worcestershire was assessed to raise 560 men in one regiment, but conscription by ballot was deeply unpopular in the Midland country districts and the necessity did not seem so urgent for inland counties like Worcestershire, far from any potential invasion. Although the Lord Lieutenant, George Coventry, 6th Earl of Coventry, and his deputies held a public meeting at the Talbot Inn in Sidbury on 27 July 1758, so few gentlemen were willing to accept commissions that the meeting had to be adjourned until 14 August. The question was then postponed to the following year, and this was repeated for several succeeding years. Most English counties reformed their militia in 1759–60, but the Worcestershire gentry were apathetic, preferring to pay a large fine instead of raising their regiment.

In the event Worcestershire did not reform its militia until 1770, long after the Seven Years' War had ended, when a new Militia Act 1769 quelled some of the opposition. The Earl of Coventry held the lieutenancy meeting at Hooper's Coffee House in Worcester, and this time there were enough gentlemen willing to take part. Coventry commissioned the first officers on 17 June 1770, headed by a former 3rd Foot Guards officer, Nicholas Lechmere (Lechmere Charlton after 1784), as Colonel. Shortly afterwards a Regular Army sergeant-major (from the 27th Foot) and two sergeants (3rd Dragoon Guards and 58th Foot) were appointed to the permanent staff of the regiment; the remainder of the sergeants were militiamen who may have had previous experience. Having raised 60 per cent of the regiment's establishment by ballot, the order to supply arms and accoutrements from the Tower of London was issued on 6 October, and the regiment assembled for its first training at Worcester Town Hall on 29 October. Thereafter the regiment assembled annually for its training. It suffered a serious accident at the 1777 training on Powick Ham, when the cartridge boxes of three soldiers caught fire and five men suffered burns.

=== American war of independence ===
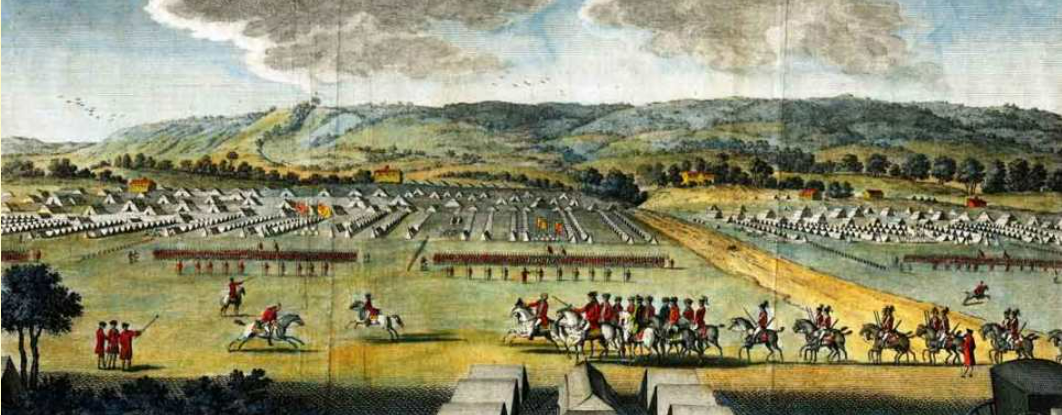
Coxheath Camp in 1778.

The militia was called out after the outbreak of the War of American Independence when the country was threatened with invasion by the Americans' allies, France and Spain. The militia was called out by Royal Warrant dated 26 March 1778 and the reformed Worcestershire Militia was assembled for 'permanent duty' for the first time on 20 April. The regiment was supplied with a complete new set of accoutrements. It became normal policy to gather the militia regiments into encampments during the summer months where they could be exercised in larger formations alongside Regular troops. The Worcestershire began its first march outside the county on 4 June, on its way to Warley Camp in Essex. As was the normal procedure the regiment proceeded in two 'divisions', one of five companies, one of four, taking different routes until they went into billets in various Essex villages on 16 June before moving to Warley Common and camping on 19 June. By 1 July a force of over 8000 men had joined the camp. As well as drill and training, the regiments supplied working parties to clear the furze off the common and to build a road to Tilbury Fort. Each regiment was supplied with two 6-pounder field guns as 'battalion guns', the gun detachments to be trained by the Royal Artillery. Major John Clements of the Worcestershire Militia died while in camp, and the Earl of Coventry appointed John Walsh, the MP for Worcester, to succeed him. This caused great dissatisfaction among the other officers who were passed over, and it was some time before they were persuaded to withdraw their threats of resignation. The camp ended with a review by the King and Queen and a 'sham fight' on 20 October. The Worcestershires left camp on 9 November and went into winter quarters at Hertford, with three companies detached to Ware and Wadesmill, and 2 to Hoddesdon.

In 1778 Parliament had sanctioned the augmentation of the militia regiments by an additional company recruited by voluntary enlistment. The Worcestershires raised their company at Kidderminster and Halesowen in March and April 1779 and trained it as Light Infantry, then coming into favour in the North America campaign. It joined the regiment at Hertford at the end of May. The regiment then left its quarters and marched to spend the summer at Coxheath Camp near Maidstone in Kent, which was the army's largest training camp, while providing a reserve in case of French invasion of South East England. The regiment formed part of the 4th Brigade. On 14 August the regiment left Coxheath to camp at Chatham Lines, with the exception of a detachment that returned to Worcester with the time-expired men and remained there while the next ballot was carried out. The newly balloted men arrived in November, and then the regiment dispersed to quarters in North Kent, with headquarters at Sittingbourne. Smuggling was a major problem along the Kent coast, and the regiment was ordered to send a company to Herne to support revenue officers. In early December the regiment marched to Gillingham, where it was joined by the Herne detachment, and then on 16–18 December left in three divisions for Shrewsbury, Shropshire, arriving on 3–5 January 1780.

The Worcestershire Militia spent the whole of 1780 at Shrewsbury, except during the elections in the autumn, when it was removed from the town and dispersed to smaller towns nearby. The Worcestershire Militia was ordered from Shrewsbury to Bristol on 26 March 1781, and spent some time there, where the principal duty was guarding French prisoners of war. During the year the regiment leased land at Worcester where it established its depot. At the end of the year Lt-Col Dowdeswell resigned his commission because of blindness, and Maj Walsh was promoted in his place. On 22 April 1782 the regiment was ordered to Taunton and Bridgwater in Somerset, then on 21 June to Roborough Down, near Plymouth, Devonshire, where it joined a large encampment. Here the light companies of the various militia regiments were grouped into a composite battalion under the command of Lt-Col the Earl of Cork of the Somerset Militia. On 15 August the Light Battalion moved to Staddon Heights, where it was employed in erecting a coast defence redoubt. In mid-November the camps round Plymouth were broken up and the Worcestershire Militia marched to Dorset, where it was scattered in winter quarters among the towns and villages around Dorchester and Wareham.

The Peace of Paris having been negotiated, the militia were sent to their home counties for disembodiment. The Worcestershires left Dorchester on 28 February 1783 and marched into Worcester on 13 March. The men were dismissed to their homes by 22 March, the volunteer company was disbanded and the original nine companies were disembodied.

From 1784 to 1792 the militia was kept up to strength by the ballot and was supposed to assemble for 28 days' training annually, even though to save money only two-thirds of the men were actually called out each year. In 1786 the number of permanent non-commissioned officers (NCOs) was also reduced. Lieutenant-Col Walsh resigned in 1787 and was succeeded by James Wakeman Newport of Hanley Court, formerly a lieutenant in the 6th Dragoons, but who had begun his military career as an ensign in the Worcestershire Militia 1779–80.

=== French revolutionary war ===
The militia had already been called out before Revolutionary France declared war on Britain on 1 February 1793. The royal warrant went out for the Worcestershires on 2 January and the regiment assembled for permanent duty on 21 January. Only one in six of the men were 'principals' (balloted men), the rest being substitutes, who generally made better soldiers (by 1795 the shortage of substitutes was such that the Worcestershires were offering 15 guineas (£15.75) bounty to volunteers, the most that even regular regiments were allowed to offer).

The French Revolutionary Wars saw a new phase for the English militia: they were embodied for a whole generation, and became regiments of full-time professional soldiers (though restricted to service in the British Isles), which the Regular Army increasingly saw as a prime source of recruits. They served in coast defences, manning garrisons, guarding prisoners of war, and for internal security, while their traditional local defence duties were taken over by the Volunteers and mounted Yeomanry.

The regiment moved out to Devonshire on 25 and 26 February 1793, where headquarters and five companies were quartered in Exeter, the others in small detachments in surrounding villages and towns. While in Devonshire the regiment was frequently called upon to assist the civil powers in suppressing riots, and by the end of April the whole regiment was quartered in the disturbed areas around Crediton and Tiverton. On 27 June it marched to Roborough Down, where once again it went into summer camp as part of a militia brigade. Here musketry training was emphasised, and Lt-Col Wakeman Newport commanded the attacking brigade in the usual 'sham fight'. The regiment also sent parties to recapture a large number of French prisoners of war who had broken out of Plymouth. The camp broke up on 15 October and the Worcestershires proceeded to winter quarters at Totnes and surrounding towns. Worcestershire was able to raise a 10th company for the regiment, paid for by voluntary subscriptions. Early in 1794 Col Lechmere-Charlton resigned the command and Lt-Col Newport was promoted to succeed him on 6 May 1794. The Earl of Coventry appointed his younger son, the Hon John Coventry, as lt-col at the same time, but he resigned the following year and was succeeded by Maj Thomas Clutton of Pensax Court.

The regiment left its quarters round Totnes on 8 May 1794 and returned to summer camp on Roborough Down. The camp broke up in November and the regiment was quartered in Falmouth, Redruth and Truro in Cornwall. In March 1795 the company at Redruth went to Penzance to put down disturbances, and the regiment was also used to arrest smugglers. In April 1796 around 3,000 striking Cornish tin miners approached Truro, seized the magistrates and seriously wounded a corporal of the regiment. The part of the regiment quartered at the town, about 300 strong, was at drill under Maj Ambrose St John; he issued ammunition and drew them up to prevent the rioters entering the town. The rioters attempted to seize the men's muskets, and were then driven back across the bridge at the point of the bayonet by the Grenadier Company. The magistrates read the Riot Act and gave the rioters an hour to disperse; St John also ordered the men to load their muskets and the two 6-pounders, which provoked a barrage of stones thrown by the rioters, casing several injuries to the militiamen. At the end of the hour, with the numbers of rioters increasing rather than dispersing, the magistrates ordered the 6-pounders to be fired over their heads and the militiamen to charge with the bayonet. The result was 20–30 wounded, a number of ringleaders arrested, and the crowd dispersed for the night. They assembled again next day, in greater numbers, but faced by the militia's muskets they eventually went home. Detachments of the regiment also forcibly dispersed large mobs of rioters at Helstone, Penzance and Land's End.

The regiment was relieved in April 1796, moving back into Devonshire where it was quartered around Tavistock, moving to the Crewkerne area of Somerset in May, and then to various towns in Kent for the summer. On 10 October the regiment marched to the Sussex coast, with headquarters and four companies at Hastings, three at Rye and two at Winchelsea. Although these were winter quarters, the regiment was placed on invasion alert. In June 1797 headquarters moved to Eastbourne, but in July it moved to Blatchington Barracks, outside Brighton, where it was to stay for a year, with constant patrols along the coastline. In July 1798 the Worcestershire Militia moved to Rye and Winchilsea, and the Flank Companies (Grenadier and Light) joined the composite 2nd Grenadier and 2nd Light Infantry Battalions respectively.

=== Supplementary militia ===
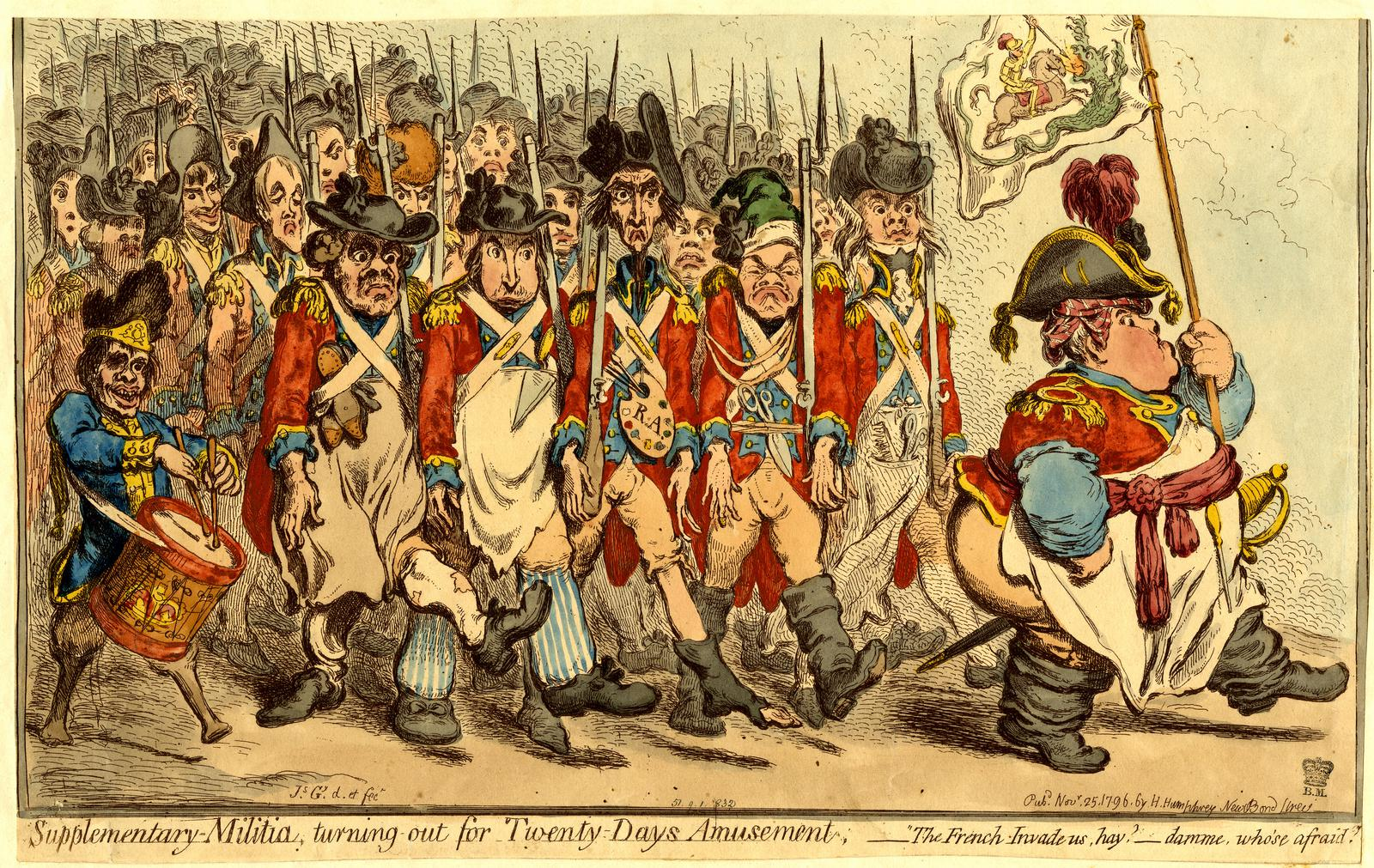
Supplementary-Militia, turning-out for Twenty Days Amusement: 1796 caricature by James Gillray.

In an attempt to have as many men as possible under arms for home defence to release regulars, the Government created the Supplementary Militia in 1796, a compulsory levy of men to be trained in their spare time, and to be incorporated in the Militia in emergency. Worcestershire's additional quota was fixed at 825 men. The lieutenancies were required to carry out 20 days' initial training as soon as possible, and Worcestershire trained its men in four 'divisions' between January and April 1797, assisted by a detachment from the regular militia regiment. A year later the Supplementary Militia was called out; half the Worcestershire men were sent to reinforce the regular militia regiment, the other half formed the 2nd Worcestershire or Supplementary Militia of four companies, which was embodied at Worcester on 15 May 1798 under Ambrose St John, promoted to Lt-Col Commandant. It marched out on 7 June and arrived at Poole in Dorsetshire, where it was accommodated in the barracks throughout the winter of 1798–9.

In July 1799 the Supplementary Militia was reduced, the surplus men being encouraged to volunteer for the regular army: 78 of the 2nd Worcestershires joined the 46th and 62nd Regiments of Foot and the Royal Artillery. Another 42 volunteered for various regiments in October. The regiment left Poole Barracks in July 1799, and after moving round the Portsmouth area it left for Worcester on 13 December. The remaining men were paid off and the regiment disbanded on 26 December. When the Supplementary Militia were re-embodied during the invasion crisis of 1801, 268 men were sent to augment the 1st Worcestershires, but the 2nd Worcestershire was not revived.

=== Ireland ===
In the summer of 1798 the Irish Rebellion became serious, and the French were sending help to the rebels. The 1st Worcestershire was among the militia regiments that volunteered to serve in Ireland and once the necessary legislation (the Militia (No. 4) Act 1798) was passed by parliament it was one of 13 regiments whose offer was accepted. To save time, the men were taken to the embarkation ports in waggons rather than marching. The flank companies rejoined and the regiment with its battalion guns left Winchelsea and Rye on 3 September, embarking on transport ships at Rock Ferry, opposite Liverpool, on 18 September. A detachment of men who refused to serve in Ireland (mainly the men recently drafted from the Supplementaries) was left at Wigan.

The regiment arrived at Dublin on 19–20 September and was billeted in the neighbourhood of St Stephen's Green. Together with the Bedfordshire and East Suffolk Militia the Worcestershires formed a brigade under the command of Major-General William Wemyss. The principal duty was guarding the bridges night and day, with one company of the Worcestershires detached to Kinnegad in County Westmeath. The French force had already been defeated, but to prevent the planned uprising in Westmeath a brigade of Foot Guards was sent to Mullingar in early October, accompanied by the Worcestershires with their battalion guns. The brigade was broken up shortly afterwards, but the Worcestershires remained at Mullingar, where they were joined by their detached company on 23 October. Because battalion guns would slow down any columns sent in pursuit of rebels, they were taken away from the regiments and formed into brigades manned by the Royal Artillery, the Worcestershires' being sent to Dublin. Although the main rebellion was now over, the duty could be dangerous. In October a detachment of the Worcestershires under Capt Ferdinando Smith was sent to protect Clonard. On the night of 28 October a party of rebels armed with rifles, cutlasses and pikes, attacked Mrs Kelso's house at Clonard, killing in their beds the three privates of the regiment posted there for her protection. The rebels were pursued, some being killed and others captured. In September parties of rebels seized Wilson's Hospital School and Port Lemon House, and after they were driven out detachments of the Worcestershires were posted to guard them, with another guard at Baronston House to prevent similar attacks. Later that year Wilson's Hospital was converted into a temporary barracks for five companies of the regiment, which with the Bedfordshire and Londonderry Militia and the Northumberland Fencibles formed Maj-Gen Charles Barnett's brigade. The duty consisted of escorting prisoners, searching for arms, and scouring the neighbourhood for rebels. In June 1799 the regiment returned to Dublin, where it was billeted in houses round Rutland Square and Sackville Street. When the militia were offered bounties to volunteer for the regular army, about 200 of the Worcestershires volunteered, mainly for the 9th, 31st and 56th Foot, of which 85 came from the flank companies.

The forces in Ireland could now be reduced, and the Worcestershires embarked for home on 29 August, landing at Liverpool next day. The regiment was immediately marched back to Worcester and after a parade through the town was quartered around the county. As well as the three men killed at Clonard, 27 men of the regiment had died of disease during its service in Ireland. The Worcestershires were one of four militia regiments granted the Irish Harp as an emblem on their colours for their distinguished service in Ireland in 1798–9.

In October 1799 the regiment moved to Fareham in Hampshire, with detachments at Gosport and Titchfield. The detachment at Wigan had moved to Leigh in April 1799, and escorted French prisoners of war to London in June. It rejoined the regiment at Fareham in November. Another 150 men of the regiment volunteered for the regulars under a new act of Parliament in October, including one complete company of officers and men for the 36th Foot. On 11 December the regiment moved to Portsea, where the remaining 85 men drafted from the Supplementary Militia were sent to Worcester to be disembodied. The regiment was now reduced to eight companies. It moved into barracks in Portsmouth during 1800. The duties at Portsea and Portsmouth included escorting prisoners of war from the camp at Porchester Castle to Reading, Berkshire. From January to May 1801 the regiment garrisoned Fort Monckton on the Gosport side of Portsmouth Harbour, before returning to Portsmouth. A French invasion force was assembling at Boulogne at this time and all militia officers on leave were ordered to rejoin their regiments. The Supplementary Militia was re-embodied and the Worcestershire was augmented by 268 of these men. However, the crisis soon passed and a peace treaty was agreed on 1 October. The militia were sent back to their counties to prepare for disembodiment: the Worcestershires arrived on 23–24 November and were quartered around the county. The Peace of Amiens was signed on 28 March 1802 and the regiment was disembodied at Worcester on 20 April. The establishment of the regiment was set at 53 NCOs and drummers on the permanent staff, and a quota of 616 privates in eight companies, including the flank companies.

=== Napoleonic wars ===
However, the Peace of Amiens was short-lived and the Worcestershire Militia was embodied on 11 March 1803, before Britain declared war on France once more on 18 May The regiment marched on 18 and 19 May for Gosport, where it was quartered in Haslar Barracks as part of the Portsmouth Garrison, later moving to Portsea. The supplementaries were called out once more and assembled at the Guild Hall, Worcester, on 11 July before joining the regiment and restoring it to 10 companies; it was soon increased to 12. As well as drill, musketry practice and 'sham fights', the duties included coastal patrols and escorting prisoners of war to Reading and Norman Cross Prison. In the first half of 1804 the regiment was in Portsmouth with occasional detachments at Portsea, Hilsea, Fort Cumberland and Lyndhurst. From June it was camped on Southsea Common. In November the regiment marched to winter quarters in Devonshire, at Ottery St Mary Barracks (7 companies), Taunton (3) and Honiton (2). A new act of Parliament early in 1805 encouraged volunteering into the regular army and 196 men left the Worcestershires, mainly to the 43rd Light Infantry and Royal Marines; this reduced the regiment to eight companies once more, forcing the surplus officers to retire. As well as the increase in the Regulars, the Volunteers were revived for local defence.

In July 1805 the regiment moved to Lympstone Camp, where it joined Lt-Gen Charles Lennox's militia brigade for the summer while Napoleon's 'Army of England' massed at Boulogne and threatened invasion. On 1 September the regiment was 720 strong under the command of Lt-Col Thomas Clutton. On 15 September the brigade marched to Hemerdon, arriving on 20 September. This march was carried out as if in enemy territory, with the local Volunteers and Yeomanry contesting the way. The camp at Hemerdon was broken up on 21 October and the Worcestershires marched to their winter quarters at Exeter.

In February 1806, while the regiment was at Exeter, Lt-Col Clutton died and Lt-Col St Clair, previously commanding 2nd Worcestershire Militia and now MP for Callington, was brought in to replace him. During the summer detachments of the regiment were moved around Devonshire, before it concentrated in October at Berry Head above Tor Bay, where it was quartered for the winter in hut barracks. Lieutenant-Col St John resigned his commission and the Hon George Coventry, eldest grandson of the Earl of Coventry, was appointed in his place. The regiment remained at Berry Head for the first part of 1807, forming part of a brigade under Brigadier-General James Thewles. In April it moved to Plymouth Dock. Another round of volunteering for the regulars saw the Worcestershires give up another 233 men, mainly to the Royal Fusiliers and the 43rd Light Infantry; at the same time counties that did not keep their militia up to at least three-quarters of establishment strength were fined. The Worcestershires were now offering bounties of £24 10 shillings to men willing to enlist as substitutes for balloted men. In 1809 another 220 men left, more than half to the Royal Fusiliers. In March 1808 the regiment moved from Plymouth to Portsmouth. It remained at Portsea Barracks or Porchester until the middle of 1811, except September–October 1809 when it camped on Southsea Common. In May 1811 the regiment foiled a breakout attempt by French prisoners held at Porchester Castle: six of them managed to scale the wall, but three were caught in the act, the other three recaptured soon afterwards. At the end of June 1811 the regiment marched out of Porchester to Weymouth, Dorset, arriving on 2–3 July, then moving on again on 30–31 July to Wells, Somerton and Ilchester in Somerset. On 26–27 August it moved on to Bristol, which became its base for the winter of 1811. The regiment remained in Bristol until 25–26 March 1812, when it returned to Colwert Barracks at Portsmouth under Lt-Col Coventry (now Viscount Deerhurst since his father had succeeded to the earldom). While at Portsmouth the regiment provided a detachment to serve as marines guarding prisoners of war held on warships in the harbour.

=== Local militia ===
While the Regular Militia were the mainstay of national defence during the Napoleonic Wars, they were supplemented from 1808 by the Local Militia, which were part-time and only to be used within their own districts. These were raised to counter the declining numbers of Volunteers, and if their ranks could not be filled voluntarily the militia ballot was employed. The various units of Worcestershire Volunteers were disbanded and incorporated into five regiments of Local Militia:

- City of Worcester Regiment (redesignated the Worcester Regiment in May 1809) – 700 men in 10 companies under Lt-Col Commandant Ferdinando Smith, formerly captain in the Worcestershire Militia and Lt-Col of the City of Worcester Volunteers, commissioned 24 September 1808
- East Worcester Regiment at Evesham – 600 men in 10 companies under Col Jeffrey Amherst, formerly Lt-Col Cmdt of the East Worcester Volunteers, commissioned 24 September 1808
- North Worcester Regiment at Bromsgrove – 700 men in 10 companies under Lt-Col Cmdt Richard Williams, formerly Lt-Col of the North Worcester Volunteers, commissioned 24 September 1808
- South Worcester Regiment at Upton-upon-Severn – 700 men in 10 companies under Lt-Col Cmdt Hon William Beauchamp Lygon, formerly Lt-Col of the South Worcester Volunteers, commissioned 20 September 1809
- West Worcester Regiment at Worcester – 600 men in 8 companies under Lt-Col Cmdt Thomas, 3rd Lord Foley, commissioned 24 September 1808

Although somewhat insubordinate when first formed, the Worcester Regiment did good service during the Burdett riots at Worcester and Kidderminster in June 1811. In 1813 the permanent staff of the local militia were employed as recruiting parties for their regular militia regiments. The local militia were formally disbanded in 1816.

=== France ===
The Interchange Act 1811 passed in July allowed English militia regiments to serve in Ireland and vice versa. Almost the whole of the Worcestershire Militia volunteered for this duty while it was stationed at Bristol, but in the event the regiment was not sent there. However, another act of Parliament passed in November 1813 invited the militia to volunteer for limited overseas service, primarily for garrison duties in Europe. Four officers and 137 other ranks of the Worcestershire Militia volunteered for this extended service, and joined the 1st Provisional Battalion at Haslar on 13 February 1814. The battalion was commanded by Col the Marquess of Buckingham, whose Royal Buckinghamshire Militia supplied nearly half the strength. After the other two provisional battalions had arrived at Portsmouth the whole brigade under Maj-Gen Sir Henry Bayly embarked on three transports on 14 March. First ordered to the Peninsula, then to Bergen op Zoom, the convoy finally arrived off the Garonne estuary to join the Earl of Dalhousie's division that had occupied Bordeaux. The first boats landing the militia at a village opposite Blaye came under fire from French troops, but in fact the war had already ended with the abdication of Napoleon. Once the brigade had disembarked, the 1st Provisional Bn was quartered at Bordeaux. The brigade did not form part of the Army of Occupation and returned to Portsmouth on 16 June. The 1st Provisional Bn was broken up and the officers and men rejoined their regiments.

After the despatch of this contingent, and the continued drain of officers and men attracted to transfer to the regular regiments, the Worcestershire Militia was reduced to little more than 300 men. Nevertheless, with the war ending, recruitment by 'beat of drum' was suspended. On 9–10 May 1814 the regiment left Portsmouth and marched to Bristol, taking over responsibility for the French and American prisoners of war in Stapleton Prison. The returned men of the 1st Provisional Bn rejoined here. Over the following weeks, detachments escorted parties of these prisoners to Gosport and Exeter prior to their repatriation. With the signing of a peace treaty in Paris, most of the militia were ordered back to their counties to be disembodied. The Worcestershires arrived at Worcester on 2 August and dispersed on 5 August 1814

=== Ireland again ===
After Napoleon's return to France in April 1815 a portion of the militia was ordered out. Although the Battle of Waterloo was fought on 18 June and hostilities ended soon afterwards, a large Army of Occupation remained in France leaving the UK denuded of troops. The Worcestershires were assembled at Bromsgrove for permanent duty on 10 July (not being allowed into Worcester until the Assizes were over). The regiment marched from Worcester on 31 July, arriving at Bristol on 9 August after the completion. of the assizes there. In September the regiment was ordered to Ireland: only 8 men refused to volunteer for this deployment and were attached to the West Middlesex Militia while the Worcestershires were away. Leaving a small depot detachment at Worcester, the regiment embarked at Bristol on 2 October and landed at Waterford, marching to the barracks at Birr, King's County, where it spent the winter. Detachments were sent out for short periods, apparently escorting civilian prisoners. On 2 March 1816 the regiment marched to Roscrea, County Tipperary, and on 8–10 April it shifted to Kilkenny. However, at the end of April it was ordered to return to England, all the militia being disembodied. It embarked at Cork on 24 April and landed at Bristol on 3 May. It marched out on 7–8 May and arrived at Worcester 11–14 May. The regiment was disembodied on 15 May 1816.

=== Long peace ===
After Waterloo there was another long peace. Although officers continued to be commissioned into the militia and ballots were still held until they were suspended by the Militia Act 1829, the regiments were rarely assembled for training: for the Worcestershires, like most other regiments, this was only in 1820, 1821, 1825 and 1831. The ballot was suspended after 1831 and never reinstated. The permanent staff of NCOs and drummers under the adjutant maintained the armoury and stores at St Nicolas Street (rebuilt in 1807 and expanded in 1813), and were available to assist the civil powers, though their numbers were repeatedly reduced. A Reform Act riot began in Worcester on 5 November 1831 and lasted for several days; the magistrates had made preparations for this eventuality, and the Worcestershire Militia staff was on duty at the county and city gaols where the rioters threatened to free the prisoners. However, by 1834 many of the militia staffs around the country were unfit for duty and the following year the regimental staff was reduced to a sergeant major and six sergeants under the adjutant. The lease on the depot in St Nicholas St was given up in 1838 (it was later used by the 2nd Worcestershire Rifle Volunteer Corps) and the staff's weapons were stored at Worcester Gaol.

Colonel Newport (Newport-Charlett from 1821) died in 1838 after 44 years in command and was succeeded by Lt-Col George Coventry, now the 8th Earl of Coventry; Maj Thomas Henry Bund, formerly of the 13th Light Dragoons, was promoted to Lt-Col. The Earl of Coventry died in 1843 and Lt-Col Bund was promoted in his place, Maj Thomas Clutton-Brock, formerly of the 8th Foot and son of the regiment's former Lieutenant-Colonel, became Lt-Col himself in 1848.

== 1852 reforms ==
The Militia of the United Kingdom was revived by the Militia Act 1852, enacted during a renewed period of international tension. As before, units were raised and administered on a county basis, and filled by voluntary enlistment (although conscription by means of the Militia Ballot might be used if the counties failed to meet their quotas). Training was for 56 days on enlistment, then for 21–28 days per year, during which the men received full army pay. Under the Act, Militia units could be embodied by Royal Proclamation for full-time home defence service in three circumstances:

1. 'Whenever a state of war exists between Her Majesty and any foreign power'.
2. 'In all cases of invasion or upon imminent danger thereof'.
3. 'In all cases of rebellion or insurrection'.

Colonel Bund resigned the command of the Worcestershire Militia on grounds of ill-health in July 1852 and Thomas Clutton-Brock was promoted to command the regiment on 3 August 1852 with Maj Thomas Clowes promoted to Lt-Col. Enlistment for the reformed regiment opened on 1 September 1852 and the first 'division' began its training on 12 April 1853 in a field behind the Talbot Inn on the Tything at Worcester, assisted by drill instructors from the 77th Foot. The Worcestershire Lieutenancy bought a house and land in St George's Square and converted it into a depot for the permanent staff and armoury.

=== Crimean War and Indian mutiny ===
War was declared against Russia in March 1854 while the Worcester Militia was undergoing its second training, and Col Clutton-Brock encouraged his men to volunteer for the regulars. After an expeditionary force was sent to the Crimea, the militia were called out for home defence. The Worcestershires were embodied at the regimental depot on 14 December 1854. The men were billeted in the city. On 9 January 1855 a special parade was held at which the regiment was asked to volunteer for service in Britain's Mediterranean garrisons; 450 men immediately volunteered, making it the second regiment to accept the service. However, a legal dispute over the attestation of the men enlisted between 1852 and 1854 meant that they could not be forced to serve beyond 56 days each year. Some 332 men of the Worcestershire refused to re-attest, and together with large numbers transferred to the regulars this meant that the effective strength of the regiment was too low to allow it to serve overseas.

The regiment was progressively brought back to strength by vigorous recruiting. In early September it was moved by train to Stourbridge to allow the Worcestershire Yeomanry to take over the available billets in Worcester for its annual training. The regiment returned to Worcester on 15 September, but was then ordered to Aldershot, proceeding by train on 5 October. Aldershot had become the largest army camp in the country, and the Worcestershire Militia was assigned to 3rd Infantry Brigade in the South Camp huts, under the command of Lt-Col Clowes. As well as training, the regiment took part in a Royal Review on 18 April 1856. The Crimean War ended with the Treaty of Paris signed on 30 March 1856, and the militia were stood down. On 3 June the Worcestershires were ordered back to Worcester, where the regiment was disembodied on 14 July 1856.

Colonel Clutton-Brock died in 1856 and was succeeded on 24 December by Lt-Col Clowes, who held the appointment of Lt-Col Commandant (the rank of Colonel in the Militia having been abolished since the 1852 reforms) but Lt-Col Clowes resigned almost immediately and Maj Thomas Webb was promoted to succeed him. Formerly a captain in the 90th Light Infantry, he was one of the younger officers brought into the regiment in 1852.

Having recently been embodied, the regiment was not called out for training in 1857, but when much of the army was sent to quell the Indian Mutiny the militia were embodied for garrison duty. The Worcestershires assembled at the depot on 12 November 1857, with the men billeted in the city. On 11 December it was ordered to Ireland, and it travelled by train from Shrub Hill Station to Liverpool three days later, leaving No 6 Company as the depot company at Worcester. It embarked at Liverpool Docks, crossed to Dublin, and then went by train to Curragh Camp. No accommodation had been prepared for it, and because the regimental baggage had not yet arrived there were no tents. The officers and men were left all night in December rain, from the effects of which one of the officers died. At the Curragh the regiment formed part of 1st Infantry Brigade under Maj-Gen Horatio Shirley. During the winter nearly 200 men from the Worcestershire militia volunteered for the regulars and a number of young officers received regular commissions. In April 1858 the regiment was ordered home, travelling aboard the transports Trafalgar and Prince to Birkenhead, and arriving at Worcester on 11 May where it was disembodied on 18 May 1858.

From 1859 the regiment began a routine of annual training behind the Talbot Inn, at Pitchcroft Ham (the old training ground of the Trained Bands) or on Flag Meadow by the Lansdown Road, with musketry practice at Hartlebury Common reached by train. The Militia Reserve introduced in 1867 consisted of present and former militiamen who undertook to serve overseas in case of war. Lt-Col Webb resigned his command in 1870 and became the regiment's first Honorary Colonel. Major Thomas Coningsby Norbury Norbury was promoted to be Lt-Col Commandant. He had served in the 6th Dragoon Guards and saw action in the Crimea before retiring as a captain and joining the Worcestershire Militia.

== Cardwell and Childers reforms ==
Under the Localisation of the Forces scheme introduced by the Cardwell Reforms, Regular infantry battalions were linked together and assigned to particular counties, while the county Militia and Rifle Volunteers were affiliated to them in a sub-district with a shared depot. Sub-District No 22 (Counties of Worcester and Hereford) comprised:

- 29th (Worcestershire) Regiment of Foot
- 36th (Herefordshire) Regiment of Foot
- Worcestershire Militia
- Herefordshire Militia
- 1st Administrative Battalion, Worcestershire Rifle Volunteer Corps
- 2nd Administrative Battalion, Worcestershire Rifle Volunteer Corps
- 1st Administrative Battalion, Herefordshire Rifle Volunteer Corps

Militia battalions now came under the War Office (WO) rather than their lords lieutenant. They had a large cadre of permanent staff (about 30) and a number of the officers were former Regulars. Around a third of the recruits and many young officers went on to join the Regular Army.

At this time the Worcestershire was the largest militia regiment in the country, with 12 companies and more than 200 more men enrolled than any other regiment. Together with three other large regiments it was permitted to form a second battalion of 6 companies, which came into existence at Worcester on 13 June 1874. This gave the regiment an establishment of 14 companies (lettered A to N) totalling 1575 all ranks, the additional 200 men required being raised in two weeks. Major Charles Sidney Hawkins, who already held the honorary rank of Lt-Col, became the new battalion's CO, while Lt-Col Norbury remained commandant of the whole regiment. Lieutenant-Col Hawkins had served in the Gloucestershire Hussars Yeomanry before joining the Worcestershire Militia as a captain in 1846.

Following the Cardwell Reforms a mobilisation scheme began to appear in the Army List from December 1875. This assigned Regular and Militia units to places in an order of battle of corps, divisions and brigades for the 'Active Army', even though these formations were entirely theoretical, with no permanent staff or services assigned. The Worcestershire Militia battalions were assigned to 2nd Brigade of 3rd Division, V Corps. This corps was mobilised for combined training in Wiltshire in July 1876. The two Worcestershire battalions went by train to Salisbury, then camped at Yarnton in the Wylye Valley.

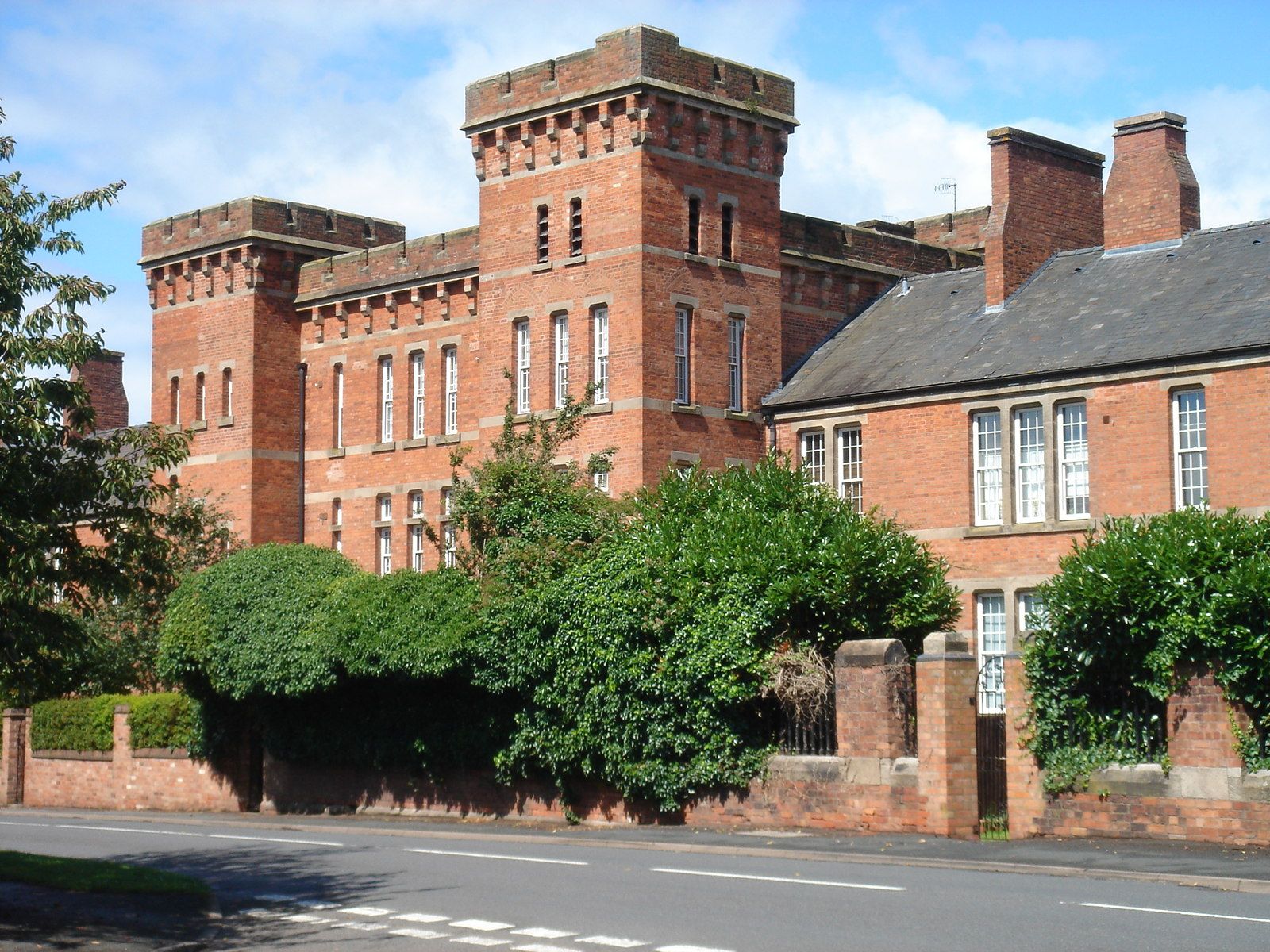
Norton Barracks, built 1874–77 as the regimental depot of the Worcesters.

In 1878 the Worcestershire Militia's headquarters moved from St George's Square to Norton Barracks just outside the city, which had just been completed as the depot for Sub-District No 22. In that year the Militia Reserve was mobilised during the international crisis over the Russo-Turkish War. The Militia Reserve men of the Worcestershire Militia assembled at Worcester on 20 April, and on 29 April 114 were sent to reinforce the 36th (Herefordshire) Regiment at Pembroke Dock. The Congress of Berlin ended the crisis and when it was concluded in July the reserves were stood down.

=== Worcestershire Regiment ===
The 1881 Childers Reforms took Cardwell's scheme a stage further, the linked regular regiments combining into single two-battalion regiments. The 29th and 36th therefore became the Worcestershire Regiment on 1 July 1881. The scheme envisaged each county regiment having two militia battalions: because the Worcestershires already had a double battalion, they became the 3rd Battalion, while the Herefordshire Militia and Volunteers were instead linked with the King's Shropshire Light Infantry. On 8 July 1882 the double battalion was formally separated into the 3rd and 4th Battalions, though they continued to share a single Lt-Col Commandant:

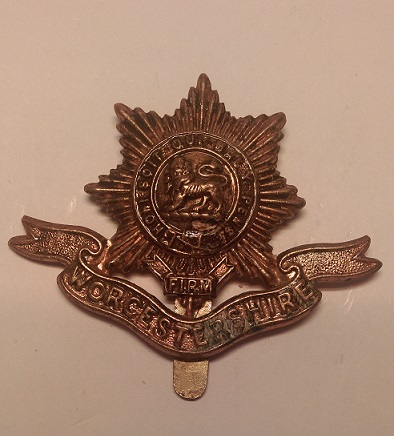
Cap badge of the Worcestershire Regiment.

- 1st Battalion (ex-29th Foot)
- 2nd Battalion (ex-36th Foot)
- 3rd & 4th (Worcestershire Militia) Battalions
- 1st Volunteer Battalion
- 2nd Volunteer Battalion

The militia battalions continued their annual routine of recruit training followed by training by battalions. In 1882, during the Anglo-Egyptian War, the 3rd Bn volunteered to be embodied and to serve overseas. The offer was politely declined, but training for the whole militia was extended from 28 to 56 days that year. In 1883 the 4th Bn was increased to 8 companies, R and S companies being recruited within a few weeks. While troops were absent on the Gordon Relief Expedition part of the Army Reserve (but not the Militia Reserve) was called out, and a few militia regiments embodied, but despite reminding Horse Guards of their previous offer, the Worcestershires were not among them.

In 1898–1900 a number of regiments recruited from British cities were augmented from two to four regular battalions. The Worcestershires, recruiting from the industrial West Midlands, was one of these, and in March 1900 the 3rd and 4th battalions were renumbered as the 5th and 6th (Worcestershire Militia) Bns.

=== Second Boer War ===
With the bulk of the Regular Army (reinforced by the Militia Reserve) serving in South Africa during the Second Boer War, the Militia were called out for home defence. The 5th Bn was embodied from 7 May to 15 October 1900, and the 6th Bn from 8 May to 19 October 1900.

The war still dragging on, the 6th Bn was embodied again on 9 December 1901, and volunteered for active service. With a strength of 15 officers and 535 other ranks (ORs) under the command of Lt-Col Edward Bearcroft it embarked at Southampton on 18 December and disembarked at Cape Town on 18 January 1902. On arrival it was chiefly employed in manning the blockhouse line from Bethulie on the Orange River to Stormberg, and in providing the garrison of Stormberg. It also took part in some of the operations and drives against Boer guerrillas in North Eastern and North Central Cape Colony. After the Peace of Vereeniging ended the war on 31 May, the battalion remained in South Africa until it was concentrated at Burgersdorp and then proceeded to East London for embarkation on 12 September 1902. It was disembodied at Worcester on 10 October 1902, having suffered losses of 20 ORs killed or died of disease. The participants were awarded the Queen's South Africa Medal with clasps for 'Cape Colony' and 'South Africa 1902'. The 6th Battalion was granted the Battle honour South Africa 1902.

== Special Reserve ==
After the Boer War, the future of the militia was called into question. There were moves to reform the Auxiliary Forces (Militia, Yeomanry and Volunteers) to take their place in the six Army Corps proposed by the Secretary of State for War, St John Brodrick. However, little of Brodrick's scheme was carried out. Under the more sweeping Haldane Reforms of 1908, the Militia was replaced by the Special Reserve (SR), a semi-professional force whose role was to provide reinforcement drafts for regular units serving overseas in wartime, rather like the earlier Militia Reserve. The battalions became the 5th (Reserve) Bn on 2 August 1908 and 6th (Extra Reserve) Bn on 23 August 1908 respectively. The 6th Battalion's 'South Africa' battle honour was rescinded in 1910 when the SR battalions assumed the same honours as their parent regiments.

=== World War I ===
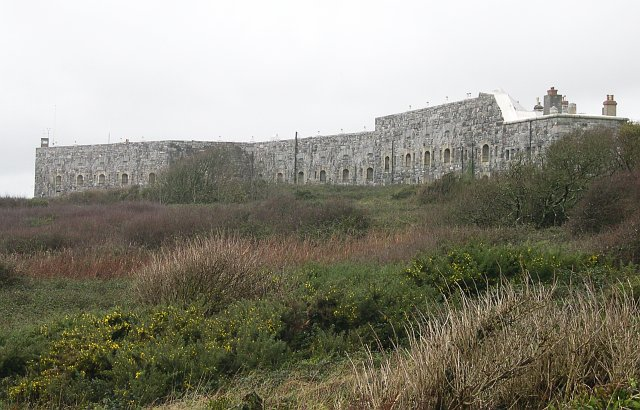
Fort Tregantle, part of the Plymouth defences, base of the 5th (R) Bn, Worcesters in 1914–17.

When World War I broke out the two SR battalions were embodied at Worcester on 4 August 1914 and went to their war station in the Plymouth Garrison, the 5th at Fort Tregantle under the command of Lt-Col W.S. Brindle, and the 6th in Raglan Barracks, Devonport under Lt-Col F.D.W. Lea-Smith (12th Baron Dudley from 1916). Here they carried out their twin roles of coast defence and preparing Army Reservists, Special Reservists, returning wounded and later new recruits as reinforcement drafts for the four Regular battalions serving overseas. Under WO Instruction 106 of 10 November 1915 the 6th Bn was ordered to send a draft of 109 men to the new Machine Gun Training Centre at Grantham where they were to form the basis of a brigade machine-gun company of the new Machine Gun Corps. In addition, 10 men at a time were to undergo training at Grantham as battalion machine gunners. The order stated that "Great care should be taken in the selection of men for training as machine gunners as only well educated and intelligent men are suitable for this work". In the Autumn of 1917 both battalions were transferred to the Harwich Garrison, with 5th Bn at Manningtree and Mistley, and 6th Bn at Dovercourt. During 1918 so many reinforcements were sent to the Western Front that 5th and 6th Bns were temporarily amalgamated under Lt-Col B.R. Roche of the Bedfordshire Regiment, who had taken over command of 6th Bn in September 1916. On 23 February 1918 the combined battalion was moved to Newcastle upon Tyne in the Tyne Garrison.

After the Armistice with Germany, the combined battalion, still under Lt-Col Roche, was sent on 12 April 1919 to do duty in Dublin and was stationed at Portobello Barracks. Here the battalion absorbed the 1st Garrison Bn, Worcestershire Regiment, and reached a strength of 70 officers and nearly 2300 other ranks. The cadre of the battalion returned to Norton Barracks and was demobilised early in July 1919; the remaining personnel in Dublin were taken over by the Regular 2nd Bn when it arrived on 21 July.

=== 12th and 13th (Reserve) Battalions ===
After Lord Kitchener issued his call for volunteers in August 1914, the battalions of the 1st, 2nd and 3rd New Armies ('K1', 'K2' and 'K3' of 'Kitchener's Army') were quickly formed at the regimental depots. The SR battalions also swelled with new recruits and were soon well above their establishment strength. On 8 October 1914 each SR battalion was ordered to use the surplus to form a service battalion of the 4th New Army ('K4'). Accordingly, the 5th and 6th Bns in the Plymouth Garrison formed the 12th and 13th (Service) Bns, Worcestershire Regiment at Millbrook (later at Fowey), and at Looe respectively. They were to be part of 98th Brigade in 33rd Division. The 12th was commanded by Lt-Col Sir Edward Henry St Lawrence Clarke, 4th Baronet, a retired officer of the Worcesters who later commanded a service battalion of the West Yorkshire Regiment, the 13th by Lt-Col Hugh de Berdt Hovell, a Reserve officer of the Worcesters, and then from April 1915 by Col F.M. Reid.

In April 1915 the WO decided to convert the K4 battalions into 2nd Reserve units, providing drafts for the K1–K3 battalions in the same way that the SR was doing for the Regular battalions. The Worcestershire battalions became 12th and 13th (Reserve) Battalion, at Wareham, Dorset, in 10th Reserve Brigade, where they trained drafts for the 9th, 10th and 11th (Service) Bns of the Worcesters. In October 1915 the 13th was at Blandford Camp, in July 1916 the 12th was at Swanage and the 13th at Wareham. In October 1915 Maj J.G.R. Swanson was promoted to command 12th Bn, and in April 1916 Col Reid of the 13th was succeeded in command by Lt-Col Henry Sandys Ainslie of the Northumberland Fusiliers who had been commanding 18th Bde on the Western Front before he was evacuated sick.

On 1 September 1916 the 2nd Reserve battalions were transferred to the Training Reserve: 12th (R) Bn was absorbed into the other battalions of 10th Reserve Bde, while 13th (R) Bn was redesignated 46th Training Reserve Bn, still in 10th Reserve Bde. The training staff retained their Worcester badges and Lt-Col Ainslie remained in command, but the trainees could be posted to any regiment. The battalion was finally disbanded on 21 January 1918 at Perham Down Camp on Salisbury Plain.

=== Postwar ===
The SR resumed its old title of Militia in 1921 but like most militia units the 5th and 6th Worcesters remained in abeyance after World War I (they did not change their numbers even though the 3rd and 4th Regular battalions were disbanded in 1922 and 1923). By the outbreak of World War II in 1939, no officers remained listed for either battalion. The Militia was formally disbanded in April 1953.

== Commanders ==
=== Colonels ===
The following served as Colonel of the Regiment:

- Charles Talbot, 1st Duke of Shrewsbury, 1697
- Nicholas Lechmere Charlton, 17 June 1770, resigned 1794
- James Wakeman Newport-Charlett, promoted 6 May 1794, died 5 August 1838
- George Coventry, 8th Earl of Coventry, promoted 21 December 1838, died 15 May 1843
- Thomas Henry Bund, promoted 19 June 1843, resigned 1852
- Thomas Clutton-Brock, promoted 3 August 1852, died 23 December 1856

Following the 1852 Militia Act the rank of colonel was abolished in the militia and the lieutenant-colonel became the commanding officer (CO); at the same time, the position of Honorary Colonel was introduced.

=== Lieutenant-Colonels ===
Lieutenant-Colonels of the regiment (commanding officers after 1852) included the following:

- Sir James Rushout, 1st Baronet, MP (1697)
- Robert Fettiplace, 6 October 1770, resigned 1775
- Thomas Dowdeswell (former captain, 1st Foot Guards) 9 October 1775, resigned 25 December 1781
- John Walsh, MP, promoted from major 26 December 1781, resigned 1787
- James Wakeman Newport, 3 August 1787, promoted to colonel 1794
- Hon John Coventry, younger son of the 6th Earl of Coventry, 6 May 1794, resigned 20 December 1795
- Thomas Clutton, promoted 20 December 1795, died 20 February 1806
- Ambrose St John, MP, former Lt-Col Commandant 2nd Worcestershire Militia, 14 March 1806, resigned 1806
- Viscount Deerhurst (later 7th Earl of Coventry), 10 November 1806, promoted to colonel 1838
- Thomas Henry Bund (former captain, 13th Light Dragoons), promoted from major 21 December 1838, promoted to colonel 1843
- Josiah Patrick (former cornet, 18th Light Dragoons), promoted from major 19 June 1843, died 1844
- John Cox (former captain, 77th Foot), promoted from major 17 April 1844, died 1847
- Thomas Clutton-Brock, promoted from major 10 March 1848, promoted to colonel 1852
- Thomas Clowes (former captain, 8th Foot), promoted from major 14 August 1852; lieutenant-colonel commandant 24 December 1856, resigned 3 February 1857
- Thomas Webb (former captain, 90th Light Infantry), promoted from major 3 February 1857, resigned 15 March 1870, appointed first honorary colonel
- Thomas Coningsby Norbury Norbury (former captain, 6th Dragoon Guards), promoted lt-col commandant from major 15 March 1870
- Charles Sidney Hawkins (2nd Bn), promoted 13 June 1874, resigned 1877
- Martindale Edwin Vale (2nd Bn), promoted 10 November 1877, resigned 7 July 1883
- Richard Prescott-Decie (former captain, Royal Engineers) (4th Bn) promoted 7 July 1883, lt-col commandant 19 April 1890
- A.Winsmore Hooper (3rd Bn), promoted 30 May 1895, lt-col commandant 2 August 1897
- Edward Hugh Bearcroft (4th Bn), promoted 2 August 1897
- H.E.E. Everard (former lieutenant, Worcestershire Regiment) (6th Bn), promoted 2 August 1905
- S.A. Stephenson-Fetherstonhaugh (5th Bn) promoted 2 September 1905
- Ferdinando Dudley William Lea–Smith, 12th Baron Dudley (6th Bn), promoted 29 March 1911
- Walter S. Brindle (5th Bn), promoted 2 September 1913
- R. Ratliffe (6th Bn), appointed 23 July 1921
- R.D. Temple, DSO, (5th Bn) promoted 10 August 1921

=== Honorary colonels ===
The following served as Honorary Colonel of the regiment (both battalions):

- Thomas Webb, former CO, appointed 15 March 1870, died 1883
- Thomas Coningsby Norbury Norbury, former CO, appointed 18 October 1890
- George Coventry, 9th Earl of Coventry, appointed 17 January 1900, died 13 March 1930

== Heritage and ceremonial ==
=== Uniforms and insignia ===
When the regiment was reformed in 1770 the men wore red uniforms with green facings (the drummers wore reversed colours: green with red facings) and the green regimental colour bore the coat of arms of the Earl of Coventry as Lord Lieutenant. On active service at Warley Camp in 1778 the regiment was recorded as still wearing green facings, but around 1793–4 the facings changed to yellow, and between 1803 and 1808 they changed again, to buff; the drummers wore buff coats with red facings. When the Worcestershire Regiment was formed in 1881, all the battalions adopted the white facings assigned to English county regiments. The Worcestershire Supplementary Militia wore the same uniform as the regular regiment, with yellow facings, but of inferior quality. The Local Militia also wore the same uniform, with buff facings. When the militia was reformed in 1852 the clothing contractors initially supplied inferior red shell jackets instead of coatees, apparently made from recycled cloth known to the men as "devil's dust" because it fell apart so quickly.

The badge of the Worcestershire Militia was a battlemented tower, as on the coat of arms of the city of Worcester. On the officers' Forage caps of 1874–81 the tower was within a garter inscribed Worcester; the other ranks' forage cap badge had the tower on a shield, with three pears (the traditional symbol of Worcestershire) on the first canton, all within the garter inscribed Worcester.

The officers' shoulder-belt plate ca 1810 was a silver oval with the letter "W" in Old English capitals inside a French scroll topped with a crown. For the Local Militia the plate was rectangular; for the East Worcesters the W was inside a crowned garter inscribed LOCAL MILITIA EAST. The buttons worn until 1881 had the old English "W" below a crown.

The gold Irish Harp was embroidered on the regimental colour, commemorating the regiment's service in Ireland in 1798–9. The yellow regimental colour of the Supplementary Militia battalion had a crown and the Royal cypher "G.R." encircled by a wreath with the motto Fide et amore ('By faith and love') underneath, and a scroll inscribed II. Reg. Worcester Militia. The regimental colour of the West Worcester Local Militia had an elaborate painted centrepiece incorporating the arms of Bewdley and Kidderminster, with a scroll underneath reading WEST / WORCESTERSHIRE – LOCAL / MILITIA. A new regimental colour issued to the 1st Worcestershire Militia in 1809 was buff, with the City of Worcester coat of arms in the centre, surrounded by a wreath, with a scroll underneath carrying the regiment's name, and the Irish Harp in the lower right hand corner. The regimental colour presented to the new 2nd Bn in 1876 had the Irish Harp in the centre, with II Batt. on a scroll beneath. The new regimental colour presented the 1st Bn after the formation of the Worcestershire Regiment was white with the Cross of St George overall, the Irish Harp in the centre and the battalion number in the upper left hand corner.

=== Precedence ===
During the War of American Independence the county militias were given an order of precedence determined by ballot each year. For Worcestershire the positions were:

- 29th on 1 June 1778
- 35th on12 May 1779
- 8th on 6 May 1780
- 43rd on 28 April 1781
- 8th on 7 May 1782

The militia order of precedence balloted for in 1793 (Worcestershire was 36th) remained in force throughout the French Revolutionary War. Another ballot for precedence took place in 1803 at the start of the Napoleonic War and remained in force until 1833: Worcestershire was 47th. In 1833 the King drew the lots for individual regiments and the resulting list continued in force with minor amendments until the end of the militia. The regiments raised before the peace of 1763 took the first 47 places, those raised between 1763 and the peace of 1783 took the next 22 places, and the Worcestershires became 67th. Most regiments took little notice of the numeral.

=== Memorials ===
There are two books of remembrance in a display case outside St George's Chapel in Worcester Cathedral with the names of the men of 'other battalions' of the Worcestershire regiment (including the 5th, 6th, 12th, 13th and 1st Garrison) who died during World War I.

The badge of the Worcestershire Regiment is displayed on the roof of the Keep of Tregantle Fort, where 5th Bn served in 1914–17.

== See also ==
- Trained Bands
- Militia (English)
- Militia (Great Britain)
- Militia (United Kingdom)
- Special Reserve
- Worcestershire Regiment
