= William Ward, 3rd Viscount Dudley and Ward =

British peer and politician

William Ward, 3rd Viscount Dudley and Ward (21 January 1750 – 25 April 1823) was a British peer and politician.

Ward was the son of John Ward, 1st Viscount Dudley and Ward, by his second wife Mary Carver. He was elected to the House of Commons for Worcester in 1780, a seat he held until 1788, when he succeeded his half-brother in the viscountcy and entered the House of Lords. In 1780 he married Julia Bosville, younger daughter of Godfrey Bosville of Gunthwaite, Yorkshire, and sister of the ardent Whig Colonel William Bosville (1745–1813). Ward died in April 1823, aged 73, and was succeeded by his son John, who served as Foreign Secretary and was created Earl of Dudley in 1827.

Parliament of Great Britain
Preceded by John Walsh; Thomas Bates Rous	Member of Parliament for Worcester; 1780–1788; With: Thomas Bates Rous 1780–1784; Samuel Smith 1784–1788	Succeeded by Samuel Smith; Edmund Wigley
Peerage of Great Britain
Preceded by John Ward	Viscount Dudley and Ward; 1788–1823	Succeeded by John William Ward
