= Ambrose St John (Callington MP) =

English politician

- Arms of St John: Argent, on a chief gules two mullets or

Personal details
- Born: 1760
- Died: 1822 (aged 61–62) Douglas, Isle of Man
- Spouse: Arabella Hamlyn (d. 1805)
- Children: 7
- Parent: St Andrew St John (father)
- Relatives: John St John (grandfather)
- Education: Christ Church, Oxford
- Military career
- Rank: Major
- Units: Worcestershire Militia; 2nd Worcestershire Militia; 1st Worcestershire Militia

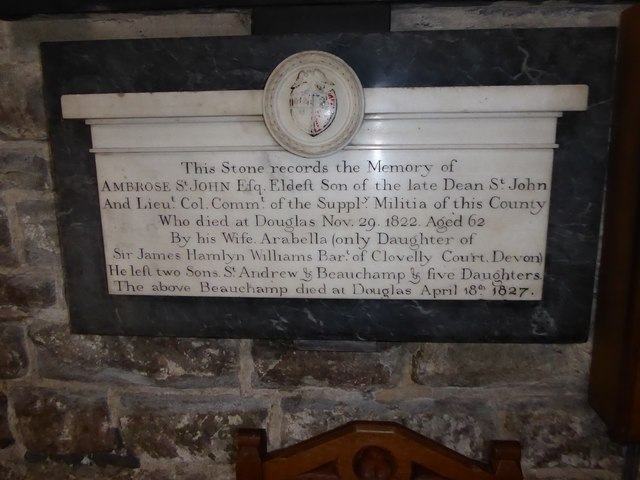
Monument to Ambrose St John in Worcester Cathedral

Ambrose St John (1760–1822) of Prior Park, Berkshire and The Close, Winchester, Hampshire, was a Member of Parliament for Callington in Cornwall and an officer in the Worcestershire Militia.

== Origins ==
He was the eldest son of Very Rev. St Andrew St John (1732–1795), Dean of Worcester Cathedral, the second son of John St John, 11th Baron St John of Bletso.

He was educated at Christ Church, Oxford and the Inner Temple.

He was appointed as a captain in the Worcestershire Militia in 1793 and was promoted to Major two years later. In April 1796 he was commanding a 300-strong detachment of the regiment in Truro when around 3000 striking Cornish tin miners approached the town. Under the direction of the local magistrates, St John and his militiamen confronted the rioters, and when they would not disperse after the Riot Act was read, the militia fired their light field guns over their heads and drove them away at the point of the bayonet, the ringleaders being arrested. In 1798 he was appointed lieutenant-colonel of the Supplementary Militia of the county (the 2nd Worcestershire Militia). That regiment was disbanded the following year, but in 1806 he was appointed lieutenant-colonel of the 1st Worcestershire Militia; he resigned later that year.

== Marriage and children ==
He married Arabella Hamlyn (d. 1805), only daughter of Sir James Hamlyn, 1st Baronet (1735–1811) (born "James Hammet") of Clovelly Court in Devon, and of Edwinsford, Carmarthenshire, Wales, a Member of Parliament for Carmarthen 1793–1802 and Sheriff of Devon 1767–8. Her mother was Arabella Williams (died 1797), daughter and eventual heiress of Thomas Williams (died 1792) of Edwinsford, Llandeilo, and of Court Derllys, both in Carmarthenshire. By Arabella he had issue two sons and five daughters, including:

- St Andrew St John;
- Beauchamp St John (d. 18 April 1827) who died at Douglas, Isle of Man.

== Death ==
He died at Douglas, Isle of Man, on 29 November 1822. His monument survives in Worcester Cathedral.
