= Robert Foley (priest) =

Robert Foley was Dean of Worcester from his installation on 31 January 1778 until his death on 8 January 1783.

The half-brother of the first Baron Foley, he was educated at Trinity College, Cambridge. He was ordained in 1745; and held incumbencies at Newent and Kingham. During his years as Dean he also held the Mastership of St Oswald's Hospital.

Church of England titles
Preceded by William Digby	Dean of Worcester; 1778–1783	Succeeded by St Andrew St John
