= Thomas Bates Rous =

British politician

Thomas Bates Rous (1739–1799) was a director of the East India Company and politician who sat in the House of Commons between 1773 and 1784.

== Early life ==
Rous was the eldest surviving son of Thomas Rous of Piercefield, Monmouthshire, who was a director of the East India Company, and his wife Mary Bates, daughter of Thomas Bates. He joined the naval service of the East India Company. There he acquired a comfortable fortune through the patronage of Lord Clive. He married Amelia Hunter on 25 June 1769. Shortly after his father's death in 1771, he returned to England.

== Political career ==
In 1773, Rous contested Worcester at a by-election on the corporation interest and with the support of Clive. The election is said to have cost him £10,000. He was returned as Member of Parliament on 25 November 1773 but was unseated on petition for bribery on 8 February 1774. He was an East India Company Director from 1773 to 1774. At the general election of 1774 he was successfully returned for Worcester after a contest. He was a director of the East India Company again from 1776 to 1779. At the 1780 general election he was returned for Worcester after another contest. However he was defeated in 1784 possibly due to the depletion of his financial resources in four contested elections.

== Later life and legacy ==
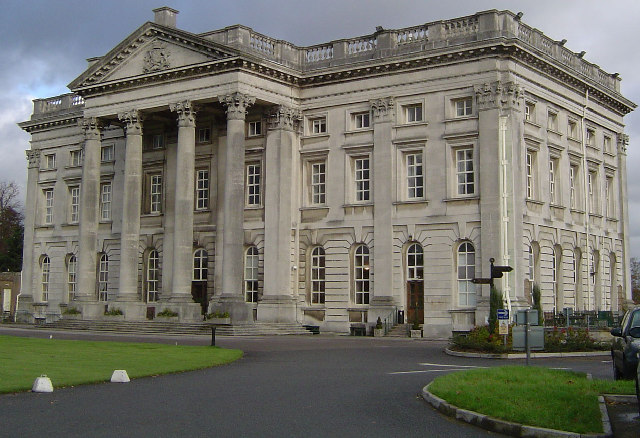
Moor Park mansion

Rouse purchased Moor Park, Hertfordshire in 1785 and in need of cash, demolished part of the building for its valuable stone. He authored a booklet on the Commutation Act in 1786 entitled Observations on the Commutation Project and followed it up in 1788. Pitt had significantly reduced the tax on tea and Rous was concerned that a massive increase in consumption would lead to huge outflow of money from the country. He died on 1 February 1799, leaving his estates to his brother George Rous who sold Moor Park.

Parliament of Great Britain
Preceded by John Walsh; Henry Crabb-Boulton	Member of Parliament for Worcester; 1773–1774; With: John Walsh	Succeeded by John Walsh; Nicholas Lechmere
Preceded by John Walsh; Nicholas Lechmere	Member of Parliament for Worcester; 1774–1784; With: John Walsh 1774-1780; William Ward 1780-1784	Succeeded by William Ward; Samuel Smith
