= St Andrew St John (priest) =

English priest

Dean of Worcester
- In office 1783-1795

Personal details
- Born: 17 January 1732; Bletsoe, England
- Died: 23 March 1795 (aged 63); Worcester, England
- Children: 2+, including Ambrose
- Parent: John St John (father)
- Relatives: John St John (brother); Ambrose Crowley (grandfather)
- Education: New College, Oxford

St Andrew St John (born in Bletsoe on 17 January 1732 – died Worcester on 23 March 1795) was Dean of Worcester from 1783 until his death.

He was the second son of John St John, 11th Baron St John of Bletso. He was educated at New College, Oxford. His eldest son Ambrose St John was MP for Callington from 1803 to 1806.

Church of England titles
Preceded by Robert Foley	Dean of Worcester; 1783–1795	Succeeded by Arthur Onslow
