= Margaret Benn Walsh =

British collector of Indian songs

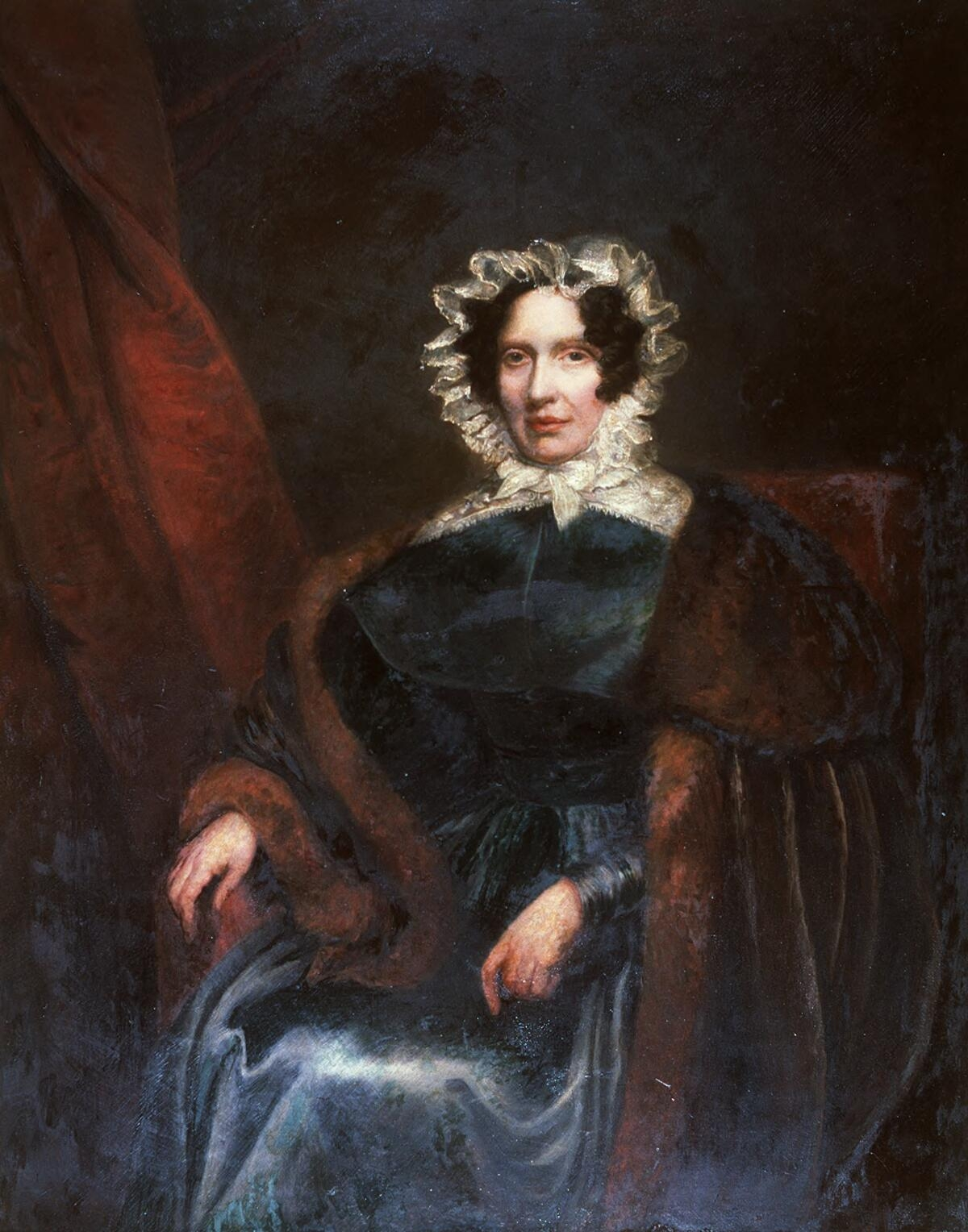
- Margaret, Lady Walsh by Frederick Yeates Hurlstone
- Born: Margaret Fowke; 13 July 1758
- Died: 29 September 1836 (aged 78); Binfield Park
- Education: self taught
- Known for: collecting Indian songs
- Spouse: John Benn later Sir John Walsh, 1st Baronet
- Children: a daughter and Baron Ormathwaite
- Relatives: John Walsh (uncle)

Margaret, Lady Walsh or Margaret Benn born Margaret Fowke (13 July 1758 – 29 September 1836) was a British collector of Indian songs. Her uncle and de facto guardian, John Walsh, left his fortune to her first born son. She lived at Warfield Park until her son Baron Ormathwaite took over the house.

== Life ==
She was born in 1758 and baptised in London. Her mother, Elizabeth, died in 1760, when she was a child and her father, Joseph Fowke, lost interest. He was a successful diamond trader employed by the East India Company. Margaret's godmother was Margaret Maskelyne, Lady Clive. Her mother's uncle, John Walsh, became her de facto parent. Her new guardian's interest at this point appears to have only been financial and he arranged for others to care for her. She had problems with some of these homes and she was reportedly made mentally ill.

Her elder brother went to school, but she was left to educate herself in the libraries of the Clives, the Stracheys and her guardians. She emerged aged seventeen and went to India in January 1776. She had planned to live with her aunt but she died before she arrived. She ended up living in Calcutta and her brother and father came there from Benares. She lived either in Calcutta or Chinsura until 1779. She was described as large, not a beauty, but she was strong willed and she refused to be controlled by her natural father and was said to be interesting to talk to. She was interested in horse riding and mathematics.

She was intrigued by what she called "the Hindostannie air". These were Indian melodies represented for the British ear. She would organise Indian musicians and arrange for the music and words to be written down. She tried to play the music herself she recorded some of the music herself and arranged a concert for Warren Hastings.

There were very few British women in India as generally they could only arrive at their own expense. One estimate places the number at the order of 250. She received two proposals of marriage and she met John Benn.

She returned to England on the Dublin with John Benn and they were married just after they landed in 1787. Her husband had worked as assistant to her brother Francis Fowke where he had been the East India Company's Resident in Benares.

In 1795 her erstwhile guardian John Walsh died and left his estate to her. Although she had married John Benn in 1786 and he had a fortune of £80,000. They changed their names to Walsh to acknowledge the Walsh inheritance. They already had a daughter and when they had a son in 1798 he was named John Walsh. Her husband became an M.P. and a baronet and her son would be Baron Ormathwaite. The Walsh fortune had been left to her with the requirement that the estate should be transferred to her son when he came of age.

Margaret kept a diary and her son also wrote about the pleasure that she and her husband obtained from living and improving Warfield. The house had been built for a bachelor but it was now expanded to cope with a family. Margaret's mathematical and organisation skills combined with her husband's interest and "frugality" made substantial alterations to the property, although Margaret would give all the credit to her husband.

She lived at various less-grand locations after she left Warfield Park to her son's family.

== Death and legacy ==
Walsh died in Binfield Park, a widow, in 1836. The many letters that she wrote to friends in England provide a valuable insight into the life and dress of European women in India. Her portrait by Frederick Yeates Hurlstone is in the National Library of Wales.
