= 98th Brigade (United Kingdom) =

- 33rd Division's formation sign
- Active: 5 November 1914–10 April 1915; 27 April 1915–30 June 1919
- Country: United Kingdom
- Branch: Kitchener's Army
- Type: Infantry
- Size: 2–4 Battalions
- Part of: 33rd Division
- Engagements: Somme: Attacks on High Wood Arras: Second Battle of the Scarpe Third Ypres: Battle of Polygon Wood German spring offensive: Battle of the Lys Hundred Days Offensive: Battle of Épehy Battle of the Canal du Nord Battle of Cambrai Battle of the Selle

Commanders
- Notable commanders: Brig-Gen Robert Gordon-Gilmour; Brig-Gen James Heriot-Maitland

98th Brigade was an infantry formation of the British Army created to command 'Kitchener's Army' units during World War I. It served on the Western Front from 1916, seeing action on the Somme, at Arras and Ypres, during the German spring offensive and the final Allied Hundred Days Offensive.

== Original 98th Brigade ==
Alfred Leete's recruitment poster for Kitchener's Army.

On 6 August 1914, less than 48 hours after Britain's declaration of war, Parliament sanctioned an increase of 500,000 men for the Regular British Army. The newly-appointed Secretary of State for War, Earl Kitchener of Khartoum, issued his famous call to arms: 'Your King and Country Need You', urging the first 100,000 volunteers to come forward. This group of six divisions with supporting arms became known as Kitchener's First New Army, or 'K1'. The K2 and K3 battalions, brigades and divisions followed soon afterwards. So far, the battalions had all been formed at the depots of their parent regiments, but recruits had also been flooding in to the Special Reserve (SR) battalions (the former Militia). These were deployed at their war stations in coastal defence where they were training and equipping reservists to provide reinforcement drafts to the Regular Army fighting overseas. The SR battalions were soon well above their establishment strength and on 8 October 1914 the War Office (WO) ordered each SR battalion to use the surplus to form a service battalion of the 4th New Army ('K4'). In November K4 battalions were organised into 18 brigades numbered from 89 to 106 and formed into the 30th–35th Divisions.

Initially, the K4 units remained in the coast defences alongside their parent SR battalions. On 5 November 1914 four K4 battalions in the Plymouth Garrison were ordered to be formed into 98th Brigade in 33rd Division

- 9th (Service) Battalion, Somerset Light Infantry
- 12th (Service) Battalion, Worcestershire Regiment
- 13th (Service) Battalion, Worcestershire Regiment
- 13th (Service) Battalion, Sherwood Foresters

On 7 December Brigadier-General Joseph Maria Gordon, a former Chief of the General Staff of the Australian Army, was appointed to command the brigade. The units began training for active service, but the lack of uniforms, weapons, equipment and instructors that had been experienced by the K1–K3 units was even greater for those of K4, and by April 1915 their training was still at an elementary stage. On 10 April 1915 the WO decided to convert the K4 battalions into reserve units, to provide drafts for the K1–K3 battalions in the same way that the SR was doing for the Regular battalions. The K4 divisions were broken up and the brigades were renumbered: 98th Brigade became 10th Reserve Brigade.

== New 98th Brigade ==
Meanwhile, the flood of volunteers overwhelmed the ability of the army to absorb and organise them, and by the time the Fifth New Army (K5) was authorised on 10 December 1914, many of the units were being organised under the auspices of local organisations up and down the country. The concept of a 'battalion of pals' serving together originated with the 'Stockbrokers Battalion' of the Royal Fusiliers raised in the City of London and was taken up enthusiastically as 'Pals battalions'. A battalion of the Middlesex Regiment was raised from old boys of various Public Schools on 1 September, followed by another four Public Schools Battalions of the Royal Fusiliers raised at Epsom in Surrey on 11 September 1914 by the Public Schools and University Men's Force of 66 Victoria Street, London.

From 10 December the four Royal Fusilier battalions constituted 118th Brigade of 39th Division under the command of Brigadier-General Robert Gordon-Gilmour, CVO, CB, DSO, retired from the Grenadier Guards, a veteran of the Anglo-Zulu War, the Gordon Relief Expedition and the Second Boer War. However, after the K4 units were converted into reserves, their numbers were reassigned to K5 formations on 27 April 1915. The short-lived 39th Division thus became 32nd Division. At the same time, 118th Bde was transferred to 33rd Division (formerly 40th Division) and renumbered as 98th Brigade.

== Training ==
After initial training at Epsom the brigade concentrated at Clipstone Camp in Nottinghamshire by 26 June 1915. On 1 July the battalions were formally taken over by the WO. All the infantry of the division were concentrated at Clipstone by 13 July and on 3 August they moved to Salisbury Plain for final battle training, with 98th Bde at Tidworth Camp.

Brig-Gen E. P. Strickland was appointed to command the brigade when it went on service, with Major R. H. Hermon-Hodge, Grenadier Guards, as his brigade major. 98th Brigade landed in France to join the British Expeditionary Force (BEF) in November 1915, but 18th and 20th Royal Fusiliers were immediately exchanged with two battalions from 19th Bde, a Regular Army brigade that had been transferred into 33rd Division to exchange experience. In December the reorganised division took over the trenches on the La Bassée front from Givenchy to 'Mad Point', just north of the Hohenzollern Redoubt, scene of bitter fighting the previous autumn, but now considered a 'quiet' sector suitable for newly-arrived formations to learn the routines of trench warfare, including trench raiding and crater fighting. After only a short period the two remaining Public Schools battalions in 98th Bde were transferred to GHQ Troops on 27 February 1916 and disbanded on 24 April, when the majority of their personnel were commissioned as officers. From then until the end of the war the make-up of the brigade was a mixture of Regular, Special Reserve (SR) and Territorial Force (TF) units, with no New Army elements.

== Order of Battle ==
As originally constituted:

- 18th (Service) Battalion, Royal Fusiliers (1st Public Schools)
- 19th (Service) Battalion, Royal Fusiliers (2nd Public Schools)
- 20th (Service) Battalion, Royal Fusiliers (3rd Public Schools)
- 21st (Service) Battalion, Royal Fusiliers (4th Public Schools)

As reorganised:

- 1st Battalion, Middlesex Regiment – from 19th Bde 27 November 1915
- 2nd Battalion, Argyll and Sutherland Highlanders – from 19th Bde 27 November 1915
- 4th (Extra Reserve) Battalion, King's (Liverpool Regiment) (SR) – from 19th Bde 27 February 1916
- 1/4th Battalion, Suffolk Regiment (TF) – from 15th (Scottish) Division 28 February 1916; to 58th (2/1st London) Division 15 February 1918
- 98th Brigade Machine Gun Company, Machine Gun Corps (MGC) – joined 28 April 1916; joined No 33 Machine Gun Battalion, MGC 9–19 February 1918
- A/98 Trench Mortar Battery (TMB) – formed by 27 January 1916; became 98/1 TMB 23 March 1916; amalgamated by 30 June 1916
- 98/2 TMB – formed by 23 April 1916; amalgamated by 30 June 1916
- 98th TMB – formed by 30 June 1916
- 98th Brigade Depot Battalion – formed before each major attack from a proportion of officers and men of each unit engaged, to replace immediate casualties

== Service ==
=== Somme ===
On 10 July 1916, 33rd Division was sent south from First Army to reinforce Fourth Army fighting on the Somme. After detraining near Amiens the division marched up through Fricourt and Montauban. It was in Corps Reserve during the Battle of Albert (12–13 July) before it was assigned a role in the Battle of Bazentin Ridge on 15 July, when 100th Bde attacked into High Wood. 98th Brigade with a machine gun company was concentrated on the edge of Bazentin le Petit to attack 'Switch Trench'. The troops immediately came under shell and machine gun fire from High Wood, and the attack was a costly failure. 98th Brigade was then drawn into the bitter fighting that continued until 20 July.

After a period of rest, 33rd Division resumed the attacks on High Wood on 18 August. The divisional historian described 4th King's advances towards 'Wood Lane' as 'clever and determined', but although they 'walked right into the barrage' they lost heavily and did not reach Wood Lane. After a number of temporary brigade commanders Brig-Gen J.D. Heriot-Maitland, CMG, of the Rifle Brigade, was appointed from 1 September 1916, and continued in command until the final days of the war. Captain R.M. Watson, DSO, of the Royal Dublin Fusiliers, and (from 1918) Capt F.C.V.D. Caillard, MC, Somerset Light Infantry, served as his brigade-major.

The fighting continued on the Somme into the Autumn. On 28 October 33rd Division captured 'Rainy' and 'Dewdrop' Trenches. 4th King's and 1st Middlesex cleared Dewdrop from either end, 'bombing' the garrison out with Hand grenades. Further attempts to gain ground were foiled by deep mud, and the troops began to suffer badly from Trench foot. The division endured the winter in the Somme sector, trench raiding being carried out once frost had hardened the mud. In March 1917 the division was withdrawn to train for the forthcoming Arras Offensive.

=== Arras ===
33rd Division was engaged in actions against rearguards as the Germans withdrew to the Hindenburg Line in March 1917 in Operation Alberich. It was then put into the line for the Arras Offensive. By the time 33rd Division reached its concentration area the offensive had started well, but enemy resistance was hardening. 98th Brigade was engaged in a large attack (the Second Battle of the Scarpe) on 23 April. A lodgement had been made in the Hindenburg Line and the brigade was ordered to force its way southwards along the trench system, mainly with grenades, and meet up with 100th Bde attacking in the Sensée Valley. The attack went in before dawn and at first all went well, but the lifting morning mist showed that the Sensée Valley was completely dominated by machine gun positions and the advanced companies were in the air'. Both brigades were driven back almost to their starting positions and a company each of 1st Middlesex and 2nd Argylls had been cut off. 98th Brigade made a new attack at 19.00 to capture the high ground above the Sensée. The attack secured positions in the Hindenburg Support Line, which the brigade held against counter-attacks that night, including one attack that got close to brigade headquarters. Next morning they found that the enemy had retreated, and the cut off companies were relieved after a 40-hour fight.

After a period of rest the division went back into the line and on 20 May was ordered to carry out an almost identical operation: 98th Bde bombing its way along the trench line to meet 100th Bde. The attack went in when the Germans were at breakfast. The block in the trench was blown by a mine and the bombers reached their objective in the first line, but were held up in the support line. In a renewed attack in the evening, 98th Bde made better progress along the support line. 98th Brigade went in again a week later to continue the work, again attacking at an unusual time (just after the Germans' lunch) and 4th King's bombed their way down across the Sensée to meet the 19th Bde. All the battalions had suffered heavy casualties during these operations, especially among junior officers.

=== Flanders ===
The BEF's next offensive would be in Flanders, with the main attack at Ypres while forces were gathered on the coast at Nieuport to take advantage of the expected breakthrough. 33rd Division was sent to Nieuport on 31 July, and spent a month there, troubled by aerial bombing at night, shelling with Mustard gas, and regular trench raiding by both sides. By the end of August it was plain that the breakthrough and coastal operation was not going to come off, so the division was switched to Ypres where the offensive (the Third Battle of Ypres) was continuing.

After a period of training, the division took over the unconsolidated front line at 'Carlisle Farm' on the Menin Road on the night of 24/25 September for the Battle of Polygon Wood due on 26 September. After the relief was complete the Germans laid down a heavy barrage down on the line at 05.30 on 25 September and attacked out of the morning mist, followed by a second attack an hour later. Most of 98th Brigade's frontline positions held by 1st Middlesex and 2nd Argylls were driven in and their occupants pushed back to the support line. A counter-attack in the afternoon was caught by machine gun fire, but the two battalions managed to establish a continuous line. This German spoiling attack severely dislocated 33rd Division's planned attack for 26 September. Although the rest of 98th Brigade passed through the exhausted Middlesex and Argyll, its attack was limited to recovering lost ground.

=== Winter 1917–18 ===
In November 1917 the 33rd Division was moved to the north of Ypres to take over the Passchendaele Salient from the Canadians, and spent the winter months taking turns of duty in this, probably the worst area on the Western Front, a sea of mud with no cover, with appalling trackways to traverse to and from the line, and under persistent shellfire, particularly with mustard gas shells.

By early 1918 the BEF was suffering a severe manpower shortage and brigades were reduced to a three-battalion basis, many battalions being disbanded and their surviving personnel drafted to reinforce other units. 1/4th Suffolks left 98th Bde and went to 58th (2/1st London) Division as a pioneer battalion. At the same time the brigade machine gun companies were concentrated into a divisional machine gun battalion.

=== Spring Offensive ===
The Germans launched their Spring Offensive on 21 March, but First Army in the northern part of the Ypres Salient was unaffected. However, on 9 April the Germans launched a new phase of their offensive, the Battle of the Lys, and during the night of 10/11 April the infantry of 33rd Division were sent south by train as reinforcements, organised by brigade groups. German guns scored a direct hit on the train carrying 4th King's, killing 40 men. Early on 12 April 98th Bde moved to Dranouter as reserve for 19th (Western) Division, and was then ordered to occupy the 'Green Line' (rear defences) to be ready to counter-attack. But the situation around Méteren was critical, with the line held only by machine gunners, signallers and cooks, and the brigade was marched across to rejoin the headquarters of 33rd Division. Finally, it was marched south to defend Bailleul, without getting into serious action. The Germans failed to exploit their success next day. On 14 April 4th King's supported 19th Bde, which was holding off repeated attacks, while 1st Middlesex supported 74th Bde of 25th Division, but by the end of the day the line seemed to have been stabilised. 98th Brigade relieved the battered 19th Bde on 15 April.

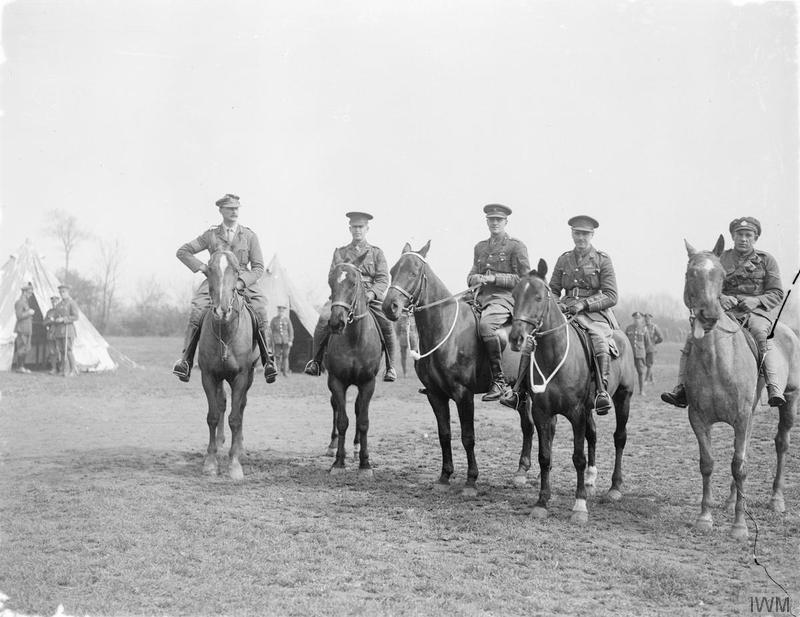
Brig-Gen James Heriot-Maitland, commander of 98th Brigade, with officers of 1st Bn Middlesex Regiment near Cassel, 25 April 1918.

However, on 16 April the Germans launched an attack out of the morning fog, annihilated a company of 4th King's and captured Méteren from the 2nd New Zealand Entrenching Battalion. Brigadier-General Heriot-Maitland, commanding 98th Bde, ordered up his reserve, 1st Middlesex, to retake the village, but by the time it arrived the Germans were streaming through the gap between the New Zealanders and 4th King's, held up only by flanking fire from 19th Bde and dismounted men from 5th Battalion, Tank Corps, manning Lewis guns. Nevertheless, the divisional pioneer battalion (18th Middlesex) and the 11th Field Company Royal Engineers made a spirited counter-attack with the bayonet to support 4th King's, and shored up the line behind the village. (Note: The presence of the machine-gunners from the Tank Corps seems to have led the German regiment to claim that it had fought off attacks by several tanks.)

On 17 April the brigade's front was reinforced by the 32nd and 116th Chasseurs à pied battalions from the 133rd French Division as well as the Tank Corps' machine-gunners. A heavy bombardment came down at 09.00, and half an hour later German columns were seen moving among some hedges about 1,000 yards (910 m) away: these were halted by fire from 2nd Argylls and 5th Tank Corps. Every German attempt to advance was halted by fire, and they withdrew at about 11.00. After a short bombardment at 18.00 the enemy attacked again along the whole of the 98th Bde's position, working their way up through some houses and capturing a farm held by the Chasseurs . However, they were thrown out by a counter-attack by parts of 4th King's and 1st Middlesex.

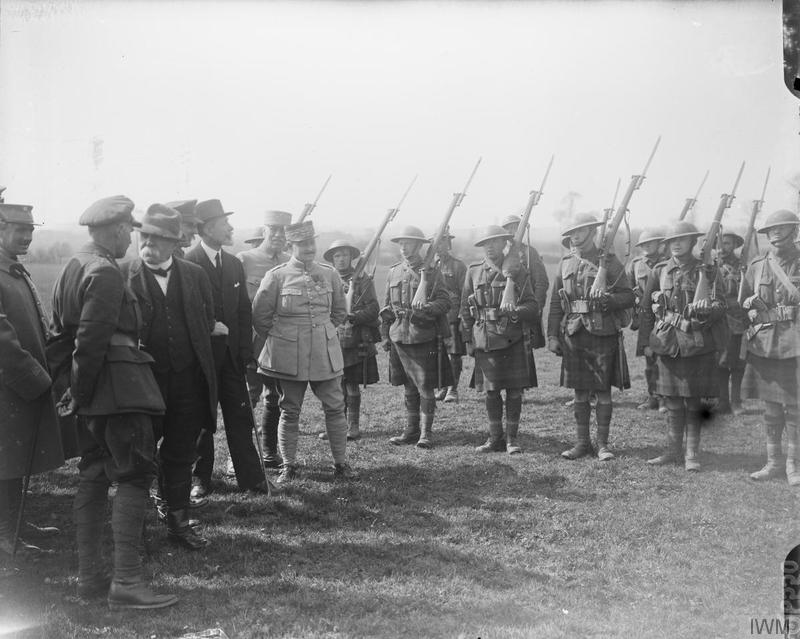
Georges Clemenceau (third from left) inspects 2nd Bn Argyll & Sutherland Highlanders at Cassel, 21 April 1918.

By now the German offensive had lost impetus, and fresh Allied formations were arriving. 33rd Division was relieved and went to a back area at Cassel, west of Ypres. The French Prime Minister, Georges Clemenceau, was visiting at the time, and asked to see a British brigade that had just come out of the fight. He was shown 98th Bde, which was only about 1000 strong. On seeing how weak it was, he exclaimed, 'Mon Dieu, c'est tout!'

When the division had rested and absorbed reinforcements, it went back into the line in the area of Ridge Wood, about 3 miles (4.8 km) SSW of Ypres, where there was almost constant low-intensity fighting associated with the French at nearby Mont Kemmel. 98th Brigade Trench Mortar Battery distinguished itself in this fighting. Ridge Wood itself changed hands several times; it was finally captured on 14 July by 6th Division, assisted by two companies from 98th Bde.

On 15 July, groups from the US Army's 30th Infantry Division began arriving to learn trench warfare from 33rd Division in the Ypres Salient. Officers from the American Expeditionary Forces had visited 98th Bde's battalions as early as January, now the training began. From 25 July the American infantry units began rotating with those of 33rd Division in the front line, and by 17 August the 30th US Division held the whole Canal sector. The British units, too, had to introduce their raw reinforcements to the front line. A number of trench raids were carried out, including one successful one by 1st Middlesex on 'Scottish Wood'.

=== Hundred Days Offensive ===
The Allies launched their Hundred Days Offensive at the Battle of Amiens on 8 August. 33rd Division was not involved until it was brought into reserve for the Battle of Épehy on 18 September. On 21 September 19th and 98th Bdes cooperated in an attack by 58th (2/1st London) Division to close up to the Hindenburg Line near Villers-Guislain. 4th King's and 2nd Argylls gained a little ground by 'bombing' their way down trenches from the north, but finding no sign of 19th Bde they withdrew again; these trenches were successfully occupied after dark by 19th Bde. A new attack was arranged for 21.30 on 22 September: once again 2nd Argylls went forward, but 19th Bde was again delayed, and 2nd Argylls were driven out at 09.00 next morning after they ran out of bombs. Both brigades attacked during the night of 23/24 September to fill the gap between them, but although 1st Middlesex attacked at 03.00 they were again unable to hold the trenches they had taken.

For the Battle of the Canal du Nord on 29 September, 33rd Division was supposed to be occupying Villers-Guislain and ground vacated by the Germans under pressure from the flanks, but as 98th Bde's three battalions advanced in line behind a Creeping barrage at 03.30 they were checked by Germans filtering back into Villers-Guislain and by resistance at 'Gloucester Road'. Next day it was discovered that the Germans had abandoned Villers-Guislain and by 1 October the brigade had reached the crossings of the St Quentin Canal. 33rd Division crossed on 4 October without any heavy fighting, and occupied the Hindenburg Support line before going into reserve.

The division was back in the line for the Battle of Cambrai on 9 October. There were few formal defences and the advance was essentially a pursuit. 33rd Division advanced by brigade groups (19th Bde leading), accompanied by artillery but with no barrage unless called for. It advanced 7.5 miles (12.1 km) in the day, patrols reaching the River Selle, which they found to be held in strength. Next day 98th Bde took over and closed up to the river, getting some outposts across during the night. 2nd Argylls held their outpost next day, but 4th King's were driven out by British shells falling short. The Royal Engineers bridged the river and 100th Bde crossed in force on 13 October before the division was relieved to prepare for the next setpiece attack (the Battle of the Selle).

The battle to take the high ground beyond the Selle began on 20 October, 33rd Division joining in on 23 October. 1st Middlesex, leading 98th Bde behind a creeping barrage that started at 02.00, reached its first objective, the village of Forest, by 03.30, taking hundreds of prisoners. When the barrage moved on again at 03.52, 4th King's took the lead and continued to the second objective by 07.00. However, it ran into strong opposition before the third objective; two companies of 1st Middlesex were sent up to turn the enemy's flank, but 4th King's had reached the objective on the far side of the Harpies stream. 2nd Argylls then took up the advance, closely followed by a battery of 18-pounder field guns and a section of 4.5-inch howitzers from 156th (Camberwell) Brigade, Royal Field Artillery and the divisional medium mortars. The battalion made good progress until it was held up by fire from Ferme Paul Jacques at the top of a ridge. However, after darkness fell at 17.00 the battalion 'dribbled' men forward, enveloped and took the farm and established its outposts along the ridge, just short of the fourth objective. At 04.00 the brigade launched an attack that took a strongly-wired trench. By now, however, the battalions were had suffered significant casualties and were very tired, so 100th Bde passed through to continue the advance. The brigade needed time to reorganise: 1st Middlesex, for example, had a frontline strength of only had 90 other ranks, and was formed into a single composite company. The stronger 4th King's enveloped Englefontaine on 26 October, liberating large numbers of French civilians sheltering in the cellars.

The last setpiece battle for the BEF was the Battle of the Sambre on 4 November, after which it pursued the beaten German forces. 33rd Division took up the lead on its front on the morning of 5 November until it reached the River Sambre itself. 98th Brigade then took up a line between the river and the Forêt de Mormal until after dark, when 1st Middlesex and then 2nd Argylls crossed the river on a floating cork bridge. Next day, while the Royal Engineers built bridges for the artillery, the infantry cleared the villages in front. On 7 November the brigade pushed on again against weak opposition: the guns were across the river by now and their barrages were sufficient to clear rearguards from the villages and woods. 33rd Division was relieved that night. The Armistice with Germany was signed before it went back into the line.

The brigade was at Sassegnies near Aulnoye when the Armistice came into force on 11 November, and went into billets around Caullery. Between 6 and 17 December it marched back to the Amiens area. Demobilisation proceeded rapidly in 1919, and the division and its brigades ceased to exist on 30 June.

98th Brigade was not reactivated during World War II.

== Commanders ==
The following officers commanded the brigade during its existence:

- Brigadier-General Joseph Maria Gordon, appointed to original 98th Bde 7 December 1914
- Brig-Gen R.G. Gordon-Gilmour, CVO, CB, DSO, appointed to 118th Bde 22 September 1914
- Brig-Gen E.P. Strickland, CMG, DSO, from 16 November 1915
- Lieutenant-Colonel H.C. Copeman, acting 11 June 1916
- Brig-Gen F.M. Carleton, from 12 June 1916
- Brig-Gen C.R.G. Mayne, temporary from 28 August 1916
- Brig-Gen J.D. Heriot-Maitland, from 1 September 1916
- Brig-Gen L.J. Wyatt, from 8 November 1918
