= Henry Crabb-Boulton =

Henry Crabb-Boulton (c.1709 – 8 October 1773) was a British Member of Parliament and Director and Chairman of the East India Company.

He was born Henry Crabb, the son of Hester Crabb, a London widow. He inherited in 1746 the properties of her cousin Richard Boulton, an East India director from 1718 to 1738 whose surname he adopted in addition to his own.

In early life he worked as a clerk in the East India Company's offices in London as paymaster and as clerk to the Shipping Committee (1737 to 1757). In 1753 he was elected a Director of the East India Company for the first time, holding the position for the conventional 3 years. He was afterwards re-elected in 1758, 1763, 1767 and 1772. In 1764 he served as deputy chairman and was chairman the following year and again in 1768 and 1773. From 1755 he was described as a merchant.

In 1754 he was elected MP for Worcester, retaining the seat until his death in 1773.

He died unmarried.

== See also ==
- List of East India Company directors

Parliament of Great Britain
Preceded by Thomas Vernon; Robert Tracy	Member of Parliament for Worcester; 1754–1773; With: Thomas Vernon 1754–1761; John Walsh 1761–1773	Succeeded by John Walsh; Thomas Bates Rous
