= Warfield =

Village in Berkshire, England

Coordinates: 51.442°N 0.737°W

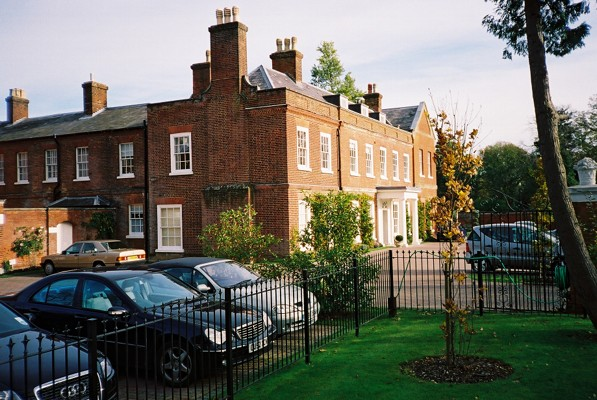
- Newell Hall

- Location within Berkshire
- Population: 11,260 (2021)
- OS grid reference: SU8772
- Civil parish: Warfield
- Unitary authority: Bracknell Forest
- Ceremonial county: Berkshire
- Region: South East
- Country: England
- Sovereign state: United Kingdom
- Post town: BRACKNELL
- Postcode district: RG42
- Dialling code: 01344
- Police: Thames Valley
- Fire: Royal Berkshire
- Ambulance: South Central
- UK Parliament: Maidenhead Bracknell (minor)

Warfield is a village and civil parish in the Bracknell Forest district, in the ceremonial county of Berkshire, England. In 2021 it had a population of 11,260.

== History ==
Warfield was originally an Anglo-Saxon settlement and is recorded in the Domesday Book as Warwelt [sic]. The name is believed to have originated from the Old English wær + feld, meaning 'Open land by a weir'. The medieval church is one of the finest in Berkshire, particularly noted for its Decorated Period chancel with beautiful carvings and 'Green Men'. It is a Grade II* listed building and located on Church Lane, ¾ of a mile north-east of the modern centre of the village. It is dedicated to the archangel Michael. The area around the church has been designated a conservation area since 1974 primarily to protect the character and nature of this historical building.

There are several memorials to the Stavertons who lived at the old manor house in the moat at Hayley Green. This was replaced, in the Georgian period, by Warfield House alias Warfield Grove, the home of Admiral Sir George Bowyer and, later, the political writer, Sir John Hippisley. Another fine old country house was Warfield Park. In the 18th century, it was the home of John Walsh, the Secretary to Lord Clive and an amateur scientist, and later to his niece, Margaret Benn Walsh and her descendants the Lords Ormathwaite. It was pulled down in 1955. Warfield Hall, built in the 1840s, is the former home of Field Marshal Sir Charles Brownlow.

== Geography ==
The area of Warfield known as Hayley Green has on its border a local nature reserves called Hayley Green Wood.

== Local government ==
Warfield is a civil parish, with a parish council that first met in 1894. It is one of six towns and parishes that make up the Bracknell Forest. Warfield residents are represented by councillors on Bracknell Forest Council from the wards of Binfield North & Warfield West, and Winkfield & Warfield East.

== Demography ==
Men in the Warfield Harvest Ride ward had the highest life expectancy at birth, 90.3 years, of any ward in England and Wales in 2016.

== Notable residents ==
- Kerry Ingram (1999-), actress (Matilda the Musical, Game of Thrones)

== Freedom of the Parish ==
The following people and military units have received the Freedom of the Parish of Warfield.

=== Individuals ===
- Colleen Dulieu: 30 July 2023.
