= John Walsh (British scientist) =

British scientist and Secretary to the Governor of Bengal (1726-1795)

John Walsh FRS
- Born: 1 July 1726; Fort St. George, Madras (Chennai), India
- Died: 9 March 1795 (aged 68); Mayfair, Westminster
- Known for: Work on the electrical properties of torpedo fish
- Father: Joseph Walsh
- Relatives: Nevil Maskelyne (cousin)
- Awards: Copley Medal
- Scientific career
- Fields: Politics, physiology
- Workplaces: East India Company

John Walsh (1 July 1726 – 9 March 1795) was a British scientist and Secretary to the Governor of Bengal.

John was born in Fort St. George, son of Joseph Walsh, Secretary to the Governor of Fort St. George and cousin to Nevil Maskelyne, the Astronomer Royal, and his cousin Margaret Maskelyne, the wife of Lord Clive.

== Life ==
He entered the English East India Company at the age of fifteen and eventually became Clive's private secretary. During the 1757 Plassey campaign against the Nawab of Bengal, Siraj ud-Daulah, John Walsh was awarded £56,000 in prize money. Upon his return to England in 1759, his fortune was estimated at £147,000, and he quickly sought to purchase the necessary trappings of aristocratic power in eighteenth century Britain: land and political influence. In late 1764, Walsh purchased the large estate of Warfield Park, near Bracknell in Berkshire and spent the next two years doing it up. He was MP for Worcester from 1761 to 1780. He continued to serve Robert Clive, or 'Clive of India' as he became known, and attempted to form a parliamentary interest in his favour.

In 1778 the major of the Worcestershire Militia died soon after the regiment had been embodied for home defence duties during the American War of Independence. The Lord Lieutenant of Worcestershire appointed Walsh to the vacancy. This caused great dissatisfaction among the other officers who were passed over, and it was some time before they were persuaded to withdraw their threats of resignation. In 1781 he was promoted to lieutenant-colonel of the regiment, from which he resigned in 1787.

=== Electrical properties of torpedo fish ===
In later life, John Walsh's interests were scientific, with a particular interest in electric fish. He was elected a Fellow of the Royal Society in 1770 and awarded their Copley Medal in 1773 for a paper on the electrical properties of torpedo fish.

=== Death ===
John Walsh died in 1795 at his home in Mayfair. He left his fortune to his niece, Margaret Walsh, and her husband, John Benn, on the condition that they change their surname to Benn-Walsh. With his own fortune of £80,000 made in India while Assistant to the Resident of Benares, his brother-in-law Francis Fowke in the 1770s, John Benn-Walsh had become a very wealthy man and went on to inherit extensive estates in Warfield, Buckinghamshire, in Radnorshire, and in Ormathwaite, Cumberland and be created Baron Ormathwaite.

Parliament of Great Britain
Preceded by Thomas Vernon; Henry Crabb-Boulton	Member of Parliament for Worcester; 1761–1780; With: Henry Crabb-Boulton 1761–73; Thomas Bates Rous 1773-74; Nicholas Lechmere 1774; Thomas Bates Rous 1774-80	Succeeded by William Ward; Thomas Bates Rous
