= Matthias Attwood =

British politician and banker

Member of Parliament for Whitehaven
- In office 15 December 1832 – 28 August 1847
- Preceded by: New constituency
- Succeeded by: Robert Hildyard

Member of Parliament for Boroughbridge
- In office 2 August 1830 – 3 December 1832 Serving with Charles Wetherell
- Preceded by: George Mundy; Henry Dawkins
- Succeeded by: Constituency abolished

Member of Parliament for Callington
- In office 12 June 1820 – 31 July 1830 Serving with Alexander Baring (1826–1830); William Thompson (1820–1826)
- Preceded by: Edward Pyndar Lygon; Christopher Robinson
- Succeeded by: Bingham Baring; Alexander Baring

Member of Parliament for Fowey
- In office 24 March 1819 – 11 May 1819 Serving with Alexander Glynn Campbell
- Preceded by: George Lucy; Alexander Glynn Campbell
- Succeeded by: Ernest Edgcumbe; Alexander Glynn Campbell

Personal details
- Born: 24 November 1779
- Died: 11 November 1851 (aged 71)
- Party: Conservative/Tory
- Spouse: Susannah Twells (m. 1806)
- Children: Matthias Wolverley Attwood
- Parent(s): Matthias Attwood; Ann Adams
- Relatives: Thomas Attwood (brother)

Matthias Attwood (24 November 1779 – 11 November 1851) was a British Conservative and Tory politician, and banker.

Attwood was the second son of ironmaster Matthias Attwood of Hawne House, Halesowen, Worcestershire and Ann née Adams, and the brother of Thomas Attwood. In 1806, he married Susannah, daughter of William Twells of Birmingham. They had at least one son, Matthias Wolverley Attwood, who became Conservative Member of Parliament (MP) for Greenwich.

He joined the family bank—Spooner, Attwood and Holman—as a partner, and in 1810 and 1811 he became a prominent pamphleteering opponent of the resumption of cash payments, converting publicist William Cobbett, while his brother, Thomas, led the opposition to the orders in council at Birmingham. From 1820, he began to promote and direct numerous public companies.

His campaigning led to Attwood's decision to stand for election to parliament, and he was recommended to the Tory MP for Fowey, George Lucy. While Lucy was not initially convinced, only Attwood was found to be willing to risk the election and shoulder the expense of the canvas. Lucy also believed Attwood would support the government on all matters except resumption, and had no qualms about voting against Catholic relief. At a by-election in 1819, he was successful but, less than two months later, he was unseated in favour of Ernest Edgcumbe without being able to do anything in parliament.

Attwood returned to parliament the next year after succeeding, after an election petition arising from the 1820 election, to take the seat of Callington and held that seat for 10 years. In 1830, he switched his attention to Boroughbridge, where he was elected as one of two members. When this seat was abolished at the 1832 general election, he became MP for Whitehaven, and held that seat for 15 years until 1847, when he did not seek re-election.

Parliament of the United Kingdom
Preceded by George Lucy; Alexander Glynn Campbell	Member of Parliament for Fowey; Mar. 1819–May 1819; With: Alexander Glynn Campbell	Succeeded by Ernest Edgcumbe; Alexander Glynn Campbell
Preceded by Edward Pyndar Lygon; Christopher Robinson	Member of Parliament for Callington; 1820–1830; With: Alexander Baring (1826–1830); William Thompson (1820–1826)	Succeeded by Bingham Baring; Alexander Baring
Preceded by George Mundy; Henry Dawkins	Member of Parliament for Boroughbridge; 1830–1832; With: Charles Wetherell	Constituency abolished
New constituency	Member of Parliament for Whitehaven; 1832–1847	Succeeded by Robert Hildyard
