= Frederick Knight (politician) =

English politician

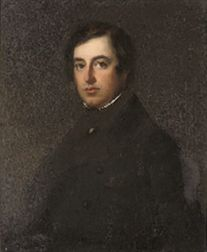
- Portrait of Frederic Winn Knight as a young man

Member of Parliament for West Worcestershire
- In office 1841–1885 Serving with Henry Lygon (1841-1853); Viscount Elmley (1853–1863); William Edward Dowdeswell (1863–1866); Sir Edmund Lechmere, Bt (1866–1885)

Personal details
- Born: 9 May 1812
- Died: 3 May 1897 (aged 84)
- Party: Conservative
- Spouse: Maria Gibbs (m. 1850)
- Children: 1
- Parent: John Knight II (father)
- Relatives: George Allanson-Winn (grandfather); Eric Ayshford Knight (nephew)
- Military career
- Rank: Colonel
- Units: Worcestershire Yeomanry Cavalry; 1st Battalion Worcestershire Rifle Volunteers

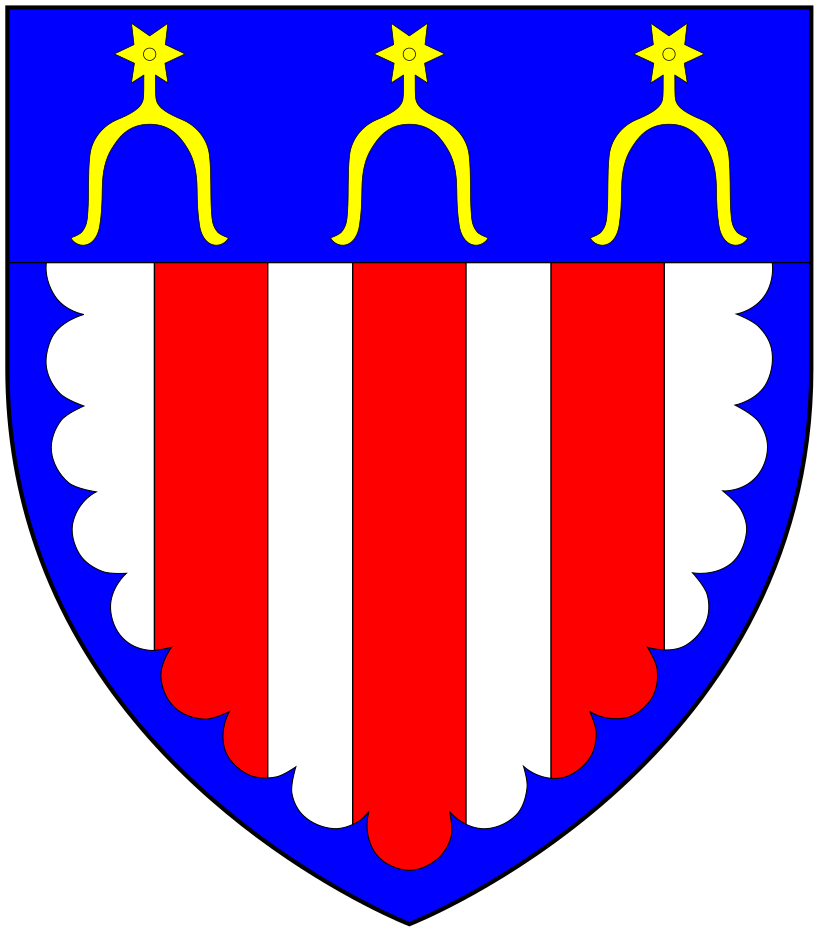
Arms of Knight: Argent, three pales gules within a bordure engrailed azure on a chief of the last three spurs or

Colonel Sir Frederick Winn Knight KCB (9 May 1812 – 3 May 1897) was an English Conservative politician who sat in the House of Commons from 1841 to 1885.

== Origins ==
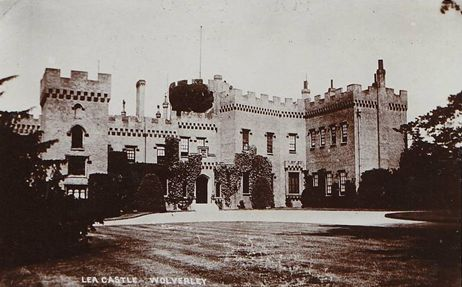
Lea Castle, Wolverley, postcard photograph c. 1900. Built after 1809 by John Knight I, ironmaster. Sold by his son John Knight II (1765-1850) in about 1818 to finance his purchase of Exmoor Forest. Demolished 1945 with the exception of the gatehouse which still stands. A series of watercolours c. 1816 of the interiors of Lea Castle attributed to the painter John Carter (1748-1817) is held by the Metropolitan Museum of Art, New York, Elisha Whittelsey Collection, no. 56.601(4)

Frederick Knight was the eldest son of John Knight II (d.1850) of Lea Castle, Wolverley, (2 miles north of Kidderminster) Worcestershire and 26 miles east of Downton Castle) (built by his father John Knight I) and 52 Portland Place in London, by his wife Hon. Jane Elizabeth Allanson-Winn, daughter of George Allanson-Winn, 1st Baron Headley. His grandfather, John Knight I of Lea Castle was an ironmaster and the grandson of Richard Knight of Downton Castle, Downton on the Rock, Herefordshire, (about five miles west of Ludlow, Shropshire) a magnate in the iron industry. He had at least two brothers:

- Charles Allanson Knight (1814–1879) who married Jessie Ramsay (1828–1922), daughter of William Ramsay (1800–1881) (a.k.a. Innes) of Barra, Inverurie, and widow of Count Alexander de Polignac(d.pre-1862). His children were under the guardianship of the Fane Family of Fulbeck Hall, Lincolnshire, between 1876 and 1887. W.D. Fane wrote in his correspondence of Summer 1855 of visiting his friend "Knight" in Rome, probably at the house of John Knight II who had retired to Rome.
- Edward Lewis Knight (1817–1882), of Hornacott Manor, Boyton, Cornwall. He married three times:
  - Firstly to Elizabeth Harris
  - Secondly in 1868 to Henrietta Mary Sanford, by whom he had issue, see section below, heir.
  - Thirdly 1877 to Edith Emma Butler (1851–1936)

== Career ==
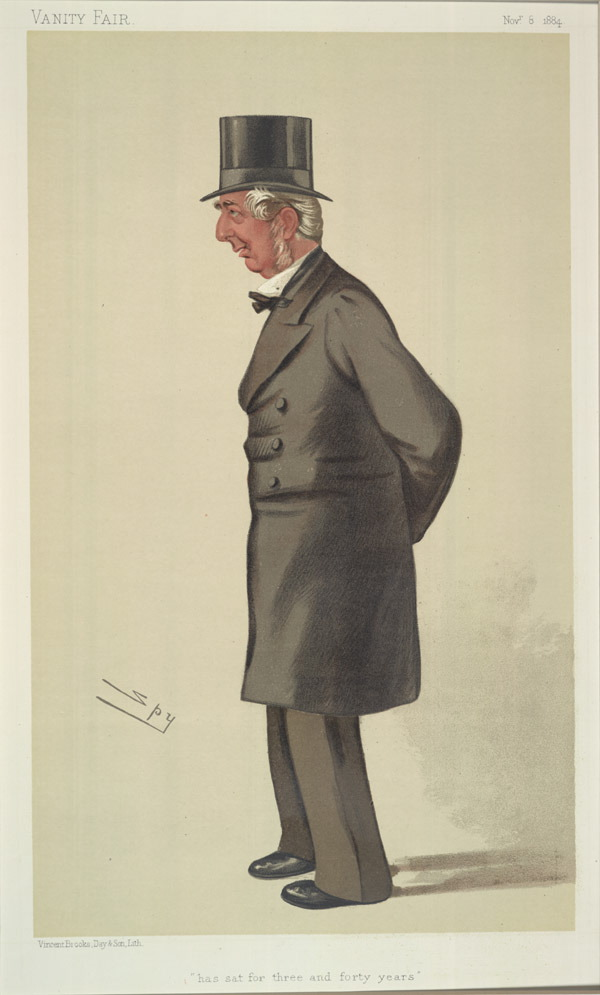
"Has sat for three and forty years". Caricature of Frederick Winn Knight, MP, by Spy published in Vanity Fair, 1884

He was educated at Charterhouse School and was lieutenant-colonel of the Worcestershire Yeomanry Cavalry and of the 1st Battalion Worcestershire Rifle Volunteers, raised by him after 1859, for which service he received a knighthood. He was Deputy Lieutenant and JP for Worcestershire and was a family trustee of the British Museum, as representative of Richard Payne Knight (1750–1824) of Downton Castle, the classical scholar and elder brother of his great-great-grandfather Edward Knight (d.1780). In 1841, Knight was elected Member of Parliament for West Worcestershire. He was Parliamentary Secretary to the Poor Law Board under Lord Derby's Governments of 1852 and 1858–9. He held his parliamentary seat until 1885, for a remarkably long continuous period of 44 years, remarked on in the Vanity Fair caricature of him by Spy of the previous year captioned: "has sat for three and forty years".

== Exmoor reclamation ==
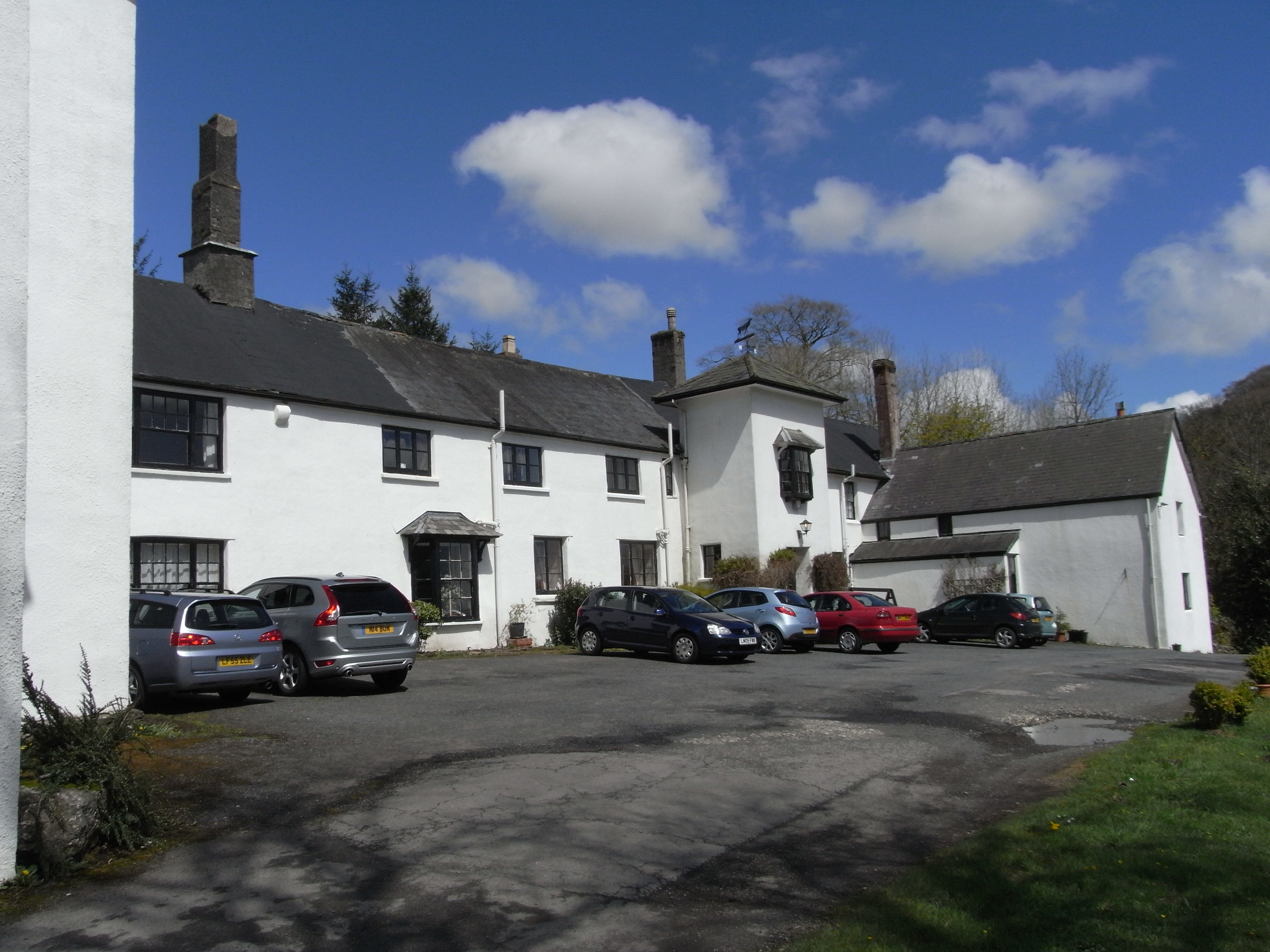
Simonsbath House, today the Simonsbath House Hotel

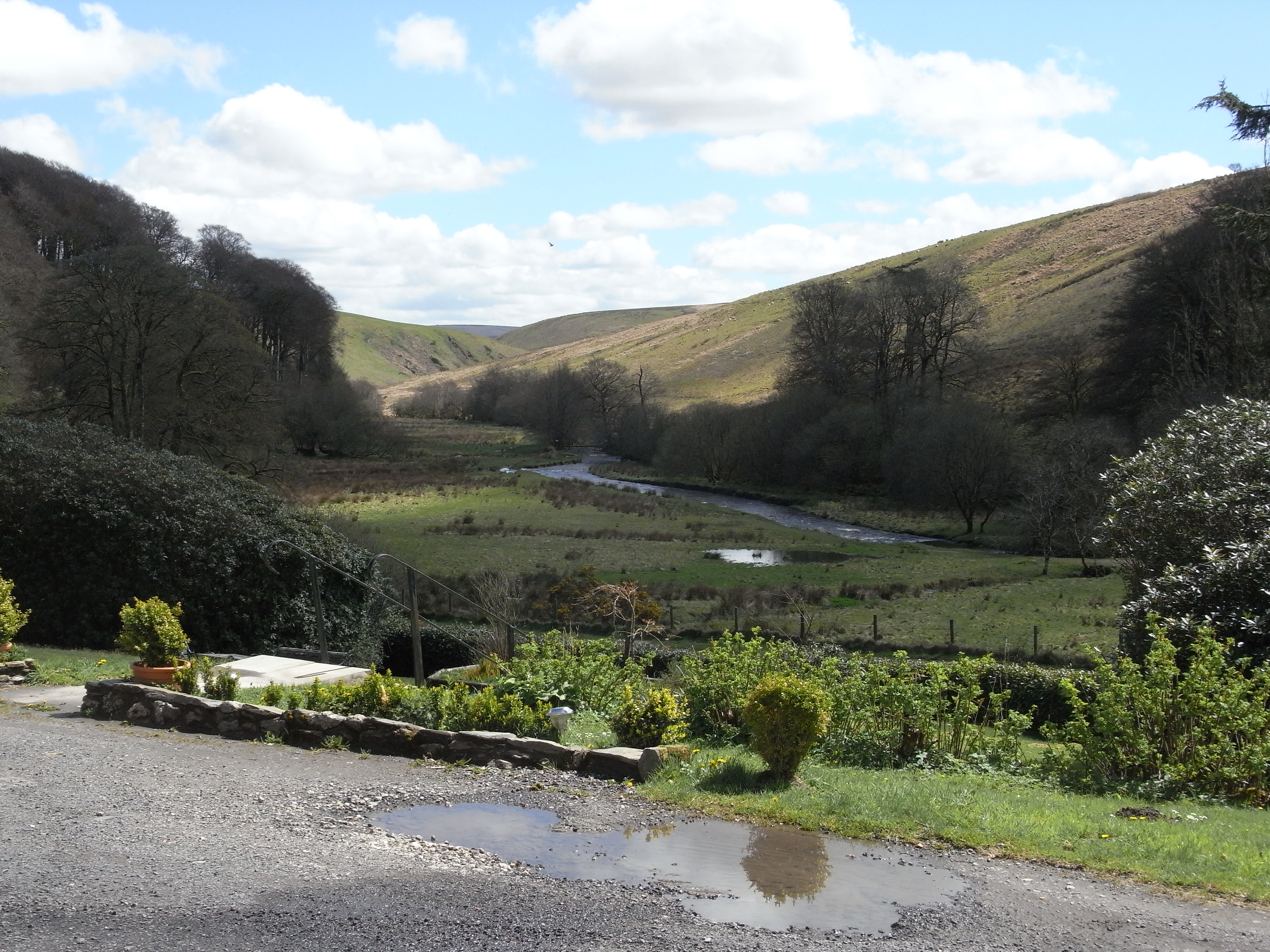
View from Simonsbath House downstream along the River Barle

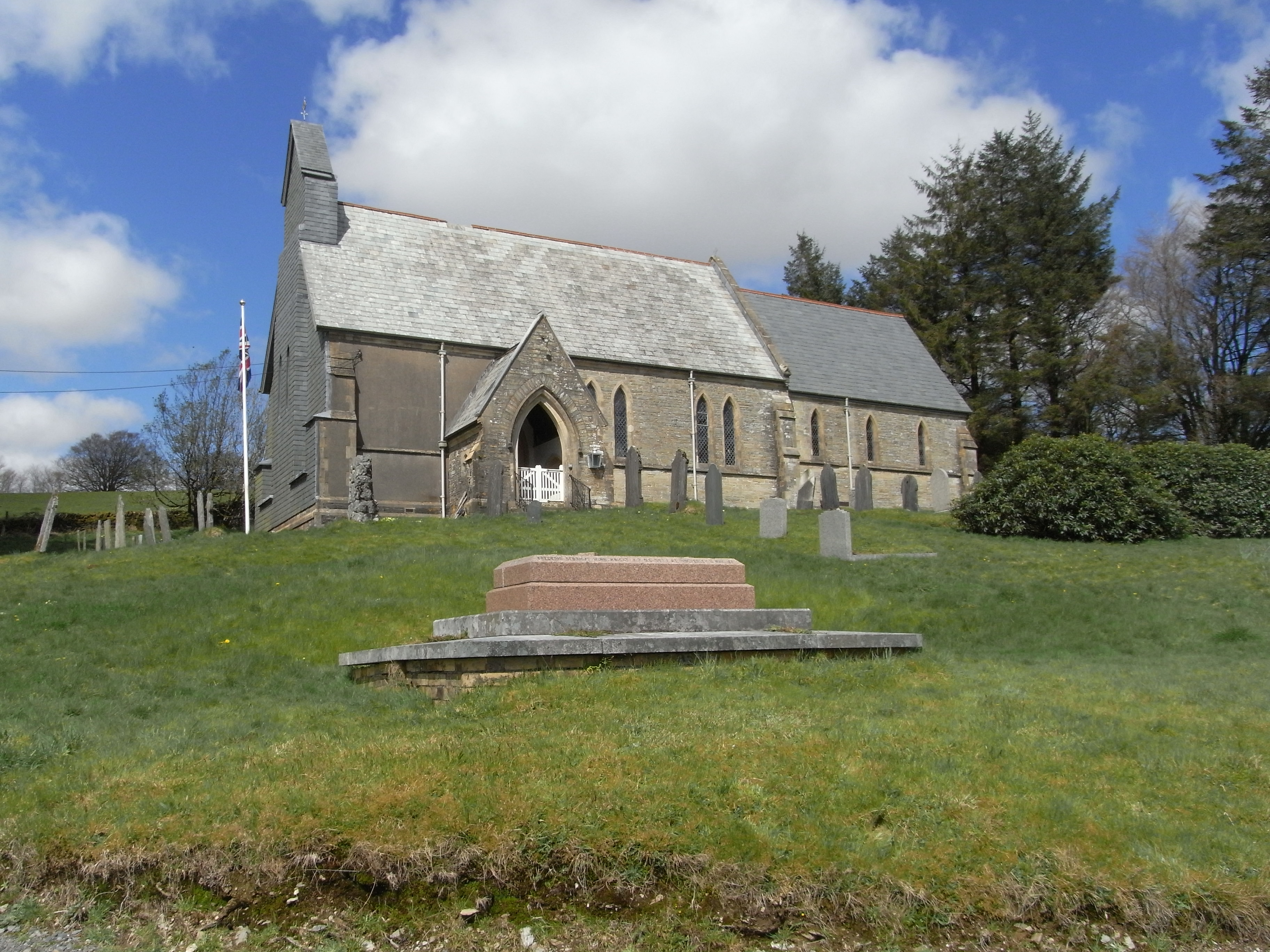
Exmoor Parish Church of St Luke, Simonsbath, viewed from the south, built by Sir Frederick Knight (d.1897), consecrated 1856. In the foreground is the pink granite tomb monument of his son Frederick Sebright Knight (1851-1879) on which the names of his parents were also inscribed

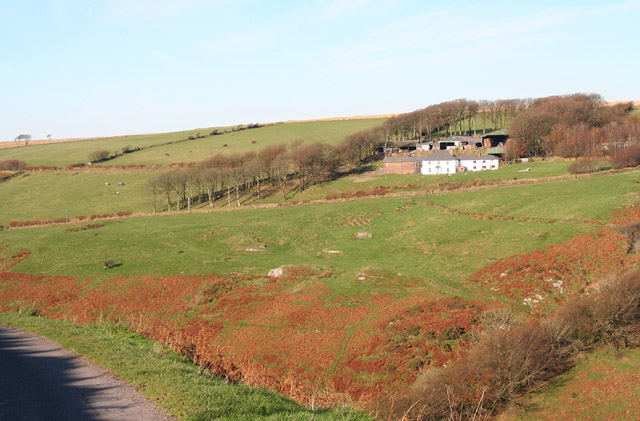
Warren Farm, Exmoor, the best preserved of all the original Knight farmsteads

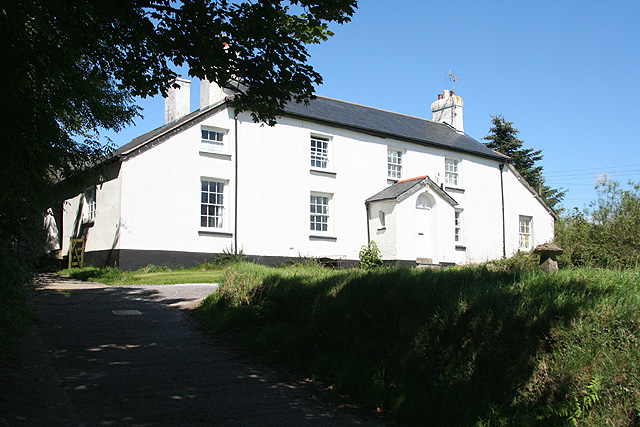
Red Deer Farm, Exmoor, which later became the Gallon House Inn; today it is the Red Deer Nursery School

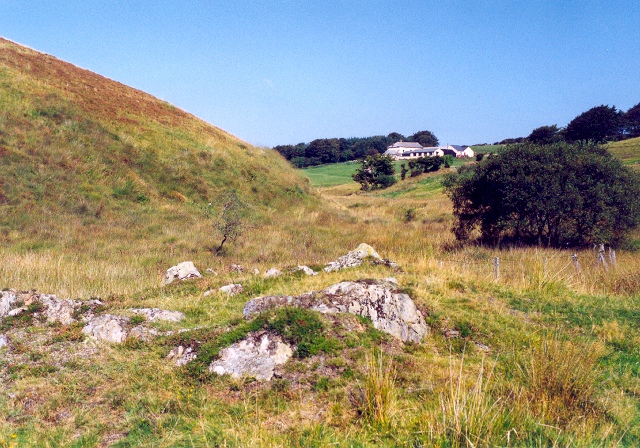
Pinkworthy Farm, Exmoor

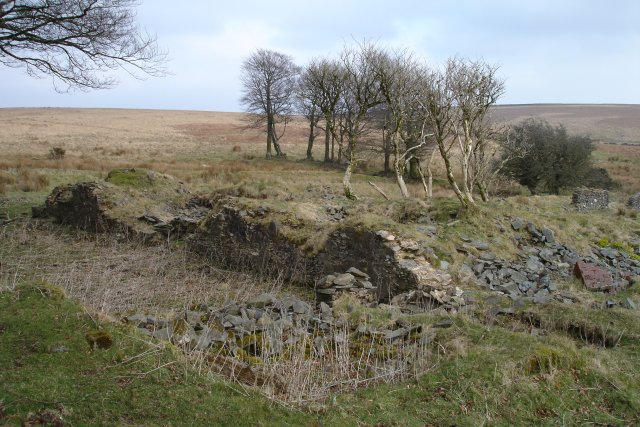
Ruins of Larkbarrow Farm, Exmoor

Knight took over from his father in managing the 10,262 1/4 acre estate, (subsequently increased to about 20,000 acres) formerly the royal forest of Exmoor, Somerset, purchased for £50,122 by public tender by his father in August 1818 from King George III's Commissioners of Woods, Forests and Land Revenues. His father had commenced the great task of reclaiming the rough grazing of the high moors, all over 1,000 ft, to arable production, and had built two farmsteads, Honeymead and Cornham, to the east and west respectively of his own residence at Simonsbath House, Simonsbath, formerly the only residence on the forest, built by James Boevey (1622–1696) in 1654, which already had enclosed farmland of 108 acres.

There existed a familial connection between the Knights and the Bampfylde Baronets (from 1831 Barons Poltimore), lords of the manor of North Molton, which large manor was adjacent to the west side of the royal forest of Exmoor. Col. Coplestone Warre Bampfylde (d. 29 August 1791), Colonel of the Somerset Militia and nephew of Sir Coplestone Warwick Bampfylde, 3rd Baronet (c. 1689–1727), had married Mary Knight, 2nd daughter of Edward Knight of Wolverley, Worcestershire.

In 1841 John Knight II withdrew from the task and retired to Rome, and Frederick took up the task with much vigour. He built 15 further farmsteads and changed his father's policy of "in-hand" farming of the forest as one huge entity to one of colonising the moor with tenant farmers who would bear the risks and rewards of the farming operations themselves and would pay him rents. This was during a time of great population expansion when it was widely feared that food supplies would inevitably run short. The political situation was uncertain and revolution was feared unless the price of food could be reduced. Thomas Malthus had written in 1798: "The power of population is indefinitely greater than the power in the earth to produce subsistence for man". Both father and son were unsuccessful with the mining ventures they planned on Exmoor, although much expenditure was made in prospecting for minerals and one mine-shaft was sunk, named Wheal Eliza. A large pond known as Pinkworthy Pond, was dug on The Chains, a boggy expanse of moorland in the NW corner of the forest, the purpose of which is unknown, but was possibly to drive mill machinery. Knight was a keen sportsman and also valued his Exmoor estate for the stag-hunting, which had been practised there with hounds for centuries. He also encouraged the abandonment of his father's determined policy of attempting to grow wheat, more suited to lowlands, and sought to introduce a pastoral system using sheep. He is said to have largely designed many of the farmstead lay-outs himself, and these have been found to the present day to be well sheltered and well drained. Most of Knight's farmsteads survive today, only 5 having been demolished or partly so, namely:

- Cloven Rocks,
- Pinkworthy, farm buildings demolished, house remains, sold by Lady Margaret Fortescue in 1959.
- Titchcombe,
- Larkbarrow, requisitioned in WWII for artillery practice and destroyed by shelling.
- Tom's Hill.

The remaining farms and house which survive are:

- Simonsbath House, sold by Lady Margaret Fortescue in 1959.
- Horsen, sold by Lady Margaret Fortescue in 1959.
- Wintershead, sold by Lady Margaret Fortescue in 1959.
- Driver, sold by Lady Margaret Fortescue in 1959.
- Emmett's Grange, sold by Lady Margaret Fortescue in 1959. Built in 1840, it was the home of Knight's land agent Robert Smith and included cowhoses for thirty-five animals, a relatively large herd for the period. It is the highest farmhouse on Exmoor at 1,250 ft. The house is larger than a simple farmhouse and clearly was built as an elegant Georgian residence. Elements of landscape tree-plantings survive in the grounds. In the 1930s it was rented as a hunting lodge from Hugh Fortescue, 5th Earl Fortescue (1888–1958) by his younger brother Hon. Denzil Fortescue who later became Denzil Fortescue, 6th Earl Fortescue (1893–1977) The property at present (2012) includes 900 acres. It is owned by the Barlow family, of whom Lucy Barlow is a joint-master of the Dulverton West Foxhounds. The property is let-out to paying guests on a weekly basis.
- Warren. This is the most perfectly preserved of the historic Knight farmsteads. It was sold by the Fortescues to the Exmoor National Park Authority which sold it in 1983 to its tenant-farmer, Mr Hawkins, who later served as a joint-master of the Devon & Somerset Staghounds. It is occupied in 2012 by his son Andrew Hawkins and his wife a Councillor on Exmoor Parish Council.
- Simonsbath Barton
- Cornham
- Duredon
- Honeymead: Now modernised beyond recognition. Sold by Earl Fortescue in 1927 to the industrialist and director of Royal Dutch Shell Sir Robert Waley Cohen (1877–1952), who had leased it since 1924. This was the first separate disposal made from the former Exmoor Forest. Waley Cohen purchased Honeymead with 1,745 acres, including Winstitchen Allotment and Exe Cleave Allotment, together with the farmsteads of Pickedstones, Winstitchen and Red Deer (a.k.a. Gallon House), comprising most of the eastern part of the former forest. Sir Robert brought modern farming techniques to Exmoor, and bred prize-winning herds of Friesian dairy cattle, Red Ruby Devon cattle, Exmoor Horn and Devon Closewool sheep. He also pioneered the planting of tree shelter belts as an addition to the traditional wall and beech hedge-banks. Sir Robert's son, Sir Bernard Waley-Cohen (1914–1991), was Lord Mayor of London (1960–61) and Chairman of the Devon and Somerset Staghounds for many years. He was created a baronet, "of Honeymead in the County of Somerset" in 1961. He continued to farm at Honeymead but gave up the dairy cattle. It is still owned by the Waley-Cohen family, which retains 1,000 acres.
- Gallon House (formerly Red Deer)
- Pickedstones
- Winstitchen

After the early death of his son aged 28 in 1879, Knight sold the reversion after his death of Exmoor to Viscount Ebrington, Master of the Devon and Somerset Staghounds, the future Hugh Fortescue, 4th Earl Fortescue (1854–1932), whose family's principal seat was Castle Hill, Filleigh, 10 miles SW of Simonsbath. In 1927 the Fortescues sold 1,745 acres with Honeymead, Gallon House, Pickedstones and Winstitchen to Sir Robert Waley Cohen. The remainder of the estate continued to be held by the Fortescues until after the death of the 5th Earl in 1958, when the latter's eldest daughter and co-heiress, Lady Margaret Fortescue (b. 1923), sold much of the "Simonsbath Estate", as the former Royal Forest was termed by the family, together with much of the two Fortescue estates centred on Challacombe and West Buckland, to pay large death duties. The Simonsbath Estate properties sold were as follows, per the sales particulars headed "The Challacombe Estate and part of the Exmoor Estate, North Devon" dated 18 September 1959:

  - Driver Farm, Simonsbath, Exmoor
  - Driver Cottages, Driver Farm, Simonsbath, Exmoor
  - Pinkery Farm, Simonsbath, Exmoor
  - Hoar Oak Herding, Lynton and Lynmouth
  - Exmoor Forest Hotel, Simonsbath, Exmoor
  - Emmetts Grange Farm, Simonsbath, Exmoor
  - Wintershead Farm, Simonsbath, Exmoor
  - Wintershead Cottages, Wintershead Farm, Exmoor
  - 1 Wintershead Cottages, Simonsbath, Exmoor
  - Horsen Farm, Simonsbath, Exmoor
  - Wintershead Cottages, Horsen Farm, Exmoor
  - 2 Wintershead Cottages, Simonsbath, Exmoor

It was a decision Lady Margaret said in 2001 that she then regretted, but had been advised at the time not to burden the remaining estate with the large borrowing required to meet the tax bill. She did however retain what she termed "the heart of the Exmoor estate", comprising Simonsbath Barton and Cornham, and started to farm this land in-hand using her own employees, not renewing tenancies on farms when they expired. She established five large flocks of sheep and two large cattle herds, the latter based at Cornham and Simonsbath Barton. Simonsbath sawmill was closed down as it was unprofitable. In 1989 Lady Margaret handed over the family estates to her daughter the Countess of Arran, who later on sold the remainder of the Simonsbath estate to John Ewart, a keen follower of the Staghounds, whilst Exmoor National Park purchased much of the moorland. Some of the houses however were retained where occupied by retired Fortescue employees. Ewart farmed under the name "Exmoor Forest Farms". In June 2006 Ewart offered Simonsbath Barton estate for sale via estate agents Savills and Strutt & Parker. The land offered comprised 2,080 acres freehold and a further 3,788 acres rented under a grazing licence from Exmoor National Park expiring in 2031. Also included was a 5-bedroom house, another of 4 bedrooms and a range of buildings and cottages. The asking price was £4 1/2 million.

On his 1818 purchase Knight's father had accepted a contractual potential liability of having to build a parish church at Simonsbath should the population expand to the size to need one, and this became the case in 1845 when 18 residents of his estate put forward a petition stating a church was then needed. The Church of St Luke, about 1/2 mile to the east and uphill of Simonsbath House, was finally consecrated in 1856, and a new parish called Exmoor was created to cover the whole estate which had always been extra-parochial. Knight gave 12 acres to form the churchyard.

Some of the Knight plans for Exmoor, never realised, are revealed by documents held at Somerset Archives:

"Two letters from John Knight of Simonsbath to Charles Bailey, Nynehead, concerning a rail road, with inclined planes, from Porlock to Exmoor Forest, 1826-7. Letter, with prospectus, from the Somersetshire and North Devon Junction Railway Company, concerning the extension of a line to Porlock, and the proposed development of the harbour, dependent on the good will of Capt. Blathwayt, 1845. Plan, on scale of 2 miles to one inch, showing Exmoor with G.W.R. railway, and a proposed ropeway between Porlock Bay and Picketstones Shaft, itself lying between Rogers Shaft near Simonsbath and Withypool; undated. Blueprint, endorsed "Exmoor Ironstone Deposit", showing boundaries of Exmoor Forest, proposed railway, and tramway to pits or workings; undated. c. 1850-55. Agreement between George William Blathwayt and Frederick Winn Knight of Wolverley House (co. Worcs.), esq., M.P., concerning the construction of a double line of locomotive narrow gauge railway from the property of said Knight on the forest of Exmoor to the harbour of Porlock, 1860".

It would appear that the Knights' development of Exmoor gained them enemies as the following extract shows:

"Letter from John Knight, Simonsbath, Exmoor Forest, near South Molton, Devon, concerning the attempted murder of Osmond Lock (Mr Knights agent), who was shot in bed in his cottage at Exford, Somerset. Two shots were fired, the first just...

Date: 1834"

== Marriage and progeny ==
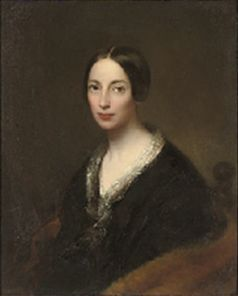
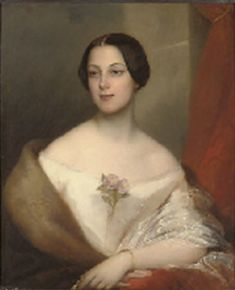
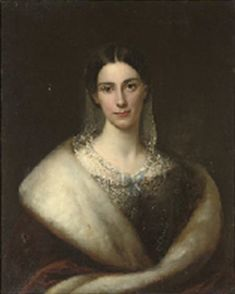
Portraits of ladies of the Knight family, English School, 19th century. Possibly the wife and/or sisters of Sir Frederic Knight (d.1897). All sold on 8 Jan 2008 by the Sebright Educational Trust at Christie's South Kensington

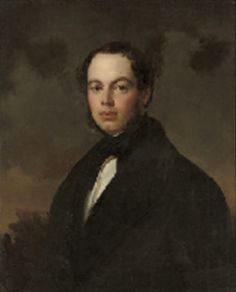
"Portrait of a gentleman of the Knight family, bust-length, in a black coat and white shirt, an extensive landscape beyond"; English School, 19th century. (Christie's catalogue entry). Sold 8 January 2008 with four other portraits of Knight family, property of the Sebright Educational Trust. Possibly a portrait of one of the brothers of Sir Frederic Winn Knight (d.1897)

In 1850 Knight married Maria Louisa Couling Gibbs (d.1900), daughter of E. Gibbs. They had one son, who predeceased both his parents aged only 28. They do not appear to have had any daughters as is suggested by the selection of his nephew as Knight's heir. Progeny:

- Frederic Sebright Winn Knight (1851–1879), JP, DL, who pre-deceased his parents. He was born at Wolverley and was appointed one of two Deputy Lieutenants for Somerset on 16 September 1878.

== Portraits ==
Five Knight family portraits were sold by the Sebright Educational Foundation at Christie's on 8 January 2008, in the style of the 19th-century English School, consisting of two young men and three young ladies, all in identical frames. Only one portrait was identified in the sale catalogue with certainty, namely that of Frederick Knight (1812–1897). It is likely the other young man was one of his brothers, and is unlikely to have been his son who died as a young man in 1879, the clothing fashion of which period is not represented in the portrait. The ladies are likely to be his sisters. The Sebrights were an ancient family of Wolverley, created Sebright Baronets in 1626. It must be assumed that the Knights were descended from a branch of this family, evidenced by the second forename of Sir Frederic's son, and by the fact the portraits came into the possession of the Sebright Educational Foundation, founded in 1620 under the will of William Sebright (1541–1620) of Besford, still existing today and very richly endowed.

== Death ==
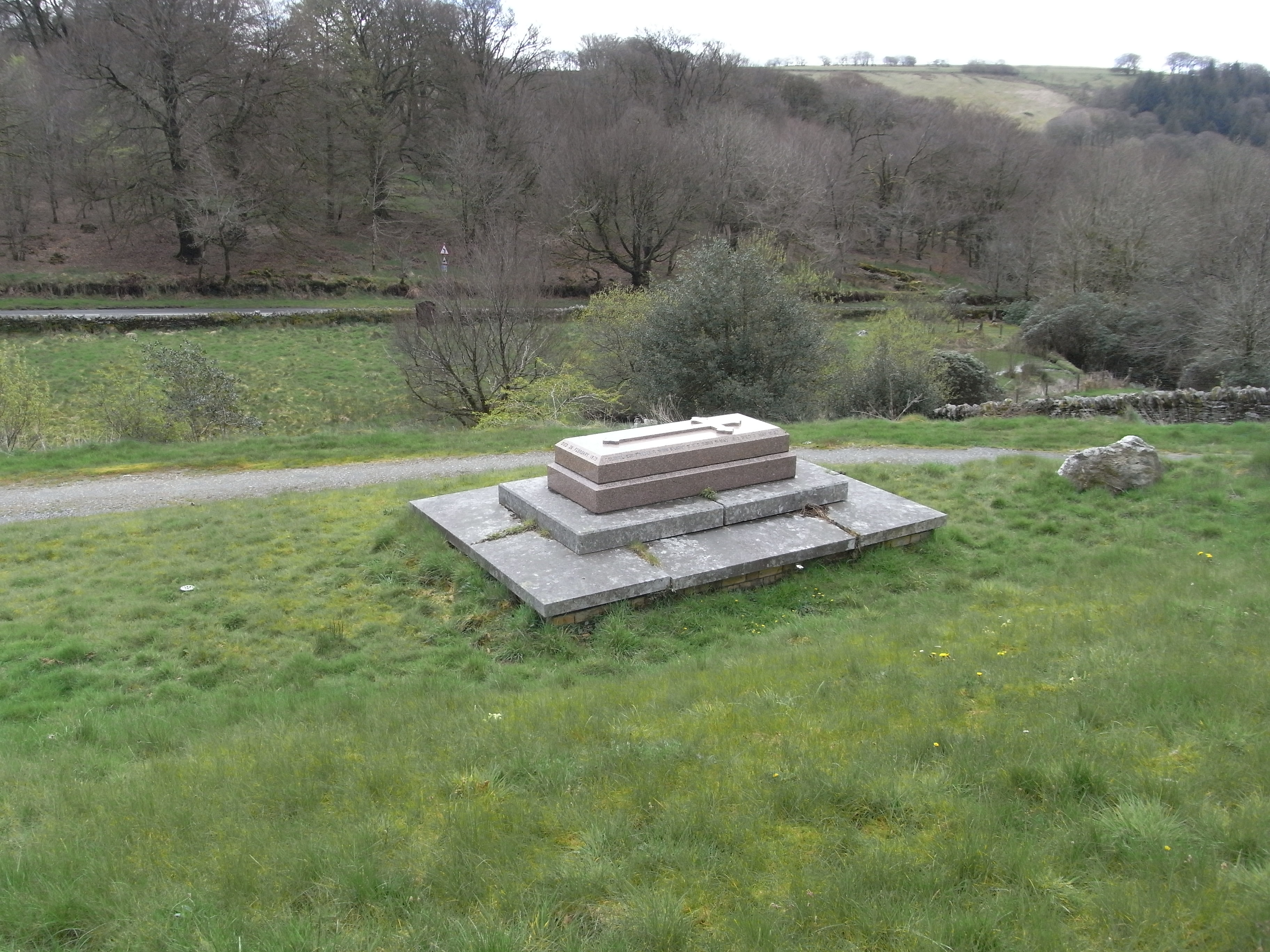
Memorial to Knight family, St Luke's Churchyard, Simonsbath, Exmoor Parish, Devon

Sir Frederic Knight died on 3 May 1897 as the inscription on the pink granite tombstone memorial to his son in Simonsbath churchyard records: "In memory of Frederic Sebright Winn Knight JP DL born at Wolverley 11 May 1851 died 28 February 1879. Colonel Sir Frederic Winn Knight KCB born 9 May 1812 died 3 May 1897. Also of Dame Florence Maria his wife who died December 9, 1900".

== Heir ==
His heir was his nephew Major Eric Ayshford Knight (1862/3-1944), the son of his younger brother Edward Lewis Knight (1817-1882) by his second wife Henrietta Mary Sanford (d.1876), daughter of Edward Ayshford Sanford (d.1876) MP, of Nynehead Court, Somerset. Edward Sanford was descended from John Sanford (1638–1711), son of Henry Sanford (1612–1644) of Nynehead Court by his wife Mary Ayshford (1606–1662), of Burlescombe, Devon. Through his mother John Sanford became the heir of the manor of Burlescombe, which he inherited from his cousin John Ayshford (1641–1689), whose mural monument exists in the Ayshford Chapel in the grounds of Ayshford Manor, Burlescombe. Eric Knight was Conservative MP for Kidderminster for four consecutive terms 1906–1922, Chairman of Kidderminster Rural District Council and Chairman of The Governors of Sebright School.

== See also ==
- Knight v Knight (1840) A famous legal case which set certain precedents in the common law relating to trusts. Provides genealogical information on Knight family.

Political offices
Preceded by Ralph Grey	Parliamentary Secretary to the Poor Law Board; 1852	Succeeded by Grenville Berkeley
Preceded by Ralph Grey	Parliamentary Secretary to the Poor Law Board; 1858-9	Succeeded by Charles Gilpin
Parliament of the United Kingdom
Preceded by Henry Winnington; Henry Lygon	Member of Parliament for West Worcestershire; 1841–1885; With: Henry Lygon to 1853; Viscount Elmley 1853–1863; William Edward Dowdeswell 1863–1866; Sir Edmund Lechmere, Bt 1866–1885	Constituency divided
