= Henry Lygon =

Henry Lygon may refer to:

- Henry Lygon, 4th Earl Beauchamp (1784–1863), British Army officer and politician
- Henry Lygon, 5th Earl Beauchamp (1829–1866), British politician
