= West Worcestershire =

UK Parliament constituency (1832–1885, 1997 onwards)

Coordinates: 52.15°N 2.30°W

- County constituency for the House of Commons
- Boundaries since 2010
- Boundary of West Worcestershire in West Midlands region
- County: Worcestershire
- Electorate: 73,001 (December 2010)
- Major settlements: Malvern, Pershore, Tenbury Wells and Upton-upon-Severn

Current constituency
- Created: 1997
- Member of Parliament: Harriett Baldwin (Conservative)
- Seats: One
- Created from: South Worcestershire, Leominster

1832–1885
- Seats: Two
- Type of constituency: County constituency
- Created from: Worcestershire
- Replaced by: Bewdley, Droitwich, Evesham, East Worcestershire and North Worcestershire

West Worcestershire is a constituency (Note: A county constituency (for the purposes of election expenses and type of returning officer)) in Worcestershire represented in the House of Commons of the UK Parliament since 2010 by Harriett Baldwin, a Conservative. (Note: As with all constituencies, the constituency elects one Member of Parliament (MP) by the first past the post system of election at least every five years.)

The constituency first existed from 1832 to 1885, formally known as the Western Division of Worcestershire, electing two MPs.

The current constituency, created in 1997, is considered a safe seat for the Conservatives, having been a marginal with the Liberal Democrats from 1997 to 2010. The constituency boundaries roughly correspond with the Malvern Hills District.

== Boundaries ==
=== 1832–1885 ===
The Petty Sessional Divisions of Upton, Worcester, Hundred House and Kidderminster, and the City and County of the City of Worcester.

=== 1997–2010 ===
- The District of Malvern Hills wards of Baldwin, Broadheath, Chase, Hallow, Kempsey, Langland, Laugherne Hill, Leigh and Bransford, Link, Longdon, Martley, Morton, Powick, Priory, Ripple, Temeside, The Hanleys, Trinity, Upton-on-Severn, Wells, West, and Woodbury; and
- The District of Wychavon wards of Bredon, Eckington, Elmley Castle, Pershore Holy Cross, Pershore St Andrew's, Somerville, and South Bredon Hill.

=== 2010–present ===
Under the Fifth periodic review of Westminster constituencies, the constituency was defined as comprising:

- The District of Malvern Hills; and
- the District of Wychavon wards of: Bredon, Eckington, Elmley Castle and Somerville, Pershore, and South Bredon Hill.

Boundary changes added an area including Tenbury Wells to the seat (formerly in the Leominster constituency) and transferred the small shared part of the Fladbury ward to the Mid Worcestershire seat.

As a result of a local government boundary review in Wychavon, which did not affect the parliamentary boundaries, the seat now comprises the following from May 2023:

- The District of Malvern Hills; and
- the District of Wychavon wards of: Bredon; Bredon Hill; Broadway, Sedgeberrow & Childswickham (small part); Eckington; Pershore;

The 2023 review of Westminster constituencies, which was based on the ward structure in place at 1 December 2020, left the boundaries unchanged.

West Worcestershire stretches from the Gloucestershire border in the south almost to Shropshire in the north, taking in Pershore and Bredon Hill in its eastern side. Its other major towns are Malvern in the west and Upton-upon-Severn in the centre.

== Constituency profile ==
The constituency boundaries roughly correspond with the Malvern Hills District. The seat is known for its hilly landscape: with products such as regional speciality cheeses, drinks and mineral water, a major economic sector is tourism and leisure. However, the principal industries are in agriculture; food; chemicals; distribution; waste and mineral processing; printing and publishing; and transport and retail.

Workless claimants who were registered jobseekers were in November 2012 significantly lower than the national average of 3.8%, at 2.1% of the population based on a statistical compilation by The Guardian.

The seat was broadly in line with the UK average in the 2016 referendum on the UK's status with the EU, with an estimated 52 to 53% voting to Leave.

== History ==
=== 1832–1885 ===
West Worcestershire formally, the Western division of Worcestershire, was created the first time for the 1832 general election, by the Reform Act 1832 which radically changed the boundaries of many British parliamentary constituencies. It was created by the division of the old Worcestershire constituency (which had existed since 1290) into two new two-member constituencies: West Worcestershire and East Worcestershire.

During this first creation, three members of the Lygon family, the Earls Beauchamp (pronounced Beecham) represented the constituency – their large country estate in the county had its seat at Madresfield Court near the heart of Madresfield village.

The constituency then existed, basically unchanged, until its abolition by the Redistribution of Seats Act 1885 for the 1885 general election, when the constituency's territory was variously incorporated into the seats of Bewdley, Droitwich, Evesham, East Worcestershire and North Worcestershire.

=== 1997–present ===
The seat was re-established for the 1997 general election on Parliament's approval of the Boundary Commission's fourth periodic review. It comprised the majority of the abolished constituency of South Worcestershire (excluding the town of Evesham), together with a small area transferred from Leominster.

Political history

In the first four elections the seat (in this modern creation) alternated between Conservative majorities that were quite marginal (7.8% and 5.3%) and those that were greater than 10%, at 12% and 12.7%, close to average in terms of security for any of the three largest parties. As never having had a majority that exceeded 15% of the vote and having had two marginal majorities to date, the seat could not be classified as safe.

Following the 2015 general election, this marginal profile between the Conservatives and Liberal Democrats drastically changed after the Liberal Democrats' share of the vote fell markedly, leaving West Worcestershire as a safe Conservative seat since, with the Conservatives easily achieving 50% of the vote share each election. However, by the time of the 2024 general election, the Liberal Democrats had recovered to come within 12% of the Conservatives once again, after the latter's vote share slumped to 36.2%.

== Members of Parliament ==
=== MPs 1832–1885 ===
Worcestershire West

Election	First member	First party	Second member	Second party
1832	Hon. Henry Lygon (Note: Later Earl Beauchamp)	Tory	Hon. Thomas Foley	Whig
1833 by-election	Hon. Henry Lygon	Tory	Henry Winnington	Whig
1834	Hon. Henry Lygon	Conservative	Henry Winnington	Whig
1841	Hon. Henry Lygon	Conservative	Frederick Knight	Conservative
1853 by-election	The Viscount Elmley (Note: Viscount Elmley is a courtesy title given by the Earl Beauchamp to his eldest son, as his main subsidiary title.)	Conservative	Frederick Knight	Conservative
1863 by-election	Hon. Frederick Lygon	Conservative	Frederick Knight	Conservative
1866 by-election	William Dowdeswell	Conservative	Frederick Knight	Conservative
1876 by-election	Sir Edmund Lechmere, Bt	Conservative	Frederick Knight	Conservative
1885	constituency abolished			

=== MPs since 1997 ===
South Worcestershire prior to 1997

Election	Member	Party
1997	Sir Michael Spicer	Conservative
2010	Harriett Baldwin	Conservative

== Elections ==
=== Elections in the 2020s ===
General election 2024: West Worcestershire
Party	Candidate	Votes	%	±%
Conservative	Harriett Baldwin	19,783	36.2	−24.5
Liberal Democrats	Dan Boatright	13,236	24.2	+6.1
Labour	Kash Haroon	8,335	15.2	−1.3
Reform	Christopher Edmondson	7,902	14.4	New
Green	Natalie McVey	5,068	9.3	+4.6
Party of Women	Seonaid Barber	363	0.7	New
Majority		6,547	12.0	−30.6
Turnout		54,687	69.0	−6.1
Conservative hold		Swing	−15.3	

=== Elections in the 2010s ===
General election 2019: West Worcestershire
Party	Candidate	Votes	%	±%
Conservative	Harriett Baldwin	34,909	60.7	−0.8
Liberal Democrats	Beverley Nielsen	10,410	18.1	+8.7
Labour	Samantha Charles	9,496	16.5	−7.2
Green	Martin Allen	2,715	4.7	+1.9
Majority		24,499	42.6	+4.8
Turnout		57,530	75.4	−0.5
Registered electors		76,267		
Conservative hold		Swing		

General election 2017: West Worcestershire
Party	Candidate	Votes	%	±%
Conservative	Harriett Baldwin	34,703	61.5	+5.4
Labour	Samantha Charles	13,375	23.7	+10.3
Liberal Democrats	Edward McMillan-Scott	5,307	9.4	−0.3
Green	Natalie McVey	1,605	2.8	−3.7
UKIP	Mike Savage	1,481	2.6	−11.8
Majority		21,328	37.8	−3.9
Turnout		56,471	75.9	+2.2
Conservative hold		Swing		

General election 2015: West Worcestershire
Party	Candidate	Votes	%	±%
Conservative	Harriett Baldwin	30,342	56.1	+5.7
UKIP	Richard Chamings	7,764	14.4	+10.5
Labour	Daniel Walton	7,244	13.4	+6.6
Liberal Democrats	Dennis Wharton	5,245	9.7	−28.0
Green	Julian Roskams	3,505	6.5	+5.3
Majority		22,578	41.7	+29.0
Turnout		54,100	73.7	0.0
Conservative hold		Swing		

General election 2010: West Worcestershire
Party	Candidate	Votes	%	±%
Conservative	Harriett Baldwin	27,213	50.4	+5.4
Liberal Democrats	Richard Burt	20,459	37.7	−1.2
Labour	Penelope Barber	3,661	6.8	−3.7
UKIP	Caroline Bovey	2,119	3.9	+0.7
Green	Malcolm Victory	641	1.2	−1.2
Majority		6,754	12.7	+6.7
Turnout		53,993	73.7	+3.7
Conservative hold		Swing	+3.3	

=== Elections in the 2000s ===
General election 2005: West Worcestershire
Party	Candidate	Votes	%	±%
Conservative	Michael Spicer	20,959	44.5	−1.5
Liberal Democrats	Tom Wells	18,484	39.3	+5.3
Labour	Qamar Bhatti	4,945	10.5	−3.5
UKIP	Caroline Bovey	1,590	3.4	−0.1
Green	Malcolm Victory	1,099	2.3	−0.2
Majority		2,475	5.2	−6.8
Turnout		47,077	70.3	+3.2
Conservative hold		Swing	−3.4	

General election 2001: West Worcestershire
Party	Candidate	Votes	%	±%
Conservative	Michael Spicer	20,597	46.0	+1.0
Liberal Democrats	Michael Hadley	15,223	34.0	−3.2
Labour	Waquar Azmi	6,275	14.0	−1.7
UKIP	Ian Morris	1,574	3.5	New
Green	Malcolm Victory	1,138	2.5	+0.5
Majority		5,374	12.0	+4.2
Turnout		44,807	67.1	−9.2
Conservative hold		Swing		

=== Elections in the 1990s ===
General election 1997: West Worcestershire
Party	Candidate	Votes	%	±%
Conservative	Michael Spicer	22,223	45.0	
Liberal Democrats	Michael Hadley	18,377	37.2	
Labour	Neil Stone	7,738	15.7	
Green	Sue Cameron	1,006	2.0	
Majority		3,846	7.8	
Turnout		49,344	76.3	
Conservative win (new seat)				

=== Elections in the 1880s ===
General election 1880: West Worcestershire (2 seats)
Party	Candidate	Votes	%	±%
Conservative	Edmund Lechmere	2,975	41.8	+0.3
Conservative	Frederick Knight	2,913	40.9	+4.4
Independent Liberal	Henry Richard Willis	1,231	17.3	New
Majority		1,682	23.6	+9.1
Turnout		4,175 (est)	60.0 (est)	−9.2
Registered electors		6,962		
Conservative hold		Swing		
Conservative hold		Swing		

=== Elections in the 1870s ===
By-election, 8 Jul 1876: West Worcestershire (1 seat)
Party	Candidate	Votes	%	±%
Conservative	Edmund Lechmere	Unopposed		
Conservative hold				

- Caused by Dowdeswell's resignation.

General election 1874: West Worcestershire (2 seats)
Party	Candidate	Votes	%	±%
Conservative	William Dowdeswell	2,910	41.5	N/A
Conservative	Frederick Knight	2,554	36.5	N/A
Liberal	George Hastings	1,540	22.0	New
Majority		1,014	14.5	N/A
Turnout		4,272 (est)	69.2 (est)	N/A
Registered electors		6,177		
Conservative hold		Swing	N/A	
Conservative hold		Swing	N/A	

=== Elections in the 1860s ===
General election 1868: West Worcestershire (2 seats)
Party	Candidate	Votes	%	±%
Conservative	William Dowdeswell	Unopposed		
Conservative	Frederick Knight	Unopposed		
Registered electors		6,311		
Conservative hold				
Conservative hold				

By-election, 24 March 1866: West Worcestershire
Party	Candidate	Votes	%	±%
Conservative	William Dowdeswell	Unopposed		
Conservative hold				

- Caused by Lygon's succession to the peerage, becoming 6th Earl Beauchamp.

General election 1865: West Worcestershire (2 seats)
Party	Candidate	Votes	%	±%
Conservative	Frederick Lygon	Unopposed		
Conservative	Frederick Knight	Unopposed		
Registered electors		5,221		
Conservative hold				
Conservative hold				

By-election, 26 October 1863: West Worcestershire
Party	Candidate	Votes	%	±%
Conservative	Frederick Lygon	Unopposed		
Conservative hold				

- Caused by Lygon's succession to the peerage, becoming 5th Earl Beauchamp.

=== Elections in the 1850s ===
General election 1859: West Worcestershire (2 seats)
Party	Candidate	Votes	%	±%
Conservative	Henry Lygon	Unopposed		
Conservative	Frederick Knight	Unopposed		
Registered electors		3,910		
Conservative hold				
Conservative hold				

General election 1857: West Worcestershire (2 seats)
Party	Candidate	Votes	%	±%
Conservative	Henry Lygon	Unopposed		
Conservative	Frederick Knight	Unopposed		
Registered electors		4,015		
Conservative hold				
Conservative hold				

By-election, 28 February 1853: West Worcestershire (1 seat)
Party	Candidate	Votes	%	±%
Conservative	Henry Lygon	Unopposed		
Conservative hold				

- Caused by Lygon's succession to the peerage, becoming 4th Earl Beauchamp

General election 1852: West Worcestershire (2 seats)
Party	Candidate	Votes	%	±%
Conservative	Henry Lygon	Unopposed		
Conservative	Frederick Knight	Unopposed		
Registered electors		4,135		
Conservative hold				
Conservative hold				

=== Elections in the 1840s ===
General election 1847: West Worcestershire (2 seats)
Party	Candidate	Votes	%	±%
Conservative	Henry Lygon	Unopposed		
Conservative	Frederick Knight	Unopposed		
Registered electors		4,357		
Conservative hold				
Conservative hold				

General election 1841: West Worcestershire (2 seats)
Party	Candidate	Votes	%	±%
Conservative	Henry Lygon	Unopposed		
Conservative	Frederick Knight	Unopposed		
Registered electors		4,577		
Conservative hold				
Conservative gain from Whig				

=== Elections in the 1830s ===
General election 1837: West Worcestershire (2 seats)
Party	Candidate	Votes	%
Conservative	Henry Lygon	Unopposed	
Whig	Henry Winnington	Unopposed	
Registered electors		4,654	
Conservative hold			
Whig hold			

General election 1835: West Worcestershire (2 seats)
Party	Candidate	Votes	%
Conservative	Henry Lygon	1,945	34.4
Whig	Henry Winnington	1,938	34.3
Conservative	John Pakington	1,773	31.3
Turnout		3,617	87.6
Registered electors		4,127	
Majority		7	0.1
Conservative hold			
Majority		165	3.0
Whig hold			

By-election, 16 May 1833: West Worcestershire
Party	Candidate	Votes	%
Whig	Henry Winnington	1,369	51.7
Tory	John Pakington	1,278	48.3
Majority		91	3.4
Turnout		2,647	84.8
Registered electors		3,122	
Whig hold			

- Caused by Foley's succession to the peerage, becoming 4th Baron Foley

General election 1832: West Worcestershire (2 seats)
Party	Candidate	Votes	%
Tory	Henry Lygon	Unopposed	
Whig	Thomas Foley	Unopposed	
Registered electors		3,122	
Tory win (new seat)			
Whig win (new seat)			

== See also ==
- Parliamentary constituencies in Herefordshire and Worcestershire
- Parliamentary constituencies in the West Midlands (region)

== Sources ==
Reference: Statutory Instrument 1987 No. 2208 The Parliamentary Constituencies (England) (Miscellaneous Changes) (No. 3) Order 1987
