= Edward Pyndar Lygon =

British Army officer and politician (1786–1860)

General The Honourable Edward Pyndar Lygon CB
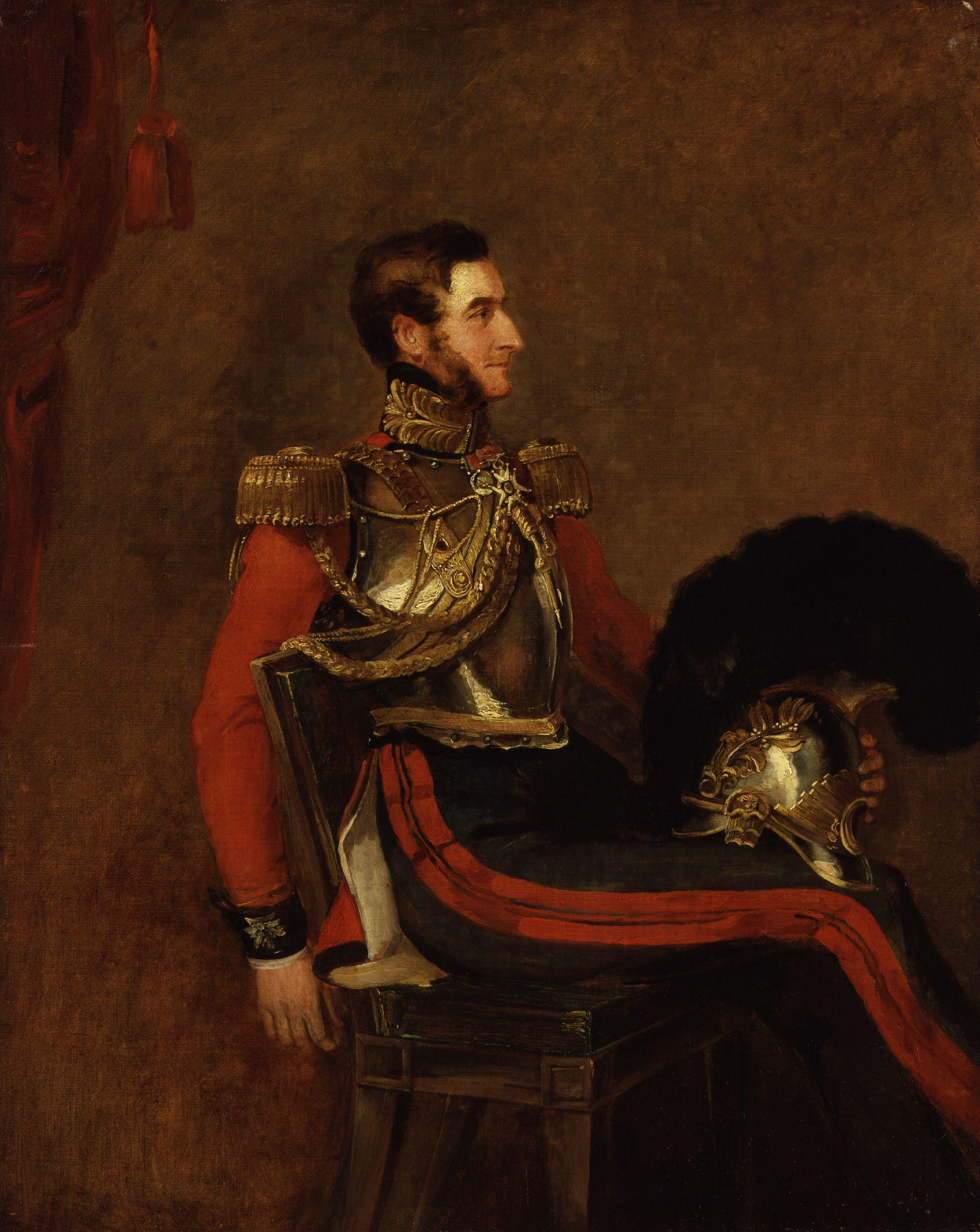
- Portrait by William Salter, 1834–1840

Member of Parliament for Callington
- In office 1818–1820 Serving with Sir Christopher Robinson
- Preceded by: Charles Trefusis; William Stephen Poyntz
- Succeeded by: Matthias Attwood; William Thompson

Personal details
- Born: 3 April 1786
- Died: 11 November 1860 (aged 74) London, England
- Parents: William Lygon, 1st Earl Beauchamp (father); Catharine Denn (mother)
- Relatives: Henry Lygon (brother); William Lygon (brother)
- Education: Westminster School
- Military career
- Allegiance: United Kingdom
- Branch: British Army
- Service years: 1805-1854
- Rank: General
- Unit: 13th Regiment of Light Dragoons
- Commands: 2nd Life Guards
- Conflicts: Peninsular War; Battle of Waterloo
- Other work: Member of Parliament

General Edward Pyndar Lygon CB (3 April 1786 – 11 November 1860) was a British Army officer and politician. He was the fourth son of William Lygon, 1st Earl Beauchamp and Catharine Denn, and the brother of Henry Lygon, 4th Earl Beauchamp, who also became a British Army general. Educated at Westminster School, Lygon entered the army in 1803 and rose to the rank of general, serving in major campaigns including the Peninsular War and the Battle of Waterloo. In addition to his military career, he represented Callington in the House of Commons from 1818 until 1820. Lygon lived at 12 St James's Square in London and remained unmarried until his death in 1860.

== Early life ==
Edward Pyndar Lygon was born on 3 April 1786, the fourth son of William Lygon, 1st Earl Beauchamp, and Catharine Denn. He belonged to the prominent Lygon family, whose influence extended across military, political, and social spheres in Worcestershire. Lygon was educated at Westminster School. In 1803, at the age of seventeen, he entered the British Army as a cornet in the 2nd Life Guards, beginning a military career that would eventually see him rise to the rank of general.

== Military career ==
Lygon was promoted to lieutenant in 1805, captain in 1808, and major, and he fought in the Peninsular War from 1812 to 1814. He was promoted to major and Lieutenant colonel in 1815 and commanded the 2nd Life Guards at the Battle of Waterloo. He was awarded the Companion of the Order of the Bath (CB) on 22 June 1815.

Further promotions as a staff officer included lieutenant colonel in 1818, colonel in 1822, major-general in 1837, and lieutenant-general in 1846. He was subsequently appointed Inspector General of Cavalry.

In January 1845, Lygon was given the colonelcy of the 13th Regiment of Light Dragoons, a position he held until his death. He was promoted to full general on 20 June 1854.

== Parliamentary career ==
In 1818, Lygon was elected as a Member of Parliament for Callington, a small borough in Cornwall, and held the seat until 1820. Callington was a so-called "rotten borough," where the influence of local patrons often determined electoral outcomes, and Lygon's election reflected the continuing political influence of his aristocratic family.

Although he was re-elected in March 1820, Lygon was unseated on petition the following June due to disputes over the validity of votes, a common occurrence in contested boroughs before the parliamentary reforms of the 19th century. During his brief tenure in the House of Commons, Lygon participated in parliamentary business as a representative of a family with strong ties to Worcestershire politics, although there are no surviving records of significant speeches or legislative initiatives associated with him. His parliamentary career was limited, and he soon focused on his military duties, which continued to occupy him in the years following his service in the Peninsular War and at the Battle of Waterloo.

== Death and legacy ==
He died on 11 November 1860 at his London residence, 12 St. James's Square, aged 74. He remained unmarried throughout his life and left no direct heirs. Lygon's death marked the end of his long and distinguished military career, during which he had risen to the rank of full general and held senior command positions, including Inspector General of Cavalry and colonelcy of the 13th Regiment of Light Dragoons.

Following his death, his estate and personal papers were managed in accordance with the family trust established by the Lygons of Madresfield Court, a family noted for its enduring influence in Worcestershire politics and military service. Lygon was buried in the family vault at Madresfield Church, Worcestershire.

The Lygon Arms in Chipping Campden was named after him.

Lygon Street in Melbourne, Australia, was also named in his honour.

Military offices
Preceded by Henry George Grey	Colonel of the 13th Regiment of (Light) Dragoons; 1845–1860	Succeeded by Allan Thomas Maclean
Parliament of the United Kingdom
Preceded by Hon. Charles Trefusis; William Stephen Poyntz	Member of Parliament for Callington; 1818–1820; With: Sir Christopher Robinson	Succeeded by Matthias Attwood; William Thompson
