= Madresfield =

Village in Worcestershire, England

Coordinates: 52.124346°N 2.287324°W

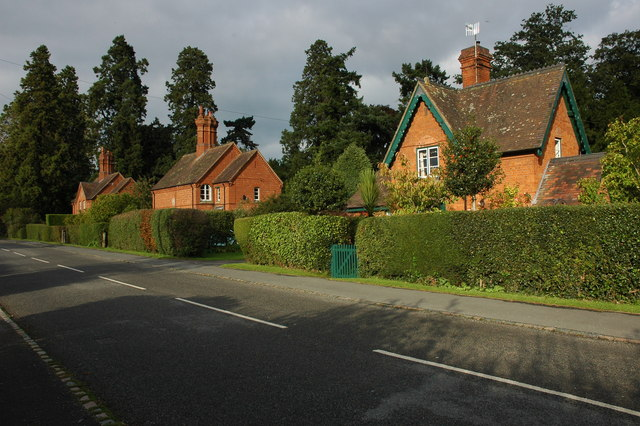
- Estate houses in the village

- Location within Worcestershire
- OS grid reference: SO804473
- Civil parish: Madresfield
- District: Malvern Hills
- Shire county: Worcestershire
- Region: West Midlands
- Country: England
- Sovereign state: United Kingdom
- Post town: MALVERN
- Postcode district: WR13
- Police: West Mercia
- Fire: Hereford and Worcester
- Ambulance: West Midlands
- UK Parliament: West Worcestershire

Madresfield is a village and civil parish in the administrative district of Malvern Hills in the county of Worcestershire, England. It is located about two miles east of Malvern town centre at the foot of the Malvern Hills and is less than two miles from the River Severn. Surrounded by farms and common land, it has a clear view of the entire range of the Malvern Hills, and is part of the informal region referred to as The Malverns.

== Etymology / Pronunciation ==
The name Madresfield derives from the Old English mǣðeresfeld, meaning either 'mower's field' or 'Maethhere's field'.

Madresfield is pronounced "Ma-ders Field" or "Ma-dres Field".

== History & Amenities ==
Madresfield is not mentioned in the Domesday Book of 1086, as it was part of the manor of Powick.

Madresfield is part of a Church of England parish which includes the neighbouring village of Guarlford. There is a parish church in the village (dedicated to St. Mary the Virgin). There have been three churches, the first a small chapel that was mainly used by the Beauchamps. A second church, built on marshy ground to the designs of Augustus Pugin, was demolished after only twelve years after becoming unsafe. The present church was built on land donated by the Earl Beauchamp and re-used many items from the earlier church. The church, dedicated to St Mary the Virgin, has a refurbished peal of bells which are on the visiting circuit of regional campanologists. The bells were rehung in December 2005 following recasting of 1 and 2 from the scrap metal of the old 4th and tenor and retuning the other bells., The village also has a primary school.

A Roman kiln was discovered on ground near Northend Farm, and near to what is now called Roman Way. There is an 800-year-old ditch alongside Townsend Way that was once the boundary to the ancient village of Madresfield.

The main road though the village was re-routed in the early 19th century to move it away from Madresfield Court. Many of the village houses were built just after this period.

The village boasted two village greens, Mathersfield Green near "Byways" and Bunn's Green on the corner of Northend Lane and Rectory Lane.

The first point-to-point racing amateur horseback race was held at Madresfield in 1836.

== Madresfield Court ==
The stately home, near the village centre has been the ancestral home for several centuries of the Lygon family, whose eldest sons took the title of Earl Beauchamp from 1815 until 1979, when the last Earl died. Distinguished collections of furniture and art are housed in the Court, which was rated by Simon Jenkins to be among the 50 best in his book on 1,000 historic houses. The house is managed by the Elmley Foundation, a British registered charity.

In the event of a German invasion threatening London, a 1940 government plan was to move the Royal Family to Madresfield.
