= William Robinson (law reporter) =

William Robinson (1801–1870) was an English lawyer, known as a law reporter.

== Life ==
The second son of Sir Christopher Robinson, he was born on 22 October 1801. He entered Charterhouse School in 1812, matriculated at Balliol College, Oxford, on 25 January 1819. He graduated B.A. on 22 March 1823, M.A. on 2 July 1829, and DCL on 11 July 1829.

Robinson was admitted to Doctors' Commons on 3 November 1830, and reported in the admiralty court. He died at Stanhope Villa, Charlwood Road, Putney, on 11 July 1870, aged 68.

== Works ==
Robinson's published volumes of reports commenced "with the judgments of the Right Hon. Stephen Lushington", and covered the years from 1838 to 1850. The first volume appeared in 1844, and the second in 1848. The third, without a title-page, and consisting of two parts only, was issued in 1852. They were also edited by George Minot at Boston in 1853.

These admiralty reports were a continuation of John Haggard's reports. For the purpose of citation, the name of WRobinson's admiralty reports may be abbreviated to W Rob Adm or Wm Rob or Rob (W). Sir Robert Phillimore said that a case reported in the first volume of these reports was much more fully and accurately reported in the first volume of the Notes of Cases.
