= Christopher Robinson (English judge) =

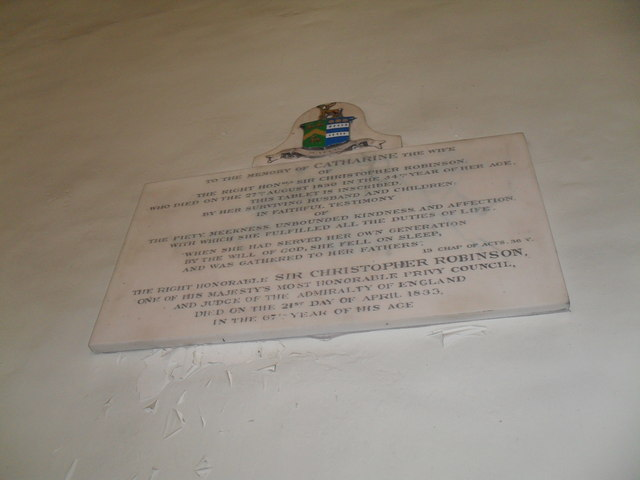
Memorial to Catherine and Christopher Robinson, St Benet Paul's Wharf

Sir Christopher Robinson (1766–1833), admiralty lawyer, and Judge of the High Court of Admiralty from 1828 to 1833.

== Life ==
Born in 1766, he was son of Dr. Christopher Robinson, rector of Albury, Oxfordshire, and Wytham, Berkshire, who died at Albury on 24 January 1802. He matriculated from University College, Oxford, on 16 December 1782, but migrated in 1783 to Magdalen College, where he was a demy from 1783 to 1799. He graduated B.A. 14 June 1786, M.A. 6 May 1789, and D.C.L. 4 July 1796. Intended for the church, Robinson preferred the profession of the law. He was one of nine children, and all that his father could spare for his start in life was 20l. in cash and a good supply of books.

Fortunately he obtained a favourable recommendation to Sir William Scott, afterwards Lord Stowell. He determined upon studying maritime law, and was admitted into the college of advocates on 3 November 1796. He gained conspicuous success in this branch of the profession, was knighted on 6 February 1809, and was appointed, on 1 March 1809, to succeed Sir John Nicholl as king's advocate.

As the holder of this office and the leading counsel in the admiralty court, Robinson was engaged in nearly all the cases relating to prizes captured on the seas. In 1818 he was returned in the interest of the tory ministry, exerted through the family of Kinsman, for the Cornish borough of Callington, and on the dissolution in 1820 he and his colleague secured at the poll a majority of the votes recorded by the returning officer, but a petition against their return was presented, and ultimately the candidates supported by the family of Baring were declared elected. These proceedings resulted in his being saddled with costs amounting to 5,000l., and though the premier had promised to reimburse him the outlay, the money was not paid. He was no orator, and did not shine in the House of Commons.

In 1821 Robinson followed Lord Stowell in the positions of chancellor of the diocese of London and judge of the consistory court, and on 22 February 1828 he succeeded Lord Stowell as judge of the high court of admiralty, having for several years previously transcribed and read in court the decisions of that judge. He was created a privy councillor on 5 March 1828, and presided in the admiralty court until a few days before his death.

He died at Wimpole Street, Cavendish Square, London, on 21 April 1833, and was buried in the churchyard of St. Benet's Doctors' Commons.

== Writing ==
Robinson was the author of:

- "Report of the Judgment of the High Court of Admiralty on the Swedish Convoy", 1799.
- "Translation of Chapters 273 and 287 of the Consolato del Mare, relating to Prize Law" [anon.], 1800.
- "Collectanea Maritima, a Collection of Public Instruments on Prize Law", 1801.
- "Reports of Cases argued and determined in the High Court of Admiralty, 1799 to 1808", 6 vols. 1799–1808; 2nd edit. 6 vols. 1801–8; they were also reprinted at New York in 1800–10, and by George Minot at Boston in 1853 in his series of English admiralty reports. Robinson's reports were not remunerative, and in some years caused him actual loss.

Robinson's own judgments were contained in volumes ii. and iii. of John Haggard's "Admiralty Reports" (1833 and 1840), and were also published at Boston by George Minot in 1853. A digested index of the judgments of Lord Stowell, as given in the reports of Robinson, Edwards, and Dodson, was issued by Joshua Greene, barrister-at-law, of Antigua, in 1818.

== Private life ==
He had married, at Liverpool, on 11 April 1799, Catharine, eldest daughter of the Rev. Ralph Nicholson, a man of considerable property. They had five children—three sons and two daughters. Lady Robinson died at Wimpole street on 27 August 1830, aged 53. Robinson's second son was William Robinson.

Parliament of the United Kingdom
| Preceded by Hon. Charles Trefusis; William Stephen Poyntz | Member of Parliament for Callington; 1818–1820; With: Edward Pyndar Lygon | Succeeded by Matthias Attwood; William Thompson |
