= George Lucy =

British landowner and Member of Parliament and High Sheriff

George Hammond Lucy
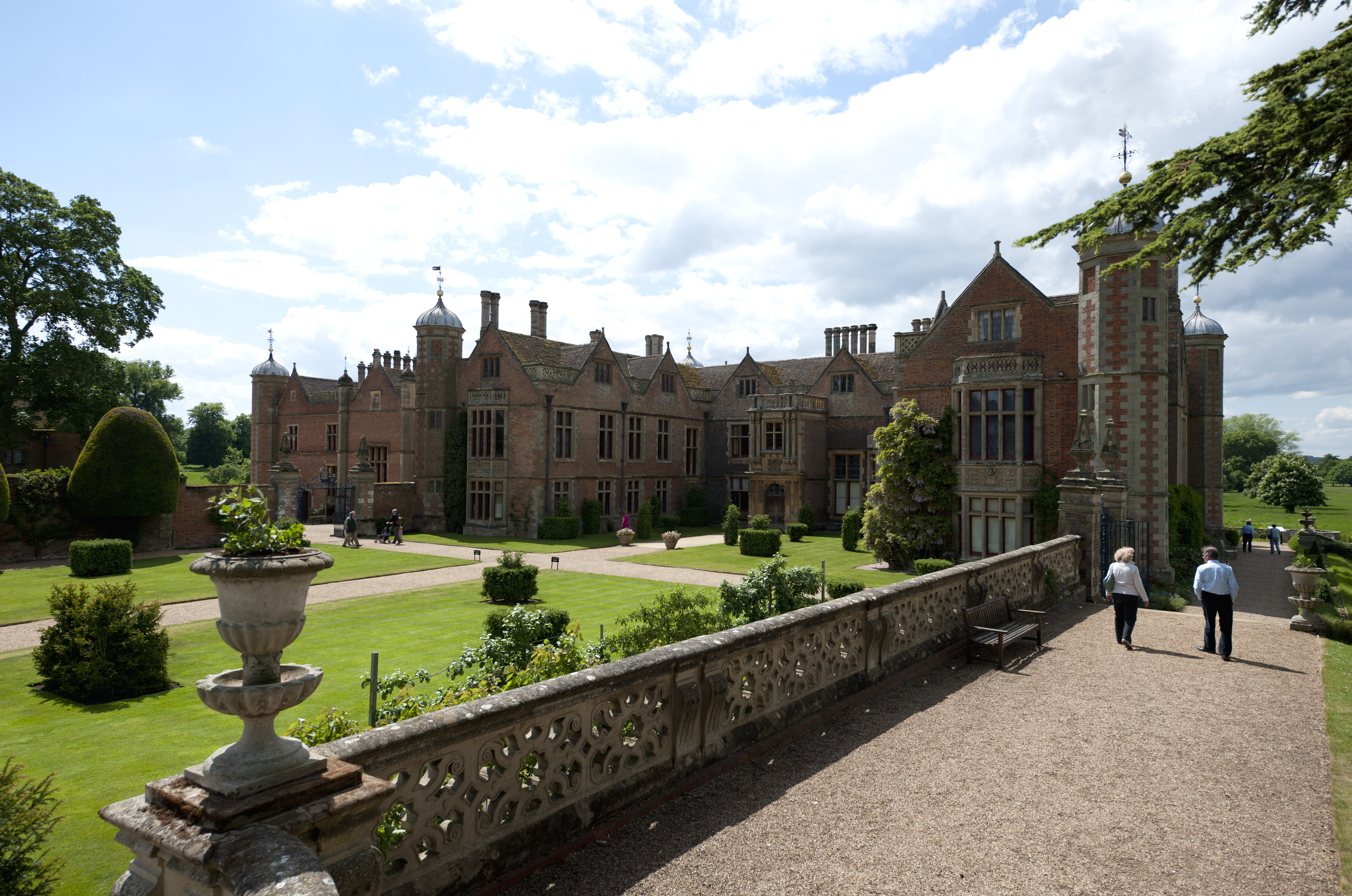
- Charlecote Park

Member of Parliament for Fowey
- In office 1818–1830
- Preceded by: Alexander Glynn Campbell
- Succeeded by: John Cheesment Severn

Personal details
- Born: 8 June 1789
- Died: 30 June 1845 (aged 56)
- Spouse: Mary Elizabeth Williams (m. 1823)
- Children: 5 sons and 2 daughters
- Education: Harrow School
- Alma mater: Christ Church, Oxford

George Hammond Lucy (1789–1845) was a British landowner, Member of Parliament and High Sheriff.

== Early life ==
He was born the son of the Rev. John Lucy, born John Hammond, of Charlecote Park, near Stratford-upon-Avon, Warwickshire and educated at Harrow School and Christ Church, Oxford. He succeeded his father to Charlecote Park in 1823.

== Career ==
His father bought him the Parliamentary seat at Fowey where he was elected in 1818, but then unseated on petition in 1819. Further expensive investment in the constituency enabled him to regain the seat in 1820 and retain it until 1830.

== Personal life ==
In 1823 he married Mary Elizabeth Williams, the daughter of Sir John Williams, 1st Baronet, of Bodelwyddan, Flintshire and with his wife undertook the restoration of a somewhat dilapidated Charlecote. He was pricked High Sheriff of Warwickshire for 1831–32.

He died in 1845 the father of 5 sons and two daughters. His portrait, painted by Friedrich von Amerling, hangs in Charlecote House, now a property of the National Trust.
