= Henry George Grey =

British Army general

General The Honourable Sir Henry George Grey GCB GCH
- Born: 25 October 1766; Northumberland
- Died: 11 January 1845 (aged 78)
- Military career
- Allegiance: United Kingdom
- Branch: British Army
- Service years: 1779–1845
- Rank: General
- Commands: 18th Dragoons; 17th Dragoons; Cape of Good Hope
- Conflicts: American Revolutionary War; French Revolutionary Wars; Flanders Campaign; Siege of Nieuwpoort; West Indies Campaign; Battle of Martinique; Napoleonic Wars

General Sir Henry George Grey GCB GCH (25 October 1766 – 11 January 1845) was a British Army officer who served as acting Governor of Cape Colony.

== Military career ==
Born the son of General Charles Grey, 1st Earl Grey, Henry joined the British Army as an ensign in the 26th Regiment of Foot on 29 November 1779. He soon afterwards transferred to become a cornet in the 19th Dragoons. Grey served throughout this period as an aide de camp to his father at Plymouth, being promoted to lieutenant on 28 July 1781 in the 30th Regiment of Foot and then transferring to the 17th Dragoons on 7 March the following year. He left his position with his father at the end of the American Revolutionary War in 1783. As a lieutenant the majority of Grey's service was in Ireland, where for a while he was aide de camp to the Lord Lieutenant of Ireland, Lord Rutland. Grey was then promoted to captain on 31 May 1787, joining the 18th Dragoons for the purpose.

When the French Revolutionary Wars began in 1793 Grey served with his father in the Flanders campaign, seeing action at the siege of Nieuwpoort. The general was then appointed Commander-in-Chief West Indies, and he brought Grey with him, being promoted to brevet major on 23 October. He served as a deputy quartermaster general. As such Grey was present at the battle of Martinique in 1794, and was afterwards sent back to Britain with the dispatches from the battle. For this service he was promoted to brevet lieutenant-colonel on 21 April. Still officially part of the 18th Dragoons, on 1 September 1795 he became a substantive major in the regiment but did not re-join it, instead continuing his staff career as an assistant quartermaster general in Britain. Grey was at some point soon after this given command of the 18th, and in September took the regiment to the West Indies as part of the expedition under Major-General Sir Ralph Abercromby.

Grey spent his service in the West Indies in garrison on Santo Domingo, during which time on 20 October 1796 he was appointed lieutenant-colonel of the 17th Dragoons. Grey returned to Britain with the 17th in April 1797. He was then promoted to brevet colonel on 1 January the following year, and at the same time appointed aide de camp to George III. Promotion to major-general followed on 1 January 1805, and he served as a staff officer in Britain until 11 July 1806 when he was appointed Commander-in-Chief, Cape of Good Hope, being made a local lieutenant-general for the purpose. During his tenure at the Cape, Grey served as acting Governor of Cape Colony in 1807 and 1811. Having been promoted to substantive lieutenant-general on 4 June of the latter year, Grey returned to Britain in November, assuming command of a military district. He continued in that post until the end of the Napoleonic Wars, leaving it on 24 June 1814. On 30 December 1811 Grey was appointed colonel of the 13th Dragoons.

== Citations ==
Military offices
| Preceded by Francis Craig | Colonel of the 13th Regiment of (Light) Dragoons; 1811–1845 | Succeeded by Hon. Edward Pyndar Lygon |
