= William Lygon, 1st Earl Beauchamp =

British politician (1747–1816)

William Lygon, 1st Earl of Beauchamp
- Born: 25 July 1747
- Died: 21 October 1816 (aged 69); St James's Square, London, England
- Other name: Lord Beauchamp of Powyke
- Occupation: politician
- Years active: 1775–1806
- Known for: re-establishing the Beauchamp earldom

William Lygon, 1st Earl of Beauchamp (/ˈlɪɡən/; 25 July 1747 – 21 October 1816), styled Lord Beauchamp of Powyke between 1806 and 1815, was an English peer and politician.

Lygon served as Member of parliament for Worcestershire from 1775 to 1806, before being elevated to the peerage as Baron Beauchamp of Powyke and later Earl Beauchamp. He played a key role in reviving the historic Beauchamp title, presided over the family estate at Madresfield Court, Worcestershire, and helped establish the political prominence of the Lygon family, which continued through his descendants.

== Early life ==
Lygon was the son of Reginald Lygon (originally Reginald Pyndar) of Madresfield Court, Worcestershire, and Susanna Hanmer, daughter of William Hanmer of Bettisfield, Flintshire. His father was the son of Reginald Pyndar and Margaret Lygon, daughter of William Lygon of Madresfield Court, a descendant of Richard Lygon of Madresfield Court, married to the Honourable Anne Beauchamp (d. 1535), second daughter and co-heiress of Richard Beauchamp, 2nd Baron Beauchamp ("of Powyk"). Reginald Pyndar took the surname Lygon by a private act of Parliament, Pyndar's Name Act 1735 (9 Geo. 2. c. 21 Pr.), upon succeeding to the Lygon estates of his maternal grandfather. He was educated at Christ Church, Oxford.

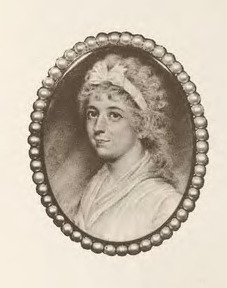
Catharine, Lady Beauchamp, portrait by John Smart

== Parliament ==
Lygon was returned to the Parliament as one of two representatives for Worcestershire in 1775, a seat he held until 1806,Rayment (March 2012). "House of Commons: Worcestershire". Leigh Rayment's Peerage Page. when he was raised to the peerage as Baron Beauchamp of Powyke, in the County of Worcester."No. 15889". The London Gazette. 11 February 1806. p. 192. He was further honoured in 1815 when he was made Viscount Elmley, in the County of Gloucester, and Earl Beauchamp.

== Marriage ==
In 1780, Lord Beauchamp married Catherine Denn, daughter of James Denn. They had several children, including two British Army generals, Henry Lygon, 4th Earl Beauchamp and Edward Pyndar Lygon. He died suddenly at St James's Square, London, on 21 October 1816, aged 69, and was succeeded in the earldom by his eldest son, William.

Parliament of the United Kingdom
Preceded by William Dowdeswell; Edward Foley	Member of Parliament for Worcestershire; 1775–1806; With: Edward Foley 1775–1803; John Ward 1803–1806	Succeeded by Hon. John Ward; Hon. William Lygon
Peerage of the United Kingdom
New creation	Earl Beauchamp; 1815–1816	Succeeded by William Beauchamp Lygon
New creation	Baron Beauchamp; 7th creation 1806–1816	Succeeded by William Beauchamp Lygon
