= William Lygon, 2nd Earl Beauchamp =

British politician (1783–1823)

William Beauchamp Lygon, 2nd Earl Beauchamp
- Born: 1783
- Died: 12 May 1823 (aged 39–40); Madresfield Court, Malvern, Worcestershire, England
- Other names: The Honourable William Lygon, Viscount Elmley
- Occupations: Politician, aristocrat, military officer
- Years active: Political life: 1806–1823 Peerage: 1816–1823
- Known for: Aristocratic leadership, political service, family legacy

William Beauchamp Lygon, 2nd Earl Beauchamp FRS (styled as The Honourable William Lygon and Viscount Elmley; 1783 – 12 May 1823) was a British, aristocratic politician, and milita officer during the Napoleonic Wars. He represented Worcestershire in the House of Commons from 1806 until 1816, when he succeeded his father as the 2nd Earl Beauchamp.

Lygon was a prominent member of the Lygon family of Madresfield Court, Worcestershire, long-established in county politics, landholding, and society. He was elected a Fellow of the Royal Society on 6 December 1810, recognising his standing among learned and scientific circles of his time.

Throughout his life, Lygon managed his family estates and maintained the social and political legacy of the Beauchamp earldom until his death in 1823.

== Early life ==
William Beauchamp Lygon was born in 1783, the eldest son of William Lygon, 1st Earl Beauchamp and Catherine Denn. The Lygons were a prominent aristocratic family with deep roots in Worcestershire, owning the family seat at Madresfield Court and holding significant influence in both local and national affairs. He received an education typical of a young man of his social standing, preparing him for public service and estate management. Lygon later matriculated at Christ Church, Oxford, one of the most prestigious colleges at the University of Oxford, where he pursued a classical curriculum. His studies encompassed the classics, philosophy, and history, equipping him for future roles in politics, estate management, and membership in learned societies such as the Royal Society.

== Military career ==
On 19 August 1803, William Beauchamp Lygon was commissioned as Lieutenant-Colonel and second-in-command of the South Worcester Volunteers., a local militia unit raised to bolster county defenses during the heightened threat from Napoleonic France. This role gave him responsibility for training, organizing, and maintaining the regiment, reflecting the social expectation that prominent local families contribute to national defense. When the regiment was reorganized as the South Worcester Local Militia, Lygon was commissioned as its Lt-Col commandant on 20 September 1809.

In addition to his militia service, Lygon pursued a regular army career. He was promoted to lieutenant in 1805, captain in 1808, and major, serving in the Peninsular War from 1812 to 1814, gaining practical combat experience. In 1815, he was promoted to major and Lieutenant colonel and commanded the 2nd Life Guards at the Battle of Waterloo, for which he was awarded the Companion of the Order of the Bath (CB).

After Waterloo, Lygon continued to rise through the ranks. He was promoted to lieutenant colonel in 1818, colonel in 1822, major general in 1837, and lieutenant-general in 1846. He was subsequently appointed Inspector General of Cavalry, overseeing cavalry training and operational readiness across the army. In January 1845, Lygon was given the colonelcy of the 13th Regiment of Light Dragoons, a position he held until his death. He was promoted to full general on 20 June 1854.

Throughout his military career, Lygon combined aristocratic responsibility with practical command experience, transitioning from local militia leadership to senior army appointments, leaving a legacy of service that reflected both his social position and professional competence.

== Parliament ==
In 1806, William Beauchamp Lygon was returned to Parliament as one of the two representatives for Worcestershire, succeeding his father, William Lygon, 1st Earl Beauchamp. During his tenure in the House of Commons, he participated in debates and legislative business typical of county representatives, focusing on issues affecting Worcestershire and the interests of the landed gentry. He held the seat until 1816, when he succeeded his father in the earldom and entered the House of Lords.

In addition to his parliamentary service, Lygon was elected a Fellow of the Royal Society on 6 December 1810, reflecting his engagement with intellectual and scientific circles of the period. His combined roles as a parliamentarian and Fellow illustrate the dual responsibilities of an early 19th-century aristocrat: managing family estates, contributing to national governance, and supporting the advancement of learning and science.

== Death ==
Lord Beauchamp died at his family seat, Madresfield Court, near Malvern, Worcestershire, on 12 May 1823, at the age of 40. He was unmarried and was succeeded in the earldom by his younger brother, John Lygon, who became the 3rd Earl Beauchamp.

His personal library was sold at auction by R. H. Evans in London beginning on 15 January 1824 and continuing for eight following days; a copy of the auction catalog is held at Cambridge University Library under the shelfmark *Munby.c.127(2)*, offering valuable insight into his collecting interests and the breadth of books assembled by an early 19th century peer.

Parliament of the United Kingdom
| Preceded by William Lygon; John Ward | Member of Parliament for Worcestershire; 1806–1816; With: John Ward March–November 1806; William Lyttelton November 1806–1816 | Succeeded by William Lyttelton; Henry Lygon |
Peerage of the United Kingdom
| Preceded by William Lygon | Earl Beauchamp; 1816–1823 | Succeeded by John Reginald Pyndar |
