= John Ward, 1st Earl of Dudley =

British politician Foreign Secretary (1781–1833)

The Right Honourable The Earl of Dudley PC FRS
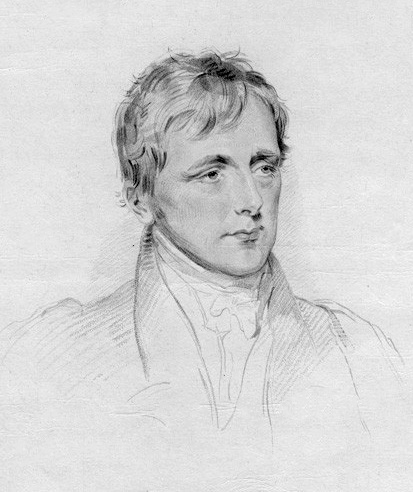

Foreign Secretary
- In office 30 April 1827 – 2 June 1828
- Monarch: George IV
- Prime Minister: George Canning; The Viscount Goderich; The Duke of Wellington
- Preceded by: George Canning
- Succeeded by: The Earl of Aberdeen

Personal details
- Born: 9 August 1781
- Died: 6 March 1833 (aged 51)
- Party: Tory
- Parent(s): William Ward, 3rd Viscount Dudley and Ward; Julia Bosville
- Education: Oriel College, Oxford; Corpus Christi College, Oxford; University of Edinburgh

John William Ward, 1st Earl of Dudley, PC, FRS (9 August 1781 – 6 March 1833), known as the Honourable John Ward from 1788 to 1823 and as the 4th Viscount Dudley and Ward from 1823 to 1827, was a British politician and slave holder. He served as Foreign Secretary from 1827 to 1828.

== Background and education ==
Dudley was the son of William Ward, 3rd Viscount Dudley and Ward, and his wife Julia Bosville, and was educated at Edinburgh University where he was a student of Professor of Moral Philosophy Dugald Stewart during the session 1797/98 and also lived with the Stewarts while he was a student, and Oxford University (starting at Oriel College in 1798 and transferring to Corpus Christi College, Oxford as a Gentleman Commoner in 1800).

== Political career ==
Dudley entered the House of Commons in 1802 as one of two representatives for Downton. He held this seat until 1803 and later represented Worcestershire from 1803 to 1806, Petersfield from 1806 to 1807, Wareham from 1807 to 1812, Ilchester from 1812 to 1819 and Bossiney from 1819 to 1823. The latter year he succeeded his father in the peerage and took his seat in the House of Lords.

In 1827 Ward was appointed Foreign Secretary under George Canning, a post he held also under Lord Goderich and the Duke of Wellington, resigning office in May 1828. In 1827 he was admitted to the Privy Council and created Viscount Ednam, of Ednam in the County of Roxburgh, and Earl of Dudley, of Dudley Castle in the County of Stafford. As foreign minister Ward was only a cipher; but he was a man of considerable learning and had some reputation as a writer and a talker. Dudley took an interest in the foundation of the University of London, and his Letters to Edward Copleston, the Bishop of Llandaff, were published by the bishop in 1840.

== Slave holder ==
Dudley was associated with three different cases, he owned 665 slaves in Jamaica and his estate was awarded a £12,728 payment at the time (worth £1.31 million in 2025).

== Personal life ==
Dudley died unmarried on 6 March 1833, aged 51. His two viscountcies and his earldom became extinct on his death while he was succeeded in his junior title of Baron Ward by his second cousin Reverend William Humble Ward.

== Industries of the estate ==
As Lord of Dudley, John Ward inherited mineral bearing lands in the Black Country region of England which included coal and limestone mines and furnaces. An agreement to construct a rail line was signed in 1827 by James Foster, a local ironmaster, and Francis Downing, the mineral agent of John William Ward. The line connected some of the coal pits owned by the Dudley estate to the Staffordshire and Worcestershire Canal. The line opened in June 1829 and was operated by the early steam locomotive Agenoria. This line was later connected to a network of private railways owned by John Ward's successors, which became known as the Earl of Dudley’s Railway.

John William Ward inherited estates in Jamaica from his grandmother Mary, Viscountess Dudley and Ward, which included enslaved people. After emancipation of the slaves in 1833, the Dudley estate received compensation for the freed slaves (the Earl having died by this time).

== Works ==
Letters from Ward to Helen D'Arcy Stewart were published as Letters to "Ivy" from the first Earl of Dudley (1905).

Parliament of the United Kingdom
Preceded by Hon. Edward Bouverie; Viscount Folkestone	Member of Parliament for Downton; 1802–1803; With: Hon. Edward Bouverie 1802–1803; Sir John Blaquiere 1803	Succeeded by Sir John Blaquiere; Viscount Marsham
Preceded by Edward Foley; William Lygon	Member of Parliament for Worcestershire; 1803–1806; With: William Lygon (I) 1803–1806; William Lygon (II) 1806	Succeeded by William Lygon; William Lyttelton
Preceded by Hylton Jolliffe; William Best	Member of Parliament for Petersfield; 1806–1807; With: Hylton Jolliffe	Succeeded by Hylton Jolliffe; Booth Grey
Preceded by Andrew Strahan; Jonathan Raine	Member of Parliament for Wareham; 1807–1812; With: Sir Granby Thomas Calcraft 1807–1808; Sir Samuel Romilly 1808–1812	Succeeded by Robert Gordon; Theodore Henry Broadhead
Preceded by Richard Brinsley Sheridan; Michael Angelo Taylor	Member of Parliament for Ilchester; 1812–1818; With: George Philips	Succeeded by Sir Isaac Coffin; John Merest
Preceded by James Stuart Wortley; Sir Compton Domvile	Member of Parliament for Bossiney; 1819–1823; With: Sir Compton Domvile	Succeeded by Sir Compton Domvile; John Stuart-Wortley-Mackenzie
Political offices
Preceded by George Canning	Foreign Secretary; 1827–1828	Succeeded by The Earl of Aberdeen
Peerage of the United Kingdom
New creation	Earl of Dudley; 1827–1833	Extinct
Peerage of Great Britain
Preceded by William Ward	Viscount Dudley and Ward; 1823–1833	Extinct
Peerage of England
Preceded by William Ward	Baron Ward; 1823–1833	Succeeded by William Humble Ward
