= Henry Winnington =

British politician

Henry Jeffreys Winnington (died 25 August 1873) was a British politician.

Winnington lived at Stanford Court in Worcestershire. He stood in the 1833 West Worcestershire by-election for the Whigs, succeeding his second cousin as MP for the constituency. In Parliament, he argued in favour of shorter Parliamentary terms. He retired at the 1841 UK general election.

Winnington's brother was the Member of Parliament for Bewdley.
