= Madresfield Court =

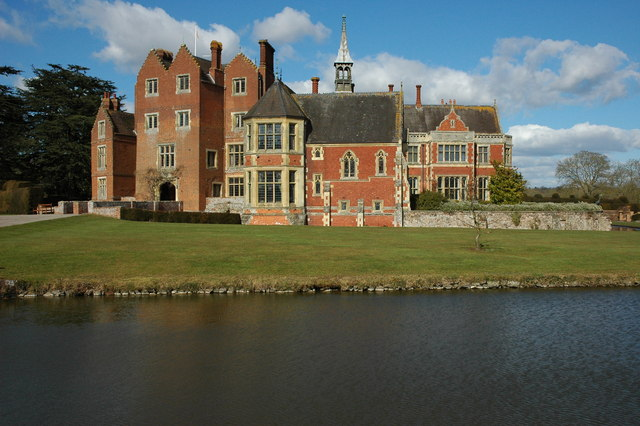
- The court across the moat

- Location within Worcestershire
- 52.1251°N 2.2808°W
- Type: Country house
- Location: Madresfield, Worcestershire
- OS grid reference: SO8087347463

History
- Built: late Medieval (original house), 1866-1888, Victorian reconstruction

Site notes
- Architect(s): Philip Charles Hardwick, for the Victorian rebuilding
- Architectural style: vernacular

Listed Building – Grade I
- Official name: Madresfield Court, including bridge, retaining wall and North service court
- Designated: 25 March 1968
- Reference no.: 1098779

Listed Building – Grade II
- Official name: Wellhead at Madrefield Court
- Designated: 9 February 1988
- Reference no.: 1166846

Listed Building – Grade II
- Official name: Stables south of Madresfield Court
- Designated: 9 February 1988
- Reference no.: 1098780

Listed Building – Grade II
- Official name: Gates and Gateway northwest of Home Farm, Madresfield Court
- Designated: 9 February 1988
- Reference no.: 1098778

Listed Building – Grade II
- Official name: Home Farmhouse and attached dairy, Madresfield Court
- Designated: 9 February 1988
- Reference no.: 1098777

Madresfield Court is a country house in Malvern, Worcestershire, England. The home of the Lygon family for nearly six centuries, it has never been sold and has passed only by inheritance since the 12th century; a line of unbroken family ownership reputedly exceeded in length in England only by homes owned by the British royal family. The present building is largely a Victorian reconstruction, although the origins of the present house are from the 16th century, and the site has been occupied since Anglo-Saxon times. The novelist Evelyn Waugh was a frequent visitor to the house and based the family of Marchmain, who are central to his novel Brideshead Revisited, on the Lygons. Surrounded by a moat, the Court is a Grade I listed building.

== History ==
=== Early history: 1086–1746 ===
The origin of the name of the court is Old English, 'maederesfeld', mower's field. Madresfield is not recorded in the Domesday Book of 1086, but is mentioned in the Westminster Cartulary of 1086 as a possession of Urse d'Abetot (or d'Abitot), Sheriff of Worcestershire. Dorothy Williams, the Lygon family historian, notes that, by 1196, the manor was held by the de Bracy family who retained it for three centuries (Note: Dorothy Williams' position as Madresfield's archivist and librarian led to her producing a somewhat circumspect family history, The Lygons of Madresfield, which contains no mention of the homosexual scandal that brought down the 7th Earl. Mrs Williams provides an explanation in the Acknowledgements to the history; "in order to avoid perpetuating hearsay it has been necessary to omit the occasional 'pretty' or 'scandalous' tale. The aim has been to include only those matters which it has been possible to verify.") until the marriage of Joan Bracy to Thomas Lygon in 1419–1420. The marriage between Thomas and the Bracy heiress established the connection between the court and the Lygon family which has continued into the 21st century. Their only son Willam was bequeathed the manor of Madresfield by Joan's mother in 1450 and the house has been the home of the Lygon family since that time. The Lygons were substantial landowners, although minor gentry, until an advantageous marriage between Richard Lygon and Anne Beauchamp, one of three daughters and heirs of Richard Beauchamp, 2nd Baron Beauchamp in the late 15th century. In 1593 Madresfield Court was rebuilt, replacing a 15th-century medieval building.

=== A less Bleak House: 1747–1865 ===
In 1806, William Lygon was made a baronet and subsequently raised to peerage as Earl Beauchamp in 1815. The family's position had been transformed by the death of a distant relative, William Jennens, in 1798. Known as "William the Miser", and "the richest commoner in England", Jennens had amassed a very large fortune through inheritance, stock dealing, property investments and money lending. His death saw his fortune split between three distant relatives, with William Lygon's share equating to some £40 million at 2012 values. The lack of a will saw the estate become subject to one of England's lengthiest court cases, Jennens and Jennens, which ran for over 100 years. The case formed the basis of the suit of Jarndyce and Jarndyce, used as the main plot device by Charles Dickens in his 1852–53 novel, Bleak House.

=== Hetton recreated: 1866–1919 ===
In 1866, the title and Madresfield passed to Frederick Lygon, his elder brother, and his father, both Henry, having died within three years of each other. (Note: The fourth earl's eldest son, William, died aged 6 in 1834.) Within the year Frederick Lygon pushed forward the major reconstruction of the court begun by his brother, a building programme that continued almost until the 6th earl's death in 1891.

=== Brideshead Revisited: 1920s–1938 ===
Madresfield was the home of the 7th Earl Beauchamp. Despite a prominent political and social career, the earl's homosexuality was a relatively open secret; Harold Nicolson recorded a dinner at Madresfield where a fellow guest asked incredulously if the earl had just whispered "Je t’adore" to the butler. "Nonsense," Nicolson replied, "he said ‘Shut the door.’" In 1931 the earl was forced abroad following a sexual scandal instigated by his brother-in-law, the Duke of Westminster, Bendor Grosvenor. (Note: The obituary of Beauchamp's last surviving child, Lady Sibell Rowley in 2005, saw the reigniting of the scandal with correspondence in The Times suggesting that Beauchamp's fall had been brought about by George V, rather than Westminster. Although George did become involved, the consensus view is that he did so at the prompting of the Duke.) Jealous of the earl's "public reputation, his splendid offices and his male heir", Westminster intrigued to bring about Beauchamp's destruction. (Note: Westminster's final communication to Beauchamp comprised a terse note; "Dear Bugger-in-Law, You got what you deserved. Yours Westminster".) Following the earl's exile, Evelyn Waugh became a close friend of three of the Beauchamp daughters and a frequent visitor to the house. Waugh had previously been close to Hugh Lygon, Beauchamp's second son, at Oxford. The central family of his novel Brideshead Revisited, the Flytes, are modelled on the Beauchamps. After their father's disgrace, most of Beauchamp's children took his, rather than their mother's side, and a marble bust of the countess was consigned to the moat. (Note: The countess's pastimes included "fastidiously correcting the titles by which she was addressed on the envelopes of the day's post".) Charles Ryder, the narrator in Brideshead Revisited noted "More even than the work of great architects, I loved buildings that grew silently with the centuries, catching and keeping the best of each generation". The historian David Dutton considered that Beauchamp's most lasting legacy was "the assumed portrayal of his family tragedy in Evelyn Waugh's novel Brideshead Revisited."

Documents released by the National Archives in January 2006 showed that emergency plans were made to evacuate Princesses Elizabeth and Margaret to Madresfield in the event of a successful German invasion following the Dunkirk evacuation in 1940. Five years later, Worcestershire County Council's Historic, Environment and Archaeology archive confirmed that the 1940 plan was part of pre-existing 1938 invasion contingency plans. In the event of an invasion breaking out of a likely lodgement in Kent and threatening London, the whole UK government would move to Worcestershire with the royal family residing at Madresfield.

=== Modern times: 1939–the present ===
After the 7th Earl's death in New York in 1938, his son Lord Elmley inherited the court. The atmosphere created by the 8th earl and his Danish wife, Mona, was uncongenial to most of the rest of the family and Mary, Dorothy, and Sibell left the house, none returning for fifty years. Before her death in 1989, Mona, Countess Beauchamp, endowed the Elmley Foundation to support the arts in the counties of Herefordshire and Worcestershire. The house was never opened to the public during her lifetime.

From 1970, Madresfield Court was the home of Rosalind, Lady Morrison, William and Mona's niece and, as of 2012, it is run and lived in by her daughter, Lucy Chenevix-Trench. In 2014, an extensive remodelling of the interior of the house was undertaken by the interior designers Todhunter Earle. Madresfield Court has never been sold or bought in its history, passing by inheritance through the Lygon family, although on three occasions this has been through the female line.

== Architecture and description ==
=== Exterior ===
"A moated house of considerable size," the existing building has its origins in the 16th century, the site having been occupied earlier. The Tudor house followed the plan of a standard moated manor. The original bridge and entrance tower are 16th century in origin, although they have been restored. A panel above the gatehouse, which has been moved from its original position, bears the names of Sir William Lygon and his wife, Elizabeth, and the date 1593. The house was extensively restored and rebuilt between 1866 and 1888 by Philip Charles Hardwick for the 5th and 6th earls, creating the current "Victorian fantasy." (Note: Hardwick is often wrongly credited with the design of the Euston Arch, which was designed by his father Philip Hardwick.) Hardwick followed his father in developing a large commercial practice, specialising in banking houses, but also undertook a considerable number of country houses, often for his City clients. Notable examples were Aldermaston Court, for D. H. D. Burr, and the now-demolished Addington Park for the then deputy governor of the Bank of England, Lord Addington. Hardwick's connection to Madresfield began with the commission for the Newlands Almshouses in Malvern. As was common for Victorian aristocrats contemplating a rebuilding of their houses, the Beauchamps began with an act of piety. The Lygons being satisfied with the result, Hardwick began a fifteen-year association with the family and the court, which the architectural writer Herminone Hobhouse describes as "characteristic of Hardwick at his best". Although "the principal lines of the old building" were followed, the work became more of a reconstruction than a restoration; only two rooms in the total of over 150 were unaltered. Work was completed c.1890. The original Great Hall, built in the 12th century, stands at the core of this building. The architectural historian Mark Girouard considers Madresfield's internal courtyard to be its most impressive feature.

=== Interior ===
An exceptionally complete piece of Arts and Crafts decoration of 1902. The furnishing was done by Birmingham craftsmen for Countess Beauchamp, as a wedding present to the seventh earl. The paintings are by A. Payne. The stained glass is by him and others. The triptych is by Charles Gere. The small crucifix and the candlesticks are by A. J. Gaskin. The ornamental glass quarries of the screen, especially pretty, are by M. Lamplough. C. R. Ashbee's guild also did woodwork." – Nikolaus Pevsner's "prosaic list" describing the Madresfield chapel. (Note: In the recording, Meades omitted such 'colour' as Pevsner did provide; details of the chapel being a "wedding present" and of the "especially pretty" character of the glass quarries were not included.)

==== The chapel ====
The chapel was decorated in the Arts and Crafts style by Birmingham Group artists including Henry Payne, William Bidlake and Charles March Gere. (Note: Another designer who worked on the library, carving the Lygon coat of arms, was Joseph Armitage who later designed the oak leaf emblem used by the National Trust for Places of Historic Interest or Natural Beauty.) The decoration was a 1902 wedding present from Lady Lettice Grosvenor to her bridegroom the 7th Earl, although work on it continued until 1923. Murals on the chapel's walls incorporate images of the couple, as well as their seven children, in scenes rife with Christian symbolism. The critic Jonathan Meades, in the BBC TV series Travels with Pevsner, contrasted the "inviting prose" used by Waugh to describe the chapel at Brideshead with the "prosaic list" written by Nikolaus Pevsner to describe Madresfield's chapel.

==== The library ====
The 7th Earl Beauchamp incorporated what had once been the billiard room into the library in order to make it larger and better accommodate its 8,000-volume collection. The Earl chose Charles Robert Ashbee and his Guild of Handicraft to decorate the new room. Ashbee created low-relief carvings of the Tree of Life and the Tree of Knowledge on the ends of two bookcases, and the Earl himself hand-embroidered the Florentine flame-stitch covers that adorn several of the library's chairs, during his years of exile abroad.

==== The staircase hall ====
Another change by the 7th Earl was the creation of a dramatic staircase hall out of three smaller rooms in the centre of the house, designed by the architect Randall Wells who had built St Edward's Church, Kempley for him in 1903. The hall rises two stories to a ceiling punctuated by three large, domed skylights. A gallery flanks two sides of the upper level, lined by a railing with balusters of rock crystal quartz. The large alabaster, porphyry and green serpentine chimneypiece was a wedding gift to Lettice, Countess Beauchamp in 1902 from her brother the 2nd Duke of Westminster. It had been first installed in the Ante-Drawing Room at the duke's house Eaton Hall from where in 1910 it was carefully dismantled by Wells, transported to Madresfield and re-erected in the Staircase Hall. (Note: Pevsner writes, "Then comes the dramatic Staircase Hall, a creation of the seventh Earl c.1913 (though the basic layout differs little from that shown in ground plans of 1898 by H. Percy Adams). Randall Wells submitted a design for a new hall c.1908, and was still involved, with Ernest Gimson, in 1912, when he was dismissed, perhaps because of the 'scandal' at Besford Court. The room, lit solely by three circular domed skylights, has a remarkable balcony on three sides, plus a staircase, of ebony woodwork: heraldic beasts on the newels, twisted balusters of crystal. Large chimneypiece of alabaster, porphyry and green serpentine, a wedding gift in 1902 from the Countess's brother, the Duke of Westminster; it could well be by Alfred Waterhouse (Eaton Hall, Cheshire).") Dozens of portraits, many of them of members of the Lygon family through the centuries, cover the walls. Around the panelling at the top of the four walls is stencilled a quote from Percy Bysshe Shelley's Adonais: "The one remains, the many change and pass; Heaven's light forever shines, Earth's shadows fly; Life, like a dome of many-colour'd glass, Stains the white radiance of eternity; Until Death tramples it to fragments."

== Garden and park ==
The Madresfield estate has its own Grade II* listing.

== Ancillary buildings and structures ==
A number of ancillary buildings and structures have separate Historic England listings. Within the precincts of the court, a late-19th century wellhead is listed Grade II. The North lodge, the South lodge, the lodge cottages near the Home Farm, and the stable block all have their own Grade II listings. At the home farm, the farmhouse itself, the farm gates and gateway, and a dovecote are similarly listed Grade II.

== Sources ==
- Beauchamp, W. L. (1929). The Madresfield Muniments: With an Account of the Family and the Estates. OCLC 866316800.
- Brooks, Alan; Pevsner, Nikolaus (2007). Worcestershire. The Buildings of England. New Haven and London: Yale University Press. ISBN 978-0-300-11298-6. OCLC 124955186.
- Byrne, Paula (2009). Mad World: Evelyn Waugh and the Secrets of Brideshead. London: Harper Press. ISBN 9780007243761. OCLC 698862740.
- Cannadine, David (1990). The Decline and Fall of the British Aristocracy. London, UK: Pan Books. ISBN 978-0-330-32188-4.
- de la Cour, John. History of Madresfield Court (PDF). Madresfield, Worcestershire: Elmley Foundation. ISBN 0-300-02390-1.
- Douglas-Home, Jamie (2006). Stately Passions: The Scandals of Britain's Great Houses. London: Michael O'Mara Books. ISBN 9781843171546. OCLC 71349200.
- Girouard, Mark (1979). The Victorian Country House. New Haven and London: Yale University Press. ISBN 0-300-02390-1.
- Green, Martin (1992). Children of the Sun: A Narrative of Decadence in England after 1918. London: Pimlico. ISBN 9780712655743. OCLC 991846551.
- Hall, Michael (2009). The Victorian Country House: From the Archives of Country Life. London: Aurum Press. ISBN 978-1-84513-457-0.
- Hobhouse, Hermione (1976). Jane Fawcett (ed.). Seven Victorian Architects. London: Thames & Hudson. ISBN 9780500340707. OCLC 490139536.
- Jenkins, Simon (2003). England's Thousand Best Houses. London: Allen Lane. ISBN 0-713-99596-3.
- Mulvagh, Jane (2008). Madresfield: One home, one family, one thousand years. London: Random House. ISBN 9780385607728.
- Peill, James (2013). The English Country House. London: Thames & Hudson. ISBN 9-780-50029307-2.
- Pevsner, Nikolaus (1968). Worcestershire. The Buildings of England. Harmondsworth, Middlesex: Penguin. OCLC 462687944.
- Tinniswood, Adrian (2016). The Long Weekend: Life in the English Country House Between The Wars. London: Jonathan Cape. ISBN 978-02240-9945-5. OCLC 951212805.
- Williams, Dorothy E. (2001). The Lygons of Madresfield Court. Woonton, Herefordshire: Logaston Press. ISBN 9781873827321. OCLC 59498257.
- Zinovieff, Sofka (2014). The Mad Boy, Lord Berners, My Grandmother and Me. London: Vintage Press. ISBN 9780099571964. OCLC 989548558.
