= Earl Beauchamp =

Extinct earldom in the Peerage of the United Kingdom

Pyndar's Name Act 1735
- Act of Parliament
- Parliament of Great Britain
- Long title: An Act to enable Reginald Lygon Esquire, otherwise Pyndar, and the Heirs Male of his Body, to take upon him and them the Surname and Arms of Lygon, pursuant to the Settlement of William Lygon Esquire, deceased.
- Citation: 9 Geo. 2. c. 21 Pr.
- Territorial extent: Great Britain

Dates
- Royal assent: 5 May 1736
- Commencement: 15 January 1736 (Note: Start of session.)

Status: Current legislation

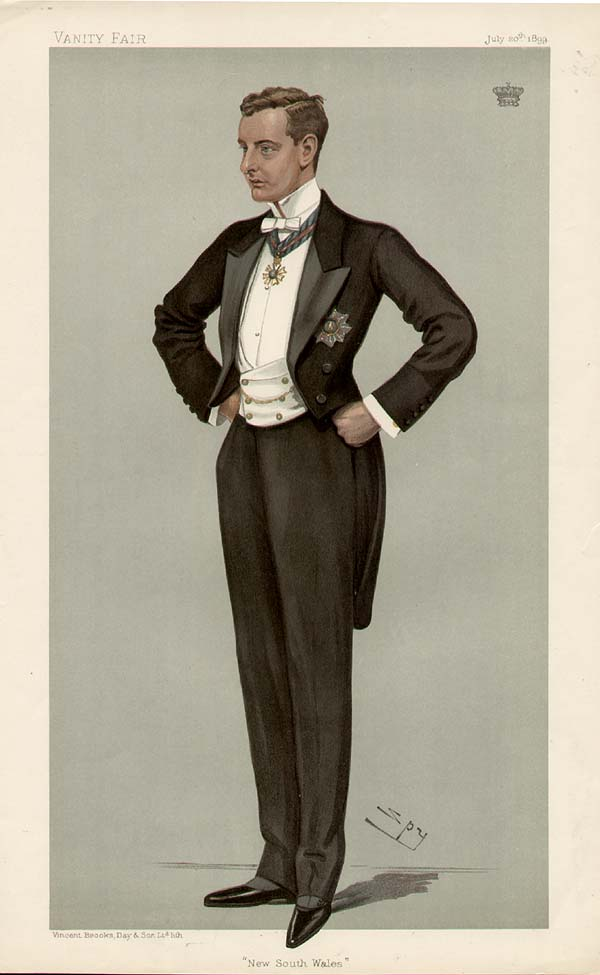
William Lygon, 7th Earl Beauchamp, as Governor of New South Wales in 1899

Earl Beauchamp (/ˈbiːtʃəm/) was a title in the Peerage of the United Kingdom.

The peerage was created in 1815 for William Lygon, 1st Baron Beauchamp, along with the subsidiary title Viscount Elmley, in the County of Worcester. He had already been created Baron Beauchamp of Powyke in the County of Worcester, in 1806, also in the Peerage of the United Kingdom. Beauchamp had previously represented Worcestershire in the House of Commons. He was succeeded by his eldest son, the second Earl, who also sat as Member of Parliament for Worcestershire. He never married and was succeeded by his younger brother, the third Earl. In 1813 he assumed by royal licence the surname of Pyndar in lieu of Lygon. On his death in 1853 the titles passed to his younger brother, the fourth Earl. He was a General in the Army as well as a Member of Parliament.

The fourth earl’s second but eldest surviving son, the fifth earl, represented Worcestershire West in Parliament. He died unmarried at an early age and was succeeded by his younger brother, the sixth Earl. He was a Conservative politician and held office in the 1870s and 1880s under Benjamin Disraeli and Lord Salisbury. His eldest son, the seventh Earl, was in contrast to his father a prominent Liberal politician and served under Sir Henry Campbell-Bannerman and H. H. Asquith. He was also Governor of New South Wales. He was succeeded by his eldest son, the eighth Earl. He was also a politician. On Lord Beauchamp's death in 1979 the titles became extinct.

The Earls Beauchamp were descended from Richard Lygon (pronounced "Liggon", /ˈlɪɡən/), of Madresfield Court, Worcestershire, who married the Hon. Anne (died 1535), second daughter and co-heir of Richard Beauchamp, 2nd Baron Beauchamp "of Powyke" (1435–1503) (see Baron Beauchamp, the fifth creation ("of Powyke")), and through the latter from the early Earls of Warwick. Their descendant, William Lygon (1642–1721), also resided at Madresfield. His daughter, Margaret (died 1734), married as her first husband Reginald Pyndar (c. 1687–1721), of Kempley, Gloucestershire. Their son Reginald Pyndar (1712–1788) changed his surname to Lygon in lieu of Pyndar, by a private act of Parliament, Reginald Pyndar's Name Act 1735 (9 Geo. 2. c. 21 Pr.). His son was the first Earl Beauchamp.

The ancestral family seat of the Lygon family was Madresfield Court, near Malvern, Worcestershire. It is currently the home of Jonathan and Lucy Chenevix-Trench, the 29th generation in descent to live at Madresfield, since 2012. Lucy Chenevix-Trench is the younger daughter of the Hon. Lady Morrison (nee Rosalind Lygon), a niece of the 8th and last Earl Beauchamp and the younger daughter of the late Hon. Richard Lygon (1916–1970), the youngest son of the 7th Earl by his wife, the former Lady Lettice Grosvenor. Rosalind Morrison inherited Madresfield Court in 1990 after the death of Mona Lygon, Countess Beauchamp, widow of the 8th and last Earl (d 1979). She took up residence around 1993 with her daughters and two surviving aunts, Lady Sibell Rowley and Lady Dorothy Heber-Percy. The house has been extensively restored by the Chenevix-Trenches and has been the subject of articles in Tatler and the Daily Mail.

== Earls Beauchamp (1815) ==
- William Lygon, 1st Earl Beauchamp (1747–1816)
- William Beauchamp Lygon, 2nd Earl Beauchamp (1782–1823)
- John Reginald Lygon, then Pyndar (1813), 3rd Earl Beauchamp (1784–1853)
- Henry Beauchamp Lygon, 4th Earl Beauchamp (1784–1863)
  - William Lygon (1828–1834)
- Henry Lygon, 5th Earl Beauchamp (1829–1866)
- Frederick Lygon, 6th Earl Beauchamp (1830–1891)
- William Lygon, 7th Earl Beauchamp (1872–1938)
- William Lygon, 8th Earl Beauchamp (1903–1979)

== Arms ==
Arms of Lygon

The arms of the head of the Lygon family are blazoned argent, two lions passant in pale tails fourchee gules, meaning that there are two red lions with forked tails on a silver field.

== See also ==
- Baron Beauchamp

== Bibliography ==
- Leigh Rayment's Peerage Pages
