= Henry Lygon, 4th Earl Beauchamp =

British Army officer and politician (1784-1863)

General The Right Honourable The Earl Beauchamp DL
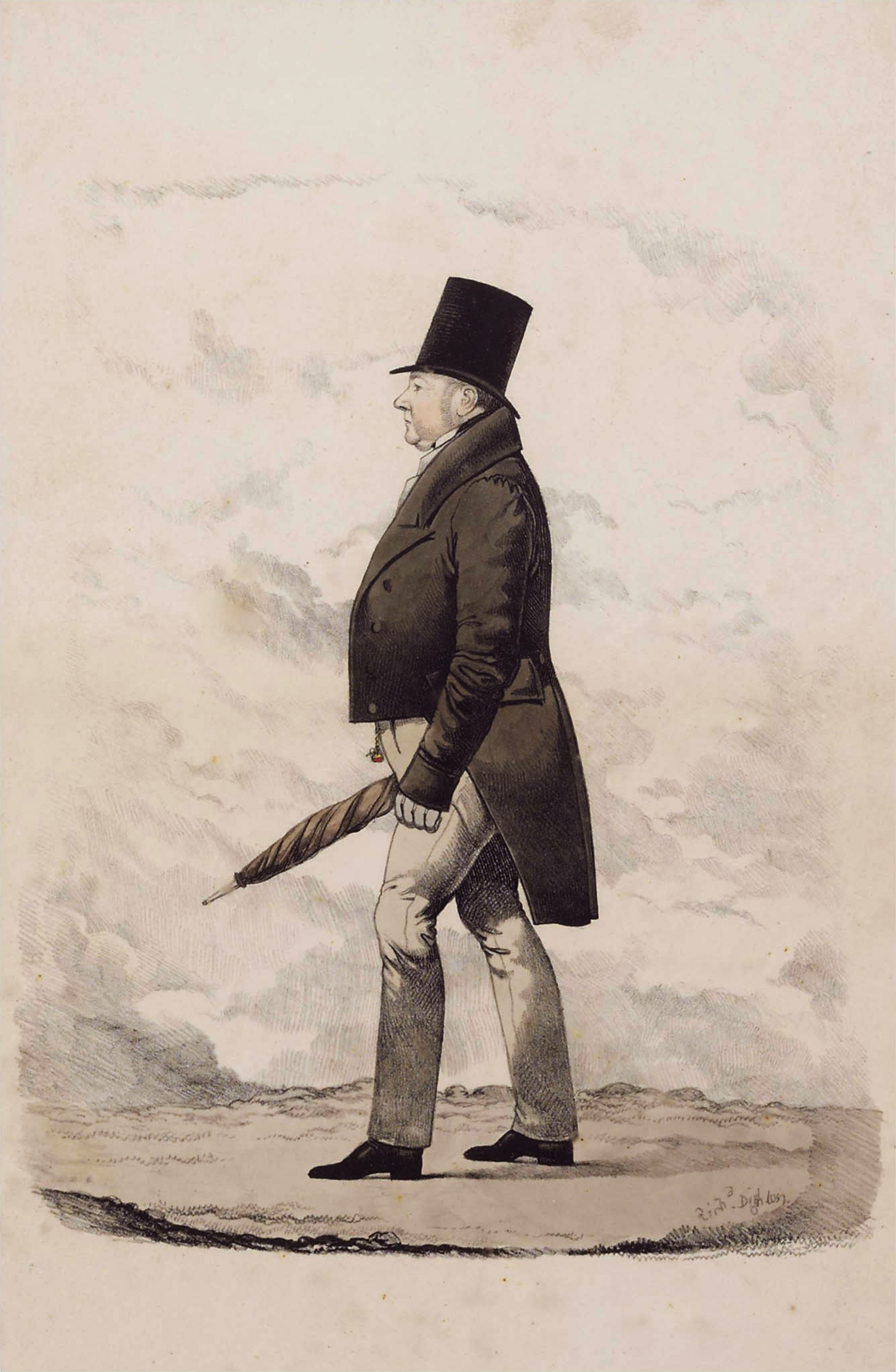
- Portrait by Richard Dighton

Member of Parliament for Worcestershire
- In office 1816–1831 Serving with Hon. William Lyttelton (1816–1820); Sir Thomas Winnington, Bt (1820–1830); Hon. Thomas Foley (1830–1831)
- Preceded by: Viscount Elmley; Hon. William Lyttelton
- Succeeded by: Hon. Thomas Foley; Hon. Frederick Spencer

Member of Parliament for West Worcestershire
- In office 1832–1853 Serving with Hon. Thomas Foley (1832–1833); Henry Jeffreys Winnington (1833–1841); Frederick Knight (1841–1853)
- Preceded by: Constituency created
- Succeeded by: Frederick Knight; Viscount Elmley

Personal details
- Born: 5 January 1784
- Died: 8 September 1863 (aged 79) Madresfield Court, Great Malvern, Worcestershire, England
- Spouse: Lady Susan Caroline Eliot (m. 1824; died 1835)
- Children: 6
- Parents: William Lygon, 1st Earl Beauchamp (father); Catharine Denn (mother)
- Relatives: Henry Lygon (son); Edward Pyndar Lygon (brother); William Lygon (brother); William Eliot (father-in-law)
- Education: Westminster School
- Alma mater: Christ Church, Oxford
- Military career
- Allegiance: Great Britain
- Branch: British Army
- Rank: General
- Units: 13th Dragoons; 16th Light Dragoons; 1st Life Guards; 10th Royal Hussars
- Conflicts: Peninsular War; First Battle of Porto; Battle of Talavera; Battle of the Côa; Battle of Bussaco
- Other work: Member of Parliament

General Henry Beauchamp Lygon, 4th Earl Beauchamp, DL (5 January 1784 – 8 September 1863), styled The Honourable Henry Lygon from 1806 until 1853, was a British Army officer and politician.

== Background ==
Beauchamp was the third son of William Lygon, 1st Earl Beauchamp, by his wife Catharine, the only daughter of James Denn. A younger brother was Edward Pyndar Lygon, who also became a General.

== Military career ==
Beauchamp was educated at Westminster School and Christ Church, Oxford and entered the British Army in 1803 as a cornet in the 13th Dragoons. Made a captain in the 16th Light Dragoons, Beauchamp served with the regiment during the Peninsular War from 1809 until its end in 1814. He took part in the First Battle of Porto and then in the Battle of Talavera. After the Battle of the Côa in 1810, he was wounded in the Battle of Bussaco. Beauchamp was promoted to major in the 1st Life Guards in 1815, to major-general in 1837 and received the colonelcy of the 10th Royal Hussars for life in 1843. Three years later he became lieutenant-general and finally general in 1853.

== Political career ==
Apart from his military career Beauchamp also entered the British House of Commons in 1816, sitting as Member of Parliament for Worcestershire until 1831. He represented the county also as a Deputy Lieutenant. Beauchamp was returned to the House for the newly established constituency Worcestershire West in 1832, holding the seat until 1853. In that year he succeeded his elder brother John in the earldom and took his seat in the House of Lords.

== Family ==
Lord Beauchamp married Lady Susan Caroline, second daughter of William Eliot, 2nd Earl of St Germans, in 1824. They had three sons and three daughters. Lady Susan died in January 1835, aged 37. Lord Beauchamp remained a widower until his death in September 1863, aged 79. He was succeeded in the earldom by his second but eldest surviving son, Henry.

Parliament of the United Kingdom
Preceded by Viscount Elmley; Hon. William Lyttelton	Member of Parliament for Worcestershire; 1816 in–1831 With: Hon. William Lyttelton 1816–1820; Sir Thomas Winnington, Bt 1820–1830; Hon. Thomas Foley 1830–1831	Succeeded by Hon. Thomas Foley; Hon. Frederick Spencer
New constituency	Member of Parliament for Worcestershire West; 1832–1853; With: Hon. Thomas Foley 1832–1833; Henry Jeffreys Winnington 1833–1841; Frederick Knight 1841–1853	Succeeded by Frederick Knight; Viscount Elmley
Military offices
Preceded by The Marquess of Londonderry	Colonel of the 10th (Prince of Wales's Own Royal) Hussars; 1843–1863	Succeeded by Edward, Prince of Wales
Preceded by The Lord Seaton	Colonel of the 2nd Regiment of Life Guards; 1863	Succeeded by The Marquess of Tweeddale
Peerage of the United Kingdom
Preceded by John Reginald Pyndar	Earl Beauchamp; 1853–1863	Succeeded by Henry Lygon
