= Alexander Glynn Campbell =

British politician (1796–1836)

Alexander Glynn Campbell (1796 – 5 November 1836) was a Member of Parliament for Fowey from 1819–1820.

Campbell was the only son of Colonel Alexander Campbell of Ardchattan, Argyllshire (1766–1844) and his wife Jane Meux Worsley of Gatcombe Park, Isle of Wight (1774–1819). He was born at Westover Lodge, Isle of Wight, on 10 August 1796. There were two other children of the marriage: Jane Elizabeth Mary Campbell (1803–1878) and Sophia Margaret Ann Campbell (1805–1827). Campbell died 5 November 1836 in Italy.
