= Henry Lygon, 5th Earl Beauchamp =

British politician

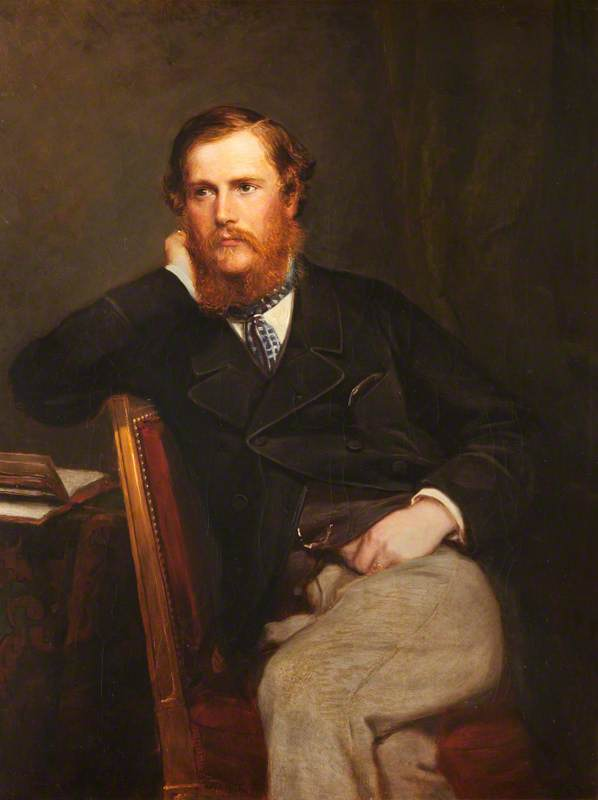
Henry Lygon, 5th Earl Beauchamp (Richard Dighton)

Henry Lygon (/ˈlɪɡən/), 5th Earl Beauchamp (13 February 1829 – 4 March 1866), styled Viscount Elmley between 1853 and 1863, was a British politician.

== Background ==
Beauchamp was the second but eldest surviving son of General Henry Lygon, 4th Earl Beauchamp, by his wife Lady Susan Caroline, daughter of William Eliot, 2nd Earl of St Germans.

== Career ==
Lygon served in the 1st Life Guards. He purchased a commission as a lieutenant on 5 May 1848, succeeding Hon. Dudley FitzGerald-deRos. That year, he became a cornet. He achieved the rank of captain in 1854. In 1853 he succeeded his father as Member of Parliament for Worcestershire West, a seat he held until 1863, when he succeeded his father in the earldom and entered the House of Lords.

== Personal life ==
Lord Beauchamp spent much of his life abroad. A homosexual, he never married. He died from tuberculosis in London in March 1866, aged 37. He was succeeded in his titles by his younger brother, Frederick.

Parliament of the United Kingdom
Preceded by Hon. Henry Beauchamp; Frederic Winn Knight	Member of Parliament for Worcestershire West; 1853–1863; With: Frederic Winn Knight	Succeeded by Frederic Winn Knight; Hon. Frederick Lygon
Peerage of the United Kingdom
Preceded by Henry Beauchamp Lygon	Earl Beauchamp; 1863–1866	Succeeded by Frederick Lygon
