= List of United Kingdom by-elections (1857–1868) =

This is a list of parliamentary by-elections in the United Kingdom held between 1857 and 1868, with the names of the previous incumbent and the victor in the by-election and their respective parties. Where seats changed political party at the election, the result is highlighted: light blue for a Conservative gain, orange for a Whig (after 1859 Liberal) gain, and grey for any other gain.

== Resignations ==
See Resignation from the British House of Commons for more details.

Where the cause of by-election is given as "resignation" or "seeks re-election", this indicates that the incumbent was appointed on his own request to an "office of profit under the Crown", either the Steward of the Chiltern Hundreds, the Steward of the Manor of Northstead or the Steward of the Manor of Hempholme. These appointments are made as a constitutional device for leaving the House of Commons, whose Members are not permitted to resign.

== By-elections ==
=== 19th Parliament (1865–1868) ===
By-election	Date	Former incumbent	Party	Winner	Party	Cause
Clitheroe	13 July 1868 (Note: An uncontested by-election.)	Richard Fort	Liberal	Ralph Assheton	Conservative	Death
Stamford	24 June 1868	Viscount Ingestre	Conservative	William Unwin Heygate	Conservative	Succession to a peerage
Dublin City	1 June 1868	Benjamin Guinness	Conservative	Arthur Guinness	Conservative	Resignation
East Worcestershire	1 June 1868	Frederick Gough-Calthorpe	Liberal	Hon. Charles Lyttelton	Liberal	Succession to a peerage
Stamford	4 May 1868	Viscount Cranborne	Conservative	Viscount Ingestre	Conservative	Succession to a peerage
East Kent	2 May 1868	Brook Bridges	Conservative	Edward Leigh Pemberton	Conservative	Elevation to the peerage
Stirling Burghs	30 April 1868	Laurence Oliphant	Liberal	John Ramsay	Liberal	Resignation
Bristol	30 April 1868	Samuel Morton Peto	Liberal	John William Miles	Conservative	Resignation
South Lincolnshire	29 April 1868	John Trollope	Conservative	William Earle Welby	Conservative	Elevation to the peerage
Radnorshire	28 April 1868	John Walsh	Conservative	Arthur Walsh	Conservative	Elevation to the peerage
Leominster	27 April 1868	Arthur Walsh	Conservative	Viscount Mahon	Conservative	Resignation to contest Radnorshire
Grantham	27 April 1868	William Earle Welby	Conservative	Edmund Turnor	Conservative	Resignation to contest South Lincolnshire
Cockermouth	27 April 1868	John Steel	Liberal	Andrew Green Thompson	Conservative	Death
Wycombe	11 April 1868	Charles Carington	Liberal	William Carington	Liberal	Succession to a peerage
Launceston	9 April 1868	Alexander Henry Campbell	Conservative	Henry Lopes	Conservative	Resignation
Coventry	26 March 1868	Henry Jackson	Liberal	Samuel Carter	Liberal	Void election
Huddersfield	20 March 1868	Thomas Crosland	Liberal	Edward Aldam Leatham	Liberal	Death
North Northamptonshire	7 March 1868	George Ward Hunt	Conservative	George Ward Hunt	Conservative	Chancellor of the Exchequer (Note: Seat vacated on appointment to the office noted.)
Argyllshire	3 March 1868	Alexander Struthers Finlay	Liberal	Marquess of Lorne	Liberal	Resignation
Cambridge University	24 February 1868	Charles Jasper Selwyn	Conservative	Alexander Beresford Hope	Conservative	Resignation (Judge of the Court of Appeal in Chancery)
Stoke-upon-Trent	20 February 1868	Alexander Beresford Hope	Conservative	George Melly	Liberal	Resignation to contest Cambridge University
Helston	19 February 1868	William Brett	Conservative	William Brett	Conservative	Solicitor General for England and Wales
Kirkcudbright	30 January 1868	James Mackie	Liberal	Wellwood Herries Maxwell	Liberal	Death
Westmorland	8 January 1868	Henry Lowther	Conservative	William Lowther	Conservative	Death
Thetford	2 December 1867	Alexander Baring	Conservative	Edward Gordon	Conservative	Resignation
South Leicestershire	30 November 1867	Charles William Packe	Conservative	Thomas Paget	Liberal	Death
Manchester	27 November 1867	Edward James	Liberal	Jacob Bright	Liberal	Death
Rutland	23 November 1867	Gilbert Heathcote	Liberal	George Finch	Conservative	Succession to a peerage
Bradford	16 October 1867	Henry Wickham Wickham	Conservative	Matthew William Thompson	Liberal	Death
County Galway	12 September 1867	Lord Dunkellin	Liberal	Viscount Burke	Liberal	Death
Dublin University	27 August 1867	Hedges Eyre Chatterton	Conservative	Robert Warren	Conservative	Resignation (Vice-Chancellor of Ireland)
Stroud	20 August 1867	George Poulett Scrope	Liberal	Henry Winterbotham	Liberal	Resignation
Downpatrick	5 August 1867	David Stewart Ker	Conservative	William Keown	Conservative	Resignation
West Gloucestershire	25 July 1867	John Rolt	Conservative	Edward Arthur Somerset	Conservative	Resignation (Lord Justice of Appeal)
Coventry	23 July 1867	Morgan Treherne	Conservative	Henry Jackson	Liberal	Death
Birmingham	23 July 1867	William Scholefield	Liberal	George Dixon	Liberal	Death
Andover	22 July 1867	John Burgess Karslake	Conservative	John Burgess Karslake	Conservative	Attorney General for England and Wales
Cambridge University	22 July 1867	Charles Jasper Selwyn	Conservative	Charles Jasper Selwyn	Conservative	Solicitor General for England and Wales
North Lancashire	1 July 1867	John Wilson-Patten	Conservative	John Wilson-Patten	Conservative	Chancellor of the Duchy of Lancaster
Weymouth and Melcombe Regis	11 June 1867	Henry Gridley	Liberal	Henry Edwards	Liberal	Resignation
Sutherland	27 May 1867	David Dundas	Liberal	Lord Ronald Gower	Liberal	Resignation
Oxford University	20 May 1867	Gathorne Hardy	Conservative	Gathorne Hardy	Conservative	Home Secretary
Middlesex	15 April 1867	Robert Culling Hanbury	Liberal	Henry Labouchère	Liberal	Death
Galway Borough	1 April 1867	Michael Morris	Conservative	George Morris	Liberal	Resignation (Puisne Judge of the Court of Common Pleas in Ireland)
Dublin University	30 March 1867	Hedges Eyre Chatterton	Conservative	Hedges Eyre Chatterton	Conservative	Attorney-General for Ireland
Huntingdonshire	25 March 1867	Lord Robert Montagu	Conservative	Lord Robert Montagu	Conservative	Vice-President of the Committee on Education
County Tyrone	21 March 1867	Henry Lowry-Corry	Conservative	Henry Lowry-Corry	Conservative	First Lord of the Admiralty
North Devon	18 March 1867	Stafford Northcote	Conservative	Stafford Northcote	Conservative	Secretary of State for India
Boston	16 March 1867	Meaburn Staniland	Liberal	Thomas Parry	Liberal	Resignation
North Shropshire	14 March 1867	Adelbert Brownlow-Cust	Conservative	Viscount Newport	Conservative	Succession to a peerage
Droitwich	13 March 1867	John Pakington	Conservative	John Pakington	Conservative	Secretary of State for War
South Shropshire	8 March 1867	Percy Egerton Herbert	Conservative	Percy Egerton Herbert	Conservative	Treasurer of the Household
North Riding of Yorkshire	4 March 1867	William Duncombe	Conservative	Octavius Duncombe	Conservative	Succession to a peerage
County Cork	23 February 1867	George Richard Barry	Liberal	Arthur Smith-Barry	Conservative	Death
East Suffolk	20 February 1867	Sir Edward Kerrison	Conservative	Frederick Snowdon Corrance	Conservative	Resignation
Colchester	15 February 1867	Taverner John Miller	Conservative	Edward Karslake	Conservative	Resignation (Chief Justice of the Common Pleas)
North Northamptonshire	13 February 1867	Lord Burghley	Conservative	Sackville Stopford	Conservative	Succession to a peerage
Galway Borough	12 February 1867	Michael Morris	Conservative	Michael Morris	Conservative	Attorney General for Ireland
Dublin University	12 February 1867	John Edward Walsh	Conservative	Hedges Eyre Chatterton	Conservative	Resignation (Master of the Rolls in Ireland)
Andover	11 February 1867	William Henry Humphery	Conservative	John Burgess Karslake	Conservative	Resignation
Armagh City	30 January 1867	Stearne Ball Miller	Conservative	John Vance	Conservative	Resignation (Judge in Bankruptcy in Ireland)
County Waterford	31 December 1866	Earl of Tyrone	Conservative	Edmond de la Poer	Liberal	Succession to a peerage
Guildford	17 December 1866	William Bovill	Conservative	Richard Garth	Conservative	Resignation (Chief Justice of the Common Pleas)
Pembrokeshire	26 November 1866	George Lort Phillips	Conservative	James Bevan Bowen	Conservative	Death
Belfast	22 November 1866	Hugh Cairns	Conservative	Charles Lanyon	Conservative	Resignation (Lord Justice of Appeal of England and Wales)
West Gloucestershire	15 November 1866	John Rolt	Conservative	John Rolt	Conservative	Attorney General for England and Wales
County Wexford	15 November 1866	John George	Conservative	Arthur MacMurrough Kavanagh	Conservative	Resignation (Judge in Bankruptcy in Ireland)
County Tipperary	22 October 1866	John Blake Dillon	Liberal	Charles William White	Liberal	Death
Penryn and Falmouth	15 October 1866	Thomas Baring	Liberal	Jervoise Smith	Liberal	Succession to a peerage
Brecon	3 October 1866	Earl of Brecknock	Liberal	Howel Gwyn	Conservative	Succession to a peerage
North Shropshire	17 August 1866	Charles Cust	Conservative	Adelbert Brownlow-Cust	Conservative	Resignation
Caernarvonshire	14 August 1866	Edward Douglas-Pennant	Conservative	George Douglas-Pennant	Conservative	Elevation to the peerage
Abingdon	6 August 1866	Charles Lindsay	Conservative	Charles Lindsay	Conservative	Groom in Waiting
Galway Borough	2 August 1866	Michael Morris	Liberal	Michael Morris	Conservative	Solicitor General for Ireland
Dublin University	30 July 1866	James Whiteside	Conservative	John Edward Walsh	Conservative	Resignation (Lord Chief Justice of Ireland)
Eye	27 July 1866	Edward Kerrison	Conservative	George Barrington	Conservative	Resignation to contest East Suffolk
East Suffolk	25 July 1866	The Lord Henniker	Conservative	John Henniker-Major	Conservative	Elevation to the peerage
East Suffolk	25 July 1866	Fitzroy Kelly	Conservative	Edward Kerrison	Conservative	Resignation (Lord Chief Baron of the Exchequer)
Peeblesshire	24 July 1866	Graham Graham-Montgomery	Conservative	Graham Graham-Montgomery	Conservative	Lord Commissioner of the Treasury
Petersfield	23 July 1866	William Jolliffe	Conservative	William Nicholson	Liberal	Elevation to the peerage
Hertfordshire	23 July 1866	Edward Bulwer-Lytton	Conservative	Abel Smith	Conservative	Elevation to the peerage
Bridgnorth	21 July 1866	Henry Whitmore	Conservative	Henry Whitmore	Conservative	Lord Commissioner of the Treasury
Tyrone	20 July 1866	Lord Claud Hamilton	Conservative	Lord Claud Hamilton	Conservative	Vice-Chamberlain of the Household
Tyrone	18 July 1866	Henry Lowry-Corry	Conservative	Henry Lowry-Corry	Conservative	Vice-President of the Committee of the Council on Education
Cambridgeshire	17 July 1866	Viscount Royston	Conservative	Viscount Royston	Conservative	Comptroller of the Household
County Antrim	17 July 1866	George Henry Seymour	Conservative	George Henry Seymour	Conservative	Third Naval Lord
North Essex	16 July 1866	Charles Du Cane	Conservative	Charles Du Cane	Conservative	Civil Lord of the Admiralty
Rutlandshire	14 July 1866	Gerard Noel	Conservative	Gerard Noel	Conservative	Lord Commissioner of the Treasury
North Northamptonshire	14 July 1866	Lord Burghley	Conservative	Lord Burghley	Conservative	Treasurer of the Household
North Leicestershire	14 July 1866	Lord John Manners	Conservative	Lord John Manners	Conservative	First Commissioner of Works
North Devon	14 July 1866	Stafford Northcote	Conservative	Stafford Northcote	Conservative	President of the Board of Trade
New Shoreham	14 July 1866	Stephen Cave	Conservative	Stephen Cave	Conservative	Paymaster General and Vice-President of the Board of Trade
Belfast	13 July 1866	Hugh Cairns	Conservative	Hugh Cairns	Conservative	Attorney General for England and Wales
Buckinghamshire	13 July 1866	Benjamin Disraeli	Conservative	Benjamin Disraeli	Conservative	Chancellor of the Exchequer
Oxford University	12 July 1866	Gathorne Hardy	Conservative	Gathorne Hardy	Conservative	President of the Poor Law Board
Stamford	12 July 1866	Viscount Cranborne	Conservative	Viscount Cranborne	Conservative	Secretary of State for India
Stamford	12 July 1866	Sir John Dalrymple-Hay	Conservative	Sir John Dalrymple-Hay	Conservative	Fourth Naval Lord
Bridgwater	12 July 1866	George Patton	Conservative	Philip Vanderbyl	Liberal	Lord Advocate
Cambridge University	11 July 1866	Spencer Horatio Walpole	Conservative	Spencer Horatio Walpole	Conservative	Home Secretary
King's Lynn	11 July 1866	Lord Stanley	Conservative	Lord Stanley	Conservative	Foreign Secretary
Huntingdon	11 July 1866	Jonathan Peel	Conservative	Jonathan Peel	Conservative	Secretary of State for War
Guildford	11 July 1866	William Bovill	Conservative	William Bovill	Conservative	Solicitor General for England and Wales
Durham	11 July 1866	John Mowbray	Conservative	John Mowbray	Conservative	Judge Advocate General
Droitwich	11 July 1866	John Pakington	Conservative	John Pakington	Conservative	First Lord of the Admiralty
Cockermouth	11 July 1866	Lord Naas	Conservative	Lord Naas	Conservative	Chief Secretary for Ireland
Hertford	30 June 1866	Walter Townshend-Farquhar	Conservative	Robert Dimsdale	Conservative	Death
South Nottinghamshire	18 June 1866	Lord Stanhope	Conservative	Thomas Thoroton-Hildyard	Conservative	Succession to a peerage
Bridgwater	7 June 1866	Henry Westropp	Conservative	George Patton	Conservative	Void election
County Waterford	7 June 1866	John Esmonde	Liberal	John Esmonde	Liberal	Lord Commissioner of the Treasury
Winchester	4 June 1866	John Bonham-Carter	Liberal	John Bonham-Carter	Liberal	Lord Commissioner of the Treasury
Devonport	22 May 1866	William Ferrand	Conservative	Lord Eliot	Liberal	Void election
Devonport	22 May 1866	John Fleming	Conservative	Montague Chambers	Liberal	Void election
County Kildare	21 May 1866	Lord Otho FitzGerald	Liberal	Lord Otho FitzGerald	Liberal	Treasurer of the Household
Aberdeenshire	15 May 1866	William Leslie	Conservative	William Dingwall Fordyce	Liberal	Resignation
Nottingham	11 May 1866	Robert Juckes Clifton	Liberal	Ralph Bernal Osborne	Liberal	Void election
Nottingham	11 May 1866	Samuel Morley	Liberal	Viscount Amberley	Liberal	Void election
Northallerton	10 May 1866	Charles Mills	Conservative	Egremont Lascelles	Conservative	Void election
North Devon	9 May 1866	Charles Trefusis	Conservative	Stafford Northcote	Conservative	Succession to a peerage
Windsor	9 May 1866	Sir Henry Hoare	Liberal	Charles Edwards	Liberal	Void election
Windsor	9 May 1866	Henry Labouchère	Liberal	Roger Eykyn	Liberal	Void election
Stamford	8 May 1866	Stafford Northcote	Conservative	Sir John Dalrymple-Hay	Conservative	Resignation to Contest North Devon
Sandwich	8 May 1866	Lord Clarence Paget	Liberal	Charles Capper	Conservative	Resignation
Reading	5 May 1866	George Shaw-Lefevre	Liberal	George Shaw-Lefevre	Liberal	Civil Lord of the Admiralty
Helston	1 May 1866 (Note: Both Robert Campbell and William Brett polled exactly the same number of votes. The mayor, as returning officer, gave his casting vote for the Liberal candidate Robert Campbell. As this vote was given after four o'clock, however, an appeal was lodged, and the House of Commons declared that the returning officer had no right to a casting vote, and that he should have returned the names of both tied candidates. On scrutiny of the votes, one vote was struck off Campbell's total, and the Conservative candidate William Brett declared duly elected.)	Adolphus William Young	Liberal	Robert Campbell	Liberal	Void election
Helston	1 May 1866	Robert Campbell	Liberal	William Brett	Conservative	By-election result reversed on petition
Cambridge	24 April 1866	William Forsyth	Conservative	John Eldon Gorst	Conservative	Void election
Ripon	28 March 1866	Lord John Hay	Liberal	Lord John Hay	Liberal	Fifth Naval Lord
Honiton	28 March 1866	Frederick Goldsmid	Liberal	Julian Goldsmid	Liberal	Death
Wigan	27 March 1866	James Alexander Lindsay	Conservative	Nathaniel Eckersley	Conservative	Resignation
Western Worcestershire	24 March 1866	Frederick Lygon	Conservative	William Edward Dowdeswell	Conservative	Succession to a peerage
County Louth	22 March 1866	Chichester Parkinson-Fortescue	Liberal	Chichester Parkinson-Fortescue	Liberal	Chief Secretary for Ireland
Tewkesbury	20 March 1866	William Edward Dowdeswell	Conservative	Sir Edmund Lechmere	Conservative	Resignation to contest Western Worcestershire
County Kerry	16 March 1866	Henry Arthur Herbert	Liberal	Henry Arthur Herbert	Liberal	Death
Richmond	6 March 1866	John Dundas	Liberal	Marmaduke Wyvill	Liberal	Death
County Limerick	1 March 1866	William Monsell	Liberal	William Monsell	Liberal	Vice-President of the Board of Trade and Paymaster General
North Lancashire	28 February 1866	Marquess of Hartington	Liberal	Marquess of Hartington	Liberal	Secretary of State for War
Tiverton	28 February 1866	The Viscount Palmerston	Liberal	George Denman	Liberal	Death
Sunderland	28 February 1866	Henry Fenwick	Liberal	John Candlish	Liberal	Civil Lord of the Admiralty
Brecon	27 February 1866	John Lloyd Vaughan Watkins	Liberal	Earl of Brecknock	Liberal	Death
Ripon	26 February 1866	Sir Charles Wood	Liberal	Lord John Hay	Liberal	Resignation pending elevation to the peerage
Leominster	26 February 1866	Gathorne Hardy	Conservative	Richard Arkwright	Conservative	Double election, chose to sit for Oxford University
City of London	26 February 1866	George Joachim Goschen	Liberal	George Joachim Goschen	Liberal	Chancellor of the Duchy of Lancaster
=== 18th Parliament (1859–1865) ===
By-election	Date	Former incumbent	Party	Winner	Party	Cause
Devonport	22 June 1865	Arthur William Buller	Liberal	Thomas Brassey	Liberal	Resignation to contest Liskeard
Liskeard	21 June 1865 (Note: An uncontested by-election.)	Ralph Bernal Osborne	Liberal	Arthur William Buller	Liberal	Resignation
Coventry	21 June 1865	Joseph Paxton	Liberal	Henry Eaton	Conservative	Death
Lambeth	9 May 1865	William Williams	Liberal	James Lawrence	Liberal	Death
Clackmannanshire and Kinross-shire	20 April 1865	William Patrick Adam	Liberal	William Patrick Adam	Liberal	Lord of the Treasury (Note: Seat vacated on appointment to the office noted.)
Wigtown Burghs	15 April 1865	William Dunbar	Liberal	George Young	Liberal	Resignation (Commissioner for Auditing the Public Accounts)
Rochdale	15 April 1865	Richard Cobden	Liberal	Thomas Bayley Potter	Liberal	Death
Louth	15 April 1865	Richard Montesquieu Bellew	Liberal	Tristram Kennedy	Liberal	Resignation (Commissioner of Poor Laws in Ireland)
South Shropshire	12 April 1865	Viscount Newport	Conservative	Percy Egerton Herbert	Conservative	Succession to a peerage
Evesham	4 April 1865	Henry Willoughby	Conservative	James Bourne	Conservative	Death
North Devon	1 April 1865	James Wentworth Buller	Liberal	Thomas Dyke Acland	Liberal	Death
North Wiltshire	20 March 1865	Thomas H. Sotheron-Estcourt	Conservative	Lord Charles Bruce	Liberal	Resignation
County Tipperary	24 February 1865	Daniel O'Donoghue	Liberal	Charles Moore	Liberal	Resignation to contest Tralee
Lancaster	20 February 1865	Samuel Gregson	Liberal	Henry Schneider	Liberal	Death
Truro	14 February 1865	Montague Edward Smith	Conservative	Frederick Williams	Conservative	Resignation (Judge of the Court of Common Pleas)
Tralee	14 February 1865	Thomas O'Hagan	Liberal	Daniel O'Donoghue	Liberal	Resignation (Judge of the Court of Common Pleas in Ireland)
Cork City	14 February 1865	Francis Lyons	Liberal	Nicholas Daniel Murphy	Liberal	Resignation
Salford	13 February 1865	William Nathaniel Massey	Liberal	John Cheetham	Liberal	Resignation (Council of India)
Buteshire	6 February 1865	David Mure	Conservative	George Boyle	Conservative	Resignation (Senator of the College of Justice)
North Warwickshire	13 December 1864	Richard Spooner	Conservative	William Bromley-Davenport	Conservative	Death
West Suffolk	8 December 1864	Earl Jermyn	Conservative	Lord Augustus Hervey	Conservative	Succession to a peerage
Carmarthen Boroughs	31 October 1864	David Morris	Liberal	William Morris	Liberal	Death
Hastings	6 October 1864	Lord Harry George Vane	Liberal	George Waldegrave-Leslie	Liberal	Succession to a peerage
Exeter	4 August 1864	Edward Divett	Liberal	Lord Courtenay	Conservative	Death
East Gloucestershire	12 July 1864	Christopher William Codrington	Conservative	Michael Hicks Beach	Conservative	Death
North Durham	28 June 1864	Lord Adolphus Vane-Tempest	Conservative	Hedworth Williamson	Liberal	Death
Gloucester	25 May 1864	John Joseph Powell	Liberal	John Joseph Powell	Liberal	Recorder of Wolverhampton
Stockport	9 May 1864	James Kershaw	Liberal	Edward Watkin	Liberal	Death
Merthyr Tydfil	25 April 1864	Henry Austin Bruce	Liberal	Henry Austin Bruce	Liberal	Vice-President of the Committee on Education
Pontefract	20 April 1864	Hugh Childers	Liberal	Hugh Childers	Liberal	Civil Lord of the Admiralty
Fife	19 April 1864	James Hay Erskine Wemyss	Liberal	Robert Anstruther	Liberal	Death
Devizes	18 April 1864	William Addington	Conservative	Thomas Bateson	Conservative	Succession to a peerage
Lancaster	13 April 1864	William James Garnett	Conservative	Edward Matthew Fenwick	Liberal	Resignation
Oxford	9 April 1864	Edward Cardwell	Liberal	Edward Cardwell	Liberal	Secretary of State for the Colonies
County Armagh	23 March 1864	Maxwell Charles Close	Conservative	James Stronge	Conservative	Resignation
Hertfordshire	14 March 1864	Christopher William Puller	Liberal	Henry Surtees	Conservative	Death
Dorset	27 February 1864	Henry Ker Seymer	Conservative	John Floyer	Conservative	Resignation
Brighton	16 February 1864	William Coningham	Liberal	Henry Moor	Conservative	Resignation
Winchester	10 February 1864	James Buller East	Conservative	Thomas Willis Fleming	Conservative	Resignation
Tewkesbury	9 February 1864	Frederick Lygon	Conservative	John Yorke	Conservative	Resignation to contest West Worcestershire.
Durham City	9 February 1864	William Atherton	Liberal	John Henderson	Liberal	Death
Buckinghamshire	29 December 1863	William George Cavendish	Liberal	Robert Bateson Harvey	Conservative	Succession to a peerage
Andover	18 November 1863	William Cubitt	Conservative	William Humphery	Conservative	Death
Oxford	7 November 1863	James Haughton Langston	Liberal	Charles Neate	Liberal	Death
Windsor	4 November 1863	George William Hope	Conservative	Richard Henry Howard Vyse	Conservative	Death
West Worcestershire	26 October 1863	Viscount Elmley	Conservative	Frederick Lygon	Conservative	Succession to a peerage
Barnstaple	20 October 1863	George Potts	Liberal	Thomas Lloyd	Liberal	Death
Barnstaple	20 October 1863	Thomas Lloyd	Liberal	Richard Bremridge	Conservative	By-election result reversed on petition
Richmond	17 October 1863	Roundell Palmer	Liberal	Roundell Palmer	Liberal	Attorney General for England and Wales
Reading	17 October 1863	Gillery Pigott	Liberal	George Shaw-Lefevre	Liberal	Resignation (Baron of the Court of the Exchequer)
Plymouth	17 October 1863	Robert Collier	Liberal	Robert Collier	Liberal	Solicitor General for England and Wales
Tamworth	12 October 1863	Viscount Raynham	Liberal	John Peel	Conservative	Succession to a peerage
Coventry	8 October 1863	Edward Ellice	Liberal	Morgan Treherne	Conservative	Death
Ludlow	28 August 1863	Beriah Botfield	Conservative	William Fraser	Conservative	Death
Montgomery Boroughs	20 August 1863	John Willes-Johnson	Conservative	Charles Hanbury-Tracy	Liberal	Death
Pontefract	3 August 1863	Richard Monckton Milnes	Liberal	Samuel Waterhouse	Conservative	Elevation to the peerage
Clare	3 August 1863	Francis Macnamara Calcutt	Liberal	Colman O'Loghlen	Liberal	Death
Berwick-upon-Tweed	29 June 1863	Charles William Gordon	Conservative	William Walter Cargill	Conservative	Death
Lisburn	26 June 1863	John Doherty Barbour	Liberal	Edward Wingfield Verner	Conservative	Void By-election
New Ross	8 June 1863	Charles Tottenham (II)	Conservative	Charles George Tottenham	Conservative	Resignation
Kinsale	8 June 1863	John Arnott	Liberal	George Conway Colthurst	Independent Liberal (Liberal-Conservative)	Resignation
City of London	2 June 1863	Western Wood	Liberal	George Joachim Goschen	Liberal	Death
Tralee	15 May 1863	Daniel O'Connell Jnr	Liberal	Thomas O'Hagan	Liberal	Resignation
County Antrim	6 May 1863	George Upton	Conservative	Edward O'Neill	Conservative	Succession to an Irish peerage
Halifax	28 April 1863	James Stansfeld	Liberal	James Stansfeld	Liberal	Civil Lord of the Admiralty
Radnor Boroughs	25 April 1863	George Cornewall Lewis	Liberal	Richard Green-Price	Liberal	Death
County Dublin	22 April 1863	James Hans Hamilton	Conservative	Ion Hamilton	Conservative	Resignation
Thetford	21 April 1863	Earl of Euston	Liberal	Lord Frederick FitzRoy	Liberal	Succession to a peerage
North Lancashire	24 March 1863	Marquess of Hartington	Liberal	Marquess of Hartington	Liberal	Civil Lord of the Admiralty
Bandon	27 February 1863	William Smyth Bernard	Conservative	Henry Boyle Bernard	Conservative	Death
Lisburn	23 February 1863	Jonathan Joseph Richardson	Conservative	John Doherty Barbour	Liberal	Resignation
Chichester	21 February 1863	Humphrey William Freeland	Liberal	John Abel Smith	Liberal	Resignation
Devizes	18 February 1863	John Neilson Gladstone	Conservative	William Addington	Conservative	Death
West Somerset	17 February 1863	Charles Moody	Conservative	William Gore-Langton	Conservative	Resignation
Cambridgeshire	14 February 1863	Edward Ball	Conservative	Lord George Manners	Conservative	Resignation
Devonport	12 February 1863	Michael Seymour	Liberal	William Ferrand	Conservative	Resignation
Cambridge	12 February 1863	Andrew Steuart	Conservative	Francis Powell	Conservative	Resignation
Reigate	6 February 1863	William John Monson	Liberal	Granville William Gresham Leveson-Gower	Liberal	Succession to a peerage
Totnes	20 January 1863	George Hay	Liberal	Alfred Seymour	Liberal	Death
East Kent	5 January 1863	William Deedes	Conservative	Edward Dering	Liberal	Death
Andover	17 December 1862	Henry Beaumont Coles	Conservative	William Cubitt	Conservative	Death
Totnes	9 December 1862	Thomas Mills	Liberal	John Pender	Liberal	Death
Southampton	6 December 1862	Brodie McGhie Willcox	Liberal	William Anderson Rose	Conservative	Death
Stoke-upon-Trent	23 September 1862	John Lewis Ricardo	Liberal	Henry Grenfell	Liberal	Death
County Carlow	7 August 1862	William McClintock-Bunbury	Conservative	Denis Pack-Beresford	Conservative	Resignation
Kirkcaldy Burghs	25 July 1862	Robert Ferguson	Liberal	Roger Sinclair Aytoun	Liberal	Resignation
Montgomeryshire	14 July 1862	Herbert Watkin Williams-Wynn	Conservative	Charles Watkin Williams-Wynn	Conservative	Death
Shrewsbury	2 June 1862	Robert Aglionby Slaney	Liberal	Henry Robertson	Liberal	Death
Kidderminster	27 May 1862	Alfred Rhodes Bristow	Liberal	Luke White	Liberal	Resignation
Oldham	5 May 1862	William Johnson Fox	Liberal	John Tomlinson Hibbert	Liberal	Resignation
Lambeth	5 May 1862	William Roupell	Liberal	Frederick Doulton	Liberal	Resignation
Preston	4 April 1862	Richard Assheton Cross	Conservative	Thomas Hesketh	Conservative	Resignation
Wycombe	18 March 1862	George Dashwood	Liberal	John Remington Mills	Liberal	Death
North Riding of Yorkshire	17 March 1862	Edward Stillingfleet Cayley	Liberal	William Morritt	Conservative	Death
County Longford	7 March 1862	Luke White	Liberal	Myles William O'Reilly	Liberal	Lord of the Treasury
Canterbury	6 March 1862	Henry Butler-Johnstone	Conservative	Henry Munro-Butler-Johnstone	Conservative	Resignation
Wakefield	28 February 1862	William Henry Leatham	Liberal	John Charles Dalrymple Hay	Conservative	Void election
Gloucester	26 February 1862	Charles James Monk	Liberal	Charles Berkeley	Liberal	Void election
Gloucester	26 February 1862	William Philip Price	Liberal	John Joseph Powell	Liberal	Void election
Leicester	17 February 1862	John Biggs	Liberal	Peter Alfred Taylor	Liberal	Resignation
Great Grimsby	14 February 1862	Lord Worsley	Liberal	John Chapman	Conservative	Succession to a peerage
Lincoln	12 February 1862	George Heneage	Liberal	John Bramley-Moore	Conservative	Resignation to contest Great Grimsby
New Shoreham	5 February 1862	Charles Burrell	Conservative	Percy Burrell	Conservative	Death
Oxfordshire	3 February 1862	George Harcourt	Liberal	John Fane	Conservative	Death
Coleraine	31 January 1862	John Boyd	Conservative	Henry Bruce	Conservative	Death
Nottingham	26 December 1861	John Mellor	Liberal	Robert Juckes Clifton	Liberal	Resignation (Justice of the Court of the King's Bench)
East Worcestershire	20 December 1861	John Hodgetts-Foley	Liberal	Harry Vernon	Liberal	Death
Finsbury	17 December 1861	Thomas Slingsby Duncombe	Liberal	William Cox	Liberal	Death
Birkenhead	11 December 1861	N/A	N/A	John Laird	Conservative	Birkenhead enfranchised
Carlisle	26 November 1861	James Graham	Liberal	Edmund Potter	Liberal	Death
Lincoln	9 November 1861	Gervaise Tottenham Waldo Sibthorp	Conservative	Charles Seely	Liberal	Death
Plymouth	31 October 1861	Viscount Valletort	Conservative	Walter Morrison	Liberal	Succession to a peerage
South Lancashire	19 August 1861	N/A	N/A	Charles Turner	Conservative	South Lancashire granted a third seat
Selkirkshire	1 August 1861	Allen Eliott-Lockhart	Conservative	Lord Henry Scott	Conservative	Resignation
Tamworth	31 July 1861	Robert Peel	Liberal	Robert Peel	Liberal	Chief Secretary for Ireland
Morpeth	31 July 1861	George Grey	Liberal	George Grey	Liberal	Home Secretary
Oxford	30 July 1861	Edward Cardwell	Liberal	Edward Cardwell	Liberal	Chancellor of the Duchy of Lancaster
City of London	29 July 1861	Lord John Russell	Liberal	Western Wood	Liberal	Resignation (elevated to the peerage)
Andover	29 July 1861	William Cubitt	Conservative	Henry Beaumont Coles	Conservative	Resignation to contest City of London
Richmond	9 July 1861	Henry Rich	Liberal	Roundell Palmer	Liberal	Resignation
Durham City	8 July 1861	William Atherton	Liberal	William Atherton	Liberal	Attorney General for England and Wales
County Longford	4 July 1861	Henry White	Liberal	Luke White	Liberal	Resignation
Wolverhampton	3 July 1861	Sir Richard Bethell	Liberal	Thomas Matthias Weguelin	Liberal	Appointed Lord Chancellor
Southwark	30 May 1861	Thomas Lloyd-Mostyn	Liberal	Lord Richard Grosvenor	Liberal	Death
Montgomery Boroughs	4 May 1861	David Pugh	Conservative	John Willes-Johnson	Conservative	Death
Banffshire	1 May 1861	Lachlan Gordon-Duff	Liberal	Robert William Duff	Liberal	Resignation
Southwark	24 April 1861	John Locke	Liberal	John Locke	Liberal	Recorder of Brighton
Tynemouth and North Shields	23 April 1861	Hugh Taylor	Conservative	Richard Hodgson	Conservative	Resignation
Marylebone	19 April 1861	Edwin James	Liberal	John Harvey Lewis	Liberal	Resignation
Tiverton	28 March 1861	The Viscount Palmerston	Liberal	The Viscount Palmerston	Liberal	Lord Warden of the Cinque Ports
Sutherland	27 March 1861	Marquess of Stafford	Liberal	David Dundas	Liberal	Succession to a peerage
County Cork	28 February 1861	Rickard Deasy	Liberal	Nicholas Leader	Conservative	Resignation (Baron of the Exchequer in Ireland)
Pembroke Boroughs	22 February 1861	Sir John Owen	Liberal	Sir Hugh Owen	Liberal	Death
South Wiltshire	14 February 1861	Sidney Herbert	Liberal	Frederick Hervey-Bathurst	Conservative	Elevation to the peerage
Aberdeenshire	13 February 1861	Lord Haddo	Liberal	Walter Barttelot	Conservative	Succession to a peerage
Bradford	11 February 1861	Titus Salt	Liberal	William Edward Forster	Liberal	Resignation
Bolton	11 February 1861	Joseph Crook	Liberal	Thomas Barnes	Liberal	Resignation
Leicester	7 February 1861	Joseph William Noble	Liberal	William Unwin Heygate	Conservative	Death
Pembrokeshire	19 January 1861	Viscount Emlyn	Conservative	George Lort Phillips	Conservative	Succession to a peerage
West Sussex	27 December 1860	Earl of March	Conservative	Walter Barttelot	Conservative	Succession to a peerage
Ripon	22 December 1860	John Ashley Warre	Liberal	Reginald Vyner	Liberal	Death
South Nottinghamshire	18 December 1860	Viscount Newark	Conservative	Lord Stanhope	Conservative	Succession to a peerage
Southwark	12 December 1860	Charles Napier	Liberal	Austen Henry Layard	Liberal	Death
Newcastle-upon-Tyne	7 December 1860	George Ridley	Liberal	Somerset Beaumont	Liberal	Resignation (Inclosure Commissioner)
Wick Burghs	1 December 1860	Samuel Laing	Liberal	Viscount Bury	Liberal	Resignation (Council of India)
Reading	21 November 1860	Francis Pigott	Liberal	Gillery Pigott	Liberal	Resignation (Lieutenant Governor of the Isle of Man)
Dartmouth	3 November 1860	John Dunn	Conservative	John Hardy	Conservative	Death
Boston	30 October 1860	Herbert Ingram	Liberal	John Malcolm	Conservative	Death
Honiton	22 October 1860	Joseph Locke	Liberal	George Moffatt	Liberal	Death
Ludlow	4 September 1860	Percy Egerton Herbert	Conservative	George Windsor-Clive	Conservative	Resignation
West Cumberland	27 August 1860	Henry Wyndham	Conservative	Percy Wyndham	Conservative	Death
Sligo Borough	9 August 1860	John Arthur Wynne	Conservative	Francis Macdonogh	Conservative	Resignation
Stafford	3 August 1860	John Ayshford Wise	Liberal	Thomas Sidney	Liberal	Resignation
County Donegal	17 July 1860	Edmund Hayes	Conservative	Viscount Hamilton	Conservative	Death
Brighton	16 July 1860	George Brooke-Pechell	Liberal	James White	Liberal	Death
Belfast	15 June 1860	Richard Davison	Conservative	Samuel Gibson Getty	Conservative	Resignation
Lymington	24 May 1860	Sir John Rivett-Carnac	Conservative	Lord George Gordon-Lennox	Conservative	Resignation
Berkshire	2 May 1860	Leicester Viney Vernon	Conservative	Richard Benyon	Conservative	Death
Harwich	24 April 1860	William Campbell	Liberal	Richard Rowley	Conservative	Succession to a peerage
Clare	13 April 1860	Luke White	Liberal	Francis Macnamara Calcutt	Liberal	Void election
Londonderry City	2 April 1860	Robert Ferguson	Liberal	William McCormick	Conservative	Death
Norwich	28 March 1860	Viscount Bury	Liberal	William Russell	Liberal	Void election
Norwich	28 March 1860	Henry William Schneider	Liberal	Edward Warner	Liberal	Void election
County Roscommon	26 March 1860	Thomas William Goff	Conservative	Charles Owen O'Conor	Liberal	Void election
Worcester	12 March 1860	William Laslett	Liberal	Richard Padmore	Liberal	Resignation
West Surrey	10 March 1860	Henry Drummond	Conservative	George Cubitt	Conservative	Death
County Cork	5 March 1860	Rickard Deasy	Liberal	Rickard Deasy	Liberal	Attorney General for Ireland
Ennis	20 February 1860	John FitzGerald	Liberal	William Stacpoole	Liberal	Resignation (Judge of the Court of the Queen's Bench in Ireland)
Hertford	13 February 1860	William Cowper	Liberal	William Cowper	Liberal	First Commissioner of Works
Gateshead	13 February 1860	William Hutt	Liberal	William Hutt	Liberal	Vice-President of the Board of Trade and Paymaster General
Forfarshire	1 February 1860	Viscount Duncan	Liberal	Charles Carnegie	Liberal	Succession to a peerage
Scarborough	1 February 1860	William Denison	Liberal	John Dent Dent	Liberal	Succession to a peerage
Pontefract	31 January 1860	William Overend	Conservative	Hugh Childers	Liberal	Resignation (arbitrator recommended resignation after contested election)
Beverly	31 January 1860	Ralph Walters	Liberal	James Walker	Conservative	Void election
Lewes	16 January 1860	Henry Fitzroy	Liberal	John Blencowe	Liberal	Death
Reading	11 January 1860	Henry Singer Keating	Liberal	Francis Goldsmid	Liberal	Resignation (Justice of the Court of Common Pleas)
Liskeard	9 January 1860	William Atherton	Liberal	William Atherton	Liberal	Solicitor General for England and Wales
Whitby	23 November 1859	Robert Stephenson	Conservative	Harry Stephen Thompson	Liberal	Death
Ayrshire	31 October 1859	Lord Patrick Crichton-Stuart	Liberal	James Fergusson	Conservative	Death
South Shropshire	14 September 1859	Robert Windsor-Clive	Conservative	Baldwin Leighton	Conservative	Death
Kingston upon Hull	20 August 1859	Joseph Hoare	Conservative	Joseph Somes	Conservative	Void election
Berwick-upon-Tweed	20 August 1859	Ralph Anstruther Earle	Conservative	Dudley Marjoribanks	Liberal	Resignation (in exchange for withdrawal of election petition)
Liskeard	18 August 1859	Ralph Grey	Liberal	Ralph Bernal Osborne	Liberal	Resignation
Hertford	18 August 1859	William Cowper	Liberal	William Cowper	Liberal	Vice-President of the Board of Trade and Paymaster General
Devonport	17 August 1859	James Wilson	Liberal	Arthur William Buller	Liberal	Resignation
Bodmin	13 August 1859	William Michell	Conservative	James Wyld	Liberal	Resignation (in exchange for withdrawal of election petition)
Taunton	9 August 1859	Henry Labouchere	Liberal	George Cavendish-Bentinck	Conservative	Resignation (Elevation to the peerage)
Devonport	9 August 1859	Thomas Erskine Perry	Liberal	Michael Seymour	Liberal	Resignation (Council of India)
Dartmouth	8 August 1859	Edward Wyndham Harrington Schenley	Liberal	John Dunn	Conservative	Void election
County Wicklow	18 July 1859	Lord Proby	Liberal	Lord Proby	Liberal	Comptroller of the Household
Wolverhampton	9 July 1859	Charles Pelham Villiers	Liberal	Charles Pelham Villiers	Liberal	President of the Poor Law Board
Ashton-under-Lyne	9 July 1859	Thomas Milner Gibson	Liberal	Thomas Milner Gibson	Liberal	President of the Board of Trade
Marylebone	7 July 1859	Benjamin Hall	Liberal	Edmond Roche	Liberal	Elevation to the peerage
West Gloucestershire	7 July 1859	Robert Kingscote	Liberal	Robert Kingscote	Liberal	Groom in Waiting
Lichfield	6 July 1859	Lord Alfred Paget	Liberal	Lord Alfred Paget	Liberal	Chief Equerry and Clerk Marshal
Northampton	5 July 1859	Robert Vernon Smith	Liberal	The Lord Henley	Liberal	Elevation to the peerage
County Kerry	5 July 1859	Viscount Castlerosse	Liberal	Viscount Castlerosse	Liberal	Vice-Chamberlain of the Household (Note: According to the writ of election the by-election cause was Castlerosse being appointed Treasurer of the Household. However according to the London Gazette he does not appear to have actually been appointed to that office but was instead appointed Vice-Chamberlain of the Household.)
County Cork	5 July 1859	Rickard Deasy	Liberal	Rickard Deasy	Liberal	Solicitor General for Ireland
Oxford University	1 July 1859	William Ewart Gladstone	Peelite	William Ewart Gladstone	Liberal	Chancellor of the Exchequer
Monmouthshire	1 July 1859	Edward Arthur Somerset	Conservative	Poulett Somerset	Conservative	Resignation
Clonmel	1 July 1859	John Bagwell	Liberal	John Bagwell	Liberal	Lord Commissioner of the Treasury
Ennis	29 June 1859	John FitzGerald	Liberal	John FitzGerald	Liberal	Attorney General for Ireland
Cork	29 June 1859	William Trant Fagan	Liberal	Francis Lyons	Liberal	Death
South Wiltshire	29 June 1859	Sidney Herbert	Liberal	Sidney Herbert	Liberal	Secretary of State for War and Secretary at War
Edinburgh	28 June 1859	James Moncreiff	Liberal	James Moncreiff	Liberal	Lord Advocate
Sandwich	28 June 1859	Edward Knatchbull-Hugessen	Liberal	Edward Knatchbull-Hugessen	Liberal	Lord Commissioner of the Treasury
Norwich	28 June 1859	Viscount Bury	Liberal	Viscount Bury	Liberal	Treasurer of the Household (Note: According to the writ of election the by-election cause was Bury being appointed Comptroller of the Household. However according to the London Gazette he does not appear to have actually been appointed to that office but was instead appointed Treasurer of the Household.)
Newcastle upon Tyne	28 June 1859	Thomas Emerson Headlam	Liberal	Thomas Emerson Headlam	Liberal	Judge Advocate General
Halifax	28 June 1859	Charles Wood	Liberal	Charles Wood	Liberal	Secretary of State for India
Bedford	28 June 1859	Samuel Whitbread	Liberal	Samuel Whitbread	Liberal	Civil Lord of the Admiralty
Wigtown Burghs	27 June 1859	William Dunbar	Liberal	William Dunbar	Liberal	Lord Commissioner of the Treasury
Radnor Boroughs	27 June 1859	George Cornewall Lewis	Liberal	George Cornewall Lewis	Liberal	Home Secretary
Wolverhampton	27 June 1859	Richard Bethell	Liberal	Richard Bethell	Liberal	Attorney General for England and Wales
Tiverton	27 June 1859	The Viscount Palmerston	Liberal	The Viscount Palmerston	Liberal	Prime Minister and First Lord of the Treasury
Reading	27 June 1859	Henry Singer Keating	Liberal	Henry Singer Keating	Liberal	Solicitor General for England and Wales
Oxford	27 June 1859	Edward Cardwell	Liberal	Edward Cardwell	Liberal	Chief Secretary for Ireland
Morpeth	27 June 1859	George Grey	Liberal	George Grey	Liberal	Chancellor of the Duchy of Lancaster
Lewes	27 June 1859	Henry Fitzroy	Liberal	Henry Fitzroy	Liberal	First Commissioner of Works
Devonport	27 June 1859	James Wilson	Liberal	James Wilson	Liberal	Vice-President of the Board of Trade and Paymaster General
Calne	27 June 1859	Robert Lowe	Liberal	Robert Lowe	Liberal	Vice-President of the Committee of the Council on Education
Ashton-under-Lyne	27 June 1859	Thomas Milner Gibson	Liberal	Thomas Milner Gibson	Liberal	President of the Poor Law Board
City of London	27 June 1859	Lord John Russell	Liberal	Lord John Russell	Liberal	Foreign Secretary
=== 17th Parliament (1857–1859) ===
By-election	Date	Former incumbent	Party	Winner	Party	Cause
Harwich	18 March 1859	John Bagshaw	Whig	Henry Jervis-White-Jervis	Conservative	Resignation
Stirlingshire	14 March 1859 (Note: An uncontested by-election.)	Peter Blackburn	Conservative	Peter Blackburn	Conservative	Junior Lord of the Treasury (Note: Seat vacated on appointment to the office noted.)
North Northumberland	10 March 1859	Lord Lovaine	Conservative	Lord Lovaine	Conservative	Vice-President of the Board of Trade and Paymaster General
West Sussex	9 March 1859	Earl of March	Conservative	Earl of March	Conservative	President of the Poor Law Board
North Wiltshire	8 March 1859	Thomas H. Sotheron-Estcourt	Conservative	Thomas H. Sotheron-Estcourt	Conservative	Home Secretary
Tewkesbury	8 March 1859	Frederick Lygon	Conservative	Frederick Lygon	Conservative	Civil Lord of the Admiralty
Bury St. Edmunds	7 March 1859	Earl Jermyn	Conservative	Lord Alfred Hervey	Conservative	Succession to a peerage
Midhurst	3 March 1859	Samuel Warren	Conservative	John Hardy	Conservative	Resignation
Marylebone	25 February 1859	Viscount Ebrington	Whig	Edwin James	Whig	Resignation and elevation to the House of Lords through a Writ of acceleration
East Worcestershire	24 February 1859	George Rushout	Conservative	Frederick Gough-Calthorpe	Whig	Succession to a peerage
West Riding of Yorkshire	21 February 1859	Viscount Goderich	Whig	John Ramsden	Whig	Succession to a peerage
Enniskillen	21 February 1859	James Whiteside	Conservative	John Lowry Cole	Conservative	Resignation in order to contest Dublin University
Greenwich	16 February 1859	John Townsend	Whig	David Salomons	Whig	Resignation
Hythe	15 February 1859	John Ramsden	Whig	Mayer Amschel de Rothschild	Whig	Resignation in order to contest the West Riding of Yorkshire
Oxford University	12 February 1859	William Ewart Gladstone	Peelite	William Ewart Gladstone	Peelite	Resignation (Lord High Commissioner of the Ionian Islands)
Galway Borough	11 February 1859	Anthony O'Flaherty	Whig	John Orrell Lever	Conservative	Void election
Dublin University	11 February 1859	George Alexander Hamilton	Conservative	James Whiteside	Conservative	Resignation
Banbury	9 February 1859	Henry William Tancred	Whig	Bernhard Samuelson	Whig	Resignation
Linlithgowshire	5 February 1859	George Dundas	Conservative	Charles Baillie	Conservative	Resignation (Lieutenant Governor of Prince Edward Island)
Boston	3 February 1859	William Henry Adams	Conservative	William Henry Adams	Conservative	Recorder of Derby
Breconshire	28 December 1858	Joseph Bailey	Conservative	Godfrey Morgan	Conservative	Death
Herefordshire	18 December 1858	Thomas William Booker-Blakemore	Conservative	Lord Montagu Graham	Conservative	Death
Manchester	17 November 1858	John Potter	Whig	Thomas Bazley	Whig	Death
Reigate	23 October 1858	Henry Rawlinson	Whig	William Monson	Whig	Resignation (Council of India)
Leominster	22 October 1858	John Willoughby	Conservative	Charles Bateman-Hanbury	Conservative	Resignation (Council of India)
Guildford	22 October 1858	Ross Donnelly Mangles	Whig	Guildford Onslow	Whig	Resignation (Council of India)
North Cheshire	7 August 1858	William Egerton	Conservative	Wilbraham Egerton	Conservative	Resignation
South Devon	6 August 1858	John Yarde-Buller	Conservative	Samuel Trehawke Kekewich	Conservative	Resignation and elevation to the peerage
Stamford	17 July 1858	John Inglis	Conservative	Stafford Northcote	Conservative	Resignation (Lord Justice Clerk)
West Cornwall	5 July 1858	Michael Williams	Whig	John St Aubyn	Whig	Death
East Norfolk	1 July 1858	Edward Buxton	Whig	Wenman Coke	Whig	Death
Hertfordshire	8 June 1858	Edward Bulwer-Lytton	Conservative	Edward Bulwer-Lytton	Conservative	Secretary of State for the Colonies
King's Lynn	5 June 1858	Lord Stanley	Conservative	Lord Stanley	Conservative	President of the Board of Control
Limerick City	21 May 1858	George Gavin	Whig	James Spaight	Conservative	Void By-Election
County Leitrim	17 May 1858	Hugh Lyons-Montgomery	Conservative	William Ormsby-Gore	Conservative	Resignation
Dublin University	27 March 1858	Joseph Napier	Conservative	Anthony Lefroy	Conservative	Resignation (Lord Chancellor of Ireland)
City Durham	17 March 1858	John Mowbray	Conservative	John Mowbray	Conservative	Judge Advocate General
County Tyrone	11 March 1858	Lord Claud Hamilton	Conservative	Lord Claud Hamilton	Conservative	Treasurer of the Household
North Northumberland	11 March 1858	Lord Lovaine	Conservative	Lord Lovaine	Conservative	Civil Lord of the Admiralty
County Dublin	11 March 1858	Thomas Edward Taylor	Conservative	Thomas Edward Taylor	Conservative	Junior Lord of the Treasury
South Shropshire	9 March 1858	Viscount Newport	Conservative	Viscount Newport	Conservative	Vice-Chamberlain of the Household
Enniskillen	9 March 1858	James Whiteside	Conservative	James Whiteside	Conservative	Attorney-General for Ireland
North Staffordshire	8 March 1858	Charles Adderley	Conservative	Charles Adderley	Conservative	Vice-President of the Committee of the Council on Education and President of the Board of Health
North Leicestershire	8 March 1858	Lord John Manners	Conservative	Lord John Manners	Conservative	First Commissioner of Works
Buckinghamshire	8 March 1858	Benjamin Disraeli	Conservative	Benjamin Disraeli	Conservative	Chancellor of the Exchequer
East Suffolk	6 March 1858	Fitzroy Kelly	Conservative	Fitzroy Kelly	Conservative	Attorney General for England and Wales
Oxfordshire	6 March 1858	Joseph Warner Henley	Conservative	Joseph Warner Henley	Conservative	President of the Board of Trade
Chichester	6 March 1858	Lord Henry Lennox	Conservative	Lord Henry Lennox	Conservative	Junior Lord of the Treasury
North Wiltshire	5 March 1858	Thomas H. Sotheron-Estcourt	Conservative	Thomas H. Sotheron-Estcourt	Conservative	President of the Poor Law Board
Belfast	5 March 1858	Hugh Cairns	Conservative	Hugh Cairns	Conservative	Solicitor General for England and Wales
King's Lynn	4 March 1858	Lord Stanley	Conservative	Lord Stanley	Conservative	Secretary of State for the Colonies
Huntingdon	4 March 1858	Jonathan Peel	Conservative	Jonathan Peel	Conservative	Secretary of State for War and Secretary at War
Cambridge University	4 March 1858	Spencer Horatio Walpole	Conservative	Spencer Horatio Walpole	Conservative	Home Secretary
Wenlock	3 March 1858	George Weld-Forester	Conservative	George Weld-Forester	Conservative	Comptroller of the Household
Stamford	3 March 1858	Sir Frederic Thesiger	Conservative	John Inglis	Conservative	Appointed Lord Chancellor
Droitwich	3 March 1858	Sir John Pakington	Conservative	Sir John Pakington	Conservative	First Lord of the Admiralty
Cockermouth	3 March 1858	Lord Naas	Conservative	Lord Naas	Conservative	Chief Secretary for Ireland
Bridgnorth	3 March 1858	Henry Whitmore	Conservative	Henry Whitmore	Conservative	Junior Lord of the Treasury
County Wicklow	25 February 1858	Viscount Milton	Whig	Lord Proby	Whig	Succession to a peerage
South Northamptonshire	20 February 1858	Viscount Althorp	Whig	Henry Cartwright	Conservative	Succession to a peerage
Limerick City	15 February 1858	James O'Brien	Whig	George Gavin	Whig	Resignation (Justice of the Court of Queen's Bench in Ireland)
Reigate	6 February 1858	William Hackblock	Independent Whig	Henry Rawlinson	Whig	Death
County Mayo	30 December 1857	George Henry Moore	Independent Irish	Lord John Browne	Whig	Void election
Buckinghamshire	28 December 1857	Charles Compton Cavendish	Whig	William George Cavendish	Whig	Resignation and elevation to the peerage
Elgin Burghs	19 December 1857	George Skene Duff	Whig	M. E. Grant Duff	Whig	Resignation
Whitehaven	17 December 1857	Robert Charles Hildyard	Conservative	George Lyall	Conservative	Death
North Northamptonshire	16 December 1857	Augustus Stafford	Conservative	George Ward Hunt	Conservative	Death
Scarborough	14 December 1857	Earl of Mulgrave	Whig	John Dent Dent	Whig	Resignation
Ashton-under-Lyne	14 December 1857	Charles Hindley	Whig	Thomas Milner Gibson	Whig	Death
Paisley	11 December 1857	Archibald Hastie	Whig	Humphrey Crum-Ewing	Whig	Death
East Kent	10 December 1857	Sir Edward Dering	Whig	William Deedes	Conservative	Resignation
Thetford	9 December 1857	Francis Baring	Conservative	Alexander Baring	Conservative	Resignation
Harwich	9 December 1857	George Drought Warburton	Independent Whig	Robert John Bagshaw	Whig	Death
Oldham	19 October 1857	James Platt	Whig	William Johnson Fox	Whig	Death
Tavistock	4 September 1857	George Henry Charles Byng	Whig	Lord Arthur Russell	Whig	Resignation to contest Middlesex
Middlesex	3 September 1857	Lord Robert Grosvenor	Whig	George Henry Charles Byng	Whig	Elevation to the peerage
Beverley	11 August 1857	Edward Auchmuty Glover	Whig	Henry Edwards	Conservative	Void election
Great Yarmouth	10 August 1857	William McCullagh Torrens	Independent Whig	Adolphus William Young	Whig	Void election
Great Yarmouth	10 August 1857	Edward Watkin	Whig	John Mellor	Whig	Void election
Birmingham	10 August 1857	George Frederic Muntz	Whig	John Bright	Whig	Death
Falkirk Burghs	8 August 1857	James Merry	Whig	John Glencairn Carter Hamilton	Whig	Void election
City of London	28 July 1857	Lionel de Rothschild	Whig	Lionel de Rothschild	Whig	Seeks re-election following the rejection of the Jewish Disabilities Bill
Woodstock	24 July 1857	Marquess of Blandford	Conservative	Lord Alfred Spencer-Churchill	Conservative	Succession to a peerage
Oxford	21 July 1857	Charles Neate	Whig	Edward Cardwell	Peelite	Void election
Banffshire	30 June 1857	The Earl Fife	Whig	Lachlan Gordon-Duff	Whig	Resignation
Carmarthenshire	12 June 1857	David Arthur Saunders Davies	Conservative	David Pugh	Conservative	Death
County Kerry	9 June 1857	Henry Arthur Herbert	Whig	Henry Arthur Herbert	Whig	Chief Secretary for Ireland
Leeds	5 June 1857	Robert Hall	Conservative	George Skirrow Beecroft	Conservative	Death
Reading	2 June 1857	Henry Singer Keating	Whig	Henry Singer Keating	Whig	Solicitor General for England and Wales
Penryn and Falmouth	27 May 1857	Thomas George Baring	Whig	Thomas George Baring	Whig	Civil Lord of the Admiralty
