= Henniker =

Henniker may refer to:

- Baron Henniker, a barony in County Wicklow, Ireland
- Henniker baronets
- John Henniker, 1st Baron Henniker (1724–1803), British Member of Parliament
- Charles Henniker-Major, 6th Baron Henniker (1872–1956)
- Henniker, New Hampshire, United States, New England town named for John Henniker
  - Henniker (CDP), New Hampshire, United States, the main village in the town of Henniker
