= Edward Kerrison =

Edward Kerrison may refer to:

- Sir Edward Kerrison, 1st Baronet (1776–1853), British Army officer and politician
- Sir Edward Kerrison, 2nd Baronet (1821–1886), British Conservative Party politician
