= Julian Clifford =

English conductor, composer and pianist (1877–1921)

Julian Seymour Clifford (London, 28 September 1877 – Hastings, 27 December 1921) was an English conductor, composer and pianist particularly associated with the orchestras at Harrogate and Hastings, which he carried to a high level of accomplishment, introducing new works by English composers and encouraging soloists of national standing to perform in the provinces.

His wife was a soprano singer. After his early death his example was followed by their son, also Julian Clifford (born 1903), who was a composer and a conductor working for Decca Records in early days, and championed works by English composers.

== Julian Clifford senior ==
Clifford (the son of Thomas Clifford of Tonbridge, Kent) was educated at Ardingly College, Tonbridge School, the Leipzig Conservatory (under Józef Śliwiński and Sir Walter Parratt) and the Royal College of Music. After terms as conductor of the Birmingham Symphony Orchestra and the Yorkshire Permanent Orchestra in Leeds, he became musical director to the Corporations of Harrogate (Yorkshire) and [Hastings] (Sussex). He frequently conducted in London, and was considered a particularly fine conductor of Pyotr Ilyich Tchaikovsky's music.

Clifford performed his own piano solo compositions, Three Episodes and Grand Valse Caprice, in a concert in Doncaster in 1899.

On 17 December 1902, he married (Alice) Margaret Mary Henniker-Major (b. 23 May 1870), daughter of the 5th Baron Henniker and 2nd Baron Hartismere (formerly MP for East Suffolk and Lieutenant Governor of the Isle of Man, who died in 1902). Margaret Clifford was an accomplished soprano singer. Their son, Julian Major Herbert Henniker Clifford, was born in 1903 and their daughter, Margaret, in 1912.

Clifford, who was considered a musical 'phenomenon', as General Entertainment Manager to the Harrogate Spa took over the Harrogate Orchestra from C.L. Naylor in 1906, with a budget of £3,500 to spend on the orchestra. He built it into a fine ensemble, attracting such artists as Fritz Kreisler, Nellie Melba, Ferruccio Busoni, Ignacy Paderewski and Anna Pavlova. The fully professional orchestra moved to Hastings for the winter seasons, an arrangement which continued until 1930. Clifford was also conductor of the Westminster Orchestral Society in 1906–07.

Clifford worked closely with his friend and colleague Ernest Farrar, a pupil of Charles Villiers Stanford's. In October 1914, at the first Yorkshire production of the 1913 William Russell film Tannhauser Clifford and Farrar arranged the accompanying music.

In 1904, the Cliffords were assisting Mrs Patrick Campbell in a concert at the Harrogate Kursaal (Royal Hall). In August 1911 the Harrogate orchestra gave the first provincial performance of Elgar's 2nd Symphony.

In July 1913, Clifford conducted Zygmunt Stojowski in a performance of his 1st Piano concerto.

The Orchestra's quality attracted other conductors, notably Ralph Vaughan Williams, who gave the second performance of his A London Symphony with them in August 1914.

In August 1915, Margaret Clifford gave one of the earliest declamations of Edward Elgar's Carillon. A month later was given the first Harrogate performance of Beethoven's Ninth Symphony, with the new Harrogate Municipal Choir led by Farrar, and conducted by Clifford, together with his own Ode to New Year.

In October 1916, Clifford conducted the Birmingham Symphony Orchestra at the Town Hall, in a programme including Friedemann's Slavonic Rhapsody and John Foulds's Keltic Suite, which were said to have been 'presented with fine precision and due observation of gradation of light and shade.'

During 1915, Gerald Finzi moved from London to Harrogate. Julian Clifford recommended to him to study composition with Ernest Farrar, who was a friend of Frank Bridge, Clive Carey and Vaughan Williams. It is stated that Finzi and Farrar had a strong mutual respect and that Farrar nurtured his talent.

Farrar died in 1918, and at a concert dedicated to his memory, at Harrogate 17 September 1919, Clifford conducted the first performance of his own work, the tone-poem 'Lights Out'.

Other compositions include a Piano Concerto in E minor, a Ballade in D for orchestra, a Suite de Concert, and the song-cycle A Dream of Flowers.

Julian Seymour Clifford died in December 1921 aged only 44 and Mrs Clifford died in July 1923. The Harrogate Orchestra then continued its daily concerts and weekly symphony concerts under Howard Carr (until 1924), and then under Basil Cameron. Julian Clifford senior, conducting at the Kursaal, appears in a silhouette of 1919 by Harry Lawrence Oakley.

== Julian Clifford junior ==
Julian Major Herbert Henniker Clifford, known as Julian Clifford, was introduced as a conductor at a Harrogate concert by his father in early 1921, aged 18, when he gave an account of Hamish MacCunn's The Land of the Mountain and the Flood which impressed a reviewer for the Musical Times, who called him 'gifted'.

Clifford succeeded his father as director of the orchestra at Hastings. In 1929 he became one of the original group of conductors, with Basil Cameron and Leslie Heward, to work on the classical recordings for the new company of Decca Records, where he undertook some important commissions. Among them were Rossini's La Boutique Fantasque in the Respighi orchestration, Delius's Sea Drift with Roy Henderson (who had excelled that year at the Delius Festival) and possibly assisted Basil Cameron in recording Rachmaninoff's 2nd Piano Concerto with pianist Vassily Sapellnikov, who had introduced the work to England in 1902.

Clifford conducted a Royal Philharmonic concert for the Society on 13 November 1930, giving Haydn's Symphony no. 88 in G, Elgar's Cello Concerto (with Antoni Sala), Rugby by Honegger and Le Poème d'Extase by Scriabin. He was also conducting for broadcast on the BBC, and in 1932 gave the first performance of E. J. Moeran's orchestral work Farrago with the BBC Orchestra (Section C) on the National Programme.

During the War there are notices of Clifford conducting at the Glasgow Alhambra Theatre, for instance in May 1941 an international ballet tour with Mona Inglesby and Harold Turner, and there in November 1943 conducting two concerts by Anne Ziegler and Webster Booth, the first with pianist Frederic Lamond and the second with Mark Hambourg, both with the National Philharmonic Orchestra. He was also connected with, if not certainly the first, conductor of William Walton's ballet The Quest at the New Theatre, London, with the Sadler's Wells Ballet under Ninette de Valois on 6 April 1943.

His connection with ballet continued after the War, and he is found at the Cambridge Theatre in Camden in October 1951 conducting a series of ballets given by the 'Grand Ballet du Marquis de Cuevas' for the impresario Peter Daubeny. He is well represented conducting Carousel at the New Theatre, Oxford, in April 1953 in a caricature pencil sketch by Gilbert Sommerlad in the collections of the Victoria and Albert Museum.
