= Thomas Robinson (Gloucester MP) =

English politician

Robinson in 1880

Sir Thomas Robinson (8 January 1827 – 26 October 1897) was an English corn merchant and Liberal politician who sat in the House of Commons between 1880 and 1895.

Robinson was born at Weston. He became a corn merchant of Gloucester and was an Alderman and mayor of the city four times. He was also a J.P.

In 1873, Robinson stood in a by-election Gloucester after out manoeuvering former Liberal member John Joseph Powell for the candidature, but was defeated. He was elected as Member of Parliament (MP) for Gloucester in 1880 after the Liberals had established a party caucus chosen by ward meetings, resulting in improved organisation. However bribery and corruption were on a major scale in Gloucester and Robinson was unseated in the same year. His willingness to stand down and the unwillingness of the Conservatives to take matters further led to suspicions of collusion between the parties and a Royal Commission was set up to examine electoral practices. The Royal Commission concluded that Gloucester was among the most corrupt of the seven towns investigated and that bribery was endemic in all elections in the city. The Commission concluded that half of the electorate had taken bribes in 1880, and blamed local politicians for most of the corruption. Notwithstanding this, and the virtual halving of the electorate eligible to vote, Robinson was reelected for Gloucester in 1885 when representation had been reduced to one member under the Redistribution of Seats Act 1885.

He was knighted in Queen Victoria's 1894 Birthday Honours.

== Personal life ==
His first cousin Elisha Smith Robinson was also a Liberal politician and Mayor of Bristol.

Robinson lived at Maisemore Park, near Gloucester. He died at the age of 70. Robinson married Harriette Goodwin in 1852.

Parliament of the United Kingdom
Preceded by Charles James Monk; William Killigrew Wait	Member of Parliament for Gloucester; 1880–1881; With: Charles James Monk	Succeeded by Charles James Monk
Preceded by Charles James Monk; William Killigrew Wait	Member of Parliament for Gloucester; 1880–1881; With: Charles James Monk	Vacant Writ suspended
Preceded by Charles James Monk	Member of Parliament for Gloucester; 1885–1895	Succeeded by Charles James Monk
Vacant Writ suspended	Member of Parliament for Gloucester; 1885–1895	Succeeded by Charles James Monk
