= 1866 East Suffolk by-election =

UK parliamentary by-election

The 1866 East Suffolk by-election was a double by-election held in the United Kingdom on 25 July 1866. The election was a Conservative seat with two Conservative MPs.

The incumbent Conservative MP John Henniker-Major became Baron Hartismere a new creation which, as it sat in the House of Lords, meant that he could no longer sit in the House of Commons. Although he had for some time had the inherited title of Baron Henniker, this was an Irish Peerage and so meant that he could sit in the House of Commons. The other incumbent Conservative MP, Fitzroy Kelly, had become Lord Chief Baron of the Exchequer, a senior judge and so had to resign his seat.

There were only two candidates, both Conservatives, and so they were elected unopposed. The candidates were John Henniker-Major's son John Henniker-Major and Edward Kerrison, who had resigned his seat in the nearby seat of Eye, thereby causing the 1866 Eye by-election which was also uncontested. Edward Kerrison was too ill to make an acceptance speech.
