= 1870 East Suffolk by-election =

UK parliamentary by-election

The 1870 East Suffolk by-election was held on 1 June 1870 after the incumbent Conservative MP John Henniker-Major was raised to the peerage as the fifth Baron Henniker. It was retained by the Conservative candidate Viscount Mahon.

This was the seventh time that the Liberal candidate, Sir Shafto Adair, had been defeated in East Suffolk, although there had earlier been some speculation that he would be returned unopposed.

East Suffolk by-election, 1870
Party	Candidate	Votes	%	±%
Conservative	Viscount Mahon	3,456	51.3	−2.0
Liberal	Sir Shafto Adair	3,285	48.7	+2.0
Majority		171	2.6	+0.5
Turnout		6,741	74.7	−0.9
Conservative hold		Swing	-2.0	
