= Charles Henniker-Major, 6th Baron Henniker =

British peer and army officer (1872–1956)

Charles Henry Chandos Henniker-Major, 6th Baron Henniker, 3rd Baron Hartismere, DL (25 January 1872 – 4 February 1956) was a British peer and British army officer.

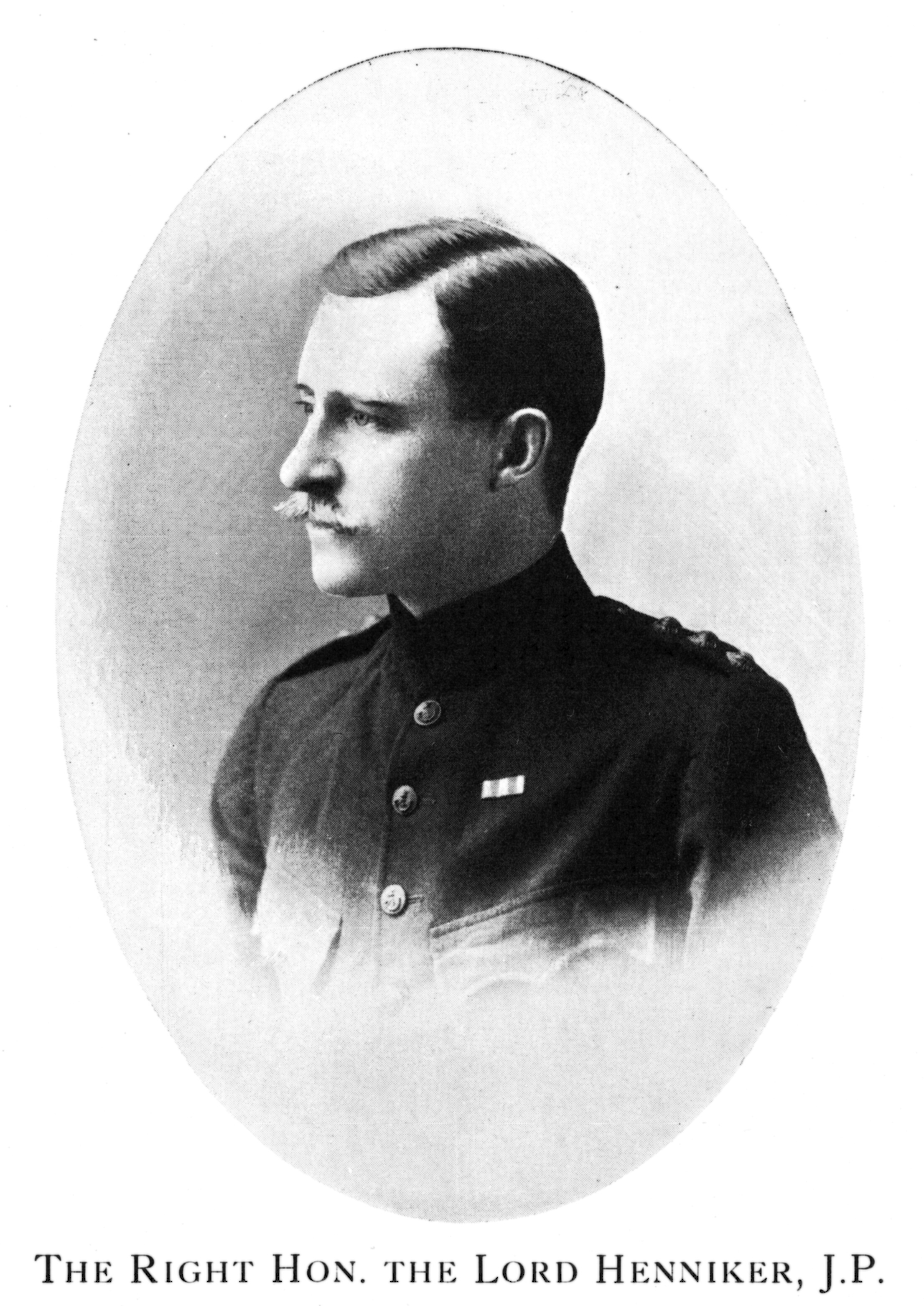
Captain Lord Henniker in 1906 or earlier

== Background and education ==
Charles Henniker-Major was the second son of John Henniker-Major, 5th Baron Henniker and his wife Lady Alice Cuffe, the only daughter of the 3rd Earl of Desart. After education at Eton and RMC Sandhurst, Henniker-Major was commissioned into the British Army in 1891. He served on the North-West Frontier of India in 1897–1898 and by 1898 was a captain in the Rifle Brigade. In 1907 he was promoted to major in the 3rd Battalion, the Rifle Brigade. He served in the First World War from 1914 to 1918. He was a lieutenant-colonel of the Rifle Brigade, commanding Rifle Depot from 1917 to 1919.

Henniker-Major held the office of Justice of the Peace (J.P.) for East Suffolk and he was also a Deputy Lieutenant (D.L.) for the same county.

The 5th Baron Henniker's eldest son died of pneumonia at age 35, and upon Lord Henniker's death in 1902 Charles Henniker-Major became the 6th Baron Henniker. He died unmarried in 1956 and was succeeded as Baron Henniker and Baron Hartismere by his brother John Ernest de Grey Henniker-Major, 7th baron.

The Thornham estate belonged to members of the Henniker-Major family since by its purchase in the 18th century by Sir John Major, 1st Baronet. In 1920 Charles Henniker-Major owned about 11,100 acres, after selling 21,000 acres in 1919 due to financial problems.

Peerage of Ireland
Preceded by John Henniker-Major	Baron Henniker; 1902–1956	Succeeded by John Ernest de Grey Henniker-Major, 7th Baron Henniker
Peerage of the United Kingdom
Preceded by John Henniker-Major	Baron Hartismere; 1902–1956	Succeeded by John Ernest de Grey Henniker-Major, 7th Baron Henniker
