= Dudley Fortescue =

British Liberal politician

The Honourable Dudley Francis Fortescue (4 August 1820 – 2 March 1909) was a British Liberal politician.

== Background ==
Fortescue was the third son of Hugh Fortescue, 2nd Earl Fortescue, and Lady Susan, daughter of Dudley Ryder, 1st Earl of Harrowby. His paternal grandmother Hester Grenville was the daughter of George Grenville. Hugh Fortescue, 3rd Earl Fortescue and the Hon. John Fortescue were his elder brothers. He was educated at the University of Oxford.

== Political career ==
Fortescue was elected Member of Parliament for Andover in 1857, a seat he held until 1874. He was also a Commissioner in Lunacy, a Deputy Lieutenant of County Waterford and Devon and served as High Sheriff of County Waterford in 1870.

== Family ==
Fortescue married his first cousin Lady Camilla Eleanor, daughter of Newton Fellowes, 4th Earl of Portsmouth and Lady Catherine Fortescue, in 1852. There were no children from the marriage. He died in March 1909, aged 88. His wife survived him by eleven years and died in August 1920.

Parliament of the United Kingdom
Preceded by Henry Beaumont Coles; William Cubitt	Member of Parliament for Andover; 1857–1874; With: William Cubitt 1857–1861, 1862–1863; Henry Beaumont Coles 1861–1862; William Humphery 1863–1867; John Burgess Karslake 1867–1868 (representation reduced to one member 1868)	Succeeded by Henry Wellesley
