= 1859 Liskeard by-election =

UK parliamentary by-election

The 1859 Liskeard by-election was an uncontested election held on 19 August 1859. The by-election was brought about due to the resignation of the incumbent Liberal MP, Ralph William Grey, who was appointed the Commissioner of Customs. It was won by the Liberal candidate Ralph Bernal Osborne, who was the only declared candidate.

== See also ==
- List of United Kingdom by-elections (1857–1868)
