= Philip Stanhope, 5th Earl Stanhope =

English antiquarian and politician

The Right Honourable The Earl Stanhope FRS
- Stanhope in 1857
- Born: Philip Henry Stanhope; 30 January 1805; Walmer, Kent, England
- Died: 24 December 1875 (aged 70); Bournemouth, Hampshire, England
- Other name: Viscount Mahon (1816–1855)
- Education: Christ Church, Oxford
- Known for: Contributions to cultural causes and for his historical writings
- Political party: Tory
- Spouse: Emily Kerrison (m. 1834; died 1873)
- Children: 5; including Arthur, Edward and Philip
- Father: Philip Henry Stanhope, 4th Earl Stanhope

Under-Secretary of State for Foreign Affairs
- In office 17 December 1834 – 8 April 1835
- Monarch: William IV
- Prime Minister: Sir Robert Peel
- Preceded by: Viscount Fordwich
- Succeeded by: William Fox-Strangways

Philip Henry Stanhope, 5th Earl Stanhope, FRS (30 January 1805 – 24 December 1875), styled Viscount Mahon between 1816 and 1855, was an English antiquarian and Tory politician. He held political office under Sir Robert Peel in the 1830s and 1840s but is best remembered for his contributions to cultural causes and for his historical writings.

== Background and education ==
Born at Walmer, Kent, Stanhope was the son of Philip Stanhope, 4th Earl Stanhope, and the Hon. Catherine Stanhope, daughter of Robert Smith, 1st Baron Carrington. He was educated at Christ Church, Oxford, graduating in 1827.

== Political career ==
Stanhope entered Parliament in 1830, representing the rotten borough of Wootton Basset in Wiltshire until the seat was disenfranchised in 1832. He was then re-elected to Parliament representing Hertford. He served under Sir Robert Peel as Under-Secretary of State for Foreign Affairs between December 1834 and April 1835, and Secretary to the Board of Control in 1845, but though he remained in the House of Commons till 1852, he made no special mark in politics.

He was elected as a member to the American Philosophical Society in 1854.

== Contributions to culture ==
Stanhope's chief achievements were in the fields of literature and antiquities. In 1842 took a prominent part in passing the Literary Copyright Act 1842. From the House of Lords he was mainly responsible for proposing and organising the foundation of the National Portrait Gallery, London in 1856. A sculpted bust of Stanhope holds the central place over the entrance of the building, flanked by fellow historians and supporters Thomas Carlyle and Lord Macaulay. It was mainly due to him that in 1869 the Historical Manuscripts Commission was started. As president of the Society of Antiquaries (from 1846 onwards), he called attention in England to the need of supporting the excavations at Troy. He was also president of the Royal Literary Fund from 1863 until his death, a trustee of the British Museum and founded the Stanhope essay prize at Oxford in 1855. He was elected a Fellow of the Royal Society in 1827.

== Writings ==
Of Lord Stanhope's own works, the most important were:

- Life of Belisarius (1829);
- History of the War of the Succession in Spain (1832), largely based on the James Stanhope, 1st Earl Stanhope's papers;
- History of England from the Peace of Utrecht to the Peace of Versailles, 1713–1783 (7 vols.) (1836–1853);
- Life of the Right Honourable William Pitt (4 vols.) (1861–1862);
- The Reign of Queen Anne until the Peace of Utrecht, 1701–1713 (1870, reprinted 1908);
- Notes of Conversation with the Duke of Wellington, 1831–1851 (1886, reprinted 1998)

A further little work was The Forty-Five a narrative of the Jacobite rising of 1745 extracted from his "History of England." A new edition of this work was published in London by John Murray, Albemarle St., in 1869, which includes some letters of Prince Charles Edward Stuart.

The two histories and the Life of William Pitt were considered of great importance on account of Stanhope's unique access to manuscript authorities on Pitt the Elder's life. His records of the Duke of Wellington's remarks during his frequent visits were also considered of great use to the historian as a substitute for Wellington's never-written memoirs. They were secretly transcribed because of Wellington's famous antagonism to the "truth" of recollected history. He also edited the letters that his distant cousin, Philip Stanhope, 4th Earl of Chesterfield, had written to his natural son, Philip. They were published between 1845 and 1853.

Stanhope's position as an historian was already established when he succeeded to the earldom in 1855, and in 1872 he was made an honorary associate of the Institute of France.

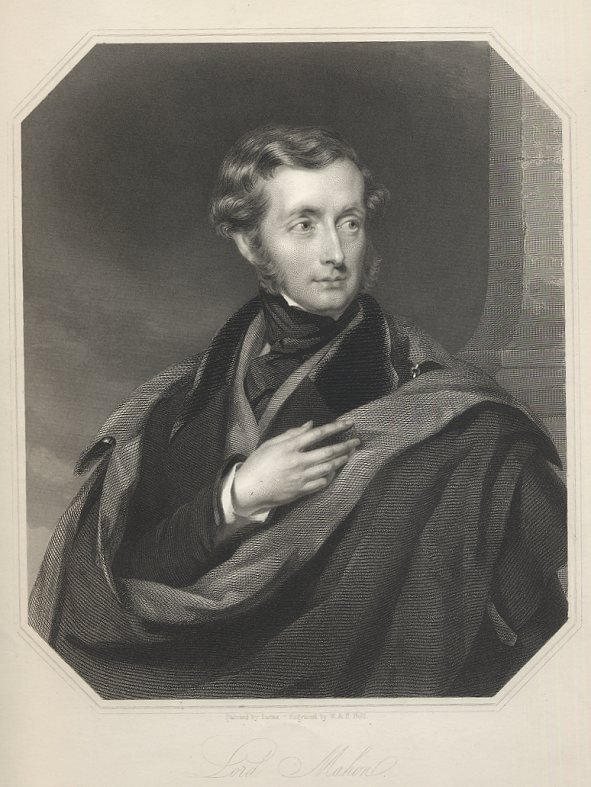
Lord Mahon, 1846

== Family ==
Lord Stanhope married Emily Harriet Kerrison, daughter of General Sir Edward Kerrison, 1st Baronet, in 1834. She died in December 1873. They had four sons and one daughter:

- Arthur Stanhope, 6th Earl Stanhope (1838–1905)
- Hon. Edward Stanhope (1840–1893), a well-known Conservative politician
- Lady Mary Catharine Stanhope (3 February 1844 – 30 June 1876), married Frederick Lygon, 6th Earl Beauchamp, and had issue
- Hon. Henry Augustus Stanhope (4 December 1845 – 17 June 1933), married Hon. Mildred Vernon (died 1915) and had issue
- Philip Stanhope, 1st Baron Weardale (1847–1923)

Stanhope survived her by two years and died at Merivale, Bournemouth, Hampshire, in December 1875, aged 70. He was succeeded in the earldom by his eldest son, Arthur.

== Notes ==
Attribution

Parliament of the United Kingdom
Preceded by Horace Twiss; Sir George Philips, Bt	Member of Parliament for Wootton Bassett; 1830–1832; With: Thomas Hyde Villiers 1830–1831; Viscount Porchester 1831–1832	Constituency abolished
Preceded by John Currie; Thomas Slingsby Duncombe	Member of Parliament for Hertford; 1832–1852; With: Viscount Ingestre 1832–1835; Hon. William Cowper 1835–1852	Succeeded by Hon. William Cowper; Thomas Chambers
Political offices
Preceded by Viscount Fordwich	Under-Secretary of State for Foreign Affairs; 1834–1835	Succeeded by Hon. William Fox-Strangways
Preceded by James Emerson Tennent; Viscount Jocelyn	Joint Secretary to the Board of Control; 1845–1846; With: Viscount Jocelyn	Succeeded by Hon. George Byng; Thomas Wyse
Peerage of Great Britain
Preceded by Philip Henry Stanhope	Earl Stanhope; 1855–1875	Succeeded by Arthur Philip Stanhope
