= Arthur Stanhope, 6th Earl Stanhope =

British Conservative Party politician (1838-1905)

The Right Honourable The Earl Stanhope
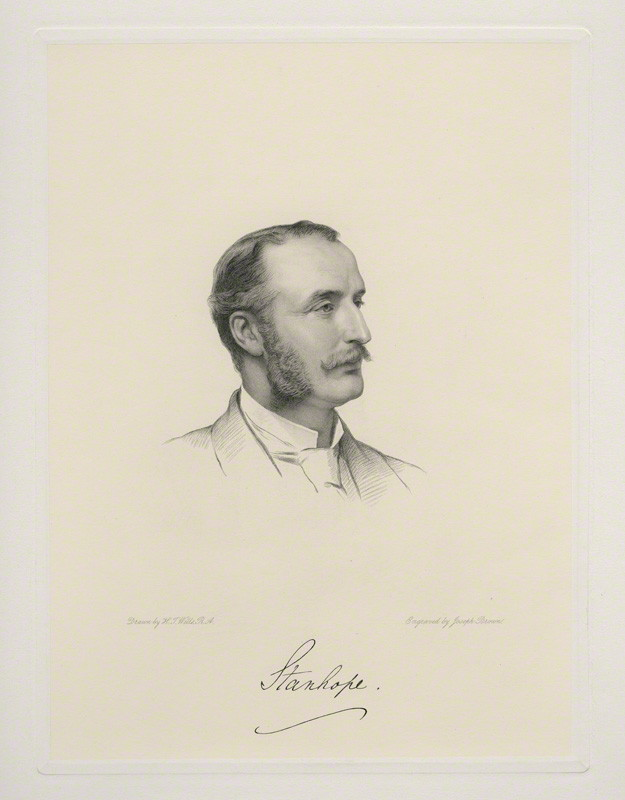
- Arthur Stanhope, 6th Earl Stanhope

Member of Parliament for Leominster
- In office 1868–1868 Serving with Richard Arkwight
- Preceded by: Arthur Walsh; Richard Arkwight
- Succeeded by: Richard Arkwight

Member of Parliament for Suffolk East
- In office 1870–1875 Serving with F. S. Corrance (1870–1874); The Lord Rendlesham (1874–75)
- Preceded by: John Henniker-Major; Frederick Snowdon Corrance
- Succeeded by: The Lord Rendlesham; Frederick St John Barne

Lord Lieutenant of Kent
- In office 1890–1895
- Preceded by: The Earl Sydney
- Succeeded by: The Marquess Camden

Personal details
- Born: Hon. Arthur Philip Stanhope; 13 September 1838 Mayfair, Westminster, England
- Died: 19 April 1905 (aged 66) Mayfair, Westminster, England
- Resting place: Chevening, Kent
- Party: Conservative
- Spouse: Evelyn Pennefather
- Children: 2
- Parents: Philip Stanhope, 5th Earl Stanhope (father); Emily Harriet Kerrison (mother)
- Relatives: James Stanhope (son); Edward Stanhope (brother); Philip Stanhope, Lord Weardale (brother); Sir Edward Kerrison (grandfather); Sir Edward Kerrison (uncle)
- Education: Harrow School

Arthur Philip Stanhope, 6th Earl Stanhope (13 September 1838 – 19 April 1905), styled Viscount Mahon from 1855–1875, was a British peer and Conservative Party politician.

== Early life and education ==
Stanhope was born at 41 Grosvenor Square, Mayfair, the eldest son of Philip Stanhope, Viscount Mahon by his wife Emily Harriet Kerrison, daughter of Gen. Sir Edward Kerrison, 1st Baronet. In 1855, upon the death of his grandfather Philip Stanhope, 4th Earl Stanhope, his father succeeded as the 5th Earl Stanhope.

He was educated at Harrow through December 1857.

== Career ==
Stanhope, when styled as Viscount Mahon, purchased a commission in the Grenadier Guards in 1858. In 1862, he purchased a captaincy. He served five years as a musketry instructor.

Stanhope sat for a few months of 1868 as a Member of Parliament for Leominster and returned to the Commons as member for Suffolk East from 1870 to 1875. He was Chairman of the National Union of Conservative and Constitutional Associations in 1875.

Lord Mahon succeeded to the title of Earl Stanhope on the death of his father on 24 December 1875 and entered the House of Lords. He was appointed First Church Estates Commissioner in December 1878, and served as Lord Lieutenant of Kent from 1890 to 1905.

== Marriage and issue ==
Stanhope married Evelyn Pennefather, daughter of Richard Pennefather of Knockeevan, County Tipperary by his wife Lady Emily Butler, daughter of Richard Butler, 1st Earl of Glengall. They had two children:

- James Richard Stanhope, 7th Earl Stanhope (1880–1967)
- Capt. Hon. Richard Philip Stanhope (16 January 1885 – 15 September 1916), married Lady Beryl le Poer Trench (d. 1957), daughter of William Trench, 5th Earl of Clancarty on 13 May 1914, without issue. He was killed at the Battle of Flers–Courcelette.

In April 1905, Stanhope underwent major surgery for cancer in London, but died the following afternoon at his Grosvenor Square home, aged 66.

Parliament of the United Kingdom
Preceded by Arthur Walsh; Richard Arkwright	Member of Parliament for Leominster; 1868; With: Richard Arkwright	Succeeded by Richard Arkwright
Preceded by John Henniker-Major; Frederick Snowdon Corrance	Member of Parliament for East Suffolk; 1870–1875; With: Frederick Snowdon Corrance 1870–1874; The Lord Rendlesham 1874–1875	Succeeded by The Lord Rendlesham; Frederick St John Barne
Party political offices
Preceded by Henry Cecil Raikes	Chairman of the National Union of Conservative and Constitutional Associations; 1875	Succeeded by Lord Claud Hamilton
Church of England titles
Preceded by The Earl of Chichester	First Church Estates Commissioner; 1878–1905	Succeeded by Sir Lewis Dibdin
Honorary titles
Preceded by The Earl Sydney	Lord Lieutenant of Kent; 1890–1905	Succeeded by The Marquess Camden
Peerage of Great Britain
Preceded by Philip Stanhope	Earl Stanhope; 1875–1905	Succeeded by James Stanhope
