= Henry Beaumont Coles =

British politician

Henry Beaumont Coles MP

Member of Parliament for Andover
- In office 29 July 1861 – 23 November 1862 Serving with Dudley Fortescue
- Preceded by: William Cubitt; Dudley Fortescue
- Succeeded by: William Cubitt; Dudley Fortescue
- In office 29 July 1847 – 28 March 1857 Serving with William Cubitt
- Preceded by: William Paget; Ralph Etwall
- Succeeded by: William Cubitt; Dudley Fortescue

Personal details
- Born: 1794
- Died: 23 November 1862 (aged 68)
- Party: Conservative

Henry Beaumont Coles (1794 – 23 November 1862) was a British Conservative politician.

Coles was first elected MP for Andover in 1847, but lost the seat in 1857. He was then elected MP for the seat again at a by-election in 1861 but died the following year.

Parliament of the United Kingdom
Preceded by William Cubitt; Dudley Fortescue	Member of Parliament for Andover; 1861 – 1862; With: Dudley Fortescue	Succeeded by William Cubitt; Dudley Fortescue
Preceded by William Paget; Ralph Etwall	Member of Parliament for Andover; 1847 – 1857; With: William Cubitt	Succeeded by William Cubitt; Dudley Fortescue
