= William Cubitt (politician) =

English engineering contractor and Conservative politician

Lord Mayor of London
- In office 1860–1862

Personal details
- Born: 1791 Buxton, Norfolk, England
- Died: 28 October 1863 (aged 72) Andover, Hampshire

William Cubitt (April 1791 – 28 October 1863) was an English building contractor and Conservative Party politician, one of the Members of Parliament for Andover from August 1847 until 1861, and again from December 1862 until his death. He was Lord Mayor of London for two years in the 1860s.

== Early life ==
The son of Jonathan Cubitt, a carpenter of Buxton, Norfolk, and his wife Agnes Scarlet, Cubitt was born there and baptized in the parish church of St Andrew's on 17 April 1791. While he was a child, his father moved the family to London, but died in December 1806 and was buried at St Clement Danes, Westminster. Cubitt joined the navy, but soon returned to settle in London, joining a carpentry and building firm established by his older brother, Thomas Cubitt, at Gray's Inn Road.

== Career ==
Cubitt became a partner in his brother's business, and about 1827 the partnership was dissolved, leaving Cubitt in sole charge. He also had a younger brother, Lewis Cubitt, who was a civil engineer and designer.

In October 1827, Cubitt was admitted to the Freedom of the City of London, as a member of the Worshipful Company of Carpenters. In October 1835, he was translated to the Fishmongers' Company.

Cubitt built Covent Garden, completed in 1830, and Fishmongers' Hall, completed in 1834. He also built the portico and the original Euston railway station, completed in 1837. He was also responsible for the reclaiming and development of Cubitt Town on the Isle of Dogs completed in 1850. He retired completely from the business in 1851. In 1883, the business was acquired by Holland & Hannen, a leading competitor, and the combined business became known as Holland & Hannen and Cubitts and subsequently as Holland, Hannen & Cubitts.

Cubitt sat as a Member of Parliament (MP) for Andover from the general election of July 1847 until 23 July 1861, when he resigned his seat by accepting appointment as Steward of the Manor of Hempholme, so that he could contest a by-election in the City of London constituency, caused by the elevation of Lord John Russell to the House of Lords as Earl Russell, which he lost narrowly. However, the death of Henry Beaumont Coles in 1862 caused a by-election at Andover which Cubitt won on 17 December 1862, and he served until his death on 28 October 1863.

Before standing for parliament, Cubitt had joined the City of London Corporation, and he continued with his career in City politics while in the House of Commons. He was Sheriff of London and Middlesex in 1847, an Alderman of the City for Langbourn from 1851 until 1863, represented the city on the Metropolitan Board of Works from 1856, and was elected as Lord Mayor of London in 1860–61; then, very unusually, he was re-elected for a second year in 1861–62. Cubitt was the last Lord Mayor to serve a second year before William Russell was re-elected in 2020.

In 1861, on the death of Sir George Carroll, Cubitt, then Lord Mayor, was appointed as President of St Bartholomew's Hospital.

Cubitt resigned as an Alderman of London on 20 January 1863, saying he could no longer attend to all his duties, due to advancing age. At an election, he was succeeded by Sydney Waterlow. A syndicated "Metropolitan Gossip" column reported on a recent list of new baronets and asked "why was Mr William Cubitt, the late Lord Mayor of London, passed over?

On 11 February 1863, Cubitt stepped into the shoes of the Prime Warden when the Prince of Wales was given the Freedom of the Fishmongers' Company and made a speech which delved deep into antiquities. In the same month, Cubitt retired as president of St Bartholomew's Hospital.

Cubitt was one of the Wardens of the Fishmongers' Company. In August 1863 he was elected as its Prime Warden, and on 7 August presided at the presentation of freedom of the Company to Prince George, Duke of Cambridge.

== Albert Memorial ==
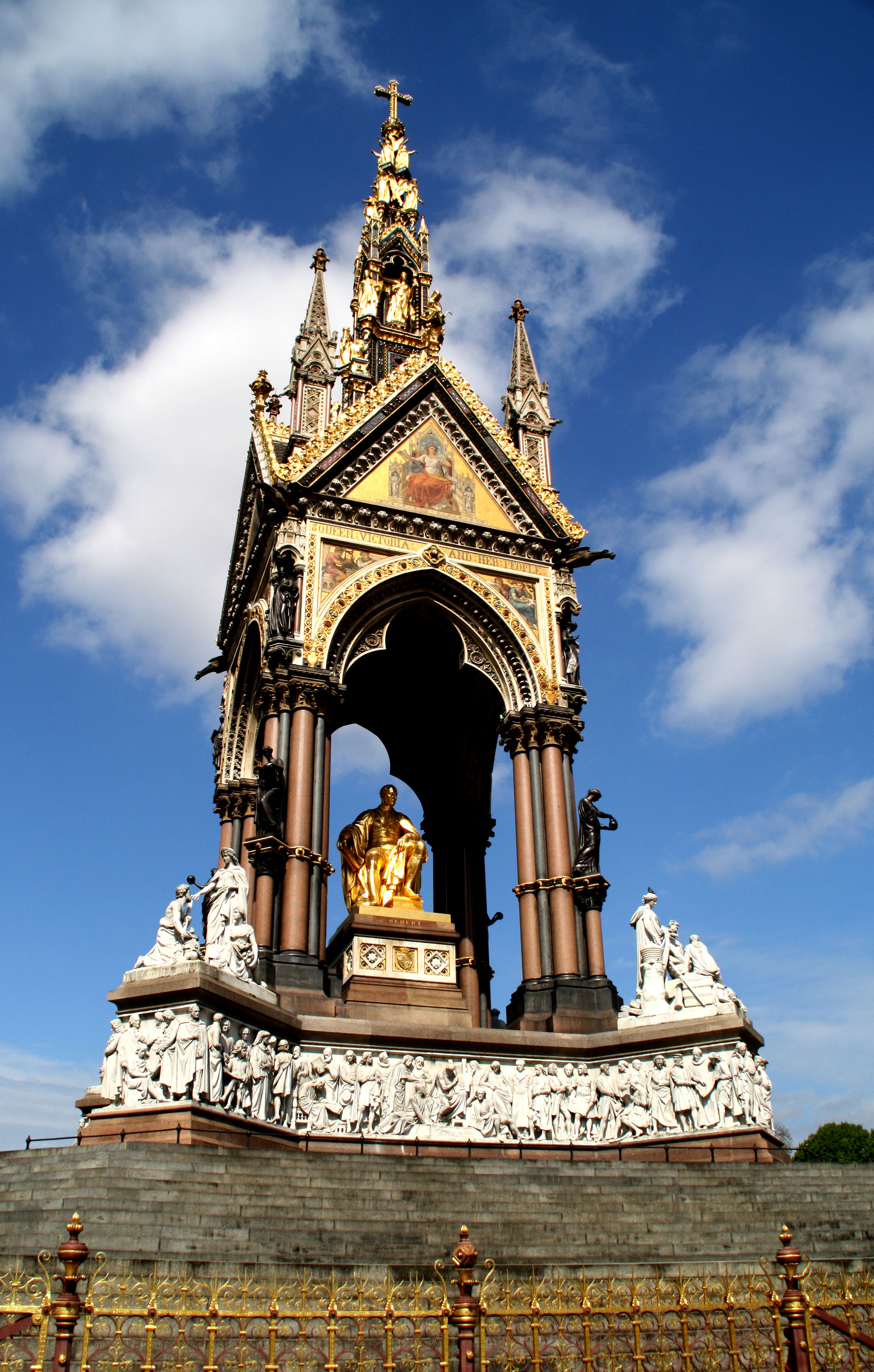
The Albert Memorial

Prince Albert, the husband of Queen Victoria, died on 14 December 1861. At a meeting on 14 January 1862, acting as Lord Mayor, Cubitt appointed a committee to raise funds for an Albert Memorial, to be approved by the Queen. Doyne Bell was secretary of the committee. Eventually, a four-man Prince Consort Memorial Committee was established, led by Charles Lock Eastlake and consisting of him, Cubitt, the 14th Earl of Derby, and the 4th Earl of Clarendon. A design by George Gilbert Scott was passed to the Queen and was approved in April 1863.

== Family ==
On 25 December 1814, at St Andrew's Church, Holborn, in the City of London, Cubitt married Elizabeth Scarlett, daughter of William Quintin Scarlett and his wife Christiana Shergold; William Quintin Scarlett was also a native of Norfolk, and had been baptized at Calthorpe, a few miles from Buxton, in 1757.

Cubitt and his wife had one son and four daughters who survived infancy. Laura (born 1823) married Sir Joseph Francis Olliffe MD; Maria (born 1827) married William Henry Humphery, later created a Baronet, who succeeded his father-in-law as member of parliament for Andover; and Emma (born 1826) married John Humphery, an elder brother of William. Both were sons of John Humphery, a Lord Mayor of London. Two daughters died in infancy, Mary (born and died 1815) and Marianne (born 1821). Other daughters were a second Mary (born 1817), Eliza (born 1818) and Rosa (born 1825).

The Cubitts' only son, Thomas (born 1819), was educated at Westminster School and admitted to St John's College, Cambridge, in October 1838. He migrated to Trinity College, Cambridge, in January 1839, and was elected a scholar in 1841. He died unmarried at Cambridge on 4 November 1841.

At the time of the census of 30 March 1851, Cubitt and his wife were living in Bedford Hill, Streatham with their daughters Eliza and Rosa and nine servants, including a butler. Mrs Cubitt gave her birthplace as London, Middlesex, and Cubitt's age was stated as 59. At the census of 7 April 1861, Cubitt, a widower aged 69, was living at Mansion House as Lord Mayor, with his daughter Rosa and four Olliffe grandchildren, all born in Paris. He had it noted that he had no business or profession.

Elizabeth Cubitt died in St George Hanover Square early in 1863, to be followed by Cubitt on 28 October, dying at Penton Lodge, near Andover, Hampshire, aged 72. In its obituary, the Illustrated London News reported that he had been born in 1791. He was buried in the churchyard of Holy Trinity Church, Penton Mewsey, Hampshire.

Parliament of the United Kingdom
Preceded by Ralph Etwall; Lord William Paget	Member of Parliament for Andover; 1847–1861; With: Henry Beaumont Coles 1847–1857; Hon. Dudley Fortescue 1857–1861	Succeeded by Hon. Dudley Fortescue; Henry Beaumont Coles
Preceded by Hon. Dudley Fortescue; Henry Beaumont Coles	Member of Parliament for Andover; 1862–1863; With: Hon. Dudley Fortescue	Succeeded by Hon. Dudley Fortescue; William Humphery
Political offices
Preceded by John Carter	Lord Mayor of London; 1860–1862	Succeeded by William Rose
