= Sir John Major, 1st Baronet =

British merchant and MP

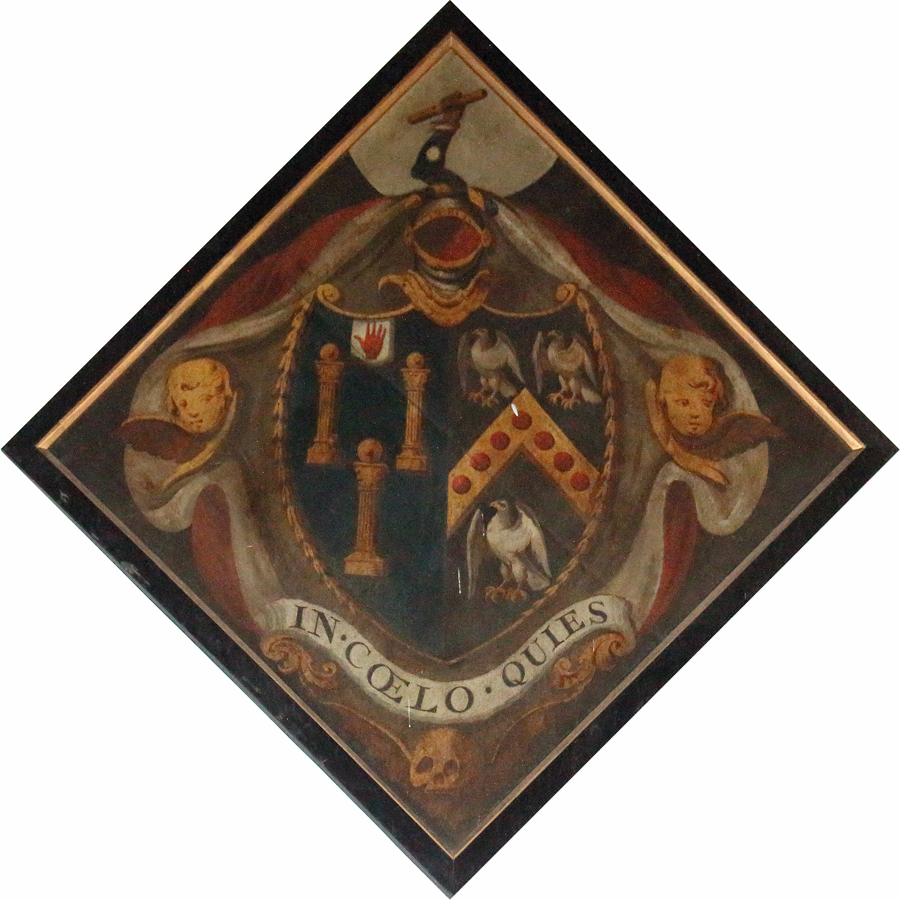
Funerary hatchment of Sir John Major, 1st Baronet in Church of St Mary Magdalene, Thornham Magna

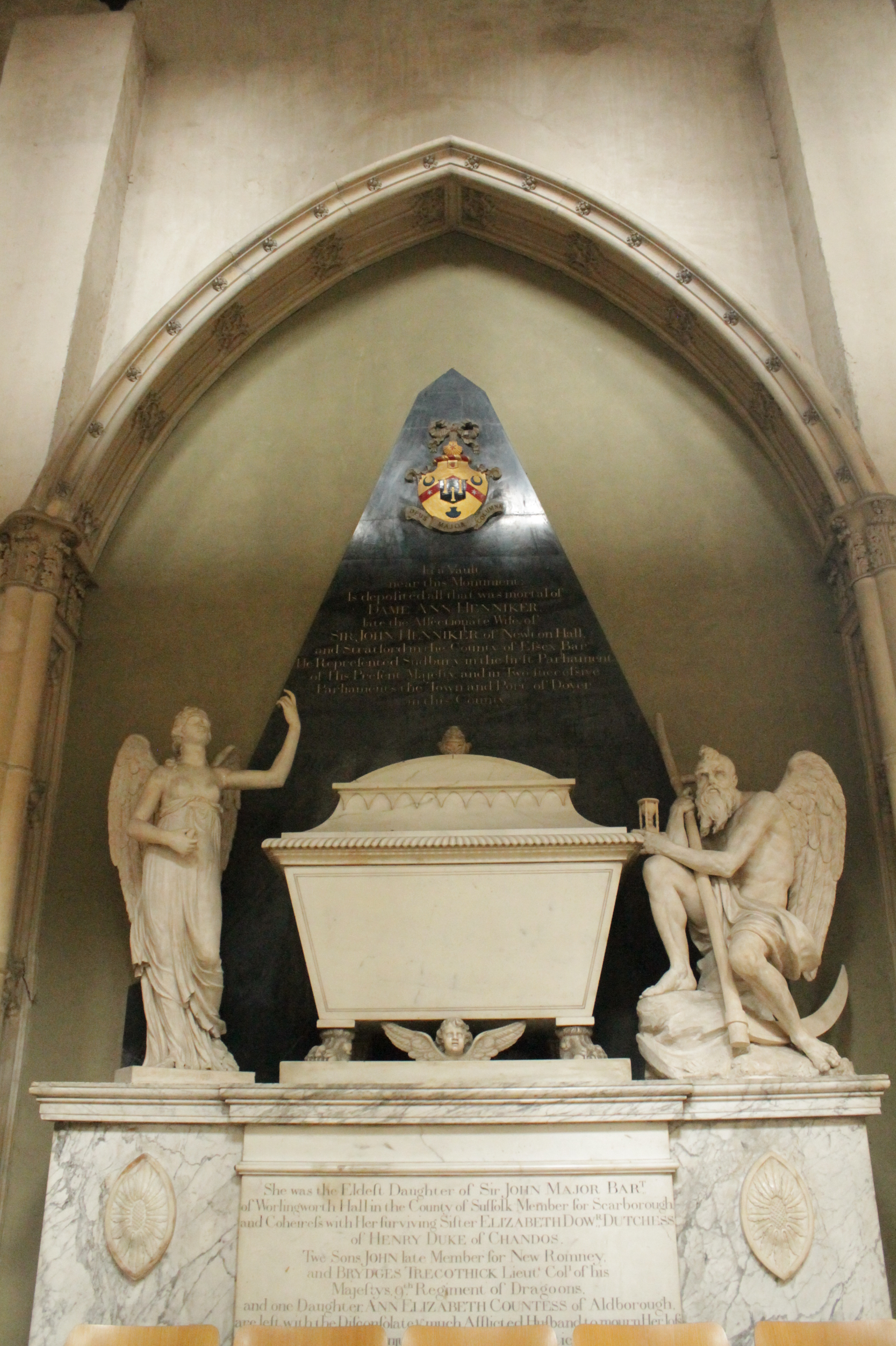
Monument to Anne Major, eldest daughter and co-heiress of Sir John Major, 1st Baronet and wife of John Henniker, 1st Baron Henniker. Rochester Cathedral, Kent

Sir John Major, 1st Baronet (17 May 1698 – 22 February 1781) was a British merchant, Member of Parliament and Sheriff of Sussex. Major was born at Bridlington in the East Riding of Yorkshire, and started in business there, commanding a ship in the Stockholm trade. He apparently abandoned the sea at the age of around 30, but subsequently developed a thriving iron trade becoming eventually the largest dealer in the country. He built up a considerable fortune, acquiring extensive estates in Suffolk and Sussex and other land elsewhere in England, to a value of around £5,000 a year. Nevertheless, he put his shipping interests at the service of the nation when necessary, apparently at considerable cost to himself, providing ships to transport troops in time of war on more than one occasion.

In 1724 he married Elizabeth Dale, daughter of another Bridlington merchant, and they had two daughters – Anne, who married John Henniker in 1747, and Elizabeth, who married Henry Brydges, 2nd Duke of Chandos in 1767. At the age of 60 he decided to stand for Parliament, and in 1761 was elected unopposed as MP for Scarborough (the nearest borough to Bridlington, where his business interests presumably gave him an influence); at the same election, his son-in-law Henniker was returned for Sudbury, and the two thereafter formed a close political and business partnership, seeking the government contracts that in those days were generally awarded to MPs ahead of their commercial rivals. They secured among others a contract for victualling the British troops in West Florida, and grants of land – 20,000 acres (81 km^{2}) each – in Nova Scotia.

At the same time, Henniker lobbied the government to create Major a baronet. (Henniker's letter to the Prime Minister, George Grenville, in which he put his case, quoted by Namier & Brooke, is the main source of information on Major's early life.) On 5 July 1765, Major was created a Baronet, of Worlingsworth Hall in the County of Suffolk, with a special remainder to Henniker. Just five days after the warrant was signed Grenville's administration, to which Henniker and Major had adhered, was dismissed; the opportunity might easily not have arisen again. At the next election in 1768, Major was opposed by a government candidate at Scarborough and defeated. He did not stand for Parliament again.

Major died on 22 February 1781, aged 82, and was succeeded in the baronetcy according to the special remainder by his son-in-law John Henniker, who was elevated to the Peerage of Ireland as Baron Henniker in 1800. He was also a Senior Elder Brother of Trinity House between 1741 and 1781, a director of the South Sea Company and was High Sheriff of Sussex for 1755–56.

Parliament of Great Britain
Preceded by William Osbaldstone; Sir Ralph Milbanke	Member of Parliament for Scarborough; 1761 – 1768; With: William Osbaldstone 1761–1766; Fountayne Wentworth Osbaldstone 1766–1768	Succeeded by Fountayne Wentworth Osbaldstone; George Manners
Baronetage of Great Britain
New creation	Baronet (of Worlingsworth Hall); 1765–1785	Succeeded by John Henniker
