= Charles Berkeley, 3rd Baron FitzHardinge =

Charles Paget Fitzhardinge Berkeley, 3rd Baron FitzHardinge (19 April 1830 – 5 December 1916), styled The Honourable Charles Berkeley between 1861 and 1896, was a British Liberal politician.

Berkeley was the son of Admiral Maurice Berkeley, 1st Baron FitzHardinge, illegitimate son of Frederick Berkeley, 5th Earl of Berkeley. His mother was Lady Charlotte Lennox, daughter of General Charles Lennox, 4th Duke of Richmond. He was the nephew of William Berkeley, 1st Earl FitzHardinge, Craven Berkeley, Grantley Berkeley and Henry FitzHardinge Berkeley and the younger brother of Francis Berkeley, 2nd Baron FitzHardinge. He was educated at Rugby.

Berkeley was returned to parliament as one of two representatives for Gloucester in 1862, a seat he held until 1865. In 1896 he succeeded his childless elder brother in the barony. Lord FitzHardinge married Louisa Elizabeth Lindow, daughter of Henry Lindow Lindow, of Gawcomb, Gloucestershire, in London in 1856. There were no children from the marriage. Lady FitzHardinge died at Berkeley square in London on 15 November 1902. Lord FitzHardinge died at Berkeley Castle, Gloucestershire, in December 1916, aged 86, when the barony became extinct.

Parliament of the United Kingdom
Preceded by William Philip Price; Charles James Monk	Member of Parliament for Gloucester; 1862–1865; With: John Joseph Powell	Succeeded by William Philip Price; Charles James Monk
Peerage of the United Kingdom
Preceded by Francis Berkeley	Baron FitzHardinge; 1896–1916	Extinct
