= Charles James Monk =

English politician (1824–1900)

Monk in 1895.

Charles James Monk (30 November 1824 – 10 November 1900) was an English Liberal politician who sat in the House of Commons between 1859 and 1900.

Monk was born at Peterborough, the son of Rt. Rev. James Henry Monk Bishop of Gloucester and Bristol, and his wife Jane Smart Hughes daughter of Rev. Hugh Hughes of Huneaton Warwickshire. He was educated at Eton College and Trinity College, Cambridge. At Cambridge he was the Sir W Browne's Medallist in 1845, University Members Prizeman in 1846 and 1847 and he graduated junior optime in 1847. In 1850, he was called to the bar at Lincoln's Inn. He became Chancellor of the diocese of Bristol in 1855 and Chancellor of diocese of Gloucester in 1859. He was also a Deputy Lieutenant and J.P. for Gloucestershire

At the 1857 general election Monk stood for parliament unsuccessfully at Cricklade.

He was elected as one of the two Members of Parliament (MPs) for Gloucester at the 1859 general election but was unseated on petition. He was re-elected for Gloucester in 1865 and held the seat until 1885. He was author of the Revenue Officers' Disabilities Removal Act, 1868.

Monk did not stand in the 1885 general election, when the parliamentary borough of Gloucester was abolished and the name transferred to a new county division with the same name, but covering a bigger area. He unsuccessfully contested the new seat in 1892, but won it in 1895 and held it until he stood down at the 1900 general election, shortly before his death.

Monk married Julia Ralli, daughter of P. S. Ralli of London in 1853.

Monk was President of the Association of Chambers of Commerce of the United Kingdom from 1881 to 1884 and became a director of the Suez Canal Company in 1884. He was author of The Golden Horn.

Monk lived at Bedwell Park, Hatfield, Hertfordshire, where he died at the age of 75.

Parliament of the United Kingdom
Preceded by Robert Carden; William Philip Price	Member of Parliament for Gloucester; 1859 – 1862; With: William Philip Price	Succeeded by Charles Berkeley; John Joseph Powell
Preceded by Charles Berkeley; John Joseph Powell	Member of Parliament for Gloucester; 1865 – 1885; With: William Philip Price 1865–73; William Killigrew Wait 1873–80; Thomas Robinson from 1880	Succeeded by Thomas Robinson
Preceded by Thomas Robinson	Member of Parliament for Gloucester; 1895 – 1900	Succeeded by Russell Rea
