= 1866 Eye by-election =

UK parliamentary by-election

The 1866 Eye by-election was held on 27 July 1866 after the incumbent Conservative MP Edward Kerrison resigned to contest East Suffolk. The seat was uncontested and won by George Barrington who was the Private Secretary to the Earl of Derby.
