= John Rolt =

English lawyer, politician and judge

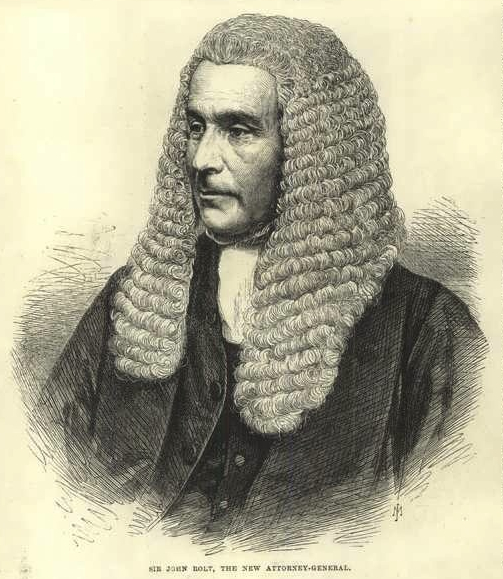
Image from The Illustrated London News, Page 648, 10 December 1866 showing an article about Sir John Rolt being announced as Attorney General.

Sir John Rolt, PC (5 October 1804 – 6 June 1871) was an English lawyer, Conservative politician, and judge who served as Attorney General under Lord Derby.

== Early life ==
John was the second son of James Rolt, a merchant of Calcutta, and Anne (née Braine). He was born in Calcutta and brought to England by his mother about 1810. He was educated at dissenting private schools at Chipping Norton and Islington. He was orphaned by mid-1814 after the deaths of his bankrupt father in September 1812 or 1813, and his mother in May 1814. He thus became dependent upon his maternal grandparents, yeoman farmers at Fairfield, Gloucestershire. Around Christmas 1818, Rolt was apprenticed to a London firm of woollendrapers.

Although his hours were long, he managed, by early rising and reading as he walked, to educate himself despite the disadvantages of his early life. On the expiration of his indentures in 1822–23, he found employment in a Manchester warehouse in Newgate Street, which he exchanged in 1827 for a clerkship in a proctor's office at Doctors' Commons. His next step was to obtain two secretaryships. One to a school for orphans, the other to the Mill Hill School.

== Legal and political careers ==
Meanwhile, he pursued his studies, and in 1833 entered the Inner Temple, where he was called to the Bar on 9 June 1837. Confining himself to the Court of Chancery, he rapidly acquired an extensive practice, in particular following his opinion for a large London firm in Stubbs v Lister, which also led to a friendship with Edwin Wilkins Field.

He took silk in Trinity vacation 1846. After some unsuccessful attempts to enter parliament, he was returned for the Conservatives for West Gloucestershire on 31 March 1857, and for ten years continued to represent the same constituency. In 1862, he carried through the House of Commons the measure commonly known as Rolt's Act, by which an important step was taken towards the fusion of law and equity. In 1866 he succeeded Sir Hugh Cairns as Attorney General on 29 October, and was knighted on 10 November.

On 18 July 1867, he succeeded Sir George James Turner as Lord Justice of Appeal, and on 3 August was sworn to the Privy Council. Incipient paralysis, due to long-continued overwork, compelled his resignation in February 1868, and on 6 June 1871 he died at his estate, Ozleworth Park, Wotton-under-Edge, Gloucestershire. He was buried on 12 June in Ozleworth churchyard.

== Private and family life ==
In early life Rolt abandoned the dissenters and became a passionate adherent of the Church of England. He married twice:

- In 1826 to Sarah (died 1850), daughter of Thomas Bosworth of Bosworth, Leicestershire. The couple had four daughters and a son who succeeded to John's property.
- In 1857 to Elizabeth (died 1867), daughter of Stephen Godson of Croydon. The couple had a son.

== Legacy and assessment ==
It has been said that In parliament Rolt made no great figure, but he voted steadily with his party, and did the drudgery connected with the carriage of the Reform Bill of 1867. Rolt was neither a profound lawyer nor a great advocate; but he was thoroughly versed in chancery practice, had sound judgment, and quickness of apprehension.

== Bibliography ==
- This article incorporates facts from Leigh Rayment's Peerage Pages

Obituaries:

- Law Magazine (1873–4), 117–55 [JW];
- The Times, 8 June 1871;
- Solicitors' Journal, 15 (1870–71), 580–81;
- Law Journal, 9 June 1871, 381.
- Le Quesne, C. T. (ed) (1939) Memoirs of Sir John Rolt ·
- Rigg, J. M. (1897). "Rolt, John" . In Lee, Sidney (ed.). Dictionary of National Biography. Vol. 49. London: Smith, Elder & Co.
- —, rev. P. Polden (2004) "Rolt, Sir John (1804–1871)", Oxford Dictionary of National Biography, Oxford University Press, accessed 8 Nov 2008]

Attribution

- This article incorporates text from a publication now in the public domain: "Rolt, John". Dictionary of National Biography. London: Smith, Elder & Co. 1885–1900.

Parliament of the United Kingdom
Preceded by Robert Blagden Hale; Nigel Kingscote	Member of Parliament for West Gloucestershire; 1857–1867; With: Nigel Kingscote	Succeeded by Nigel Kingscote; Edward Arthur Somerset
Legal offices
Preceded by Sir Hugh Cairns	Attorney General for England and Wales; 1866–1867	Succeeded by Sir John Burgess Karslake
