= Frederick Snowdon Corrance =

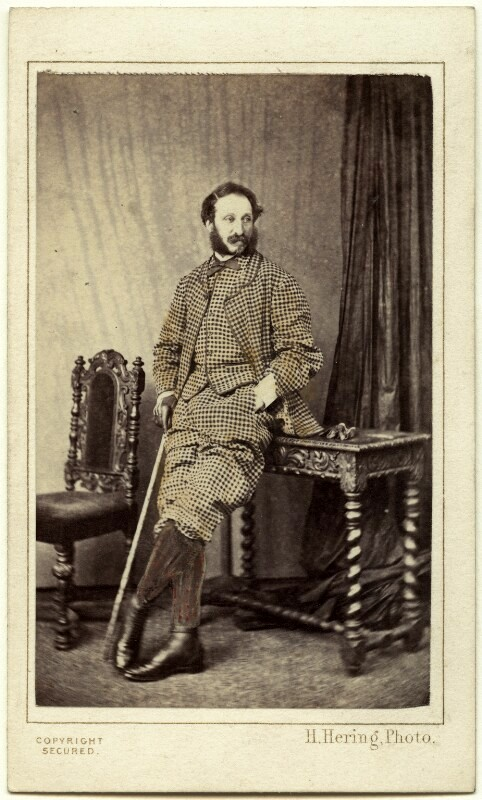
Frederick Corrance by H Hering

Frederick Snowdon Corrance (born White; 17 January 1822 – 31 October 1906) was an English Conservative politician who sat in the House of Commons from 1867 to 1874.

Corrance was the son of Frederick White of Parham Hall, Suffolk, and his wife, Frances Woodley. His father assumed the name of Corrance in 1837. He was educated at Harrow School and at Trinity College, Cambridge. In April 1842, he joined the army as cornet in the 11th Hussars and retired in 1844. He was a deputy lieutenant and J.P. for Suffolk.

Corrance was elected member of parliament (MP) for East Suffolk at a by-election in 1867. He held the seat until 1874.

Corrance lived at Parham Hall and died at the age of 84.

Corrance married Frances Maria du Cane, daughter of Captain Du Cane RN of Braxted Park, Essex, in 1860. They had one child Charles Frederick Corrance born 14 September 1862, who died on 5 September 1876, aged thirteen.

Parliament of the United Kingdom
Preceded by Sir Edward Kerrison, Bt; John Henniker-Major	Member of Parliament for East Suffolk; 1867 – 1874; With: John Henniker-Major to 1870; Viscount Mahon from 1870	Succeeded by Viscount Mahon; The Lord Rendlesham
