= 1867 East Suffolk by-election =

UK parliamentary by-election

The 1867 East Suffolk by-election was held on 20 February 1867 after the resignation of the Conservative MP Sir Edward Kerrison. It was retained by the Conservative candidate Frederick Snowdon Corrance.

East Suffolk by-election, 1867
Party	Candidate	Votes	%	±%
Conservative	Frederick Snowdon Corrance	2,486	54.0	N/A
Liberal	Sir Shafto Adair	2,120	46.0	New
Majority		366	8.0	N/A
Turnout		4,606	68.1	N/A
Conservative hold		Swing		
