= William Philip Price =

English timber merchant and Liberal politician

William Philip Price (1817 – 31 March 1891) was an English timber merchant and Liberal politician who sat in the House of Commons in two periods between 1852 and 1873.

Price was the son of William Price of Gloucester and his wife Frances George, daughter of Phillip George of Bristol. He was educated privately. He ran a successful timber company, and was also involved in the Railway industry, being a director of the Midland Railway Company. In 1840 he became a director of the Gloucester Banking Company, and was later made the chairman in 1865. Price was a Deputy Lieutenant and J.P. for Gloucestershire and in 1849 was made High Sheriff of Gloucestershire.

In July 1852 Price was elected Member of Parliament for Gloucester. In 1857 his re-election was investigated for bribery, and it was found that his agents had been bribing voters, although he himself was not aware of it. He was unseated in 1859.

Price was re-elected MP for Gloucester in the 1865 general election, but left parliament in May 1873 to become a railway commissioner. Price is one of the few Member of Parliament to be made both Steward of the Manor of Northstead and Steward of the Chiltern Hundreds.

Price married Frances Ann Chadborn, daughter of John Chadborn of Gloucester. Their son William Edwin Price was MP for Tewkesbury.

| Preceded by Henry Hope; Maurice Berkeley | Member of Parliament for Gloucester; 1852 – 1859; With: Sir Robert Carden to 1859; Charles James Monk from 1859 | Succeeded by John Joseph Powell; Charles Berkeley |
| Preceded by Charles Berkeley; John Joseph Powell | Member of Parliament for Gloucester; 1865 – 1873; With: Charles James Monk | Succeeded by Charles James Monk; William Killigrew Wait |
Honorary titles
| Preceded by William Capel | High Sheriff of Gloucestershire; 1849 | Succeeded by Thomas Gambier Parry |
