= William Humphery =

Sir William Henry Humphery, 1st Baronet, CB (25 March 1827 – 31 March 1909) was a British Conservative politician.

Humphery was the son of John Humphery, Lord Mayor of London and Member of Parliament for Southwark, by his wife Mary Burgess, daughter of William Burgess. He was returned to Parliament for Andover in 1863 (succeeding his deceased father-in-law William Cubitt), a seat he held until 1867, when he resigned through his appointment as Steward of the Chiltern Hundreds. In 1868, he was created a baronet, of Penton Lodge in the County of Southampton. He also served as High Sheriff of Hampshire from 1872 to 1873.

During the invasion scare of 1859–60 Humphery raised the 13th (Andover) Hampshire Rifle Volunteer Corps and commanded it with the rank of captain. The unit was included in the 1st Administrative Battalion, Hampshire Rifle Volunteers, based in Winchester and on 15 August 1863 he was promoted to lieutenant-colonel to command the battalion, which later became the 1st Volunteer Battalion of the Hampshire Regiment. The battalion was included in the new Portsmouth Brigade in 1889, and Humphery was promoted to colonel to command this brigade on 28 January.

Humphery married firstly Maria Cubitt, daughter of William Cubitt, in 1850. After her death in 1897 he married secondly Mary Catherine Alderson, daughter of Sir Edward Hall Alderson, in 1898. He died in March 1909, aged 82, when the baronetcy became extinct.

Parliament of the United Kingdom
Preceded by Hon. Dudley Fortescue; William Cubitt	Member of Parliament for Andover; 1863–1867; With: Hon. Dudley Fortescue	Succeeded by Hon. Dudley Fortescue; Sir John Burgess Karslake
Baronetage of the United Kingdom
New creation	Baronet (of Penton Lodge); 1868–1909	Extinct
