= John Burgess Karslake =

English lawyer and politician

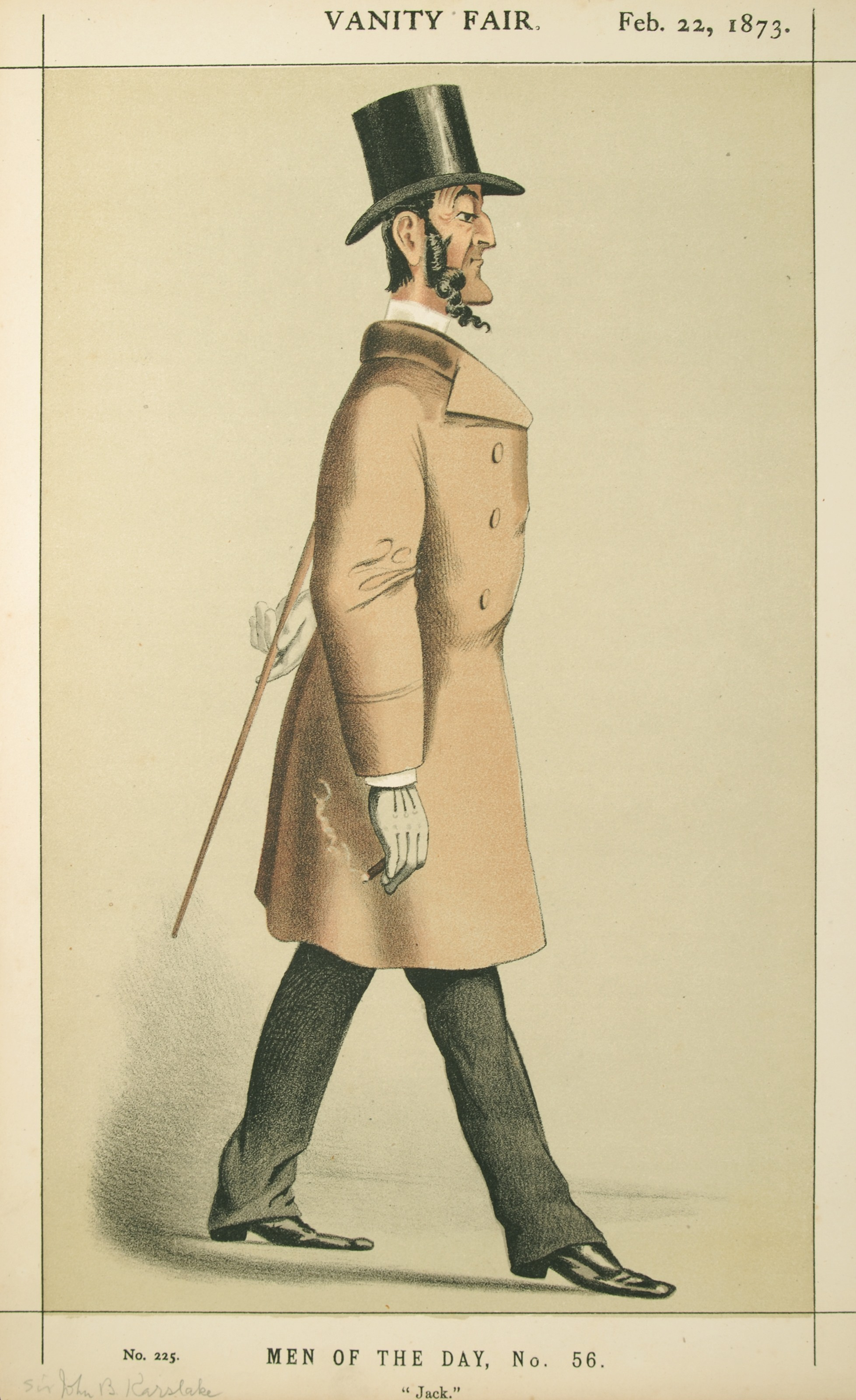
"Jack". Caricature by Lyall published in Vanity Fair in 1873.

Sir John Burgess Karslake, QC (13 December 1821 – 4 October 1881) was an English lawyer and politician.

The son of Henry Karslake, a solicitor and Confidential Secretary to the Duke of Kent, by his wife Elizabeth Marsh Preston, the daughter of Richard Preston, Q.C. and sometime M.P. for Ashburton, he was educated at Harrow. His elder brother, Edward Kent Karslake (1820-1892), was a Q.C., sometime M.P. for Colchester and Fellow of Balliol College, Oxford.

He was appointed a barrister of the Middle Temple in 1846, and a Queen's Counsel in 1861. He held office as Solicitor-General for England in 1866-67 and as Attorney-General for England from 1867 to 1868 and again in 1874. He was knighted in 1866 and appointed a Privy Counsellor in 1876. He was a member of the Judicature Commission. In 1875 he was appointed a member of a Royal Commission on scientific procedures on live animals.

Between 1867 and 1868 he was a Conservative Party Member of Parliament for Andover. That constituency was reduced to one seat in 1868 and Karslake unsuccessfully contested Exeter at the general election of that year. He was MP for Huntingdon 1873–1876. He died in Marylebone aged 59, unmarried, having had to retire from Parliament in February 1876 due to progressively worsening eyesight, which finally resulted in total blindness.

He was the brother or nephew of John Karslake Karslake.

== Sources ==
- Who's Who of British Members of Parliament, Volume I 1832-1885, edited by M. Stenton (The Harvester Press 1976)
- Concise Dictionary of National Biography

Parliament of the United Kingdom
Preceded by Dudley Fortescue; William Humphery	Member of Parliament for Andover; 1867–1868; With: Dudley Fortescue	Succeeded by Hon. Dudley Fortescue
Preceded by Thomas Baring	Member of Parliament for Huntingdon; 1873–1876	Succeeded by Viscount Hinchingbrooke
Legal offices
Preceded by Sir William Bovill	Solicitor General; 1866	Succeeded by Sir Charles Jasper Selwyn
Preceded by Sir John Rolt	Attorney General; 1867–1868	Succeeded by Sir Robert Collier
Preceded by Sir Henry James	Attorney General; 1874	Succeeded by Sir Richard Baggallay
