= John Henniker-Major, 5th Baron Henniker =

British peer and Conservative politician (1842–1902)

The Right Honourable The Lord Henniker VD DL
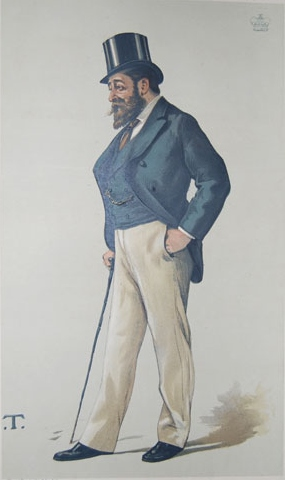
- "A man of business" Lord Henniker as caricatured by Théobald Chartran in Vanity Fair, July 1882.

12th Lieutenant Governor of the Isle of Man
- In office 1895–1902
- Monarchs: Victoria, Edward VII
- Preceded by: Sir West Ridgeway
- Succeeded by: The Lord Raglan

Personal details
- Born: John Major Henniker-Major; 7 November 1842
- Died: 27 June 1902 (aged 59) Douglas, Isle of Man
- Spouse: Lady Alice Mary Cuffe

John Major Henniker-Major, 5th Baron Henniker VD DL (7 November 1842 – 27 June 1902), was a British peer and Conservative politician.

== Background and education ==
Henniker was the son of John Henniker-Major, 4th Baron Henniker, and was educated at Eton and Trinity College, Cambridge,

== Political career ==
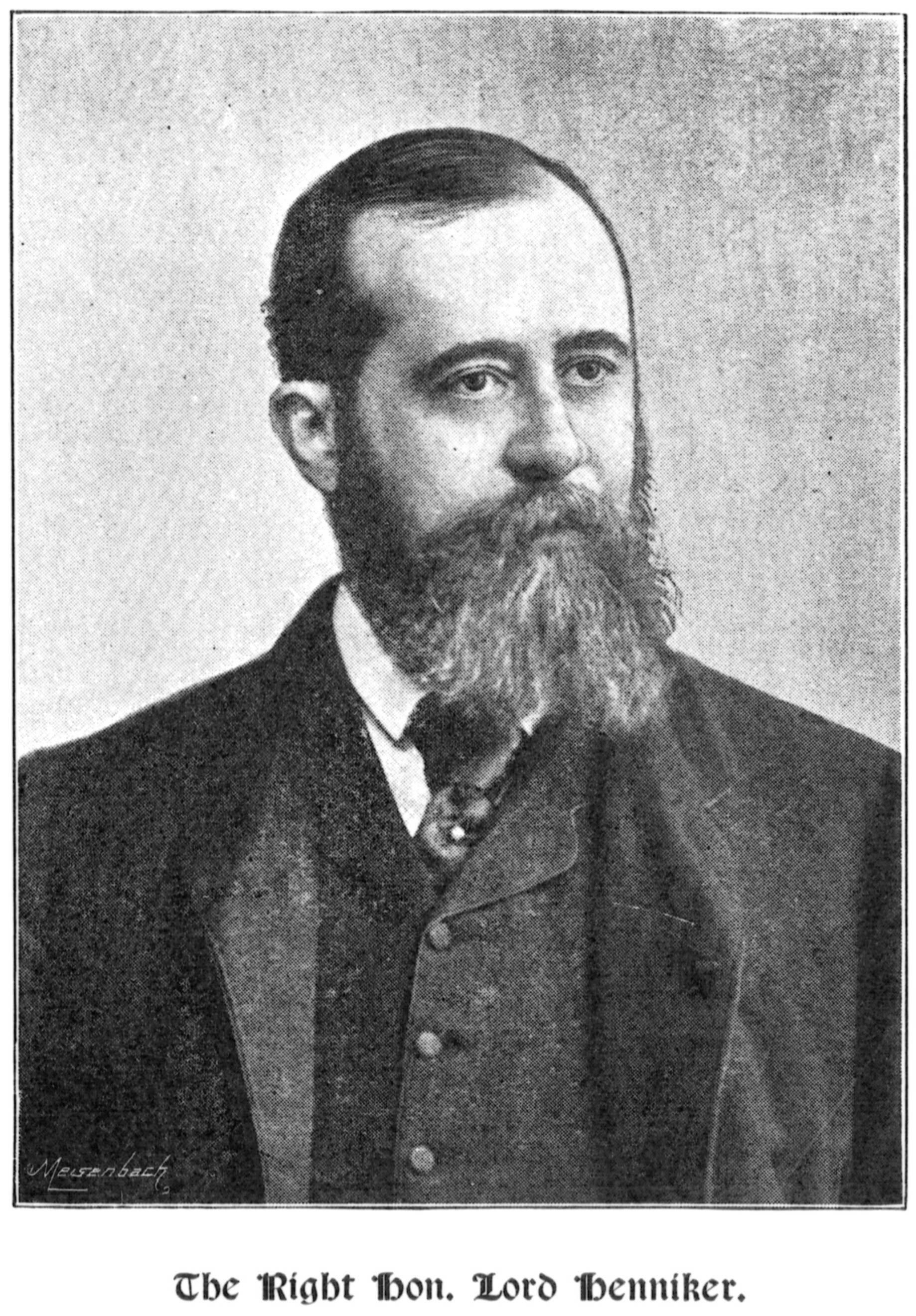
Pictured in Suffolk Celebrities, 1893

Henniker was elected MP for East Suffolk in 1866, succeeding his father. He held the seat until 1870, when he succeeded his father as fifth Baron Henniker and second Baron Hartismere. The latter title had been granted to his father in 1866, and gave him a seat in the House of Lords (in contrast to the barony of Henniker which was in the Peerage of Ireland). In 1877 Henniker was appointed a Lord-in-waiting (government whip in the House of Lords) in the Conservative government of Benjamin Disraeli, a post he held until the government fell in 1880, and again under Lord Salisbury between 1885 and 1886, between 1886 and 1892, and briefly in 1895. He was appointed Lieutenant Governor of the Isle of Man in 1895, serving as such until his death in 1902.

Lord Henniker was for many years chairman of the quarter sessions and of the county council for East Suffolk. He was an Honorary Colonel of the 6th Volunteer Battalion of the Suffolk Regiment, and received the Volunteer Officers' Decoration.

== Family ==
Lord Henniker married, in 1864, Lady Alice Mary Cuffe (d.1893), daughter of John Cuffe, 3rd Earl of Desart. They had twelve children, including:

- Hon. Alice Margaret Mary Henniker-Major (1870–1923), a soprano singer; m. in 1902 the conductor Julian Seymour Clifford (1877–1921), and left children.
- Charles Henniker-Major, 6th Baron Henniker (1872–1956)
- Hon. Gerald Arthur George Henniker-Major (b.1872)
- Hon. Ethel Elizabeth Emily Henniker-Major (b.1874)
- Hon. Victor Alexander Henniker-Major (b.1878)
- Hon. Lilian Bertha Aline Henniker-Major (b.1880)
- John Ernest de Grey Henniker-Major (1883–1980), a Page of Honour to Queen Victoria 1895–99, later 7th Baron Henniker; who left issue including successive barons.
- Hon. Dorothy Florence Stella Henniker-Major (b.1885)

He died at Government House, Isle of Man, on 27 June 1902, aged 59, and was succeeded in his titles by his eldest surviving son, Charles. A state funeral service was held at St. George's Church, Douglas, on 29 June 1902, and his remains were interred at the family burial ground in Thornham, Suffolk, three days later.

== See also ==
- Parliament of the United Kingdom
- Politics of the United Kingdom

Parliament of the United Kingdom
Preceded by Sir Fitzroy Kelly; The Lord Henniker	Member of Parliament for East Suffolk; 1866–1870; With: Sir Edward Clarence Kerrison 1866–1867; Frederick Snowdon Corrance 1867–1870	Succeeded by Frederick Snowdon Corrance; Viscount Mahon
Political offices
Preceded by The Earl of Jersey	Lord-in-waiting; 1877–1880	Succeeded by The Lord Sudeley
Preceded by The Lord Ribblesdale	Lord-in-waiting; 1885–1886	Succeeded by The Lord Kensington
Preceded by The Lord Ribblesdale	Lord-in-waiting; 1886–1892	Succeeded by The Lord Camoys
Preceded by The Earl Granville	Lord-in-waiting; 1895	Succeeded by The Earl of Kintore
Government offices
Preceded by Sir West Ridgeway	Lieutenant Governor of the Isle of Man; 1895–1902	Succeeded by The Lord Raglan
Peerage of Ireland
Preceded by John Henniker-Major	Baron Henniker; 1870–1902	Succeeded by Charles Henniker-Major
Peerage of the United Kingdom
Preceded by John Henniker-Major	Baron Hartismere; 1870–1902	Succeeded by Charles Henniker-Major
