= John Joseph Powell =

British barrister and Member of Parliament

John Joseph Powell (1816 – 15 September 1891), was a British barrister, and Member of Parliament for Gloucester, 1862–1865.

== Life ==
He was the eldest son of Thomas Powell of Gloucester, and was born there on 3 September 1816. He entered Middle Temple on 28 May 1842, was called to the bar on 16 April 1847, and went to the Oxford circuit. He became Queen's Counsel on 3 February 1863, Bencher of his Inn on 13 November 1863, and Treasurer in 1876.

Powell sat as MP for Gloucester February from 1862 to 1865, and unsuccessfully contested Weymouth in 1868, and Gloucester in 1874.

He was Recorder of Wolverhampton from 21 May 1864 to 1891, and a Judge of County Courts for the West Riding of Yorkshire (circuit No. 14) from 9 April 1884 until 1885, and Greenwich (circuit No. 47) October 1885 till his death.

He died unmarried, suddenly, while on a visit at Widmore Lodge, Bickley, on 15 September 1891, aged 75.

== Notes ==
Parliament of the United Kingdom
Preceded by William Philip Price; Charles James Monk	Member of Parliament for Gloucester; 1862–1865; With: Hon. Charles Berkeley	Succeeded by William Philip Price; Charles James Monk
