= Sir Edward Kerrison, 2nd Baronet =

British politician (1821-1886)

Sir Edward Clarence Kerrison, 2nd Baronet (2 January 1821, Brighton – 11 July 1886) was a British Conservative Party politician and the Member of Parliament for the borough of Eye.

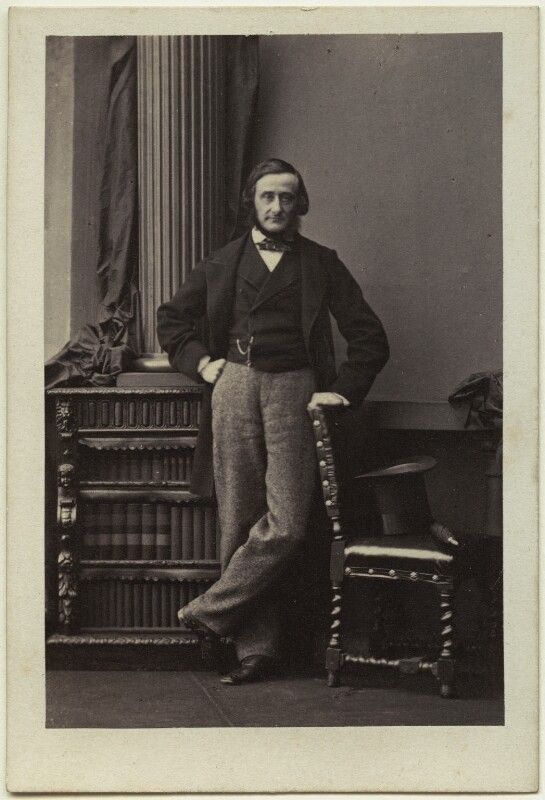
Sir Edward Clarence Kerrison, 2nd Baronet, 1861

== Biography ==
Kerrison was the eldest son of General Sir Edward Kerrison, 1st Baronet and his wife Mary Martha Ellice. He was born at Wick House, Brighton in 1821.

He married Lady Caroline Margaret Fox-Strangways, daughter of Henry Fox-Strangways, 3rd Earl of Ilchester, on 23 July 1844, but had no children.

He succeeded his father in 1852 as Member of Parliament for the borough of Eye and as baronet the following year. He represented Eye until 1866 when he resigned to successfully stand as the Conservative candidate in a by election in East Suffolk, although he resigned the next year.

He joined the board of the Great Eastern Railway as a Deputy Chairman in 1866.

Described as a "Great friend of the agricultural laborers", he also took part in the building of a branch railway to Eye. He died at Brome Hall, Suffolk in 1886, and the baronetcy became extinct.

Parliament of the United Kingdom
Preceded by Sir Edward Kerrison, Bt	Member of Parliament for Eye; 1852–1866	Succeeded by George Barrington
Preceded by Fitzroy Kelly; John Henniker-Major	Member of Parliament for East Suffolk; 1866–1867; With: John Henniker-Major	Succeeded by John Henniker-Major; Frederick Snowdon Corrance
Baronetage of the United Kingdom
Preceded by Edward Kerrison	Baronet (of Wick House); 1853–1886	Extinct
