= 1808 Stamford by-election =

UK parliamentary by-election

The 1808 Stamford by-election was held on 30 January 1808, following the death of the incumbent Tory MP John Leland. The by-election was won by the Tory candidate Evan Foulkes, who stood unopposed.
