= George Finch (politician, born 1794) =

British landowner and politician

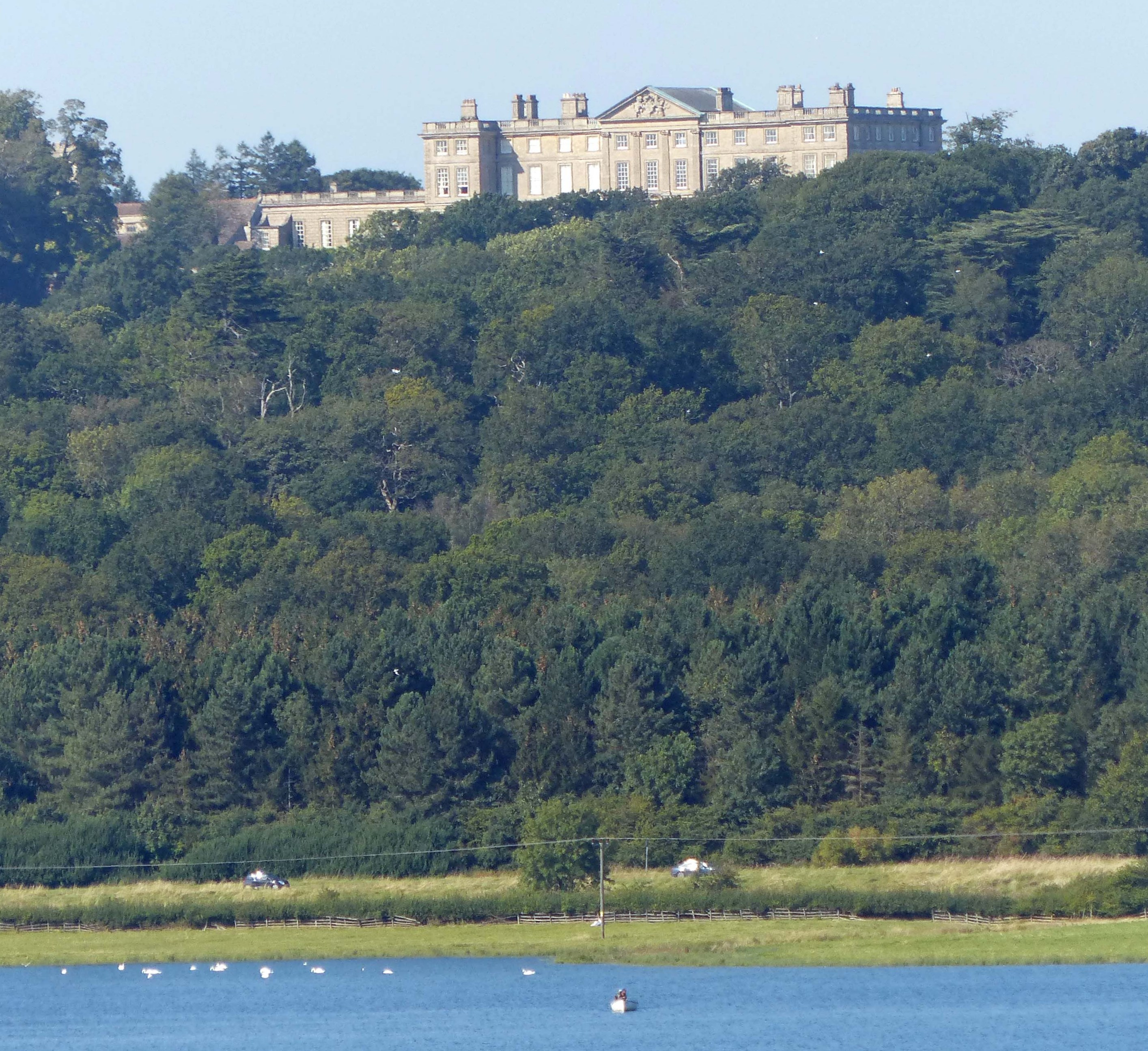
Burley House, Rutland

George Somerset Finch (né Thompson 1794 – 29 June 1870), of Burley-on-the-Hill, Rutland, was a British landowner and politician.

== Background ==
Finch was the illegitimate son of George Finch, 9th Earl of Winchilsea, and Mrs Phoebe Thompson, and was educated at Harrow School (1805–11) and Trinity College, Cambridge (1811). In 1808 he was granted a licence to use the Finch arms. On his father's death in 1826, the title went to his father's first cousin, the 10th Earl of Winchilsea, but the large Finch estate was not entailed, thus the estate that might have been expected to go with the title instead was able to be left to him despite his illegitimacy, and so he inherited substantial estates including the seat of the Earls of Winchilsea, Burley House near Oakham, Rutland, and a large fortune. His estate generated an income of £29,000 a year.

== Political career ==
Finch sat as Member of Parliament for Lymington between 1820 and 1821, for Stamford between 1832 and 1837 and for Rutland between 1846 and 1847.

He was High Sheriff of Rutland for 1829–30.

== Family ==
Finch was twice married. He married firstly, Jane, daughter of Vice-Admiral John Richard Delap Tollemache, in 1819. After her early death in 1821 he married secondly Lady Louisa, daughter of Henry Somerset, 6th Duke of Beaufort, in 1832, with whom he had 2 sons and 2 daughters.

Finch died in June 1870. Lady Louisa survived him by over twenty years and died in August 1892. Burley House passed to his son George, who was also a politician.

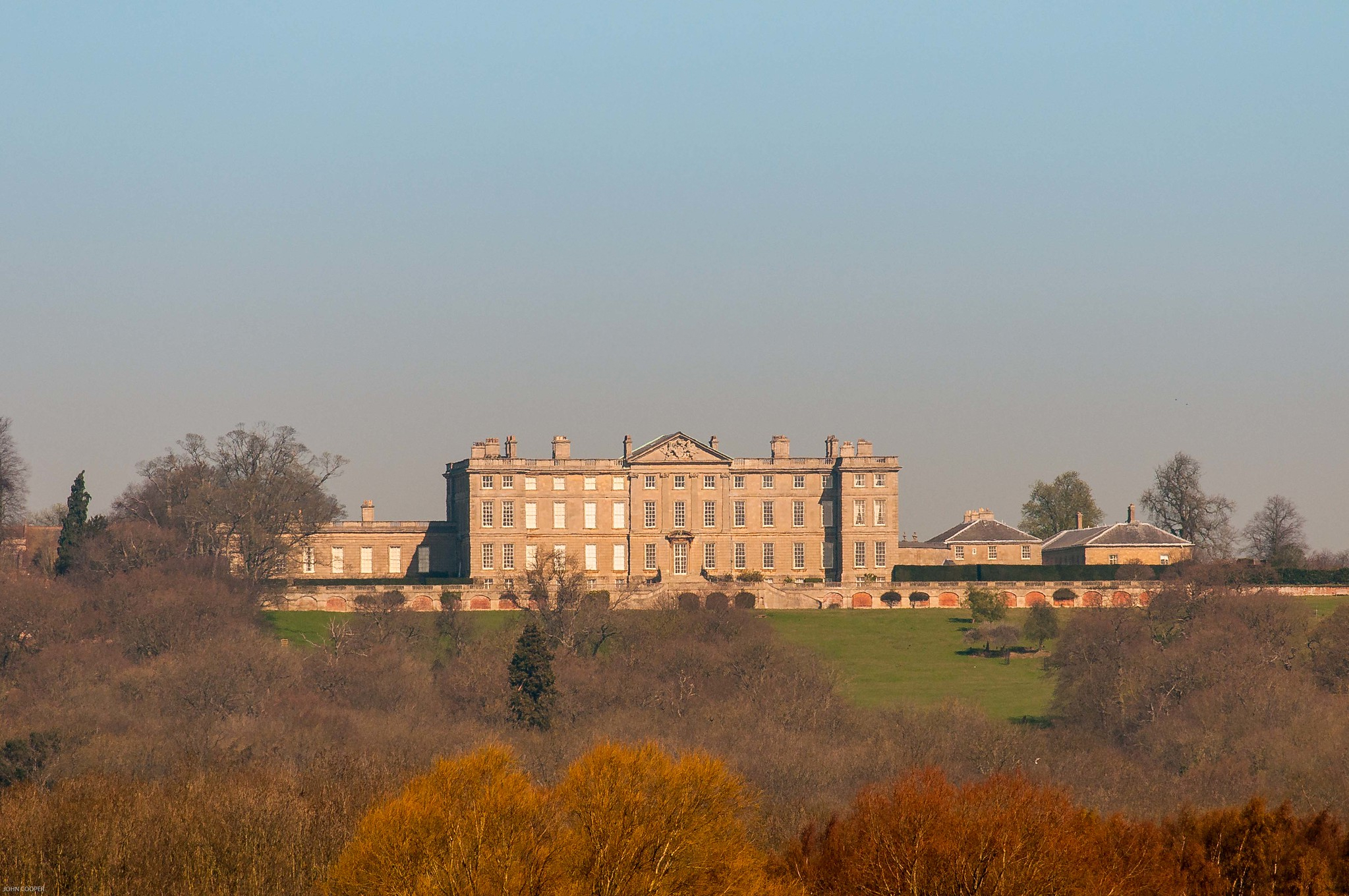
Burley House from the garden

== See also ==
- Earl of Winchilsea and Nottingham
- George Finch-Hatton, 10th Earl of Winchilsea

Parliament of the United Kingdom
Preceded by Sir Harry Burrard-Neale, Bt; William Manning	Member of Parliament for Lymington; 1820–1821; With: Sir Harry Burrard-Neale, Bt	Succeeded by Sir Harry Burrard-Neale, Bt; William Manning
Preceded by Lord Thomas Cecil; Charles Tennyson	Member of Parliament for Stamford; 1832–1837; With: Thomas Chaplin	Succeeded by Thomas Chaplin; The Marquess of Granby
Preceded by Sir Gilbert Heathcote, Bt; The Viscount Downe	Member of Parliament for Rutland; 1846–1847; With: Sir Gilbert Heathcote, Bt	Succeeded by Sir Gilbert Heathcote, Bt; Hon. Gerard Noel
