= 1809 Stamford by-election =

UK parliamentary by-election

- February 27, 1809

Stamford constituency
- Turnout: 448
	First party	Second party
Candidate	Charles Chaplin	Jephson Oddy
Party	Tory	Whig
Popular vote	306	142
Percentage	68.3%	31.7%
MP before election
Albemarle Bertie
Tory
Elected MP
Charles Chaplin
Tory

The 1809 Stamford by-election was held on 7 March 1809, when the incumbent Tory MP Albemarle Bertie became ineligible after acceding to the Earldom of Lindsey. The by-election was won by the Tory candidate Charles Chaplin.

== Result ==
By-Election 27 February 1809: Stamford
Party	Candidate	Votes	%	±%
Tory	Charles Chaplin	306	68.3	N/A
Whig	Jephson Oddy	142	31.7	New
Majority		154	36.6	N/A
Turnout		448		N/A
Tory hold				
