= May 1866 Stamford by-election =

UK parliamentary by-election

The May 1866 Stamford by-election was held on 8 May 1866, when the incumbent Conservative MP Stafford Northcote resigned to contest a by-election in North Devon. The by-election was won by the Conservative Party candidate John Dalrymple-Hay, who stood unopposed.
