= Lord Field =

Lord Field may refer to:

- William Field, 1st Baron Field (1813–1907), English judge
- Frank Field, Baron Field of Birkenhead (1942–2024), British politician
