= 1890 Stamford by-election =

UK parliamentary by-election

- March 7, 1890

Stamford constituency
- Turnout: 77.8% (Previous election was unopposed)
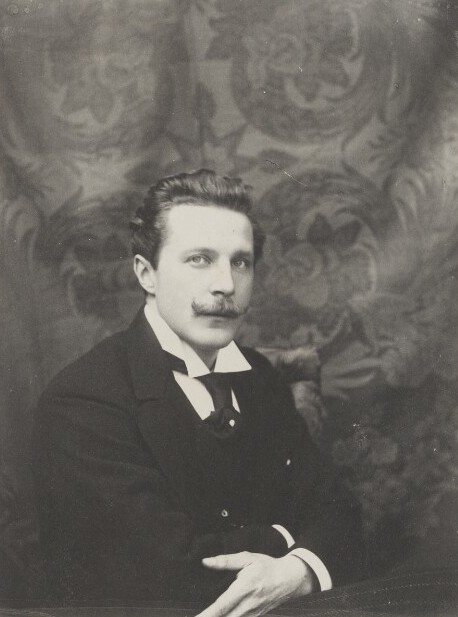

	First party	Second party
Candidate	Harry Cust	Arthur Priestley
Party	Conservative	Liberal
Popular vote	4,236	3,954
Percentage	51.7%	48.3%
MP before election
John Lawrance
Conservative
Elected MP
Harry Cust
Conservative

The 1890 Stamford by-election was held on 7 March 1890, when the incumbent Conservative MP John Lawrance resigned after being appointed a Judge of the Queen's Bench division of the High Court of Justice. The by-election was won by the Conservative Party candidate Henry Cust.

== Result ==
By-election, 7 March 1890: Stamford
Party	Candidate	Votes	%	±%
Conservative	Harry Cust	4,236	51.7	N/A
Liberal	Arthur Priestley	3,954	48.3	New
Majority		282	3.4	N/A
Turnout		8,190	77.8	N/A
Registered electors		10,526		
Conservative hold		Swing	N/A	
