= Maurice Johnson =

Maurice Johnson may refer to:

- Maurice Johnson (English politician) (1480–1551), English politician, Member of the Parliament of England for Stamford 1523–c.1539
- Maurice Johnson (antiquary) (1688–1755), British antiquary
- Maurice Johnson (Canadian politician) (born 1929), Canadian Member of Parliament
- Maurice Johnson (American football) (born 1967), American football player
- Maurice W. Johnson, English chess player
- Maurice Johnson, Jamaican record producer better known as Jack Scorpio

== See also ==
- Morris Johnson (born 1937), criminal
- Maurice Johnston (disambiguation)
