= 1801 Stamford by-election =

UK parliamentary by-election

The 1801 Stamford by-election was held on 16 February 1801, after the seat was vacated when incumbent Whig MP John Proby was raised to the Peerage as Baron Carysfort. The by-election was won by the Tory candidate Albemarle Bertie, who stood unopposed.
