= John Henniker-Major, 2nd Baron Henniker =

British peer and Member of Parliament

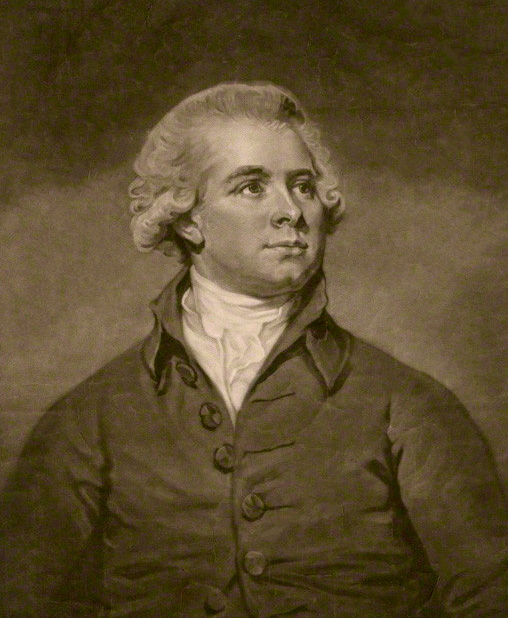
Lord Henniker

John Henniker-Major, 2nd Baron Henniker (19 April 1752 – 4 December 1821) was a British peer and Member of Parliament (MP).

== Biography ==
Henniker was the son of John Henniker, 1st Baron Henniker, and Anne Major. He was educated at Eton and St John's College, Cambridge. He was elected to the House of Commons for New Romney in 1785, a seat he held until 1790, and then represented Steyning from 1794 to 1802. In 1803 he succeeded his father as second Baron Henniker but as this was an Irish peerage it did not entitle him to a seat in the House of Lords. He instead returned to the House of Commons as the representative for Rutland in 1805, which he remained until 1812, and then sat for Stamford between 1812 and 1818. In 1792 he assumed by Royal licence the additional surname of Major. Lord Henniker died in December 1821, aged 69, and was succeeded in his titles by his nephew John.

== Notes ==
Parliament of Great Britain
Preceded by Sir Edward Dering; Richard Atkinson	Member of Parliament for New Romney; 1785–1790; With: Sir Edward Dering 1785–1790; Richard Joseph Sullivan 1787–1790	Succeeded by Richard Joseph Sullivan; Sir Elijah Impey
Preceded by John Curtis; Samuel Whitbread	Member of Parliament for Steyning; 1794–1801; With: Samuel Whitbread 1794–1796; James Martin Lloyd 1796–1801	Succeeded by Parliament of the United Kingdom
Parliament of the United Kingdom
Preceded by Parliament of Great Britain	Member of Parliament for Steyning; 1801–1802; With: James Martin Lloyd	Succeeded by James Martin Lloyd; Robert Hurst
Preceded by Gerard Noel Edwards; Lord Carbery	Member of Parliament for Rutland; 1805–1812; With: Gerard Noel Edwards 1805–1808; Charles Noel Noel 1808–1812	Succeeded by Charles Noel Noel; Sir Gilbert Heathcote
Preceded by Evan Foulkes; Charles Chaplin	Member of Parliament for Stamford; 1812–1818; With: Evan Foulkes	Succeeded by Lord Thomas Cecil; William Henry Percy
Peerage of Ireland
Preceded by John Henniker	Baron Henniker; 1803–1821	Succeeded by John Minet Henniker-Major
