= Robert Johnson (archdeacon of Leicester) =

English clergyman (1540–1625)

Robert Johnson (1540 –23 July 1625) was a Church of England cleric and the founder of both Oakham School and Uppingham School.

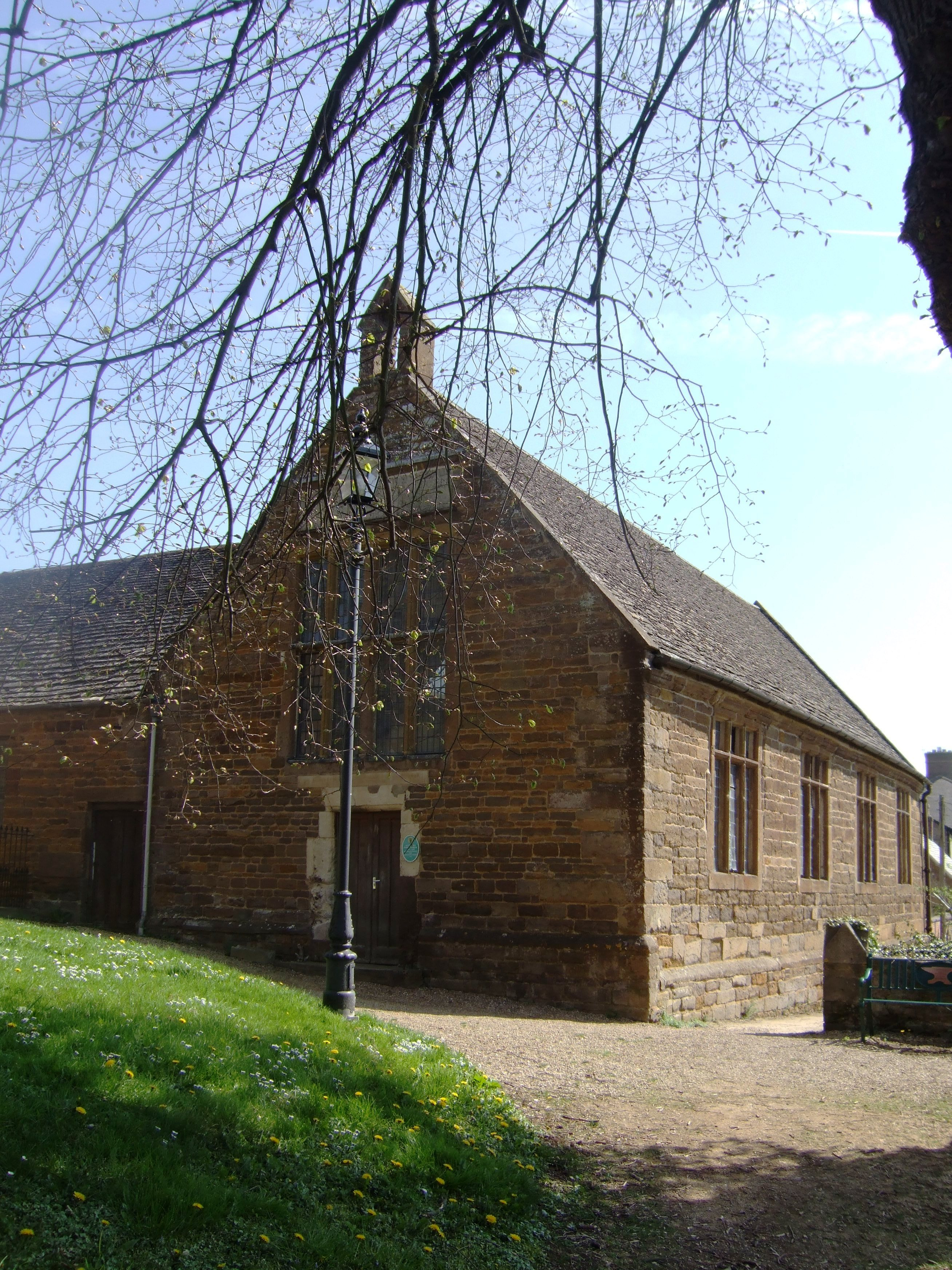
The original school building of Uppingham School

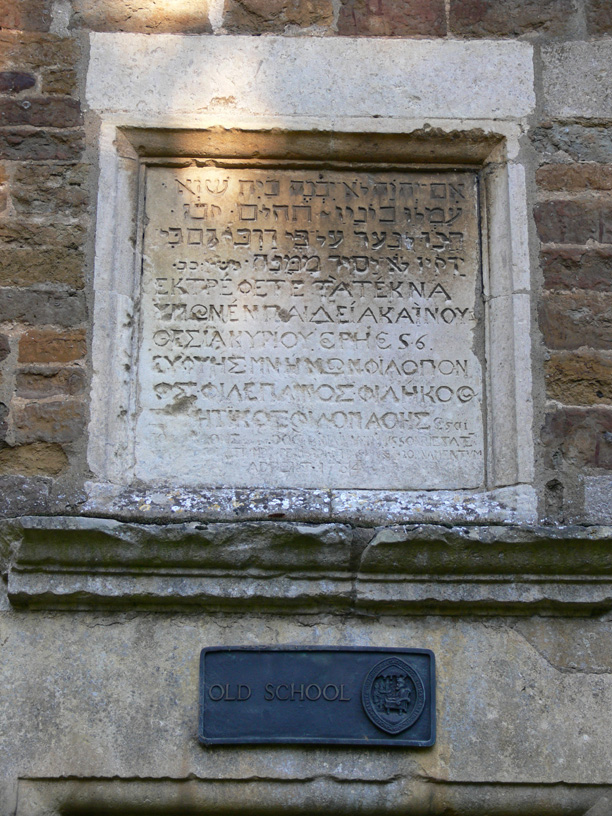
Inscription above the door of the Old School of Oakham School

He was the Puritan rector of North Luffenham, Rutland, for 51 years, from 1574 until his death. He was also Archdeacon of Leicester from 1591 to 1625. He founded free grammar schools in Oakham and Uppingham in 1584.

== Life and career ==
He was born in Stamford to Maurice and Jane Johnson, one of seven children; his father was Member of Parliament for Stamford. He was orphaned at age eleven. He was educated by his guardian uncle Robert Smith, first at Peterborough Grammar School, then at Cambridge University. He matriculated in 1557, on the eve of Queen Elizabeth’s ascension to the throne, and in 1563, was appointed a Fellow of Trinity College, Cambridge.

Johnson was a respected cleric and a popular lecturer. He became the rector of North Luffenham on 15 April 1574, a post he held for over a half a century. Sometime before 1571, he became chaplain for Sir Nicholas Bacon, Lord Keeper of the Great Seal, at Bacon’s Elizabethan mansion of Gorhambury. While there, Johnson possibly tutored Bacon's son, the young Francis Bacon, and met Lord Burghley and Queen Elizabeth. Along with Lord Bacon, their patronage launched his clerical career. He became simultaneously prebendary or canon of four Church of England prebends, those of Windsor, Peterborough, Norwich and Rochester. This collection of endowed benefices made him very wealthy. He founded free grammar schools in Oakham and Uppingham in 1584, as well as other charitable institutions.

Johnson died on 23 July 1625 in North Luffenham. His memorial is in the chancel of the parish church there.

== Charitable works ==
His puritan beliefs meant he placed great importance on education, and he set up the grammar schools in the two towns of Rutland so that those who were too poor to pay for schooling could be taught Hebrew, Greek and Latin.

Among other endowments and foundations, Archdeacon Johnson founded Hospitals of Christ in Oakham and Uppingham, and re-founded and endowed the old hospital of Saint John the Evangelist and Saint Anne in Oakham. The schools and hospitals received their charter from Queen Elizabeth I in 1587. He was also one of the eight founding fellows of Jesus College, Oxford.

A statue of Johnson can be seen on the Victoria Tower of Uppingham School.

== Family ==
Johnson married three times. Through his son Abraham, by his third wife, Maria (née Hird), he had thirteen grandchildren.

=== Witham Hall, Lincolnshire ===
His descendant The Rev. Woolsey Johnson built the Grade II listed Georgian manor house Witham Hall in Lincolnshire (which is mentioned by Nikolaus Pevsner in Buildings of England and now hosts the renowned preparatory Witham Hall School) as a private residence in 1752. Archdeacon Robert Johnson's family resided in the adjacent village of Witham-on-the-Hill, and Witham Hall was inherited by his descendant Lieutenant-General William Augustus Johnson MP.

=== USA settlements ===
His eldest grandson was Isaac Johnson who used his large inheritance to found the Massachusetts Bay Colony expedition of 1630. Three of his other grandsons, John Johnson, Thomas Johnson, and Robert Johnson were among the founders of New Haven, Connecticut. His great-grandson Samuel Johnson founded King's College which is now Columbia University.
