= 1838 Stamford by-election =

UK parliamentary by-election

The 1838 Stamford by-election was held on 1 May 1838, when the incumbent Conservative MP Thomas Chaplin resigned. The by-election was won by the Conservative Party candidate George Clerk, who stood unopposed.
