= Hardgrave =

Hardgrave is a surname. Notable people with the surname include:

- Arthur Hardgrave (fl. 1908–14), New Zealand rugby league player
- Eric Hardgrave (born 1960), American baseball player
- Gary Hardgrave (born 1960), Australian politician
- John Hardgrave (1826–1906), Australian politician
- John Hardgrave (MP), 16th-century English politician

== See also ==
- Hardgrove
