= March 1858 Stamford by-election =

UK parliamentary by-election

The 1858 Stamford by-election was held on 3 March 1858, when the incumbent Conservative MP Frederic Thesiger resigned, following his appointment as Lord Chancellor and elevation to the peerage as the 1st Baron Chelmsford. The by-election was won by the Conservative Party candidate John Inglis who stood unopposed.
