= Maurice Johnston =

Maurice Johnston may refer to:

- Maurice Robert Johnston (1929–2024), British Army general
- Mo Johnston (born 1963), Scottish footballer

== See also ==
- Maurice Johnson (disambiguation)
