= Evan Foulkes =

Evan Foulkes (c. 1751 – 8 November 1825) was a politician in the United Kingdom. He was a member of parliament (MP) from 1807 to 1818.

Parliament of the United Kingdom
Preceded by Sir Arthur Wellesley (later Duke of Wellington)	Member of Parliament for Tralee; 1807	Succeeded by James Stephen
Preceded by John Leland and Albemarle Bertie	Member of Parliament for Stamford; 1807–1818; With: Albemarle Bertie to 1809; Charles Chaplin 1809–1812; The Lord Henniker 1812–1818	Succeeded by Lord Thomas Cecil and William Henry Percy
