= 1852 Stamford by-election =

UK parliamentary by-election

The 1852 Stamford by-election was a Ministerial by-election held on 6 March 1852, after the seat was vacated, upon the appointment of the incumbent Conservative MP John Charles Herries, as President of the Board of Control for India. Herries was re-elected unopposed, by established convention.
