= June 1868 Stamford by-election =

UK parliamentary by-election

The June 1868 Stamford by-election was held on 24 June 1868, when the incumbent Conservative MP Charles Chetwynd-Talbot, Viscount Ingestre became ineligible, having acceded to the Earldom of Shrewsbury, upon the death of his father. The by-election was won by the Conservative Party candidate William Unwin Heygate, who stood unopposed.
