= Marston Clarke Buszard =

English barrister and politician

Buszard in 1880

Marston Clarke Buszard Q.C. (13 July 1837 – 11 September 1921) was an English barrister and a Liberal politician who sat in the House of Commons from 1880 to 1885.

Buszard was born in Lutterworth. Leicestershire, the eldest son of Marston Buszard MD and his wife Sarah Catherine Clarke, eldest daughter of John Clarke of Peatling Hall who was High Sheriff of Leicestershire in 1820. Buszard was educated at Rugby School and at Trinity College, Cambridge, where he was awarded BA 1st Class in Law and 12th senior optime in 1860, the Chancellor's medal for Legal Studies in 1863 and MA and LLM in 1863. He was called to Bar at Inner Temple in 1862 and became Queen's Counsel in 1877 and a Bencher of his Inn in 1880. Buszard was leader of the Midland Circuit for 31 years and was leading counsel to the Post Office on the Midland Circuit.

At the 1874 general election, Buszard stood for Parliament unsuccessfully in Stamford. At the 1880 general election, he was elected Liberal Member of Parliament (MP) for Stamford and held the seat until 1885. At the 1885 general election, when the borough constituency of Stamford was abolished under the Redistribution of Seats Act and the name transferred to a new county division, Buszard stood in Rutland, where he was heavily defeated by the Conservative Party candidate, and in 1886 he stood as a Liberal Unionist Party in Rugby. Without a Conservative candidate, the election was a two-way contest between Buszard and the sitting Liberal MP Henry Peyton Cobb, and Cobb held the seat with a majority of 6.4% over Buszard.

Buszard was Recorder of Derby from 1890 to 1899 and of Leicester in 1899. He was Deputy Chairman of the Quarter Sessions. It was noted that he was "A noted advocate with an unfailing gift for rhythmic language. As administrator of the Criminal Law was opposed to 'sickly humanitarianism and sentimentalism.'"

Buszard married Louisa Threlfall in 1864, second daughter of John Mayor Threlfall of Manchester in 1864. Louisa died in 1895 and Buszard married Annie Violet Whitwell in 1898.

Parliament of the United Kingdom
Preceded by John Dalrymple-Hay	Member of Parliament for Stamford; 1880–1885	Succeeded by John Lawrance
