= George Howard (British Army officer) =

British Army officer and politician (1718–1796)

Field Marshal The Right Honourable Sir George Howard KB
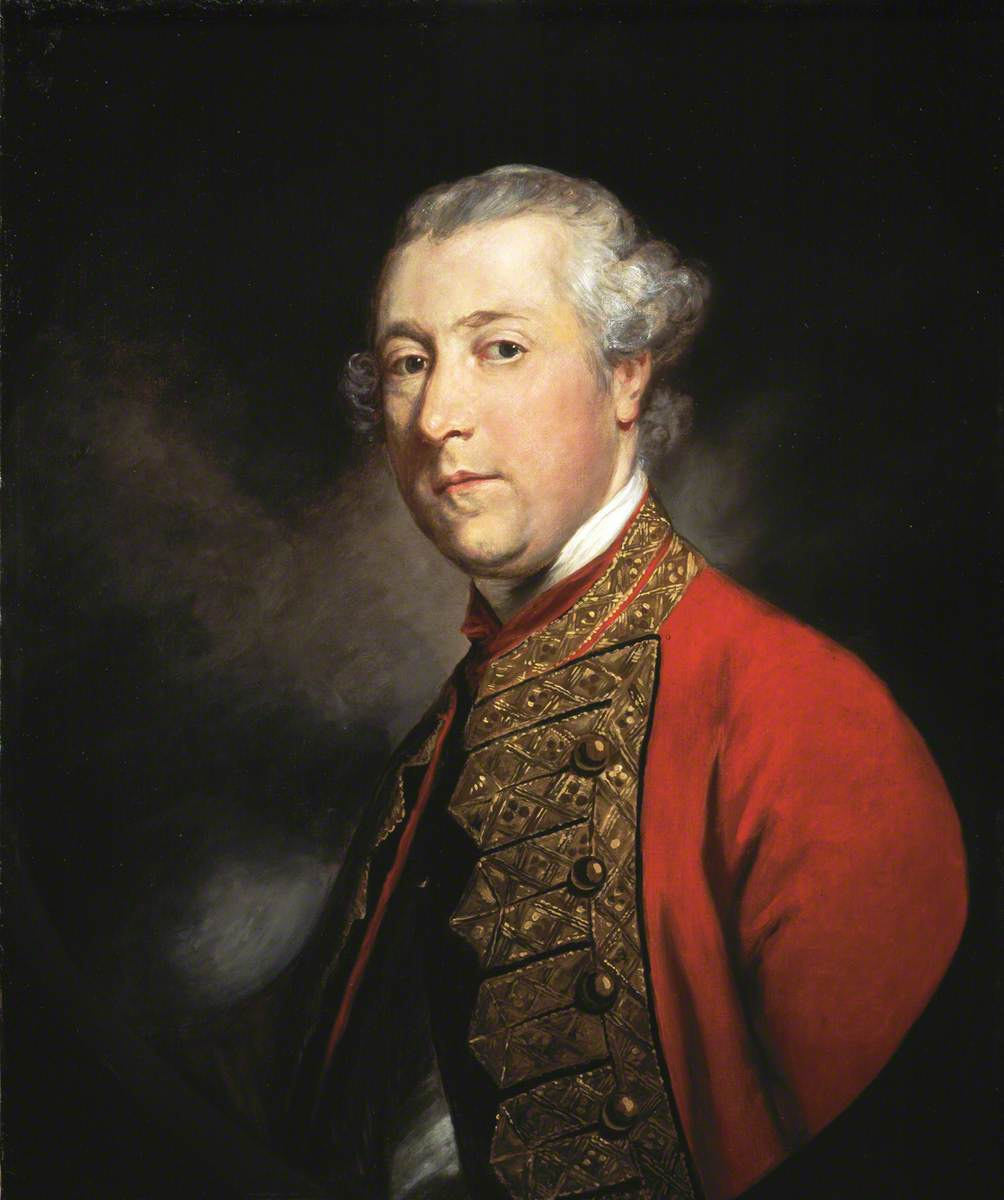
- Portrait by Sir Joshua Reynolds, c. 1770
- Born: 17 June 1718
- Died: 16 July 1796 (aged 78); Grosvenor Square, London
- Burial place: Great Bookham, Surrey
- Military career
- Allegiance: Great Britain
- Branch: British Army
- Service years: 1736–1796
- Rank: Field Marshal
- Commands: 3rd Regiment of Foot
- Conflicts: War of the Austrian Succession; Jacobite Rebellion; Seven Years' War
- Awards: Knight Companion of the Order of the Bath

Field Marshal Sir George Howard KB PC (17 June 1718 – 16 July 1796) was a British Army officer and politician. After commanding the 3rd Regiment of Foot at the Battle of Fontenoy in May 1745 during the War of the Austrian Succession and after commanding that regiment again at the Battle of Falkirk Muir and the Battle of Culloden during the Jacobite Rebellion, he returned to the continent and fought at the Battle of Lauffeld. He went on to command a brigade at the Battle of Warburg during the Seven Years' War. He subsequently became the Governor of Minorca.

== Military career ==
Born the son of Lieutenant General Thomas Howard and his wife Mary Howard (née Moreton, daughter of William Moreton, Bishop of Meath), Howard was educated at Westminster School and Christ Church, Oxford and was commissioned as a lieutenant in his father's regiment (later the 24th Regiment of Foot) in 1736. He was promoted to captain in 1737 and transferred to the 3rd Regiment of Foot in 1739. Promoted to lieutenant colonel on 2 April 1744, he commanded the 3rd Regiment of Foot at the Battle of Fontenoy in May 1745 during the War of the Austrian Succession.

Howard commanded the 3rd Regiment of Foot again, under the Duke of Cumberland, at the Battle of Falkirk Muir in January 1746 and the Battle of Culloden in April 1746 during the Jacobite Rebellion and was accused of treating the defeated Jacobites unduly harshly. He then returned to the continent and fought at the Battle of Lauffeld in July 1747. He succeeded his father as colonel of the 3rd Regiment of Foot in August 1749. He went on to take part in the Raid on Rochefort in September 1757 and, having been promoted to major-general on 24 January 1758, he commanded a brigade, under the Marquess of Granby, at the Battle of Warburg in July 1760 during the Seven Years' War. He was promoted to lieutenant-general on 14 March 1761.

== Political career ==
Howard became Member of Parliament (MP) for Lostwithiel in 1761 and, having been appointed a Knight Companion of the Bath in early 1763, he became colonel of the 7th (The Queen's Own) Regiment of Dragoons in August 1763. He acquired Stoke Place in Buckinghamshire for use as a country home in 1764.

Howard stood down from Parliament and became Governor of Minorca in 1766. After retiring as Governor of Minorca, he became governor of the Royal Hospital Chelsea in February 1768 and was elected as Member of Parliament for Stamford that same year.

Promoted to full general on 6 September 1777, Howard became colonel of the 1st (The King's) Dragoon Guards in April 1779. He was promoted to field marshal on 18 October 1793 and appointed to the honorary post of Governor of Jersey in July 1795. He died at his London home in Grosvenor Square on 16 July 1796 and was buried at Great Bookham in Surrey.

== Family ==
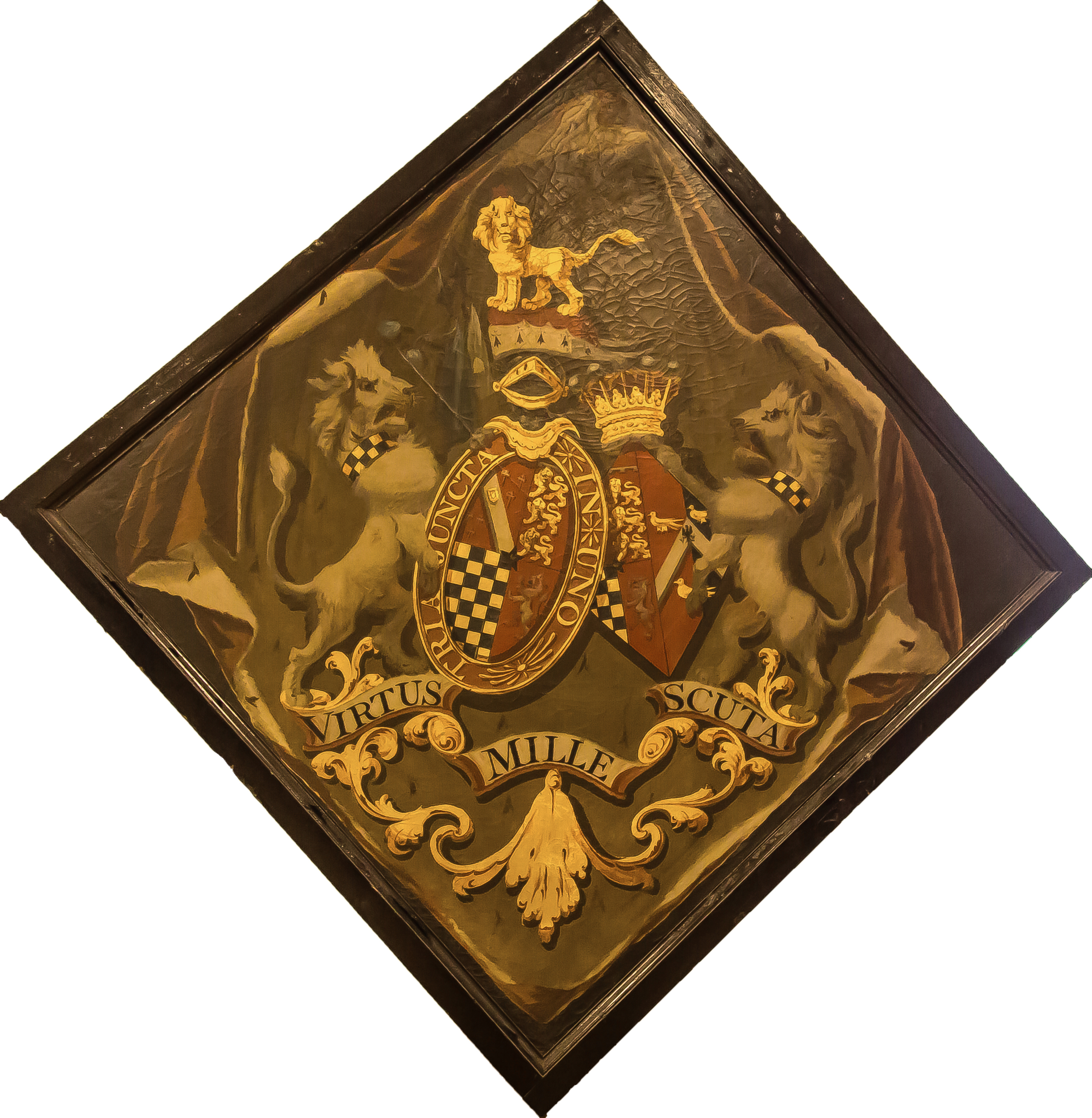
Funeral hatchment in Church of St Giles, Stoke Poges

On 16 February 1747–8, Howard married Lady Lucy Wentworth (sister of William Wentworth, Earl of Strafford), under licence from the Bishop of London, at the King Street Chapel in St James's, Westminster: they had one daughter Anne. After the death of his first wife, Howard married Elizabeth Beckford, the widow of Thomas Howard, 2nd Earl of Effingham; there were no children by the second marriage.

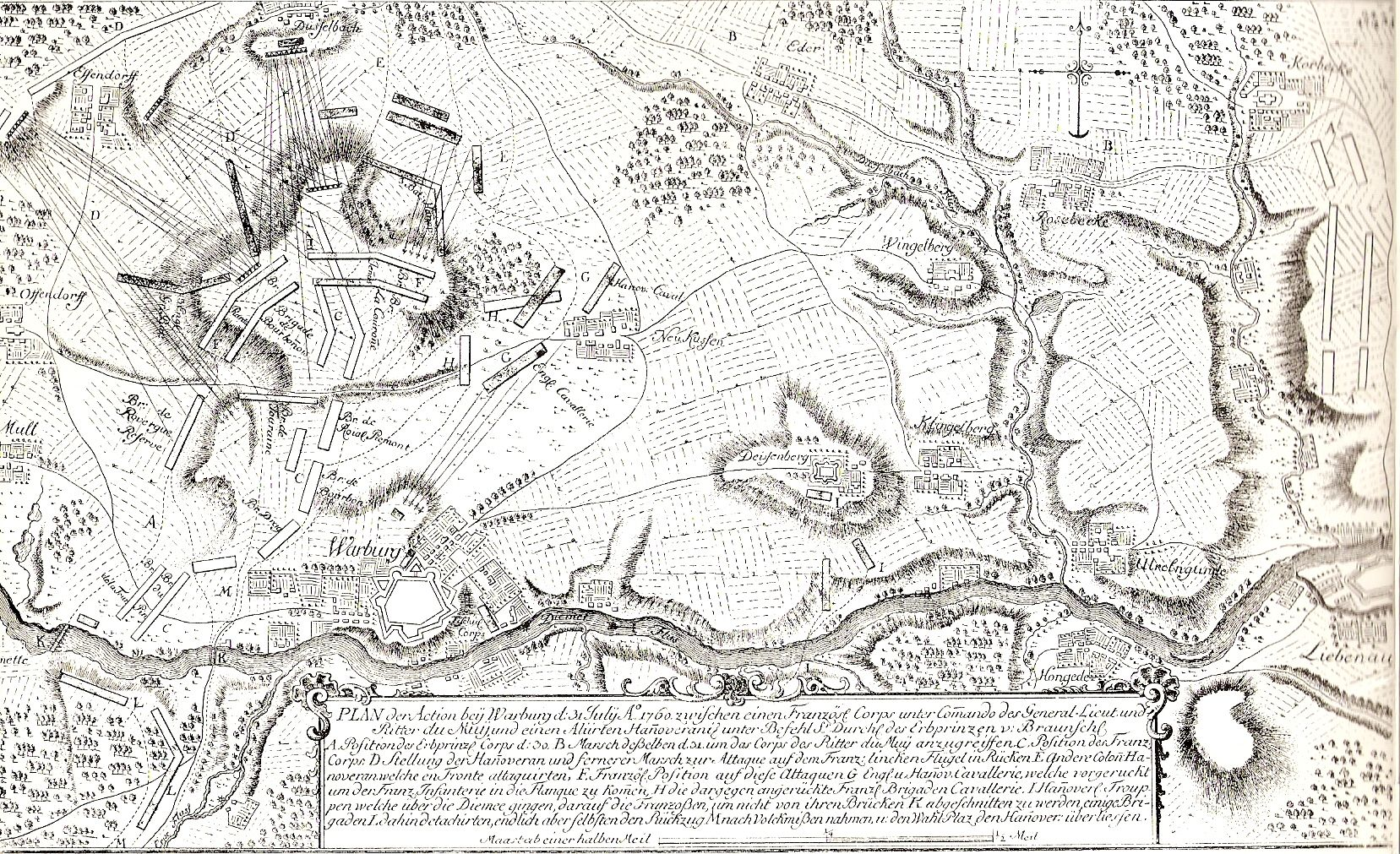
Plan of the Battle of Warburg where Howard led his brigade to victory

== Sources ==
- Heathcote, Tony (1999). The British Field Marshals, 1736–1997: A Biographical Dictionary. Barnsley: Leo Cooper. ISBN 0-85052-696-5.
- "Howard, George (1720?-1796)" . Dictionary of National Biography. London: Smith, Elder & Co. 1885–1900.

Parliament of Great Britain
Preceded by James Edward Colleton; Thomas Clarke	Member of Parliament for Lostwithiel with James Edward Colleton; 1761–1766	Succeeded by James Edward Colleton; Viscount Beauchamp
Preceded by George Bridges Brudenell; George René Aufrère	Member of Parliament for Stamford with George René Aufrère 1768–1774; Henry Cecil 1774–1790; The Earl of Carysfort 1790–1796; 1768–1796	Succeeded by The Earl of Carysfort; John Leland
Military offices
Preceded by Thomas Howard	Colonel of the 3rd Regiment of Foot; 1749–1763	Succeeded by John Craufurd
Preceded by John Mostyn	Colonel of the 7th (The Queen's Own) Regiment of Dragoons; 1763–1779	Succeeded by Sir Henry Clinton
Preceded by John Mostyn	Colonel of the 1st (The King's) Dragoon Guards; 1779–1796	Succeeded by Sir William Augustus Pitt
Preceded by Richard Lyttelton	Governor of Minorca; 1766–1768	Succeeded by John Mostyn
Honorary titles
Preceded by Sir Robert Rich	Governor, Royal Hospital Chelsea; 1768–1795	Succeeded by The Marquess Townshend
