= July 1858 Stamford by-election =

UK parliamentary by-election

The 1858 Stamford by-election was held on 17 July 1858, when the incumbent Conservative MP John Inglis resigned, following his appointment as Lord Justice Clerk with the Scottish judicial title of Lord Glencorse. The by-election was won by the Conservative Party candidate Stafford Northcote, who stood unopposed.
