= May 1868 Stamford by-election =

UK parliamentary by-election

The May 1868 Stamford by-election was held on 4 May 1868, when the incumbent Conservative MP Robert Gasgoyne-Cecil, Viscount Cranbourne became ineligible, having acceded to the Marquess of Salisbury, upon the death of his father. The by-election was won by the Conservative Party candidate Charles Chetwynd-Talbot, Viscount Ingestre, who stood unopposed.
