= Thomas Chaplin (MP for Stamford) =

British politician and Army officer

Thomas Chaplin (17 April 1794 – 10 May 1863) was a British politician and Army officer.

The son of Charles Chaplin, Thomas lived in Blankney in Lincolnshire. He was appointed as a captain in the Coldstream Guards, and also became a lieutenant-colonel. He served overseas in the Peninsular War, but was seriously injured at the Siege of San Sebastián in 1813, and receiving a pension of £50.

At the 1826 UK general election, Chaplin stood for the Conservative Party in Stamford, winning the seat, and holding it in 1830. He was defeated in the 1831 UK general election, but regained his seat in 1832, holding it until 1838, when he resigned by accepting the Chiltern Hundreds. Unusually for a Conservative, he supported the replacement of the Assessed Taxes by a property tax.

Parliament of the United Kingdom
Preceded by Thomas Cecil; William Henry Percy	Member of Parliament for Stamford; 1826–1831; With: Thomas Cecil	Succeeded by Thomas Cecil; Charles Tennyson
Preceded by Thomas Cecil; Charles Tennyson	Member of Parliament for Stamford; 1832–1838; With: George Finch 1832–1837; Charles Manners 1837–1838	Succeeded by George Clerk; Charles Manners
