= Hardgrove =

Hardgrove is a surname. Notable people with the surname include:

- John Hardgrove (1836–1928), American politician
- Joseph H. Hardgrove (1870–1953), American physician
- Pat Hardgrove (1895–1973), American baseball player

== See also ==
- Hardgrove Grindability Index
- Hardgrave
