= 1845 Stamford by-election =

UK parliamentary by-election

The 1845 Stamford by-election was a Ministerial by-election held on 10 February 1845, after the seat was vacated, upon the appointment of the incumbent Conservative MP George Clerk, as Master of the Mint. Clerk was re-elected unopposed, by established convention.
