= 1853 Stamford by-election =

UK parliamentary by-election

The 1853 Stamford by-election was held on 17 July 1853, when the incumbent Conservative MP John Charles Herries resigned due to ill health. The by-election was won by the Conservative Party candidate and future Prime Minister, Robert Gasgoyne-Cecil, who stood unopposed.
