= Charles Chaplin (younger) =

British politician (1786–1859)

Charles Chaplin (21 April 1786 – 24 May 1859) was an English Member of Parliament (MP). He represented Stamford from 1809 to 1812 and Lincolnshire from 1818 to 1831.

Parliament of the United Kingdom
Preceded by Albemarle Bertie and Evan Foulkes	Member of Parliament for Stamford; 1809–1812; With: Evan Foulkes	Succeeded by The Lord Henniker and Evan Foulkes
Preceded by Charles Anderson-Pelham and William Cust	Member of Parliament for Lincolnshire; 1818–1831; With: Charles Anderson-Pelham, to 1823; Sir William Amcotts-Ingilby, from 1823	Succeeded by Sir William Amcotts-Ingilby and Charles Anderson-Pelham, 2nd
