= John Hardgrave (MP) =

16th-century English politician

John Hargrave (by 1499 – 1541 or later) was an English politician.

He was a member (MP) of the parliament of England for Stamford in 1529.
