= John Proby, 1st Earl of Carysfort =

British politician and judge

The Right Honourable The Earl of Carysfort KP PC PC (Ire) FRS
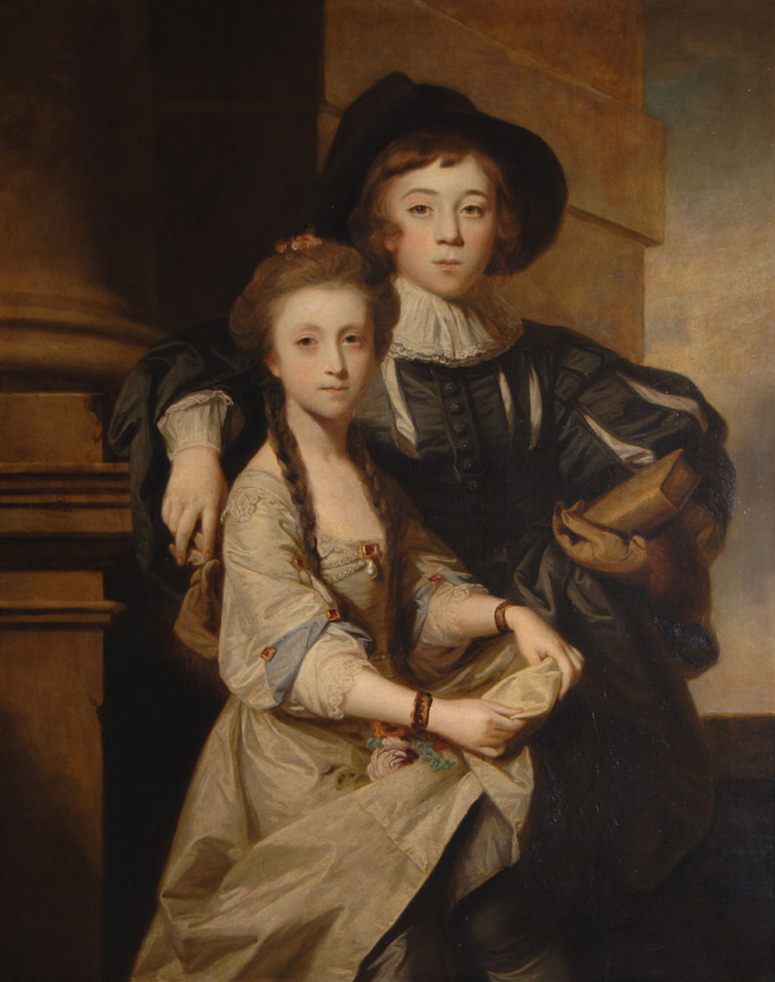
- Portrait by Sir Joshua Reynolds, 1765

Joint Master of the Rolls in Ireland (with the Earl of Glandore)
- In office 1789–1801
- Monarch: George III
- Preceded by: The Duke of Leinster
- Succeeded by: Michael Smith

Joint Postmaster General (with the Earl of Buckinghamshire)
- In office 1806–1807
- Monarch: George III
- Prime Minister: The Lord Grenville
- Preceded by: The Duke of Montrose; Lord Charles Spencer
- Succeeded by: The Earl of Chichester; The Earl of Sandwich

Personal details
- Born: 12 August 1751
- Died: 7 April 1828 (aged 76) Upper Grosvenor Street, London
- Party: Whig
- Spouse(s): (1) Elizabeth Osborne (d. 1783) (2) Elizabeth Grenville (1756-1842)
- Education: Trinity College, Cambridge

Arms of Proby: Ermine, on a fess gules a lion passant or

John Joshua Proby, 1st Earl of Carysfort, KP, PC, PC (Ire), FRS (12 August 1751 – 7 April 1828) was a British judge, diplomat, Whig politician and poet.

== Background and education ==
Carysfort was the son of John Proby, 1st Baron Carysfort, and the Hon. Elizabeth, daughter of Joshua Allen, 2nd Viscount Allen. He was educated at Westminster School and Trinity College, Cambridge.

== Political and judicial career ==
Carysfort succeeded his father as second Baron in 1772. He was elected a Fellow of the Royal Society in 1779 and made a Knight of the Order of St Patrick in 1784. In 1789 he was admitted to the Irish Privy Council, created Earl of Carysfort in the Peerage of Ireland and appointed Joint Master of the Rolls in Ireland, which he remained until 1801. The office was then generally regarded as a sinecure. In February 1790 he was returned to the House of Commons for East Looe, a seat he held until June the same year, and then represented Stamford until 1801. He was also Envoy to Berlin between 1800 and 1802. On 18 February 1793, he was appointed a deputy lieutenant of Northamptonshire.

In 1801 he was created Baron Carysfort, of the Hundred of Norman Cross in the County of Huntingdon, in the Peerage of the United Kingdom, which gave him a seat in the British House of Lords. He served as a Commissioner of the Board of Control and as Joint Postmaster General under Lord Grenville from 1806 to 1807 and was sworn of the British Privy Council in 1806.

In 1810 Carysfort published Dramatic and Narrative Poems.

== Family ==
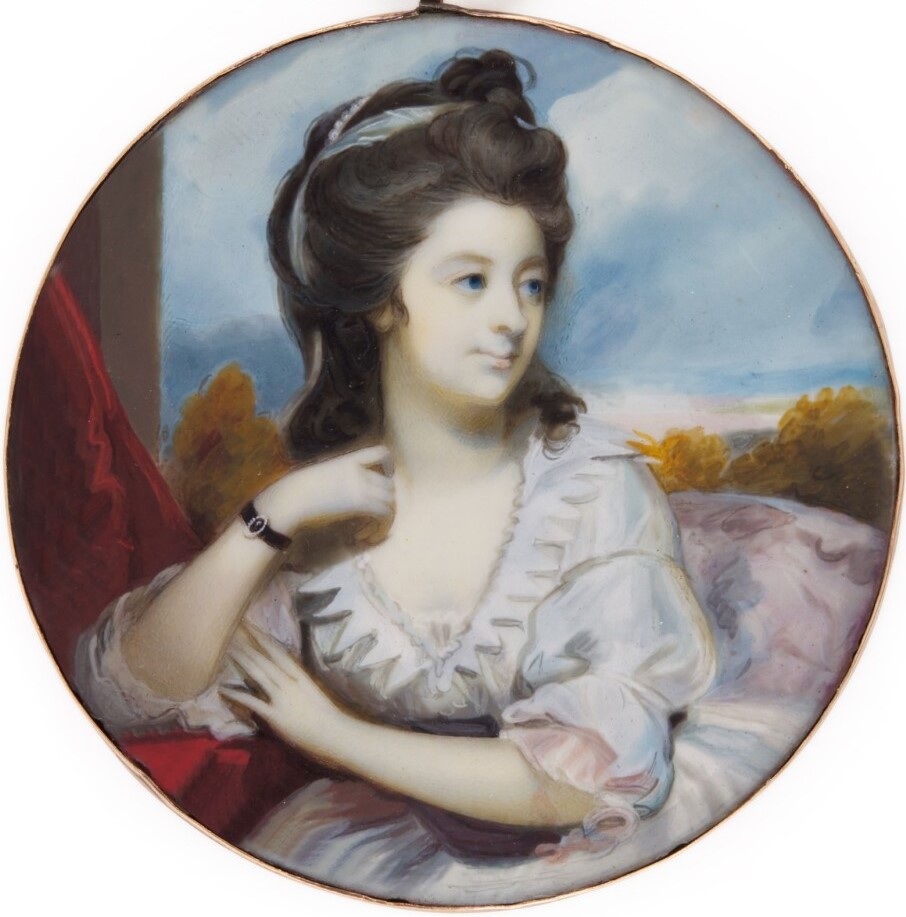
The Earl's first wife, Elizabeth née Osbourne (James Nixon, c. 1780)

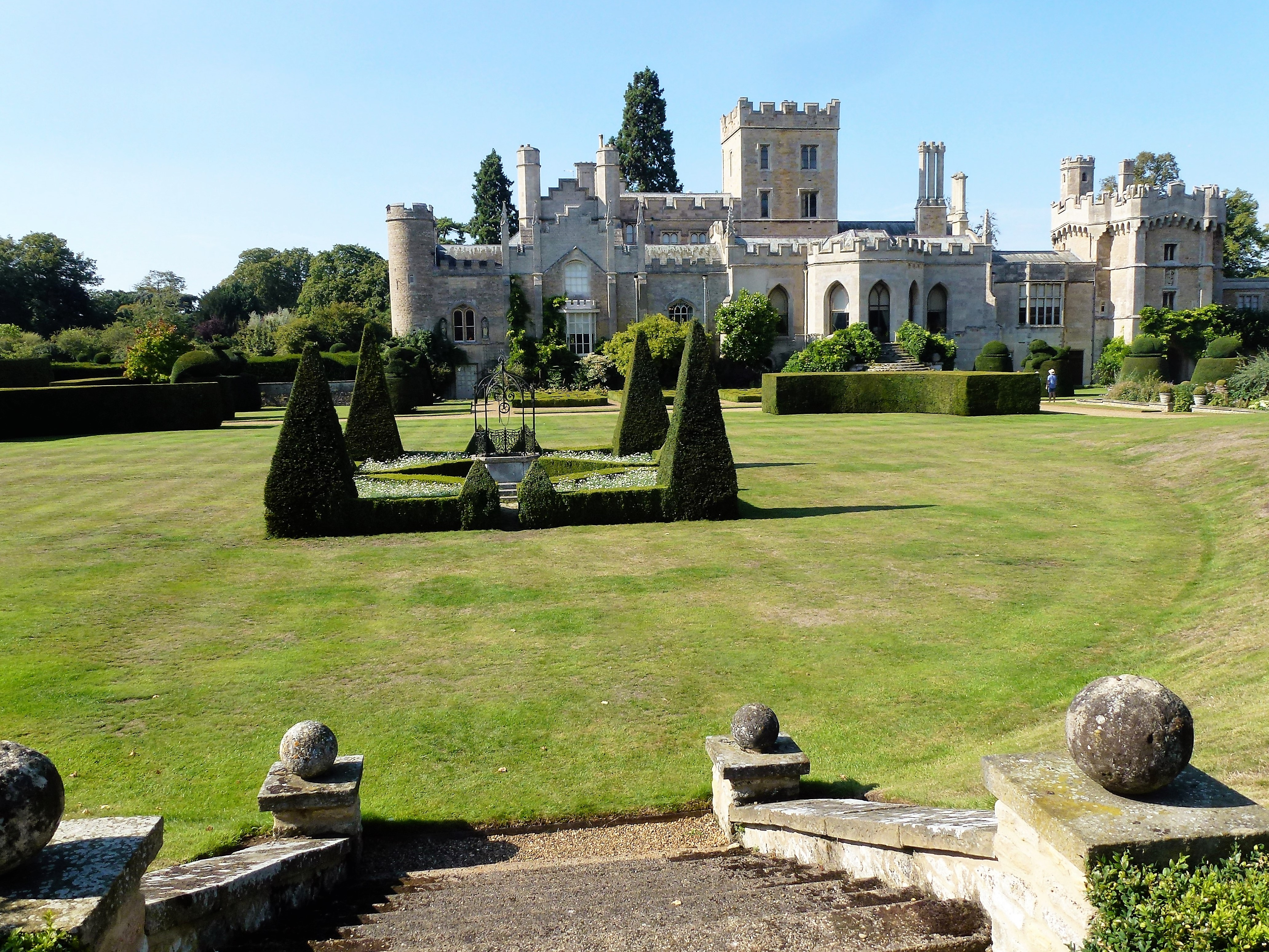
Elton Hall

Lord Carysfort lived at Elton Hall, Huntingdonshire, which he inherited from his father. He married, firstly, Elizabeth Osbourne, daughter of Sir William Osborne, 8th Baronet, in 1774. They had three sons and one daughter. After Elizabeth's early death in 1783 he married, secondly, Elizabeth Grenville, daughter of Prime Minister George Grenville, in 1787. They had three daughters. Lord Carysfort died in April 1828, aged 76, and was predeceased by his eldest son, William, being succeeded in his titles by his second but eldest surviving son John. Lady Carysfort died in December 1842, aged 86.

Parliament of Great Britain
| Preceded by Alexander Irvine; Viscount Belgrave | Member of Parliament for East Looe; 1790; With: Viscount Belgrave | Succeeded by Hon. William Wellesley-Pole; Robert Wood |
| Preceded by Sir George Howard; Henry Cecil | Member of Parliament for Stamford; 1790 – 1801; With: Sir George Howard 1790–1796; John Leland 1796–1801 | Succeeded by Parliament of the United Kingdom |
Parliament of the United Kingdom
| Preceded by Parliament of Great Britain | Member of Parliament for Stamford; 1801; With: John Leland | Succeeded by John Leland; Albemarle Bertie |
Diplomatic posts
| Preceded by The Earl of Elgin | British Minister to Prussia; 1800 – 1802 | Succeeded by Francis James Jackson |
Political offices
| Preceded by The Duke of Leinster | Master of the Rolls in Ireland; 1789 – 1801; With: The Earl of Glandore | Succeeded by Michael Smith |
| Preceded by The Duke of Montrose; Lord Charles Spencer | Joint Postmaster General; 1806 – 1807; With: The Earl of Buckinghamshire | Succeeded by The Earl of Chichester; The Earl of Sandwich |
Peerage of Ireland
| New creation | Earl of Carysfort; 1789 – 1828 | Succeeded by John Proby |
| Preceded by John Proby | Baron Carysfort; 1772 – 1828 | Succeeded by John Proby |
Peerage of the United Kingdom
| New creation | Baron Carysfort; 1801 – 1828 | Succeeded by John Proby |
