= Maurice Johnson (English politician) =

Member of the Parliament of England

Maurice Johnson (ca. 1480–1551) was MP for Stamford and a prominent member of society in Stamford, Lincolnshire in the 16th century, serving in three consecutive parliaments of England.

== Biography ==
Born about 1480, Johnson served as Constable of Stamford from 1507 to 1508, as Chamberlain from 1508 to 1509, as a member of the Second Twelve from 1508 to 1512, a member of the First Twelve from 1512 until his death, and as Alderman (Mayor) from 1517 to 1518, 1527–1528, and 1538–1539. He served in three parliaments, being returned in 1523, 1529 and 1536.

A dyer by trade, Johnson was married to Jane Lacy, daughter of Henry Lacy who also served in the parliament of 1536.

After his death in 1551 he was buried at All Hallows, Stamford.

Johnson's youngest son Robert (1540–1625) became Canon of Windsor in 1572 and Archdeacon of Leicester in 1591.
