= John Leland (British Army officer) =

Irish-born British Army general (17??-1808)

John Leland (died 3 January 1808) was a General in the British Army and Member of Parliament serving in the House of Commons of Great Britain (later, the House of Commons of the United Kingdom)

He was born the son of Ralph Leland of Dublin. He inherited Strood Park in Sussex from his wife Anne Upton's uncle Edward Cowper.

He joined the Army and became a captain (1755) and then major (1762) in the 58th Foot. He transferred to the 1st Foot Guards and was a captain, lieutenant-colonel (1774) and brigadier-general (in America) (1779). He was made colonel of the soon to be disbanded 80th Regiment of Foot (Royal Edinburgh Volunteers) in 1783 and elevated to major-general in 1787. In 1790 he was awarded the colonelcy of the 64th Foot, promoted lieutenant-general in 1797 and made full general in 1802. He had been with General Wolfe at Quebec in 1759 and in the West Indies in 1762.

He was elected to Parliament to represent the Stamford constituency from 1796 until his death in 1808. He was also Lieutenant-governor of Cork from 1796 until his death.

He died in 1808, having sold Strood Park. He had married Anne, daughter of Richard Upton, a ships master, but had no children.

Military offices
Preceded by John Pomeroy	Colonel of the 64th (2nd Staffordshire) Regiment of Foot; 1790–1808	Succeeded by William Anne Vilettes
Preceded by Sir William Erskine of Torrie, Bt.	Colonel of the 80th Regiment of Foot (Royal Edinburgh Volunteers); 1783	Succeeded by Regiment disbanded
Parliament of the United Kingdom
Preceded by Sir George Howard	Member of Parliament for Stamford; 1796–1808; With: Albemarle Bertie 1801–1808; John Proby 1796–1801	Succeeded by Evan Foulkes
