= Harry Cust =

British politician (1861–1917)

Henry Cust
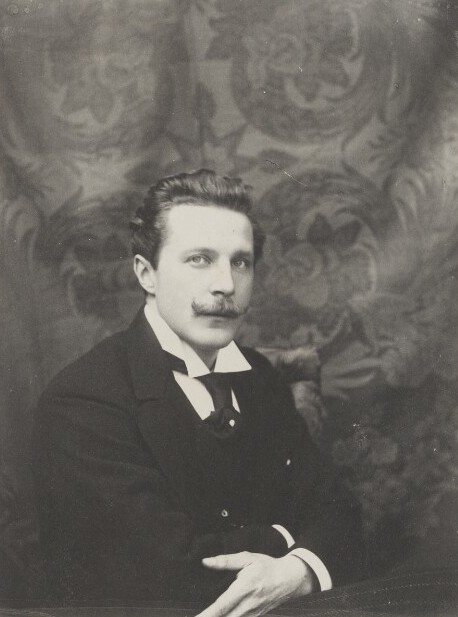
- Harry Cust, photograph by Cyril Flower
- Born: Henry John Cockayne Cust; 10 October 1861; London, England
- Died: 2 March 1917 (aged 55); London, England
- Education: Trinity College, Cambridge
- Occupations: Politician and editor
- Spouse: Emmeline Mary Elizabeth (Nina) Welby-Gregory (1893–1917)
- Children: Lady Diana Manners (illegitimate daughter)
- Parent(s): Henry Cockayne-Cust; Sara Jane Cookson
- Relatives: Adelbert Brownlow-Cust, 3rd Earl Brownlow (2nd cousin)

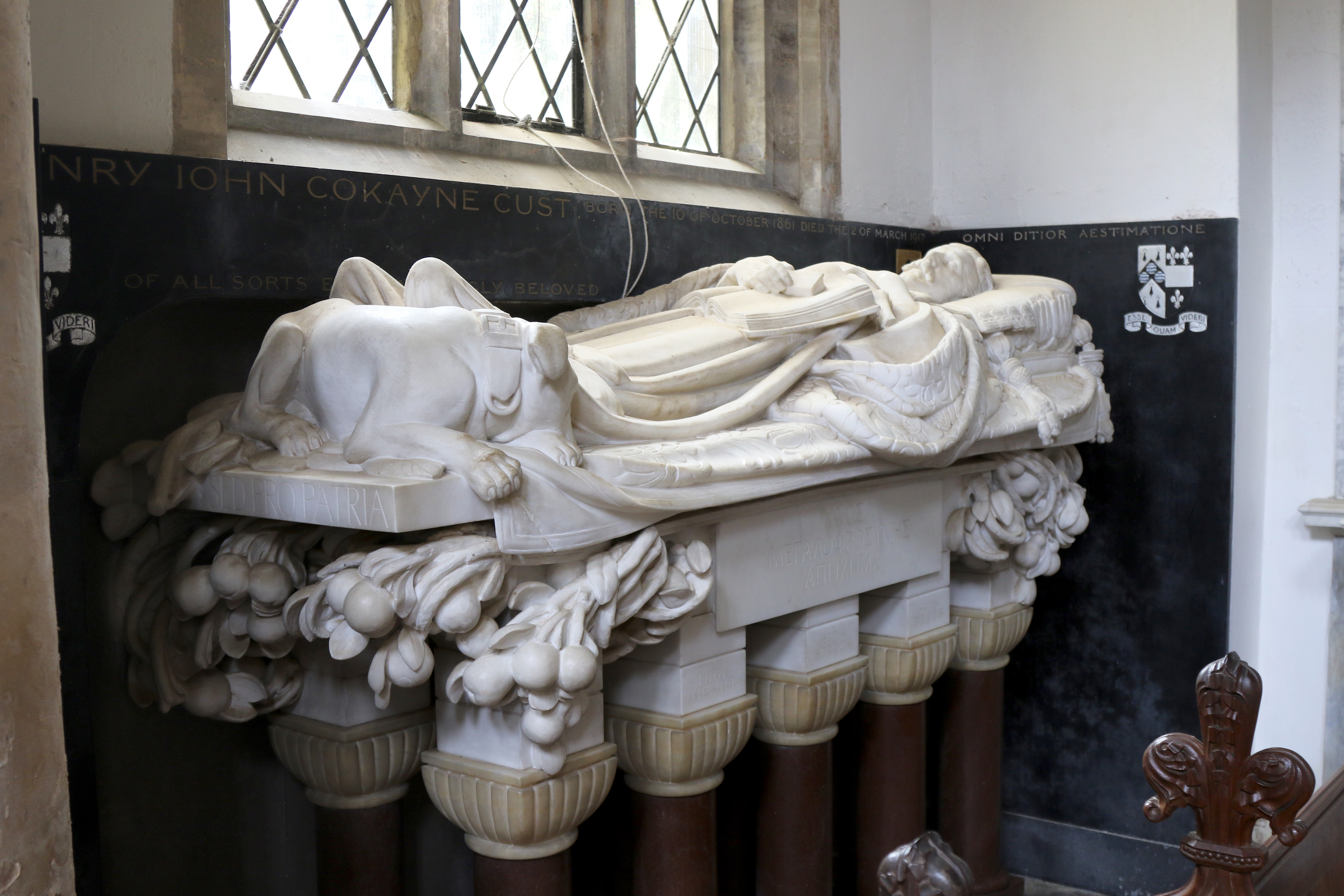
Marble monument with recumbent effigy of Harry Cust, sculpted by his widow "Nina" Welby-Gregory, who was an artist. Arms of Cust impaling Welby on wall. St Peter and St Paul's Church, Belton, South Kesteven

Arms of Cust: Ermine, on a chevron sable three fountains proper

Henry John Cockayne-Cust, JP, DL (10 October 1861 – 2 March 1917) was an English politician and editor who served as a Member of Parliament (MP) for the Unionist Party.

== Origins ==
He was a son of Henry Cockayne-Cust, a younger grandson of Brownlow Cust, 1st Baron Brownlow, of Belton House near Grantham in Lincolnshire, by his wife Sara Jane Cookson.

== Career ==
Cust received his education at Eton College where he served as captain of the Oppidans. He later attended Trinity College, Cambridge, where he graduated with a Bachelor of Arts and second-class honours in the Classical Tripos. Cust initially pursued a career in law and was admitted to the Inner Temple in 1888, but he ultimately decided to enter politics. He won a by-election for Stamford, Lincolnshire in 1890 and served in Parliament until the general election of 1895. He later won a seat in the constituency of Bermondsey in Surrey in 1900 and served until 1906. During this time, he also served as a Justice of the Peace for Bedfordshire and Lincolnshire, as well as Deputy Lieutenant of Bedfordshire.

Cust was a member of The Souls, a prominent social group in late-Victorian England. He was romantically involved with Pamela Wyndham, who later married Edward Tennant, 1st Baron Glenconner. Other members of the group included Margot Asquith, Arthur Balfour, George Curzon, 1st Marquess Curzon, Alfred Lyttelton, Godfrey Webb, and George Wyndham. Cust was known for his exceptional conversational skills and had a reputation as a womanizer. He was also rumoured to be the biological father of Lady Diana Cooper, a socialite and philanthropist, by his mistress Violet Manners, Duchess of Rutland, although this was not acknowledged until much later. There were also rumors that he may have been the biological grandfather of former British Prime Minister Margaret Thatcher, through his supposed illegitimate begetting of her mother Beatrice Ethel Stephenson. Although there was no solid proof of this connection, Lady Diana Cooper often jokingly referred to Mrs Thatcher as her niece.

In 1892, Cust was invited by William Waldorf Astor to edit the Pall Mall Gazette, despite having no prior experience in journalism. Cust quickly transformed the newspaper into the best evening journal of the period, largely due to his success in securing contributions from prominent writers such as Rudyard Kipling and H. G. Wells. However, Cust rejected contributions submitted by Astor himself, who had literary aspirations. This, along with political disagreements, led to Cust's dismissal in February 1896.

After leaving the Pall Mall Gazette, Cust continued his career as an author, writing several poems including "Non nobis". During World War I, Cust was active in propaganda efforts on behalf of the British Government. In August 1914, he founded the Central Committee for National Patriotic Organizations.

== Death ==
He died in 1917 of a heart attack at his home in Hyde Park Gate, London. As the most senior male relative of his childless second cousin Adelbert Brownlow-Cust, 3rd Earl Brownlow, 3rd Viscount Alford, 4th Baron Brownlow, 7th Baronet (1844–1921), he had been the heir presumptive to the barony of Brownlow, the Cust baronetcy and to the extensive Cust estates centred on Belton House. However, as he predeceased the 3rd Earl by three years, the inheritance fell to his surviving younger brother Adelbert Cockayne-Cust, 5th Baron Brownlow, 8th Baronet (1867–1927).

A detailed look at Cust's life is found in Tangled Souls: Love and Scandal among the Victorian Aristocracy (2022) by Jane Dismore.

== Marriage ==
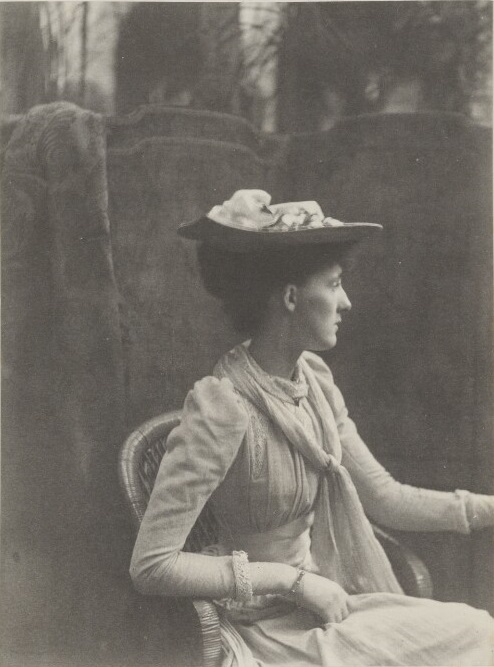
Emmeline "Nina" Welby-Gregory (1867–1955), wife of Harry Cust. 1890s portrait by Cyril Flower

As the result of a purported pregnancy, he married on 11 October 1893 Emmeline Mary Elizabeth Welby-Gregory (1867 – 29 September 1955), known as Nina, a daughter of Sir William Welby-Gregory, 4th Baronet by his wife Victoria Stuart-Wortley. The pregnancy was either false or a misrepresentation, and the couple, whose marriage was thereafter contentious, did not have any children. Nina Cust was an artist and a translator and editor of her mother's papers. She and her husband are buried together at St Peter and St Paul's Church, Belton in an elaborate white marble monument with a recumbent effigy of Harry Cust, sculpted by her. Nina and Harry's relationship is at the centre of the book Tangled Souls: Love and Scandal among the Victorian Aristocracy by Jane Dismore (see Further Reading).

=== Illegitimate descendants ===
==== Lady Diana Cooper ====
His best-known lovechild was the socialite Lady Diana Cooper (1892-1986), legally the daughter of Henry Manners, 8th Duke of Rutland. Internationally famous for her beauty, she married the politician Duff Cooper in 1919.

==== Lady Thatcher (rumoured) ====
A long-standing rumour has held that Cust had an affair with a servant at Belton House called Phoebe Stephenson, who consequently gave birth to a daughter named Beatrice, who having married Alfred Roberts, a grocer in nearby Grantham, became the mother of Margaret Thatcher, Prime Minister of the United Kingdom. In the 1980s, the very elderly Diana Cooper referred to Thatcher as "my niece, the Prime Minister".

==== Others ====
Anita Leslie, in her book Marlborough House Set, implies that Cust had many more children by aristocratic mistresses: Leslie writes—

So much of the Cust strain entered England's peerage that from such a number of cradles there gazed babies with eyes like large sapphires instead of the black boot buttons of their legal fathers.

== Legacy ==
- An annual Cust Lecture "on some important current topic relating to the British Empire" was endowed in the University of Nottingham to commemorate his work.
- His Occasional Poems appeared in 1918, printed in Jerusalem.

== Footnotes ==
Parliament of the United Kingdom
Preceded by John Lawrance	Member of Parliament for Stamford; 1890–1895	Succeeded by William Younger
Preceded by Alfred Lafone	Member of Parliament for Bermondsey; 1900–1906	Succeeded by George Cooper
Media offices
Preceded by Edward Tyas Cook	Editor of The Pall Mall Gazette; 1892–1896	Succeeded by Douglas Straight
