= Sir John Dalrymple-Hay, 3rd Baronet =

Royal Navy Admiral (1821–1912)

Admiral The Right Honourable Sir John Dalrymple-Hay GCB Bt
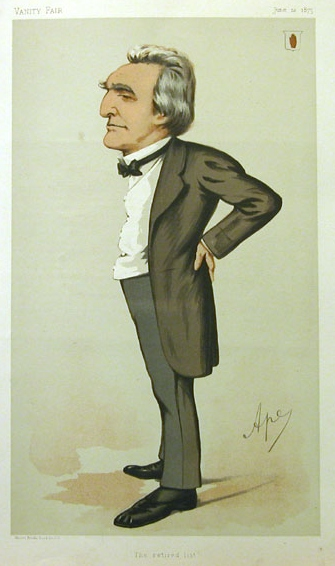
- "The retired list" Dalrymple-Hay as caricatured by Ape (Carlo Pellegrini) in Vanity Fair, June 1875
- Born: 11 February 1821; Edinburgh, Scotland
- Died: 28 January 1912 (aged 90); London, England
- Military career
- Allegiance: United Kingdom
- Branch: Royal Navy
- Service years: 1834–1878
- Rank: Admiral
- Commands: HMS Indus; HMS Hannibal; HMS Victory; HMS Columbine
- Conflicts: Sixth Xhosa War; Oriental Crisis; Battle of Tysami; Battle of Tonkin River; Crimean War
- Awards: Knight Grand Cross of the Order of the Bath

Admiral Sir John Charles Dalrymple-Hay, 3rd Baronet, GCB, PC (11 February 1821 – 28 January 1912) was a Royal Navy officer and politician.

== Early life ==
Born in Edinburgh, Hay-Dalrymple was the only child of Sir James Dalrymple Hay, 2nd Baronet, by his first wife Elizabeth, daughter of Lieutenant-General Sir John Shaw Heron-Maxwell, 4th Baronet. His mother died in childbirth. His father remarried in 1823 and had a further eight children. He was educated at Rugby School, and succeeded to the baronetcy on 19 March 1861.

== Naval career ==
Dalrymple-Hay entered the Royal Navy in 1834. During his naval career he was involved in the Sixth Xhosa War in South Africa and the Oriental Crisis in Syria, being present when Beirut and St Jean d'Acre fell. He was also concerned with successful operations against Chinese pirates in the 1840s.

Dalrymple-Hay commanded HMS Victory from 1854 and then commanded HMS Hannibal during the Crimean War, and was decorated by the British and Turkish governments. He was promoted to captain in 1850 and commanded HMS Indus from 1856. He was promoted to rear admiral in 1866, before retiring as an admiral in March 1878. He was Fourth Naval Lord from 1866 to 1868.

Following the succession of King Edward VII, Dalrymple-Hay was among several retired admirals advanced to Knight Grand Cross of the Order of the Bath (GCB) in the 1902 Coronation Honours list published on 26 June 1902, and received the insignia in an investiture on board the royal yacht Victoria and Albert outside Cowes on 15 August 1902, the day before the fleet review held there to mark the coronation.

== Political career ==
Dalrymple-Hay was a Conservative politician. He served as a member of parliament (MP) for Wakefield 1862–1865. He lost an election at Tiverton on 28 February 1866. He represented Stamford 1866–1880. In 1880-1885 Admiral Hay was the MP for Wigtown Burghs. He was made a privy counsellor in 1874.

== Family ==
Dalrymple-Hay married the Hon. Eliza Napier, daughter of William John Napier, 9th Lord Napier of Merchistoun, in 1847. They had three sons and six daughters. Lady Dalrymple-Hay died in 1901. Dalrymple-Hay survived her by eleven years and died in January 1912, aged 90. He was succeeded in the baronetcy by his second but eldest surviving son, William.

== Works ==
- Memorandum: Rear-Admiral Sir John C. Dalrymple Hay's compulsory retirement from the British Navy (1st ed.), London: Edward Stanford, 1870, Wikidata Q28031289

== Sources ==
- O'Byrne, William Richard (1849). "Hay, John Charles Dalrymple" . A Naval Biographical Dictionary . John Murray – via Wikisource.

Military offices
Preceded by Sir James Drummond	Fourth Naval Lord; 1866–1868	Succeeded by Lord John Hay (As Junior Naval Lord)
Parliament of the United Kingdom
Preceded by William Henry Leatham	Member of Parliament for Wakefield; 1862–1865	Succeeded by William Henry Leatham
Preceded by Viscount Cranborne; Sir Stafford Nortcote	Member of Parliament for Stamford; 1866–1880; With: Viscount Cranborne to 1868; Viscount Ingestre 1868; William Unwin Heygate 1868	Succeeded by Marston Clarke Buszard
Preceded by Mark Stewart	Member of Parliament for Wigtown Burghs; 1880–1885	Constituency abolished
Baronetage of Great Britain
Preceded by James Dalrymple-Hay	Baronet (of Park Place); 1861–1912	Succeeded by William Archibald Dalrymple-Hay
