= John Lawrance =

English judge and politician (1832–1912)

The Right Honourable Sir John Lawrance
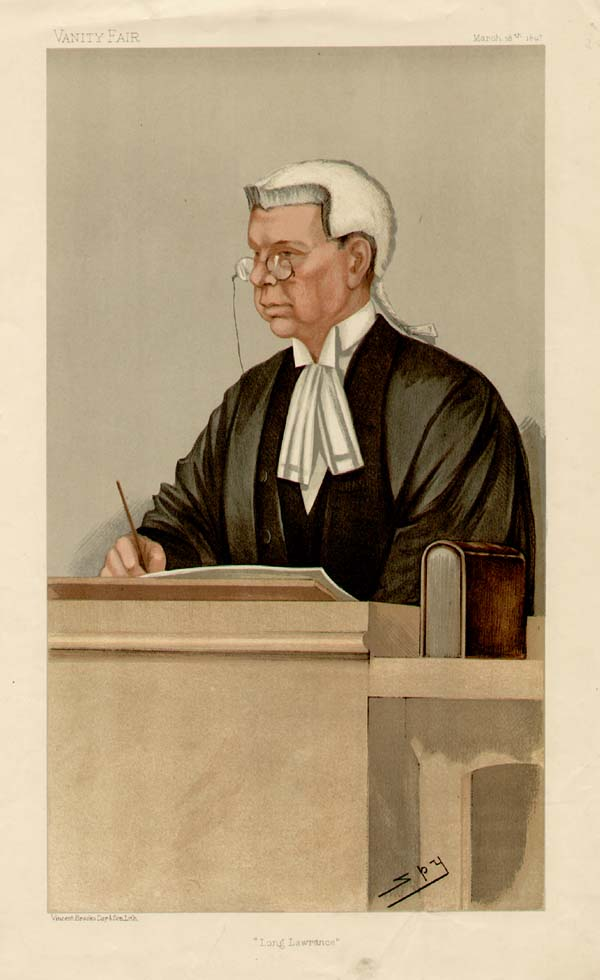
- "Long Lawrance", caricature in Vanity Fair, 1897.

Justice of the High Court
- In office 24 February 1890 – 15 April 1912
- Preceded by: Sir William Field

Member of Parliament for Stamford
- In office 1885–1890
- Preceded by: Marston Clarke Buszard
- Succeeded by: Henry Cust

Member of Parliament for South Lincolnshire
- In office 1880–1885 Serving with Sir William Welby-Gregory, Bt. (1880–1884); Hon. Murray Finch-Hatton (1884–1885)
- Preceded by: Edmund Turnor; Sir William Welby-Gregory, Bt.
- Succeeded by: Constituency abolished

Personal details
- Born: John Compton Lawrance; 30 May 1832
- Died: 5 December 1912 (aged 80)
- Party: Conservative
- Spouse: Charlotte Georgina Smart (m. 1861)
- Children: 1

Sir John Compton Lawrance, PC (30 May 1832 – 5 December 1912) was an English judge and Conservative Party politician. He was Conservative MP for South Lincolnshire from 1880 to 1885 and for Stamford from 1885 until 1890, when he was appointed to the High Court, where he served until 1912.

One of Lord Halsbury's political appointments to the bench as Lord Chancellor, Lawrance acquired a degree of notoriety for his incompetence as a judge, at least in commercial cases. His conduct of one commercial action was said to be so inept that it was credited with the creation of the Commercial Court, earning him the moniker "the Only Begetter of the Commercial Court". He was, however, said to be a good criminal judge and was personally well-liked.

== Background and political career ==
Lawrance was the only son of Thomas Munton Lawrance of Dunsby Hall, Lincolnshire and his wife Louisa, née Compton. He was called to the bar at Lincoln's Inn in 1859, became a Queen's Counsel in 1877, and a bencher of Lincoln's Inn in 1879. He was not well known in London and mainly practiced on the Midland Circuit; he also practiced as a revising barrister. He was appointed Recorder of Derby in 1879 and was a JP for Lincolnshire.

In 1878, Lawrance stood unsuccessfully for Parliament as a Conservative at a by-election in Peterborough, but at the 1880 general election he was elected as Member of Parliament (MP) for South Lincolnshire. That constituency was abolished by the Redistribution of Seats Act 1885, and at the 1885 general election Lawrance was elected MP for Stamford. He was appointed a Deputy Lieutenant of Lincolnshire in 1886.

== High Court judge ==
=== Appointment ===
Lawrance was appointed a Justice of the High Court in 1890, in succession to Mr Justice Field. He was assigned to the King's Bench Division, receiving the customary knighthood on 30 June 1890. Lawrance had been nominated by Lord Halsbury, who had a reputation for choosing judges on party political grounds, especially from the ranks of "unsuccessful Tory M.P.s with large majorities and no incomes".

The appointment was greeted with "hoots of derision". The Daily News said Lawrance was unfit for the lowest judicial appointment. The Law Times wrote that "This is a bad appointment, for although a popular man and a thorough English gentleman, Mr. Lawrance has no reputation as a lawyer, and has been rarely seen of recent years in the Royal Courts of Justice". The Law Journal, however, cautiously welcomed the appointment, noting his professional experience, knowledge of business, and high character, though it also commented that "probably Mr. Lawrance does affect to be a great lawyer". It also noted that his appointment, "on personal grounds... will be very acceptable to every member of the profession."

=== "The Only Begetter of the Commercial Court" ===
The case for which Lawrance achieved lasting notoriety was Rose v Bank of Australasia (1891), which involved a complex issue of general average contribution from cargo-owners. The case was tried without a jury by Lawrance J over 22 days in May 1891, who then reserved judgment. It was argued by some of the leading figures of the commercial bar: Arthur Cohen QC (with him Thomas Edward Scrutton) appeared for the plaintiffs; Gorell Barnes QC (with him J. A. Hamilton) appeared for the defendants.

Scrutton described Lawrance was "a very popular Judge—who had practised in a purely agricultural county, and whose elevation was not wholly unconnected with his devoted services to his party". Sir Frank MacKinnon, who was later Scrutton's pupil, reported that:

The judge knew as much about the principles of general average as a Hindoo about figure-skating. He listened with a semblance of interest to Cohen and Gorell Barnes, reserved judgment, and forgot all about the case. After a long delay he was somehow reminded that he ought to give judgment. This he did—in favour of the plaintiff. To his horror Gorell Barnes then rose and said he had failed to deal with a very important point. Not having the least idea what the point was, he pulled himself together and said: 'Oh, yes; I meant to say that having considered that I think the adjusters took the right view, and in that respect also I think the claim as made out by them ought to succeed'.

The defendants appealed to the Court of Appeal, which reversed Lawrance on questions of law and fact. On further appeal, the House of Lords (Lord Herschell LC, Lord Watson, and Lord Morris) restored the judgment for the plaintiffs, though they did not rely on his reasoning.

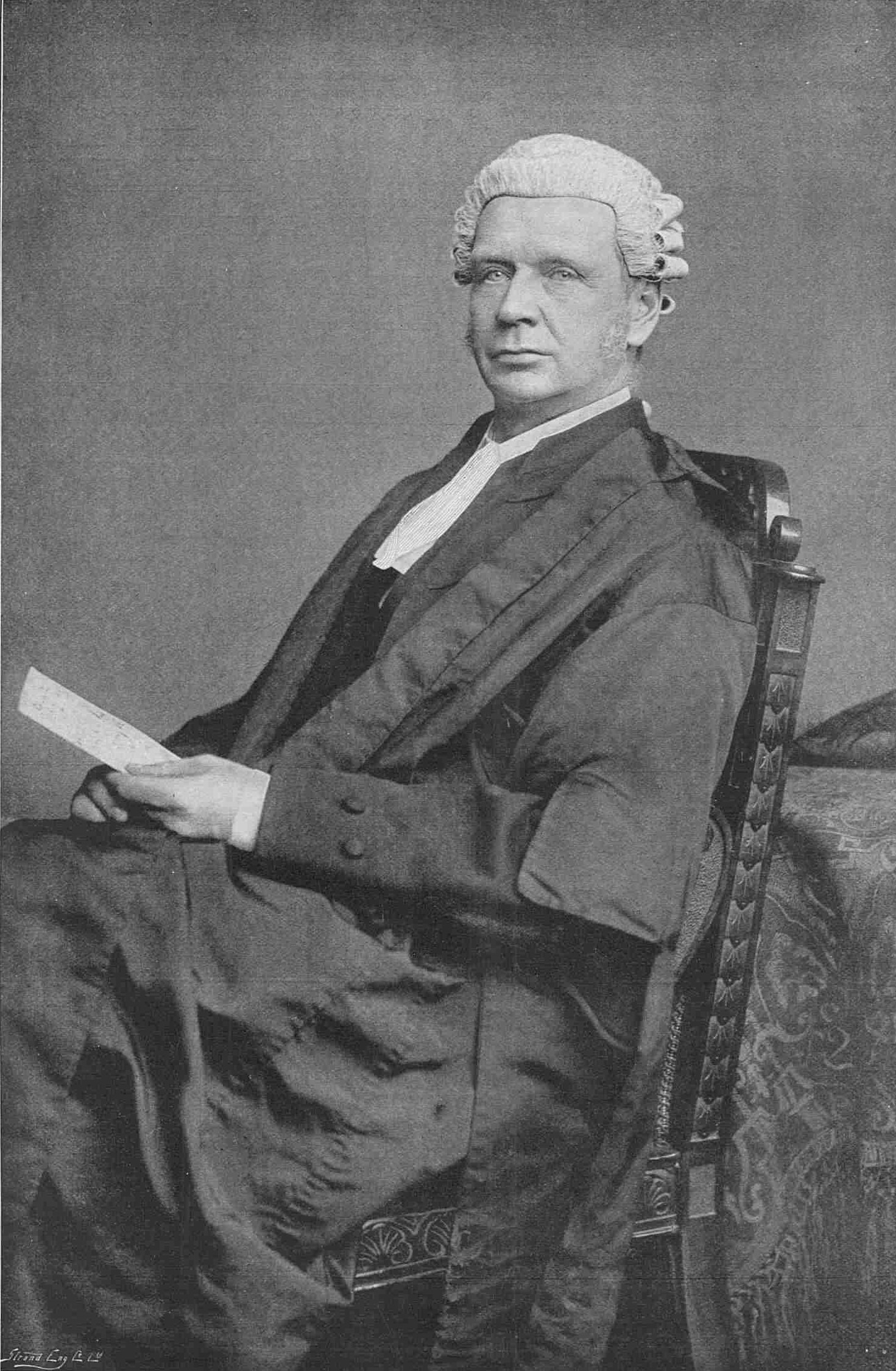
Sir John Lawrance in his gowns

According to Scrutton and MacKinnon, Lawrance's performance in this case incensed the mercantile community so much that it led to the creation of the Commercial Court in 1895, thus making him "the Only Begetter of the Commercial Court". This account has been largely accepted by modern commentators such as R. F. V. Heuston and Sir Roger Toulson, although some recent writers have argued that this was either something of an exaggeration or remains unproven.

=== Later years ===
Lawrance continued to sit in the King's Bench Division, eventually becoming the most senior judge in the King's Bench Division. In 1898, he tried the Russian revolutionary Vladimir Burtsev and the typesetter Klement Wierzbicki for publishing a pamphlet which called for the murder of Nicholas II. The same year, he was one of the judges called upon by the House of Lords to provide an advisory opinion in Allen v Flood. Lawrance was strongly criticised in Lord William Beauchamp Nevill's book, Penal Servitude (1903), Lawrance having sent Nevill down for fraud in 1898 with a strong reprimand and five years in Wormwood Scrubs and Parkhurst.

In 1906, he was one of the two judges appointed to hear election petitions arising from that year's general election. At the hearing of the Maidstone petition, he sat with Mr Justice Grantham, another former Conservative MP elevated by Halsbury, who was subsequently the subject of a motion of censure in the House of Commons for his perceived partiality toward the Conservative candidate, but Lawrance's conduct was not questioned. In 1903, he presided over the second trial of William Gardiner for the murder of Rose Harsent: as with the first trial, the jury was unable to come to a verdict, and the prosecution entered a nolle prosequi.

In November 1911, Lawrance fell ill, and resigned on 15 April 1912. He was sworn of the Privy Council on 19 July, and died on 5 December 1912, aged 80.

=== Family ===
In 1861, Lawrance married Charlotte Georgina Smart, daughter of Major Smart of Boston, Lincolnshire. They had one son, Thomas Dalton Lawrance (1865–1930), sometime Assistant Registrar of the Court of Criminal Appeal; he married in 1898 Millicent Emma Rachel Fane, daughter of W. D. Fane, of Fulbeck Hall.

== Assessments ==
Assessments of Lawrance as a judge tend to be negative. Lord Justice MacKinnon wrote that:

Mr. Justice J. C. Lawrance was a stupid man, a very ill-equipped lawyer, and a bad judge. He was not the worst judge I have appeared before: that distinction I would assign to Mr. Justice Ridley [another Conservative MP controversially elevated by Halsbury]. Ridley had much better brains than Lawrance, but he had a perverse instinct for unfairness that Lawrance could never approach. It is perhaps not without significance that Lawrance and Ridley both failed to get admission to the modern Valhalla, the Dictionary of National Biography."

However, Lawrance had his defenders, especially from the criminal bar. Frederic Holman and Sir Travers Humphreys both praised him for his common sense, while Ernest Bowen-Rowlands KC said that on circuit he was "a good judge and in crime one of the best judges I have practiced before". The Times commented that:

In the conduct of a trial with a jury he was usually patient and reasonable, and as a Criminal Judge he appears to have had no prepossession either towards undue severity or a flabby leniency. In this respect he was a satisfactory Judge, but he was hardly equal to a sustained course of reasoning or to the interpretation of intricate Acts of Parliament. In case involving these he was generally content simply to express his concurrence with a senior colleague, or in revenue cases to decide in favour of the Crown.

Lawrance was personally well-liked: he was said to possess "an unostentatious sense of humour and a commendable gift of reticence". Another otherwise critical account credited him with "prudence and self-restraint, and is irreproachable in word and act, and is, in fact, liked and admired for many qualities." On his retirement, The Law Journal commented that although this "has not seriously reduced the judicial store of erudition, it has deprived the King's Bench Division of one of its most attractive personalities." Lawrance was nicknamed "Long Lawrance", both in reference to his height (he was said to be the tallest judge on the bench) and to distinguish him from A. T. Lawrence.

Heuston wrote that Lawrance was "as undistinguished on the Bench as [he] had been at the Bar", but that although he was not a clever man, "before the Great War, the English did not always want clever men in public positions. They often preferred an honest gentleman."

Parliament of the United Kingdom
Preceded by Sir William Welby-Gregory; Edmund Turnor	Member of Parliament for South Lincolnshire; 1880–1885; With: Sir William Welby-Gregory 1880–1884; Murray Finch-Hatton	Constituency abolished
Preceded by Marston Clarke Buszard	Member of Parliament for Stamford; 1885–1890	Succeeded by Henry Cust
