= May 1866 North Devon by-election =

UK parliamentary by-election

The May 1866 North Devon by-election was held on 9 May 1866, when the incumbent Conservative MP Charles Trefusis became ineligible, having acceded to the title of Baron Clinton, upon the death of his father. The by-election was won by the Conservative Party candidate Stafford Northcote, erstwhile MP for Stamford, who stood unopposed.
