= Stamford (constituency) =

Former constituency in the county of Lincolnshire of the House of Commons

- Former borough constituency for the House of Commons

1295–1885
- Seats: one
- Created from: Lincolnshire
- Replaced by: Stamford
- Seats: two (until 1868), one (1868–1885)

Stamford (or South Kesteven) division of Lincolnshire
- Former county constituency for the House of Commons

1885–1918
- Seats: one
- Created from: Stamford
- Replaced by: Rutland and Stamford

Stamford was a constituency in the county of Lincolnshire of the House of Commons for the Parliament of England to 1706 then of the Parliament of Great Britain from 1707 to 1800 and of the Parliament of the United Kingdom from 1801 to 1918. It was represented by two Members of Parliament until 1868 when this was reduced to one.

== Boundaries ==
The parliamentary borough was based upon the town of Stamford in the Parts of Kesteven (a traditional sub-division of the county of Lincolnshire).

When the borough constituency was abolished in 1885, the Stamford (or South Kesteven) division of Lincolnshire was created. This included the town of Stamford and surrounding territory. The county division was a considerably larger constituency than the borough one had been.

From the 1885 general election until the dissolution before the 1918 election the constituency was surrounded by to the north Sleaford; to the east Spalding; to the south east Wisbech; to the south North Northamptonshire; to the south west Rutland; to the west Melton and to the north west Newark. The constituency of Grantham was an enclave wholly surrounded by Stamford.

== History ==
The Victoria County History of the County of Lincoln includes some information about the representation of Stamford in early times.

Stamford, on the other hand, which had sent Nicholas de Burton and Clement de Melton to the Parliament of 1295, only exercised what its burghers probably regarded as an onerous privilege once in the reign of Edward II when in 1322 it elected Eustace Malherbe and Hugh de Thurleby.

A further paragraph relates the position before and after the borough began to send representatives regularly in 1467.

Stamford for some 150 years after the reign of Edward II apparently forbore to exercise its onerous privilege of returning members. In the seventeenth century it was afflicted with the usual controversy prevalent in small communities as to where the right of election lay, and the Committee of Privileges reported in 1661 'That the right of election was in such freemen only as paid scot and lot'.

Sedgwick explained in The House of Commons 1715-1754 that before 1727 the Bertie and Cecil families each nominated one member. From 1727 the Cecil interest controlled both seats. An attempt was made by Savile Cust in 1734 to establish an electoral interest in the borough, but when this failed the Cecils were left with a secure pocket borough.

Namier and Brooke in The House of Commons 1754-1790 confirmed that before the Reform Act 1832 the right of election was in the inhabitants of the parliamentary borough paying scot and lot, a local tax. They estimated the number of voters at about 500 (unchanged from Sedgwick's estimate for the earlier part of the century). In 1754–1790, despite the comparatively large electorate, the constituency was under the control of the Earl of Exeter (the head of the senior branch of the House of Cecil) and elections were uncontested formalities.

The Reform Act replaced the scot and lot franchise with an occupation franchise, which slightly reduced the size of the electorate. This was because the value of the property occupation of which conferred a vote, was higher than that for houses upon which scot and lot became payable.

The area was strongly Tory or Conservative in politics. From 1801 until 1918 it only twice elected an MP from other parties (a Whig in 1831 and a Liberal in 1880). Elections before the 1874 United Kingdom general election were usually uncontested.

The borough had some distinguished representatives in the 19th century. It returned two of the three members of the triumvirate which attempted to lead the protectionist Tories in the House of Commons. The Marquess of Granby had little to commend himself as a political leader, apart from the social prestige of being the heir to the Duke of Rutland. He was briefly sole leader in 1848 before the triumvirate was created in the following year and continued until his resignation in 1851. John Charles Herries had at least held senior ministerial office. Both the Stamford MPs were easily eclipsed by the rising star of their colleague Benjamin Disraeli.

A more significant historical figure was Lord Robert Cecil (Viscount Cranborne 1865–1868) who represented the borough between 1853 and 1868. As the Marquess of Salisbury he was the leading figure in the Conservative Party from the death of Disraeli in 1881 until he retired as Prime Minister in 1902.

Another leading Conservative with connections to the borough was Sir Stafford Northcote, Bt the party leader in the House of Commons 1876-1885 (from 1881 at the same time as Salisbury was leader in the House of Lords). Northcote was a Stamford MP from 1858 to 1866.

Under the Reform Act 1867 the borough electorate was expanded, but it lost one seat in Parliament from the 1868 United Kingdom general election.

The Representation of the People Act 1884 further expanded the electorate. The Redistribution of Seats Act 1885 abolished the borough constituency but created an expanded county division of the same name. These changes took effect with the 1885 United Kingdom general election.

Under the Representation of the People Act 1918 the electorate was again expanded, but the Stamford area was combined with the county of Rutland in a new Rutland and Stamford constituency.

== Members of Parliament ==
=== MPs 1295–1322 ===
- 1295: Nicholas de Burton, Clement de Melton
- 1322: Eustace Malherbe, Hugh de Thurleby

After this date no members were returned for a considerable period.

=== MPs 1467–1640 ===
- 1543(?): William Cecil (Note: Cecil's diary records that he was elected an MP in 1543, but the parliamentary records are incomplete. Neale has suggested that he was probably elected for Stamford, which was certainly his constituency from 1547)

| Year | First member | Second member |
|---|---|---|
| 1485 | Christopher Browne | |
| 1489 | Christopher Browne | |
| 1495 | Christopher Browne | |
| 1510 | David Cecil | Francis Browne |
| 1512 | David Cecil | William Hussey |
| 1515 | David Cecil | George Kirkham |
| 1523 | David Cecil | Maurice Johnson |
| 1529 | John Hardgrave | Maurice Johnson |
| 1536 | Henry Lacy | Maurice Johnson |
| 1539 | Richard Cecil | Kenelm Digby |
| 1542 | Henry Lacy | John Allen |
| 1545 | Henry Lacy | Leonard Irby |
| 1547 | William Cecil | John Allen |
| 1553 (Mar) | Richard Cooke | Robert Lacy |
| 1553 (Oct) | Thomas Heneage | John Allen |
| 1554 (Apr) | John Allen | Roland Durrant |
| 1554 (Nov) | John Fenton | Henry Lee |
| 1555 | Francis Yaxley | Francis Thorneff |
| 1558 | Francis Thorneff | John Houghton |
| 1559 | William Cooke | John Houghton |
| 1562–1563 | Thomas Cecil | Francis Thorneff |
| 1571 | Thomas Cecil | Michael Lewis |
| 1572 | Thomas Cecil | Francis Harington |
| 1584 | Robert Wingfield | George Lynne |
| 1586 | William Cecil, Lord Burghley | Robert Wingfield |
| 1588–1589 | William Cecil, Lord Burghley | Robert Wingfield |
| 1593 | Robert Wingfield | Richard Shute |
| 1597 | Robert Wingfield | Thomas Balgaye |
| 1601 | Robert Wingfield | Edward Watson |
| 1604 | Sir Robert Wingfield | Henry Hall |
| 1614 | Richard Cecil | John Jay |
| 1621 | Sir Richard Cecil | John Wingfield |
| 1624 | Sir George Goring; Goring, sat for Lewes and replaced by Edward Ayscough | John St Amand |
| 1625 | Montagu Bertie | John St Amand |
| 1626 | Montagu Bertie | Brian Palmes |
| 1628–1629 | Thomas Hatton | Sir Edward Bashe |
| 1629–1640 | No Parliaments convened | |

=== MPs 1640–1868 ===
| Year | First member | First party | Second member | Second party |
|---|---|---|---|---|
| April 1640 | Thomas Hatton | | Thomas Hatcher | |
| November 1640 | Geoffrey Palmer | Royalist | Thomas Hatcher | Parliamentarian |
| September 1642 | Palmer disabled to sit - seat vacant | | Thomas Hatcher | Parliamentarian |
| 1645 | John Weaver | | Thomas Hatcher | Parliamentarian |
| December 1648 | John Weaver | | Hatcher excluded in Pride's Purge - seat vacant | |
| 1653 | Stamford was unrepresented in the Barebones Parliament | | | |
| 1654 | John Weaver | | Stamford had only one seat in the First and Second Parliaments of the Protectorate | |
| 1656 | John Weaver | | Stamford had only one seat in the First and Second Parliaments of the Protectorate | |
| January 1659 | John Weaver | | Christopher Clapham | |
| May 1659 | Not represented in the restored Rump | | | |
| April 1660 | John Hatcher | | Francis Wingfield | |
| 1661 | William Stafford | | William Montagu | |
| 1665 | Hon. Peregrine Bertie | Tory | William Montagu | |
| 1677 | Hon. Peregrine Bertie | Tory | Henry Noel | Tory |
| 1678 | Hon. Peregrine Bertie | Tory | Hon. Charles Bertie | Tory |
| 1679 | Sir Richard Cust, Bt. | Whig | William Hyde | |
| 1685 | Hon. Peregrine Bertie | Tory | Hon. Charles Bertie | |
| 1689 | William Hyde | | Hon. Charles Bertie | |
| 1694 | Hon. Philip Bertie | | Hon. Charles Bertie | |
| 1698 | Hon. William Cecil | | Hon. Charles Bertie | |
| 1705 | Charles Cecil | | Hon. Charles Bertie | |
| 1711 | Charles Cecil | | Charles Bertie | Tory |
| March 1722 | Hon. Brownlow Cecil | | Charles Bertie | Tory |
| October 1722 | William Noel | | Charles Bertie | Tory |
| 1727 | William Noel | | Robert Shirley | |
| 1734 | William Noel | | John Proby | |
| June 1747 | John Proby, junior (Note: Created The Lord Carysfort (in the Peerage of Ireland, January 1752) | | Lord Burghley (Note: Burghley was also elected for Rutland, which he chose to represent, and never sat for Stamford) | |
| December 1747 | John Proby, junior | | Robert Barbor | Non partisan |
| 1754 | John Harvey-Thursby | Non partisan | Robert Barbor | Non partisan |
| 1761 | John Chaplin | Non partisan | George Bridges Brudenell | Non partisan |
| 1765 by-election | George René Aufrère | Non partisan | George Bridges Brudenell | Non partisan |
| 1768 | George René Aufrère | Non partisan | Lieutenant-General (Sir) George Howard (Note: Knighted (KB), 1774; General from 1777, Field Marshal from 1793) | Non partisan |
| 1774 | Henry Cecil | Non partisan | Lieutenant-General (Sir) George Howard | Non partisan |
| 1790 | The Earl of Carysfort (Note: In the Peerage of Ireland) | Non partisan | Lieutenant-General (Sir) George Howard | Non partisan |
| 1796 by-election | The Earl of Carysfort | Non partisan | Lieutenant-General John Leland (Note: Later a General) | Tory |
| 1801 by-election | Lieutenant-General Albemarle Bertie | Tory | Lieutenant-General John Leland | Tory |
| 1808 by-election | Lieutenant-General Albemarle Bertie | Tory | Evan Foulkes | Tory |
| 1809 by-election | Charles Chaplin | Tory | Evan Foulkes | Tory |
| 1812 | The Lord Henniker | Tory | Evan Foulkes | Tory |
| 1818 | Lord Thomas Cecil | Tory | Captain the Hon. William Percy | Tory |
| 1826 | Lord Thomas Cecil | Tory | Thomas Chaplin | Tory |
| 1831 | Lord Thomas Cecil | Tory | Charles Tennyson | Whig |
| 1832 | Thomas Chaplin | Tory | George Finch | Tory |
| 1834 | Thomas Chaplin | Conservative | George Finch | Conservative |
| 1837 | Thomas Chaplin | Conservative | Marquess of Granby | Conservative |
| 1838 by-election | Sir George Clerk, Bt | Conservative | Marquess of Granby | Conservative |
| 1847 | Rt Hon. John Charles Herries | Conservative | Marquess of Granby | Conservative |
| 1852 | Rt Hon. John Charles Herries | Conservative | Sir Frederic Thesiger | Conservative |
| 1853 by-election | Lord Robert Cecil (Note: Styled Viscount Cranborne from 1865) | Conservative | Sir Frederic Thesiger | Conservative |
| March 1858 by-election | Lord Robert Cecil | Conservative | John Inglis | Conservative |
| July 1858 by-election | Lord Robert Cecil | Conservative | Sir Stafford Northcote, Bt | Conservative |
| 1866 by-election | Lord Robert Cecil | Conservative | Sir John Dalrymple-Hay, Bt | Conservative |
| May 1868 by-election | Viscount Ingestre | Conservative | Sir John Dalrymple-Hay, Bt | Conservative |
| June 1868 by-election | William Unwin Heygate | Conservative | Sir John Dalrymple-Hay, Bt | Conservative |
| 1868 | Reform Act 1867: Constituency reduced to one seat. | | | |

=== MPs 1868–1918 ===
| Election | Member | Party |
|---|---|---|
| 1868 | Sir John Dalrymple-Hay, Bt | Conservative |
| 1880 | Marston Clarke Buszard | Liberal |
1885: Borough constituency abolished. Name transferred to county division.
| 1885 | John Lawrance | Conservative |
| 1890 by-election | Henry Cust | Conservative |
| 1895 | William Younger | Conservative |
| 1906 | Lord John Joicey-Cecil | Conservative |
| 1910 | Claud Heathcote-Drummond-Willoughby | Conservative |
| 1918 | Constituency abolished | |

== Election notes ==
The bloc vote electoral system was used in two seat elections and first past the post for single member by-elections. Each voter had up to as many votes as there were seats to be filled. Votes had to be cast by a spoken declaration, in public, at the hustings (until the secret ballot was introduced in 1872).

Note on percentage change calculations: Where there was only one candidate of a party in successive elections, for the same number of seats, change is calculated on the party percentage vote. Where there was more than one candidate, in one or both successive elections for the same number of seats, then change is calculated on the individual percentage vote.

Note on sources: The information for the election results given below is taken from Namier and Brooke 1754–1790, Stooks Smith 1790-1832 and Craig from the 1832 United Kingdom general election. Where Stooks Smith gives additional information or differs from the other sources this is indicated in a note after the result.

== Elections before 1715 ==
Dates of parliaments 1660–1715

| Summoned | Elected | Opened | Dismissed |
|---|---|---|---|
| 16 March 1660 | 1660 | 25 April 1660 | 29 December 1660 |
| 18 February 1661 | 1661 | 8 May 1661 | 24 January 1679 |
| 25 January 1679 | 1679 | 6 March 1679 | 12 July 1679 |
| 24 July 1679 | 1679–1680 | 21 October 1680 | 18 January 1681 |
| 20 January 1681 | 1681 | 21 March 1681 | 28 March 1681 |
| 14 February 1685 | 1685 | 19 May 1685 | 2 July 1687 |
| 29 December 1688 | 1688–1689 | 22 January 1689 | 6 February 1690 |
| 6 February 1690 | 1690 | 20 March 1690 | 11 October 1695 |
| 12 October 1695 | 1695 | 22 November 1695 | 6 July 1698 |
| 13 July 1698 | 1698 | 24 August 1698 | 19 December 1700 |
| 26 December 1700 | 1700–1701 | 6 February 1701 | 11 November 1701 |
| 3 November 1701 | 1701 | 30 December 1701 | 2 July 1702 |
| 2 July 1702 | 1702 | 20 August 1702 | 5 April 1705 |
| 1705 | 7 May – 6 June 1705 | 14 June 1705 | see Note |
| 1707 | see Note | 23 October 1707 | 3 April 1708 |
| 1708 | 30 April – 7 July 1708 | 8 July 1708 | 21 September 1710 |
| 1710 | 2 October – 16 November 1710 | 25 November 1710 | 8 August 1713 |
| 1713 | 22 August – 12 November 1713 | 12 November 1713 | 15 January 1715 |

Note:-

- The MPs of the Parliament of England (elected 1705) and 45 members co-opted from the former Parliament of Scotland, became the House of Commons of the 1st Parliament of Great Britain in 1707.

== Election results 1715–1800 ==
1710s – 1720s – 1730s – 1740s – 1750s – 1760s – 1770s – 1780s – 1790s

=== Elections in the 1710s ===
General election 2 February 1715: Stamford (2 seats)
| Party | Candidate | Votes | % | ±% |
|---|---|---|---|---|
| Nonpartisan | Charles Cecil | Unopposed | N/A | N/A |
| Nonpartisan | Charles Bertie | Unopposed | N/A | N/A |

=== Elections in the 1720s ===
General election 24 March 1722: Stamford (2 seats)
| Party | Candidate | Votes | % | ±% |
|---|---|---|---|---|
| Nonpartisan | Brownlow Cecil | Unopposed | N/A | N/A |
| Nonpartisan | Charles Bertie | Unopposed | N/A | N/A |

- Succession of Cecil as 8th Earl of Exeter

By-election 24 October 1722: Stamford
| Party | Candidate | Votes | % | ±% |
|---|---|---|---|---|
| Nonpartisan | William Noel | Unopposed | N/A | N/A |
| Nonpartisan hold | | Swing | N/A | |

General election 19 August 1727: Stamford (2 seats)
| Party | Candidate | Votes | % | ±% |
|---|---|---|---|---|
| Nonpartisan | William Noel | Elected | N/A | N/A |
| Nonpartisan | Robert Shirley | Elected | N/A | N/A |
| Nonpartisan | Charles Bertie | Defeated | N/A | N/A |

=== Elections in the 1730s ===
General election 25 April 1734: Stamford (2 seats)
| Party | Candidate | Votes | % | ±% |
|---|---|---|---|---|
| Nonpartisan | William Noel | 339 | 32.60 | N/A |
| Nonpartisan | John Proby | 316 | 30.38 | N/A |
| Nonpartisan | Savile Cust | 205 | 19.71 | N/A |
| Nonpartisan | Thomas Fonnereau | 180 | 17.31 | N/A |
| Turnout | | 1,040 | N/A | N/A |

- Seat vacated when Noel was appointed to an office

By-election 13 February 1738: Stamford
| Party | Candidate | Votes | % | ±% |
|---|---|---|---|---|
| Nonpartisan | William Noel | Unopposed | N/A | N/A |
| Nonpartisan hold | | Swing | N/A | |

=== Elections in the 1740s ===
General election 6 May 1741: Stamford (2 seats)
| Party | Candidate | Votes | % | ±% |
|---|---|---|---|---|
| Nonpartisan | William Noel | Unopposed | N/A | N/A |
| Nonpartisan | John Proby | Unopposed | N/A | N/A |

General election 29 June 1747: Stamford (2 seats)
| Party | Candidate | Votes | % | ±% |
|---|---|---|---|---|
| Nonpartisan | Lord Burghley | Unopposed | N/A | N/A |
| Nonpartisan | John Proby | Unopposed | N/A | N/A |

- Seat vacated when Burghley chose to sit for Rutland

By-election 8 December 1747: Stamford
| Party | Candidate | Votes | % | ±% |
|---|---|---|---|---|
| Nonpartisan | Robert Barbor | Unopposed | N/A | N/A |
| Nonpartisan hold | | Swing | N/A | |

=== Elections in the 1750s ===
General election 16 April 1754: Stamford (2 seats)
| Party | Candidate | Votes | % | ±% |
|---|---|---|---|---|
| Nonpartisan | John Harvey-Thursby | Unopposed | N/A | N/A |
| Nonpartisan | Robert Barbor | Unopposed | N/A | N/A |

=== Elections in the 1760s ===
General election 30 March 1761: Stamford (2 seats)
| Party | Candidate | Votes | % | ±% |
|---|---|---|---|---|
| Nonpartisan | John Chaplin | Unopposed | N/A | N/A |
| Nonpartisan | George Bridges Brudenell | Unopposed | N/A | N/A |

- Death of Chaplin

By-election 21 January 1765: Stamford
| Party | Candidate | Votes | % | ±% |
|---|---|---|---|---|
| Nonpartisan | George René Aufrère | Unopposed | N/A | N/A |
| Nonpartisan hold | | Swing | N/A | |

- Seat vacated on the appointment of Brudenell to an office

By-election 26 December 1765: Stamford
| Party | Candidate | Votes | % | ±% |
|---|---|---|---|---|
| Nonpartisan | George Bridges Brudenell | Unopposed | N/A | N/A |
| Nonpartisan hold | | Swing | N/A | |

General election 19 March 1768: Stamford (2 seats)
| Party | Candidate | Votes | % | ±% |
|---|---|---|---|---|
| Nonpartisan | Sir George Howard | Unopposed | N/A | N/A |
| Nonpartisan | George René Aufrère | Unopposed | N/A | N/A |

=== Elections in the 1770s ===
General election 11 October 1774: Stamford (2 seats)
| Party | Candidate | Votes | % | ±% |
|---|---|---|---|---|
| Nonpartisan | Sir George Howard | Unopposed | N/A | N/A |
| Nonpartisan | Henry Cecil | Unopposed | N/A | N/A |

=== Elections in the 1780s ===
General election 13 September 1780: Stamford (2 seats)
| Party | Candidate | Votes | % | ±% |
|---|---|---|---|---|
| Nonpartisan | Sir George Howard | Unopposed | N/A | N/A |
| Nonpartisan | Henry Cecil | Unopposed | N/A | N/A |

General election 1 April 1784: Stamford (2 seats)
| Party | Candidate | Votes | % | ±% |
|---|---|---|---|---|
| Nonpartisan | Sir George Howard | Unopposed | N/A | N/A |
| Nonpartisan | Henry Cecil | Unopposed | N/A | N/A |

=== Elections in the 1790s ===
General election 1790: Stamford (2 seats)
| Party | Candidate | Votes | % | ±% |
|---|---|---|---|---|
| Nonpartisan | Sir George Howard | Unopposed | N/A | N/A |
| Whig | John Proby | Unopposed | N/A | N/A |

General election 1796: Stamford (2 seats)
| Party | Candidate | Votes | % | ±% |
|---|---|---|---|---|
| Nonpartisan | Sir George Howard | Unopposed | N/A | N/A |
| Whig | John Proby | Unopposed | N/A | N/A |

- Death of Howard

By-election October 1796: Stamford
| Party | Candidate | Votes | % | ±% |
|---|---|---|---|---|
| Tory | John Leland | Unopposed | N/A | N/A |
| Tory hold | | Swing | N/A | |

== Election results 1801–1918 ==
1800s – 1810s – 1820s – 1830s – 1840s – 1850s – 1860s – 1870s – 1880s – 1890s – 1900s – 1910s

=== Elections in the 1800s ===
- Proby was raised to the peerage as Earl of Carysfort

By-Election 16 February 1801: Stamford
| Party | Candidate | Votes | % | ±% |
|---|---|---|---|---|
| Tory | Albemarle Bertie | Unopposed | N/A | N/A |
| Tory gain from Whig | | | | |

General election 1802: Stamford (2 seats)
| Party | Candidate | Votes | % | ±% |
|---|---|---|---|---|
| Tory | John Leland | Unopposed | N/A | N/A |
| Tory | Albemarle Bertie | Unopposed | N/A | N/A |

General election 1806: Stamford (2 seats)
| Party | Candidate | Votes | % | ±% |
|---|---|---|---|---|
| Tory | John Leland | Unopposed | N/A | N/A |
| Tory | Albemarle Bertie | Unopposed | N/A | N/A |

General election 1807: Stamford (2 seats)
| Party | Candidate | Votes | % | ±% |
|---|---|---|---|---|
| Tory | John Leland | Unopposed | N/A | N/A |
| Tory | Albemarle Bertie | Unopposed | N/A | N/A |

- Death of Leland

By-election 30 January 1808: Stamford
| Party | Candidate | Votes | % | ±% |
|---|---|---|---|---|
| Tory | Evan Foulkes | Unopposed | N/A | N/A |
| Tory hold | | | | |

- Succession of Bertie as the 9th Earl of Lindsey

By-election 27 February 1809: Stamford
| Party | Candidate | Votes | % | ±% |
|---|---|---|---|---|
| Tory | Charles Chaplin | 306 | 68.3 | N/A |
| Whig | Jephson Oddy | 142 | 31.7 | New |
| Majority | | 154 | 36.6 | N/A |
| Turnout | | 448 | | N/A |
| Tory hold | | | | |

- Note (1809): Stooks Smith records that the polls were open for two days

=== Elections in the 1810s ===
General election 1812: Stamford (2 seats)
| Party | Candidate | Votes | % | ±% |
|---|---|---|---|---|
| Tory | Evan Foulkes | 360 | 36.5 | N/A |
| Tory | John Henniker-Major | 354 | 35.9 | N/A |
| Whig | Gerard Noel | 272 | 27.6 | N/A |
| Majority | | 82 | 8.3 | N/A |
| Turnout | | 986 (626 voted) | | N/A |
| Tory hold | | | | |
| Tory hold | | | | |

Note (1812): Stooks Smith records that the polls were open for two days

General election 1818: Stamford (2 seats)
| Party | Candidate | Votes | % | ±% |
|---|---|---|---|---|
| Tory | Lord Thomas Cecil | 328 | 49.1 | |
| Tory | William Henry Percy | 324 | 48.5 | |
| Whig | Joseph Clayton Jennyns | 12 | 1.8 | |
| Whig | Thomas Best | 4 | 0.6 | |
| Majority | | 312 | 46.7 | |
| Turnout | | 668 (336 voted) | | |
| Tory hold | | Swing | | |
| Tory hold | | Swing | | |

Note (1818): Stooks Smith records that the polls were open for one day

=== Elections in the 1820s ===
General election 1820: Stamford (2 seats)
| Party | Candidate | Votes | % | ±% |
|---|---|---|---|---|
| Tory | Lord Thomas Cecil | Unopposed | N/A | N/A |
| Tory | William Henry Percy | Unopposed | N/A | N/A |

General election 1826: Stamford (2 seats)
| Party | Candidate | Votes | % | ±% |
|---|---|---|---|---|
| Tory | Lord Thomas Cecil | Unopposed | N/A | N/A |
| Tory | Thomas Chaplin | Unopposed | N/A | N/A |

=== Elections in the 1830s ===
General election 1830: Stamford (2 seats)
| Party | Candidate | Votes | % |
|---|---|---|---|
| Tory | Lord Thomas Cecil | 467 | 41.8 |
| Tory | Thomas Chaplin | 335 | 30.0 |
| Whig | Charles Tennyson | 314 | 28.1 |
| Majority | | 21 | 1.9 |
| Turnout | | 667 | c. 86.6 |
| Registered electors | | c. 770 | |
| Tory hold | | | |
| Tory hold | | | |

Note (1830): Stooks Smith records that the polls were open for four days

General election 1831: Stamford (2 seats)
| Party | Candidate | Votes | % | ±% |
|---|---|---|---|---|
| Tory | Lord Thomas Cecil | 390 | 37.2 | −4.6 |
| Whig | Charles Tennyson | 356 | 34.0 | +5.9 |
| Tory | Thomas Chaplin | 302 | 28.8 | −1.2 |
| Turnout | | 666 | c. 86.5 | c. −0.1 |
| Registered electors | | c. 770 | | |
| Majority | | 34 | 3.2 | +1.3 |
| Tory hold | | Swing | −3.8 | |
| Majority | | 54 | 5.2 | N/A |
| Whig gain from Tory | | | | |

Note (1831): Stooks Smith records that the polls were open for three days

General election 1832: Stamford (2 seats)
| Party | Candidate | Votes | % | ±% |
|---|---|---|---|---|
| Tory | Thomas Chaplin | 526 | 40.9 | +12.1 |
| Tory | George Finch | 463 | 36.0 | −1.2 |
| Whig | Arthur Francis Gregory | 296 | 23.0 | −11.0 |
| Majority | | 167 | 13.0 | +9.8 |
| Turnout | | 766 | 90.0 | c. +3.5 |
| Registered electors | | 851 | | |
| Tory hold | | Swing | +7.5 | |
| Tory gain from Whig | | | | |

General election 1835: Stamford (2 seats)
| Party | Candidate | Votes | % | ±% |
|---|---|---|---|---|
| Conservative | Thomas Chaplin | Unopposed | | |
| Conservative | George Finch | Unopposed | | |
| Registered electors | | 755 | | |
| Conservative hold | | | | |
| Conservative hold | | | | |

General election 1837: Stamford (2 seats)
| Party | Candidate | Votes | % |
|---|---|---|---|
| Conservative | Thomas Chaplin | 201 | 50.0 |
| Conservative | Marquess of Granby | 200 | 49.8 |
| Whig | Hercules Langford Rowley | 1 | 0.2 |
| Majority | | 200 | 49.6 |
| Turnout | | 201 | 29.4 |
| Registered electors | | 684 | |
| Conservative hold | | | |
| Conservative hold | | | |

Note (1837): Rowley retired before the poll.

- Resignation of Chaplin

By-election, 1 May 1838: Stamford
| Party | Candidate | Votes | % |
|---|---|---|---|
| Conservative | Sir George Clerk | Unopposed | |
| Conservative hold | | | |

=== Elections in the 1840s ===
General election 1841: Stamford (2 seats)
| Party | Candidate | Votes | % | ±% |
|---|---|---|---|---|
| Conservative | Sir George Clerk | Unopposed | | |
| Conservative | Charles Manners | Unopposed | | |
| Registered electors | | 661 | | |
| Conservative hold | | | | |
| Conservative hold | | | | |

- Seat vacated on the appointment of Clerk as Master of the Mint

By-election, 10 February 1845: Stamford
| Party | Candidate | Votes | % | ±% |
|---|---|---|---|---|
| Conservative | Sir George Clerk | Unopposed | | |
| Conservative hold | | | | |

General election 1847: Stamford (2 seats)
| Party | Candidate | Votes | % | ±% |
|---|---|---|---|---|
| Conservative | Marquess of Granby | 349 | 40.0 | N/A |
| Conservative | John Charles Herries | 288 | 33.0 | N/A |
| Conservative | John Rolt | 236 | 27.0 | N/A |
| Majority | | 52 | 6.0 | N/A |
| Turnout | | 524 | 85.1 | N/A |
| Registered electors | | 616 | | |
| Conservative hold | | | | |
| Conservative hold | | | | |

Note (1847): Stooks Smith has a registered electorate figure of 613, but Craig's figure of 616 is used to calculate turnout.

=== Elections in the 1850s ===
- Seat vacated on the appointment of Herries as President of the Board of Control for India

By-election, 6 March 1852: Stamford
| Party | Candidate | Votes | % | ±% |
|---|---|---|---|---|
| Conservative | John Charles Herries | Unopposed | | |
| Conservative hold | | | | |

General election 1852: Stamford (2 seats)
| Party | Candidate | Votes | % | ±% |
|---|---|---|---|---|
| Conservative | John Charles Herries | Unopposed | | |
| Conservative | Sir Frederic Thesiger | Unopposed | | |
| Registered electors | | 566 | | |
| Conservative hold | | | | |
| Conservative hold | | | | |

- Resignation of Herries due to ill health

By-election, 22 August 1853: Stamford
| Party | Candidate | Votes | % | ±% |
|---|---|---|---|---|
| Conservative | Lord Robert Cecil | Unopposed | | |
| Conservative hold | | | | |

General election 1857: Stamford (2 seats)
| Party | Candidate | Votes | % | ±% |
|---|---|---|---|---|
| Conservative | Lord Robert Cecil | Unopposed | | |
| Conservative | Frederic Thesiger | Unopposed | | |
| Registered electors | | 529 | | |
| Conservative hold | | | | |
| Conservative hold | | | | |

- Seat vacated on the appointment of Thesiger as Lord Chancellor and his elevation to the peerage as the 1st Baron Chelmsford

By-election, 3 March 1858: Stamford
| Party | Candidate | Votes | % | ±% |
|---|---|---|---|---|
| Conservative | John Inglis | Unopposed | | |
| Conservative hold | | | | |

- Seat vacated on the appointment of Inglis as Lord Justice Clerk with the Scottish judicial title of Lord Glencorse

By-election, 17 July 1858: Stamford
| Party | Candidate | Votes | % | ±% |
|---|---|---|---|---|
| Conservative | Sir Stafford Northcote | Unopposed | | |
| Conservative hold | | | | |

General election 1859: Stamford (2 seats)
| Party | Candidate | Votes | % | ±% |
|---|---|---|---|---|
| Conservative | Lord Robert Cecil | Unopposed | | |
| Conservative | Sir Stafford Northcote | Unopposed | | |
| Registered electors | | 539 | | |
| Conservative hold | | | | |
| Conservative hold | | | | |

=== Elections in the 1860s ===
- Lord Robert Cecil became known by the courtesy title of Viscount Cranborne, following the death of his brother in 1865.

General election 1865: Stamford (2 seats)
| Party | Candidate | Votes | % | ±% |
|---|---|---|---|---|
| Conservative | Viscount Cranborne | Unopposed | | |
| Conservative | Sir Stafford Northcote | Unopposed | | |
| Registered electors | | 512 | | |
| Conservative hold | | | | |
| Conservative hold | | | | |

- Resignation of Northcote to contest by-election in North Devon

By-election, 8 May 1866: Stamford
| Party | Candidate | Votes | % | ±% |
|---|---|---|---|---|
| Conservative | Sir John Dalrymple-Hay | Unopposed | | |
| Conservative hold | | | | |

- Seats vacated on the appointment of Cranborne as Secretary of State for India and Hay as a Lord Commissioner of the Admiralty.

By-election, 12 July 1866: Stamford (2 seats)
| Party | Candidate | Votes | % | ±% |
|---|---|---|---|---|
| Conservative | Viscount Cranborne | Unopposed | | |
| Conservative | Sir John Dalrymple-Hay | Unopposed | | |
| Conservative hold | | | | |
| Conservative hold | | | | |

- Succession of Cranborne as the 3rd Marquess of Salisbury

By-election, 4 May 1868: Stamford
| Party | Candidate | Votes | % | ±% |
|---|---|---|---|---|
| Conservative | Viscount Ingestre | Unopposed | | |
| Conservative hold | | | | |

- Succession of Ingestre as the 19th Earl of Shrewsbury

By-election, 24 June 1868: Stamford
| Party | Candidate | Votes | % | ±% |
|---|---|---|---|---|
| Conservative | William Unwin Heygate | Unopposed | | |
| Conservative hold | | | | |

- Constituency electorate expanded and representation reduced to one seat, by the Reform Act 1867 with effect from the 1868 United Kingdom general election.

General election 1868: Stamford
| Party | Candidate | Votes | % | ±% |
|---|---|---|---|---|
| Conservative | Sir John Dalrymple-Hay | Unopposed | | |
| Registered electors | | 1,094 | | |
| Conservative hold | | | | |

=== Elections in the 1870s ===
General election 1874: Stamford
| Party | Candidate | Votes | % | ±% |
|---|---|---|---|---|
| Conservative | Sir John Dalrymple-Hay | 557 | 57.7 | N/A |
| Liberal | Marston Clarke Buszard | 411 | 42.3 | New |
| Majority | | 146 | 15.4 | N/A |
| Turnout | | 968 | 81.8 | N/A |
| Registered electors | | 1,183 | | |
| Conservative hold | | Swing | N/A | |

=== Elections in the 1880s ===
Buszard

General election 1880: Stamford
| Party | Candidate | Votes | % | ±% |
|---|---|---|---|---|
| Liberal | Marston Clarke Buszard | 601 | 52.2 | +9.9 |
| Conservative | Sir John Dalrymple-Hay | 551 | 47.8 | −9.9 |
| Majority | | 50 | 4.4 | N/A |
| Turnout | | 1,152 | 91.8 | +10.0 |
| Registered electors | | 1,255 | | |
| Liberal gain from Conservative | | Swing | +9.7 | |

- Electorate expanded by the Representation of the People Act 1884 and parliamentary borough abolished and replaced by a county division (under the Redistribution of Seats Act 1885) with substantial boundary changes; with effect from the 1885 United Kingdom general election.

General election 1885: Stamford
| Party | Candidate | Votes | % | ±% |
|---|---|---|---|---|
| Conservative | John Lawrance | 4,647 | 56.9 | +9.1 |
| Liberal | Joseph Stevens Cudlip | 3,514 | 43.1 | −9.1 |
| Majority | | 1,133 | 13.8 | N/A |
| Turnout | | 8,161 | 83.8 | −8.0 |
| Registered electors | | 9,741 | | |
| Conservative gain from Liberal | | Swing | +9.1 | |

General election 1886: Stamford
| Party | Candidate | Votes | % | ±% |
|---|---|---|---|---|
| Conservative | John Lawrance | Unopposed | | |
| Conservative hold | | | | |

=== Elections in the 1890s ===
Lawrance resigned after being appointed a Judge of the Queen's Bench division of the High Court of Justice, causing a by-election.

By-election, 7 March 1890: Stamford
| Party | Candidate | Votes | % | ±% |
|---|---|---|---|---|
| Conservative | Henry Cust | 4,236 | 51.7 | N/A |
| Liberal | Arthur Priestley | 3,954 | 48.3 | New |
| Majority | | 282 | 3.4 | N/A |
| Turnout | | 8,190 | 77.8 | N/A |
| Registered electors | | 10,526 | | |
| Conservative hold | | Swing | N/A | |

General election 1892: Stamford
| Party | Candidate | Votes | % | ±% |
|---|---|---|---|---|
| Conservative | Henry Cust | 4,150 | 50.8 | N/A |
| Liberal | Arthur Priestley | 4,026 | 49.2 | N/A |
| Majority | | 124 | 1.6 | N/A |
| Turnout | | 8,176 | 84.0 | N/A |
| Registered electors | | 9,733 | | |
| Conservative hold | | Swing | N/A | |

General election 1895: Stamford
| Party | Candidate | Votes | % | ±% |
|---|---|---|---|---|
| Conservative | William Younger | 4,203 | 52.4 | +1.6 |
| Liberal | Arthur Priestley | 3,814 | 47.6 | −1.6 |
| Majority | | 389 | 4.8 | +3.2 |
| Turnout | | 8,017 | 83.0 | −1.0 |
| Registered electors | | 9,657 | | |
| Conservative hold | | Swing | +1.7 | |

=== Elections in the 1900s ===
William Younger

General election 1900: Stamford
| Party | Candidate | Votes | % | ±% |
|---|---|---|---|---|
| Conservative | William Younger | 4,292 | 55.8 | +3.4 |
| Liberal | Lewis Haslam | 3,395 | 44.2 | −3.4 |
| Majority | | 897 | 11.6 | +6.8 |
| Turnout | | 7,687 | 80.6 | −1.4 |
| Registered electors | | 9,534 | | |
| Conservative hold | | Swing | +3.4 | |

General election 1906: Stamford
| Party | Candidate | Votes | % | ±% |
|---|---|---|---|---|
| Conservative | John Joicey-Cecil | 4,559 | 53.2 | −2.6 |
| Liberal | F. Percy Rawson | 4,018 | 46.9 | +2.7 |
| Majority | | 541 | 6.3 | −5.3 |
| Turnout | | 8,577 | 87.7 | +7.1 |
| Registered electors | | 9,782 | | |
| Conservative hold | | Swing | −2.7 | |

=== Elections in the 1910s ===
General election January 1910: Stamford
| Party | Candidate | Votes | % | ±% |
|---|---|---|---|---|
| Conservative | Claud Heathcote-Drummond-Willoughby | 4,666 | 52.0 | −1.2 |
| Liberal | George Henry Parkin | 4,310 | 48.0 | +1.1 |
| Majority | | 356 | 4.0 | −2.3 |
| Turnout | | 8,976 | 89.3 | +1.6 |
| Conservative hold | | Swing | −1.2 | |

General election December 1910: Stamford
| Party | Candidate | Votes | % | ±% |
|---|---|---|---|---|
| Conservative | Claud Heathcote-Drummond-Willoughby | 4,545 | 51.9 | −0.1 |
| Liberal | George Henry Parkin | 4,206 | 48.1 | +0.1 |
| Majority | | 339 | 3.8 | −0.2 |
| Turnout | | 8,751 | 87.0 | −2.3 |
| Conservative hold | | Swing | −0.1 | |

General election 1914–15:

Another general election was required to take place before the end of 1915. The political parties had been making preparations for an election to take place and by July 1914, the following candidates had been selected:

- Unionist: Claud Heathcote-Drummond-Willoughby
- Liberal: Frank Raffety

== Sources ==
- Boundaries of Parliamentary Constituencies 1885-1972, compiled and edited by F. W. S. Craig (Parliamentary Reference Publications 1972)
- British Parliamentary Election Results 1832-1885, compiled and edited by F. W. S. Craig (Macmillan Press 1977)
- British Parliamentary Election Results 1885-1918, compiled and edited by F. W. S. Craig (Macmillan Press 1974)
- The House of Commons 1715-1754, by Romney Sedgwick (HMSO 1970)
- The House of Commons 1754-1790, by Sir Lewis Namier and John Brooke (HMSO 1964)
- The Parliaments of England by Henry Stooks Smith (1st edition published in three volumes 1844–50), second edition edited (in one volume) by F. W. S. Craig (Political Reference Publications 1973)) out of copyright
- Leigh Rayment's Historical List of MPs – Constituencies beginning with "S" (part 4)
- The Victoria County History of the County of Lincoln: Volume 2, edited by William Page (first published in 1906; reprinted 1988 by Dawsons for the University of London Institute of Historical Research) out of copyright
- Who's Who of British Members of Parliament: Volume I 1832-1885, edited by M. Stenton (The Harvester Press 1976)
- Who's Who of British Members of Parliament, Volume II 1886-1918, edited by M. Stenton and S. Lees (Harvester Press 1978)
- Who's Who of British Members of Parliament, Volume III 1919-1945, edited by M. Stenton and S. Lees (Harvester Press 1979)
- Robert Beatson, A Chronological Register of Both Houses of Parliament (London: Longman, Hurst, Res & Orme, 1807)
- D. Brunton & D. H. Pennington, Members of the Long Parliament (London: George Allen & Unwin, 1954)
- Cobbett's Parliamentary history of England, from the Norman Conquest in 1066 to the year 1803 (London: Thomas Hansard, 1808)
- J. E. Neale, The Elizabethan House of Commons (London: Jonathan Cape, 1949)
