= William Field, 1st Baron Field =

English judge (1813–1907)

The Right Honourable The Lord Field PC
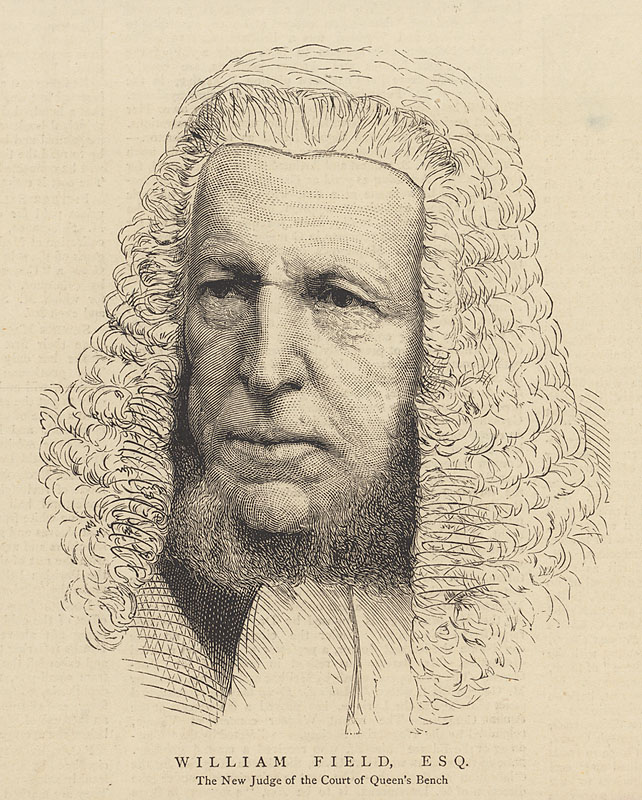

Justice of the High Court
- In office 1 November 1875 – 1890

Justice of the Queen's Bench
- In office 6 February 1875 – 1875

Personal details
- Born: William Ventris Field; 21 August 1813
- Died: 23 January 1907 (aged 93) Bognor, West Sussex

William Ventris Field, 1st Baron Field, PC (21 August 1813 – 23 January 1907), was an English judge.

== Background and education ==
Field was the fourth son of Thomas Flint Field, of Fielden, Bedfordshire. He was educated at King's School, Bruton, Somerset.

== Legal and judicial career ==
Field entered the legal profession as a solicitor. In 1843, however, he ceased to practise as such, and entered at the Inner Temple, being called to the Bar in 1850, after having practised for some time as a special pleader. He joined the Western circuit but soon exchanged it for the Midland. He obtained a large business as a junior, and became a Queen's Counsel and bencher of his inn in 1864.

As a QC he had an extensive common law practice and had for some time been the leader of the Midland circuit, when in February 1875, on the retirement of Mr. Justice Keating, he was raised to the bench as a justice of the queen's bench. Field was considered an excellent puisne judge of the type that attracts public attention. He was a lawyer who had knowledge of commercial while also being fair.

When the rules of the Supreme Court 1883 came into force in the autumn of that year, Field was so well recognized authority upon all questions of practice that the Lord Chancellor Lord Selborne selected him to sit continuously at Judge's Chambers in order that a consistent practise under the new rules might as far as possible be established. This he did for nearly a year, and his name will always, to a large extent, be associated with the settling of the details of the new procedure, which finally did away with the former elaborate system of special pleading.

In 1890, he retired from the bench and was raised to the peerage as Baron Field, of Bakeham in the County of Surrey, on 10 April 1890. He had been sworn of the Privy Council earlier the same year. In the House of Lords he at first took part, not infrequently, in the hearing of appeals, and notably delivered a carefully reasoned judgment in the case of the Bank of England v. Vagliano Brothers (5 March 1891), in which, with Lord Bramwell, he differed from the majority of his brother peers. Before long, however, deafness and advancing years rendered his attendances less frequent.

== Personal life ==
Lord Field died at Bognor on 23 January 1907, aged 95. As he left no issue his peerage became extinct.

== Notes ==
Peerage of the United Kingdom
New creation	Baron Field; 1890–1907	Extinct
