= Lord Thomas Cecil =

British politician (1797–1873)

Lord Thomas Cecil (1797–1873) was a British peer and member of Parliament for Stamford from 1818 to 1832.

Cecil was the youngest of the three sons of Henry Cecil, 1st Marquess of Exeter, by his second wife Sarah. He was educated at Eton and St John's College, Cambridge, graduating in 1815.

He married, on 8 August 1838, Lady Sophia Lennox, daughter of Charles Lennox, 4th Duke of Richmond, but they had no children. He died on 29 November 1873.
