= List of United Kingdom by-elections (1847–1857) =

This is a list of parliamentary by-elections in the United Kingdom held between 1847 and 1857, with the names of the previous incumbent and the victor in the by-election and their respective parties. Where seats changed political party at the election, the result is highlighted: light blue for a Conservative gain, orange for a Whig (including their Peelite allies) gain, green for Irish Repeal gain and grey for any other gain.

== Resignations ==
See Resignation from the British House of Commons for more details.

Where the cause of by-election is given as "resignation" or "seeks re-election", this indicates that the incumbent was appointed on his own request to an "office of profit under the Crown", either the Steward of the Chiltern Hundreds, the Steward of the Manor of Northstead or the Steward of the Manor of Hempholme. These appointments are made as a constitutional device for leaving the House of Commons, whose Members are not permitted to resign.

== By-elections ==
=== 16th Parliament (1852–1857) ===
By-election	Date	Former incumbent	Party	Winner	Party	Cause
County Tipperary	16 March 1857	James Sadleir	Independent Irish	Daniel O'Donoghue	Independent Irish	Expulsion (Absconded to avoid charges for fraud)
County Londonderry	9 March 1857	Thomas Bateson	Conservative	James Johnston Clark	Conservative	Resignation
East Sussex	7 March 1857	Charles Frewen	Conservative	Viscount Pevensey	Conservative	Resignation (intended to contest North Leicestershire)
Glasgow	6 March 1857	John MacGregor	Whig	Walter Buchanan	Whig	Resignation
North Leicestershire	2 March 1857 (Note: An uncontested by-election.)	Marquess of Granby	Conservative	Lord John Manners	Conservative	Succession to a peerage
Colchester	24 February 1857	Lord John Manners	Conservative	John Gurdon Rebow	Whig	Resignation in order to contest North Leicestershire
County Limerick	17 February 1857	William Monsell	Whig	William Monsell	Whig	President of the Board of Health (Note: Seat vacated on appointment to the office noted.)
Clonmel	17 February 1857	John O'Connell	Whig	John Bagwell	Whig	Resignation (Clerk of the Crown and Hanaper in Ireland)
West Kent	16 February 1857	Sir Edmund Filmer	Conservative	Charles Wykeham Martin	Whig	Death
Hereford	14 February 1857	Sir Robert Price	Whig	George Clive	Whig	Resignation
Bandon	14 February 1857	Viscount Bernard	Conservative	William Smyth Bernard	Conservative	Succession to an Irish peerage
Dumfriesshire	12 February 1857	Viscount Drumlanrig	Conservative	John Hope-Johnstone	Conservative	Succession to a Scottish peerage
Downpatrick	12 February 1857	Charles Hardinge	Conservative	Richard Ker	Conservative	Succession to a peerage
Buteshire	12 February 1857	James Stuart-Wortley	Peelite	James Stuart-Wortley	Peelite	Solicitor General for England and Wales
Southampton	11 February 1857	Alexander Cockburn	Whig	Thomas Matthias Weguelin	Whig	Resignation (Chief Justice of the Common Pleas)
Newport (I.O.W.)	11 February 1857	William Biggs	Whig	Robert Kennard	Conservative	Resignation
Kingston upon Hull	11 February 1857	William Henry Watson	Whig	James Clay	Whig	Resignation (Baron of the Court of Exchequer)
Hertford	9 February 1857	William Cowper	Whig	William Cowper	Whig	Vice-President of the Committee of the Council on Education
Greenwich	9 February 1857	Peter Rolt	Conservative	William Codrington	Whig	Resignation
Aylesbury	9 February 1857	Richard Bethell	Whig	Richard Bethell	Whig	Attorney General for England and Wales
Salford	2 February 1857	Joseph Brotherton	Whig	Edward Ryley Langworthy	Independent Whig	Death
Lanarkshire	9 January 1857	William Lockhart	Conservative	Alexander Baillie-Cochrane	Conservative	Death
East Suffolk	26 December 1856	Sir Edward Gooch	Conservative	The Lord Henniker	Conservative	Death
County Kerry	9 August 1856	Viscount Castlerosse	Whig	Viscount Castlerosse	Whig	Comptroller of the Household
Nottingham	30 July 1856	Edward Strutt	Whig	Charles Paget	Whig	Resignation and elevation to the peerage
Dorset	26 July 1856	George Bankes	Conservative	Henry Sturt	Conservative	Death
Frome	23 July 1856	Viscount Dungarvan	Whig	William George Boyle	Whig	Succession to a peerage
Dorchester	22 July 1856	Henry Sturt	Conservative	Charles Napier Sturt	Conservative	Resignation in order to contest Dorset
Calne	9 July 1856	Earl of Shelburne	Whig	Sir William Fenwick Williams	Whig	Resignation and elevation to the House of Lords through a Writ of acceleration
Leicester	18 June 1856	Richard Gardner	Whig	John Biggs	Whig	Death
Lichfield	30 May 1856	The Lord Waterpark	Whig	Viscount Sandon	Independent Whig	Resignation
County Longford	13 May 1856	Richard Maxwell Fox	Whig	Henry George Hughes	Whig	Death
Cheltenham	8 May 1856	Grenville Berkeley	Whig	Francis Berkeley	Whig	Resignation
Athlone	14 April 1856	William Keogh	Whig	Henry Handcock	Conservative	Resignation (Judge of the Court of Common Pleas)
Chippenham	9 April 1856	Joseph Neeld	Conservative	Robert Parry Nisbet	Conservative	Death
Ennis	8 April 1856	John David FitzGerald	Whig	John David FitzGerald	Whig	Attorney-General for Ireland
Boston	7 March 1856	Gilbert Heathcote	Whig	Herbert Ingram	Whig	Resignation in order to contest Rutlandshire
Rutlandshire	4 March 1856	Sir Gilbert Heathcote	Whig	Gilbert Heathcote	Whig	Resignation and elevation to the peerage
Leominster	19 February 1856	George Arkwright	Conservative	Gathorne Hardy	Conservative	Death
New Ross	18 February 1856	Charles Gavan Duffy	Independent Irish	Charles Tottenham	Conservative	Resignation
Cambridge University	11 February 1856	Henry Goulburn	Conservative	Spencer Horatio Walpole	Conservative	Death
Wigtownshire	9 February 1856	Viscount Dalrymple	Whig	Sir Andrew Agnew	Whig	Resignation
Edinburgh	9 February 1856	Thomas Babington Macaulay	Whig	Adam Black	Whig	Resignation
Sligo Borough	8 February 1856	John Sadleir	Whig	John Arthur Wynne	Conservative	Death
Rochester	8 February 1856	Francis Child Villiers	Conservative	Philip Wykeham Martin	Whig	Resignation
Tamworth	7 February 1856	John Townshend	Whig	Viscount Raynham	Whig	Succession to a peerage
Midhurst	7 February 1856	Spencer Horatio Walpole	Conservative	Samuel Warren	Conservative	Resignation in order to contest Cambridge University
Leeds	6 February 1856	Matthew Talbot Baines	Whig	Matthew Talbot Baines	Whig	Chancellor of the Duchy of Lancaster
Taunton	5 February 1856	Henry Labouchere	Whig	Henry Labouchere	Whig	Secretary of State for the Colonies
Newcastle upon Tyne	5 February 1856	John Fenwick Burgoyne Blackett	Whig	George Ridley	Whig	Resignation
Lincoln	16 January 1856	Charles Delaet Waldo Sibthorp	Conservative	Gervaise Tottenham Waldo Sibthorp	Conservative	Death
County Meath	17 December 1855	Frederick Lucas	Independent Irish	Edward McEvoy	Independent Irish	Death
Armagh City	6 December 1855	Ross Stephenson Moore	Conservative	Joshua Bond	Conservative	Death
Wells	21 November 1855	Robert Charles Tudway	Conservative	Hedworth Hylton Jolliffe	Conservative	Death
Southwark	20 November 1855	Sir William Molesworth	Radical	Charles Napier	Whig	Death
Totnes	5 November 1855	Lord Seymour	Whig	Earl of Gifford	Whig	Succession to a peerage
Huntingdonshire	23 October 1855	Viscount Mandeville	Conservative	James Rust	Conservative	Succession to a peerage
Kilmarnock Burghs	16 August 1855	Edward Pleydell-Bouverie	Whig	Edward Pleydell-Bouverie	Whig	President of the Poor Law Board
Kidderminster	14 August 1855	Robert Lowe	Whig	Robert Lowe	Whig	Vice-President of the Board of Trade and Paymaster General
Hertford	14 August 1855	William Cowper	Whig	William Cowper	Whig	President of the Board of Health
Marylebone	28 July 1855	Sir Benjamin Hall	Peelite	Sir Benjamin Hall	Peelite	First Commissioner of Works
Southwark	27 July 1855	Sir William Molesworth	Radical	Sir William Molesworth	Radical	Secretary of State for the Colonies
East Norfolk	17 July 1855	Edmond Wodehouse	Conservative	Sir Henry Stracey	Conservative	Resignation
Cheltenham	14 July 1855	Craven Berkeley	Whig	Grenville Berkeley	Whig	Death
Evesham	11 July 1855	Grenville Berkeley	Whig	Edward Holland	Whig	Resignation in order to contest Cheltenham
Bath	5 June 1855	Thomas Phinn	Whig	William Tite	Whig	Resignation
Renfrewshire	14 May 1855	William Mure	Conservative	Sir Michael Shaw-Stewart	Conservative	Resignation
County Cork	23 April 1855	Edmond Roach	Whig	Rickard Deasy	Whig	Resignation and elevation to the Irish peerage
County Cavan	13 April 1855	Sir John Young	Peelite	Robert Burrowes	Conservative	Resignation (Lord High Commissioner of the Ionian Islands)
Kilmarnock Burghs	7 April 1855	Edward Pleydell-Bouverie	Whig	Edward Pleydell-Bouverie	Whig	Vice-President of the Board of Trade and Paymaster General
Lewes	5 April 1855	Henry Brand	Whig	Henry Brand	Whig	Junior Lord of the Treasury
Gloucester	31 March 1855	William Philip Price	Whig	William Philip Price	Whig	Seeks re-election after his firm was granted a contract to supply huts to the army in the Crimea
Liverpool	29 March 1855	Henry Thomas Liddell	Conservative	Joseph Christopher Ewart	Whig	Succession to a peerage
Wilton	28 March 1855	Charles A'Court	Whig	Edmund Antrobus	Whig	Resignation (Special Commissioner of Property and Income Tax)
Tamworth	14 March 1855	Sir Robert Peel	Peelite	Sir Robert Peel	Peelite	Civil Lord of the Admiralty
Portsmouth	14 March 1855	The Viscount Monck	Whig	The Viscount Monck	Whig	Junior Lord of the Treasury
Forfarshire	10 March 1855	Viscount Duncan	Whig	Viscount Duncan	Whig	Junior Lord of the Treasury
Barnstaple	10 March 1855	John Laurie	Conservative	George Buck	Conservative	Void By-Election
Montrose Burghs	9 March 1855	Joseph Hume	Whig	William Edward Baxter	Whig	Death
Ennis	8 March 1855	John David FitzGerald	Independent Irish	John David FitzGerald	Whig	Solicitor-General for Ireland
Dudley	8 March 1855	John Benbow	Conservative	Sir Stafford Northcote	Conservative	Death
Athlone	7 March 1855	William Keogh	Whig	William Keogh	Whig	Attorney-General for Ireland
Stroud	6 March 1855	Edward Horsman	Whig	Edward Horsman	Whig	Chief Secretary for Ireland
Stirlingshire	5 March 1855	William Forbes	Conservative	Peter Blackburn	Conservative	Death
Radnor Boroughs	5 March 1855	George Cornewall Lewis	Whig	George Cornewall Lewis	Whig	Chancellor of the Exchequer
Northampton	5 March 1855	Robert Vernon Smith	Whig	Robert Vernon Smith	Whig	President of the Board of Control
Halifax	3 March 1855	Sir Charles Wood	Whig	Sir Charles Wood	Whig	First Lord of the Admiralty
City of London	3 March 1855	Lord John Russell	Whig	Lord John Russell	Whig	Secretary of State for the Colonies
Swansea District	27 February 1855	John Henry Vivian	Whig	Lewis Llewelyn Dillwyn	Whig	Death
Cardigan Boroughs	24 February 1855	Pryse Loveden	Whig	John Lloyd Davies	Conservative	Death
South Wiltshire	15 February 1855	Sidney Herbert	Peelite	Sidney Herbert	Peelite	Secretary of State for the Colonies
Windsor	14 February 1855	Lord Charles Wellesley	Conservative	Samson Ricardo	Whig	Resignation
Tiverton	12 February 1855	The Viscount Palmerston	Whig	The Viscount Palmerston	Whig	Prime Minister and First Lord of the Treasury
Radnor Boroughs	8 February 1855	Sir Thomas Frankland Lewis	Whig	George Cornewall Lewis	Whig	Death
Sunderland	2 January 1855	William Digby Seymour	Whig	Henry Fenwick	Whig	Recorder of Newcastle
Ayrshire	30 December 1854	James Hunter Blair	Conservative	Sir James Fergusson	Conservative	Death
Norwich	29 December 1854	Samuel Morton Peto	Whig	Samuel Bignold	Conservative	Resignation
County Fermanagh	29 December 1854	Sir Arthur Brooke	Conservative	Henry Cole	Conservative	Death
County Antrim	27 December 1854	Edward William Pakenham	Conservative	Thomas Henry Pakenham	Conservative	Death
County Limerick	26 December 1854	Wyndham Goold	Whig	Stephen de Vere	Whig	Death
Marylebone	20 December 1854	Lord Dudley Stuart	Whig	Viscount Ebrington	Whig	Death
East Gloucestershire	19 December 1854	Sir Michael Hicks Beach	Conservative	Robert Stayner Holford	Conservative	Death
Abingdon	13 December 1854	Lord Norreys	Whig	Joseph Haythorne Reed	Whig	Succession to a peerage
Bedford	6 December 1854	Henry Stuart	Conservative	William Stuart	Conservative	Death
Coventry	2 December 1854	Charles Geach	Whig	Joseph Paxton	Whig	Death
Limerick City	28 October 1854	Robert Potter	Independent Irish	James O'Brien	Whig	Death
Frome	24 October 1854	Robert Edward Boyle	Whig	Viscount Dungarvan	Whig	Death
Forfarshire	11 October 1854	Lauderdale Maule	Whig	Viscount Duncan	Whig	Death
Wigan	3 October 1854	Ralph Anthony Thicknesse	Whig	Joseph Acton	Whig	Death
King's Lynn	16 September 1854	Viscount Jocelyn	Conservative	John Henry Gurney	Whig	Death
Barnstaple	25 August 1854	Richard Bremridge	Conservative	John Laurie	Conservative	Void election
Barnstaple	25 August 1854	Sir William Fraser	Conservative	Richard Samuel Guinness	Conservative	Void election
Aberdeenshire	22 August 1854	William Gordon	Conservative	Lord Haddo	Whig	Resignation
Kingston upon Hull	18 August 1854	Viscount Goderich	Whig	William Henry Watson	Whig	Void election
Kingston upon Hull	18 August 1854	James Clay	Whig	William Digby Seymour	Whig	Void election
Canterbury	18 August 1854	Henry Plumptre Gipps	Conservative	Charles Manners Lushington	Conservative	Void election
Canterbury	18 August 1854	Henry Butler-Johnstone	Conservative	Sir William Somerville	Whig	Void election
Cambridge	18 August 1854	Kenneth Macaulay	Conservative	Robert Adair	Whig	Void election
Cambridge	18 August 1854	John Harvey Astell	Conservative	Francis Mowatt	Whig	Void election
Maldon	17 August 1854	Charles Du Cane	Conservative	George Sandford	Conservative	Void election
Maldon	17 August 1854	Taverner John Miller	Conservative	John Bramley-Moore	Conservative	Void election
Marylebone	16 August 1854	Sir Benjamin Hall	Whig	Sir Benjamin Hall	Whig	President of the Board of Health
Cockermouth	9 August 1854	Henry Aglionby Aglionby	Whig	John Steel	Whig	Death
Beverley	31 July 1854	Francis Charles Lawley	Whig	Arthur Hamilton-Gordon	Whig	Resignation
Morpeth	17 June 1854	Sir George Grey	Whig	Sir George Grey	Whig	Secretary of State for the Colonies
City of London	14 June 1854	Lord John Russell	Whig	Lord John Russell	Whig	Lord President of the Council
Hertfordshire	24 May 1854	Thomas Plumer Halsey	Conservative	Abel Smith, Jnr	Conservative	Death
Devonport	11 May 1854	Henry Tufnell	Whig	Thomas Erskine Perry	Whig	Resignation
Hastings	10 May 1854	Musgrave Brisco	Conservative	Frederick North	Whig	Resignation
Lichfield	9 May 1854	Viscount Anson	Whig	The Lord Waterpark	Whig	Succession to a peerage
Flintshire	8 May 1854	Edward Lloyd-Mostyn	Whig	Thomas Lloyd-Mostyn	Whig	Succession to a peerage
Southampton	12 April 1854	Alexander Cockburn	Whig	Alexander Cockburn	Whig	Recorder of Bristol
North Durham	1 April 1854	Viscount Seaham	Conservative	Lord Adolphus Vane-Tempest	Conservative	Succession to a peerage
Westmorland	31 March 1854	William Thompson	Conservative	Earl of Bective	Conservative	Death
Tynemouth and North Shields	30 March 1854	Hugh Taylor	Conservative	William Schaw Lindsay	Whig	Void election
Liskeard	29 March 1854	Richard Budden Crowder	Whig	Ralph William Grey	Whig	Resignation (Judge of the Court of Common Pleas)
Louth	27 February 1854	Chichester Fortescue	Whig	Chichester Fortescue	Whig	Junior Lord of the Treasury
Cardiganshire	22 February 1854	William Edward Powell	Conservative	The Earl of Lisburne	Conservative	Resignation
South Devon	14 February 1854	Sir Ralph Lopes	Conservative	Lawrence Palk	Conservative	Death
West Sussex	13 February 1854	Richard Prime	Conservative	Henry Wyndham	Conservative	Resignation
South Staffordshire	8 February 1854	Viscount Lewisham	Conservative	Lord Paget	Whig	Succession to a peerage
South Shropshire	8 February 1854	Robert Clive	Conservative	Robert Windsor-Clive	Conservative	Death
Oxford University	7 February 1854	Robert Inglis	Conservative	Sir William Heathcote,	Conservative	Resignation
Ludlow	7 February 1854	Robert Windsor-Clive	Conservative	Percy Egerton Herbert	Conservative	Resignation in order to contest South Shropshire
Brecon	6 February 1854	Charles Rodney Morgan	Conservative	John Lloyd Vaughan Watkins	Whig	Death
East Gloucestershire	9 January 1854	Marquess of Worcester	Conservative	Sir Michael Hicks Beach	Conservative	Succession to a peerage
Clonmel	21 December 1853	Cecil Lawless	Independent Irish	John O'Connell	Whig	Death
South Warwickshire	3 December 1853	Lord Brooke	Whig	Evelyn Shirley	Whig	Succession to a peerage
Salisbury	15 November 1853	Charles Baring Wall	Whig	Edward Pery Buckley	Whig	Death
Lisburn	14 October 1853	Roger Johnson Smyth	Peelite	Jonathan Joseph Richardson	Whig	Death
Dungarvan	26 August 1853	John Francis Maguire	Independent Irish	John Francis Maguire	Independent Irish	Seeks re-election upon becoming Mayor of Cork
Clitheroe	23 August 1853	John Thomas Walshman Aspinall	Conservative	Le Gendre Starkie	Whig	Void By-Election
Stamford	22 August 1853	John Charles Herries	Conservative	Lord Robert Cecil	Conservative	Resignation
Cork City	20 August 1853	Francis Murphy	Whig	Francis Beamish	Whig	Resignation (Commissioner for the Relief of Insolvent Debtors in England)
South Staffordshire	15 August 1853	George Anson	Whig	Edward Littleton	Whig	Resignation
North Derbyshire	22 July 1853	William Evans	Whig	William Pole Thornhill	Independent Whig	Resignation
West Cornwall	18 July 1853	Edward Wynne-Pendarves	Whig	Michael Williams	Whig	Death
Liverpool	9 July 1853	Charles Turner	Conservative	Thomas Horsfall	Conservative	Void election
Liverpool	9 July 1853	William Forbes Mackenzie	Conservative	Henry Liddell	Conservative	Void election
Sligo Borough	8 July 1853	Charles Towneley	Independent Irish	John Sadleir	Whig	Void election
Tralee	4 July 1853	Maurice O'Connell	Whig	Daniel O'Connell Jnr	Whig	Death
Clare	4 July 1853	John Forster FitzGerald	Whig	John Forster FitzGerald	Whig	Void election
Clare	4 July 1853	Cornelius O'Brien	Independent Irish	Cornelius O'Brien	Independent Irish	Void election
Stroud	28 June 1853	Lord Moreton	Whig	Edward Horsman	Whig	Succession to a peerage
Peterborough	25 June 1853	George Hammond Whalley	Whig	George Hammond Whalley	Whig	Void By-Election
Peterborough	25 June 1853	George Hammond Whalley	Whig	Thomson Hankey	Whig	By-election result reversed on petition
Edinburghshire	25 June 1853	John Hope	Conservative	Earl of Dalkeith	Conservative	Void election
City Durham	25 June 1853	Lord Adolphus Vane	Conservative	John Mowbray	Conservative	Void By-Election
Chatham	23 June 1853	John Mark Frederick Smith	Conservative	Leicester Viney Vernon	Conservative	Void election
Harwich	21 June 1853	George Sandford	Conservative	John Bagshaw	Whig	Void election
Plymouth	2 June 1853	Charles John Mare	Conservative	Roundell Palmer	Conservative	Void election
Clitheroe	28 May 1853	Mathew Wilson	Whig	John Thomas Walshman Aspinall	Conservative	Void election
Rye	23 May 1853	William Alexander Mackinnon (younger)	Whig	William Alexander Mackinnon (elder)	Whig	Void election
Maidstone	16 May 1853	George Dodd	Conservative	William Lee	Whig	Void election
Berwick-upon-Tweed	14 May 1853	John Stapleton	Whig	Dudley Marjoribanks	Whig	Void election
Berwick-upon-Tweed	14 May 1853	Matthew Forster	Whig	John Forster	Whig	Void election
Taunton	4 May 1853	Arthur Mills	Conservative	Sir John Ramsden	Whig	Void election
County Carlow	25 April 1853	Henry Bruen	Conservative	William McClintock-Bunbury	Conservative	Death
Athlone	23 April 1853	William Keogh	Independent Irish	William Keogh	Whig	Solicitor-General for Ireland
Huddersfield	22 April 1853	William Rookes Crompton Stansfield	Whig	Viscount Goderich	Whig	Void election
Lancaster	12 April 1853	Robert Baynes Armstrong	Whig	Thomas Greene	Conservative	Void election
Blackburn	24 March 1853	William Eccles	Whig	Montague Joseph Feilden	Whig	Void election
Bridgnorth	22 March 1853	Sir Robert Pigot	Conservative	John Pritchard	Conservative	Void election
Frome	7 March 1853	Robert Edward Boyle	Whig	Robert Edward Boyle	Whig	Void election
West Worcestershire	28 February 1853	Henry Lygon	Conservative	Viscount Elmley	Conservative	Succession to a peerage
Forfarshire	25 February 1853	Lauderdale Maule	Whig	Lauderdale Maule	Whig	Surveyor-General of the Ordnance
Oxford University	20 January 1853	William Ewart Gladstone	Peelite	William Ewart Gladstone	Peelite	Chancellor of the Exchequer
Carlow Borough	20 January 1853	John Sadleir	Independent Irish	John Alexander	Conservative	Junior Lord of the Treasury
County Limerick	12 January 1853	William Monsell	Whig	William Monsell	Whig	Clerk of the Ordnance
Dumfriesshire	12 January 1853	Viscount Drumlanrig	Peelite	Viscount Drumlanrig	Peelite	Comptroller of the Household
South Wiltshire	11 January 1853	Sidney Herbert	Peelite	Sidney Herbert	Peelite	Secretary at War
Haddingtonshire	11 January 1853	Lord Elcho	Peelite	Lord Elcho	Peelite	Junior Lord of the Treasury
County Cavan	10 January 1853	Sir John Young	Peelite	Sir John Young	Peelite	Chief Secretary for Ireland
Southampton	7 January 1853	Sir Alexander Cockburn	Whig	Sir Alexander Cockburn	Whig	Attorney General for England and Wales
Aylesbury	6 January 1853	Richard Bethell	Whig	Richard Bethell	Whig	Solicitor General for England and Wales
Lichfield	5 January 1853	Lord Alfred Paget	Whig	Lord Alfred Paget	Whig	Chief Equerry and Clerk Marshal
Halifax	5 January 1853	Charles Wood	Whig	Charles Wood	Whig	President of the Board of Control
Wolverhampton	4 January 1853	Charles Pelham Villiers	Whig	Charles Pelham Villiers	Whig	Judge Advocate General
Oxford	4 January 1853	William Wood	Whig	Edward Cardwell	Peelite	Resignation (Vice Chancellor of the High Court)
Marlborough	4 January 1853	Lord Ernest Bruce	Peelite	Lord Ernest Bruce	Peelite	Vice-Chamberlain of the Household
Leith Burghs	4 January 1853	James Moncreiff	Whig	James Moncreiff	Whig	Lord Advocate
Gloucester	4 January 1853	Maurice Berkeley	Whig	Maurice Berkeley	Whig	Second Sea Lord
Brighton	4 January 1853	Lord Alfred Hervey	Peelite	Lord Alfred Hervey	Peelite	Junior Lord of the Treasury
Tiverton	3 January 1853	The Viscount Palmerston	Whig	The Viscount Palmerston	Whig	Home Secretary
Carlisle	3 January 1853	Matthew Talbot Baines	Whig	Matthew Talbot Baines	Whig	President of the Poor Law Board
City of London	3 January 1853	Lord John Russell	Whig	Lord John Russell	Whig	Foreign Secretary
Scarborough	1 January 1853	Earl of Mulgrave	Whig	Earl of Mulgrave	Whig	Treasurer of the Household
Nottingham	1 January 1853	Edward Strutt	Whig	Edward Strutt	Whig	Chancellor of the Duchy of Lancaster
Morpeth	1 January 1853	Edward Granville George Howard	Whig	Sir George Grey	Whig	Resignation
Hertford	1 January 1853	William Cowper	Whig	William Cowper	Whig	Civil Lord of the Admiralty
Carlisle	1 January 1853	Sir James Graham	Peelite	Sir James Graham	Peelite	First Lord of the Admiralty
Southwark	1 January 1853	Sir William Molesworth	Radical	Sir William Molesworth	Radical	First Commissioner of Works
Merthyr Tydfil	14 December 1852	John Josiah Guest	Whig	Henry Bruce	Whig	Death
Lisburn	11 December 1852	James Emerson Tennent	Conservative	Roger Johnson Smyth	Peelite	Resignation
Peterborough	6 December 1852	Richard Watson	Whig	George Hammond Whalley	Whig	Death
Bury St Edmunds	4 December 1852	John Stuart	Conservative	James Henry Porteous Oakes	Conservative	Resignation (Vice Chancellor)
Oldham	3 December 1852	John Duncuft	Conservative	William Johnson Fox	Whig	Death
City Durham	3 December 1852	Thomas Colpitts Granger	Whig	Lord Adolphus Vane	Conservative	Death
Abingdon	3 December 1852	James Caulfeild	Whig	Lord Norreys	Whig	Death
=== 15th Parliament (1847–1852) ===
By-election	Date	Former incumbent	Party	Winner	Party	Cause
Huntingdonshire	11 June 1852 (Note: An uncontested by-election.)	George Thornhill	Conservative	Viscount Mandeville	Conservative	Death
Sandwich	28 May 1852	Charles William Grenfell	Whig	Lord Charles Clinton	Conservative	Resignation in order to contest Windsor
Windsor	22 May 1852	George Alexander Reid	Conservative	Charles William Grenfell	Whig	Death
Perth	15 May 1852	Fox Maule	Whig	Arthur Kinnaird	Whig	Succession to a peerage
Carmarthenshire	13 May 1852	George Rice-Trevor	Conservative	David Jones	Conservative	Succession to a peerage
Harwich	8 May 1852	Fitzroy Kelly	Conservative	Isaac Butt	Conservative	Resignation in order to contest East Suffolk
East Suffolk	1 May 1852	The Lord Rendlesham	Conservative	Fitzroy Kelly	Conservative	Death
Worcester	28 April 1852	Francis Rufford	Conservative	William Laslett	Whig	Resignation
Tavistock	28 April 1852	John Salusbury-Trelawny	Whig	Samuel Carter	Whig	Seeks re-election due to opposition from local party members
Harwich	10 April 1852	Robert Wigram Crawford	Whig	Fitzroy Kelly	Conservative	Void By-election
Monmouth Boroughs	3 April 1852	Reginald James Blewitt	Whig	Crawshay Bailey	Conservative	Resignation
Dungannon	24 March 1852	William Stuart Knox	Conservative	William Stuart Knox	Conservative	Parliamentary Groom in Waiting (Note: Seat vacated on appointment to the office noted.)
South Shropshire	23 March 1852	Viscount Newport	Conservative	Viscount Newport	Conservative	Vice-Chamberlain of the Household
County Cork	22 March 1852	Maurice Power	Repeal	Vincent Scully	Repeal	Resignation (Governor of St. Lucia)
Coleraine	22 March 1852 (Note: Naas sought re-election at Coleraine.)	John Boyd	Conservative	Lord Naas	Conservative	Resignation to provide a seat for Lord Naas
East Retford	19 March 1852	The Viscount Galway	Conservative	The Viscount Galway	Conservative	Lord-in-waiting
County Londonderry	13 March 1852	Thomas Bateson	Conservative	Thomas Bateson	Conservative	Junior Lord of the Treasury
North Lincolnshire	13 March 1852	Robert Adam Christopher	Conservative	Robert Adam Christopher	Conservative	Resignation pending appointment as Chancellor of the Duchy of Lancaster
County Kildare	13 March 1852	Lord Naas	Conservative	William Henry Ford Cogan	Whig	Chief Secretary for Ireland
County Tyrone	12 March 1852	Lord Claud Hamilton	Conservative	Lord Claud Hamilton	Conservative	Treasurer of the Household
South Lincolnshire	12 March 1852	Sir John Trollope	Conservative	Sir John Trollope	Conservative	President of the Poor Law Board
Buckinghamshire	12 March 1852	Benjamin Disraeli	Conservative	Benjamin Disraeli	Conservative	Chancellor of the Exchequer
Oxfordshire	10 March 1852	Joseph Warner Henley	Conservative	Joseph Warner Henley	Conservative	President of the Board of Trade
East Riding of Yorkshire	9 March 1852	Arthur Duncombe	Conservative	Arthur Duncombe	Conservative	Fourth Naval Lord
North Essex	9 March 1852	William Beresford	Conservative	William Beresford	Conservative	Secretary at War
Enniskillen	9 March 1852	James Whiteside	Conservative	James Whiteside	Conservative	Solicitor-General for Ireland
Dublin University	9 March 1852	Joseph Napier	Conservative	Joseph Napier	Conservative	Attorney-General for Ireland
Dorset	9 March 1852	George Bankes	Conservative	George Bankes	Conservative	Judge Advocate General
Portarlington	8 March 1852	Francis Plunkett Dunne	Conservative	Francis Plunkett Dunne	Conservative	Clerk of the Ordnance
Stamford	6 March 1852	John Charles Herries	Conservative	John Charles Herries	Conservative	President of the Board of Control
Midhurst	5 March 1852	Spencer Horatio Walpole	Conservative	Spencer Horatio Walpole	Conservative	Home Secretary
Buckingham	5 March 1852	Marquess of Chandos	Conservative	Marquess of Chandos	Conservative	Junior Lord of the Treasury
Abingdon	5 March 1852	Sir Frederic Thesiger	Conservative	Sir Frederic Thesiger	Conservative	Attorney General for England and Wales
Droitwich	4 March 1852	Sir John Pakington	Conservative	Sir John Pakington	Conservative	Secretary of State for War and the Colonies
Colchester	4 March 1852	Lord John Manners	Conservative	Lord John Manners	Conservative	First Commissioner of Works
Chichester	4 March 1852	Lord Henry Lennox	Conservative	Lord Henry Lennox	Conservative	Junior Lord of the Treasury
Wenlock	3 March 1852	George Weld-Forester	Conservative	George Weld-Forester	Conservative	Comptroller of the Household
East Kent	16 February 1852	John Pemberton Plumptre	Conservative	Sir Brook Bridges	Conservative	Resignation
Kinsale	12 February 1852	Benjamin Hawes	Whig	John Isaac Heard	Whig	Resignation
Northampton	11 February 1852	Robert Vernon Smith	Whig	Robert Vernon Smith	Whig	Secretary at War
Greenwich	11 February 1852	James Whitley Deans Dundas	Whig	Houston Stewart	Whig	Resignation
East Retford	11 February 1852	Arthur Duncombe	Conservative	William Ernest Duncombe	Conservative	Resignation in order to contest East Riding of Yorkshire
Perth	9 February 1852	Fox Maule	Whig	Fox Maule	Whig	President of the Board of Control
Lisburn	5 January 1852	Horace Seymour	Peelite	James Emerson Tennent	Conservative	Death
Bradford	21 October 1851	Robert Milligan	Whig	William Busfeild	Whig	Death
East Riding of Yorkshire	7 October 1851	Henry Broadley	Conservative	Arthur Duncombe	Conservative	Death
Downpatrick	8 August 1851	Richard Ker	Peelite	Charles Hardinge	Conservative	Resignation
Limerick City	1 August 1851	John O'Connell	Repeal	Earl of Arundel	Independent Whig	Resignation
Scarborough	19 July 1851	Earl of Mulgrave	Whig	George Frederick Young	Conservative	Comptroller of the Household
Arundel	16 July 1851	Earl of Arundel	Whig	Edward Strutt	Whig	Resignation in order to contest Limerick City
Knaresborough	12 July 1851	William Lascelles	Whig	Thomas Collins	Conservative	Death
Greenwich	28 June 1851	Edward George Barnard	Whig	David Salomons	Whig	Death
Bath	25 June 1851	Lord Ashley	Conservative	George Treweeke Scobell	Whig	Succession to a peerage
Clackmannanshire and Kinross-shire	9 June 1851	Sir William Morison	Whig	James Johnstone	Whig	Death
Argyllshire	6 June 1851	Duncan McNeill	Conservative	Sir Archibald Islay Campbell	Conservative	Resignation (Senator of the College of Justice)
Newry	30 May 1851	Viscount Newry	Peelite	Edmund Gilling Hallewell	Conservative	Death
Isle of Wight	29 May 1851	John Simeon	Whig	Edward Dawes	Whig	Resignation
Harwich	28 May 1851	Henry Thoby Prinsep	Conservative	Robert Wigram Crawford	Whig	Void By-Election
Cork City	23 April 1851	William Trant Fagan	Repeal	Francis Murphy	Whig	Resignation
Boston	22 April 1851	Dudley Pelham	Whig	James William Freshfield	Conservative	Death
County Longford	21 April 1851	Samuel Wensley Blackall	Repeal	Richard More O'Ferrall	Whig	Resignation (Governor of Dominica)
Leith Burghs	14 April 1851	Andrew Rutherfurd	Whig	James Moncreiff	Whig	Resignation (Judge of the Court of Session)
Enniskillen	12 April 1851	Henry Arthur Cole	Conservative	James Whiteside	Conservative	Resignation
Aylesbury	11 April 1851	Frederick Calvert	Whig	Richard Bethell	Whig	Void By-Election
West Somerset	10 April 1851	Sir Alexander Hood	Conservative	William Gore-Langton	Conservative	Death
Coventry	8 April 1851	George James Turner	Conservative	Charles Ponsonby	Whig	Resignation (Vice Chancellor)
Oxford	3 April 1851	William Page Wood	Whig	William Page Wood	Whig	Solicitor General for England and Wales
Southampton	2 April 1851	Alexander Cockburn	Whig	Alexander Cockburn	Whig	Attorney General for England and Wales
Devonport	2 April 1851	John Romilly	Whig	John Romilly	Whig	Master of the Rolls
Dungarvan	22 March 1851	Richard Lalor Sheil	Whig	Charles Ponsonby	Whig	Resignation (Minister to Tuscany)
Thirsk	21 March 1851	John Bell	Conservative	Sir William Payne-Gallwey	Conservative	Death
Harwich	5 March 1851	Sir John Hobhouse	Whig	Henry Thoby Prinsep	Conservative	Resignation and elevation to the peerage
Glamorganshire	25 February 1851	The Earl of Dunraven	Conservative	Sir George Tyler	Conservative	Resignation
Bedfordshire	24 February 1851	Viscount Alford	Conservative	Richard Gilpin	Conservative	Death
North Staffordshire	22 February 1851	Viscount Brackley	Conservative	Sir Smith Child	Conservative	Resignation
South Nottinghamshire	17 February 1851	Robert Bromley	Conservative	William Hodgson Barrow	Conservative	Death
Falkirk Burghs	14 February 1851	Earl of Lincoln	Conservative	James Baird	Conservative	Succession to a peerage
Dungannon	14 February 1851	Viscount Northland	Conservative	William Stuart Knox	Conservative	Resignation
Pontefract	13 February 1851	Samuel Martin	Whig	Beilby Lawley	Whig	Resignation (Baron of the Exchequer)
Windsor	10 February 1851	John Hatchell	Whig	John Hatchell	Whig	Attorney-General for Ireland
Aylesbury	27 December 1850	The Lord Nugent	Whig	Frederick Calvert	Whig	Death
St Albans	24 December 1850 (Note: Seat abolished 3 May 1852.)	Alexander Raphael	Whig	Jacob Bell	Whig	Death
County Limerick	14 December 1850	Samuel Dickson	Whig	Wyndham Goold	Whig	Death
Herefordshire	18 October 1850	Joseph Bailey	Conservative	Thomas William Booker-Blakemore	Conservative	Death
Montgomeryshire	11 October 1850	Charles Williams-Wynn	Conservative	Herbert Williams-Wynn	Conservative	Death
Cambridge University	4 October 1850	Charles Law	Conservative	Loftus Wigram	Conservative	Death
Poole	24 September 1850	George Richard Robinson	Conservative	Henry Danby Seymour	Whig	Death
Lambeth	7 August 1850	Charles Pearson	Whig	William Williams	Whig	Resignation
Dungannon	3 August 1850	Viscount Northland	Conservative	Viscount Northland	Conservative	Resigned seat and was re-elected without his knowledge or consent
County Mayo	29 July 1850	Robert Dillon Browne	Repeal	George Gore Ousley Higgins	Whig	Death
Chester	22 July 1850	John Jervis	Whig	William Owen Stanley	Whig	Resignation
Tamworth	19 July 1850	Sir Robert Peel	Peelite	Sir Robert Peel	Peelite	Death
Southampton	17 July 1850	Alexander Cockburn	Whig	Alexander Cockburn	Whig	Solicitor General for England and Wales
Devonport	17 July 1850	Sir John Romilly	Whig	Sir John Romilly	Whig	Attorney General for England and Wales
Lymington	30 April 1850	George Keppel	Whig	Edward John Hutchins	Whig	Resignation
Totnes	30 March 1850	Lord Seymour	Whig	Lord Seymour	Whig	First Commissioner of Woods and Forests
County Sligo	12 March 1850	John Ffolliott	Conservative	Sir Robert Gore-Booth	Conservative	Resignation
Canterbury	4 March 1850	Albert Denison	Whig	Frederick Romilly	Whig	Resignation and elevation to the peerage
Kirkcudbrightshire	20 February 1850	Thomas Maitland	Whig	John Mackie	Whig	Resignation (Judge of the Court of Session)
Colchester	9 February 1850	George Henry Smyth	Conservative	Lord John Manners	Conservative	Resignation
Windsor	6 February 1850	Lord John Hay	Whig	John Hatchell	Whig	Resignation
New Shoreham	28 December 1849	Charles Goring	Conservative	Lord Alexander Gordon-Lennox	Conservative	Death
Cork City	14 November 1849	Daniel Callaghan	Repeal	James Charles Chatterton	Conservative	Death
West Surrey	27 September 1849	William Denison	Whig	William John Evelyn	Conservative	Death
Kidderminster	5 September 1849	Richard Godson	Peelite	John Best	Peelite	Death
Reading	8 August 1849	Thomas Noon Talfourd	Whig	Viscount Chelsea	Conservative	Resignation (Puisne Judge of the Court of Common Pleas)
Boston	2 August 1849	Sir James Duke	Whig	Dudley Pelham	Whig	Resignation in order to contest City of London
City of London	27 July 1849	James Pattison	Whig	Sir James Duke	Whig	Death
City of London	4 July 1849	Lionel de Rothschild	Whig	Lionel de Rothschild	Whig	Seeks re-election following the rejection of the Jewish Disabilities Bill
South Warwickshire	7 June 1849	Evelyn Shirley	Conservative	Lord Guernsey	Conservative	Resignation
Sutherland	5 June 1849	Sir David Dundas	Whig	Sir David Dundas	Whig	Judge Advocate General
County Limerick	1 June 1849	William Smith O'Brien	Irish Confederate	Samuel Dickson	Whig	Disqualification (conviction for high treason)
Sheffield	3 May 1849	Henry George Ward	Whig	John Arthur Roebuck	Independent Whig	Resignation
South Nottinghamshire	17 April 1849	Lancelot Rolleston	Conservative	Robert Bromley	Conservative	Resignation
North Hampshire	6 April 1849	Sir William Heathcote	Conservative	Melville Portal	Conservative	Resignation
South Derbyshire	23 March 1849	Edward Miller Mundy	Conservative	William Mundy	Conservative	Death
County Donegal	20 February 1849	Edward Michael Conolly	Conservative	Thomas Conolly	Conservative	Death
South Staffordshire	19 February 1849	Viscount Ingestre	Conservative	Viscount Lewisham	Conservative	Succession to a peerage
South Devon	13 February 1849	Lord Courtenay	Conservative	Sir Ralph Lopes	Conservative	Resignation
Cardigan Boroughs	12 February 1849	Pryse Pryse	Whig	Pryse Loveden	Whig	Death
Bolton	9 February 1849	John Bowring	Whig	Joshua Walmsley	Whig	Resignation
Kingston upon Hull	7 February 1849	Matthew Talbot Baines	Whig	Matthew Talbot Baines	Whig	President of the Poor Law Board
Portsmouth	6 February 1849	Francis Baring	Whig	Francis Baring	Whig	First Lord of the Admiralty
Leominster	6 February 1849	Henry Barkly	Conservative	Frederick Peel	Conservative	Resignation (Governor of British Guiana)
Truro	11 January 1849	Edmund Turner	Whig	Humphrey Willyams	Whig	Death
Liskeard	3 January 1849	Charles Buller	Whig	Richard Budden Crowder	Whig	Death
King's Lynn	22 December 1848	Lord George Bentinck	Conservative	Edward Stanley	Conservative	Death
West Riding of Yorkshire	11 December 1848	Viscount Morpeth	Whig	Edmund Beckett	Conservative	Succession to a peerage
Bolton	12 September 1848	William Bolling	Conservative	Stephen Blair	Conservative	Death
Cheltenham	4 September 1848	Craven Berkeley	Whig	Grenville Berkeley	Whig	Void election
Leicester	2 September 1848	Joshua Walmsley	Whig	John Ellis	Whig	Void election
Leicester	2 September 1848	Richard Gardner	Whig	Richard Harris	Whig	Void election
Derby	2 September 1848	Frederick Leveson-Gower	Whig	Michael Thomas Bass	Whig	Void election
Derby	2 September 1848	Edward Strutt	Whig	Lawrence Heyworth	Whig	Void election
Thetford	8 August 1848	Bingham Baring	Conservative	Francis Baring	Conservative	Succession to a peerage
Sligo Borough	15 July 1848	Charles Towneley	Whig	John Patrick Somers	Repeal	Void By-Election
Great Yarmouth	8 July 1848	Lord Arthur Lennox	Conservative	Joseph Sandars	Conservative	Void election
Great Yarmouth	8 July 1848	Octavius Coope	Conservative	Charles Rumbold	Whig	Void election
Cheltenham	29 June 1848	Willoughby Jones	Conservative	Craven Berkeley	Whig	Void election
Horsham	28 June 1848	John Jervis	Whig	William Vesey-FitzGerald	Conservative	Void election
Horsham	28 June 1848	William Vesey-FitzGerald	Conservative	Lord Edward Howard	Whig	By-election result reversed on petition
North Cheshire	8 June 1848	Edward Stanley	Whig	George Legh	Conservative	Elevation to the peerage
York	24 May 1848	Henry Galgacus Redhead Yorke	Whig	William Milner	Whig	Death
Cirencester	24 May 1848	William Cripps	Conservative	Joseph Randolph Mullings	Conservative	Death
County Wicklow	27 April 1848	William Acton	Conservative	Ralph Howard	Whig	Resignation
Bewdley	18 April 1848	Thomas James Ireland	Conservative	Viscount Mandeville	Conservative	Void election
Sligo Borough	11 April 1848	John Patrick Somers	Repeal	Charles Towneley	Whig	Void election
Rye	6 April 1848	Herbert Mascall Curteis	Whig	Herbert Mascall Curteis	Whig	Void By-Election
Devonport	3 April 1848	John Romilly	Whig	John Romilly	Whig	Solicitor General for England and Wales
Harwich	1 April 1848	John Attwood	Conservative	Sir John Hobhouse	Whig	Void election
Aylesbury	29 March 1848	John Peter Deering	Conservative	Quintin Dick	Conservative	Void election
Monmouthshire	24 March 1848	Lord Granville Somerset	Conservative	Edward Arthur Somerset	Conservative	Death
Lincoln	16 March 1848	Charles Seely	Whig	Thomas Hobhouse	Whig	Void election
Carlisle	14 March 1848	William Nicholson Hodgson	Conservative	William Nicholson Hodgson	Conservative	Void election
Carlisle	14 March 1848	John Dixon	Whig	Philip Howard	Whig	Void election
Kinsale	11 March 1848	Richard Samuel Guinness	Conservative	Benjamin Hawes	Whig	Void election
Lancaster	9 March 1848	Samuel Gregson	Whig	Robert Baynes Armstrong	Whig	Void election
Waterford City	1 March 1848	Daniel O'Connell	Repeal	Sir Henry Barron	Whig	Resignation
Devizes	25 February 1848	William Heald Ludlow Bruges	Conservative	James Bucknall Bucknall Estcourt	Conservative	Resignation
Dublin University	19 February 1848	Frederick Shaw	Conservative	Joseph Napier	Conservative	Resignation
North Shropshire	16 February 1848	Viscount Clive	Conservative	John Whitehall Dod	Conservative	Succession to a peerage
Wells	27 December 1847	William Goodenough Hayter	Whig	William Goodenough Hayter	Whig	Judge Advocate General
Calne	27 December 1847	Earl of Shelburne	Whig	Earl of Shelburne	Whig	Junior Lord of the Treasury
Rye	23 December 1847	Herbert Barrett Curteis	Whig	Herbert Mascall Curteis	Whig	Death
Sunderland	22 December 1847	David Barclay	Whig	Sir Hedworth Williamson	Whig	Resignation
South Lancashire	20 December 1847	Charles Pelham Villiers	Whig	Alexander Henry	Whig	Double election, chose to sit for Wolverhampton
Tamworth	18 December 1847	William Yates Peel	Conservative	John Townshend	Whig	Resignation
Kilkenny City	18 December 1847	John O'Connell	Repeal	Michael Sullivan	Repeal	Double election, chose to sit for Limerick City
Stockport	16 December 1847	Richard Cobden	Radical	James Kershaw	Whig	Double election, chose to sit for the West Riding of Yorkshire
Weymouth and Melcombe Regis	15 December 1847	William Dougal Christie	Whig	Frederick Child Villiers	Conservative	Resignation (to avoid election petition)
Newcastle-under-Lyme	15 December 1847	Samuel Christy	Conservative	Samuel Christy	Conservative	Seeks re-election due to his firm holding a government contract
Edinburgh	15 December 1847	Charles Cowan	Whig	Charles Cowan	Whig	Disqualification (held government contract)
Liskeard	14 December 1847	Charles Buller	Whig	Charles Buller	Whig	President of the Poor Law Board
