= 1855 Cardigan Boroughs by-election =

UK parliamentary by-election

The 1855 Cardigan Boroughs by-election was fought in February 1855. The by-election arose because of the death of the incumbent Liberal MP, Pryse Loveden. It was won by the Conservative candidate John Lloyd Davies. Davies defeated the Liberal candidate, John Evans, former MP for Haverfordwest.

== Background ==
For nearly forty years, the seat had been held by members of the Pryse family of Gogerddan. Pryse Pryse served from 1816 until his death in 1849 and was succeeded by his son, Pryse Loveden. Loveden died in 1855 at an early age.

== Candidates ==
John Lloyd Davies was first in the field. There were also rumours that Thomas Lloyd of Bronwydd would be a candidate.

At the hustings at Cardigan, Lloyd Davies criticized his opponent for being the candidate of the Gogerddan interest, and stated that he would not have stood had a member of the Pryse family chosen to do so. He also expressed sympathy with those who objected to church rates. This may have gained sympathy in a traditionally Liberal seat

== Result ==
Davies secured a narrow majority of twelve votes. At the following General Election he was opposed by Edward Pryse and withdrew his candidature prior to the contest.
