= 1846 East Suffolk by-election =

1846 local election in East Suffolk, England

The 1846 East Suffolk by-election was held on 19 February 1846 after the resignation of the incumbent Peelite MP, John Henniker-Major. He was succeeded by the unopposed Protectionist Conservative candidate, Edward Sherlock Gooch who was backed by the other Suffolk MP, Lord Rendlesham.
