= John Henniker-Major =

John Henniker-Major may refer to:

- John Henniker-Major, 2nd Baron Henniker (1752–1821), British peer and MP
- John Henniker-Major, 3rd Baron Henniker (1777–1832), British peer and barrister
- John Henniker-Major, 4th Baron Henniker (1801–1870), also 1st Baron Hartismere, British peer and MP
- John Henniker-Major, 5th Baron Henniker (1842–1902), British peer and politician
- John Henniker-Major, 8th Baron Henniker (1916–2004), British peer, civil servant, and diplomat
