= 1874 East Suffolk by-election =

UK Parliamentary by-election

The 1874 East Suffolk by-election was fought on 20 March 1874. The by-election was fought due to the incumbent Conservative MP, Frederick Thellusson, 5th Baron Rendlesham, becoming Lord Commissioner of the Treasury. It was retained by the incumbent.
