= Michael Barne =

Explorer

Michael Barne (15 October 1877 – 31 May 1961) was an officer of the 1901-04 Discovery Expedition.

== Early life ==
Barne was born at Sotterley Park, Suffolk, the son of Frederick Barne and his wife, Lady Constance Adelaide Seymour, daughter of Francis Seymour, 5th Marquess of Hertford. His father was Member of Parliament for East Suffolk. He entered the Navy in 1892 and was rated Midshipman in 1894.

== Selected for "Discovery" ==
Sledge flag used by Barne in Antarctica during the Discovery Expedition

In 1901 he was appointed by Scott as Second Lieutenant to the Polar Expedition. Despite suffering frostbite Barne made copious notes throughout his three years with the expedition, both about general conditions and his specialist fields (magnetronemy and Soundings). Scott rated his ability to calm possible tensions highly. Barne Inlet, a 17-mile-wide (27 km) feature on the western side of the Ross Ice Shelf that he discovered, is named after him. He was awarded the Polar Medal for his contribution to the expedition.

== Post-Antarctic career ==
Marrying on his return from the Antarctic, Barne returned to active service with command of the destroyers Rocket, Porcupine and Coquette in succession. He still corresponded with Scott about modes of transport for future expeditions. In 1907 he was placed on the retired list. During the First World War, he was awarded the DSO while commanding the monitor M27. He was promoted commander on the retired list in 1917 and captain in 1922. During the next war Barne came out of retirement to command an anti-submarine patrol ship.

== Bibliography ==
- Barne, M. Need for Continuity in the Conduct of Antarctic Discovery The Geographical Journal, Vol. 27, No. 2 (Feb., 1906), p. 206 doi:10.2307/1776683
- Barne, M The National Antarctic Expedition The Geographical Journal, Vol. 18, No. 3 (Sep., 1901), pp. 275–279 doi:10.2307/1775133
- Barne, M MS 366 1902-03: Papers relating to Discovery Expedition GB/NNAF/P160000 (Former ISAAR ref: GB/NNAF/P1579) 1982 Cambridge University: Scott Polar Research Institute
- Fiennes, R Scott (Coronet, London, 2003) ISBN 0-340-82699-1
- Headland R.K.Journal of Polar Studies (1985) volume 2 part 1 p357-359 SPRI Antarctic Chronology, unpublished corrected revision of Chronological list of Antarctic expeditions and related historical events, (1 December 2001) Cambridge University Press (1989) ISBN 0-521-30903-4
- Holland, C. Manuscripts in the Scott Polar Research Institute, Cambridge, England - a catalogue. (Garland Publishing New York and London 1982) ISBN 0-8240-9394-1.
- Stonehouse, B (Ed) Encyclopaedia of Antarctica and the Southern Oceans, John Wiley & Sons, Chichester (2002) ISBN 0-471-98665-8
