= 1876 East Suffolk by-election =

UK Parliamentary by-election

The 1876 East Suffolk by-election was fought on 22 February 1876. The by-election was fought due to the succession to a peerage of the incumbent Conservative MP, Viscount Mahon. It was won by the Conservative candidate Frederick St John Barne.

East Suffolk by-election, 1876
Party	Candidate	Votes	%	±%
Conservative	Frederick St John Barne	4,708	46.3	
Liberal	Charles Easton	3,659	43.7	
Majority		951	2.6	
Turnout		8,367		
Conservative hold		Swing		
