= Edward Pryse =

British politician

Edward Pryse MP
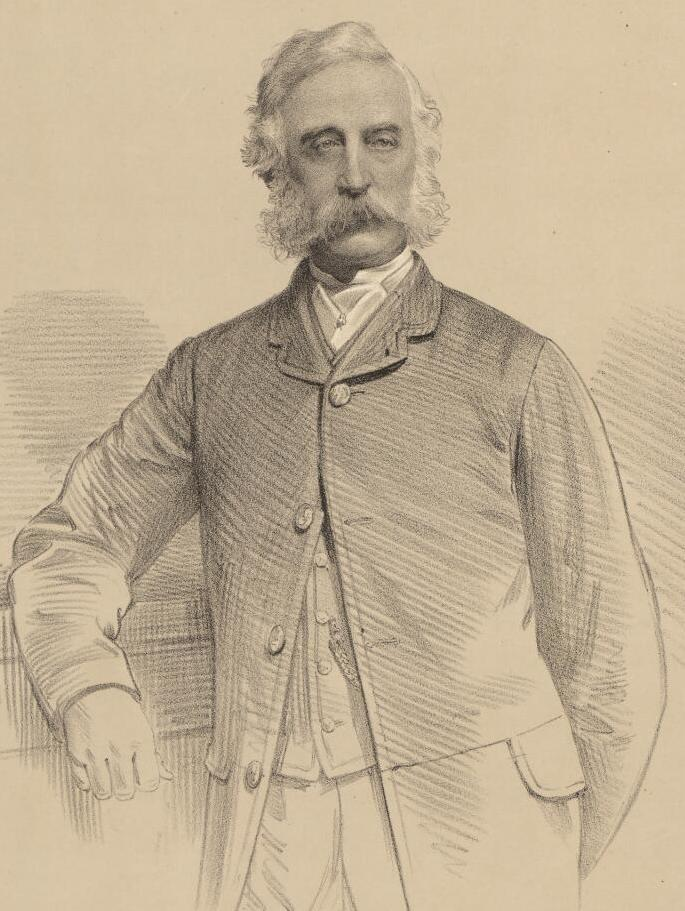

Member of Parliament for Cardigan Boroughs
- In office 27 March 1857 – 26 November 1868
- Preceded by: John Lloyd Davies
- Succeeded by: Thomas Lloyd

Personal details
- Born: 27 June 1817
- Died: 29 May 1888 (aged 70) Peithyll, Ceredigion
- Party: Liberal
- Parent(s): Pryse Pryse; Jane Cavallier
- Education: Eton College

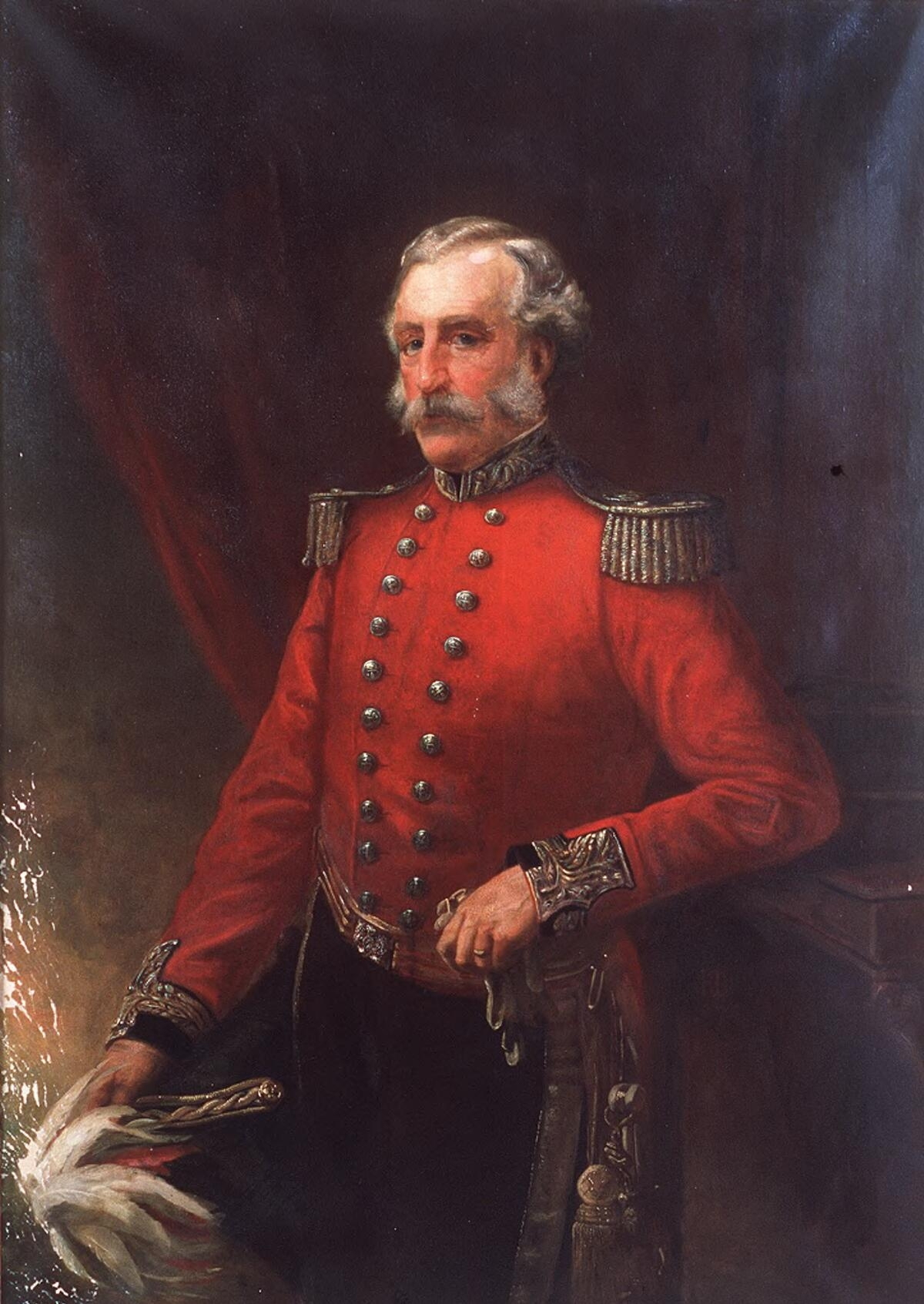
Portrait of Edward Lewis Pryse

Colonel Edward Lewis Pryse (27 June 1817 – 29 May 1888) was a British Liberal politician.

Pryse entered the military in 1836, before becoming captain of the Carabiniers (6th Dragoon Guards), and retiring in 1846. From 1857 to 1888, he was Lord Lieutenant of Cardiganshire, and from 27 May 1865 he was Lieutenant-Colonel Commandant of the county militia regiment, the Royal Cardigan Rifles. On his retirement in 1877 he became Honorary Colonel of its successor unit, the Royal Cardigan Artillery.

== Political career ==
Pryse's father, Pryse Pryse (1777–1849) and brother, Pryse Loveden (1815–55) had both served as MP for Cardigan Boroughs. On his brother's death in 1855, Edward Pryse declined to contest the seat and John Lloyd Davies was elected as a rare Conservative MP for the constituency at the ensuing by-election.

Pryse entered the political fray in 1857 when he emerged as a Liberal opponent to John Lloyd Davies. Although Pryse had little political experience, his connection with the family based at Gogerddan was considered to be a considerable advantage. Shortly after his candidature was announced, Davies had withdrawn from the contest.

Pryse came under scrutiny in 1868 amidst suggestions that he was neglecting his parliamentary duties. His absence from a key debate on the disestablishment of the Irish Church was cited as an example of this.

Matters came to a head on 29 May when a Liberal conference was held at Aberaeron to consider the representation of both the borough constituency and the Cardiganshire county seat. An editorial in the Welshman complained that the meeting was instigated by the Liberation Society and that prominent Liberals, including Pryse were not invited. Consideration was given to inviting the sitting member for the county, Sir Thomas Lloyd, who wanted to avoid the financial burden of a contested election, to contest the borough seat in place of Pryse. A few days later, Pryse announced at a meeting in Aberystwyth that he would retire from Parliament at the next election. On 16 June he issued an address announcing his retirement from the Commons.

=== Later life ===
In later years, Pryse was out of touch with the radicalism of Cardiganshire Liberalism. However he remained president of the Cardiganshire Liberal Association at the time of his death in 1888.

Pryse opposed Gladstone's proposals to disestablish the Irish Church. In 1886, he opposed Gladstone's Home Rule proposals and supported David Davies who stood as a Liberal Unionist candidate for Cardiganshire in 1886. Davies was narrowly defeated and it was a blow to the prestige of the House of Gogerddan that the family had supported a losing candidate. Pryse did, however, invite the winning candidate, Bowen Rowlands, to his home shortly after the election, appointed him a JP for the county and "generally accepted the situation with the best grace possible".

As Lord Lieutenant, Pryse appointed more Liberals as magistrates than generally happened in other counties. At the time of his death the Cambrian News stated that Pryse 'believed it was his right and the right of his class to rule." His death was regarded as the end of an era.

== Sources ==
=== Books and journals ===
- Jones, Ieuan Gwynedd (1964). "Cardiganshire Politics in the Mid-Nineteenth Century" (PDF). Ceredigion. 5 (1): 14–41.

Parliament of the United Kingdom
| Preceded by John Lloyd Davies | Member of Parliament for Cardigan Boroughs; 1857–1868 | Succeeded by Thomas Lloyd |
Honorary titles
| Preceded by Thomas Lloyd | Lord Lieutenant of Cardiganshire; 1857–1888 | Succeeded by Herbert Davies-Evans |
