= Charles Broke Vere =

British Army officer and politician

Major-General Sir Charles Broke Vere KCB KCH MP
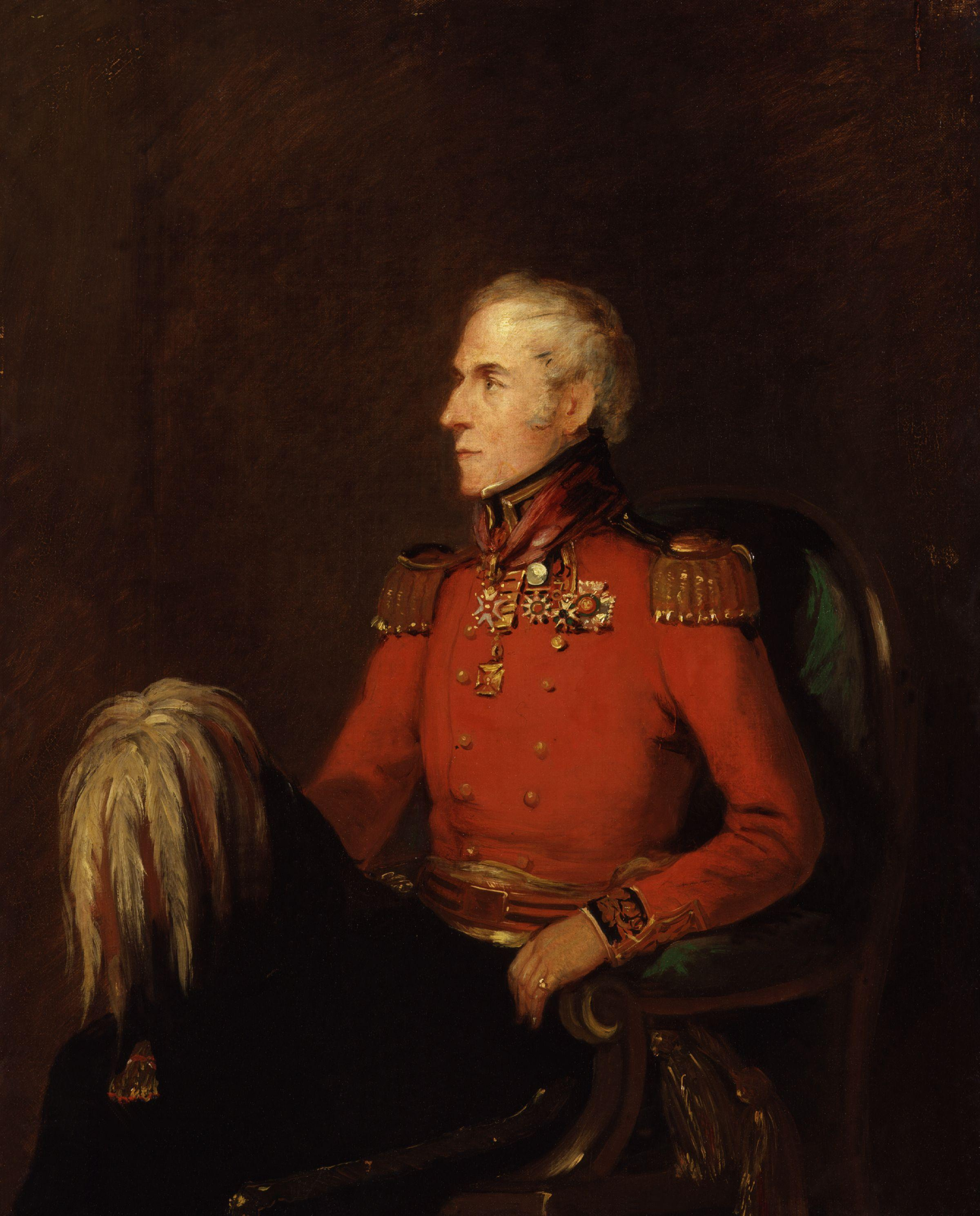
- Portrait by William Salter, 1837–1840
- Born: Charles Broke; 21 February 1779
- Died: 1 April 1843 (aged 64)

Major-General Sir Charles Broke Vere KCB KCH (born Charles Broke; 21 February 1779 – 1 April 1843) was a British Army officer and Conservative politician.

== Life ==
He was the son of Philip Bowes Broke and the younger brother of Rear-Admiral Sir Philip Broke, 1st Baronet. After service during the Battle of Castricum, Broke fought under the Duke of Wellington in the Napoleonic Wars and later rose to the rank of major general. For his gallantry at the Battle of Waterloo in 1815 he was awarded the Russian Order of St. Vladimir and the Dutch Order of Wilhelm. In 1822 he took the surname of Vere in addition to Broke. In 1825, upon Wellington's recommendation, he was appointed aide-de-camp to King William IV, a post he held for twelve years. He also represented East Suffolk in the House of Commons between 1835 and 1843. Broke Vere died in April 1843, at the age of 64.

Parliament of the United Kingdom
Preceded by The Lord Henniker; Robert Newton Shawe	Member of Parliament for East Suffolk; 1835 – 1843; With: The Lord Henniker	Succeeded by The Lord Henniker; The Lord Rendlesham
