= Sir Thomas Gooch, 5th Baronet =

British politician and landowner

Lieutenant-Colonel Sir Thomas Gooch Bt
- Born: 2 November 1767; Suffolk
- Died: 18 December 1851 (aged 84); Benacre Hall, Suffolk
- Education: Christ Church, Oxford
- Spouse: Marianne Whittaker (m. 1796)
- Children: 6
- Military career
- Allegiance: United Kingdom
- Branch: British Army
- Service years: 1791–1802
- Rank: Lieutenant-colonel
- Units: 10th Light Dragoons; 4th Dragoons; 5th Regiment of Foot

Member of Parliament for Suffolk
- In office 1806–1830 Serving with Sir Charles Bunbury (1806–1812) and Sir William Rowley (1812–1830)

Sir Thomas Sherlock Gooch, 5th Baronet (2 November 1767 – 18 December 1851) was a British Tory politician and landowner.

== Early life ==
He was the son of Sir Thomas Gooch, 4th Baronet of Benacre Hall and Anna Maria Hayward. He was educated at Westminster School and Christ Church, Oxford before undertaking the Grand Tour; he returned to England in 1793. Between 1791 and 1802 he served in the British Army, including in the 10th Light Dragoons, 4th Dragoons and 5th Regiment of Foot.

On 11 May 1796, he married Marianne Whittaker, the daughter of Abraham Whittaker. Together they had six children. This marriage made Gooch a relative of Sir John Rous, Bt, and Rous recommended to William Pitt the Younger that Gooch should enter parliament.

== Political career ==
He was elected as the Member of Parliament for Suffolk in 1806 and held the seat until 1830. In the Commons, Gooch was aligned with the Pittites; he voted against the repeal of Additional Forces Acts 1803 and was listed as friendly to the abolition of the slave trade. On 21 May 1810, he voted against the motion for moderate parliamentary reform introduced by the Whig MP, Hon. Thomas Brand. In May 1812, he renewed his opposition to parliamentary reform, stating that reform spelled "total ruin" and that the Commons had never been so representative.

After the 1812 United Kingdom general election, Gooch was recorded on Treasury lists as a supporter of the Tory Liverpool ministry. He opposed the Roman Catholic relief bills proposed in 1813, 1816 and 1817. He also voted in favour of Christian missions to India and against a review of the Corn Laws. In 1815, he came out in favour of agricultural protection, noting that rural unemployment had reached an unprecedented level in Suffolk. The following year, he presented a county petition calling for relief from agricultural distress. Gooch voted in favour of the Habeas Corpus Suspension Act 1817.

In 1826, upon the death of his father, Gooch inherited the baronetcy and estates in Suffolk and Birmingham. At the 1830 United Kingdom general election, he was humiliatingly defeated by the pro-electoral reform Whig candidate, Charles Tyrell. Gooch served as the High Sheriff of Suffolk in 1833.

Parliament of the United Kingdom
Preceded by Sir Charles Bunbury, Bt; Viscount Brome	Member of Parliament for Suffolk; 1806–1830; With: Sir Charles Bunbury, Bt 1806–1812; Sir William Rowley, Bt 1812–1830	Succeeded by Sir Henry Bunbury, Bt; Charles Tyrell
Baronetage of Great Britain
Preceded by Thomas Gooch	Baronet (of Benacre Hall); 1826–1851	Succeeded by Edward Sherlock Gooch
