= 1856 East Suffolk by-election =

UK parliamentary by-election

The 1856 East Suffolk by-election was held on 26 December 1856 after the death of the incumbent Conservative MP Sir Edward Gooch. It was won by the unopposed Conservative MP, John Henniker-Major.
