= 1843 East Suffolk by-election =

Election

The 1843 East Suffolk by-election was held on 18 April 1843 after the death of the incumbent Conservative MP Charles Broke Vere. It was retained by the Conservative candidate Frederick Thellusson. The Whig candidate had already stood in 1841.

East Suffolk by-election, 1843
Party	Candidate	Votes	%	±%
Conservative	Frederick Thellusson	2,984	61.9	−16.4
Whig	Mr Adair	1,833	38.1	+16.4
Majority		1,184	23.8	+7.0
Turnout		4,817	70.3	−1.8
Conservative hold		Swing	-16.4	
