= Robert Newton Shawe =

Robert Newton Shawe (26 October 1784 – 21 October 1855) was a British politician.

The son of William Cunliffe Shawe, Robert lived at Kesgrave Hall in Suffolk. He was chairman of the Quarter Sessions held in Woodbridge. At the 1832 UK general election, he was elected in East Suffolk, representing the Whigs. He supported the Corn Laws and called for the immediate abolition of slavery. He lost his seat at the 1835 UK general election.

Shawe later served as a deputy lieutenant of Suffolk. He was a major donor to the Woodbridge Literary and Mechanics' Institution. He withdrew from public life due to poor health, and died in 1855 in Stapleton, Bristol.

Parliament of the United Kingdom
New constituency	Member of Parliament for East Suffolk; 1832–1835; With: John Henniker-Major	Succeeded by Charles Broke Vere; John Henniker-Major
