= Fitzroy Kelly =

British politician (1796–1880)

The Right Honourable Sir Fitzroy Kelly QC
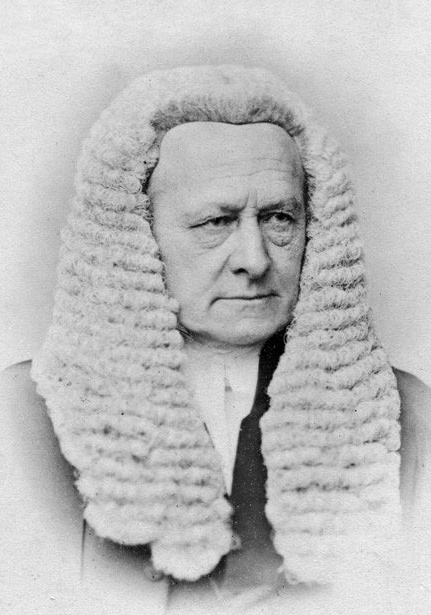

Chief Baron of the Exchequer
- In office 16 July 1866 – 18 September 1880
- Monarch: Victoria
- Preceded by: Sir Frederick Pollock
- Succeeded by: Office abolished

Attorney General for England and Wales
- In office 21 February 1858 – 11 June 1859
- Prime Minister: The Earl of Derby
- Preceded by: Sir Richard Bethell
- Succeeded by: Sir Richard Bethell

Solicitor General for England and Wales
- In office 27 February 1852 – 17 December 1852
- Prime Minister: The Earl of Derby
- Preceded by: Sir William Wood
- Succeeded by: Sir Richard Bethell
- In office 17 July 1845 – 29 June 1846
- Prime Minister: Sir Robert Peel
- Preceded by: Sir Frederic Thesiger
- Succeeded by: John Jervis

Personal details
- Born: 9 October 1796 London, England
- Died: 18 September 1880 (aged 83) Brighton, England
- Party: Tory
- Spouse(s): Agnes Scarth (m. 1821; died 1851) Ada Cunningham (m. 1856)

Sir Fitzroy Edward Kelly (9 October 1796 – 18 September 1880) was an English commercial lawyer, Tory politician and judge. He was the last Chief Baron of the Exchequer.

== Background and education ==
Kelly was born in London, the son of Robert Hawke Kelly (died in or before 1807), a captain in the Royal Navy. His mother was the novelist Isabella Kelly, daughter of Captain William Fordyce, Groom of the Privy Chamber to George III. In 1824, he was called to the bar by Lincoln's Inn, having already gained a reputation as a skilled special pleader.

== Career ==
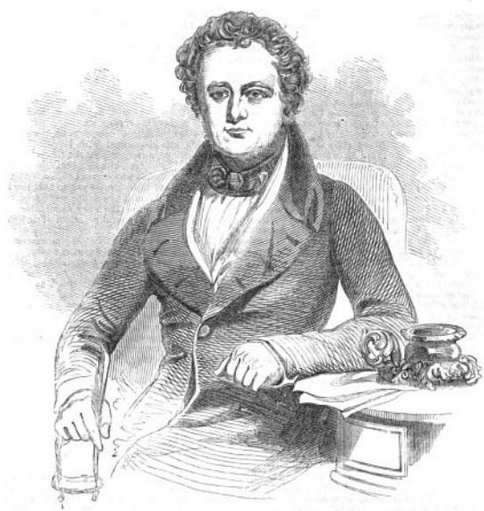
Sir Fitzroy Kelly, 1847

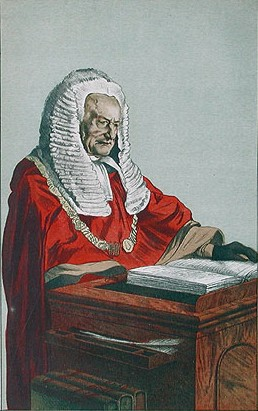
Vanity Fair caricature, November 1871

In 1834 Kelly was made a King's Counsel, remarkably after only ten years' call. A strong Tory, he was returned as Member of Parliament for Ipswich in 1835, but was unseated on petition. In 1837 however he again became member for that town. From 1843 to 1847 he was MP for Cambridge, and in 1852 was elected member for Harwich, but with a vacancy suddenly occurring in East Suffolk, he preferred to contest that seat and was elected.

Most of his legal cases were of a commercial nature, but one was one of the great criminal poisoning crimes of the early Victorian period. In March 1845 Kelly defended John Tawell, the "Quaker murderer," was in fact no longer a member of the Quakers, though he did try to return to that group. Tawell had poisoned his mistress, Sarah Hart, and fled from Salt Hill in Slough by train. However, a description of Tawell was sent to London by electric telegraph, and he was captured. Kelly did the best he could for his client, but he was not accustomed to criminal defence. His argument that Sarah Hart had eaten too many apple pips and been poisoned by the prussic acid in the pips led to the nickname "Apple-pip," which followed Kelly for the rest of his life. Despite his endeavours, his client was found guilty and hanged.

Kelly was Solicitor General in 1845 (when he was knighted) and again from February to December 1852, during which time he was junior to Attorney General Sir Frederic Thesiger in the prosecution of John Henry Newman for libel, the Achilli trial.

In 1854, Kelly was appointed to the Royal Commission for Consolidating the Statute Law, a royal commission to consolidate existing statutes and enactments of English law.

In 1858–1859 he was Attorney General in Lord Derby's second ministry. In 1866 he was raised to the bench as the last Chief Baron of the Exchequer and made a member of the Privy Council, entitling him to sit on the Judicial Committee of the Privy Council.

Kelly died at Brighton on 18 September 1880, aged 83. He was buried on the western side of Highgate Cemetery.

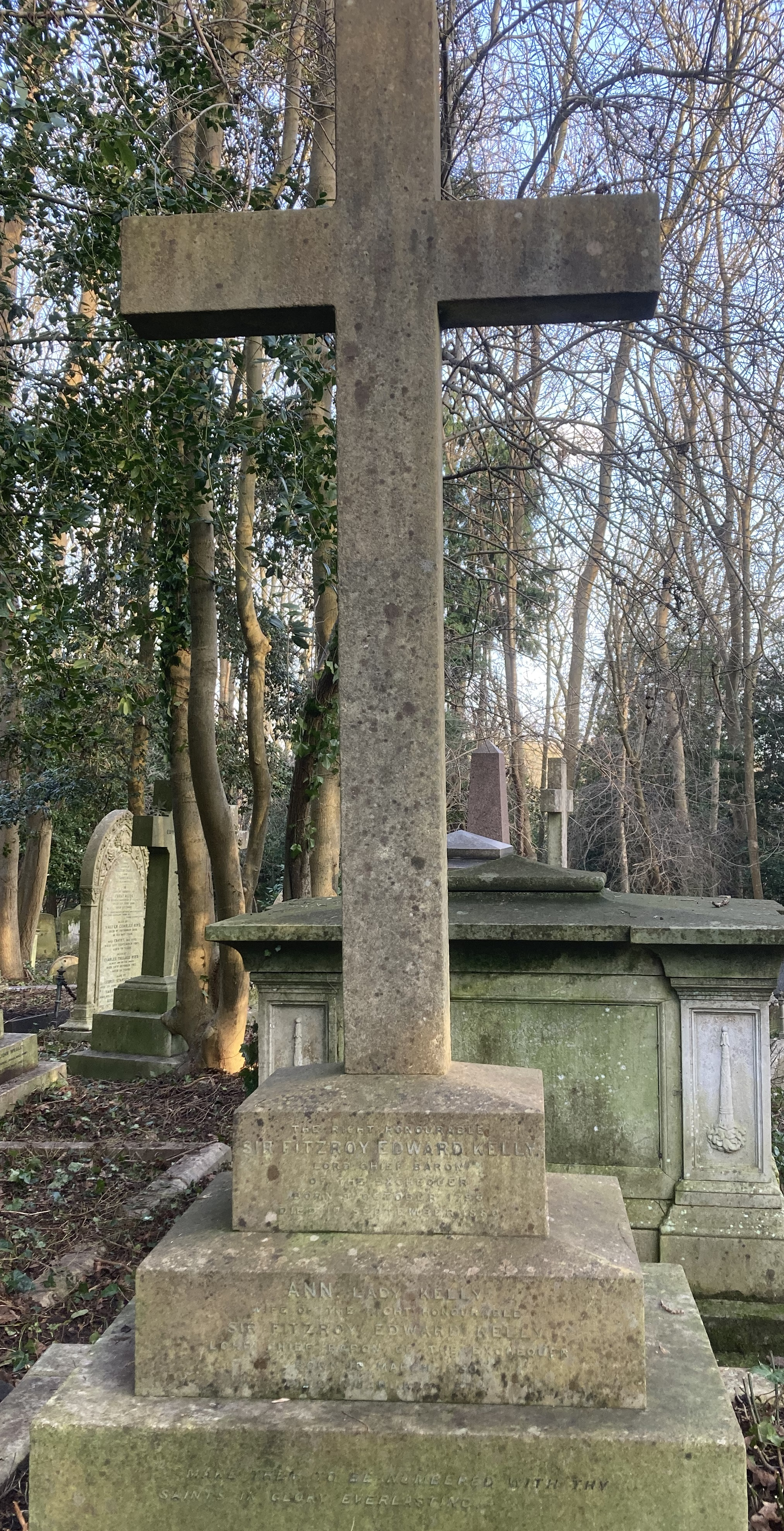
Grave of Sir Fitzroy Edward Kelly in Highgate Cemetery

== Arms ==
Coat of arms of Fitzroy Kelly
Crest A griffin passant. Escutcheon Azure two lions rampant respectant Or supporting on their paws a castle Argent. Motto Turris Fortis Mihi Deus

== See also ==
- Politics of the United Kingdom

== Bibliography ==
- Leigh Rayment's Historical List of MPs
- Foss, E. (2006) [1848–64]. A Biographical Dictionary of the Judges of England: from the Conquest to the present time, 1066–1870. ISBN 1-4286-2959-9.
- Gowing, Richard (1875) 'Sir Fitzroy Kelly, Lord Chief Baron' in: Richard Gowing Public Men of Ipswich and East Suffolk. a series of personal sketches. Ipswich: Scopes; London: Grant & Co., 1875; pp. 71–78

Parliament of the United Kingdom
Preceded by James Morrison; Rigby Wason	Member of Parliament for Ipswich; 1835; With: Robert Adam Dundas	Succeeded by James Morrison; Rigby Wason
Preceded by Thomas Milner Gibson; Henry Tufnell	Member of Parliament for Ipswich; 1838–1841; With: Thomas Milner Gibson 1838–1839; Thomas John Cochrane 1839–1841	Succeeded by George Rennie; Rigby Wason
Preceded by Alexander Grant; John Manners-Sutton	Member of Parliament for Cambridge; 1843–1847; With: John Manners-Sutton	Succeeded by Robert Adair; William Campbell
Preceded by Robert Wigram Crawford; John Bagshaw	Member of Parliament for Harwich; 1852; With: John Bagshaw	Succeeded by Isaac Butt; John Bagshaw
Preceded by The Lord Rendlesham and Sir Edward Gooch, Bt	Member of Parliament for East Suffolk; 1852–1866; With: Sir Edward Gooch, Bt 1852; John Henniker-Major, 1852–1866	Succeeded by John Henniker-Major; Sir Edward Kerrison, Bt
Legal offices
Preceded by Sir Frederic Thesiger	Solicitor General for England and Wales; 1845–1846	Succeeded by Sir John Jervis
Preceded by Sir William Wood	Solicitor General for England and Wales; 1852	Succeeded by Sir Richard Bethell
Preceded by Sir Richard Bethell	Attorney General for England and Wales; 1858–1859	Succeeded by Sir Richard Bethell
Preceded by Sir Frederick Pollock	Chief Baron of the Exchequer; 1866–1880	Office abolished
