= Frederick Thellusson, 5th Baron Rendlesham =

British politician

The Right Honourable The Lord Rendlesham JP DL
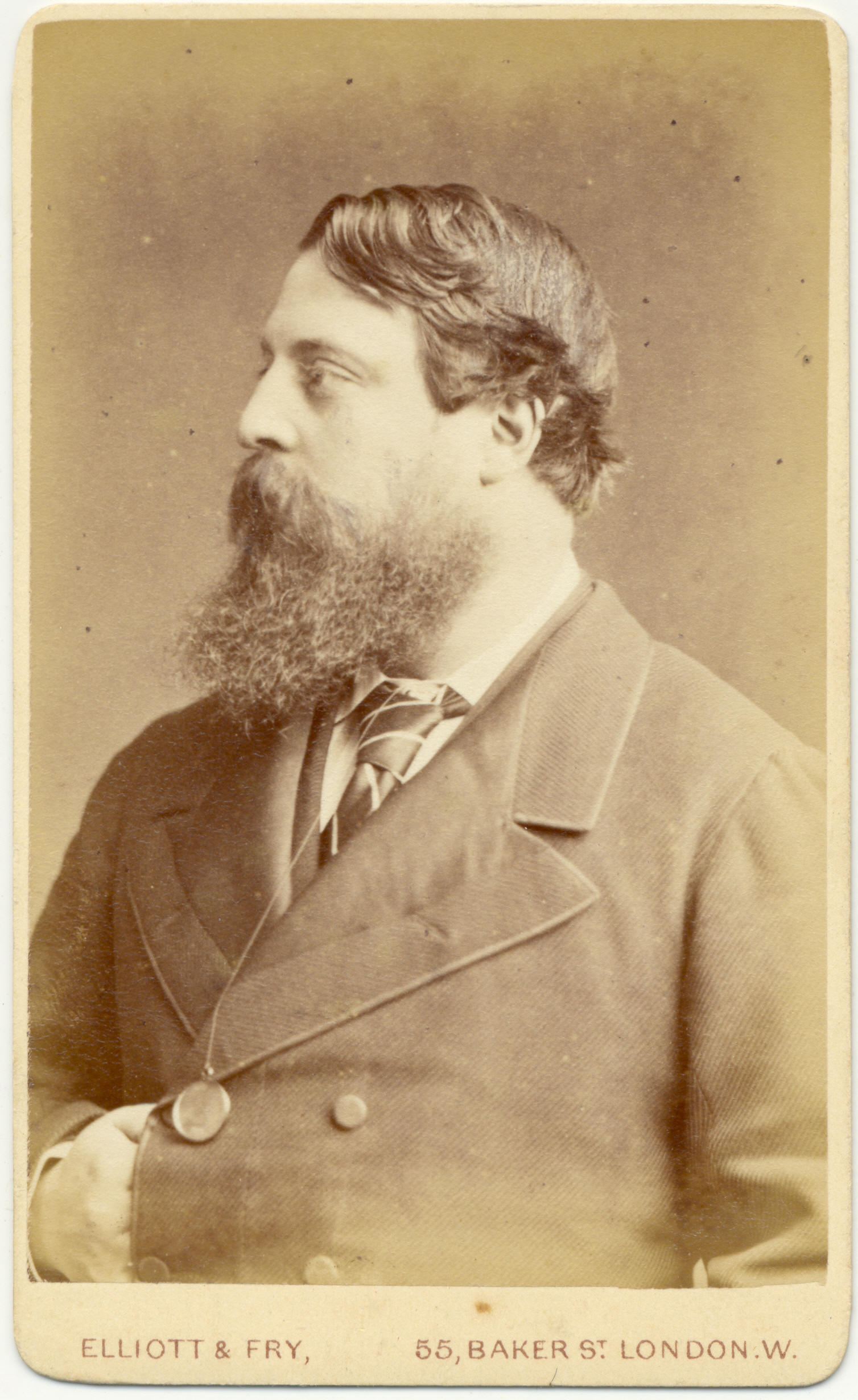
- Photograph of Lord Rendlesham, c. 1874

Member of Parliament for Suffolk Eastern
- In office 1874–1885 Serving with Viscount Mahon, Frederick St John Barne
- Preceded by: Frederick Snowdon Corrance; Viscount Mahon
- Succeeded by: Constituency abolished

Personal details
- Born: Frederick William Brook Thellusson; 9 February 1840 Florence, Italy
- Died: 9 November 1911 (aged 71) Rendlesham Hall
- Spouse: Lady Egidia Montgomerie (after 1861)
- Parent(s): Frederick Thellusson, 4th Baron Rendlesham; Elizabeth Prescott Duff
- Education: Eton College
- Alma mater: Christ Church, Oxford

Frederick William Brook Thellusson, 5th Baron Rendlesham JP DL (9 February 1840 – 9 November 1911), was a British Conservative politician.

== Early life ==
Frederick Thellusson was born in Florence, Italy on 9 February 1840. He was the only son of Frederick Thellusson, 4th Baron Rendlesham, and his wife Elizabeth Charlotte (née Prescott) Duff, a daughter of Sir George Prescott, 2nd Baronet, and former wife of General Sir James Duff. His mother died when he was less than one year old.

His great-grandfather, the British merchant and banker Peter Thellusson, was perhaps best known for his "extraordinary will" which "gave rise to an act of Parliament known as the Thellusson act."

Thellusson was educated in England at Eton and Christ Church, Oxford. In 1852, aged twelve, he succeeded in the barony on the death of his father. However, as this was an Irish peerage it did not entitle him to a seat in the House of Lords.

== Career ==
Lord Rendlesham was appointed Sheriff of Suffolk in 1870 and elected to the House of Commons as member of parliament (MP) for Suffolk East at a by-election in March 1874, a seat he held until the constituency was abolished at the 1885 general election.

Reportedly a fine footballer at Eton and Oxford, he maintained a keen interest in other sports in later life, being on the National Hunt Committee as well as a member of the Jockey Club and the Royal Yacht Squadron.

On 12 February 1887 he was appointed Honorary Colonel of the Suffolk Artillery Militia, and retained the position until the unit was disbanded in 1909.

Failing eyesight in 1911 caused him to resign from long-held positions as chairman of the East Suffolk County Council and the Suffolk Quarter Sessions. He subsequently contracted blood-poisoning, leading to the amputation of his left hand in July 1911.

== Personal life ==
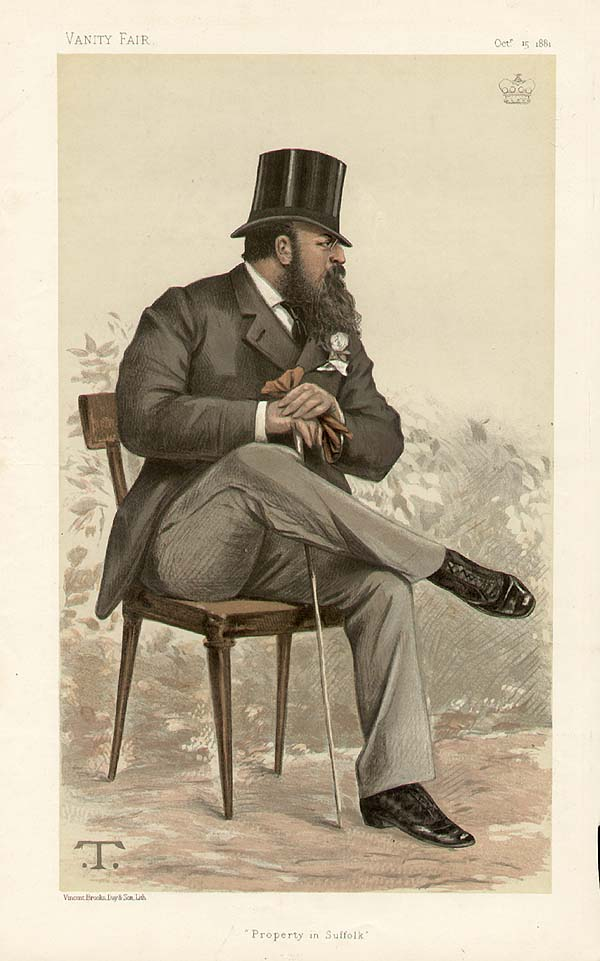
"Property in Suffolk" Baron Rendlesham, M.P., as caricatured by Théobald Chartran in Vanity Fair, October 1881

In 1861, Lord Rendlesham was married to Lady Egidia Montgomerie (c. 1843–1880) at St Peter's Church, Eaton Square followed by a honeymoon at Peckforton Castle, the seat of John Tollemache. She was a daughter of Archibald Montgomerie, 13th Earl of Eglinton and the former Theresa Howe (née Newcomen) Cockerell (widow of Capt. Richard Howe Cockerell) who was an illegitimate daughter of Thomas Gleadowe-Newcomen, 2nd Viscount Newcomen. They had three sons and five daughters, including:

- Hon. Miriam Isabel Thellusson (d. 1950), who married Godfrey Herbert Joseph Williams, eldest son of Morgan Stuart Williams, in 1901. They divorced in 1923.
- Hon. Cecilia Blanche Thellusson (d. 1948), who died unmarried.
- Frederick Archibald Charles Thellusson, 6th Baron Rendlesham (1868–1938), who married Lilian Manley, fourth daughter of Joshua Manley. After her death in 1931, he married Dolores Olga Williams (widow of Henry Harcourt Williams), a daughter of Sir William Salusbury-Trelawny, 10th Baronet), later the same year.
- Hon. Ruby Alexandrina Elizabeth Thellusson (1870–1955), who married Lt.-Col. Bernard James Petre, eldest son of James Duff MP, in 1907.
- Hon. Adeline Egidia Thellusson (c. 1871–1948), who married Maj. Lewis Kerrison Jarvis, son of Sir Lewis Jarvis, of Middleton Towers, in 1891.
- Hon. Mariota Thellusson (1873–1924), who married Arthur Egerton, 5th Earl of Wilton, son of Seymour Egerton, 4th Earl of Wilton, in 1895.
- Percy Edward Thellusson, 7th Baron Rendlesham (1874–1943), who married Gladys Dunlop Yorke, the former wife of Hon. Alfred Yorke and only child of Andrew Vans Dunlop Best, in 1922.
- Hon. Hugh Edmund Thellusson (1876–1926), who married Gwynnydd Colleton, younger daughter of Brig.-Gen. Sir Robert Colleton, 9th Baronet, in 1914.

Lady Rendlesham died in January 1880. Lord Rendlesham remained a widower until his death at Rendlesham Hall, near Woodbridge, Suffolk, in November 1911, aged 71. He was succeeded in the barony by his eldest son Frederick.

== Notes ==
Parliament of the United Kingdom
Preceded by Frederick Snowdon Corrance; Viscount Mahon	Member of Parliament for Suffolk Eastern; 1874–1885; With: Viscount Mahon 1874–1875; Frederick St John Barne 1876–1885	Constituency abolished
Peerage of Ireland
Preceded by Frederick Thellusson	Baron Rendlesham; 1852–1911	Succeeded by Frederick Thellusson
