= Sir Edward Gooch, 6th Baronet =

British Conservative politician

Sir Edward Gooch Bt

Member of Parliament for East Suffolk
- In office 19 February 1846 – 9 November 1856 Serving with Fitzroy Kelly (1852–1856); Frederick Thellusson (1846–1852)
- Preceded by: John Henniker-Major; Frederick Thellusson
- Succeeded by: Fitzroy Kelly; John Henniker-Major

Personal details
- Born: 6 June 1802
- Died: 9 November 1856 (aged 54)
- Party: Conservative

Sir Edward Sherlock Gooch, 6th Baronet of Benacre Hall (6 June 1802 – 9 November 1856) was a British Conservative politician.

== Life ==
Born in 1802, Gooch was the son of Sir Thomas Gooch, 5th Baronet and Marianne née Whittaker. He first married Louisa Anna Maria Prescott, daughter of Sir George Beeston Prescott, 2nd Baronet, in 1828, and they had at least two children: Florence Jane Charlotte Giva Gooch (died 1918) and Louisa Catherine Gooch (died 1848).

After Louisa's death in 1837, in 1839 he married Harriet Hope-Vere, daughter of James Joseph Hope-Vere and his wife, Lady Elizabeth Hay. They had nine children: Elizabeth Gooch; Diana Anne Gooch (died 1928); Harriet Sophia Gooch (died 1927); Charlotte Matilda Gooch; Isabel Edith Gooch (died 1931); Edward Sherlock Gooch (1843–1872); Francis Robert Sherlock Lambert Gooch (1850–1881); Alfred Sherlock Gooch (1851–1899); and another unknown son, born between 1844 and 1849.

Gooch was elected MP for East Suffolk at a by-election in 1846—caused by the resignation of John Henniker-Major—and held the seat until his death in 1856.

He succeeded to the Baronetcy of Benacre Hall upon the death of his father, Sir Thomas Gooch, 5th Baronet. Upon his own death in 1856, his son Sir Edward Sherlock Gooch, 7th Baronet succeeded to the peerage.

== Arms ==
Coat of arms of Sir Edward Gooch, 6th Baronet
Crest A talbot statant per pale Argent and Sable. Escutcheon Per pale Argent and Sable a chevron between three talbots statant all counterchanged, on a chief Gules three leopards’ faces Or. Motto Fide Et Virtute

Parliament of the United Kingdom
Preceded by John Henniker-Major; Frederick Thellusson	Member of Parliament for East Suffolk; 1846–1856; With: Fitzroy Kelly (1852–1856); Frederick Thellusson (1846–1852)	Succeeded by Fitzroy Kelly; John Henniker-Major
Baronetage of Great Britain
Preceded by Thomas Gooch	Baronet (of Benacre Hall); 1851–1856	Succeeded by Edward Sherlock Gooch
