= Pryse Loveden =

British politician

Pryse Loveden MP
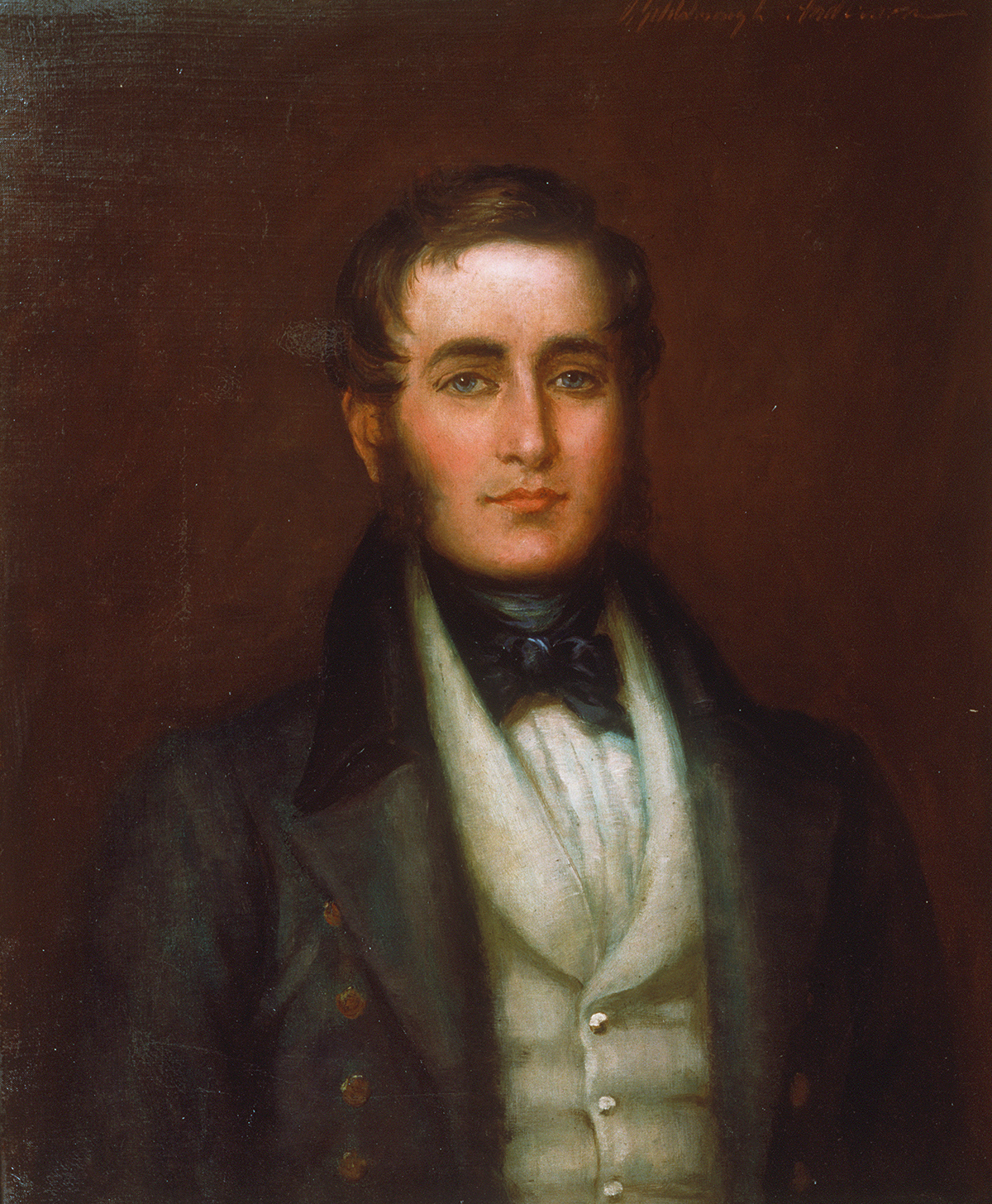
- Pryse Loveden - copy by Charles Goldsborough Anderson of an earlier painting

Member of Parliament for Cardigan Boroughs
- In office 1849–1855
- Preceded by: Pryse Pryse
- Succeeded by: John Lloyd Davies

Personal details
- Born: 1815
- Died: 1855 (aged 39–40) Gogerddan, Cardiganshire, Wales
- Party: Liberal
- Parent(s): Pryse Pryse; Jane Cavallier
- Education: Eton College

Pryse Pryse (1815–1855), also known as Pryse Loveden, was a British Liberal politician. He served as MP for Cardigan Boroughs from 1849 until his death in 1855.

Pryse's father, Pryse Pryse (1774–1849) had served as MP for Cardigan Boroughs for over thirty years. He died at an early age of 40 in 1855.

Parliament of the United Kingdom
Preceded by Pryse Pryse	Member of Parliament for Cardigan Boroughs; 1849 – 1855	Succeeded by John Lloyd Davies
