= Frederick St John Barne =

British army officer and Conservative politician

Frederick St John Newdigate Barne (5 September 1842 – 25 January 1898) was a British army officer and a Conservative politician who sat in the House of Commons from 1876 to 1885.

Barne was the eldest son of Frederick Barne of Sotterley HalI, near Wangford, Suffolk and his wife Mary Anne Elizabeth Honywood, eldest daughter of Sir John Courtenay Honywood, 5th Baronet and Mary Anne Cooper. His father had been M.P. for the rotten borough of Dunwich in succession to earlier members of the Barne family. He joined the Scots Fusilier Guards in 1859 and retired as captain and lieutenant-colonel in 1872.

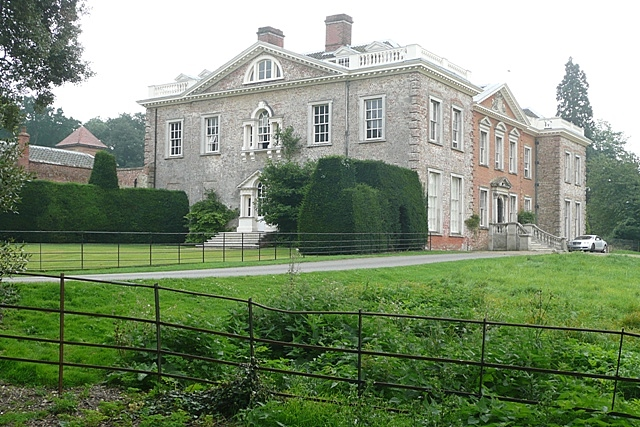
Sotterley Hall

Barne was elected at a by-election in 1876 as one of the two Members of Parliament (MP) for East Suffolk, and held the seat until the 1885 general election, when constituency was divided under the Redistribution of Seats Act 1885.

Barne married Lady Constance Adelaide Seymour, daughter of Francis Seymour, 5th Marquess of Hertford and Lady Emily Murray in 1871. They lived at Sotterley Hall. Their son Michael Barne was the last surviving officer of the 1901-04 Discovery Expedition.

Parliament of the United Kingdom
Preceded by Viscount Mahon; Lord Rendlesham	Member of Parliament for East Suffolk; 1876–1885; With: Lord Rendlesham	Constituency divided See Eye; Lowestoft; Stowmarket; Sudbury; Woodbridge
