= John Henniker-Major, 3rd Baron Henniker =

British peer and barrister

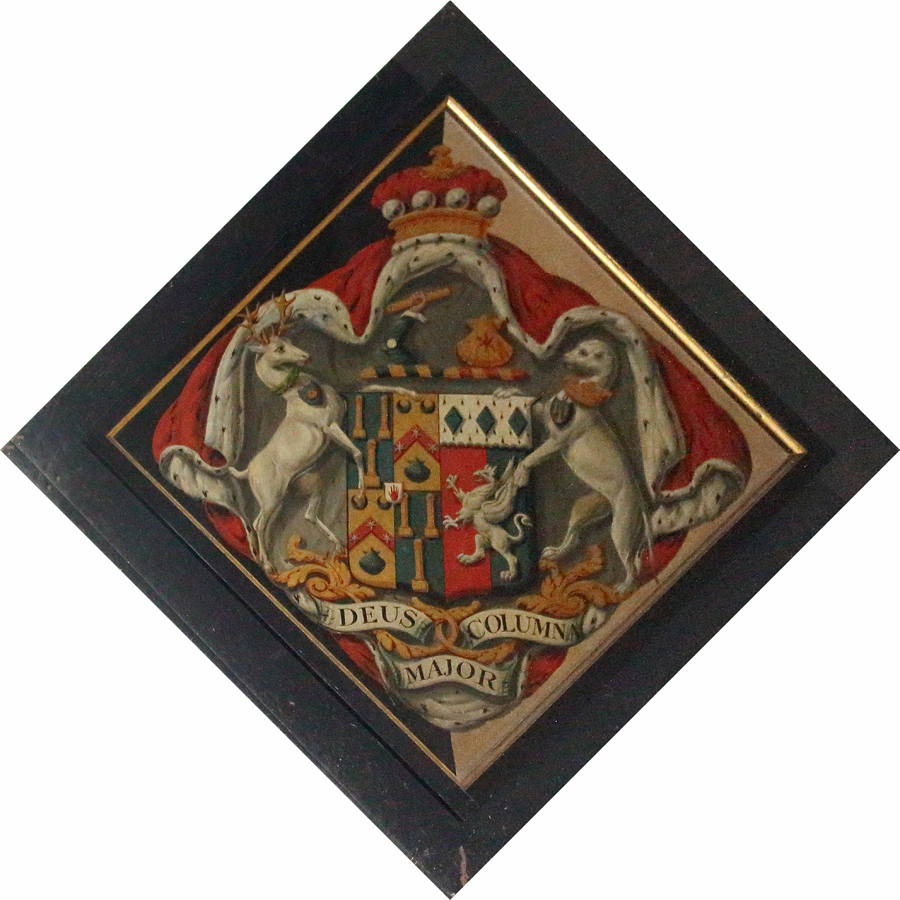
Funerary hatchment of John Henniker-Major, 3rd Baron Henniker in Church of St Mary Magdalene, Thornham Magna

John Minet Henniker-Major, 3rd Baron Henniker, born John Minet Henniker, (20 November 1777 – 22 July 1832) was a British peer and barrister.

== Biography ==
John Minet Henniker was a practising barrister. He graduated from the University of Cambridge with a Doctor of Law (LL.D.) and held the office of Bencher of Lincoln's Inn.

John Minet Henniker was a nephew of John Henniker-Major, 2nd Baron Henniker, whom he succeeded as third Baron Henniker in December 1821. In May 1822 John Minet Henniker legally changed his name to John Minet Henniker-Major by royal license.

... Henniker married, Jan. 1, 1799, Mary, daughter of the Rev. William Chafy, Canon of Canterbury, and Rector of Swalecliffe and Sturrey in Kent, by whom he had five daughters and three sons ...

Their children were:

- Hon. Anne Eliza Henniker-Major (d. 19 Apr 1872)
- Hon. Mary Henniker-Major (d. 12 Sep 1870). She married John Longueville Bedingfield. They had no known issue.
- Hon. Emily Henniker-Major (d. 23 Mar 1882). She married Thomas Lovett. They had one son, and four daughters.
- Hon. Elizabeth Henniker-Major (d. 23 May 1882). She married Rev. Sir Augustus Brydges Henniker, 3rd Baronet, son of Sir Brydges Henniker, 1st Baronet. They had two sons, and a daughter.
- Hon. Frances Henniker-Major (d. 22 Dec 1881)
- John Henniker-Major, 4th Baron Henniker of Stratford-upon-Slaney (3 Feb 1801 - 16 Apr 1870)
- Hon. Major Henniker-Major (21 Jul 1810 - 8 May 1842)
- Rev. Hon. William Chafie Henniker-Major (13 Mar 1813 - 28 Aug 1845)

Upon Lord Henniker's death in 1832, the title was inherited by his eldest son John.

Peerage of Ireland
Preceded by John Henniker-Major	Baron Henniker; 1821–1832	Succeeded by John Henniker-Major
