= East Suffolk (constituency) =

Parliamentary constituency in the United Kingdom, 1832–1885

- Former county constituency for the House of Commons
- Context of 1832-1868. Extract from 1837 result: the easternmost 'doubly' blue land.
- County: Suffolk

1832–1885
- Seats: Two
- Created from: Aldeburgh, Dunwich, Orford and Suffolk
- Replaced by: Eye, Lowestoft and Woodbridge

East Suffolk was a county constituency in Suffolk, England. It elected two Members of Parliament to the House of Commons of the Parliament of the United Kingdom by the bloc vote system of election.

== History ==
The seat was created under the Reform Act 1832 as one of two divisions, together with the Western Division, of the Parliamentary County of Suffolk. This resulted in a more representative allocation, with a total of four MPs instead of two for the former entire county at large, which still allowed for double voting (or more) of those Forty Shilling Freeholders who also were householders or landlords of any particular boroughs within the county. This Act retained the four largest boroughs of the seven before 1832, with the three abolished boroughs of Aldeburgh, Dunwich and Orford being absorbed into the Eastern Division.

Further sweeping changes took place as a result of the Redistribution of Seats Act 1885 which saw the 2 two-member Suffolk divisions being replaced by five single-member constituencies. The Eastern Division was largely replaced by the Northern or Lowestoft Division, the North-Eastern or Eye Division and the South-Eastern or Woodbridge Division.

== Boundaries ==
1832–1885: The part of the county of Suffolk not included in the West Suffolk constituency, i.e. the Hundreds of Blything, Bosmere and Claydon, Carlford, Colneis, Hoxne, Loes, Mutford and Lothingland, Plomesgate, Samford, Thredling, Wangford, and Wilford, and the Liberty of Ipswich.

== Members of Parliament ==
Election	1st Member	1st Party	2nd Member	2nd Party
1832	John Henniker-Major	Tory	Robert Newton Shawe	Whig
1834	John Henniker-Major	Conservative	Robert Newton Shawe	Whig
1835	John Henniker-Major	Conservative	Charles Broke Vere	Conservative
1843 by-election	John Henniker-Major	Conservative	The Lord Rendlesham	Conservative
1846 by-election	Sir Edward Gooch, Bt	Conservative	The Lord Rendlesham	Conservative
1852 by-election	Sir Edward Gooch, Bt	Conservative	Fitzroy Kelly	Conservative
1856 by-election	John Henniker-Major	Conservative	Fitzroy Kelly	Conservative
1866 by-election	Hon. John Henniker-Major	Conservative	Sir Edward Kerrison, Bt	Conservative
1867 by-election	Hon. John Henniker-Major	Conservative	Frederick Snowdon Corrance	Conservative
1870 by-election	Arthur Stanhope	Conservative	Frederick Snowdon Corrance	Conservative
1874	Arthur Stanhope	Conservative	Frederick Thellusson	Conservative
1876 by-election	Frederick St John Barne	Conservative	Frederick Thellusson	Conservative
1885	constituency abolished: see Eye, Lowestoft, Stowmarket, Sudbury and Woodbridge			

== Election results ==
=== Elections in the 1830s ===
General election 1832: East Suffolk
Party	Candidate	Votes	%
Tory	John Henniker-Major, Sr.	2,030	35.0
Whig	Robert Newton Shawe	1,990	34.3
Tory	Charles Broke Vere	1,784	30.7
Turnout		3,826	89.7
Registered electors		4,265	
Majority		40	0.7
Tory win (new seat)			
Majority		206	3.6
Whig win (new seat)			

General election 1835: East Suffolk
Party	Candidate	Votes	%	±%
Conservative	John Henniker-Major, Sr.	2,452	36.0	+1.0
Conservative	Charles Broke Vere	2,321	34.1	+3.4
Whig	Robert Newton Shawe	2,029	29.8	−4.5
Majority		292	4.3	N/A
Turnout		4,345	86.3	−3.4
Registered electors		5,034		
Conservative hold		Swing	+1.6	
Conservative gain from Whig		Swing	+2.8	

General election 1837: East Suffolk
Party	Candidate	Votes	%
Conservative	John Henniker-Major, Sr.	Unopposed	
Conservative	Charles Broke Vere	Unopposed	
Registered electors		6,278	
Conservative hold			
Conservative hold			

=== Elections in the 1840s ===
General election 1841: East Suffolk
Party	Candidate	Votes	%	±%
Conservative	John Henniker-Major, Sr.	3,279	39.8	N/A
Conservative	Charles Broke Vere	3,178	38.5	N/A
Whig	Robert Adair	1,787	21.7	New
Majority		1,391	16.8	N/A
Turnout		4,983	72.1	N/A
Registered electors		6,915		
Conservative hold		Swing	N/A	
Conservative hold		Swing	N/A	

Vere's death caused a by-election.

By-election, 18 April 1843: East Suffolk
Party	Candidate	Votes	%	±%
Conservative	Frederick Thellusson	2,952	61.9	−16.4
Whig	Robert Adair	1,818	38.1	+16.4
Majority		1,134	23.8	+7.0
Turnout		4,770	70.3	−1.8
Registered electors		6,786		
Conservative hold		Swing	−16.4	

Henniker-Major resigned by accepting the office of Steward of the Manor of Northstead, causing a by-election.

By-election, 19 February 1846: East Suffolk
Party	Candidate	Votes	%	±%
Conservative	Edward Gooch	Unopposed		
Conservative hold				

General election 1847: East Suffolk
Party	Candidate	Votes	%	±%
Conservative	Edward Gooch	Unopposed		
Conservative	Frederick Thellusson	Unopposed		
Registered electors		6,673		
Conservative hold				
Conservative hold				

=== Elections in the 1850s ===
Thellusson's death caused a by-election.

By-election, 1 May 1852: East Suffolk
Party	Candidate	Votes	%	±%
Conservative	Fitzroy Kelly	Unopposed		
Conservative hold				

General election 1852: East Suffolk
Party	Candidate	Votes	%	±%
Conservative	Edward Gooch	Unopposed		
Conservative	Fitzroy Kelly	Unopposed		
Registered electors		6,343		
Conservative hold				
Conservative hold				

Gooch's death caused a by-election.

By-election, 26 December 1856: East Suffolk
Party	Candidate	Votes	%	±%
Conservative	John Henniker-Major, Sr.	Unopposed		
Conservative hold				

General election 1857: East Suffolk
Party	Candidate	Votes	%	±%
Conservative	John Henniker-Major, Sr.	Unopposed		
Conservative	Fitzroy Kelly	Unopposed		
Registered electors		5,907		
Conservative hold				
Conservative hold				

Kelly was appointed Attorney General for England and Wales, causing a by-election.

By-election, 6 March 1858: East Suffolk
Party	Candidate	Votes	%	±%
Conservative	Fitzroy Kelly	Unopposed		
Conservative hold				

General election 1859: East Suffolk
Party	Candidate	Votes	%	±%
Conservative	John Henniker-Major, Sr.	2,677	37.8	N/A
Conservative	Fitzroy Kelly	2,517	35.6	N/A
Liberal	Robert Adair	1,883	26.6	New
Majority		634	9.0	N/A
Turnout		4,480 (est)	76.8 (est)	N/A
Registered electors		5,837		
Conservative hold				
Conservative hold				

=== Elections in the 1860s ===
General election 1865: East Suffolk
Party	Candidate	Votes	%	±%
Conservative	John Henniker-Major (senior)	Unopposed		
Conservative	Fitzroy Kelly	Unopposed		
Registered electors		6,769		
Conservative hold				
Conservative hold				

Henniker-Major was elevated to a UK peerage, becoming Lord Hartismere, and Kelly resigned after being appointed Chief Justice of the Court of the Exchequer, causing a by-election for both seats.

By-election, 25 July 1866: East Suffolk
Party	Candidate	Votes	%	±%
Conservative	John Henniker-Major (junior)	Unopposed		
Conservative	Edward Kerrison	Unopposed		
Conservative hold				
Conservative hold				

Kerrison resigned, causing a by-election.

By-election, 20 February 1867: East Suffolk
Party	Candidate	Votes	%	±%
Conservative	Frederick Snowdon Corrance	2,489	54.0	N/A
Liberal	Robert Adair	2,120	46.0	New
Majority		369	8.0	N/A
Turnout		4,609	68.1	N/A
Registered electors		6,769		
Conservative hold				

General election 1868: East Suffolk
Party	Candidate	Votes	%	±%
Conservative	John Henniker-Major (junior)	3,650	26.8	N/A
Conservative	Frederick Snowdon Corrance	3,620	26.5	N/A
Liberal	Robert Adair	3,321	24.4	N/A
Liberal	Thomas Western	3,045	22.3	N/A
Majority		299	2.1	N/A
Turnout		6,818 (est)	75.6 (est)	N/A
Registered electors		9,024		
Conservative hold				
Conservative hold				

=== Elections in the 1870s ===
Henniker-Major succeeded to the peerage, becoming Lord Hartismere.

By-election, 1 Jun 1870: East Suffolk
Party	Candidate	Votes	%	±%
Conservative	Arthur Stanhope	3,456	51.3	−2.0
Liberal	Robert Adair	3,285	48.7	+2.0
Majority		171	2.6	+0.5
Turnout		6,741	74.7	−0.9
Registered electors		9,024		
Conservative hold		Swing	−2.0	

General election 1874: East Suffolk
Party	Candidate	Votes	%	±%
Conservative	Frederick Thellusson	4,136	37.4	+10.6
Conservative	Arthur Stanhope	3,896	35.3	+8.8
Liberal	George Tomline	3,014	27.3	−19.4
Majority		882	8.0	+5.9
Turnout		7,030 (est)	74.1 (est)	−1.5
Registered electors		9,484		
Conservative hold		Swing	+10.2	
Conservative hold		Swing	+9.3	

Stanhope was appointed a Lord Commissioner of the Treasury, requiring a by-election.

By-election, 20 Mar 1874: East Suffolk
Party	Candidate	Votes	%	±%
Conservative	Arthur Stanhope	Unopposed		
Conservative hold				

Stanhope succeeded to the peerage, becoming Earl Stanhope and causing a by-election.

By-election, 24 Feb 1876: East Suffolk
Party	Candidate	Votes	%	±%
Conservative	Frederick St John Barne	3,659	57.5	−15.2
Liberal	Charles Easton	2,708	42.5	+15.2
Majority		951	15.0	+7.0
Turnout		6,367	66.6	−7.5
Registered electors		9,558		
Conservative hold		Swing	−15.2	

=== Elections in the 1880s ===
General election 1880: East Suffolk
Party	Candidate	Votes	%	±%
Conservative	Frederick Thellusson	4,239	37.3	−0.1
Conservative	Frederick St John Barne	3,618	31.8	−3.5
Liberal	Robert Lacey Everett	3,504	30.8	+3.5
Majority		114	1.0	−7.0
Turnout		7,433 (est)	77.1 (est)	+3.0
Registered electors		9,635		
Conservative hold		Swing	−0.9	
Conservative hold		Swing	−2.6	
