= 1852 East Suffolk by-election =

UK parliamentary by-election

The 1852 East Suffolk by-election was held on 1 May 1852 after the death of the incumbent Conservative MP Frederick Thellusson, Lord Rendlesham. It was retained by the Conservative candidate Fitzroy Kelly, the Solicitor General for England and Wales and previously MP for Harwich, who was elected unopposed.
