= Pryse Pryse =

British Whig politician

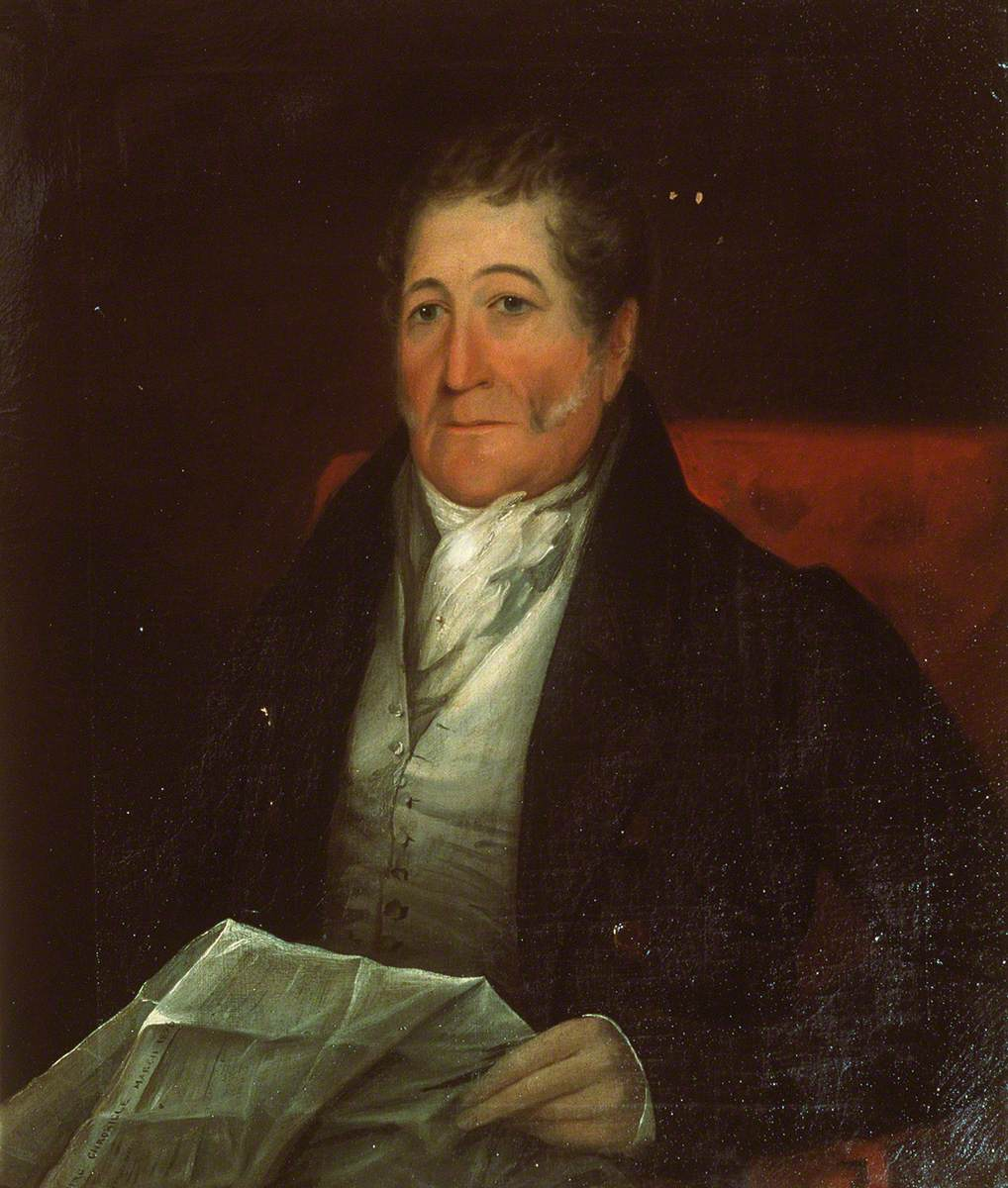
Pryse Loveden Pryse (1774–1849)

Pryse Loveden Pryse (1 June 1774 – 4 January 1849) of Gogerddan, Cardiganshire and Buscot Park, Berkshire was a British Lord Lieutenant and Member of Parliament for Cardigan Boroughs from 1818 until his death in 1849.

== Early life and career ==
He was born Pryse Loveden, and was the son of Edward Loveden Loveden of Buscot Park, who was also a Member of Parliament, and Margaret Pryse, daughter of Lewis Pryse of Woodstock and Gogerddan. Through his mother, he inherited an estate of 30,000 acres in upland Cardiganshire. Possession of Gogerddan, which dominated the borough of Aberystwyth, gave him a strong claim to a parliamentary seat. Upon inheriting the estate he adopted the name Pryse Loveden Pryse, and was usually referred to in later life as Pryse Pryse.

In 1794 Pryse was commissioned as an ensign into the Berkshire Militia (of which his father was the lieutenant-colonel) and served as High Sheriff of Cardiganshire in 1799.

== Parliamentary career 1818-32 ==
The Gogerddan interest had for generations played a prominent part in the politics of Cardiganshire, and the borough of Aberystwyth was regarded as being controlled by Gogerddan, in contrast to the county town of Cardigan which fell under the influence of the Lisburne family.

As early as 1796 there was speculation that Pryse would seek election to the Commons but his father wrote in 1801 that he did not appear interested. By 1812, he became involved in the contest for Cardigan Boroughs, and proposed Herbert Evans as candidate against the sitting member, John Vaughan of Crosswood. Roland Thorne suggests that had Pryse, as heir to the Gogerddan interest, wished to stand himself, Evans would have withdrawn in his favour. Evans was defeated by a narrow margin and Pryse was now regarded as a future candidate himself. Soon after, his first wife died in tragic circumstances (see below) and Pryse withdrew temporarily from public life.

By 1816, however, he was a prospective candidate for the Cardiganshire county seat following the death of Thomas Johnes of Hafod. A county meeting was held at Cardigan and a vote taken between the two candidates, Pryse and William Edward Powell of Nanteos. The vote went in Powell's favour. In order to 'preserve the peace of the county', Pryse then withdrew on the understanding that Powell would support his candidature when a vacancy arose in Cardigan Boroughs. This was regarded as a political as well as a personal compromise, since Powell was a Tory and Pryse a Whig.

In 1818, Pryse was returned unopposed for the boroughs seat.

His father, Edward Loveden, died on 6 January 1822, and Pryse inherited a life interest in his Berkshire estates. These, however, continued to cause financial difficulties.

During his thirty-year parliamentary career, Pryse was regarded as a supporter of moderate reform who advocated Liberal principles.

Pryse was a supporter of parliamentary reform. On 22 March 1831, supported the First Reform Bill and voted against Isaac Gascoyne's wrecking amendment. This brought down the government and resulted in a General Election in which Pryse was returned unopposed.

== Later parliamentary career 1832-49 ==
In 1835 it was rumoured that efforts were being made to replace Pryse as member for the boroughs with John Jones of Ystrad, former member for Carmarthen Boroughs.

== The 1841 election ==
In 1841, Pryse faced a challenge for his seat, although the initial suggestion of Lieut-Col. Copland of London was not considered a serious threat. The emergence of John Harford, who owned considerable property in Lampeter was a different matter. Harford had inherited the Peterwell estate in 1821, and although he never actually resided in Cardiganshire, he invested heavily in the improvement of the estate and the provision of water supply for the town of Lampeter. He also donated the land where St David's College, Lampeter, was established.

The campaign in Aberystwyth was reported to be strongly in favour of Pryse, where the "overwhelming feeling [was] the injustice of turning out a long tried representative to make room for a thorough stranger". In Cardigan too, Pryse was greeted by crowds of supporters and his colours were flown from the masts of ships in the harbour.

Harford, however, was a formidable opponent and proceeded to poll heavily in the southern boroughs. However, the election terminated in an "extraordinary and anamalous manner" after the poll books from Aberystwyth went missing. Harford had a majority of 69 in Cardigan and 16 at Lampeter. In turn, Pryse had a majority of 20 at the small borough of Adpar and was also reported to be 83 votes ahead at Aberystwyth. Overall, this gave him a majority of 20 votes. However, the poll books for Aberystwyth were found to be missing. It was the responsibility of the Mayor of Aberystwyth to deliver the poll books to the count at Cardigan and controversy arose from the fact that the Mayor, R.O. Powell, was not only a supporter of Harford but also the brother of Colonel Powell, the Conservative member for Cardiganshire who had recently been returned unopposed. In the absence of the poll books, the election could nor be called and neither candidate took a seat in the Commons.

There were accusations of coercion and Pryse subsequently voted in favour of the ballot in the Commons. Despite this close contest in 1841, Pryse held the seat until his death.

== Family ==
Shortly after inheriting the Gogerddan estates, he married Harriet Flower on 20 July 1798. She was the daughter of William Flower, 2nd Baron Ashbrook (1744–80) and the widow of John Ellis Agar. His wife died on 14 January 1813 following a fire at Gogerddan. Subsequently, Pryse married Jane Cavallier, daughter of Peter Cavallier of Guisborough, Yorkshire on 29 April 1815. They had three sons, the eldest of whom, Pryse Pryse, succeeded his father as MP for Cardigan Boroughs.

== Sources ==
- Colyer, R.J. (December 1981). "The Gentry and the County in nineteenth century Cardiganshire". Welsh History Review. 10 (4): 497–535.
- Colyer, Richard (1978). "The Pryse family of Gogerddan, and the decline of a great estate, 1800-1960" (PDF). Welsh History Review. 9 (1): 407–31.
- Emma Elizabeth Thoyts, History of the Royal Berkshire Militia (Now 3rd Battalion Royal Berks Regiment), Sulhamstead, Berks, 1897/Scholar Select, ISBN 978-1-37645405-5.

Parliament of the United Kingdom
Preceded by John Vaughan	Member of Parliament for Cardigan Boroughs; 1818 – 1849	Succeeded by Pryse Loveden
