= John Lloyd Davies =

Welsh lawyer and politician

John Lloyd Davies (1 November 1801 – 21 March 1860) was a Welsh lawyer and politician, originally from the Aberystwyth area, who represented Cardigan boroughs in Parliament between 1855 and 1857.

He was born "in humble curcumstances", to which he alluded when seeking election as MP for Cardigan Boroughs in 1855. His parents were Thomas and Elizabeth Davies. He began his career as a solicitor, and is known by the age of 24 to have been working for a practice in Newcastle Emlyn. In 1825 he married Anne, a daughter of John Lloyd of Allt-yr-odyn, and thus inherited her family estate. One of Anne's ancestors had been a David Lloyd ("David ap Llewellin Lloid") who was MP for Cardiganshire in the sixteenth century. John Lloyd Davies himself was descended from another of the Lloyd family of Castell-Howel to which his wife belonged.

Davies was a chief opposer of the Rebecca rioters in the Llandysul district.

Following his first wife's death, he was re-married in 1857 to Elizabeth Bluett, the only child of Thomas Bluett Hardwicke of Tytherington Grange, Gloucestershire, supposedly a descendant of Bess of Hardwick. He served as a J.P. and D.L. for the Cardiganshire and Carmarthenshire districts, and in 1845 was appointed High Sheriff of Cardiganshire. Between 1855 and 1857 he was the elected Conservative M.P. for the Cardiganshire boroughs. In 1857 he was opposed by Captain Edward Pryse of Gogerddan who, although with little political experience was expected to receive support because of his family connections. Within a week Davies had withdrawn from the contest.

Later in 1857 a vacancy arose for the representation of Carmarthenshire following the death of D.A. Saunders Davies. Lloyd Davies immediately issued an address, within days of the former member's death. His candidacy was fiercely opposed, most notably in radical journals such as the Amserau. He withdrew when it became apparent that David Pugh had considerable support in the county.

Davies was a campaigner for the construction of the railway from Carmarthen to Llandysul. Although he had some sympathy for the rioters' cause, he attempted to deter them from violence, and death threats were made against him as a result.

He died at Blaendyffryn on 21 March 1860. His son, Arthur Lloyd Davies, assumed the surname "Lloyd" in accordance with the will of Davies Lloyd, the brother of John Lloyd Davies's first wife, Anne. Arthur died in 1852, and John Lloyd Davies's heir was Arthur's son, John Davies-Lloyd (born 1850).

== Sources ==
- Rees, Lowri Ann (2011). "Paternalism and Rural Protest: The Rebecca Riots and the Landed Interest of South-West Wales". The Agricultural History Review. 59 (1). British Agricultural History Society: 36–60.
