= Frederick Thellusson, 4th Baron Rendlesham =

British Conservative Party politician

The Right Honourable The Lord Rendlesham DL
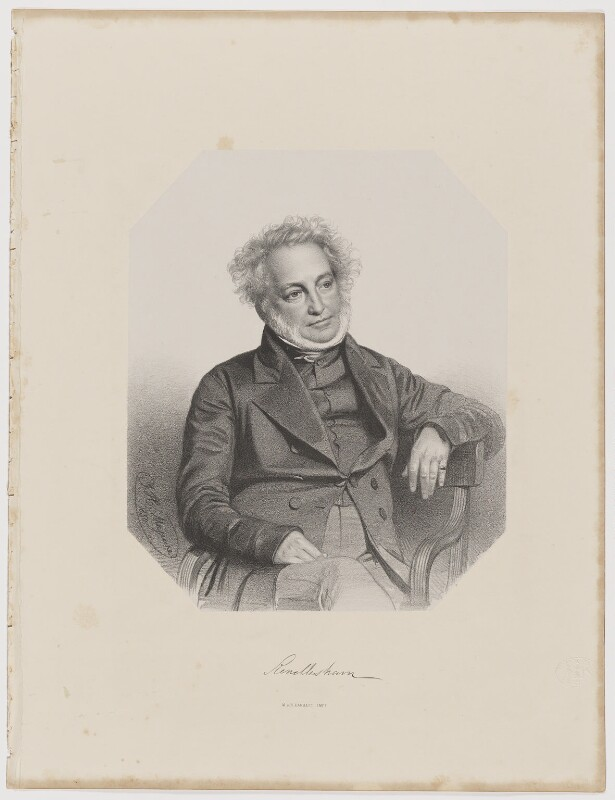

Member of Parliament for Suffolk East
- In office 1843–1852 Serving with The Lord Henniker, Sir Edward Gooch, Bt
- Preceded by: The Lord Henniker; Sir Charles Broke Vere
- Succeeded by: Sir Edward Gooch, Bt; The Lord Henniker

Personal details
- Born: Frederick Thellusson; 6 January 1798
- Died: 6 April 1852 (aged 54)
- Party: Conservative
- Spouse(s): Elizabeth, Lady Duff (m. 1838; died 1840)
- Relations: Peter Thellusson (grandfather)
- Children: Hon. Anne Blanche Thellusson; Frederick Thellusson, 5th Baron Rendlesham
- Parent(s): Peter Thellusson, 1st Baron Rendlesham; Elizabeth Eleanor Cornwall

Frederick Thellusson, 4th Baron Rendlesham DL (6 January 1798 – 6 April 1852), was a British Conservative Party politician.

== Early life ==
Rendlesham was born into an English family of Huguenot descent on 6 January 1798. He was the third son and fourth child of Peter Thellusson, 1st Baron Rendlesham, and Elizabeth Eleanor Cornwall (a daughter of John Cornwall, a Russia merchant of Hendon, Middlesex). Among his siblings were John Thellusson, 2nd Baron Rendlesham (who died without male issue), Hon. George Thellusson (a Lieutenant in the 11th Dragoons who was killed in action at the Battle of Vitoria), Hon. Caroline Thellusson (wife of Charles Crabb Boulton. William Thellusson, 3rd Baron Rendlesham (the Vicar at Aldenham who died without male issue), Hon. Edmund Thellusson (1799–1818), who drowned in 1818. and Hon. Arthur Thellusson.

His paternal grandfather was Peter Thellusson, a wealthy London merchant who was a son of Issac de Thellusson, the Genevan ambassador at Paris to the Court of Louis XV. Among his paternal family were uncles George Woodford Thellusson, MP for Southwark, Tregony, and Barnstaple, and Charles Thellusson, MP for Evesham.

== Career ==
Rendlesham succeeded his elder twin brother in the barony in 1839. As this was an Irish peerage it did not entitle him to an automatic seat in the House of Lords. He was instead elected to the House of Commons as Member of Parliament (MP) for Suffolk East at a by-election in 1843, a seat he held until his death nine years later.

== Personal life ==
On 5 June 1838, Thellusson married Elizabeth Eleanor, Lady Duff (née Prescott), widow of General Sir James Duff. Elizabeth was a daughter of Sir George Prescott, 2nd Baronet and Catherine Crichton Mills (a daughter of Sir Thomas Mills, Governor of Quebec). Together, they had one son and one daughter:

- Hon. Anne Blanche Thellusson (1839–1886), who died unmarried.
- Frederick William Brook Thellusson, 5th Baron Rendlesham (1840–1911), who married Lady Egidia Montgomerie, a daughter of Archibald Montgomerie, 13th Earl of Eglinton.

Lady Rendlesham died in December 1840. Lord Rendlesham survived her by twelve years and died in April 1852, aged 54. He was succeeded in the barony by his only son, Frederick.

Parliament of the United Kingdom
Preceded by The Lord Henniker; Sir Charles Broke Vere	Member of Parliament for Suffolk East; 1843–1852; With: The Lord Henniker 1843–1846; Sir Edward Gooch, Bt 1846–1852	Succeeded by Sir Edward Gooch, Bt; The Lord Henniker
Peerage of Ireland
Preceded by William Thellusson	Baron Rendlesham; 1839–1852	Succeeded by Frederick William Brook Thellusson
