= John Henniker-Major, 4th Baron Henniker =

British politician (1801–1870)

John Henniker-Major, 4th Baron Henniker (3 February 1801 – 16 April 1870), also 1st Baron Hartismere in the Peerage of the United Kingdom, was a British peer and Member of Parliament.

== Biography ==
Henniker was the son of John Minnet Henniker Major, 3rd Baron Henniker. He was educated at Eton College and St John's College, Cambridge. He succeeded his father as fourth Baron Henniker in July 1832 but as this was an Irish peerage it did not entitle him to a seat in the House of Lords. In December of the same year he was instead elected to the House of Commons for the newly created constituency of East Suffolk, which he represented until 1846 and again from 1856 to 1866. The latter year he was created Baron Hartismere, of Hartismere in the County of Suffolk, in the Peerage of the United Kingdom. This title gave him and his descendants an automatic seat in the House of Lords. He was appointed High Sheriff of Suffolk in 1849.

=== Marriage and issue ===
Lord Henniker married Anna, daughter of Lieutenant-General Sir Edward Kerrison, 1st Baronet, in 1836. Their children were:

- Hon. Mary Henniker-Major (12 Aug 1838 – 20 Jul 1902). Died unmarried.
- John Major Henniker-Major, 5th Baron Henniker of Stratford-upon-Slaney (7 Nov 1842 – 27 Jun 1902)
- Hon. Anne Helen Henniker-Major (4 Dec 1844 – 1907). Died unmarried.
- Hon. Edward Minet Henniker-Major (3 Feb 1848 – 20 Dec 1924). He married a French captain's daughter, Eveline Talavera de St. Maur. No known issue.
- Maj.-Gen. Hon. Arthur Henry Henniker-Major (3 Apr 1855 – 6 Feb 1912). He married the Hon. Florence Ellen Hungerford Milnes, daughter of Richard Monckton Milnes, 1st Baron Houghton. They had no issue.

He died at 6 Grafton Street, Mayfair, on 16 April 1870, aged 69, and was succeeded in his titles by his son John. Lady Henniker died in 1889.

== Notes ==
Parliament of the United Kingdom
| New constituency | Member of Parliament for East Suffolk; 1832–1846; With: Robert Newton Shawe 1832–1835; Sir Charles Broke Vere 1835–1843; The Lord Rendlesham 1843–1846 | Succeeded by The Lord Rendlesham; Sir Edward Sherlock Gooch |
| Preceded by Sir Edward Sherlock Gooch; Sir Fitzroy Kelly | Member of Parliament for East Suffolk; 1856–1866; With: Sir Fitzroy Kelly | Succeeded by John Henniker-Major; Sir Edward Clarence Kerrison |
Honorary titles
| Preceded by The Lord Huntingfield | High Sheriff of Suffolk; 1849 | Succeeded by Thomas James Ireland |
| Preceded by James Hamilton Lloyd Anstruther | High Sheriff of Suffolk; 1853 | Succeeded by Windsor Parker |
Peerage of the United Kingdom
| New creation | Baron Hartismere; 1866–1870 | Succeeded by John Henniker-Major |
Peerage of Ireland
| Preceded by John Minet Henniker-Major | Baron Henniker; 1832–1870 | Succeeded by John Henniker-Major |
