= Margaret Joachim =

Reverend Doctor Margaret Jane Joachim MBE (born 25 June 1949) is a British former Liberal Party and current Liberal Democrat politician who was chair of the Women's Liberal Democrats.

== Background ==
Joachim was the daughter of Reginald and Joyce Margaret Carpenter. She was educated at Brighton and Hove High School, St Hugh's College, Oxford (MA Geology) and the University of Birmingham (PhD Geology). In 1970 she married Paul Joseph Joachim. They had one daughter.

== Political career ==
Joachim was Liberal candidate for the West Gloucestershire at the 1979 General Election, finishing third. She was Liberal candidate for the Finchley (the seat of the then Conservative Prime Minister Margaret Thatcher) at the 1983 General Election, finishing third. She was Liberal candidate for Epsom and Ewell at the 1987 General Election, finishing second. She did not stand for parliament again.

She was training officer for the Liberal Parliamentary Association from 1979 to 1984. She was a member of the executive of the Women's Liberal Federation from 1984 to 1985. She was chair of the Women's Liberal Democrats from 1989 to 1990 and vice-chair from 1990 to 1992. She was chair of the Liberal Democrats London Region Candidates’ Committee from 2007 to 2010 and chair of the Liberal Democrats English Candidates’ Committee from 2011 to 2013.

Joachim was appointed Member of the Order of the British Empire (MBE) in the 2023 New Year Honours for services to women in politics.

== Arms ==
Paul Joachim died before 3 May 2019. Margaret matriculated arms on his behalf.

Coat of arms of Margaret Joachim
Crest Upon a Helm with a Wreath Argent and Vert A Closed Book fesswise Vert edged and garnished Or thereon a British Blue cat statant proper crouched on the back thereof a Mouse Or Mantled Vert doubled Argent. Escutcheon Quarterly Vert and Gules a Cross pommy throughout Argent charged at the end of each limb and at the centre with a Roundel Sable. Motto Ingenuity Badge A Bar pommy Argent fimbriated Sable surmounted at the centre by an Ammonite Vert and charged at each end with a Roundel Sable.

== Electoral record ==
1979 United Kingdom general election: Gloucestershire West
Party	Candidate	Votes	%	±%
Conservative	Paul Marland	28,183	47.9	
Labour	John Watkinson	24,009	40.8	
Liberal	Margaret Joachim	6,370	10.8	
National Front	G Storkey	270	0.5	
Majority		4,174	7.1	
Turnout			83.9	

General Election 1983: Finchley
Party	Candidate	Votes	%	±%
Conservative	Margaret Thatcher	19,616	51.1	−1.4
Labour	Lawrence Gregory Spigel	10,302	26.8	−5.9
Liberal	Margaret Joachim	7,763	20.2	+7.0
Ecology	Simone Joan Wilkinson	279	0.7	N/A
Monster Raving Loony	Screaming Lord Sutch	235	0.6	N/A
Ban Every Licensing Law Society	Antony Joseph Noonan	75	0.2	N/A
Rail Not Motorway	Mary Helen Anscomb	42	0.1	N/A
Law and Order in Gotham City	Antony Peter Whitehead	37	0.1	N/A
Anti-Censorship	David Alec Webb	28	0.1	N/A
Party of Associates with Licensees	Brian Clifford Wareham	27	0.1	N/A
Belgrano Blood-Hunger	Benjamin Cunningham Wedmore	13	0.0	N/A
Majority		9,314	24.2	+4.4
Turnout		38,417	69.0	−2.8
Conservative hold		Swing	+2.2	

General Election 1987: Epsom and Ewell
Party	Candidate	Votes	%	±%
Conservative	Archie Hamilton	33,145	62.21	
Liberal	Margaret Joachim	12,384	23.24	
Labour	Barbara Follett	7,751	14.55	
Majority		20,761	38.97	
Turnout			75.38	
Conservative hold		Swing		
