= James Fraser (publisher) =

- Born: 1804
- Died: 1841 (aged 36–37)
- Occupation: Publisher
- Known for: Founder of Fraser's Magazine

James Fraser (1804–1841) was a Scottish publisher, now known particularly for his association with Thomas Carlyle.

== Life ==
Fraser's background was an Inverness family, and he carried on business at 215 Regent Street, London. Fraser published many books, among them Thomas Carlyle's Hero Worship. The story of the dealings between the author and "the infatuated Fraser, with his dog's-meat tart of a magazine", was told in J. A. Froude's biography of Carlyle.

Fraser had one illegitimate son with a woman named Mary West. James Fitzjames Fraser West was born in 1833. He received medical tuition and practiced as a surgeon at Queen's Hospital, Birmingham.

On 3 August 1836 Grantley Berkeley assaulted Fraser, after the publication of criticism of his novel Berkeley Castle. Cross actions were tried on 3 December, on the part of Fraser for assault, and Berkeley for libel. The damages for the assault were £100, for the libel £2.

Fraser died 2 October 1841 at Argyll Street, London, after a lingering illness.

== Fraser's Magazine ==
Fraser published Fraser's Magazine from February 1830, so-called in fact after the barrister Hugh Fraser who had founded it with William Maginn; Fraser himself referred to it as "The Town and Country".

Among the contributors to the magazine were Thomas Carlyle, William Makepeace Thackeray, James Hogg, Francis Sylvester Mahony, Thomas Love Peacock, J. A. Froude, William Allingham, and other well-known writers. After Fraser's death it fell to his successor, G. W. Nickisson, whose name first appeared on it in 1842. Five years later it was transferred to John William Parker, and it continued under the same name to October 1882, when it was superseded by Longman's Magazine.

The Gallery of Illustrious Literary Characters came out in Fraser's Magazine between 1830 and 1838, comprising 81 portraits, mainly by Daniel Maclise, with text by Maginn. In 1833 a quarto volume containing 34 of the portraits was issued, and in 1874 the complete gallery was republished for the first time. The portraits were reduced in size and the literary matter increased in The Maclise Portrait Gallery, by William Bates, with 85 portraits, London, 1883.

== Notes ==
Attribution

This article incorporates text from a publication now in the public domain: Stephen, Leslie; Lee, Sidney, eds. (1891). "Fraser, James (d.1841)". Dictionary of National Biography. Vol. 26. London: Smith, Elder & Co.
