= Brigade Squad =

Brigade Squad was a course for potential officers run by the Guards Division training depot at Caterham and subsequently Pirbright.

Alan Clark described Brigade Squad as follows:

Brutalisation can take two forms, both of which I have undergone. One is the Etonian education where there is the intellectual kind: it's not so much a brutalisation as a very cruel and long-drawn-out initiation ceremony to a fraternity. And then there is the much rougher brutalisation which takes place at the Guards Brigade Squad Camp, which every guards officer has to undergo. Quite rightly it is worse than that to which the ranks are subjected. So when you see all those 'chinless wonders' strutting about in their posh uniforms, you will know that for eight weeks they have had an absolutely appalling time, probably worse than you will get anywhere outside a Victorian prison.

== People who have completed Brigade Squad ==
In theory any officer serving in the Household Division should have completed Brigade Squad. However, there were a number of methods of avoiding it, e.g. by changing to a Guards Regiment after starting Sandhurst.-

- Robert Lawrence MC, Scots Guards officer injured during the Battle for Tumbledown and the subject of the film of that name; he describes his experience of Brigade Squad in the late 1970s in his book about Tumbledown.
- Michael Heseltine, Secretary of State for Defence.
- Alan Clark, Minister for Defence Procurement. (see above)
- Harry Wynne-Williams, journalist.
- Billy Vincent.
- Michael Alison, Conservative politician.
- Todd Sharpville, blues musician (Brigade Squad 56, Guards Depot, Pirbright 1989).
- Richard Dinnick, writer.
