= Nigel Kingscote =

British soldier, Liberal politician, courtier and agriculturalist (1830–1908)

Sir Nigel Kingscote GCVO KCB JP
- Sir Nigel Kingscote

Commissioner of Woods and Forests
- In office 1885–1895 Serving with George Culley (1885–1893); Stafford Howard (1893–1895)

Member of Parliament for Gloucestershire West
- In office 1852-1885 Serving with Robert Blagden Hale (1852–1857); Sir John Rolt (1857–1867); Edward Arthur Somerset (1867–1868); Samuel Marling (1867–1874); Hon. Randal Plunkett (1874–1880); Lord Moreton (1880–1885)

Personal details
- Born: 28 February 1830
- Died: 22 September 1908 (aged 78)
- Party: Liberal
- Spouse(s): Caroline Wyndham (m. 1851; died 1852) Emily Curzon (m. 1856)
- Children: 4
- Relatives: Thomas Kingscote (brother); Henry Wilson (grandson); Henry Somerset (grandfather); Lord Raglan (great-uncle)
- Military career
- Branch: Army
- Rank: Colonel
- Unit: Scots Fusilier Guards
- Commands: Royal North Gloucestershire Militia
- Conflicts: Crimean War

Colonel Sir Robert Nigel Fitzhardinge Kingscote GCVO KCB JP (28 February 1830 – 22 September 1908) was a British soldier, Liberal politician, courtier and agriculturalist. He was generally known as Sir Nigel Kingscote.

== Biography ==
Kingscote was the son of Colonel Thomas Henry Kingscote, of Kingscote Park, Gloucestershire, by his first wife, Lady Isabella Anne Frances Somerset, a daughter of Henry Somerset, 6th Duke of Beaufort. His mother died when he was less than one year old, shortly after the birth of her second child, a daughter. His brother, Thomas Kingscote, also joined the Royal Household.

== Military career ==
Kingscote was commissioned in to the Scots Fusilier Guards in 1846. He was Aide-de-Camp to his great-uncle, Lord Raglan, during the Crimean War, and later achieved the rank of lieutenant-colonel in the Royal Scots Fusiliers. He was appointed Honorary Colonel of the Royal North Gloucestershire Militia (later 4th (Militia) Battalion, Gloucestershire Regiment) on 28 January 1862 and retained the position until the unit's disbandment in 1908.

== Political career ==
Kingscote was Member of Parliament for Gloucestershire West between 1852 and 1885. He was appointed Deputy Lord Lieutenant of Gloucestershire in 1856. The latter year he was appointed a Commissioner of Woods and Forests, a post he held until 1895. He was also a justice of the peace for Gloucestershire and Wiltshire and a Trustee of the manor of Horsley.

== Court positions ==
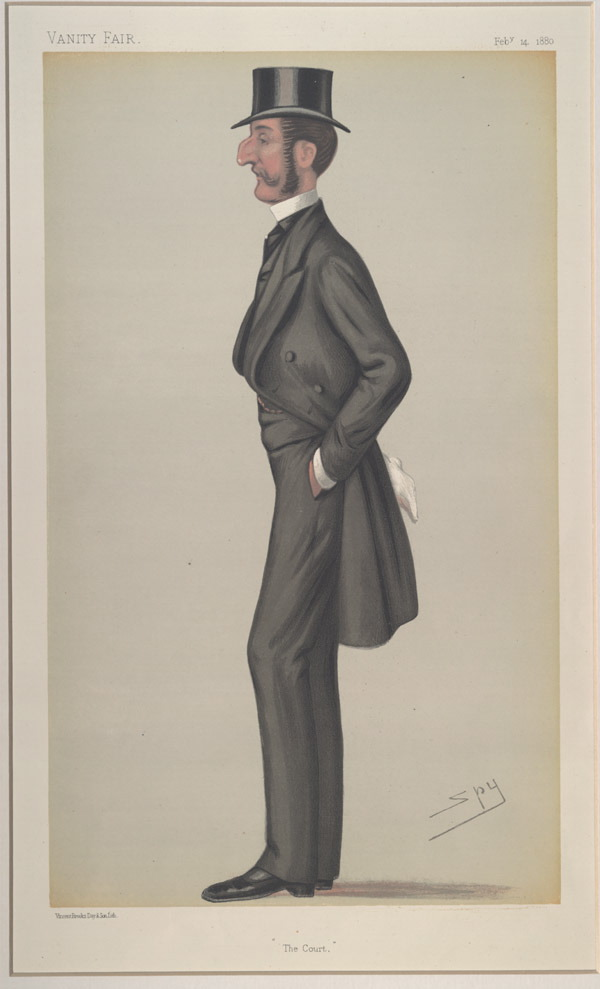
Caricature by Spy published in Vanity Fair, 1880.

Kingscote was a Groom-in-Waiting to Queen Victoria between 1859 and 1866, when he resigned, and as an Extra Equerry to the Prince of Wales in 1867. He served as Superintendent of the Prince of Wales's stables until 1885, was appointed to the Council of the Prince of Wales in 1886, and as Receiver-General of the Duchy of Cornwall in 1888, Extra Equerry to Edward VII between 1901 and 1902 and Paymaster-General of the Royal Household between 1901 and 1908.

He was appointed a Companion of the Order of the Bath in 1855, and a Knight Commander of the Order of the Bath in 1889. After the accession of King Edward VII, he was appointed a Knight Grand Cross of the Royal Victorian Order (GCVO) in the 1902 Birthday Honours, and was invested with the insignia by the King at Buckingham Palace on 18 December 1902.

== Agriculture ==
Kingscote was also involved in agricultural affairs and served as President of the Royal Agricultural Society in 1878.

== Family ==
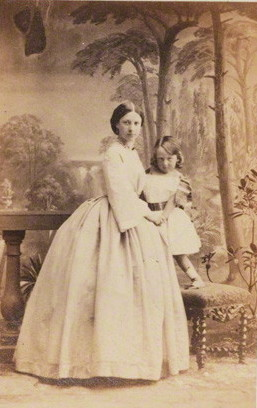
Lady Emily Marie Kingscote (née Curzon); Nigel Richard Fitzhardinge Kingscote, 1860, by Camille Silvy

Kingscote was twice married.

He married firstly the Hon Caroline Sophia Wyndham, daughter of George Wyndham, 1st Baron Leconfield, in 1851. She died in childbirth on 19 March 1852 at Drove, Westhampnett in West Sussex: her newborn son died on the same day.

Kingscote married secondly Lady Emily Marie Curzon, daughter of Richard Curzon-Howe, 1st Earl Howe, in 1856. Lady Emily was a fellow courtier, serving as Lady of the Bedchamber to Queen Alexandra. They had two sons and two daughters:

- Nigel Richard Fitzhardinge Kingscote (14 February 1857 - 24 November 1921)
- Harriet Maude Isabella Kingscote (March 1860 - 14 March 1906), married Arthur Wilson and was the mother of Field Marshal Henry Maitland Wilson, 1st Baron Wilson.
- Winifred Ida Kingscote (24 April 1862 - 25 October 1938), married George Cholmondeley, 4th Marquess of Cholmondeley on 16 July 1879 and was the mother of George Cholmondeley, 5th Marquess of Cholmondeley.
- Albert Edward Leicester Fitzhardinge Kingscote (13 May 1865 - ?)

== Death ==
Kingscote died in September 1908, aged 78. Lady Kingscote died in December 1910.

Parliament of the United Kingdom
Preceded by Hon. Grantley Berkeley; Robert Blagden Hale	Member of Parliament for Gloucestershire West; 1852–1885; With: Robert Blagden Hale 1852–1857; Sir John Rolt 1857–1867; Edward Arthur Somerset 1867–1868; Samuel Marling 1867–1874; Hon. Randal Plunkett 1874–1880; Lord Moreton 1880–1885	Succeeded by Lord Moreton; Benjamin St John Ackers
Government offices
Preceded by Hon. Charles Alexander Gore; George Culley	Commissioner of Woods and Forests; 1885–1895; With: George Culley 1885–1893; Stafford Howard 1893–1895	Succeeded by John Francis Fortescue Horner; Stafford Howard
