= Grantley Berkeley =

British politician (1800–1881)

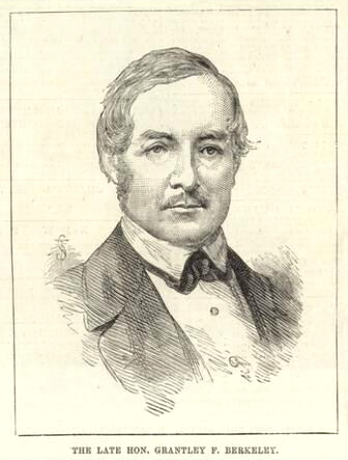
Grantley Berkeley

The Honourable George Charles Grantley FitzHardinge Berkeley (10 February 1800 – 20 February 1881), known as Grantley Berkeley, was a British politician, writer and sportsman.

== Background and education ==
Berkeley was the sixth son of Frederick Berkeley, 5th Earl of Berkeley, by Mary Cole, daughter of William Cole. He was the second son born after his parents were married; four of his elder brothers were deemed illegitimate and unable to inherit the earldom. He was the brother of William Berkeley, 1st Earl FitzHardinge, Maurice Berkeley, 1st Baron FitzHardinge, Henry FitzHardinge Berkeley, Thomas Berkeley, 6th Earl of Berkeley and Craven Berkeley and the nephew of Sir George Cranfield Berkeley. He was educated at the Royal Military College, Sandhurst. He was commissioned into the Coldstream Guards and afterwards transferred to the 82nd Regiment of Foot.

== Political career ==
Berkeley sat as member of parliament for Gloucestershire West from 1832 to 1852 as a Whig. In 1836 he proposed the admission of ladies to the gallery of the House of Commons; this was granted in 1841. After 1852 he devoted himself largely to field sports and writing.

== Writings ==
Berkeley was the author of a number of books, including Berkeley Castle, Sandron Hall, or the Days of Queen Anne (1840), and My Life and Recollections, 4 volumes, (1865–66).

== Assault and duel ==
In 1836, Berkeley assaulted magazine publisher James Fraser over a review he published in Fraser's Magazine of Berkeley Castle. He subsequently fought a duel with the review's author William Maginn. Three rounds of shots were fired, but no one was struck.

== Family ==
Berkeley married Caroline Martha Benfield (1804–1873), daughter of Paul Benfield (1741–1810) and wife Mary Frances, née Swinburne (1771–1828), on 16 August 1824. Their two sons Swinburne and Edward died in 1865 and 1878 respectively. Berkeley was the tenant of Alderney Manor near Poole in Dorset from the early 1860s until 1880. He died on 20 February 1881, aged 81.

Parliament of the United Kingdom
New constituency	Member of Parliament for Gloucestershire West; 1832–1852; With: Hon. Augustus Moreton 1832–1835; The Marquess of Worcester 1835; Robert Blagden Hale 1836–1852	Succeeded by Robert Blagden Hale; Nigel Kingscote
