= Caroline Marland =

British businesswoman (1946–2026)

- Born: Caroline Ann Rushton; 27 May 1946; Dublin, Ireland
- Died: 27 May 2026 (aged 80); The Cotswolds, England
- Education: Aida Foster Theatre School
- Employer(s): The Yorkshire Post; The Times; The Guardian; Bank of Ireland; Competition Commission
- Organization: Institute of Directors
- Spouse: Paul Marland (m. 1984; died 2021)

Caroline Ann Marland (née Rushton; 14 April 1946 – 27 May 2026) was a British businesswoman, advertiser and newspaper managing director. She was the first female advertising director on Fleet Street. She worked for The Guardian newspaper for 25 years and retired as managing director of the Guardian Media Group.

== Early life and career ==
Marland was born in Dublin, Ireland on 14 April 1946. She was educated in Ireland and at the Aida Foster Theatre School in London, England.

She began her career as a telephone saleswoman for The Yorkshire Post. She then moved to The Times, leaving the paper as she was unable to secure a management role.

In 1976, Marland began her career at The Guardian newspaper as telephone sales manager. She worked as the newspaper's advertising director from 1983. When the sales department was merged with The Observer in 1993, Marland retained her position. She was the first woman advertising director on Fleet Street. Marland was appointed managing director of Guardian Media Group in January 1995. On her retirement from The Guardian in 2000, Marland was succeeded as advertising director by Carolyn McCall, who she mentored.

In 2000, Marland was appointed a non-executive director of business magnate Richard Branson's People's Lottery. That year she was critical of Matthew Bannister's appointment as marketing and communications director of the British Broadcasting Company (BBC).

In 2001, Marland was appointed a court director for the Bank of Ireland, alongside Thomas Moran. In 2006, she was promoted to senior independent director of the bank.

Marland was also a member of the board of the professional organisation Institute of Directors and sat on the newspaper panel of the Competition Commission UK. Government ministers, however, blocked her appointment as chair of the Advisory Committee on Advertising.

A photograph of Marland taken by Harry Borden is held in the collection of the National Portrait Gallery.

== Personal life and death ==
In 1984, she married Paul Marland (1940–2021), Conservative Party Member of Parliament for West Gloucestershire, becoming the first Guardian executive to marry a Conservative MP.

Marland died on 27 May 2026 three days after a traffic collision, aged 80.

== Awards ==
- Adwoman Association's Advertising Woman of the Year (1984)
- Campaign's Media Achiever of the Year (2000)
