= Alderley House =

Coordinates: 51.6154°N 2.33635°W

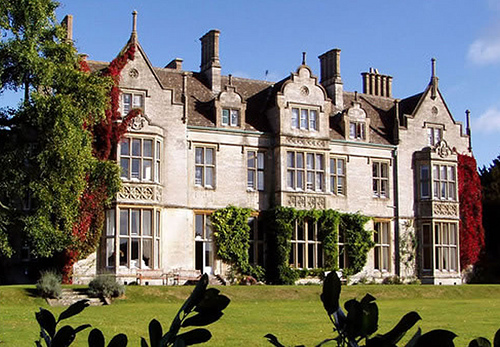
- Alderley House, designed by Lewis Vulliamy for Robert Blagden Hale, the garden front

- Location within Gloucestershire

General information
- Location: Alderley, Gloucestershire
- Construction started: 1656

Technical details
- Size: 23,843 square feet

Design and construction
- Architect: Lewis Vulliamy
- Designations: Grade II

Alderley House is a mid-19th-century 23,843 square feet (2,215.1 m^{2}) Grade II listed country house designed by Lewis Vulliamy and built for Robert Blagden Hale in the Cotswold village of Alderley, near Wotton-under-Edge in Gloucestershire, England. It was built on the site of The Lower House, a 17th-century manor house built by Sir Matthew Hale, a lawyer. The house is situated immediately to the southwest of St Kenelm's Church. In 2009 it was sold to an American oil executive who restored the house as a private home after 70 years as a preparatory school, Rose Hill School.

The first 350 years' history of the site is linked to the Hale family. The Lower House (the original property on the present day Alderley House site) was built by Sir Matthew Hale after his purchase of the manor of Alderley in 1656. In the latter part of the 18th century, The Upper House (the original manor house) was rebuilt by another Matthew Hale on the lower slopes of nearby Winner Hill, and this property subsequently became the family's principal seat. In 1859, the position was reversed again when Robert Blagden Hale had The Upper House completely demolished and The Lower House partially torn down, rebuilding the latter in a more fashionable style to the designs of Lewis Vulliamy. Materials from both of the earlier houses were used in the construction of the new property.

Both The Lower House and its successor, Alderley House, were mainly used by the Hale family as a private residence until the early 20th century. In around 1925 the property was occupied by a crammer school and in 1939 it became the home of Rose Hill School when the school relocated from Banstead, Surrey following the outbreak of the Second World War. In the same year the late-10th-century will of Æthelgifu was discovered in one of the outbuildings. In 2009 a merger with Querns Westonbirt School saw the new entity co-locating with Westonbirt School in Tetbury and the site at Alderley sold. Alderley House is again a private home.

== History ==
=== Sir Matthew Hale's original 17th-century house ===
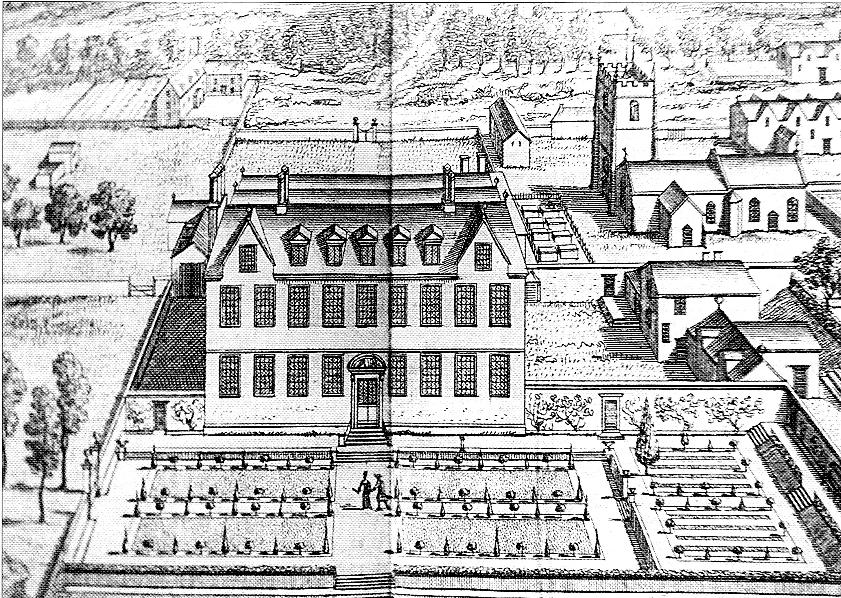
Kyp's depiction of The Lower House as built by Sir Matthew Hale in 1656–62, a nine-bayed property with gables at either end and dormer windows in between. St Kenelm's Church can be seen in the background, immediately adjacent to the property.

The Hales of Alderley were the leading gentry family in the Wotton-under-Edge area of Gloucestershire from the beginning of the 17th century until the early 20th century. Alderley is situated 2 miles to the south of Wotton-under-Edge, between two brooks, the Ozleworth and Kilcott, underneath Winner Hill, and in the 16th and 17th century it was home to a number of woollen mills. The first of the Hale family's houses in the village was West End House, built in 1608 by Robert Hale (c. 1572 – 1614), a barrister at Lincoln's Inn. He was the second son of another Robert Hale who had made his money as a successful cloth merchant in Wotton-under-Edge. The younger Robert Hale had acquired land in the village in 1599 through his marriage to Joan Poyntz (1577–1612), the daughter of Matthew Poyntz, a gentleman living in the village at that time. This house was substantially rebuilt in the 18th century, but continued to be called West End House until the mid-19th century; today it is known as Alderley Grange and is a Grade II listed building.

Robert and Joan's only child, the jurist Sir Matthew Hale (1609–1676), bought the manor of Alderley in 1656, some 50 years after being born in West End House. The manor was acquired in an exchange with Andrew Barker of Fairford Park for that at Meysey Hampton. Between 1656 and 1662 Hale had The Lower House built, a new house so called in order to distinguish it from the original manor house (The Upper House) on the other side of the road.

Both of Hale's parents died before he was five and he was brought up by Anthony Kingscot, a close relative and devout puritan. Hale remained firmly religious throughout his life and it is possible that this influenced his choice of location for the house: immediately to the southwest of St Kenelm's Church, whose origins date back to c. 1450. In 1663, the year after the construction of The Lower House was completed, Sir Matthew Hale was granted the right of way from his new manor house into the churchyard. The Lower House was then to remain the Hale family home for the next 100 years. A substantial property, a nine-bay house with gables at either end and five small dormer windows in between, it was completed in the same year that Parliament introduced the hearth tax, and the surviving Hearth Tax Assessment records a house of 18 hearths.

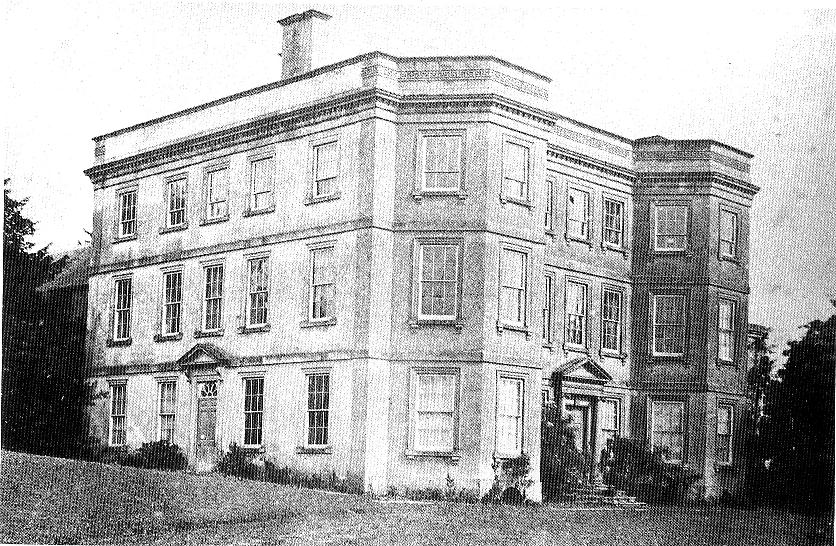
An early photo of The Upper House as rebuilt on the lower slopes of Winner Hill by Matthew Hale in 1776–80.

In 1676 ill-health forced Hale to resign as Lord Chief Justice and he retired to Alderley where he died on Christmas Day the same year; he was buried in St Kenelm's churchyard. His first wife Anne Moore, daughter of Sir Henry Moore and granddaughter of Sir Francis Moore, had borne him 10 children. He outlived all but the eldest daughter and the youngest son and, as a result, had taken some of his grandchildren into his care after the death of their parents. It was to these grandchildren that he left his estate, while he bequeathed West End House to his daughter, Mary; the latter property subsequently passed out of the family when it was sold by one of her descendants in the middle of the 18th century, around which time it was substantially rebuilt. (Note: In Nick Kingsley's series The Country Houses of Gloucestershire, he makes 3 references to West End House (now Alderley Grange) being bequeathed by Robert Hale to his daughter and it then passing out of the Hale family in the subsequent generation: Volume I (2nd ed., 2001), p.38; Volume II (1st ed., 1992) pp.50, 256. However, Robert Hale did not have a daughter, Sir Matthew Hale - his son - was an only child, and in Matthew Hale's will he leaves instructions that his father's house should be left to his daughter, i.e. Robert Hale's granddaughter.)

For a period of more than one hundred years following the death of Sir Matthew Hale, The Lower House remained the family seat. However, between 1776 and 1780, another Matthew Hale, possibly Sir Matthew Hale's great-grandson, decided to rebuild The Upper House on the lower slopes of nearby Winner Hill to the east of St Kenelm's Church, after which this became the new family home; consequently, The Lower House may have been abandoned for a while.

=== Lewis Vulliamy's 19th-century redesign for Robert Blagden Hale ===
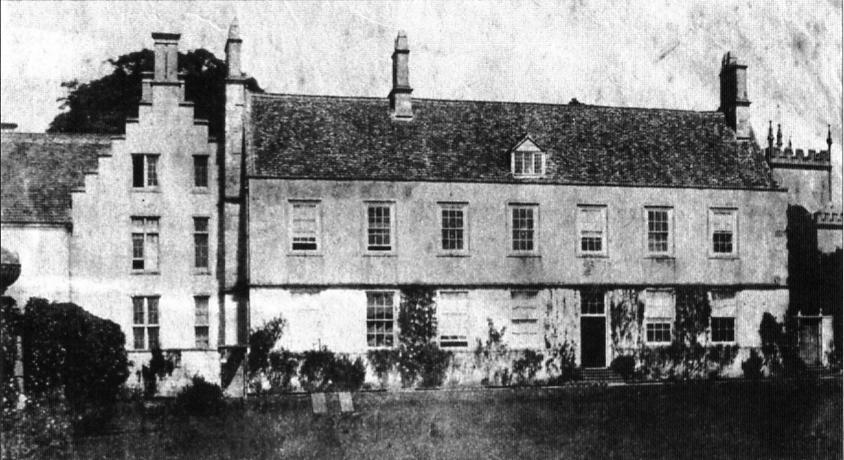
An early photo of The Lower House prior to its substantial demolition in 1859 but after the addition of the 1844 service wing with its distinctive crow-stepped gable. The photo shows the simplified main range: in the 18th century, the farthest two bays on the east side were removed, as were both gables and all but the resultant central dormer window.

In 1805, when The Upper House was the main Hale family residence, Robert Hale Blagden Hale (1780–1855) inherited the properties in Alderley. In the 1830s, his eldest son, Robert Blagden Hale (1807–1883), brother of the Rt. Rev. Matthew Blagden Hale, chose The Lower House when he set up his own independent establishment. At that time, prevailing Victorian attitudes expanded the number of servants that households were expected to contain, whilst simultaneously endeavouring to ensure that male and female servants were kept separate wherever possible. In 1844 he had a new service wing added to the west side of the house: the wing had a distinctive crow-stepped gable to the garden front and is thought to have been designed by Lewis Vulliamy.

In 1855, on the death of his father who had been managing the family estates, Robert Blagden Hale, then Tory MP for West Gloucestershire, found himself in possession of various properties including Cottles House - another manor house in West Wiltshire, built in 1775-78 for Robert Hale and inherited by his father in 1814 - as well as the two large houses in Alderley, both of which were unfashionable and dilapidated. He progressively withdrew from his official appointments in order to devote himself to the life of a country gentleman and in 1857 he resigned as an MP and sold Cottles House. Two years later in 1859 he had both The Upper House and most of The Lower House demolished in order to build a new manor house in a more fashionable style: of The Lower House, the south end of the service wing built in 1844 and the original Jacobean cellars were retained, but the only surviving remnants of The Upper House are a pair of 18th-century gatepiers in the village and a restored Gothick folly of 1779 on the summit of Winner Hill. Alderley House, as the new house was named) was built on the site of The Lower House to the designs of Lewis Vulliamy, utilising the original cellars and incorporating the retained part of the 1844 service wing as the property's west wing. Materials from the demolition of both The Upper House and The Lower House, including one of the staircases, were used in the construction.

The house is built of ashlar with a Cotswold stone slate roof. It forms three sides of an entrance court, with a shallow, single storey porch in the middle of the central range making a token gesture at an E-plan. The parapet above the entrance porch features a heron's head motif (the Hale family crest) above the initials of Robert Blagden Hale. The main body of the house is a double-pile, a type of compact plan in which rooms face outwards in both directions from a central dividing wall, a style that became standard for country houses from the Restoration onwards. Alderley House was one of the earliest examples of a double-pile plan in Gloucestershire, and its entrance court range consists of 3 full storeys whereas the garden side range has 2 storeys and attics.

Including the new decoration and furnishings and the architect's commission, the total cost of building the house was £16,746 15s 8d. This represents the lower end of the range of country house building costs in the Victorian period; it is a modest sum in comparison with the cost of Westonbirt House, also designed by Vulliamy, whose construction for Robert Stayner Holford, Robert Blagden Hale's brother-in-law, began after the completion of the redesigned Alderley House.

=== After Robert Blagden Hale ===
Robert Blagden Hale married Anne Jane Holford in 1832 and they had five children. Their sons were Robert Hale (1834–1907) who later became a Major-General in the British military and Mathew Holford Hale (1835–1912) who became a colonel. Their daughters were Anne Hale (1833–1912), Georgina Hale (1836–1934) and Theodosia Hale (1838–1922). Of the five children only one (Anne) married and the other four lived at Alderley House for most of their lives. Anne, the eldest daughter, married Thomas Henry Sherwood in 1859. Robert Blagden Hale died in 1883 and his eldest son, Robert Hale, inherited Alderley House, with the two unmarried sisters Georgina and Theodosia, living with him. These living arrangements are mentioned by the artist A.S. Hartrick in his memoirs. Robert Hale died in 1907 and his younger brother Mathew inherited the house. Mathew died in 1912 and Anne Sherwood, his sister, then inherited. According to the terms of the will of their father she added the name Hale to her surname, becoming Anne Sherwood-Hale. She died in the same year, and her eldest son Thomas Edward Sherwood-Hale inherited.

Thomas Edward Sherwood-Hale JP MBE (1861–1945) lived much of his life in New Zealand. After the First World War, he moved into the house for a few years, but after that he resided at the nearby Mount House. which was also owned by the Hale family. In about 1925 Alderley House was let to a Major Lionel Wynne-Wilson who ran it as a crammer. At the outbreak of the Second World War in 1939, the house was again empty and Rose Hill School was evacuated to it from Banstead in Surrey. In the same year the late 10th-century will of Æthelgifu was discovered by James Fairhurst among material in one of the outbuildings. This document formed part of the literary effects of John Selden (1584–1654), of whose estate Sir Matthew Hale was both one of the executors and one of the beneficiaries. The school remained for the duration of the war and when Thomas Sherwood-Hale died in 1945, his son Robert Goodenough Sherwood-Hale inherited the house. Alderley House was subsequently made the permanent home for Rose Hill School, Alderley, with the school trustees purchasing the freehold in 1950.

In 2009, Rose Hill School, Alderley merged with Querns Westonbirt School to form Rose Hill Westonbirt School. The new school co-located with Westonbirt School in the grounds of Westonbirt House in nearby Tetbury, rendering the property at Alderley surplus to requirements. A change of use for the property was approved by Stroud District Council and it was subsequently marketed as a private home for c.£3m at the end of 2009. After purchasing the house, the new owners restored the house to its original state in 1860. On 25 October 2010, the Alderley House Bottling Company LLP was established following the discovery of a natural spring beneath one of the former classrooms; bottled at source, this water is the only Cotswold-drawn bottled natural mineral water on the market and is sold under the name Alderley Cotswold Natural Spring Water. In 2017 the house was sold for in excess of £7 million.

== Historical timeline ==
	1599	Land at Alderley acquired by Robert Hale by virtue of his marriage to Joan Poyntz.
	1608	West End House (now known as The Grange, or Alderley Grange) built for Robert Hale.
	1656	The manor of Alderley acquired by Sir Matthew Hale.
	1662	Construction of The Lower House completed for Sir Matthew Hale.
	1663	Right of way from The Lower House into the churchyard of St Kenelm's Church granted to Sir Matthew Hale.
	1676	Death of Sir Matthew Hale.
	1776 - 1780	The Upper House rebuilt on the lower slopes of nearby Winner Hill by another Matthew Hale, becoming the new family home; The Lower House may have been abandoned.
	1805	Properties at Alderley inherited by Robert Hale Blagden Hale.
(circa)	1835	The Lower House chosen by Robert Blagden Hale (son of Robert Hale Blagden Hale) as his establishment.
	1844	Service wing added to west side of The Lower House.
	1859	Demolition of both The Upper House and most of The Lower House (cellars and 1844 service wing retained), construction of current Alderley House on the site of The Lower House started.
	1863	Construction of current Alderley House completed.
	1883	Death of Robert Blagden Hale; ownership of Alderley House passed to his eldest son Major-General Robert Hale
	1907	Death of Major-General Robert Hale; ownership of Alderley House passed to his younger brother Colonel Mathew Hale
	1912	Death of Colonel Mathew Hale in January 1912 and his sister Anne Sherwood-Hale inherits Alderley House
	1912	Death of Anne Sherwood-Hale in September 1912 and her son Thomas Edward Sherwood-Hale inherits Alderley House
(circa)	1925	Alderley House let to Major Lionel Wynne-Wilson for use as a crammer.
	1939	Rose Hill School evacuated to the then empty Alderley House from Banstead, Surrey; the will of Æthelgifu discovered in one of the outbuildings.
	1950	Freehold of Alderley House purchased by trustees of Rose Hill School.
	2009	Rose Hill Westonbirt School formed by the merger of Rose Hill School, Alderley and Querns Westonbirt School and co-located with Westonbirt School in nearby Tetbury. Change of use for Alderley property approved by Stroud District Council and Alderley House sold for use as a private residence. Restoration of the house commissioned by the new owners.

== Miscellany ==
Vulliamy's original plans for the redesign were the addition of a range of rooms on the north side of the house, but this scheme was abandoned and the more radical reconstruction plan adopted. The portrait of Sir Matthew Hale which hangs in Alderley House is a copy or replica: the original hangs in the Guildhall and was placed there by the thankful citizens of London after Hale offered his services in the aftermath of the Great Fire of London.

In September 2009 the property was used as one of the filming locations for an episode of BBC1's hospital drama Casualty which aired in early 2010.
