= Rose Hill School, Alderley =

Rose Hill School
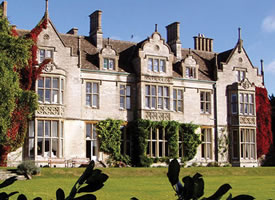
- Alderley House, the main building of the former school

Location
- Alderley nr. Wotton-under-Edge, Gloucestershire, GL12 7QT; England; 51.6154°N 2.33635°W

Information
- Type: Preparatory school
- Motto: Conando floreamus
- Religious affiliation: Anglican
- Established: 1839
- Founder: T Alfree
- Closed: 2 September 2009
- Headmaster: Paul Cawley-Wakefield
- Gender: Co-educational
- Age: 2 to 14
- Houses: Romans, Greeks, Trojans
- Colours: Pink and Blue
- Website: www.oldrosehillians.co.uk

Rose Hill School was a co-educational, boarding and day, Pre-preparatory and Preparatory School for children aged 2–14 years old. It was situated in Cotswold countryside in the village of Alderley, near to Wotton-under-Edge in Gloucestershire, England. The school closed on 2 September 2009 to merge with Querns Westonbirt School, together forming Rose Hill Westonbirt School which is co-located with Westonbirt School in nearby Tetbury.

== History ==
Rose Hill School was originally established in Royal Tunbridge Wells, Kent in 1832. In 1903 the then Headmaster, Mr Browning, founded a second Rose Hill School in Banstead, Surrey, taking the vast majority of the original school with him. Following the outbreak of World War II, this second Rose Hill School re-located to the small village of Alderley, near Wotton-under-Edge in Gloucestershire in 1939. The then Headmaster, T. G. Hughes, bought the 20-acre site of Alderley House, a Grade II Listed neo-Elizabethan 19th-century manor house designed by Lewis Vulliamy and built for Robert Blagden Hale between 1859 and 1863. The house was built on the site of a previous Jacobean property, and the cellars from the original building remain to this day under the house. On the ground floor of the house were located the dining room, the library, the Headmaster's study, two classrooms, the school office, a billiards hall, a small laundry, the staff room, the staff dining room and the kitchens, whilst the upper floors (including the former servants' quarters on the top floor) provided the Sick-Bay and all dormitory accommodation and washing facilities for boarding pupils, as well as living quarters for the matrons and some teachers. All of the dormitories were named after local villages, including Alderley, Badminton, Hawkesbury, Hillesley, Kingswood and Stinchcombe.

The sizeable grounds in which the school was situated included a number of spinneys, two grass tennis courts, a hard court, an outside swimming pool and a large playing field, and it adjoined St Kenelm's Church. The grounds directly to the west of the house were dominated by a mature Wellingtonia tree, a very tall specimen of the Giant Sequoia family, while on the other side of the house towards St Kenelm's Church were two Monkey-Puzzle trees.

== Closure of the School ==
After 70 years at the Alderley site, Rose Hill School closed on 2 September 2009 when it merged with Querns Westonbirt School (formerly Querns School, Cirencester until its acquisition by Westonbirt School in 2002). Together the two schools formed Rose Hill Westonbirt School which is co-located with Westonbirt School in nearby Tetbury. Weston Birt School Limited (Company Registration No. 230224, Registered Charity No. 311715) acquired the undertakings, assets and liabilities of Rose Hill School Alderley Limited (Company No. 911698, Registered Charity No. 311708) for £1.798 m on 29 August 2008. The property at Alderley was put on the market at the end of 2009 for £3m and subsequently sold for use as a private residence. After purchasing the house the new owners employed Humphrey Cook Associates to refurbish the property back to its original state in 1860.

In September 2009 the property was used as one of the filming locations for a Season 24 episode of BBC1's hospital drama Casualty which aired in early 2010.

In documents filed since the sale of the property the house has been referred to as "Alderley Manor", whereas the Land Registry still refers to it as "Alderley House". There also appears to be a reference to the property as "Alderley Manor" in the National Archives, in the context of R. H. Blagden Hale's purchase deeds.

== Headmasters ==
2005–2009	Paul Cawley-Wakefield
2002–2005	Peter Platts-Martin
2002-2002	Ginny Jackson (Acting Head)
1990-2002	Richard Lyne-Pirkis (author who wrote as Richard de Methley))
:
1982-1988	Kenneth Green
1982	David Austin (Acting Head)
1978-1982	Christopher Knox
1956–1978	Gilbert Wheat
1922-1956	T. Geoffrey Hughes

== Notable former pupils ==
- Robert Lawrence, British Army officer
