= Alderley, Gloucestershire =

Village in Gloucestershire, England

Coordinates: 51.616°N 2.335°W

Alderley
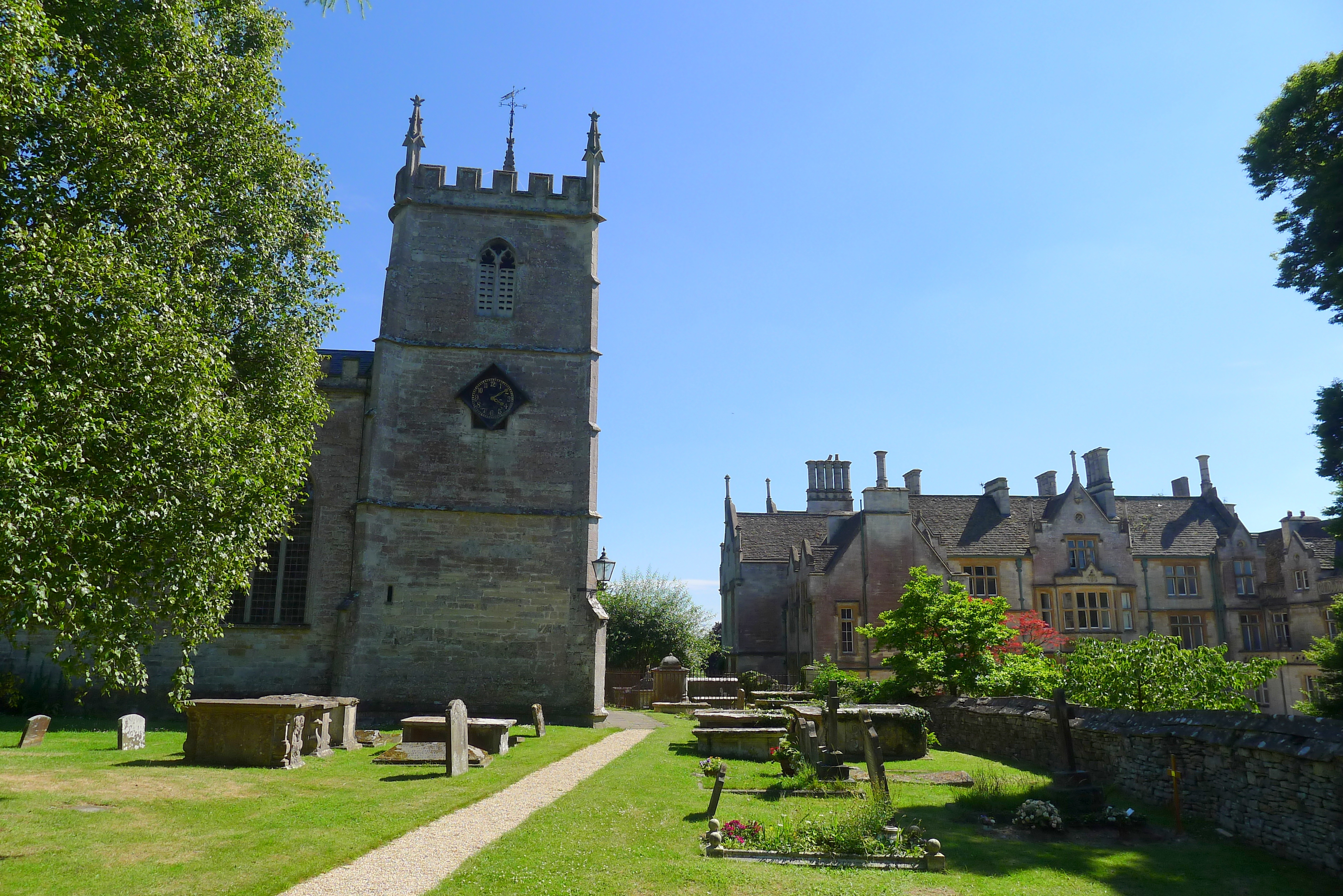
- St Kenelm's Church and Alderley House

- Location within Gloucestershire
- Population: 351
- OS grid reference: ST768908
- Civil parish: Alderley
- District: Stroud
- Shire county: Gloucestershire
- Region: South West
- Country: England
- Sovereign state: United Kingdom
- Post town: Wotton-under-Edge
- Postcode district: GL12
- Dialling code: 01453
- Police: Gloucestershire
- Fire: Gloucestershire
- Ambulance: South Western
- UK Parliament: South Cotswolds

Alderley (also previously known as Alderleigh) is a village and civil parish in the Stroud district of Gloucestershire, England, about fourteen miles southwest of Stroud and two miles south of Wotton-under-Edge. It is situated on the Cotswold Way near to the villages of Hillesley and Tresham and lies underneath Winner Hill between two brooks, the Ozleworth and Kilcott.

== History ==
The village has an entry in the Domesday Book of 1086, where it is referred to as Alrelie meaning "Woodland clearing where alders grow" (from OE alor + lēah). Records show that the village is located in the hundred of Grimboldestou with a total population of sixteen (16) households (Note: In the Domesday Book, "population" is counted in heads of families, so the actual population was probably up to five times larger) (7 villagers, 5 smallholders, 4 slaves) whilst also boasting 2 lord's plough teams, 7 men's plough teams, 12 acres of meadows and 1 mill; in 1066 the Lord of the Estate was the Anglo-Saxon thegn Wigot of Wallingford, whereas in 1086 it was the wealthy Norman landowner Miles Crispin.

In a later 1309 document the village is referred to as Alreleye, and in a 1345 document as Alrely.

In the 16th and 17th centuries, the village contained a number of woollen mills, and in Samuel Rudder's A New History of Gloucestershire published in 1779 he states that Alderley had been home to the clothing industry for hundreds of years.

In A Topographical Dictionary of England by Samuel Lewis published in 1831, Alderley is described thus:

ALDERLEY, a parish in the upper division of GRUMBALD'S ASH, county of GLOUCESTER, 2 miles (S.S.E.) from Wotton under Edge, containing 235 inhabitants. The living is a discharged rectory, in the archdeaconry and diocese of Gloucester, rated in the king's books at £ 11. 4. 7., and in the patronage of Mr. and Mrs. Hale. The village is situated on a hill between two streams, which unite and fall into the LOWER AVON. Cornua ammonis and other fossils are found here. Sir Matthew Hale, Lord Chief Justice in the reign of Charles II., born here 1 November 1609, lies interred in the church.

As part of the local government changes of the early 1970s, Alderley was the only parish of Sodbury Rural District not to form part of the newly created district of Northavon in the county of Avon, instead joining Stroud district in Gloucestershire.

== Architecture ==
The village contains several interesting buildings:

- The church, dedicated to Saint Kenelm, was rebuilt in Gothic style in 1802, but the tower dates back to c.1450. Marianne North, biologist and botanical artist, is buried in the churchyard.
- Immediately to the southwest of St Kenelm's Church is Alderley House, a 19th-century neo-Elizabethan manor house designed by Lewis Vulliamy for Robert Blagden Hale and built in 1859–1863. The house is located on the site of an earlier Jacobean country house built by the jurist Sir Matthew Hale in 1656–1662. For the 70 years following the outbreak of World War II, the property served as the site for Rose Hill School, an independent day and boarding preparatory school, until its merger in 2009 with Querns Westonbirt School. The merger formed the Rose Hill Westonbirt School, which relocated to nearby Tetbury, and the vacant property was sold for use once again as a private residence.
- Alderley Grange was rebuilt, probably by a Bristol architect, about 1760; it occupies the site of an earlier house where Matthew Hale was born. It was the home of James Lees-Milne, the architectural writer and memoirist, and his wife Alvilde Lees-Milne, who created a much-admired garden.
