= On Heroes, Hero-Worship, & the Heroic in History =

1841 book by Thomas Carlyle

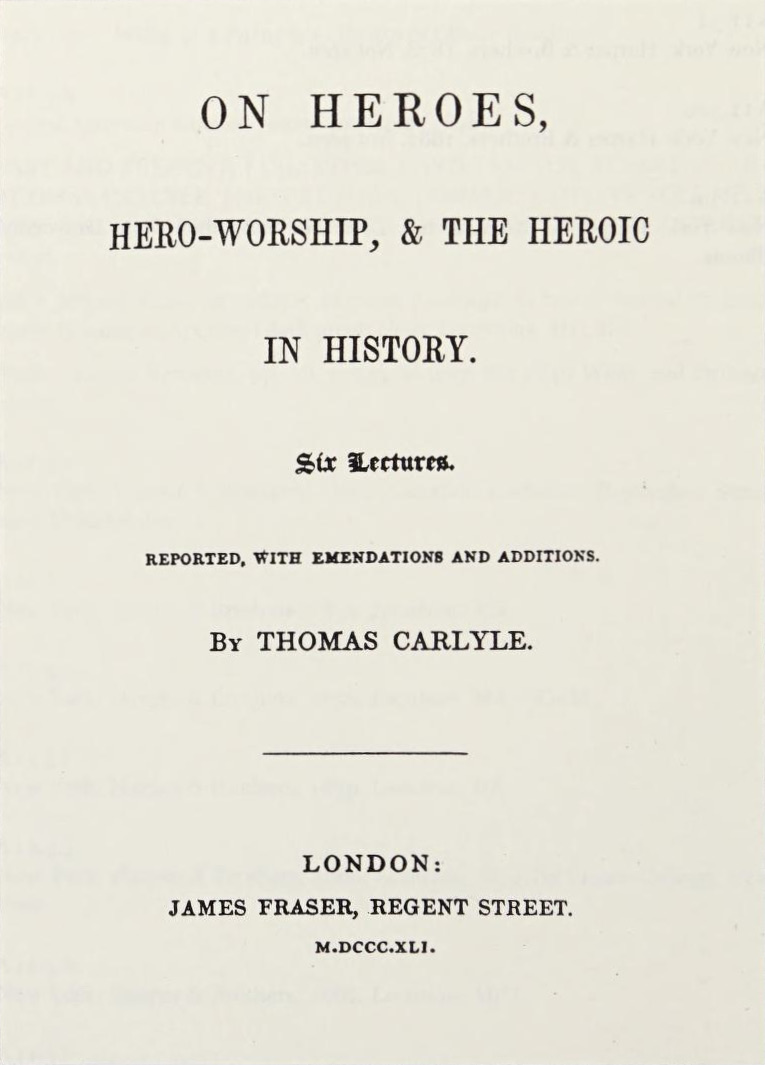
- Title page of the first English edition
- Author: Thomas Carlyle
- Language: English
- Published: 1841
- Publisher: James Fraser
- Publication place: England

On Heroes, Hero-Worship, & the Heroic in History is a book by the Scottish essayist, historian and philosopher Thomas Carlyle, published by James Fraser, London, in 1841. It is a collection of six lectures given in May 1840 about prominent historical figures. It lays out Carlyle's belief in the importance of heroic leadership.

== Background ==
The book was based on a course of lectures Carlyle had given. The French Revolution: A History had brought Carlyle recognition, but little money, so friends organized courses of public lectures, drumming up an audience and selling one guinea tickets. Though Carlyle disliked lecturing, he discovered a facility for it; more importantly, it brought in much-needed income. Between 1837 and 1840, Carlyle delivered four such courses of lectures, the final of which was on "Heroes". His lecture notes were transformed into the book, with the effects of the spoken discourse still discernible in the prose.

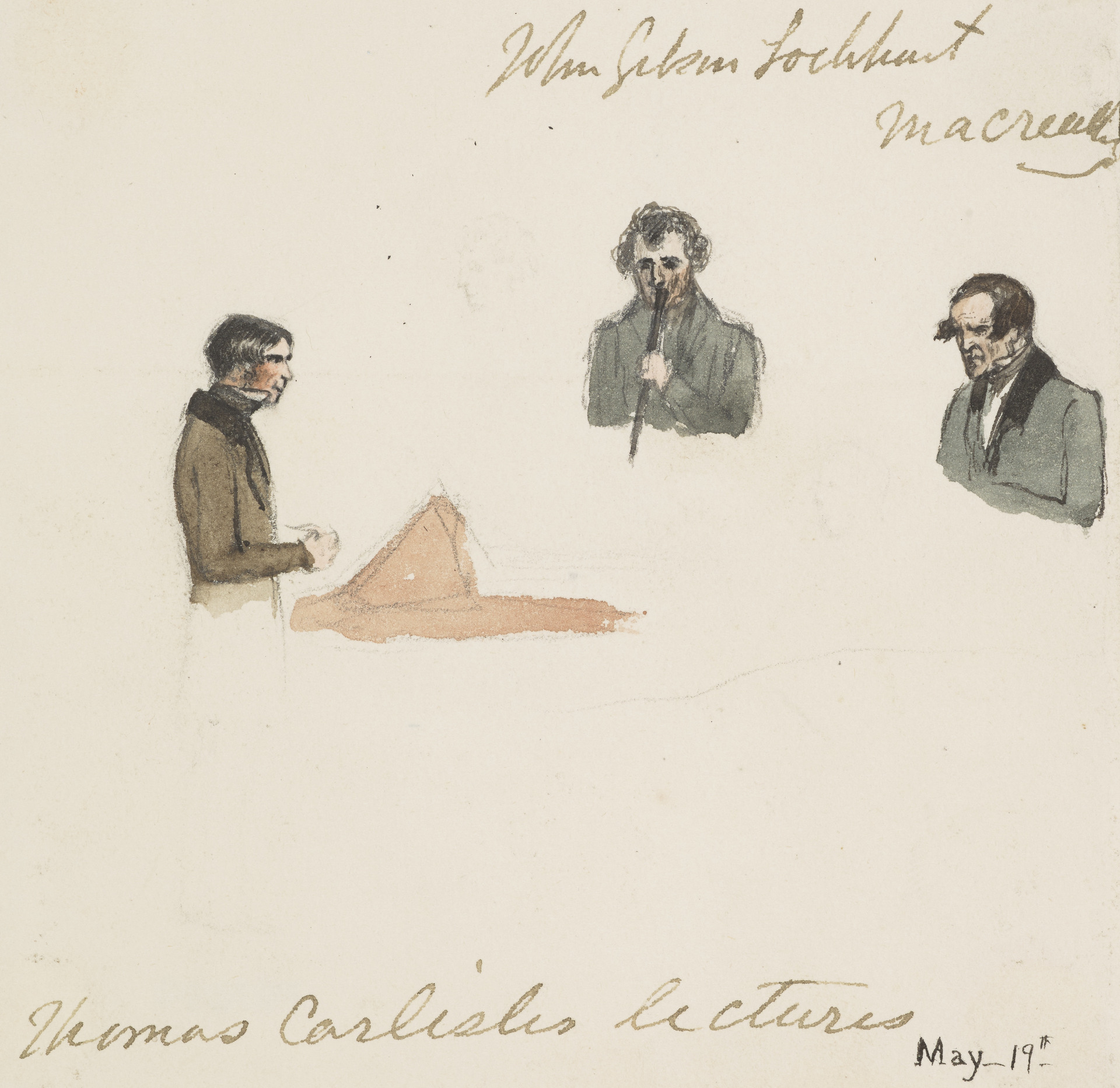
'Thomas Carliles Lectures' by Jemima Blackburn, with John Gibson Lockhart and William Macready in the audience

"The Hero as Man of Letters" (1840):

- "In books lies the soul of the whole Past Time; the articulate audible voice of the Past, when the body and material substance of it has altogether vanished like a dream."
- "A man lives by believing something; not by debating and arguing about many things."
- "All that mankind has done, thought, gained or been: it is lying as in magic preservation in the pages of books."
- "What we become depends on what we read after all of the professors have finished with us. The greatest university of all is a collection of books."
- "The suffering man ought really to consume his own smoke; there is no good in emitting smoke till you have made it into fire."
- "Adversity is sometimes hard upon a man; but for one man who can stand prosperity, there are a hundred that will stand adversity." (Often shortened to "can't stand prosperity" as an unknown quote.)
- "Not what I have, but what I do, is my kingdom."

=== Lectures ===
1. (5 May) The Hero as Divinity. Odin. Paganism: Scandinavian Mythology
2. (8 May) The Hero as Prophet. Mahomet: Islam
3. (12 May) The Hero as Poet. Dante; Shakespeare
4. (15 May) The Hero as Priest. Luther; Reformation: Knox; Puritanism
5. (19 May) The Hero as Man of Letters. Johnson, Rousseau, Burns
6. (22 May) The Hero as King. Cromwell. Napoleon: Modern Revolutionism

== Summary ==
Carlyle was one of the few philosophers who lived through the British Industrial Revolution but maintained a non-materialistic view of historical development. The book included lectures discussing people ranging from the field of religion through to literature and politics. The figures chosen for each lecture were presented by Carlyle as archetypal examples of individuals who, in their respective fields of endeavour, had dramatically impacted history in some way. The Islamic prophet Muhammad found a place in the book in the lecture titled "The Hero as Prophet". In his work, Carlyle outlined Muhammad as a Hegelian agent of reform, insisting on his sincerity and commenting "how one man single-handedly, could weld warring tribes and wandering Bedouins into a most powerful and civilized nation in less than two decades". His interpretation has been widely cited by Muslim scholars to show Muhammad without orientalist bias.

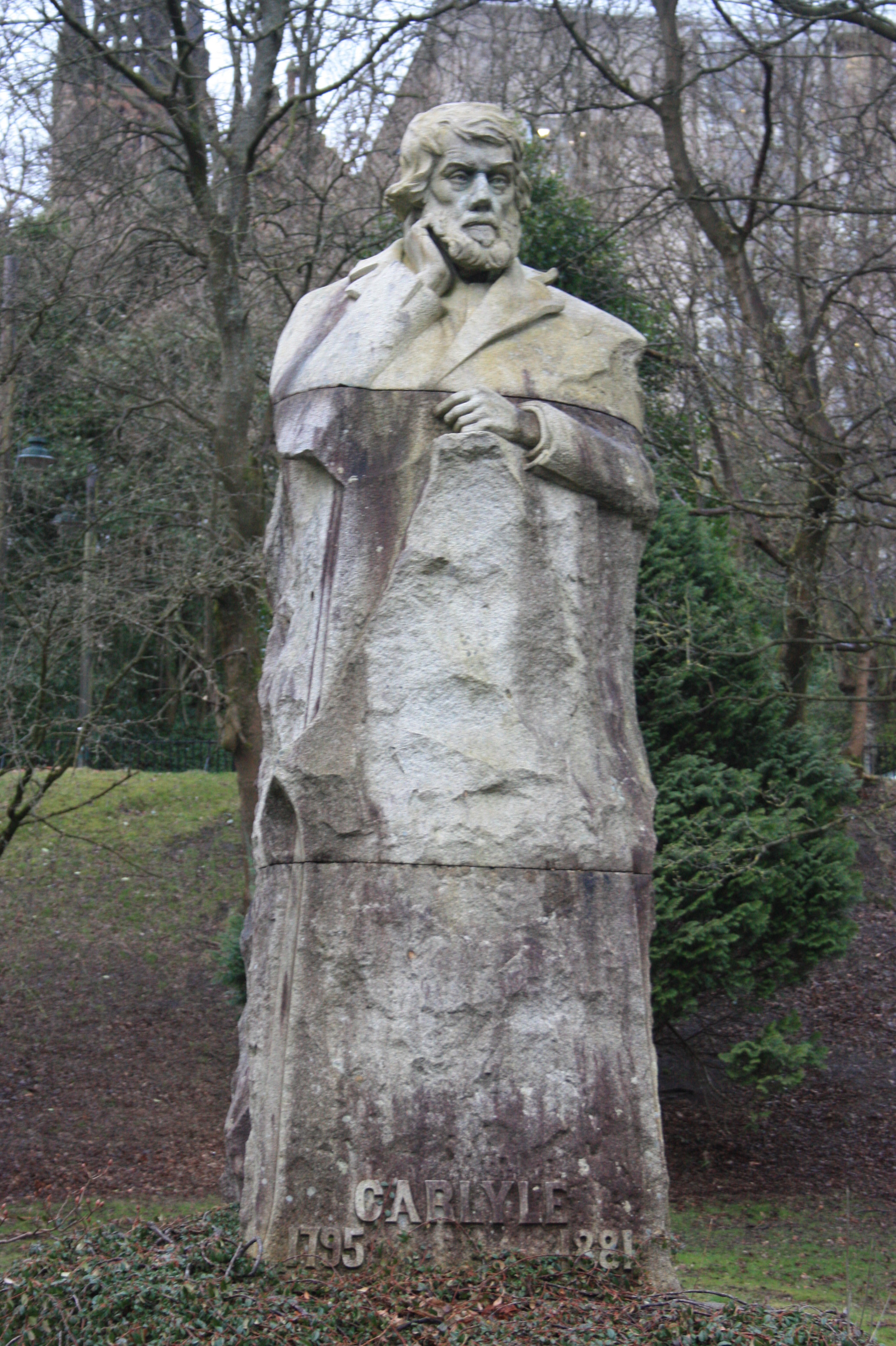
Monument to Thomas Carlyle by William Kellock Brown, Kelvingrove Park, Glasgow

Carlyle held that "Great Men should rule and that others should revere them," a view that for him was supported by a complex faith in history and evolutionary progress. Societies, like organisms, evolve throughout history, thrive for a time, but inevitably become weak and die out, giving place to a stronger, superior breed. Heroes are those who affirm this life process, accepting its cruelty as necessary and thus good. For them courage is a more valuable virtue than love; heroes are noblemen, not saints. The hero functions first as a pattern for others to imitate, and second as a creator, moving history forwards not backward (history being the biography of great men). Carlyle was among the first of his age to recognize that the death of God is in itself nothing to be happy about, unless man steps in and creates new values to replace the old. For Carlyle, the hero should become the object of worship, the centre of a new religion proclaiming humanity as "the miracle of miracles... the only divinity we can know". For Carlyle's creed Bentley proposes the name "heroic vitalism", a term embracing both a political theory, aristocratic radicalism, and a metaphysic, supernatural naturalism. The heroic vitalists feared that the recent trends toward democracy would hand over power to the ill-bred, uneducated, and immoral, whereas their belief in a transcendent force in nature directing itself onward and upward gave some hope that this overarching force would overrule in favor of the strong, intelligent, and noble.

For Carlyle, the hero was somewhat similar to Aristotle's "magnanimous" man – a person who flourished in the fullest sense. However, for Carlyle, unlike Aristotle, the world was filled with contradictions with which the hero had to deal. All heroes will be flawed. Their heroism lay in their creative energy in the face of these difficulties, not in their moral perfection. To sneer at such a person for their failings is the philosophy of those who seek comfort in the conventional. Carlyle called this "valetism", from the expression "no man is a hero to his valet".

== Reception and legacy ==
University of British Columbia professor Michael K. Goldberg writes:

The gospel of heroes met resistance from nineteenth-century liberalism for ignoring the masses; from Engels, at least, among nineteenth-century Marxists for being too religious and mystical; from some segments of the established church for being too radical; and later from some twentieth-century democrats for being too tyrannical.

Two reviews which appeared in the Christian Remembrancer in 1843 provide representative reactions to On Heroes. Archbishop of York William Thomson denounced Carlyle's syncretism, writing: "It is not a Christian Book." In response, theologian Frederick Denison Maurice defended Carlyle's emphasis on truth over semblances, as well as his ability to challenge and test the sincerity of readers that disagree with him.

The impact of On Heroes on intellectuals and the reading public was deep and continued long after its publication. Richard Garnett wrote that its ideas were "echoed by all the best minds of [the] day", while Edmund Gosse reported in 1900 that "it is read by practically every one who reads at all". Vincent van Gogh wrote to his brother Theo in 1883 that it was "a very beautiful little book."

Henry David Thoreau compared it favourably with previous writings on heroism such as Parallel Lives, opining that Carlyle "even leaves Plutarch behind." These lectures are regarded as an early and powerful formulation of the Great Man theory of historical development. Friedrich Nietzsche agreed with much of Carlyle's hero worship, transferring many qualities of the hero to his concept of the Übermensch.

Elizabeth Barrett Browning referenced the work in the 5th book of Aurora Leigh (1856). George Bernard Shaw took inspiration from On Heroes in his plays Arms and the Man (1894), The Man of Destiny (1897), Man and Superman (1905), and Back to Methuselah (1920).

Mahatma Gandhi read "The Hero as Prophet" in his studies of Islam and "learnt of the Prophet's greatness and bravery and austere living."

Otto Weininger drew on this work to supplement his discussion of the masculine and the feminine in Sex and Character (1903).

Frédéric Masson spoke favourably of the Carlylean hero in his introduction to the fifth volume of Napoléon et sa famille (1902).

Deena Weinstein detects the influence of On Heroes in the rock music phenomenon of the "guitar hero," as epitomised in the 1960s meme "Clapton is God".

== See also ==
- Heroes in historical studies
- Representative Men – a similar series of lectures, given by Carlyle's American contemporary Ralph Waldo Emerson

== Bibliography ==
- Bentley, Eric (1957). A Century of Hero-Worship: A study of the idea of heroism in Carlyle and Nietzsche, with notes on Wagner, Spengler, Stefan George, and D. H. Lawrence (Second, revised and reset ed.). Boston: Beacon Press.
- Carlyle, Thomas (1993). Goldberg, Michael K.; Brattin, Joel J.; Engel, Mark (eds.). On Heroes, Hero-Worship, and the Heroic in History. The Norman and Charlotte Strouse Edition of the Writings of Thomas Carlyle. Berkeley and Los Angeles: University of California Press. ISBN 978-0-520-91153-6.
- Crow, M. M. (1946). "The Hero as Desperado". The Library Chronicle of the University of Texas. II (1): 3–16.
- Garnett, Richard (1887). Life of Thomas Carlyle. London: Walter Scott.
- Harrold, Charles Frederick (1934). "Carlyle and Heroes". Carlyle and German Thought, 1819–1834. New Haven: Yale University Press. pp. 180–196.
- Kusch, Robert (1969-01-01). "Pattern and Paradox in Heroes and Hero-Worship". Studies in Scottish Literature. 6 (3): 146–155. ISSN 0039-3770.
- Lehman, B. H. (1928). Carlyle's Theory of the Hero: Its Sources, Development, History, and Influence on Carlyle's Work. Durham, N.C.: Duke University Press. hdl:2027/mdp.39015008382213.
- Seigel, Jules Paul, ed. (1971). Thomas Carlyle: The Critical Heritage. The Critical Heritage Series. London: Routledge & Kegan Paul. ISBN 978-0-7100-7090-6.
- Tennyson, G. B. (1973). "Thomas Carlyle". In DeLaura, David J. (ed.). Victorian Prose: A Guide to Research. New York: The Modern Language Association of America. pp. 93–94. ISBN 978-0-87352-250-2.
- Wyatt, W. Montgomery (1955). "Carlyle on Muhammad". The Hibbert Journal. LIII (3): 247–254.
