= Randal Edward Sherborne Plunkett =

British politician

Randal Edward Sherborne Plunkett (15 November 1848 – 25 December 1883) was a British Conservative politician.

He was the eldest son of Admiral Edward Plunkett, 16th Baron of Dunsany, and the Hon. Anne Constance, daughter of John Dutton, 2nd Baron Sherborne. The agricultural reformer and pioneer of the cooperative movement, Sir Horace Plunkett, was his younger brother.

Plunkett was elected Member of Parliament for Gloucestershire West in 1874, a seat he held until 1880.

Plunkett died unmarried in Madeira in December 1883, aged 35, predeceasing his father by six years. His younger brother John later succeeded in the barony.

Parliament of the United Kingdom
Preceded by Nigel Kingscote; Samuel Marling	Member of Parliament for Gloucestershire West; 1874–1880; With: Nigel Kingscote	Succeeded by Nigel Kingscote; Lord Moreton
