= Henry Reynolds-Moreton, Lord Moreton =

British Liberal Party politician

Henry Haughton Reynolds-Moreton, Lord Moreton DL (4 March 1857 – 28 February 1920), was a British Liberal Party politician.

Moreton was the son of Henry Reynolds-Moreton, 3rd Earl of Ducie, and his wife Julia (née Langston). He entered Parliament for Gloucestershire West in the 1880 general election, a seat he held until 1885. He married Ada Margarette Smith on 18 December 1888 and had no issue.

He edited a glossary of old Gloucestershire words and phrases (published in 1890), to which he also contributed a list of dialect words from Tortworth, where he lived at Tortworth Court.

- Robertson, John Drummond (1890). Reynolds, Henry H. (ed.). A glossary of dialect & archaic words used in the County of Gloucester. London: Published for the English Dialect Society by Kegan Paul, Trench, Trübner.

Lord Moreton died in February 1920, aged 62, predeceasing his father by one year. His uncle Hon. Berkeley Basil Moreton later succeeded in the earldom.

Parliament of the United Kingdom
| Preceded by Nigel Kingscote; Hon. Randal Plunkett | Member of Parliament for Gloucestershire West; 1880–1885; With: Nigel Kingscote 1880–1885; Benjamin St John Ackers 1885 | Constituency abolished |
