= Representative Men =

Essays by Ralph Waldo Emerson

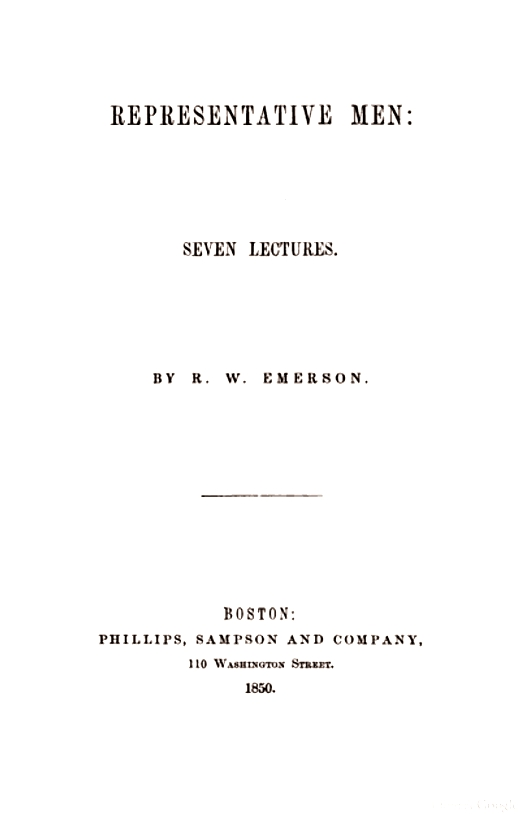
Representative Men (1850)

Representative Men is a collection of seven lectures by Ralph Waldo Emerson, published as a book of essays in 1850. The first essay discusses the role played by "great men" in society, and the remaining six each extol the virtues of one of six men deemed by Emerson to be great:

- Plato ("the Philosopher")
- Emanuel Swedenborg ("the Mystic")
- Michel de Montaigne ("the Skeptic")
- William Shakespeare ("the Poet")
- Napoleon ("the Man of the World")
- Johann Wolfgang von Goethe ("the Writer")

== See also ==
- On Heroes, Hero-Worship, & the Heroic in History – a similar series of lectures given by Thomas Carlyle, Emerson's Scottish contemporary
- Parallel Lives – classic work by Ancient Greek biographer Plutarch, outlining the lives of elite individuals and the virtues they represented.
