= Robert Blagden Hale =

English politician

Member of Parliament for West Gloucestershire
- In office 2 January 1836 – 31 March 1857 Serving with Nigel Kingscote (1852–1857); Grantley Berkeley (1836–1852)
- Preceded by: Grantley Berkeley; Marquess of Worcester
- Succeeded by: Nigel Kingscote; John Rolt

Personal details
- Born: 29 September 1807
- Died: 22 July 1883 (aged 75)
- Party: Conservative
- Spouse: Anne Jane Holford (m. 1832; died 1879)
- Children: Five
- Parent(s): Robert Hale Blagden Hale; Lady Theodosia Eleanor Bourke

Robert Blagden Hale (29 September 1807 – 22 July 1883) was a British Conservative politician.

Hale was the son of his namesake, Robert Hale Blagden Hale and Lady Theodosia Eleanor Bourke, daughter of Joseph Bourke, 3rd Earl of Mayo. He married Anne Jane, daughter of George Peter Holford, in 1832 and, before her death in 1879, they had five children: Anne Hale (1832–1895); Robert Hale (1834–1907); Matthew Holford Hale (born 1835); Theodosia Hale; and, Georgina Hale.

Hale was first elected Conservative MP for West Gloucestershire at a by-election in 1836—caused by the succession of Lord Worcester to the peerage as Duke of Beaufort—and held the seat until the 1857 general election when he did not seek re-election.

Outside of his political career, Hale was a Justice of the Peace and, in 1870, the High Sheriff of Gloucestershire.

== See also ==
- Alderley House

Parliament of the United Kingdom
Preceded by Grantley Berkeley; Marquess of Worcester	Member of Parliament for West Gloucestershire; 1836–1857; With: Nigel Kingscote (1852–1857); Grantley Berkeley (1836–1852)	Succeeded by Nigel Kingscote; John Rolt
