= Granger Boston =

English cricketer

Personal information
- Full name: Granger Farwell Boston
- Born: 24 May 1921; Liverpool, England
- Died: 4 February 1958 (aged 36); Marylebone, London, England
- Source: Cricinfo, 10 April 2017

Granger Farwell Boston (24 May 1921 – 4 February 1958) was an English cricketer and politician.

Boston was born in Liverpool. After serving in the Second World War from 1939 to 1943 (when he was invalided out), he read history at Clare College, Cambridge, graduating with a third in 1947. He played three first-class matches for Cambridge University Cricket Club in 1946. Upon graduation he lectured at the Royal Military Academy, Sandhurst, taught history at Clifton College and Oundle School, and was latterly a director of a tannery in Runcorn.

Boston was the Conservative Party candidate for Gloucestershire West in the 1950 general election and for Crewe in the 1955 general election. He killed himself with a shotgun at his London apartment in 1958.

== See also ==
- List of Cambridge University Cricket Club players
