= William Maginn =

19th-century Irish journalist and writer

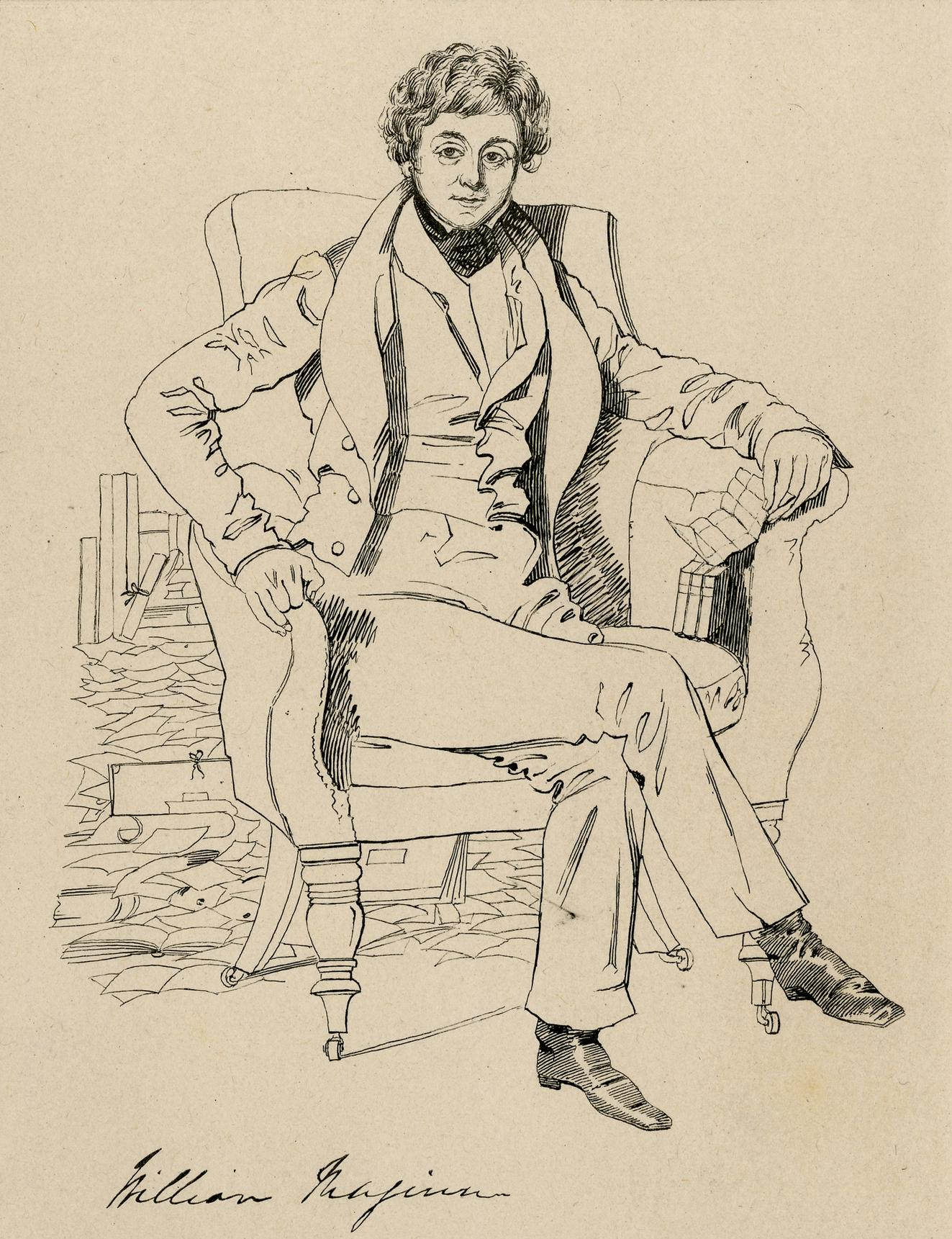
- Illustration from Fraser's Magazine, circa 1830s
- Born: 10 July 1794; Cork, Ireland
- Died: 21 August 1842 (aged 49); Walton-on-Thames, Surrey, England

William Maginn (10 July 1794 – 21 August 1842) was an Irish journalist and writer.

== About ==
Born at Cork he became a contributor to Blackwood's Magazine, and after moving to London in 1824 became for a few months in 1826 the Paris correspondent to The Representative, a paper started by John Murray, the publisher. When its short career was run, he helped to found in 1827 the ultra Tory Standard, a newspaper that he edited along with a fellow graduate of Trinity College, Dublin, Stanley Lees Giffard; he also wrote for the more scandalous Sunday paper, The Age. In 1830 he instigated and became one of the leading supporters of Fraser's Magazine, editing it under the pseudonym Oliver Yorke. His Homeric Ballads, much praised by contemporary critics, were published in Fraser's between 1839 and 1842. In 1837, Bentley's Miscellany was launched, with Charles Dickens as editor, and Maginn wrote the prologue and contributed over the next several years a series of "Shakespeare Papers" that examined characters in counter-intuitive fashion (e.g., the key to Falstaff is his melancholy). From "The Man in the Bell" (Blackwood's, 1821) through "Welch Rabbits" (Bentley's, 1842) he was an occasional though skilful writer of short fiction and tales. His only novel, Whitehall (1827) pretends to be an historical novel set in 1820s England written in the year 2227; it is a droll spoof of the vogue for historical novels as well as the contemporary political scene. He also wrote The Military Sketch-Book: Reminiscences of Seventeen Years Service Abroad and At Home, "By An Officer of the Line" (anonymously) published in two volumes by Henry Colburn in 1827. Partly set in Australia and involving the capture of a notorious gang of Bushrangers. In 1836, he fought a duel with Grantley Berkeley, a member of Parliament. Three rounds of shots were fired, but no one was struck. Berkeley had brutally assaulted magazine publisher James Fraser over a review Maginn wrote of Berkeley's novel Berkeley Castle, and Maginn had called him out.

One of the most brilliant periodical writers of his time, Maginn left little permanent work behind him. In his later years, 1842, his intemperate habits landed him in debtor's prison, and when he emerged through the grace of the Insolvent Debtor's Act he was in an advanced stage of tuberculosis. He wrote until the end, including in the first volume of Punch, but he died in extreme poverty in Walton-on-Thames in August 1842, survived by his wife Ellen, and daughters Annie and Ellen, and son John. His nephew Francis Maginn, who was deaf, was a co-founder of the British Deaf and Dumb Association, now called the British Deaf Association (BDA).
