= Charles Loughlin =

British politician (1914–1993)

Charles William Loughlin (16 February 1914 – 23 September 1993) was a British Labour Party politician.

Born in Grimsby, Loughlin was educated at St Mary's School. In 1945, he began working for the Union of Shop, Distributive and Allied Workers as an area organiser, holding the post until 1974.

He was Member of Parliament for West Gloucestershire from 1959 until he stood down at the October 1974 general election. He was Parliamentary Secretary to the Ministry of Health from 1965 to 1967, Parliamentary Secretary to the Ministry of Social Security from 1967 to 1968 and Parliamentary Secretary to the Ministry of Public Building and Works from 1968 to 1970.

Gerald Kaufman claimed that Prime Minister Harold Wilson had planned to sack Loughlin, but declined to do on hearing about the death of his daughter in a car crash.

Parliament of the United Kingdom
Preceded by M. Philips Price	Member of Parliament for West Gloucestershire; 1959 – October 1974	Succeeded by John Watkinson
