= M. Philips Price =

British politician (1885-1973)

Morgan Philips Price (29 January 1885 – 23 September 1973) was a British politician and a Labour Party Member of Parliament (MP).

He was born in Gloucester. His father, William Edwin Price, was also a British MP, serving for the seat of Tewkesbury.

Price was schooled at Harrow and Trinity College, Cambridge. When his father died in 1886, Price, then one year old, inherited an estate of some 2,000 acres (8.1 km^{2}).

== Journalism ==
His political life began as a member of the Liberal Party, and he was selected as a prospective party candidate for Gloucester (1911–14). However, he took an antiwar stance at the outbreak of the First World War, joining the Union of Democratic Control at its inception. In 1912, he published a volume of travel writing on Siberia, concentrating on social and economic prospects for the region, where he spent most of 1909 and 1910 researching and travelling. In 1914, he also published "The Diplomatic History of the War".

He was then recruited by C.P. Scott of the Manchester Guardian and became a war correspondent for the Eastern Front. As a Russian speaker, he could observe and report on the Russian Revolution. In 1921, he returned to Britain and published My Reminiscences of the Russian Revolution, which showed sympathy to the government of Vladimir Lenin and to the Bolsheviks.

Price was employed by the Daily Herald as a correspondent in Germany from 1919 to 1923.

== Parliament ==
After the First World War, Price joined the Labour Party and became its candidate for the Gloucester seat. He fought the seat at the general elections in 1922, 1923 and 1924 but was unsuccessful. At the 1929 general election, he was finally elected to Parliament for the Whitehaven constituency. He joined Ramsay MacDonald's government when appointed as Private Secretary to Charles Trevelyan, president of the Board of Education.

At the 1931 general election, Price lost his seat. However, he returned to Parliament in 1935, as member for the Forest of Dean, which he served until the constituency was abolished in boundary changes for the 1950 general election. He was elected instead for the new West Gloucestershire constituency, and held that seat until he retired from the House of Commons at the 1959 general election.

In 1969, Price published his memoirs, My Three Revolutions. He died on 23 September 1973, at 88.

== See also ==
- Dzungarian Gate

Parliament of the United Kingdom
Preceded by Robert Hudson	Member of Parliament for Whitehaven; 1929 – 1931	Succeeded by William Nunn
Preceded by John Worthington	Member of Parliament for Forest of Dean; 1935 – 1950	Constituency abolished
New constituency	Member of Parliament for West Gloucestershire; 1950 – 1959	Succeeded by Charles Loughlin
