= Aida Foster Theatre School =

Performing arts school in London, England

Coordinates: 51°34′22″N 0°11′44″W

The Aida Foster Theatre School for drama, dance and education was founded by Aida Foster in 1929 as a hobby to teach dancing. It expanded over the years to become one of Britain's foremost stage schools.

Many stage and film personalities of the 20th century received their professional education and arranged their first employment through the school. Run by Aida, and later by her daughter Anita Foster, it catered for three different groups of students: those that undertook dance training only, younger pupils that had full education plus both dancing and drama training, and older students taking drama training only.

The Aida Foster School supplied many of the pantomime "babes" (children's choruses and parts) for the West End Christmas shows of the 1950s. They also obtained modelling contracts for many of the juveniles.

Foster had started a theatrical agency associated with the school in 1944. Following the death of her husband she closed the school in 1970 to concentrate on the agency with her daughter Anita.

The school was situated on Finchley Road in Golders Green, north London, just north of the junction with Golders Green Road.

== Alumni ==
Notable alumni include:

- film actress Jean Simmons
- Carry On actress Barbara Windsor
- actress Kate O'Mara
- actress Vicki Michelle
- actress Shirley Eaton
- singer and actress Elaine Paige
- singer and actress Marti Webb (who became Head Girl)
- actress Dilys Laye
- actress Moiya Kelly
- artist Sara Leighton
- actress Perlita Neilson
- child actor and musician Paul Layton
- actor Robin Davies
- actresses Linda and Jane Hayden
- businesswoman Caroline Marland
