= Benjamin St John Ackers =

British politician

Benjamin St John Ackers (6 November 1839 – 18 April 1915) was a British Conservative Party politician. He sat in the House of Commons in 1885.

At the 1880 general election he stood unsuccessfully in the borough of Gloucester. A petition was lodged against the election of the two Liberal Party candidates, which led to one of the two returns being voided. However, the writ was suspended, and no by-election was held.

In 1885, a vacancy arose in the Western division of Gloucestershire, when the Liberal MP Nigel Kingscote was appointed as Commissioners of Woods, Forests and Land Revenues. Ackers was selected as the Conservative candidate for the resulting by-election, which was held on 12 March 1885. He won the seat with a majority of 411 votes (4.4% of the total) over his Liberal opponent.

Constituencies were radically revised by the Redistribution of Seats Act 1885, and at the general election in November 1885 Ackers contested the new Thornbury division. He was defeated by a margin of 145 votes by the Liberal Stafford Howard.

Ackers was appointed a deputy lieutenant of Gloucestershire in 1903.

Parliament of the United Kingdom
Preceded by Nigel Kingscote; Lord Moreton	Member of Parliament for West Gloucestershire; March 1885 – November 1885; With: Lord Moreton	Constituency abolished
