= John Watkinson =

British politician (1941–2004)

John Taylor Watkinson (25 January 1941 – 21 September 2004) was a British Labour Party politician, barrister and teacher.

He was educated at Bristol Grammar School before reading PPE at Worcester College, Oxford. From graduation until 1971 he was a schoolmaster at Rugby, and thereafter was called to the bar, where he practised on the Midland Circuit.

Watkinson was elected as the Member of Parliament (MP) for Gloucestershire West in the October 1974 general election, but lost the seat in 1979 to the Conservative Paul Marland.

Watkinson was on the moderate 'right' wing of the Labour Party, but was relatively unusual for a member of that tendency in voting for Britain's withdrawal from the European Economic Community (EEC) during the referendum on membership in 1975. He defected to the Social Democratic Party (SDP) in October 1981, and contested Gloucestershire West under his new colours in 1983 and 1987.

Parliament of the United Kingdom
Preceded by Charles Loughlin	Member of Parliament for Gloucestershire West; October 1974–1979	Succeeded by Paul Marland
