= West Gloucestershire =

Parliamentary constituency in the United Kingdom, 1950–1997

- Former county constituency for the House of Commons
- West Gloucestershire, showing boundaries used from 1983-1997
- County: Gloucestershire

1950–1997
- Seats: One
- Created from: Forest of Dean and Stroud
- Replaced by: Forest of Dean, Tewkesbury

1832–1885
- Seats: Two
- Type of constituency: County constituency
- Created from: Gloucestershire
- Replaced by: Forest of Dean; Thornbury

West Gloucestershire was a parliamentary constituency in Gloucestershire, represented in the House of Commons of the Parliament of the United Kingdom.

It was first created by the Great Reform Act for the 1832 general election as a 2-seat constituency (i.e. electing two Members of Parliament). It was abolished for the 1885 general election.

Its namesake, a seat of about half the physical size of the above, took up a north-west side of the Severn estuary similar to the Forest of Dean, and came into being for the 1950 general election. It was abolished for the 1997 general election.

== History ==
The 1950 to 1997 single-member constituency was held by the Labour Party from its creation in 1950 until 1979 and then held by the Conservative Party until its abolition.

== Boundaries ==
=== 1832 to 1885 ===
Context: 1832-1868. Extract from 1837 result: the western, striped areas straddling the Severn estuary.

1832–1885: The Hundreds of Berkeley, Thornbury, Langley and Swineshead, Grumbald's Ash, Pucklechurch, Lancaster Duchy, Botloe, St Briavel's, Westbury, and Bledisloe, and the parts of the Hundreds of Henbury and Barton Regis that are not included in the limits of the City of Bristol.

The place of election was the small town of Dursley. This was where the hustings were put up and electors voted (by spoken declaration in public, before the secret ballot was introduced in 1872).

The qualification to vote in county elections, in the period, was to be a forty-shilling freeholder.

The county's five parliamentary boroughs were all in East Gloucestershire. Qualified freeholders from those boroughs could vote in the eastern county division. Bristol was a "county of itself", so its freeholders qualified to vote in the borough, not in a county division.

There were no electors qualified to vote in the western division, because they were freehold owners of land in a parliamentary borough.

=== 1950 to 1997 ===
1950–1983: The Rural Districts of East Dean, Lydney, Newent, and West Dean, and part of the Rural District of Gloucester.

1983–1997: The District of Forest of Dean, and the Borough of Tewkesbury wards of Brockworth Glebe, Brockworth Moorfield, Brockworth Westfield, Churchdown Brookfield, Churchdown Parton, Churchdown Pirton, De Winton, Haw Bridge, Highnam, Horsbere, and Innsworth.

The constituency in this period was a smaller part of the county of Gloucestershire than its nineteenth century namesake. It was centred on the Forest of Dean, and indeed the majority of the constituency at abolition formed the new Forest of Dean constituency. About a fifth of the constituency moved to Tewkesbury, with 735 constituents moving to Gloucester.

== Members of Parliament ==
=== MPs 1832–1885 ===
Election	First member	First party	Second member	Second party
1832	Hon. Grantley Berkeley	Whig	Hon. Augustus Moreton	Whig
1835	Hon. Grantley Berkeley	Whig	Marquess of Worcester	Conservative
1836 by-election	Hon. Grantley Berkeley	Whig	Robert Blagden Hale	Conservative
1852	Nigel Kingscote	Whig	Robert Blagden Hale	Conservative
1857	Nigel Kingscote	Whig	Sir John Rolt	Conservative
1859	Nigel Kingscote	Liberal	Sir John Rolt	Conservative
1867 by-election	Nigel Kingscote	Liberal	Edward Arthur Somerset	Conservative
1868	Nigel Kingscote	Liberal	Samuel Marling	Liberal
1874	Nigel Kingscote	Liberal	Hon. Randal Plunkett	Conservative
1880	Nigel Kingscote	Liberal	Lord Moreton	Liberal
1885 by-election	Benjamin St John Ackers	Conservative	Lord Moreton	Liberal
1885	constituency abolished			

=== MPs 1950–1997 ===
Election	Member	Party
1950	M. Philips Price	Labour
1959	Charles Loughlin	Labour
Oct 1974	John Watkinson	Labour
1979	Paul Marland	Conservative
1997	constituency abolished: see Forest of Dean and Tewkesbury	

== Election results ==
=== Election in the 1990s ===
General election 1992: Gloucestershire West
Party	Candidate	Votes	%	±%
Conservative	Paul Marland	29,232	43.6	–2.6
Labour	Diana Organ	24,274	36.2	+8.2
Liberal Democrats	J. E. Boait	13,366	19.9	–6.0
British Independent	A. Reeve	172	0.3	New
Twenty First Century	C. R. Palmer	75	0.1	New
Majority		4,958	7.4	–10.7
Turnout		67,119	83.9	+2.5
Registered electors		80,007		+2.5
Conservative hold		Swing	–5.4	

=== Elections in the 1980s ===
General election 1987: West Gloucestershire
Party	Candidate	Votes	%	±%
Conservative	Paul Marland	29,257	46.1	+0.3
Labour	Peter Sandland-Nielsen	17,758	28.0	+3.3
SDP	John Watkinson	16,440	25.9	–3.6
Majority		11,499	18.1	+1.8
Turnout		63,455	81.4	+1.8
Registered electors		77,994		+4.8
Conservative hold		Swing	–1.5	

General election 1983: West Gloucestershire
Party	Candidate	Votes	%	±%
Conservative	Paul Marland	27,092	45.8	–2.1
SDP	John Watkinson	17,440	29.5	+18.7
Labour	Michael Hodkinson	14,572	24.7	–16.2
Majority		9,652	16.3	+9.2
Turnout		59,104	79.6	–4.3
Registered electors		74,266		+5.6
Conservative hold		Swing	–10.4	

=== Elections in the 1970s ===
General election 1979: West Gloucestershire
Party	Candidate	Votes	%	±%
Conservative	Paul Marland	28,183	47.9	+7.0
Labour	John Watkinson	24,009	40.8	–0.9
Liberal	Margaret Joachim	6,370	10.8	–6.5
National Front	G. Storkey	270	0.5	New
Majority		4,174	7.1	N/A
Turnout		58,832	83.9	+3.8
Registered electors		70,104		+4.1
Conservative gain from Labour		Swing	+3.9	

General election October 1974: West Gloucestershire
Party	Candidate	Votes	%	±%
Labour	John Watkinson	22,481	41.7	+1.0
Conservative	Paul Marland	22,072	40.9	+3.1
Liberal	A. L. MacGregor	9,353	17.4	–3.8
Majority		409	0.8	–2.1
Turnout		53,906	80.2	–3.7
Registered electors		67,239		+0.8
Labour hold		Swing	–1.1	

General election February 1974: Gloucestershire West
Party	Candidate	Votes	%	±%
Labour	Charles Loughlin	22,765	40.7	–5.3
Conservative	Paul Marland	21,141	37.8	–6.2
Liberal	A. L. MacGregor	11,856	21.2	+11.3
Independent	S. S. Hart	171	0.3	New
Majority		1,624	2.9	+0.7
Turnout		55,933	83.9	+7.2
Registered electors		66,706		+3.5
Labour hold		Swing	+0.4	

1970 notional result
Party	Vote	%
Labour	22,700	46.0
Conservative	21,700	44.0
Liberal	4,900	9.9
Turnout	49,300	76.6
Electorate	64,354	

General election 1970: Gloucestershire West
Party	Candidate	Votes	%	±%
Labour	Charles Loughlin	22,637	46.1	–5.7
Conservative	Stanley Hopkins	21,530	43.9	+9.4
Liberal	J. Alan Svendsen	4,932	10.0	–3.7
Majority		1,107	2.2	–15.1
Turnout		49,099	77.2	–0.8
Registered electors		63,599		+10.7
Labour hold		Swing	–7.5	

=== Elections in the 1960s ===
General election 1966: Gloucestershire West
Party	Candidate	Votes	%	±%
Labour	Charles Loughlin	23,181	51.8	+1.9
Conservative	Stanley Hopkins	15,476	34.5	+0.4
Liberal	Kenneth Harvey	6,137	13.7	–2.3
Majority		7,705	17.3	+1.5
Turnout		44,794	78.0	–1.6
Registered electors		57,443		+1.8
Labour hold		Swing	+0.7	

General election 1964: Gloucestershire West
Party	Candidate	Votes	%	±%
Labour	Charles Loughlin	22,420	49.9	+0.5
Conservative	Douglas St P. Barnard	15,300	34.1	–3.0
Liberal	Richard Cook	7,191	16.0	+2.5
Majority		7,120	15.8	+3.5
Turnout		44,911	79.6	–1.2
Registered electors		56,407		+4.1
Labour hold		Swing	+1.7	

=== Elections in the 1950s ===
General election 1959: Gloucestershire West
Party	Candidate	Votes	%	±%
Labour	Charles Loughlin	21,634	49.4	–5.5
Conservative	Olive K. L. Lloyd-Baker	16,223	37.1	–8.0
Liberal	Eric Radley	5,921	13.5	New
Majority		5,411	12.3	+2.5
Turnout		43,778	80.8	+2.2
Registered electors		54,202		+4.7
Labour hold		Swing	+1.2	

General election 1955: Gloucestershire West
Party	Candidate	Votes	%	±%
Labour	M. Philips Price	22,366	54.9	–3.0
Conservative	Bryan J. Y. Williams	18,346	45.1	+3.0
Majority		4,020	9.9	–6.0
Turnout		40,712	78.6	–3.7
Registered electors		51,772		+1.5
Labour hold		Swing	–3.0	

General election 1951: Gloucestershire West
Party	Candidate	Votes	%	±%
Labour	M. Philips Price	24,334	57.9	+3.2
Conservative	Arthur Russell	17,665	42.1	+9.2
Majority		6,669	15.9	–6.0
Turnout		41,999	82.3	+0.1
Registered electors		51,020		+0.1
Labour hold		Swing	–3.0	

General election 1950: Gloucestershire West
Party	Candidate	Votes	%
Labour	M. Philips Price	22,765	54.8
Conservative	Granger Boston	13,664	32.9
Liberal	Basil Houldsworth	5,125	12.3
Majority		9,101	21.9
Turnout		41,554	82.3
Registered electors		50,513	
Labour win (new seat)			

=== Elections in the 1880s ===
By-election, 12 Mar 1885: West Gloucestershire (1 seat vacant)
Party	Candidate	Votes	%	±%
Conservative	Benjamin St John Ackers	4,837	52.2	+21.5
Liberal	William Marling	4,426	47.8	−21.6
Majority		411	4.4	N/A
Turnout		9,263	72.4	−9.5 (est)
Registered electors		12,802		
Conservative gain from Liberal		Swing	+21.6	

- Caused by Kingscote's appointment as Commissioner of Woods, Forests and Land Revenues.

General election 1880: West Gloucestershire (2 seats)
Party	Candidate	Votes	%	±%
Liberal	Nigel Kingscote	5,316	35.2	+2.3
Liberal	Lord Moreton	5,164	34.2	+1.5
Conservative	Randal Plunkett	4,640	30.7	−3.8
Majority		524	3.5	N/A
Turnout		9,956 (est)	81.9 (est)	+5.5
Registered electors		12,162		
Liberal hold		Swing	+2.1	
Liberal gain from Conservative		Swing	+1.7	

=== Elections in the 1870s ===
General election 1874: West Gloucestershire (2 seats)
Party	Candidate	Votes	%	±%
Conservative	Randal Plunkett	4,553	34.5	+3.6
Liberal	Nigel Kingscote	4,344	32.9	−2.1
Liberal	Charles Berkeley	4,317	32.7	−1.4
Majority		236	1.8	N/A
Turnout		8,884 (est)	76.4 (est)	−4.9
Registered electors		11,632		
Conservative gain from Liberal		Swing	+1.6	
Liberal hold		Swing	−2.0	

=== Elections in the 1860s ===
General election 1868: West Gloucestershire (2 seats)
Party	Candidate	Votes	%	±%
Liberal	Nigel Kingscote	4,985	35.0	N/A
Liberal	Samuel Marling	4,862	34.1	N/A
Conservative	Edward Arthur Somerset	4,394	30.9	N/A
Majority		468	3.2	N/A
Turnout		9,318 (est)	81.3 (est)	N/A
Registered electors		11,463		
Liberal hold				
Liberal gain from Conservative				

By-election, 25 July 1867: West Gloucestershire (1 seat)
Party	Candidate	Votes	%	±%
Conservative	Edward Arthur Somerset	3,649	50.7	N/A
Liberal	Charles Berkeley	3,553	49.3	N/A
Majority		96	1.4	N/A
Turnout		7,202	76.9	N/A
Registered electors		9,368		
Conservative hold				

- Caused by Rolt's appointment as a judge of the Court of Appeal in Chancery

By-election, 15 November 1866: West Gloucestershire (1 seat)
Party	Candidate	Votes	%	±%
Conservative	John Rolt	Unopposed		
Conservative hold				

- Caused by Rolt's appointment as Attorney General for England and Wales.

General election 1865: West Gloucestershire (2 seats)
Party	Candidate	Votes	%	±%
Conservative	John Rolt	Unopposed		
Liberal	Nigel Kingscote	Unopposed		
Registered electors		9,368		
Conservative hold				
Liberal hold				

=== Elections in the 1850s ===
By-election, 7 July 1859: West Gloucestershire
Party	Candidate	Votes	%	±%
Liberal	Nigel Kingscote	Unopposed		
Liberal hold				

- Appointment of Kingscote as a Groom in Waiting to Her Majesty Queen Victoria

General election 1859: West Gloucestershire (2 seats)
Party	Candidate	Votes	%	±%
Liberal	Nigel Kingscote	Unopposed		
Conservative	John Rolt	Unopposed		
Registered electors		9,167		
Liberal hold				
Conservative hold				

General election 1857: West Gloucestershire (2 seats)
Party	Candidate	Votes	%	±%
Whig	Nigel Kingscote	Unopposed		
Conservative	John Rolt	Unopposed		
Registered electors		9,250		
Whig hold				
Conservative hold				

General election 1852: West Gloucestershire (2 seats)
Party	Candidate	Votes	%	±%
Whig	Nigel Kingscote	3,528	40.8	+17.5
Conservative	Robert Blagden Hale	2,946	34.1	−12.5
Whig	Grantley Berkeley	2,166	25.1	−5.0
Turnout		6,474 (est)	75.0 (est)	−12.8
Registered electors		8,635		
Majority		582	6.7	N/A
Whig hold		Swing	+11.9	
Majority		780	9.0	−7.5
Conservative hold		Swing	−12.5	

=== Elections in the 1840s ===
General election 1847: West Gloucestershire (2 seats)
Party	Candidate	Votes	%	±%
Conservative	Robert Blagden Hale	4,240	46.6	N/A
Whig	Grantley Berkeley	2,744	30.1	N/A
Whig	Grenville Berkeley	2,123	23.3	N/A
Majority		1,496	16.5	N/A
Turnout		6,674 (est)	87.8 (est)	N/A
Registered electors		7,601		
Conservative hold		Swing	N/A	
Whig hold		Swing	N/A	

General election 1841: West Gloucestershire (2 seats)
Party	Candidate	Votes	%	±%
Whig	Grantley Berkeley	Unopposed		
Conservative	Robert Blagden Hale	Unopposed		
Registered electors		7,875		
Whig hold				
Conservative hold				

=== Elections in the 1830s ===
General election 1837: West Gloucestershire (2 seats)
Party	Candidate	Votes	%	±%
Whig	Grantley Berkeley	Unopposed		
Conservative	Robert Blagden Hale	Unopposed		
Registered electors		6,936		
Whig hold				
Conservative hold				

By-election, 2 January 1836: West Gloucestershire
Party	Candidate	Votes	%	±%
Conservative	Robert Blagden Hale	Unopposed		
Conservative hold				

- Succession of Worcester to the peerage as 7th Duke of Beaufort

General election 1835: West Gloucestershire (2 seats)
Party	Candidate	Votes	%	±%
Whig	Grantley Berkeley	Unopposed		
Conservative	Marquess of Worcester	Unopposed		
Registered electors		6,473		
Whig hold				
Conservative gain from Whig				

General election 1832: West Gloucestershire (2 seats)
Party	Candidate	Votes	%
Whig	Grantley Berkeley	3,153	34.6
Whig	Augustus Moreton	2,996	32.9
Tory	Lord Robert Somerset	2,962	32.5
Majority		34	0.4
Turnout		5,943	91.1
Registered electors		6,521	
Whig win (new seat)			
Whig win (new seat)			

== See also ==
- List of parliamentary constituencies in Gloucestershire

== Sources ==
- British Parliamentary Election Results 1832-1885, compiled and edited by F. W. S. Craig (Macmillan Press 1977)
- The Parliaments of England by Henry Stooks Smith (1st edition published in three volumes 1844–50), second edition edited (in one volume) by F. W. S. Craig (Political Reference Publications 1973))
- Who's Who of British Members of Parliament: Volume I 1832-1885, edited by M. Stenton (The Harvester Press 1976)
