= George Culley =

British agriculturist

George Culley (baptised 1735 – 1813) was an English agriculturist.

== Life ==
The younger son of Matthew Culley, in early life he concentrated on agriculture, and in particular cattle breeding. He was the first pupil of Robert Bakewell, and with his brother Matthew gained an international reputation.

"The Culley breed" at the time referred to sheep, a cross of Bakewell's Leicester breed rams with Teeswater ewes. Visitors came to the Culley farm at Fenton, near Wooler, Northumberland, to see innovations in drainage and crop rotation.

Culley published works on agriculture, mostly with John Bailey, and was in correspondence with Arthur Young. He died, after a short illness, at Fowberry Tower, Northumberland, on 7 May 1813.
