= Robert Lawrence (British Army officer) =

British Army officer (born 1960)

Robert Alasdair Davidson Lawrence MC (born 3 July 1960) is a former British Army officer who was severely wounded while fighting in the Falklands War in 1982. He documented his experiences during and after the conflict in a book, co-written with his father, John Lawrence, entitled When the Fighting Is Over: A Personal Story of the Battle for Tumbledown Mountain and Its Aftermath. This was adapted into the controversial BBC television play Tumbledown in 1988.

== Early life and career ==
Lawrence was born on 3 July 1960. His father had served in the Royal Air Force. Lawrence was educated at Rose Hill School, Alderley and then Fettes College, but left at the age of 16; some accounts state that he was expelled. He decided to join the army, largely to placate his father. After attending Royal Military Academy Sandhurst, he was commissioned into the Scots Guards as a second lieutenant with a short service commission on 4 August 1979. He was promoted to lieutenant on 4 August 1981.

Second Battalion, Scots Guards were part of the second wave of British land forces committed to the Falklands War.

Lawrence wrote about his experience in the Scots Guards at the Battle of Mount Tumbledown when, in his moment of victory on the eastern slopes, he was almost killed when a bullet fired by an Argentine sniper tore off the side of his head. He was awarded the Military Cross for bravery, but he spent a year in a wheelchair and was almost totally paralyzed. The Argentinian sniper (either Private Luis Jorge Bordón or Walter Ignacio Becerra, according to Argentine Second Lieutenant Augusto Esteban La Madrid who clashed with Lawrence's platoon), armed with a FAL rifle, had helped cover the Argentinean retreat, firing shots at a Scout helicopter evacuating wounded off Tumbledown and injuring two men, before the Scots Guards mortally wounded him in a hail of gunfire.

Lawrence's wound was caused by a 7.62×51mm round passing through the rear of his skull, to emerge at his hairline above his right eye. He lay on the thin cover of snow on the exposed mountaintop for six hours. Airlifted off Tumbledown, Lawrence was left outside a makeshift operating theatre without painkillers. Two weeks from his 22nd birthday on 14 June, he assumed he was the last to be operated on because he was the least likely to survive causing him to wait 8 hours at the back of the operating queue.

== Aftermath ==
Lawrence lost 42% of his brain and was paralysed down the left-hand side of his body. He was awarded the Military Cross on 11 October 1982. He was discharged from the army on 14 November 1983. He spent a year in a wheelchair and doctors predicted he would never walk again. He eventually regained most movement although with a slight limp, a paralysed left arm, involuntary muscle contractions and posttraumatic stress disorder.

His story was adapted into the BBC television drama film Tumbledown written by Charles Wood, directed by Richard Eyre and starring Colin Firth as Lawrence, which was viewed by more than 10 million people on its first showing.

Lawrence married and emigrated to Australia where he worked in the film industry. He subsequently divorced, returned to England and remarried. He was interviewed by several British newspapers on the 25th anniversary of the Falklands War. He has since established Global Adventure Plus, a project to help rehabilitate British ex-servicemen through expeditions to foreign countries.

In June 2022, Lawrence was featured in the documentary Our Falklands War: A Frontline Story that was shown on BBC2; where he recalls in detail the events that nearly cost him his life during the Battle of Mount Tumbledown.
