= Fraser's Magazine =

Literary magazine

- Editor: James Fraser (founder)
- Categories: Literature, politics, culture
- Frequency: Monthly
- Format: Print
- Publisher: James Fraser
- Founded: 1830
- First issue: 1830
- Final issue: 1882
- Country: United Kingdom
- Based in: London
- Language: English

Fraser's Magazine for Town and Country was a general and literary journal published in London from 1830 to 1882, which initially took a strong Tory line in politics. It was founded by Hugh Fraser and William Maginn in 1830 and loosely directed by Maginn (and later Francis Mahony) under the name Oliver Yorke, until about 1840. It circulated until 1882, when it was renamed Longman's Magazine.

== Editors ==
In its early years, the publisher James Fraser (no relation to Hugh) played a role in soliciting contributors and preparing the magazine for the press. After James Fraser's death in 1841 the magazine was acquired by George William Nickisson, and in 1847 by John William Parker. In 1863, Thomas and William Longman took over all of Parker's business. Its last notable editor was James Anthony Froude (1860–1874). In 1882, Fraser's Magazine was renamed Longman's Magazine, and was popularised and reduced in cost to sixpence.

== Contributors ==
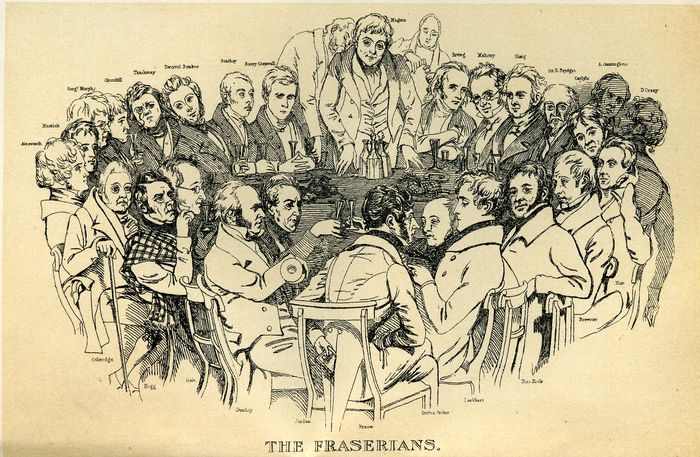
The Fraserians, 1835 group portrait by Daniel Maclise

Among the contributors were Thomas Carlyle, William Makepeace Thackeray, Frances Power Cobbe, Thomas Medwin, James Hogg, William Mudford, Janet Ross and John Stuart Mill. The 1835 group portrait by Maclise misleads in that David Brewster, Samuel Taylor Coleridge, John Gibson Lockhart and Robert Southey, while included, were not substantial contributors. Others who were active at that period were Percival Banks, T. C. Croker, John Galt, John Abraham Heraud, E. V. Kenealy, David Macbeth Moir, Francis Mahony, Robert Willmott and Thomas Wright. Another contributor was William Jardine Smith.
