= John William Parker =

English publisher and printer

John William Parker (1791 – 1870) was an English publisher and printer.

== Life ==
John Parker was born on 26 July 1791. His father was in the Royal Navy. At the age of fourteen he was apprenticed to William Clowes, and became the manager of the printing business in Duke Street, Stamford Street, Blackfriars Road, London, established in Applegarth's old premises by Clowes. He was later allowed to set up a small office of his own.

In February 1829 Parker was engaged, on Clowes's recommendation, as superintendent of the Cambridge University Press, which he made profitable. In 1832 he left Clowes, and established himself at 445 Strand, where he was appointed publisher to the Christian Knowledge Society, and issued the Saturday Magazine. The Cambridge Repository, his publishing house, also sold bibles. On the retirement of John Smith, he was formally made printer to the University of Cambridge, on 15 November 1836, and spent two days in Cambridge every fortnight. Against opposition he introduced steam power, but the Bible Society long declined to purchase books printed by it.

A volume of specimens of bibles, testaments and prayer books was circulated by Parker in 1839. In the same year he was appointed publisher to the committee of Council on Education. He retired from the management of the Cambridge press in 1854. He was a friend and supporter of John Pyke Hullah. He started a printing-office at the back of the Mews, Charing Cross, and later moved to St. Martin's Lane, where he took Thomas Richard Harrison into partnership, and ultimately relinquished the business to him. Fraser's Magazine was published by him, as well as the writings of prominent intellectual figures.

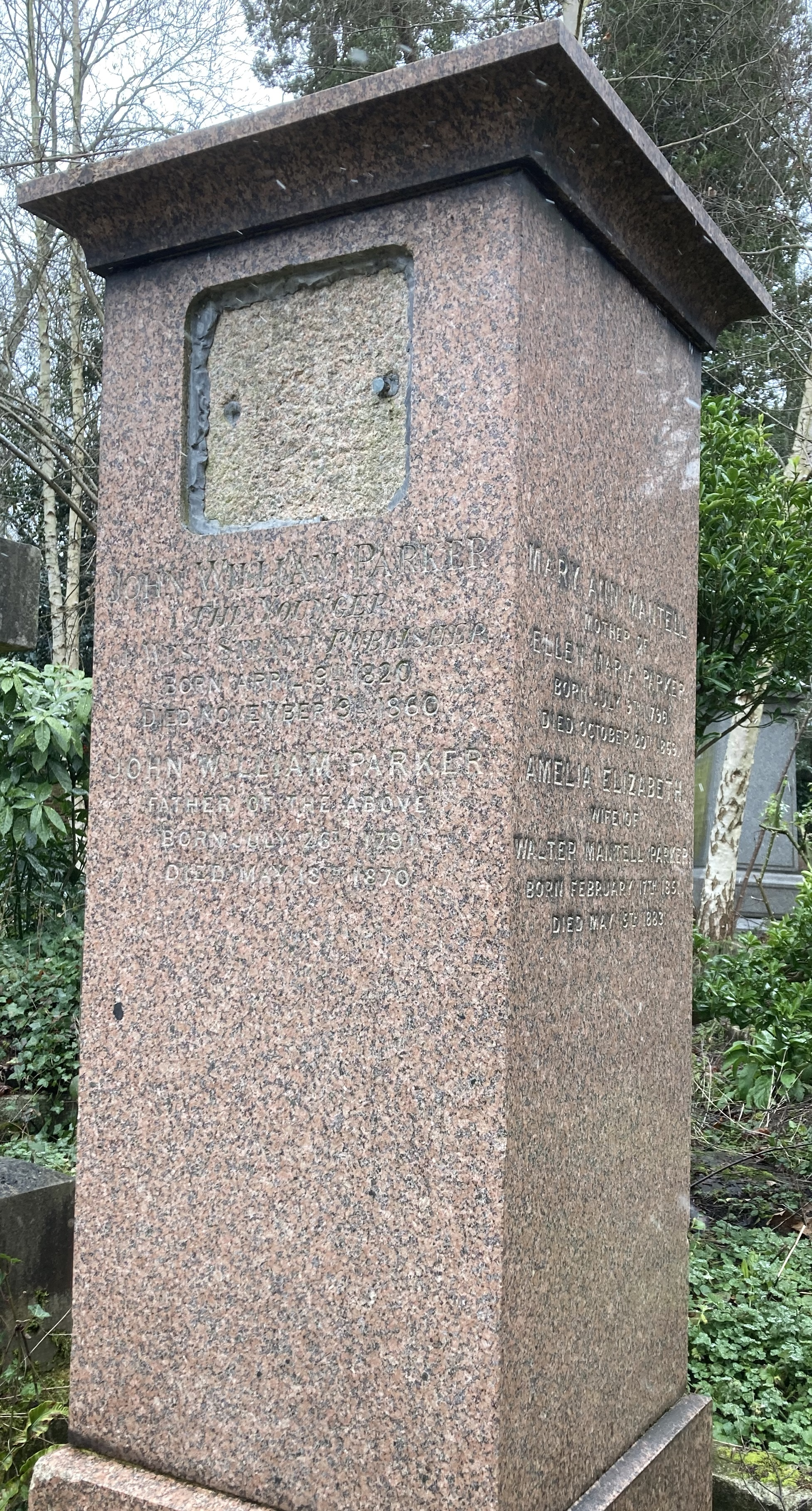
Parker family monument in Highgate Cemetery

After the death in 1860 of his eldest son John William Parker (1820–1860), who had been in the business since 1843, Parker took into partnership William Butler Bourn, who had been his principal assistant for nearly thirty years. The business, including stocks and copyrights, was, however, sold in 1863 to Messrs. Longman.

Parker died at Warren Corner House, near Farnham, Surrey, on 18 May 1870, aged 78, and is buried at Highgate Cemetery.

== Family ==
Parker was twice married. By his first wife he left two daughters. His second wife, who survived him, was a daughter of Gideon Algernon Mantell; by her he left one son and two daughters.

== Notes ==
Attribution

This article incorporates text from a publication now in the public domain: Lee, Sidney, ed. (1895). "Parker, John William". Dictionary of National Biography. Vol. 43. London: Smith, Elder & Co.
