= Paul Marland =

British politician (1940–2021)

Member of Parliament for West Gloucestershire
- In office 3 June 1979 – 8 April 1997
- Preceded by: John Watkinson
- Succeeded by: Constituency abolished

Personal details
- Born: 19 March 1940
- Died: 7 April 2021 (aged 81)
- Party: Conservative
- Spouse(s): Penelope Barlow (m. 1965; div. 1982) Caroline Rushton (m. 1984)
- Children: 3
- Education: Trinity College, Dublin

Paul Marland (19 March 1940 – 7 April 2021) was a British Conservative politician who was a Member of Parliament (MP) for West Gloucestershire from 1979 to 1997. From 1967 onwards, he was also a farmer.

== Early life and education ==
Marland was born in March 1940, during the Second World War, the son of Alexander G. Marland and Elsa May Lindsey Marland. He was educated at Gordonstoun School in Elgin, and Trinity College, Dublin, where he received BA (Bachelor of Arts) and BComm (Bachelor of Commerce) degrees.

== Career ==
Marland worked for Hopes Metal Windows in 1964, followed by a spell at the London Press Exchange from 1965 to 1966.

In 1970, he contested the safe Labour seat of Bedwellty in Wales. At the February and October 1974 elections, Marland fought the marginal seat of West Gloucestershire, but lost. He became a Member of Parliament on his fourth attempt, gaining the seat from Labour in 1979, at an election which saw his party return to power nationally. He was the first Conservative MP for the seat, it having been represented by Labour since the seat's creation in 1950.

In Parliament, he was joint Parliamentary Private Secretary to the Financial Secretary to the Treasury and the Economic Secretary to the Treasury, from 1981 to 1983. Marland became Minister of Agriculture, Fisheries and Food in 1983, a role he held until 1986. From 1989 to 1997, he was Chairman of the backbench Agricultural Committee.

He served as an MP until 1997, when his seat was abolished by boundary changes; as a result he stood in the new Forest of Dean constituency, but lost to Labour's Diana Organ. He stood as a Conservative candidate for South West England at the European Parliament elections in 1999, but was last on the party list of seven candidates, and thus not elected.

He was Vice-President of the National Conservative Convention from 2002 to 2005. In 2005, he became the NCC's President, and therefore hosted the 2005 Conservative Party Conference. He was also a Member of the Board for the Conservative Party from 2002 to 2005.

== Personal life and death ==
Marland married twice. His first marriage, in 1965, was to Penelope Anne Barlow; the couple had a son and two daughters. The marriage was dissolved in 1982. In 1984, he married Caroline Ann Rushton. In Who's Who, his recreations were listed as "ski-ing, shooting, riding, fishing". He lived on a farm in Temple Guiting in Cheltenham.

Marland died in April 2021, at the age of 81.

Parliament of the United Kingdom
Preceded by John Watkinson	Member of Parliament for West Gloucestershire; 1979 – 1997	Constituency abolished
Party political offices
Preceded by Richard Stephenson	President of the National Conservative Convention; March 2005 – April 2006	Succeeded by Stephen Castle
