= Rose Hill School =

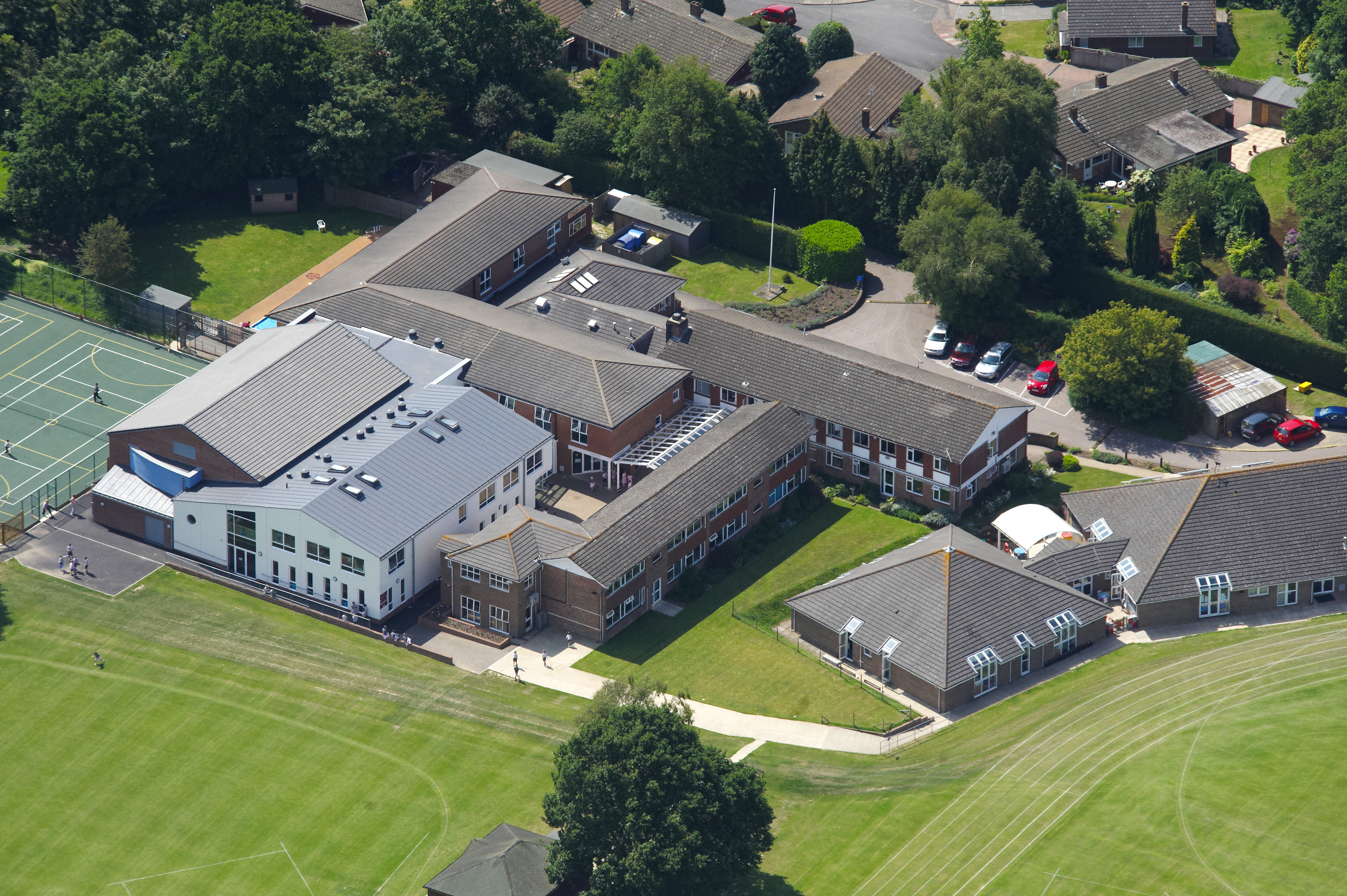

Location
- Royal Tunbridge Wells, Kent, TN4 9SY; England
- Coordinates: 51°8′24″N 0°14′46″E

Information
- Type: Preparatory school
- Motto: Nisi Dominus Frustra
- Established: 1832; 194 years ago
- Head: Emma Neville (2017)
- Gender: Mixed
- Age: 3 to 13
- Enrolment: c.300
- Houses: Baden-Powell; MacKinnon; Grange
- Colours: Burgundy and grey
- Affiliation: Independent Association of Preparatory Schools
- Website: www.rosehillschool.co.uk

Rose Hill School is a co-educational preparatory school in Royal Tunbridge Wells, Kent, England. It is a member of the Independent Association of Preparatory Schools.

== Notable former pupils ==
- Robert Baden-Powell, 1st Baron Baden-Powell
- John Mew
