= Elmore, Gloucestershire =

Village in Gloucestershire, England

Coordinates: 51.8347°N 2.3097°W

Elmore
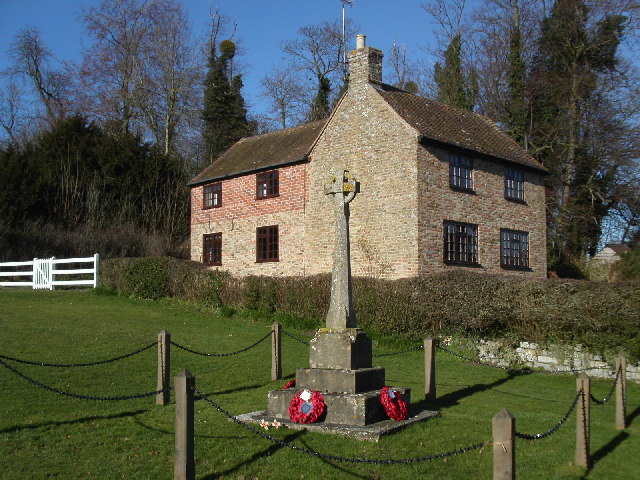
- War Memorial

- Location within Gloucestershire
- Population: 219 (2011)
- OS grid reference: SO7861
- Civil parish: Elmore
- District: Stroud
- Shire county: Gloucestershire
- Region: South West
- Country: England
- Sovereign state: United Kingdom
- Post town: GLOUCESTER
- Postcode district: GL2
- Dialling code: 01452
- Police: Gloucestershire
- Fire: Gloucestershire
- Ambulance: South Western
- UK Parliament: Stroud

For other places with the same name, see Elmore (disambiguation).

Elmore is a village and civil parish, in the Stroud district of Gloucestershire, England. The village lies on the border of Quedgeley in Gloucester, near the south bank of the River Severn, and has a population of 219.

The Manor House of the village is Elmore Court, a Grade II listed country house, which has been the family seat of the Guise family since the 13th century.

== Gallery ==
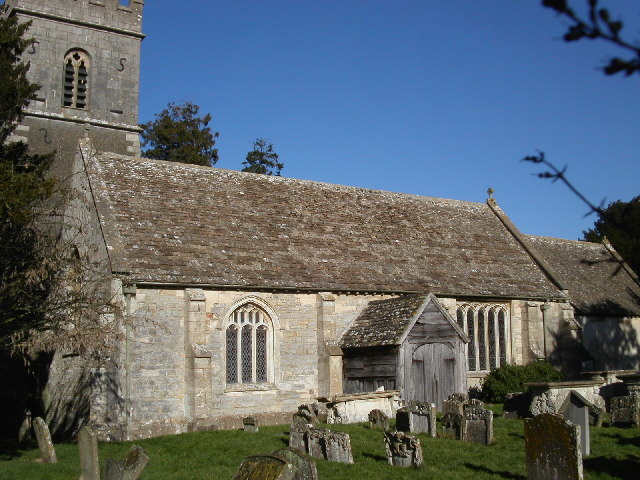
Elmore Parish Church

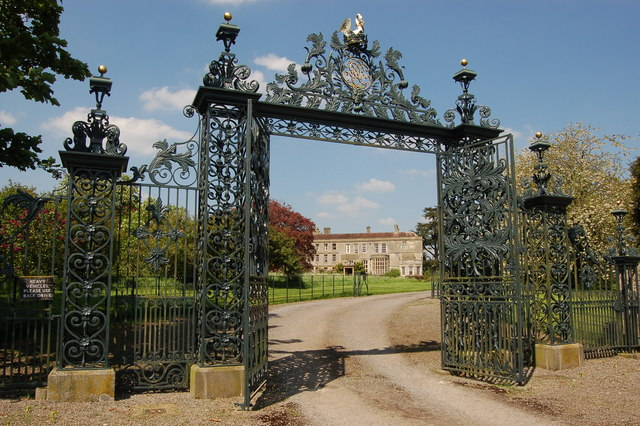
Gates of Elmore Court

== Notable people ==
- Sir Christopher Guise, 1st Baronet (c. 1617–1670)
- Sir John Guise, 2nd Baronet (c. 1654–1695)
- Sir John Guise, 3rd Baronet (c. 1678–1732)
- Sir John Guise, 4th Baronet (1701–1769)
- Sir William Guise, 5th Baronet (1737–1783)
- Sir Anselm Guise, 6th Baronet (1888–1970)
- Edward Hawkins (1789–1882), clergyman and Oxford don, was educated at Elmore Court.
