= Guise (name) =

Guise is a surname possibly derived from the Guise baronets of England or from Guise, a commune in France. Notable people with the name include:

- Anthony Guise (born 1985), French footballer
- Berkeley Guise, 2nd Baronet (1775–1834), British landowner and Member of Parliament
- Sir Christopher Guise, 1st Baronet (died 1670), English politician
- Dianne Guise (born 1952), Australian politician
- John Guise (disambiguation)
- Wit Lefty Guise (1908–1968), American Major League Baseball pitcher
- Martin Guise (1780–1828), British-Peruvian admiral
- Tom Guise (1857–1930), American actor
- William Guise (disambiguation)
- Wyndham Guise (active 1913–1929), British actor

== See also ==
- Guise (disambiguation)
- General Guise (disambiguation)
- Mademoiselle de Guise (disambiguation)
- Michel DeGuise (born 1951), Canadian ice hockey player
