= Guisse =

Guisse is a surname. Notable people with the name include:

- Martin George Guisse (1780–1828), British naval officer
- Saliyya Guisse (born 1996), Belgian triple jumper

== See also ==
- El Hadji Guissé, Senegalese judge
- Guise (name)
- Guise (disambiguation)
