= Guise baronets of Elmore (1661) =

Escutcheon of the Guise baronets of Elmore

The Guise baronetcy, of Elmore in the County of Gloucester, was created in the Baronetage of England on 10 July 1661 for Christopher Guise, Member of Parliament (MP) for Gloucestershire in the First Protectorate Parliament. His father William Guise had been High Sheriff of Gloucestershire in 1647.

The 2nd Baronet, a strong Whig, also sat as MP for Gloucestershire, from 1679 to 1681, and from 1689 to 1695. The 3rd Baronet represented Gloucestershire from 1705 to 1710, and Great Marlow from 1722 to 1727, as MP. The 4th Baronet was MP for Aylesbury from 1722 to 1727, and the 5th Baronet for Gloucestershire from 1770 to 1783.

The title became extinct on the death in 1783 of the 5th Baronet.

== Guise baronets, of Elmore (1661) ==
- Sir Christopher Guise, 1st Baronet (c. 1617–1670)
- Sir John Guise, 2nd Baronet (c.1654–1695)
- Sir John Guise, 3rd Baronet (c.1678–1732)
- Sir John Guise, 4th Baronet (1701–1769)
- Sir William Guise, 5th Baronet (1737–1783)
