= Annabella Blount =

English poet (fl. 1700–1741)

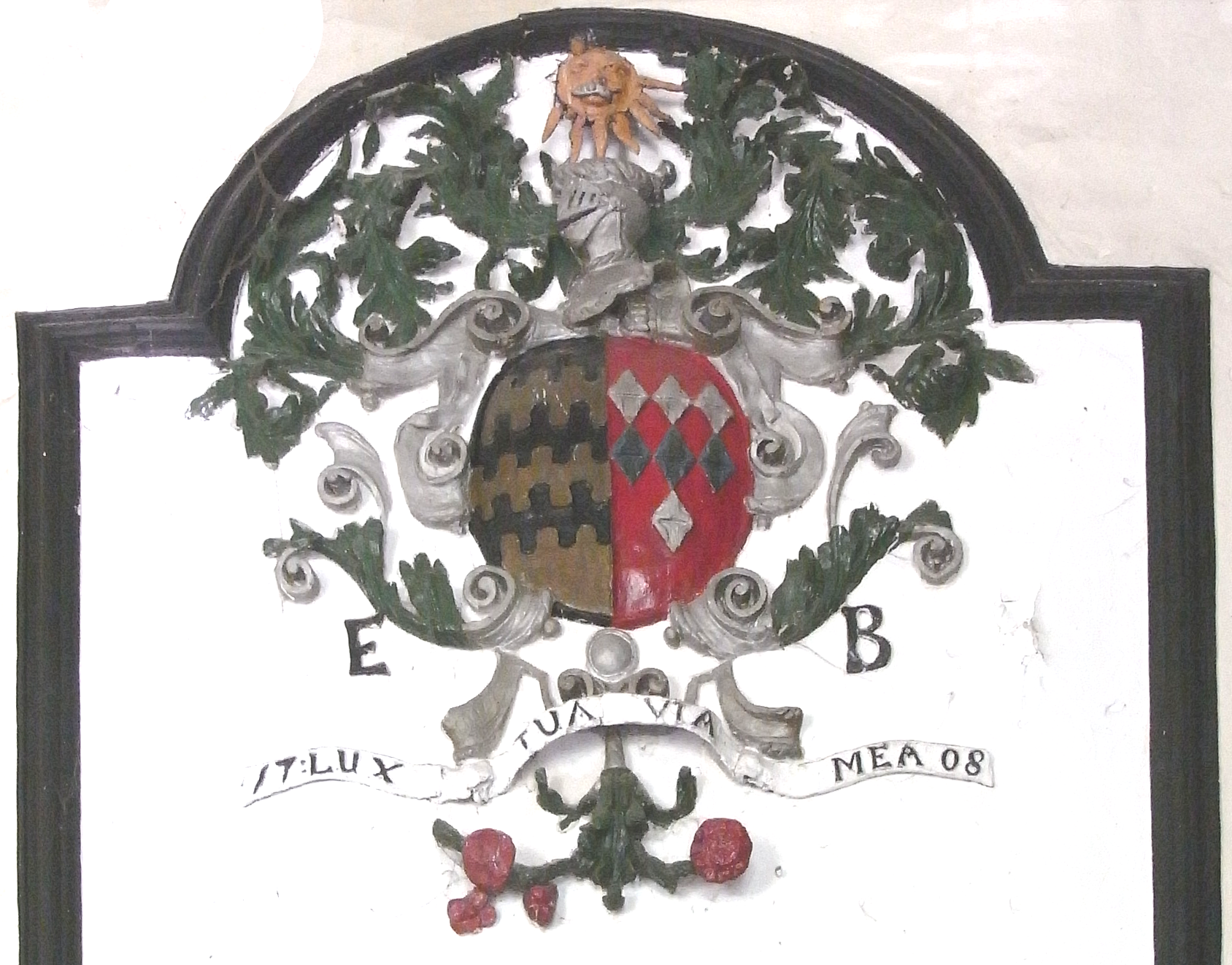
- Heraldic overmantle above fireplace of great hall, Blagdon manor house. Giuse and Blount family arms.
- Born: Annabella Guise
- Other names: Anne, Arabella
- Occupation: Poet
- Spouse: Edward Blount (m. 1700; died 1727)
- Children: Elizabeth; Mary Howard, Duchess of Norfolk; Henrietta Howard (formerly Proli); Anne Blount
- Parents: Sir John Guise (father); Elizabeth Grubham Howe (mother)
- Relatives: Sir John Guise, 3rd Baronet (brother)
- Family: Guise; Blount

Annabella Blount (née Guise; fl. 1700–1741) was an English gentlewoman and poet, though her work remained unpublished during her lifetime and only one piece survives: A Cure for Poetry.

== Early life ==
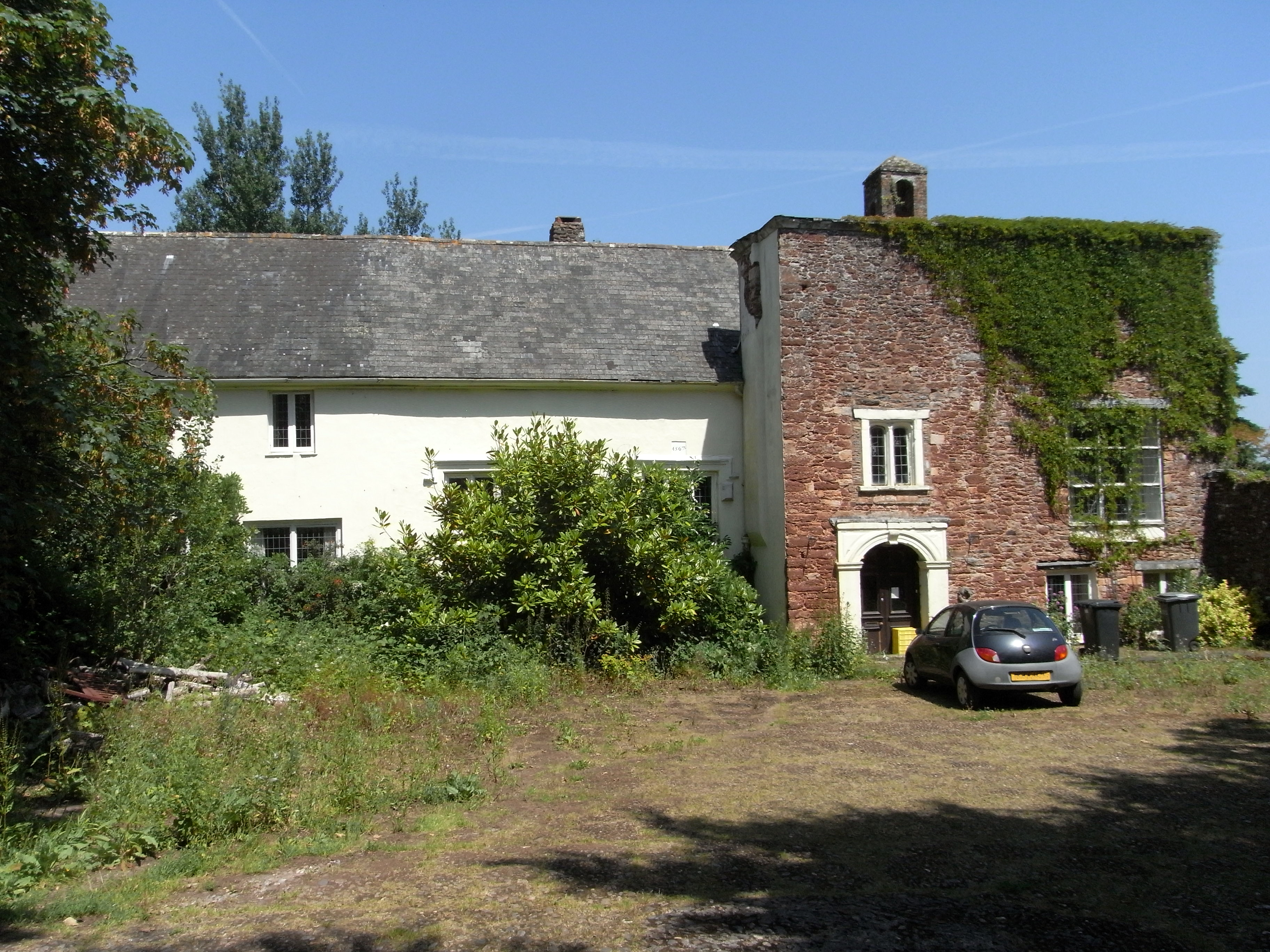
Blagdon Manor, Annabella and Edward Blount's marital home, survives as a grade II listed building

Annabella Guise was the eldest daughter of Elizabeth Grubham Howe and Sir John Guise of Rendcomb, Glouchestershire (c.1654 – 1695). She had a younger sister, and a brother, John, who succeeded their father.

Her father encouraged her intellectual and artistic interests; he called her "a surprising genius" and had her taught Latin, Spanish, Italian, and French, "all of which she is a perfect mistress of." He died relatively young, however, of smallpox, and her brother, once he was head of the family, disapproved of his sister being "a woman of great wit" and blamed her bookishness for her marriage to Edward Blount. Blount was considerably older than Guise, as a younger son had no land and little money, and was Roman Catholic; she nevertheless married him, against her family's advice, on 29 May 1700. He was "about 38" and she was "aged 21 and upwards, and at her own disposal." The couple spent their early married life at Blagdon Manor near Paignton, Devon. According to her brother, Blount converted to Catholicism within a decade or so of her marriage. Edward Blount's financial situation improved substantially and he was "a considerable landholder" by 1717. They relocated to Europe for a time due to anti-Catholic sentiment in England. They had four daughters: Elizabeth, Mary, Henrietta, and Anne.

== Later life ==
After her husband's death in 1727, Blount moved with her two youngest daughters to Antwerp, where she seems to have lived in semi-retirement for the balance of her life.

== Writing ==
Although Blount gave up writing, she remained well-connected to literary circles. Her husband was a good friend of Alexander Pope, and she herself, long after her husband's death, was in correspondence with Frances Seymour, a well-known poet, literary patron and woman of letters. Late in her life she claimed to have burnt all her poems and called them "follies of her youth." She sent her one known poem, "A Cure for Poetry," to Seymour in a letter dated 5 August, 1741. The poem was not published in her lifetime and was generally unknown until Roger Lonsdale published it in his important collection, Eighteenth-Century Women Poets, in 1989.

"A Cure for Poetry" consists of 54 lines of heroic couplets. The poem follows the career of the young female poet from their ambitious youth to a wiser older age. When young, they were encouraged by their father — "A father fondly looked on all I writ" (l. 12) — and "longed for fame, and hungered after bays" (l. 17). They have a vision of their brother, who admonishes them to "Turn thou thy sense to housewife's wiser cares / Mind well thy needlework, and say thy prayers" (ll. 28-29). After this visitation, the poet reports that "My opened mind began to judge aright" (l. 33). They decided to value wisdom over wit, and were rewarded when they met and married "Blount," wise Apollo's "favourite and his friend" (l. 44).

=== "A Cure for Poetry" ===
I SOUGHT instruction from my dawning years,
My father to my playfellows preferred;
Whate'er he spoke with deep attention heard:
He laid those grounds that nothing can remove,
Care of my honour, and my country's love.
Whate'er he taught I eagerly would learn;
And, while to please him was my whole concern,
His chase I followed o'er his spacious down,
Joyed with his grace, and trembling at his frown.
Early I tasted the Castalian spring;
My almost infant muse had tried her wing:
A father fondly looked on all I writ;
Winkle himself had voted me a wit:
Old Guiret, charmed with all that I had done,
Declared my verses tasted of the sun.
Already fired with sacred love of praise,
I longed for fame, and hungered after bays.
Cypress I scorned; the Muses were my care;
And Phoebus heard my late and early prayer:
He heard indeed and, standing by my bed,
Assumed my brother's friendly form, and said:
'Why wilt thou, Nan, so ill employ thy wit
In manly works, for ladies' hands unfit?
Of all thy sex that sought the poet's fame,
Is there one character thou dost not blame?
And wilt thou vainly misemploy thy days
In what ne'er was the virtuous woman's praise?
Turn thou thy sense to housewife's wiser cares,
Mind well thy needlework, and say thy prayers:
Secure, in this advice that I have given,
Of peace on earth, and endless peace in heaven.'
He said, and vanished in a flash of light;
My opened mind began to judge aright;
Muse, rhymes and verse in mixed confusion fled,
I burned the trifling products of my head.
Where poets stood before, receipt-books stand,
Silk, thread and worsted are my next demand,
And chairs and stools increase beneath my labouring hand.
Yet would I learn what ancient bards have taught,
But wisdom now, not wit, in Horace sought.
Apollo, pleased I thus obeyed his voice,
(Himself my Cupid) made my marriage choice.
No vulgar genius did his care commend,
He gave me Blount, his favourite and his friend;
To draw whose character exceeds my art,
I bear it deep engraven in my heart;
Yet this one print drawn out, I'll dare to say
Phoebus himself can scarce the whole display.
Though the least blot his piercing wit could know,
He would not sharply censure ev'n his foe;
Yet what was bad he never would commend,
But silent hide the errors of his friend.
His fair example, and endearing art,
Improved my judgement, and reformed my heart.

(Written in 1741 at the latest.)

== See also ==
- Mary Howard, Duchess of Norfolk (died 1773)

== Sources ==
- Baird, Rosemary. Mistress of the house : great ladies and grand houses, 1670-1830. London: Weidenfeld & Nicolson, 2003. (Available via Internet Archive)
- Kilburn, Matthew. "Howard [née Blount], Mary, duchess of Norfolk (1701/2–1773), noblewoman." Oxford Dictionary of National Biography. September 23, 2004. Oxford University Press. Date of access 3 Jun. 2026.
- Lonsdale, Roger, ed. "Annabella Blount (née Guise; fl. 1700–1741)." Eighteenth-Century Women Poets: An Oxford Anthology. Oxford University Press, 1989, 185-188, 525. (Available via Internet Archive)
