= John Guise =

John Guise may refer to:

- Sir John Guise, 2nd Baronet (c.1654–1695), English MP for Gloucestershire
- Sir John Guise, 3rd Baronet (c.1678–1732), English MP for Great Marlow and Gloucestershire
- John Guyse (1680–1761), also spelt Guise, English minister
- John Guise (British Army officer) (1682/3–1765), art collector
- Sir John Guise, 4th Baronet (1701–1769), MP for Aylesbury
- Sir John Guise, 1st Baronet (1733–1794), of the Guise baronets
- Sir John Wright Guise, 3rd Baronet GCB (1777–1865), of the Guise baronets
- John Christopher Guise (1826–1895), British Army officer, Victoria Cross recipient
- John Lindsay Guise (1903–1991), English cricketer
- Sir John Guise (1914–1991), Governor-General of Papua New Guinea
- Sir John Guise, 7th Baronet (1927–2007), of the Guise baronets

== See also ==
- John of Lothringen-Guise
