= Matthew Moreton, 1st Baron Ducie =

Matthew Ducie Moreton, 1st Baron Ducie (1663–1735) of Moreton, Staffordshire, and Tortworth, Gloucestershire, was a British Army officer and politician who sat in the House of Commons between 1708 and 1720 when he was raised to the peerage as Baron Ducie.

Some early sources call him Matthew-Ducie Moreton, as at the time it was so unusual for anyone to have more than one forename.

Moreton was baptized on 17 March 1663, the eldest son of Edward Moreton of Moreton and Engleton, Staffordshire and his wife Elizabeth Ducie, daughter of Robert Ducie of Little Aston, Staffordshire. His mother was heir to her uncle William Ducie, 1st Viscount Downe, of Tortworth, who died in 1679. He was admitted at Queens' College, Cambridge in 1681 and awarded MA in 1682.

Moreton joined the army and was a cornet in Lord Grey's independent troop of horse in 1685 at the time of the Monmouth rebellion. This was disbanded after the Battle of Sedgemoor. In 1687, he transferred to the 3rd Dragoon Guards and served in Flanders during the reign of William III. His father died in 1687 and he succeeded to his estate. He was a captain by September 1689 and Major in 1690. He married Arabella Prestwick (died 1750), daughter of Sir Thomas Prestwick, 2nd Baronet, of Hulme, Lancashire on 11 January 1690. He became a lieutenant colonel in 1694 and resigned his commission between 1697 and 1702, after the end of the war in Flanders. He was successively High Sheriff of Staffordshire for the year 1704 to 1705, and High Sheriff of Gloucestershire for the year 1705 to 1706.

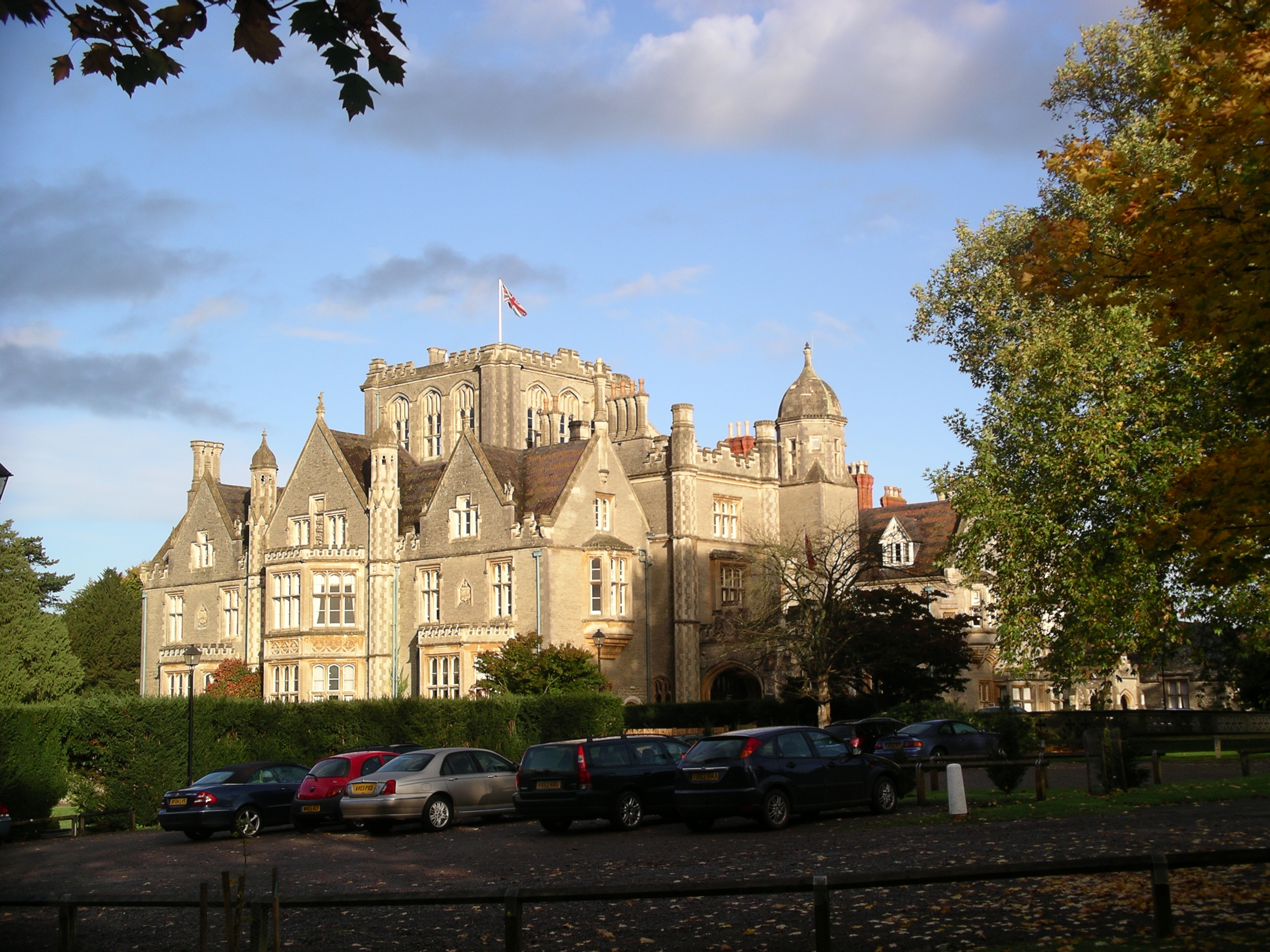
Tortworth Court came into the family from Lord Ducie

At the 1708 general election Moreton was elected Member of Parliament for Gloucestershire on the Whig interest. He was active in Parliament and supported Whig policies. The electoral contest at Gloucestershire in 1710 was hard-fought, but Moreton was returned as MP despite having expressed contrary views on the Church of England. He was narrowly defeated at Gloucestershire at the 1713 general election. He regained his seat at Gloucestershire in 1715. In 1717, he was appointed vice-treasurer for Ireland in 1717 and made an Irish Privy Councillor. In 1720 he was relieved of his lucrative post to make way for someone else, and created Baron Ducie on 9 June 1720 as compensation. Consequently, he was required to vacate his seat in the House of Commons.

Lord Ducie died on 2 May 1735 and was buried at Tortworth aged 76. He and his wife had three sons and four daughters. He was succeeded by his son Matthew. One daughter, Elizabeth, married Francis Reynolds from whom the Barons Ducie of the second creation was descended.

Parliament of Great Britain
Preceded by Maynard Colchester; Sir John Guise, 3rd Bt	Member of Parliament for Gloucestershire; 1708–1713; With: Sir John Guise, 3rd Bt 1708-1710; John Symes Berkeley 1710-1713	Succeeded by Thomas Stephens; John Symes Berkeley
Preceded by Thomas Stephens; John Symes Berkeley	Member of Parliament for Gloucestershire; 1715–1720; With: Thomas Stephens 1715-1720; Hon. Henry Berkeley 1720	Succeeded by Hon. Henry Berkeley; Edmund Bray
Peerage of Great Britain
New creation	Baron Ducie; 1720–1735	Succeeded by Matthew Ducie Moreton
