= William Guise (disambiguation) =

William Guise was an orientalist.

William Guise may also refer to:

- Sir William Guise, 5th Baronet (1737–1783), MP for Gloucestershire
- Sir William Vernon Guise, 4th Baronet (1816–1887), of the Guise baronets
- Sir William Francis George Guise, 5th Baronet (1851–1920), of the Guise baronets

== See also ==
- Guise (surname)
