= Mary Howard, Duchess of Norfolk (died 1773) =

British peeress after whom Norfolk Island was named

Her Grace The Duchess of Norfolk
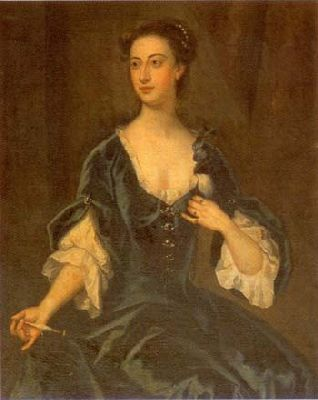
- The Duchess in the 1730s, by William Hoare
- Born: 1712
- Died: 1773 (aged 60–61)
- Spouse: Edward Howard, 9th Duke of Norfolk
- Father: Edward Blount
- Mother: Annabella Guise

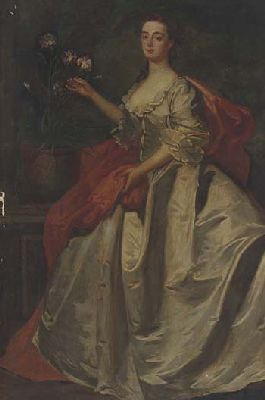
The future duchess in 1727, by James Latham

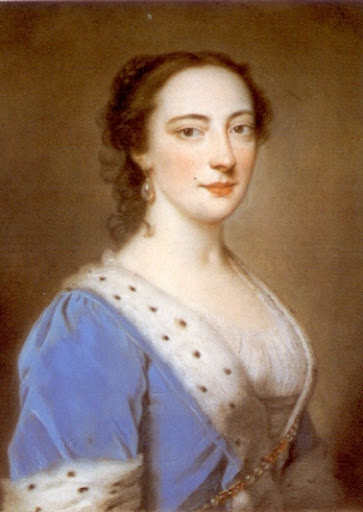
The Duchess in the 1730s, by William Hoare

Mary Howard, Duchess of Norfolk (née Mary Blount; c. 1712 – 1773), was a British noblewoman after whom Norfolk Island, a small island in the Pacific Ocean, was named.

== Early life ==
Mary Blount was the youngest of four daughters of Edward Blount (d. 1727) of Blagdon, near Paignton in Devon, by his wife Annabella Guise, a daughter of Sir John Guise, 2nd Baronet. She was a co-heiress of her father's property. Born into an exiled Roman Catholic family, she spent her adolescence and early years of marriage on the continent. On 26 November 1727, she married Edward Howard, who in 1732 succeeded as the 9th Duke of Norfolk, upon the death of his elder brother Thomas Howard, 8th Duke of Norfolk.

== Activities ==
The pair were socially active, using their position as the highest-ranking peers in the kingdom to promote religious tolerance. As Roman Catholics whose immediate predecessors, the 8th Duke and his wife Maria Shireburn, had supported the Jacobite rising of 1715, Mary and Edward Howard were keen to express their support of the Protestant monarch King George II. The Duchess was intelligent and assertive; she was referred to as "My Lord Duchess" by Horace Walpole. Her interest in arts drove her to restore Norfolk House in 1755. An ardent Catholic, she was very fond of French and Italian fashion and styles, employing Giovanni Battista Borra to decorate that residence. The newly built Music Room was a particularly important part of Norfolk House, used by the Duchess for receptions, but it contained no musical instruments.

She proceeded to renovate Worksop Manor House. After it burned down in 1761, the Duchess had it restored once again. The childless couple had decided to rebuild the house for the benefit of their nephew Thomas Howard, heir presumptive to the dukedom. Further building was abandoned after the deaths of Thomas and his half-brother Edward in 1763 and 1767, respectively.

== Death and legacy ==
The Duchess died in 1773. Her marriage had been childless, and her husband survived her. According to the astronomer William Wales, she had asked the explorer Captain James Cook to name an island after her. He had not heard about the Duchess's death when he discovered a suitable one which he named Norfolk Island in her honour.

== Bibliography ==
- Of Her Making: the cultural practices of Mary Blount, 9th Duchess of Norfolk, Tulsa Studies in Women's Literature, 2012.
