= Lassington Wood =

Nature reserve in Gloucestershire, England

Coordinates: 51°52′51″N 02°17′13″W

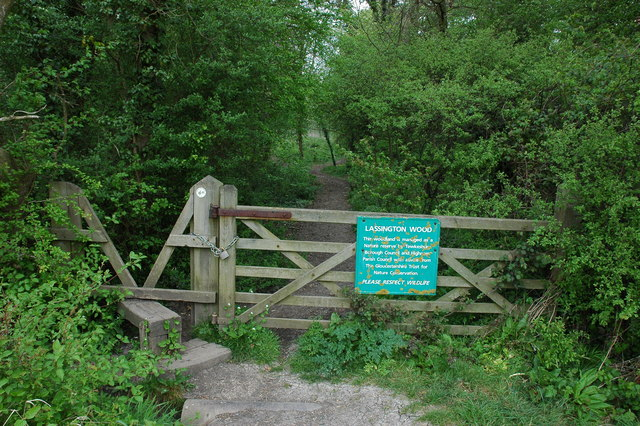
The entrance to Lassington Wood

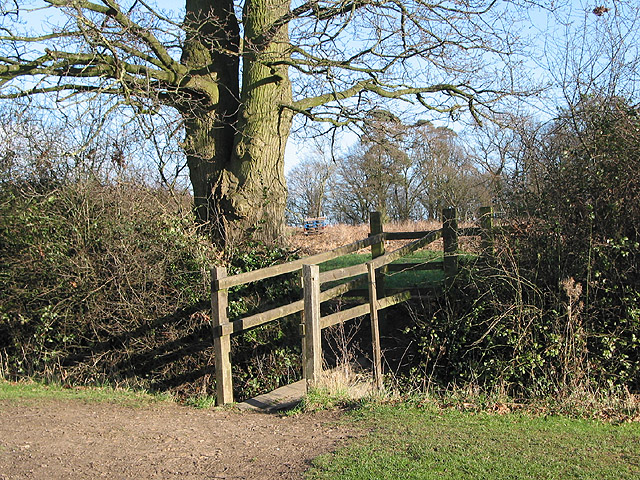
Footbridge access

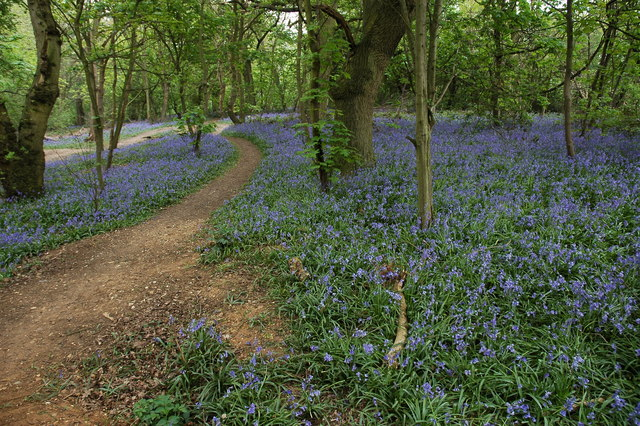
Bluebells in the wood

Lassington Wood is a nature reserve near Highnam, Gloucestershire. Part of the estate of the Guise family since the 13th century it was acquired by Gloucester County Borough Council in 1921 as permanent public open space. It is now owned by Tewkesbury Borough Council and managed jointly with Highnam Parish Council. The wood was the site of the Lassington Oak, a notable tree until it fell in 1960.

== History ==
The wood was part of the 623 acres (252 ha) estate of the Guise family. The land had been granted to their ancestor Anselm de Gyse by John of Burgh, a son of Hubert de Burgh, 1st Earl of Kent, in 1274. The River Leadon formerly split into two channels, one of which ran by the eastern boundary of the woodland, this channel was diverted in 1867 and has since silted up. Sir Anselm Guise sold the estate in 1921 but retained ownership of the wood, which he then donated to Gloucester County Borough Council. This was as a mark of the Guise family's long association with the city.

By 1980 the land comprised 2–3 acres (0.81–1.21 ha) of woodland. Consideration was given to donating the land to Tewkesbury Borough Council who were looking to improve and reforest the surrounding land. The woods are now managed by Tewkesbury Borough Council and Highnam Parish Council as a 7.05 hectares (17.4 acres) nature reserve. The site is noted for its large number of bluebells.

== Lassington Oak ==
The wood was formerly home to the Lassington Oak, described in the 1879 Encyclopædia Britannica as one of the four most notable trees in Gloucestershire. It stood on a patch of high ground with clear views to the city of Gloucester. In the mid-19th century the tree was frequently visited by groups of travelling Romani people. In 1880 it was measured as being 38 feet 6 inches (11.73 m) in girth at the base and was 24 feet 6 inches (7.47 m) immediately below the first branches. The branches themselves extended 93 feet (28 m) from the trunk. In 1892 it measured 29 feet 3 inches (8.92 m) in girth at a height of 2 feet (0.61 m) above the ground.

Parts of the tree were reported to have been dead as early as 1838 and the tree had to be propped by 1898. The oak had a dozen props by 1916 and, though it showed signs of decay, continued to put out new buds and leaves. In 1920 members of the Gloucester lodge of the Ancient Order of Druids planted 12 oak seedlings around the tree. The tree fell in high winds in 1960, by which time it was judged to be 600 years old and 30 feet (9.1 m) in girth. By 1980 all that remained was a rotting shell of its trunk, parts of which remained in 2011, though they had been set on fire. A replacement tree, planted nearby, was flourishing by 2011. A local Morris dancing group, formed in 1977, was named after the tree.
