= Giovanni Battista Borra =

Italian architect and engineer

- Born: 27 December 1713; Dogliani
- Died: November 1770 (aged 56); Turin
- Occupations: architect, engineer
- Notable work: see list

Giovanni Battista Borra (27 December 1713 – November 1770) was an Italian architect, engineer and architectural draughtsman born in Dogliani and believed to have died in Turin.

== Life ==
Borra studied under Bernardo Antonio Vittone from 1733 to 1736 (producing 10 plates for his teacher's Istruzione elementari per indirizzo de' giovani allo studio dell'architettura civile, published in Lugano in 1760) In 1748 he published a work of his own, a handbook on the stability of buildings, practical in tone. He met Robert Wood in Rome, and joined his 1750–51 antiquarian expedition to Asia Minor and Syria as its architectural draughtsman. He returned with Wood to England, where he used his sketchbooks (now in the library of the Society for the Promotion of Hellenic Studies, London) to produce the original drawings (now in the Royal Institute of British Architects) for Wood's The Ruins of Balbec and The Ruins of Palmyra. From 1752 to 1760 he carried out commissions for English patrons. These works and their images led to motifs from Baalbek and Palmyra becoming fashionable for ceiling and interior decorations in England and Italy (Borra used them, for example, in his own work on the south facade of the Palazzo Isnardi and the interior decoration of its Sala d'Ercole and Sala di Diana, on the piano nobile).

== Works ==
- Norfolk House, St James's Square, London (destroyed in 1938; Music Room reconstructed at the V&A) - Rococo interiors, 1755, commissioned by Mary Howard, Duchess of Norfolk
- Stowe House
  - Interior decoration, commissioned by Richard Grenville, 2nd Earl Temple
  - Alterations to and execution of Robert Adam's design for the south front
  - Alterations to the garden buildings by John Vanbrugh and James Gibbs, so that they conformed to Grenville's taste for the Neo-classical
- Guarino Guarini's Castello dei Racconigi, near Turin (1676–1683) - remodelling and extension, commissioned by Prince Ludovico di Carignano
- Piedmontese palazzi, notably:
  - The Palazzo Isnardi di Caraglio in Turin (c. 1766–77), in collaboration with Benedetto Innocente Alfieri
- Piedmontese churches
  - Chapel of Santo Sudario with a Palladian facade for the Senate of Nice, 1763
- 1760–1770 - designed fortifications at Alessandria and several Piedmontese hydraulic projects
