= Sir John Guise, 3rd Baronet =

English Member of Parliament

Sir John Guise, 3rd Baronet (c. 1677–1732) of Elmore Court, Gloucestershire was a British landowner and politician who sat in the House of Commons between 1705 and 1727.

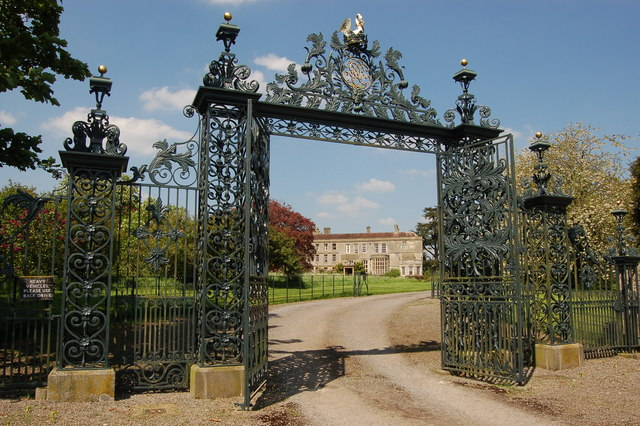
Elmore Court, Gloucestershire

Guise was the only son of Sir John Guise, 2nd Baronet and his wife Elizabeth Howe, daughter of John Grubham Howe, MP of Compton Abdale, Gloucestershire and Langar, Nottinghamshire. He was granted the office of Constable of Gloucester Castle in May 1690, at the age of 12 and his father put him forward at the1695 general election for Cirencester. He was unsuccessful there. He succeeded to the baronetcy on the death of his father on 19 November 1695 and he tried to replace his father as MP for Gloucestershire by standing in the ensuing by-election. Despite spending £1,000, he was defeated. In 1697 he was Colonel of the White Regiment of Gloucestershire Militia.

Guise married by licence dated 4 June 1696, Elizabeth Napier, daughter of Sir Nathaniel Napier, 2nd Baronet, MP of Critchell More, Dorset. His father's estate was in a parlous financial state, and he was bound by his wife's trustees in a tight marriage settlement which forced him to retrench. He was still involved in politics but wavered between his Tory uncle Jack Howe and the local Whig gentry. His wife died in 1701 and he stood at the 1702 general election at Gloucestershire. Although he won more votes than his uncle, the Sheriff discounted many of them leaving him to petition unsuccessfully.

Guise was finally elected Member of Parliament for Gloucestershire at the 1705 general election. He was re-elected at the 1708 general election but started to become disenchanted with his Whig colleagues. He was defeated in 1710. He and his estates were in poor health and to restore his financial situation, he married a wealthy twice-married widow. She was Anne, the daughter of Sir Francis Russell, 3rd Baronet MP of Strensham, Worcestershire whom he married by licence dated 2 January 1711. Her former husbands were Richard Lygon of Madresfield, Worcestershire, and Sir Henry Every, 3rd Baronet, of Egginton, Derbyshire. He was bound again in a strict marriage settlement and was also forced to give up the post of Constable of Gloucester Castle in 1711.

In 1719 Guise bought the manors of Harleyford and Great Marlow from Sir James Etheridge, MP thus acquiring a strong political interest there. He was elected MP for Great Marlow at the 1722 general election. He was defeated in 1727 and did not stand for Parliament again.

Guise died on 16 November 1732 leaving an only son by his first wife, John, who succeeded to the baronetcy.

Parliament of England
Preceded by Maynard Colchester; John Grobham Howe	Member of Parliament for Gloucestershire; 1705–1708; With: Maynard Colchester	Succeeded by Parliament of Great Britain
Parliament of Great Britain
Preceded by Parliament of England	Member of Parliament for Gloucestershire; 1708–1710; With: Matthew Ducie Moreton	Succeeded by Matthew Ducie Moreton; John Symes Berkeley
Preceded by The Lord Shelburne; George Bruere	Member of Parliament for Great Marlow; 1722–1727; With: Edmund Waller	Succeeded by Edmund Waller; John Clavering
Baronetage of England
Preceded by John Guise	Baronet (of Elmore); 1695-1732	Succeeded by John Guise
