= Norfolk House =

Former London townhouse

Coordinates: 51°30′26″N 0°8′2″W

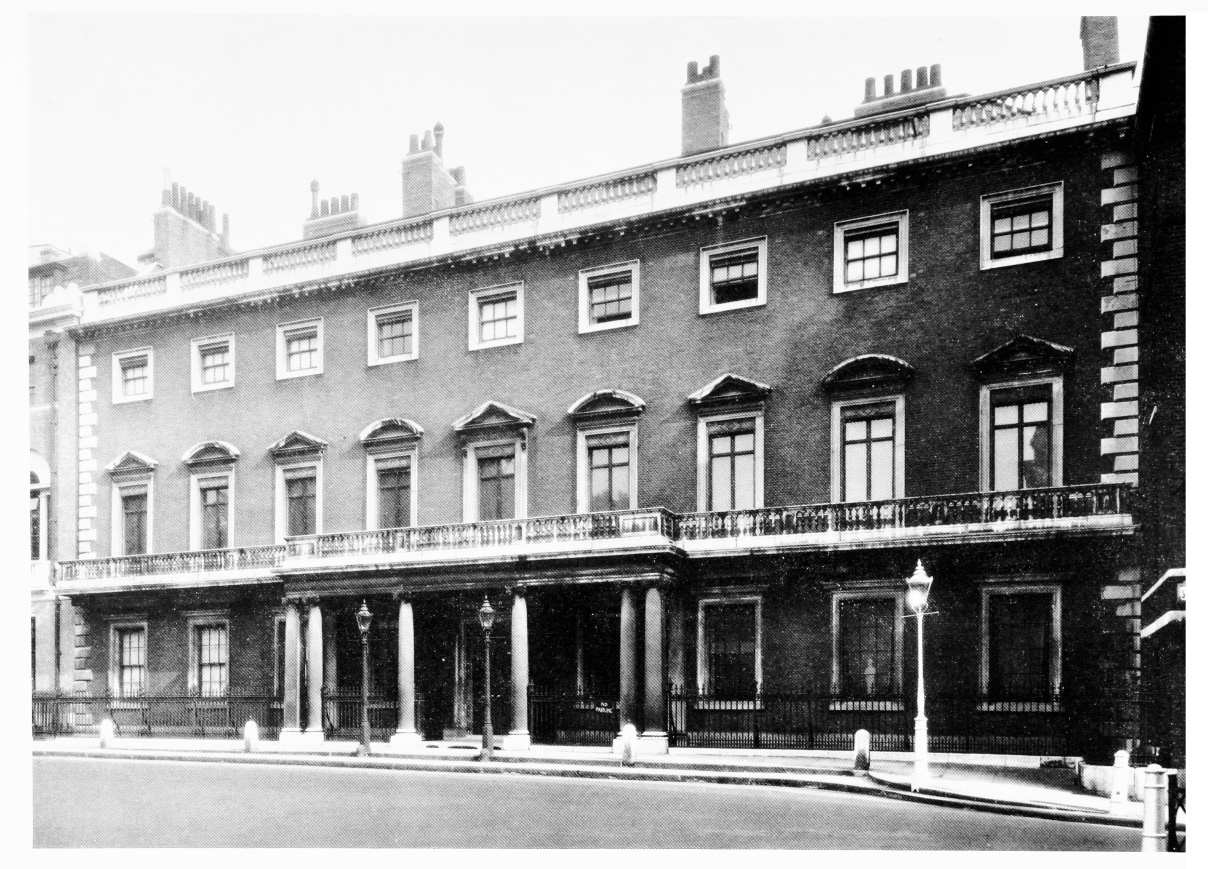
Norfolk House in 1932

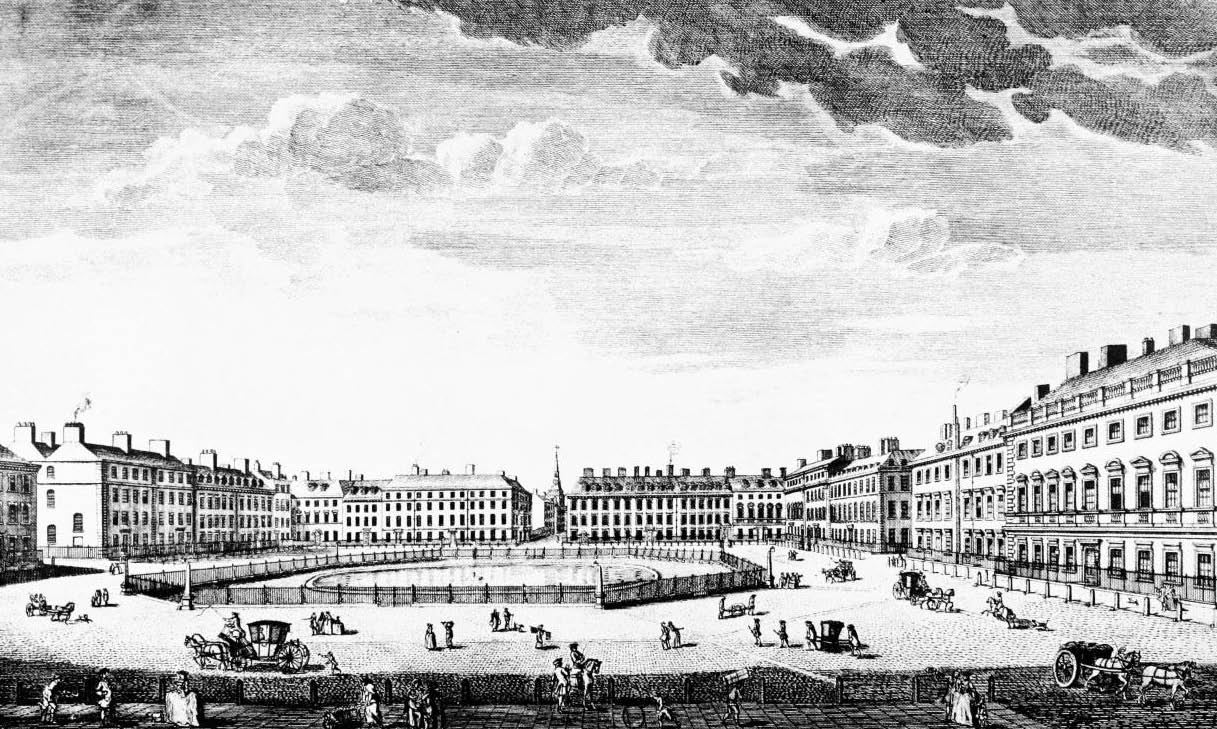
Norfolk House is on the far right on this mid-18th-century engraving.

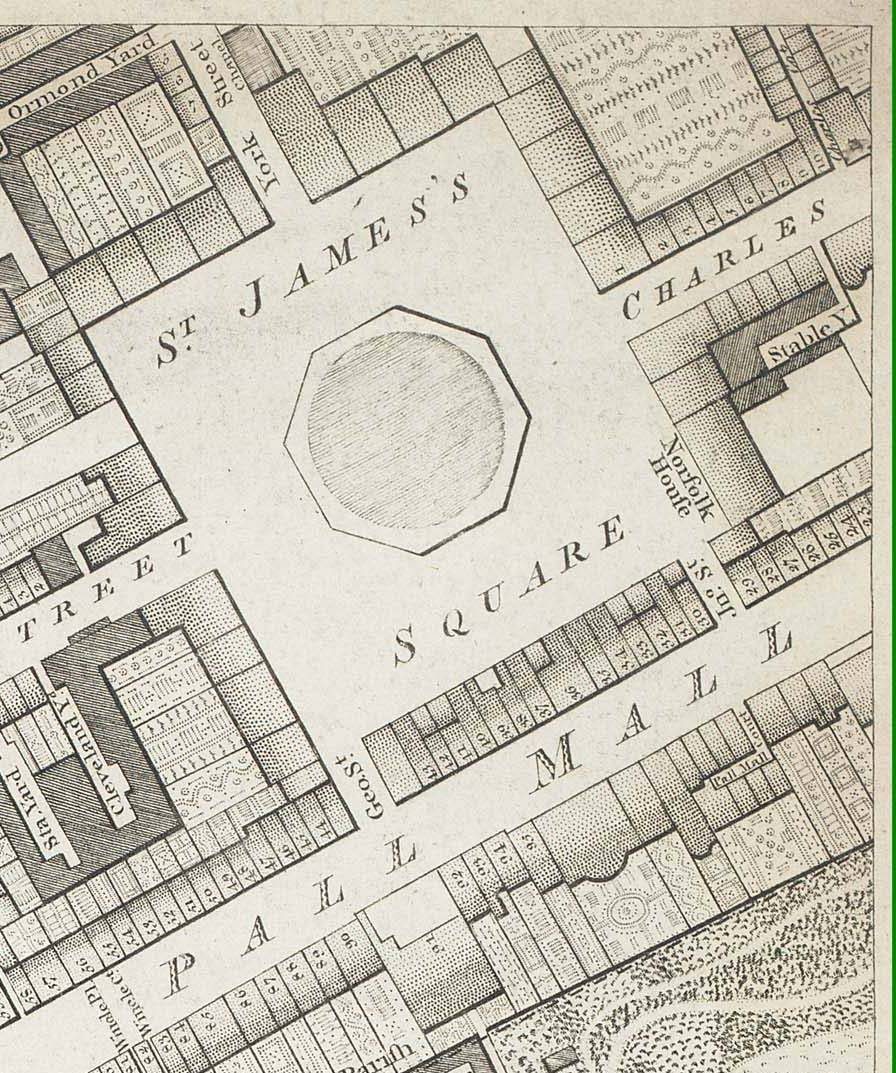
The location of Norfolk House is shown in the right-hand corner of the Square on this 1799 map.

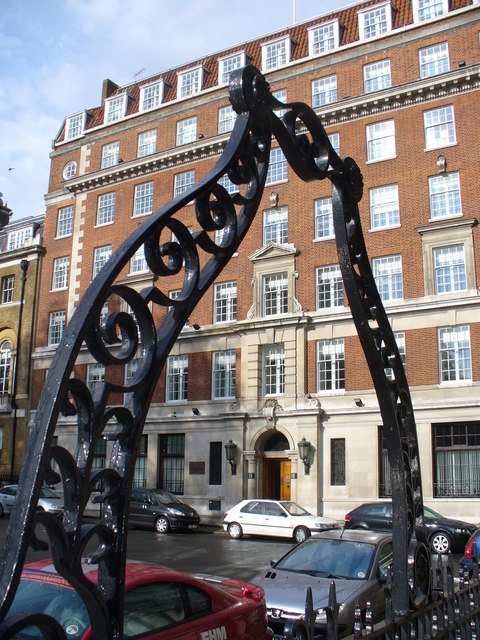
The office block known as "Norfolk House" which replaced the ducal townhouse in 1938 was demolished in 2023, but the exterior facade was carefully preserved and fitted onto the new building.

Norfolk House was the London residence of the Howard family headed by the Dukes of Norfolk, and as such more than one building has been given this name. The first was opposite Lambeth Palace, set in acres of garden and orchards on a site occupying what is now the Novotel London Waterloo on Lambeth Road (the remains of the Howard family vault and chapel still being visible in the former parish church of St Mary-at-Lambeth).

The later Norfolk House at 31 St James's Square in the City of Westminster was built between 1748 and 1752 as the townhouse of Edward Howard, 9th Duke of Norfolk (1686–1777), to the design of Matthew Brettingham (1699–1769), "the Elder". This building was demolished in 1938. The duke's country house and main seat was Worksop Manor in Nottinghamshire. Norfolk House was built on a site formerly occupied by two houses, namely St Albans House, the residence of the Earl of St Albans (purchased by Thomas Howard, 8th Duke of Norfolk in 1722), and the other the residence of John Belasyse, 1st Baron Belasyse (1614–1689) (purchased by the 9th Duke of Norfolk in 1748). Both these houses were demolished in 1748 by the 9th Duke of Norfolk in preparation for his new house.

== St Albans House ==
St Albans House was a royal residence for a short time, after the 9th Duke of Norfolk offered it to Frederick, Prince of Wales, following his marriage in 1736 to Princess Augusta of Saxe-Gotha. The couple lived there 1737–1741, and their son King George III was born in the house. The family moved to Leicester House in 1742, which remained the prince's home until his death nine years later, and that of his widow until her death in 1772.

== Norfolk House ==
Norfolk House remained in the ownership of the Dukes of Norfolk until 1938, when it was pulled down and replaced by an office building. During the Second World War this building served as offices for senior officers from a variety of Allied armed forces, including the First Canadian Army and the Supreme Headquarters Allied Expeditionary Force under General Dwight D. Eisenhower. Two plaques on the exterior of the building commemorate the role of the building in the War. The 1930s building was fully refitted in the years before 2019. The office space became obsolete for modern requirements and in 2019 plans were submitted to demolish it and rebuild at a cost of £60 million in line with modern requirements.

The building was demolished in 2023 and replaced with a modern 9-story office building called 31 St. James's Square. The historic 1938 facade was dismantled during demolition and was reinstalled on the new building, completed in 2024.

=== Music Room ===
Parts of the interior of the 18th-century house survive, having been removed before demolition, including the Music Room, designed by Giovanni Battista Borra for the ninth Duke's wife Mary Blount, now displayed in the Victoria and Albert Museum, restored and redecorated to its original scheme of brilliant white paintwork with gilt, carved woodwork.

== Gallery ==
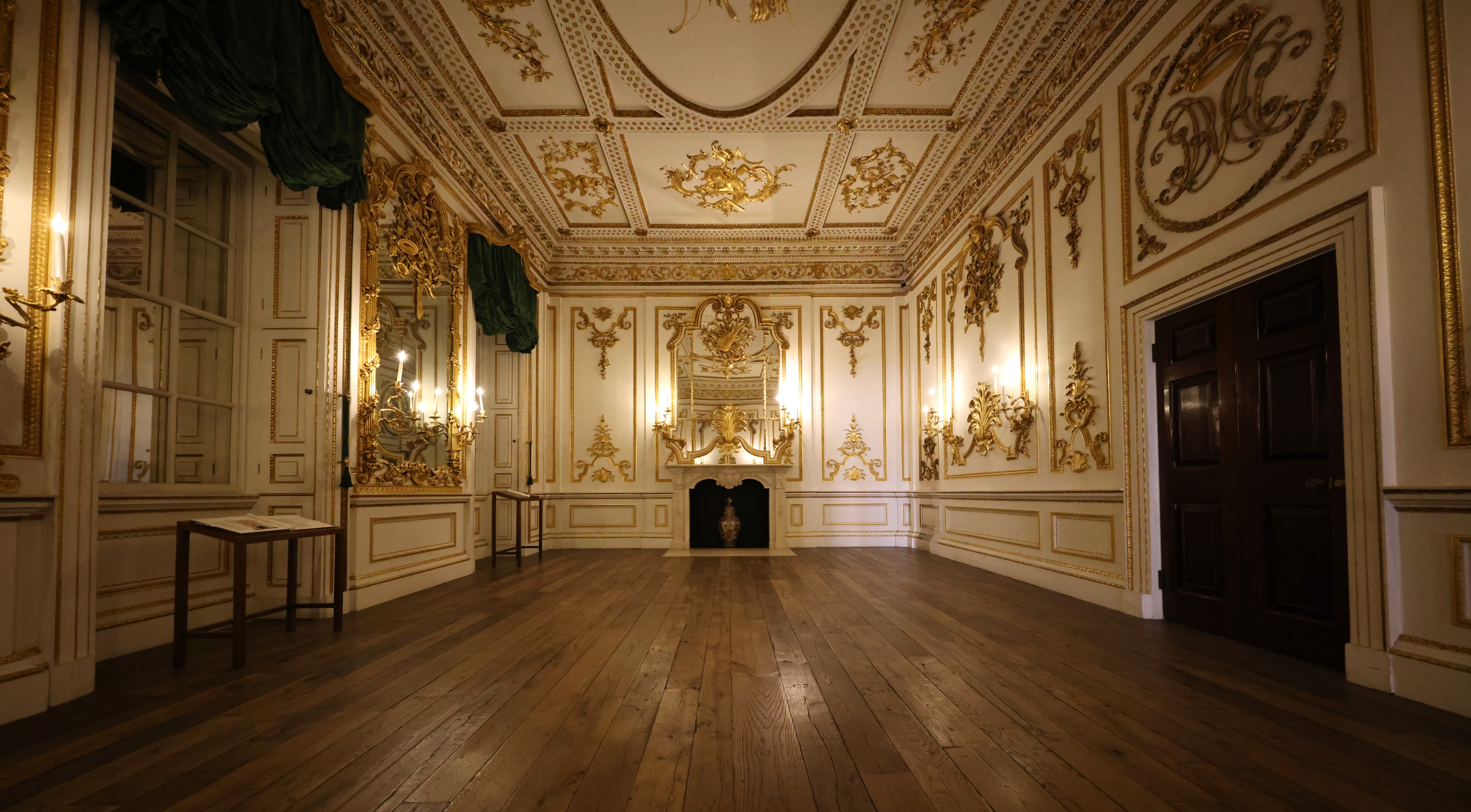
The Music Room from Norfolk House, St James's Square, London, 1748–1756 V&A Museum no. W.70:1-1938

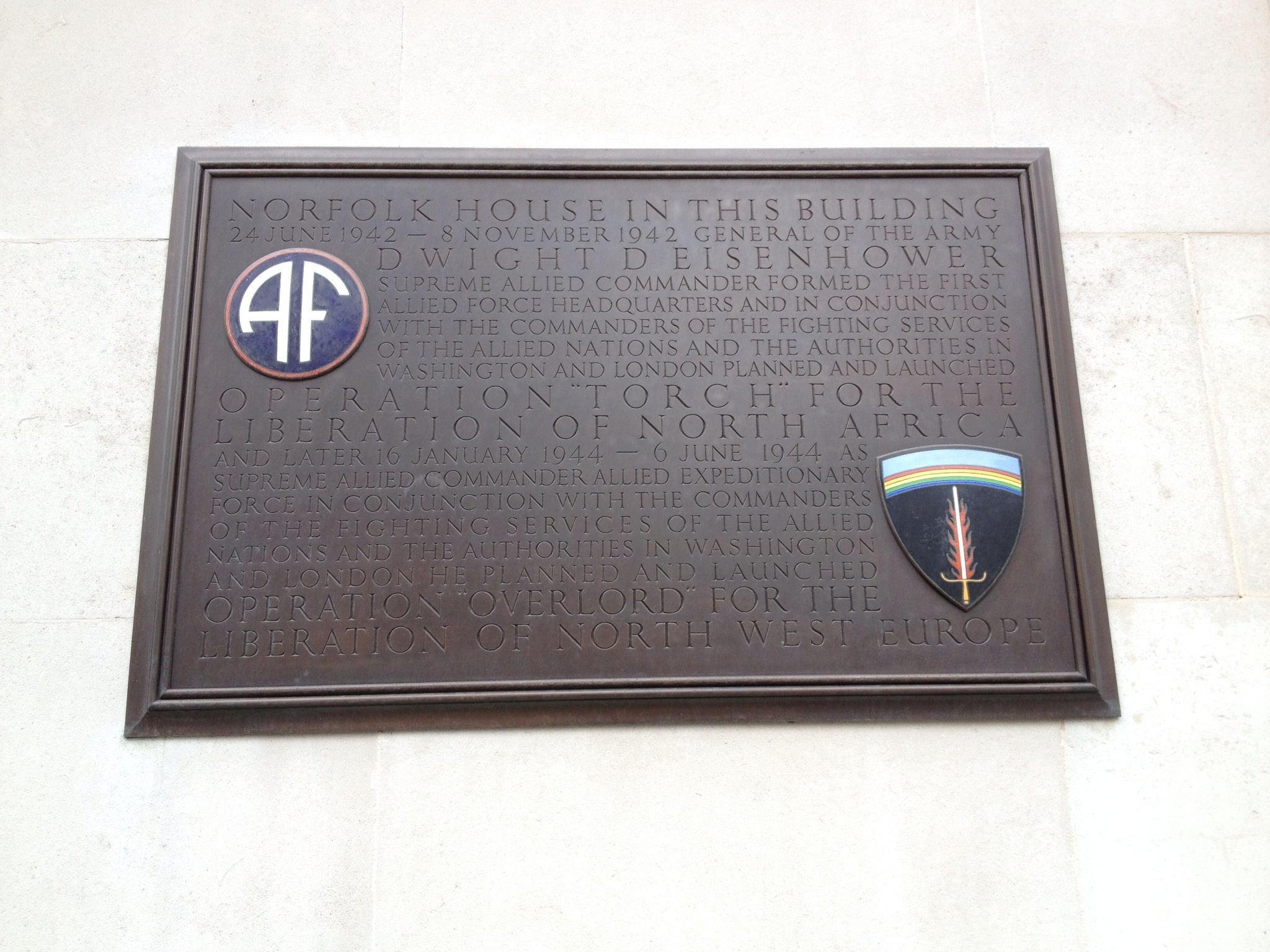
Plaque says: Norfolk House in this building 24 June 1942 – 8 November 1942 General of the army Dwight D Eisenhower Supreme Allied Commander formed the first Allied Force Headquarters and in conjunction with the commanders of the fighting services of the Allied Nations and the Authorities in Washington and London planned and launched Operation "Torch" for the liberation of North Africa and later 16 January 1944 – 6 June 1944 as Supreme Allied Commander Allied Expeditionary Force in conjunction with the commanders of the fighting services of the Allied Nations and the authorities in Washington and London he planned and launched Operation "Overlord" for the liberation of North West Europe.

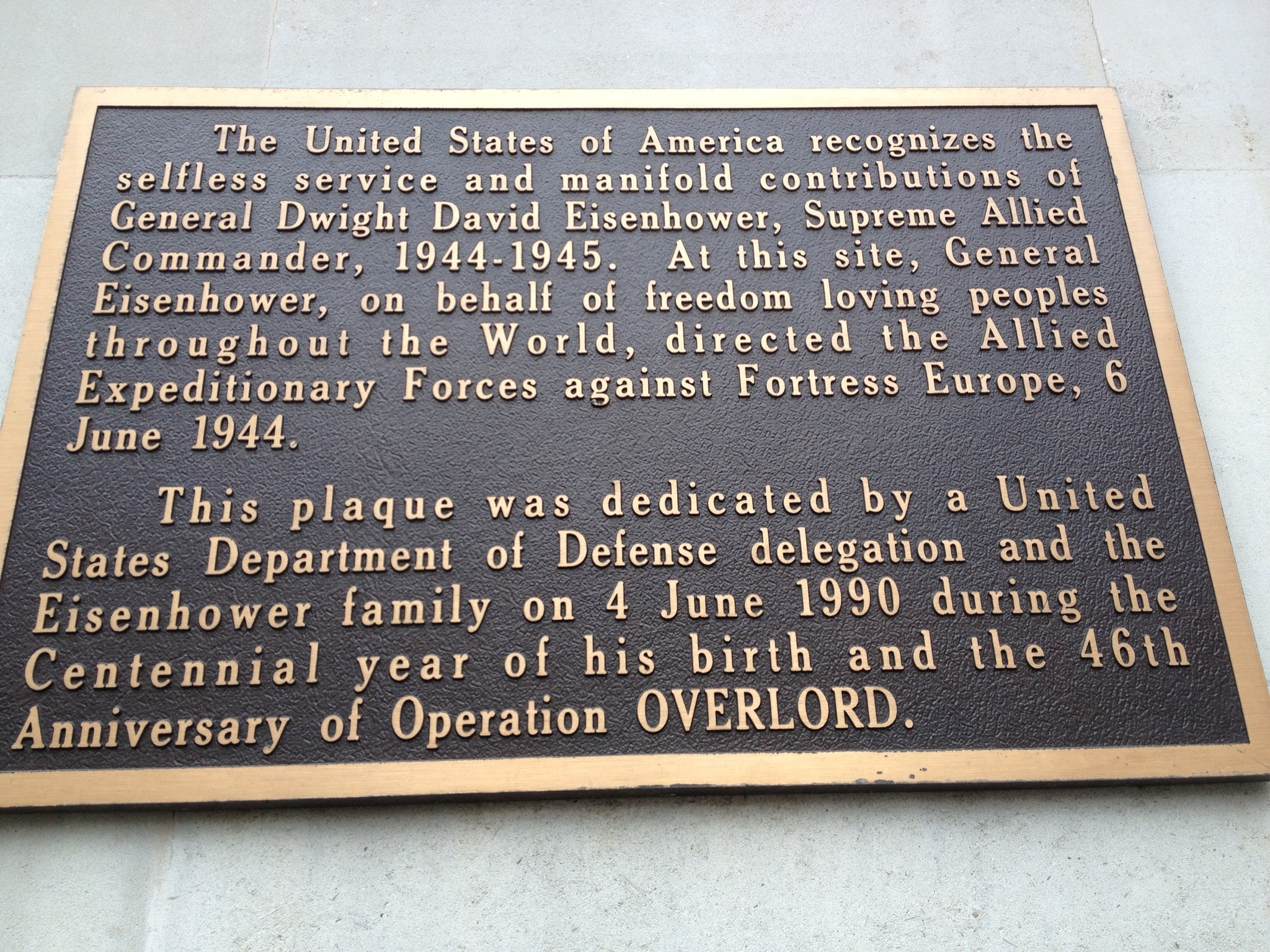
Plaque says: The United States of America recognizes the selfless service and manifold contributions of General Dwight David Eisenhower, Supreme Allied Commander, 1944–1945. At this site, General Eisenhower, on behalf of Freedom loving peoples throughout the World, directed the Allied Expeditionary Forces against Fortress Europe, 6 June 1944. This Plaque was dedicated by a United States Department of Defense delegation and the Eisenhower family on 4 June 1990 during the Centennial year of his birth and the 46th Anniversary of Operation Overlord.

== See also ==
- List of demolished buildings and structures in London
