= Sir Anselm Guise, 6th Baronet =

English soldier, landowner, and magistrate (1888-1970)

Sir Anselm William Edward Guise 6th Baronet

High Sheriff of Gloucestershire
- In office 1926–1926
- Preceded by: Philip Sidney Stott
- Succeeded by: Major Charles Penrhyn Ackers

Personal details
- Born: 18 September 1888 Elmore Court, Gloucestershire, England
- Died: 12 September 1970 (aged 81)
- Spouse: Nina Margaret Sophie Grant (m. 1924)
- Children: 3
- Parents: Sir William Francis George Guise (father); Ada Caroline Coope (mother)
- Education: Eton College
- Military career
- Allegiance: United Kingdom
- Branch: British Army
- Service years: 1914-1918
- Rank: Captain
- Unit: Gloucestershire Yeomanry
- Conflicts: World War I

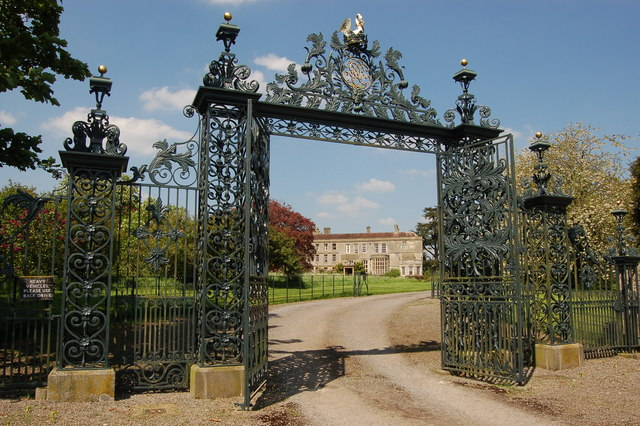
Elmore Court, seen through its main gates

Sir Anselm William Edward Guise, 6th Baronet (18 September 1888 – 12 September 1970) was an English soldier, landowner, and magistrate, of Elmore Court, Gloucester.

He was High Sheriff of Gloucestershire in 1926.

== Life ==
Guise was the son of Sir William Francis George Guise, 5th Baronet, by his marriage to Ada Caroline Coope, and was educated at Eton. During the First World War, he was commissioned into the Gloucestershire Yeomanry and rose to the rank of captain.

On 17 January 1920, he succeeded his father in the Guise baronetcy, created for an ancestor in 1783. His father left him an estate of 623 acres (252 ha), part of the manor of Elmore which in 1262 had been granted to their ancestor Anselm de Gyse by John of Burgh, a son of Hubert de Burgh, 1st Earl of Kent, after Anselm had married a cousin of Burgh's. Within a few months of inheriting the estate, Guise sold much of it, while keeping Elmore Court and a home farm, and also Lassington Wood, which he soon gave to Gloucester County Borough Council, to celebrate the Guise family's long association with the city.

Guise also inherited an art collection, and in 1921 he sold Francesco Botticini‘s painting “Madonna Adoring the Christ Child”, which had belonged to his mother's family, the Coopes.

In 1922 Guise was commissioned as a Justice of the Peace for Gloucestershire, and in 1926 was “pricked” (appointed) as High Sheriff of the county.

On 23 January 1924, Guise married Nina Margaret Sophie Grant, a daughter of Sir James Augustus Grant, first (and last) Baronet, and they had three children, Philippa Margaret (born 1926), John Grant (1927–2007), later 7th Baronet, and Christopher James Guise (born 1930), later 8th Baronet. Their daughter Philippa married Alastair Hugh Joseph Fraser, of Moniack Castle, the eldest son of Major Alastair Fraser and Lady Sibyl Grimston. Between 1951 and 1964 they had four sons and two daughters.

== Notes ==
Baronetage of Great Britain
Preceded by William Francis Guise	Baronet (of Highnam); 1920–1970	Succeeded by John Grant Guise
