= Guise (disambiguation) =

Guise is a commune in France. Guise may also refer to:

== People ==
- House of Guise, a French ducal family
- Counts and Dukes of Guise
- Guise baronets, baronetcies in England and Great Britain
- Guise (name), a list of people with the surname
- Guise Brittan (1809–1876), New Zealand farmer and politician

== Military ==
- Battle of St. Quentin (1914), also known as the First Battle of Guise, a World War I battle between the French and the invading Germans
- Second Battle of Guise, part of the Battle of the Sambre (1918)
- BAP Guise (DD-72), a Peruvian Navy destroyer
- BAP Guise (CC-28), a Peruvian Navy corvette

== Other uses ==
- Canton of Guise, France, which includes the commune
- Guise dancing, a folk practice in Cornwall
- Guise, one of the houses of Markham College

== See also ==
- Aspley Guise, a village in England
- Guises Beach, Saskatchewan]]
