= Gilliflower =

English flower

Gilliflower or gillyflower
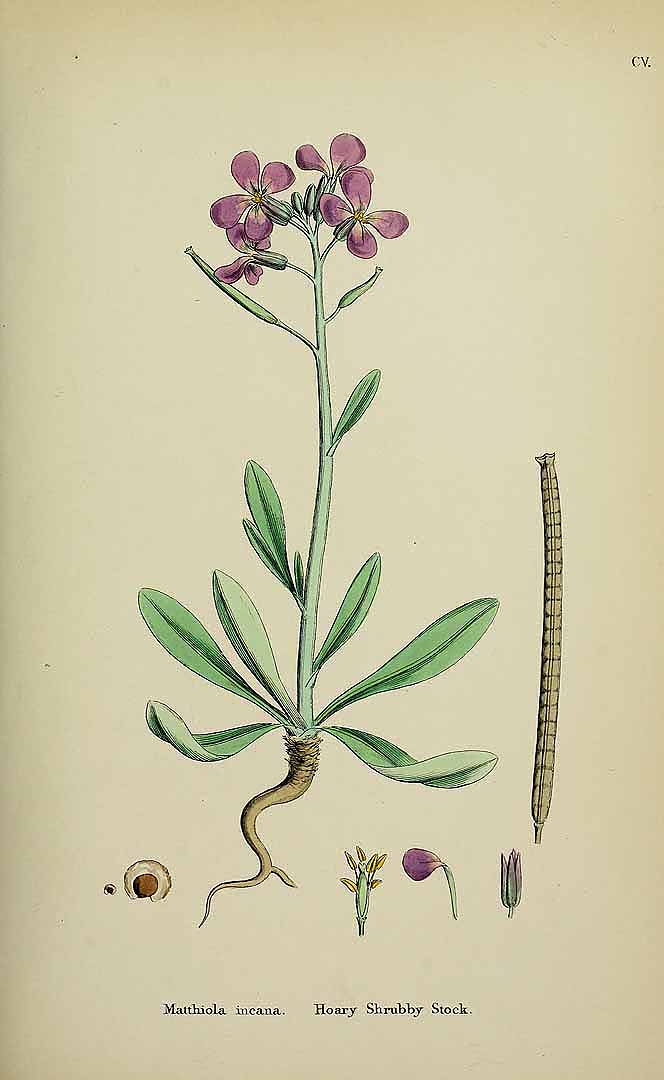
- From English botany, or coloured figures of British plants, ed. 3, vol. 1: t. 105 (1863)

A gilliflower or gillyflower (/ˈdʒɪliˌflaʊ.ər/) is generally a plant of the genus Dianthus, especially the clove pink or carnation Dianthus caryophyllus, but can also refer to the stock Matthiola incana, or other plants such as the wallflower which have similarly fragrant flowers. The name derives from the French giroflée from Greek karyophyllon = "nut-leaf" = the spice called clove, the association deriving from the flower's scent.

Gilliflowers were allegedly referenced as payment for peppercorn rent in medieval feudal-tenure contracts. For example, in 1262 in Bedfordshire a tenant held an area of land called The Hyde "for the rent of one clove of gilliflower", and Elmore Court in Gloucester was granted to the Guise family by John De Burgh for the rent of "The clove of one Gillyflower" each year. In Kent in the 13th century Bartholomew de Badlesmere upon an exchange made between King Edward I and himself, received a royal grant in fee of a manor and chapel, to hold in socage, "by the service of paying one pair of clove gilliflowers", by the hands of the Sheriff. However, it is more likely that the rent was paid in the form of actual cloves (in Latin, gariofilum; the flower was later named after the spice, via French), cloves and peppercorns both being exotic spices.

An old recipe for gilliflower wine is mentioned in the Cornish Recipes Ancient & Modern dated to 1753: "To 3 gallons water put 6lbs of the best powder sugar; boil together for the space of 1/2 an hour; keep skimming; let it stand to cool. Beet up 3 ounces of syrup of betony, with a large spoonful of ale yeast, put into liquor & brew it well; put a peck of gilliflowers free of stalks; let work fore 3 days covered with a cloth; strain & cask for 3-4 weeks, then bottle."

== In popular culture ==
A rose and a gillyflower appear on the station badge of RAF Waterbeach in Cambridgeshire, and subsequently on the badge of 39 Engineer Regiment based at Waterbeach Barracks.

A rose and gillyflower were demanded by the owner of the land on which Waterbeach Abbey was built, in the 12th century.

Gilliflowers are mentioned by Mrs. Lovett in the song "Wait" from the Sondheim musical Sweeney Todd.

They appear in the novel La Faute de l'Abbé Mouret (aka Abbe Mouret's Transgression or the Sin of the Father Mouret) by Émile Zola as part of the Les Rougon-Macquart series.

Charles Ryder calls them gillyflowers, and they grow under his student window at Oxford in the novel Brideshead Revisited.

== Gallery ==
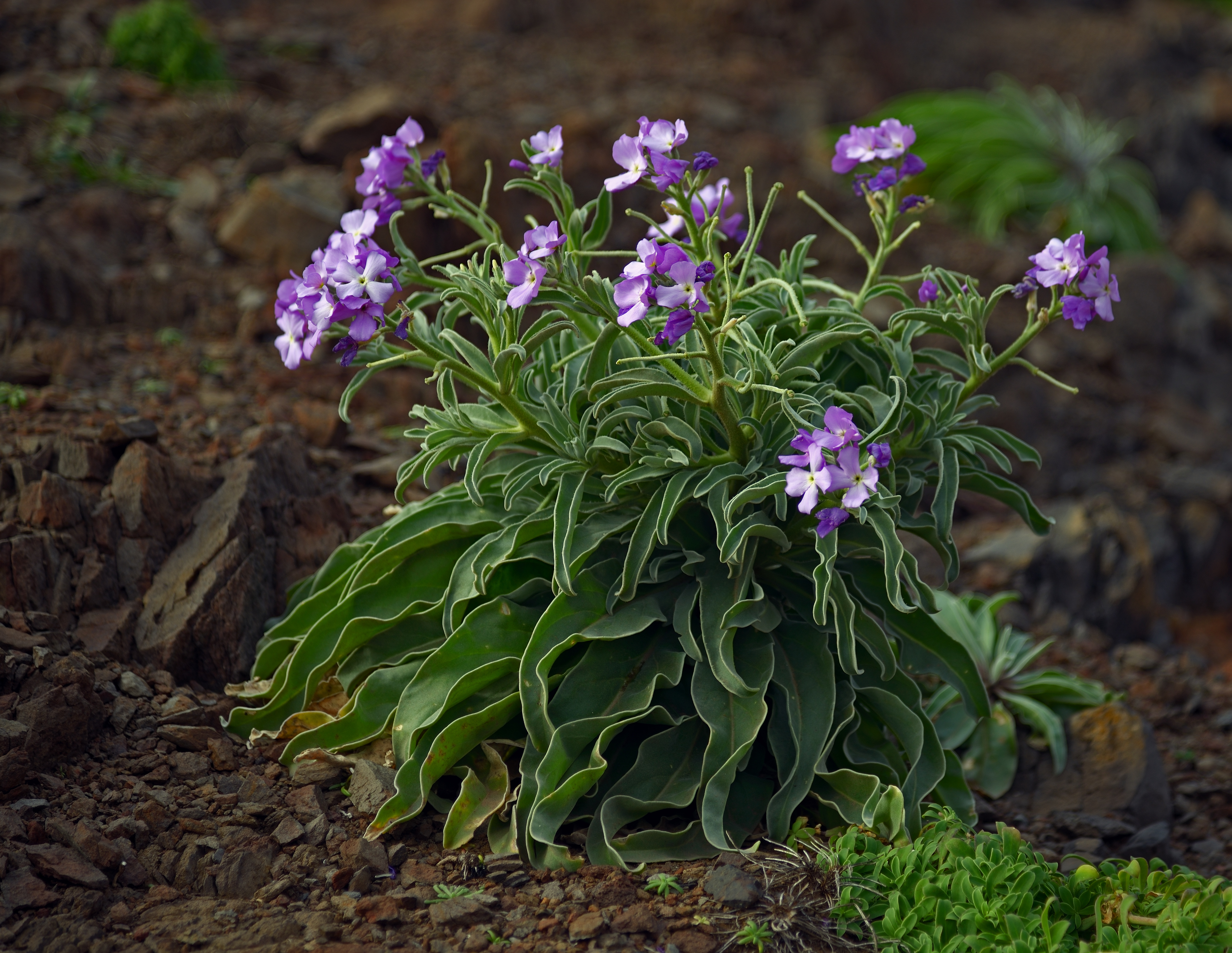
Matthiola incana. Madeira, Portugal

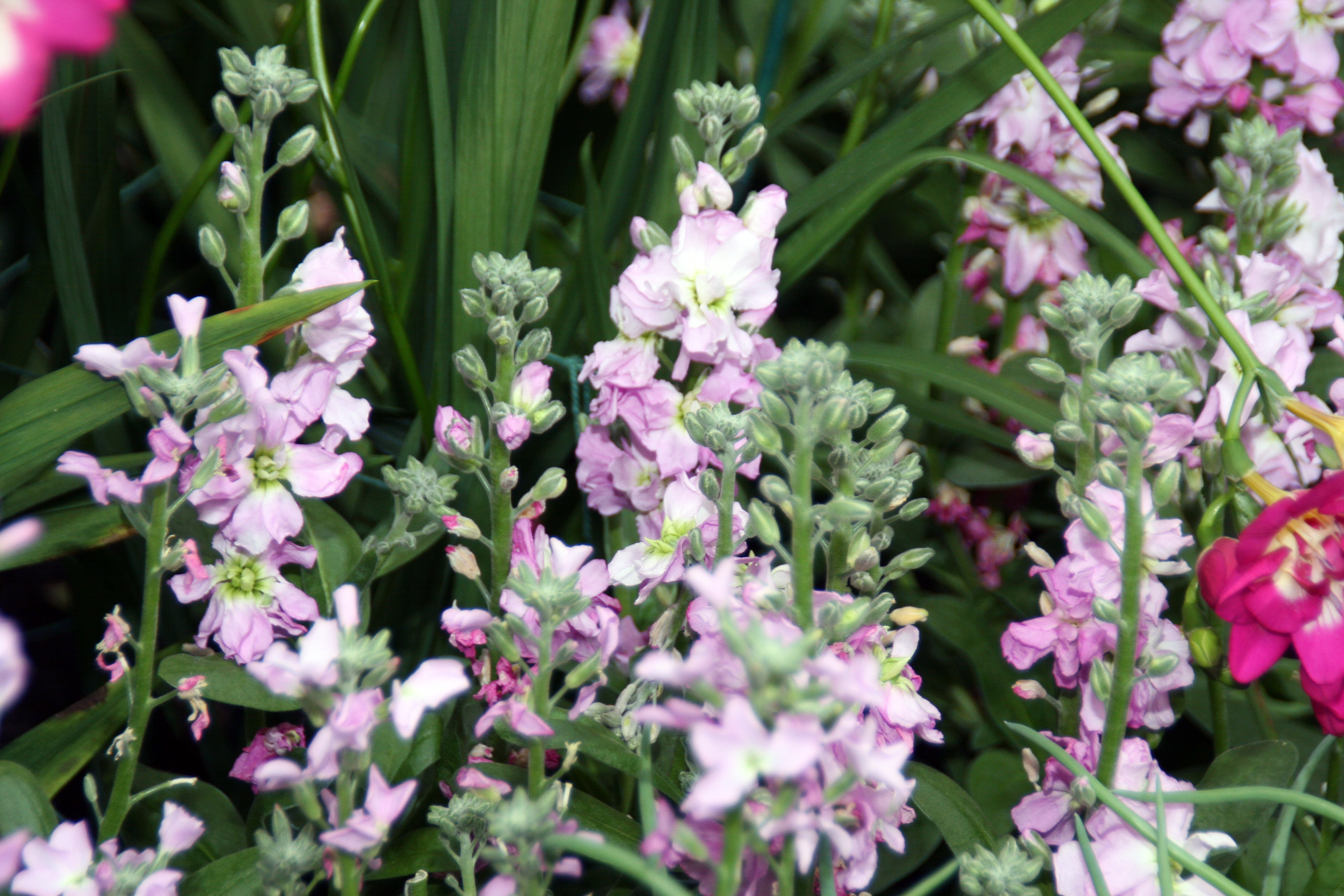
"Vintage Lilac," Brookside Gardens, Maryland

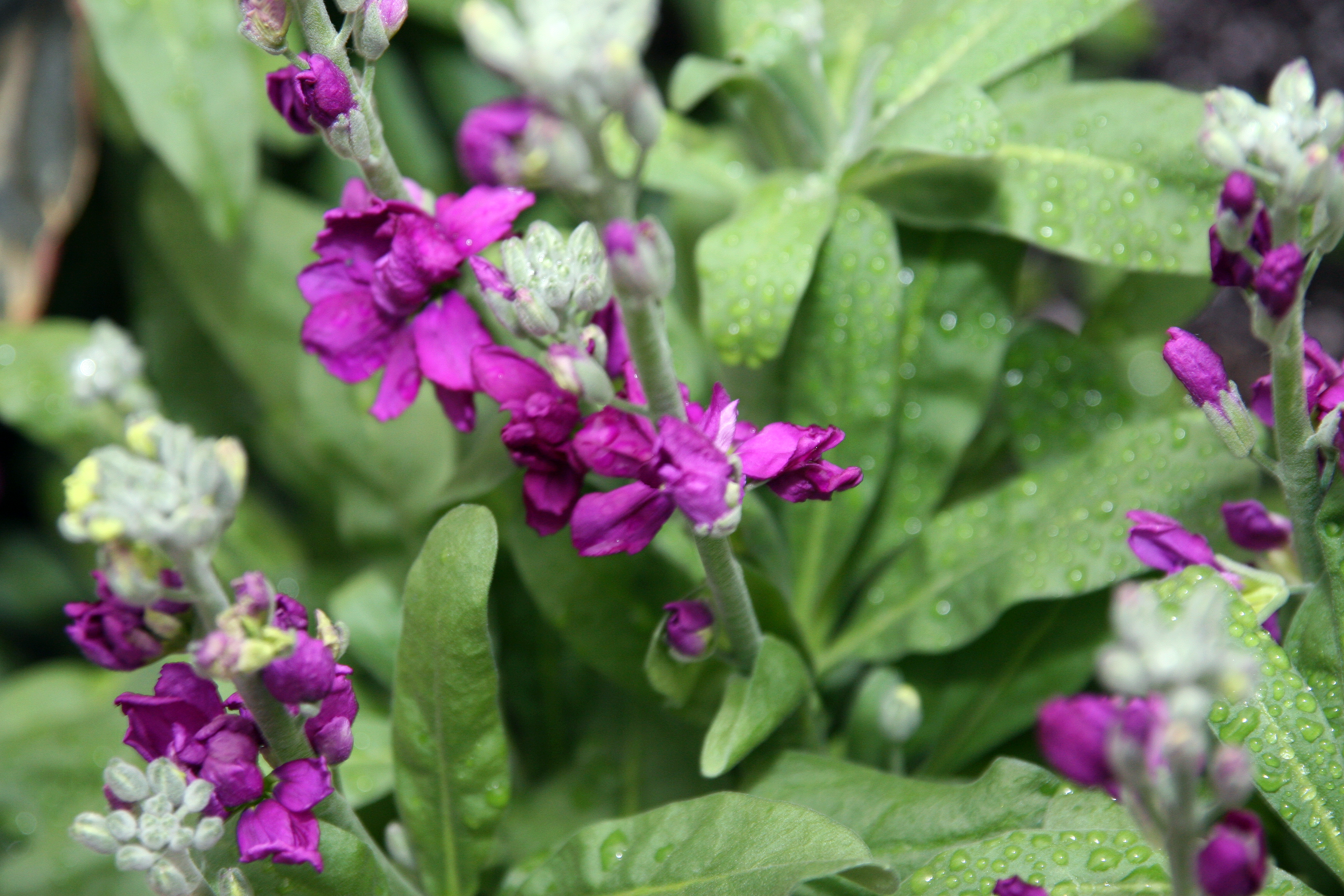
"Vintage Burgundy," Brookside Gardens, Maryland

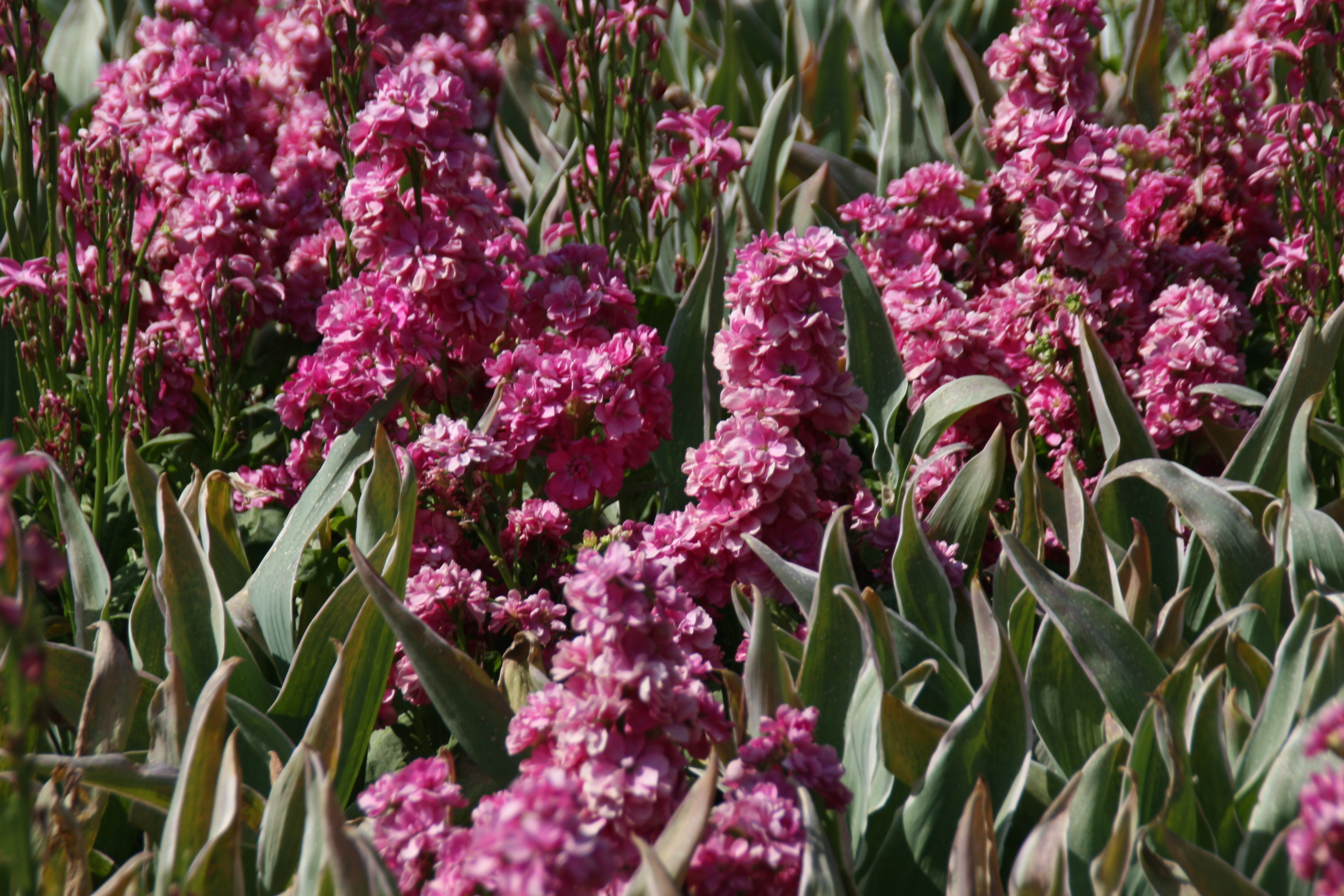
"Harmony Light Rose," Longwood Gardens, Pennsylvania

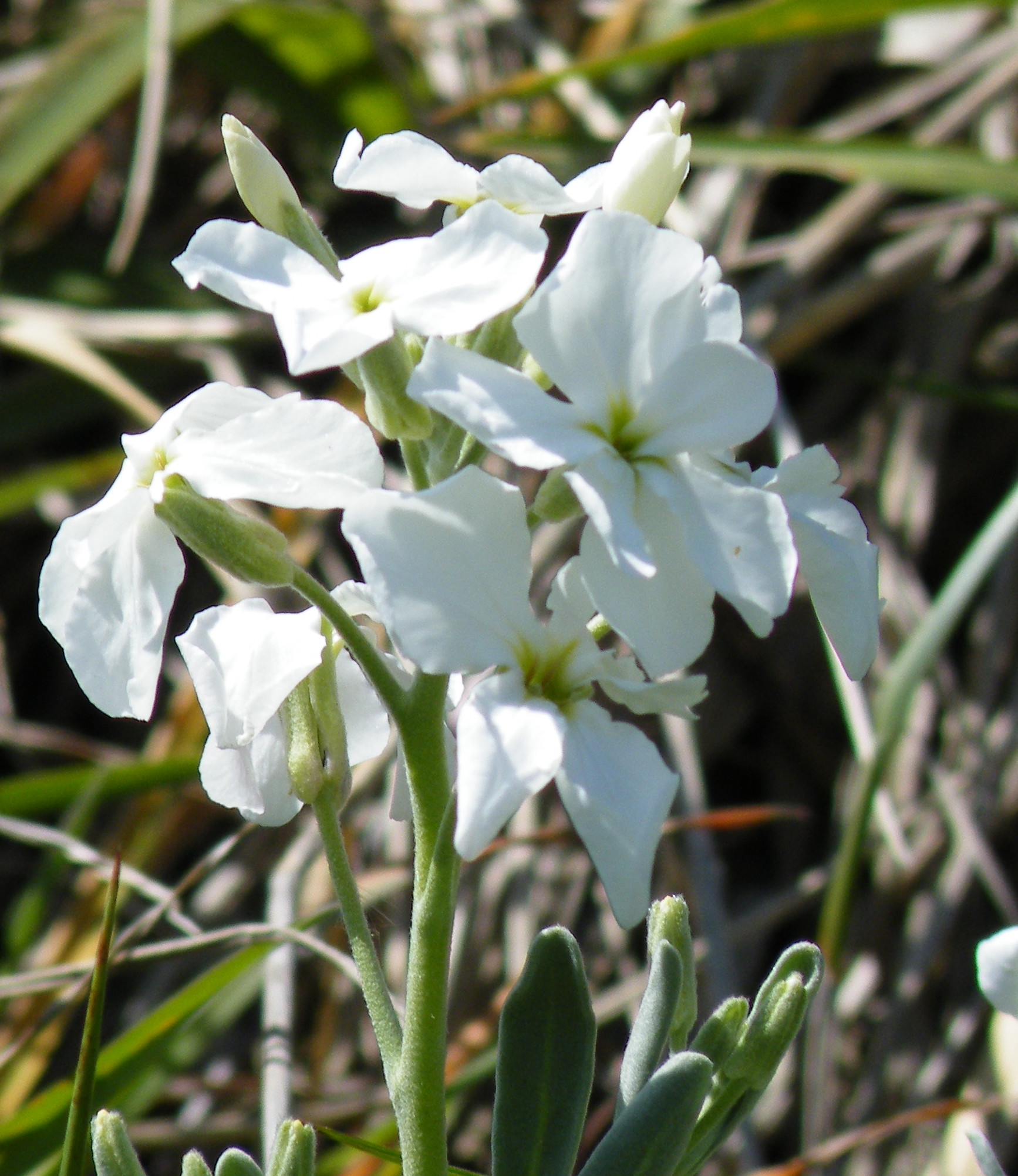
"Hoary stock," East Sussex, England

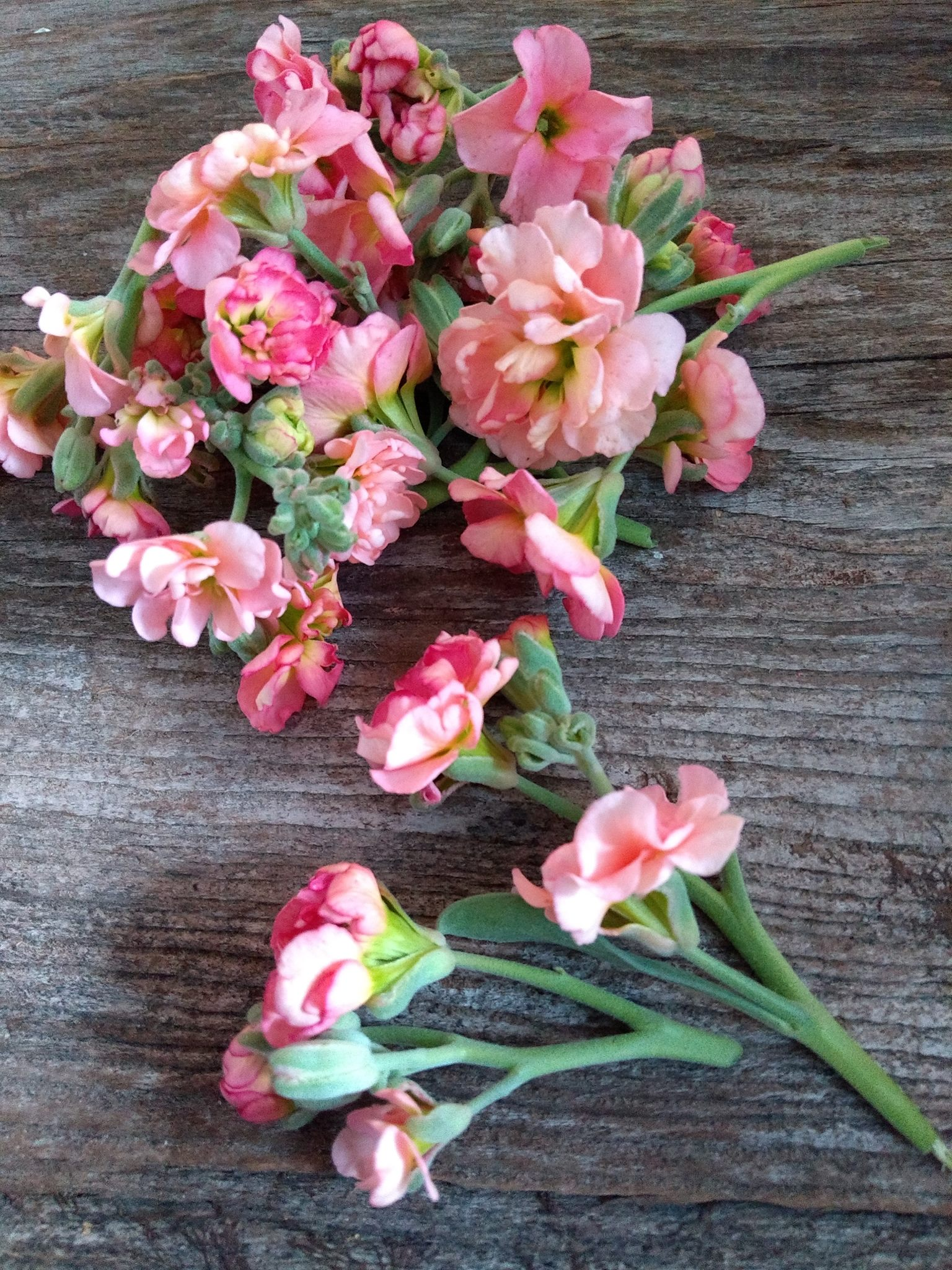
"Peach stock"
