= Mademoiselle de Guise =

Mademoiselle de Guise may refer to:

- Mary of Guise (1515–1560) mother of Mary, Queen of Scots.
- Catherine of Lorraine (1552–1596) daughter of Francis of Lorraine, Duke of Guise and Anne d'Este, wife of Louis, Duke of Montpensier.
- Louise Marguerite of Lorraine (1588–1631) daughter of Henri, Duke of Guise and Catherine of Cleves, wife of François, Prince of Conti.
- Marie of Lorraine, Duchess of Guise (1615–1688) daughter of Charles of Lorraine, Duke of Guise and Henriette Catherine de Joyeuse.
- Louise Henriette Françoise of Lorraine (1707–1737) daughter of Anne, Count of Harcourt and Marie Louise Jeannin de Castille, wife of Emmanuel Théodose de La Tour d'Auvergne, Duke of Bouillon.
