= Sir John Guise, 4th Baronet =

English Whig politician

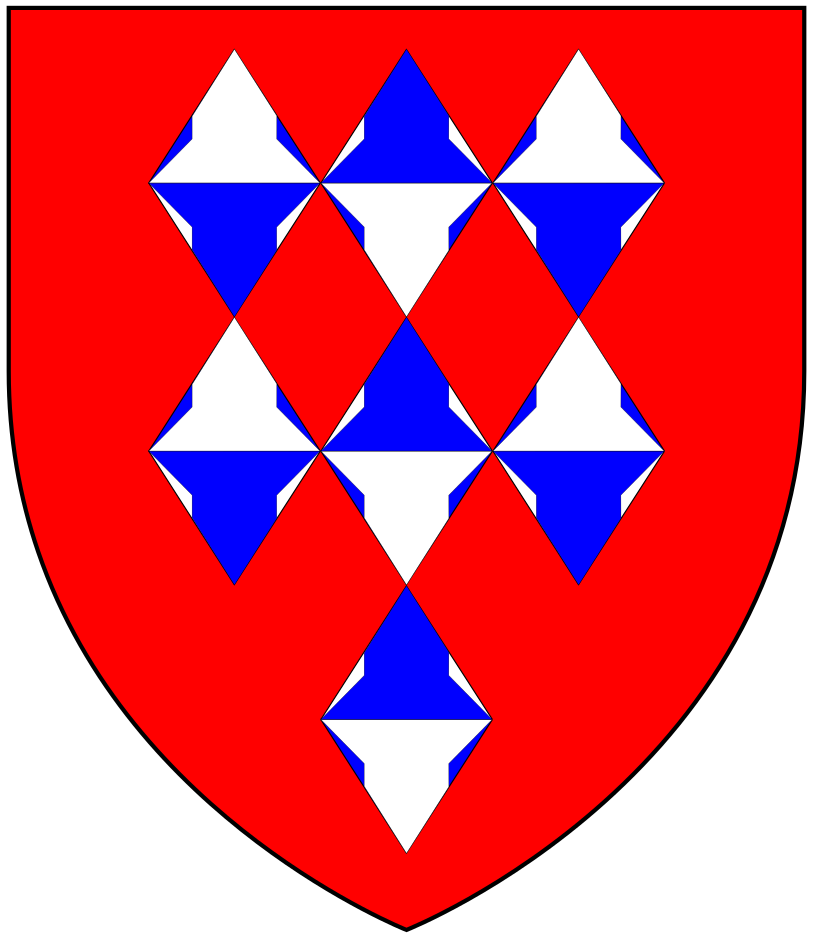
Arms of Guise: Gules, seven lozenges conjoined vairé three, three and one

Sir John Guise, 4th Baronet (1701 – May 1769), of Elmore Court and Rendcomb, both in Gloucestershire, England, was an English Whig politician who sat in the House of Commons from 1722 to 1727.

== Early life ==
Guise was the only surviving son of Sir John Guise, 3rd Baronet and his first wife. He was educated at Marlborough between 1709 and 1711 and matriculated at New College, Oxford on 27 June 1720, aged 19.

== Career ==
Guise was returned as a Whig Member of Parliament for Aylesbury at the 1722 British general election. There is no record of a vote by him. He lost his seat at the 1727 British general election to a follower of Walpole. He stood at a by-election for Great Marlow in 1731, where his father had an electoral interest but was defeated and did not stand again.

== Later life and legacy ==
Guise married Jane Saunders, the only daughter of John Saunders of Mongewell, Oxfordshire, by a settlement dated 14 June 1732. He succeeded his father in the baronetcy on 16 November 1732. In 1735 he sold the Marlow estates to Sir William Clayton. He was sometime a colonel in the guards.

Guise died in May 1769 and was buried at Rendcomb, leaving two sons William and John and two daughters. He was succeeded in the baronetcy by his son William.

Parliament of Great Britain
Preceded by Trevor Hill; Nathaniel Mead	Member of Parliament for Aylesbury; 1722–1727; With: Richard Abell	Succeeded by Sir William Stanhope; Philip Lloyd
Baronetage of England
Preceded by John Guise	Baronet (of Elmore); 1732–1769	Succeeded by William Guise
