= General Guise =

General Guise may refer to:

- John Guise (British Army officer) (1683–1765), British Army lieutenant general
- John Christopher Guise (1826–1895), British Army lieutenant general
- John Wright Guise (1777–1865), British Army general

== See also ==
- Samuel Guise-Moores (1863–1942), British Army major general
