= John Symes Berkeley =

English politician (1663–1736)

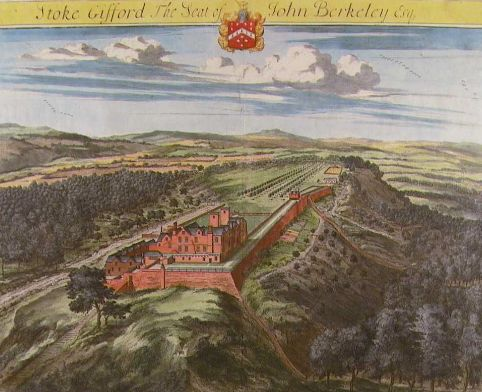
Stoke Gifford Hall (later "Stoke Park"), as re-built in 1533 by Sir Richard Berkeley (1531–1604). Drawn by Johannes Kip in 1707, when it belonged to John Symes Berkeley, Esquire, as stated by the caption above which displays the arms of Berkeley of Stoke Gifford. Published in Britannia Illustrata, 1724 edition

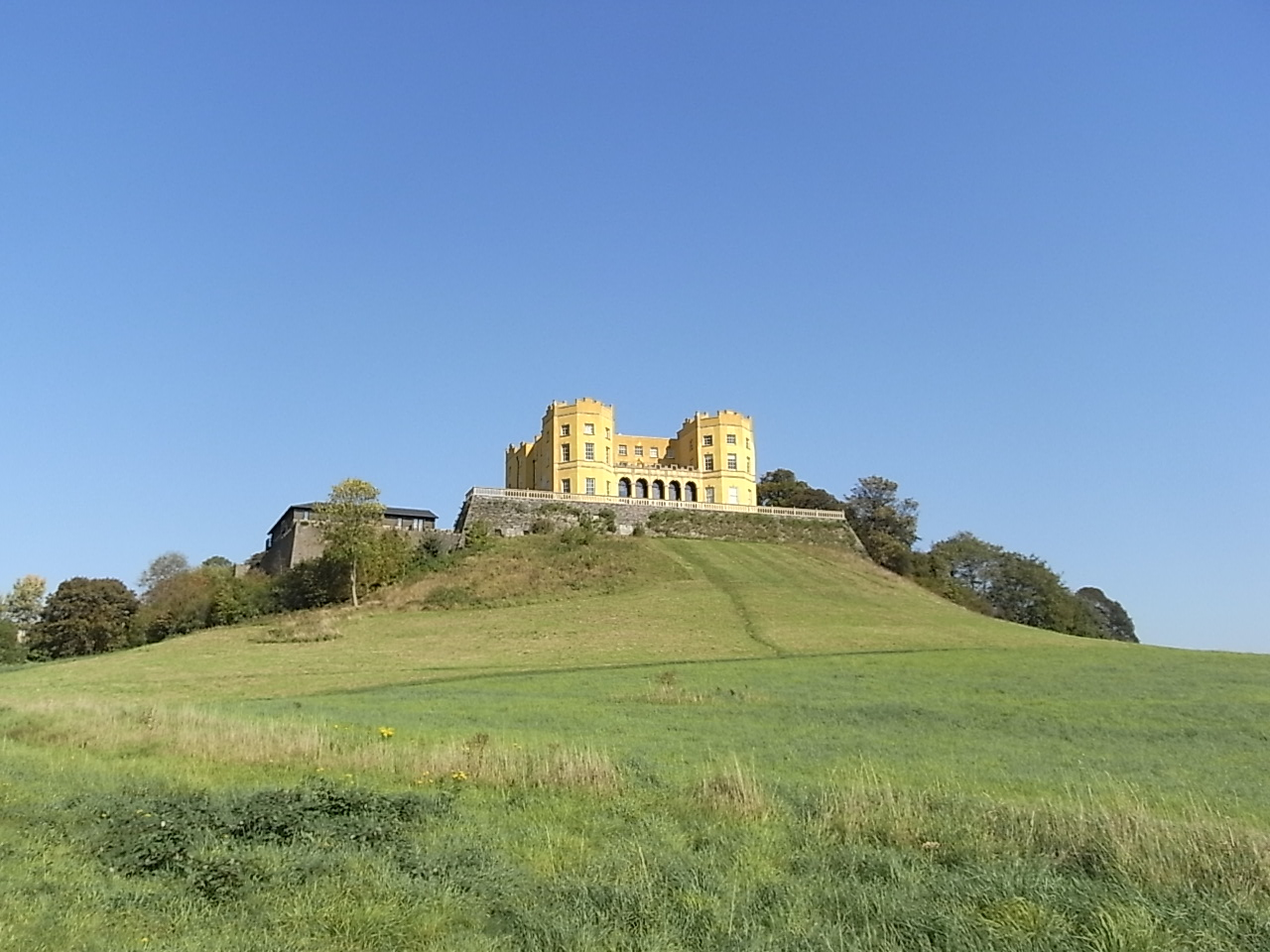
Stoke Park House, now known as the Dower House, as re-built in 1750 by Norborne Berkeley, 4th Baron Botetourt

John Symes Berkeley (1663–1736) of Stoke Gifford near Bristol was an English Member of Parliament.

== Life ==
He was the second son of Richard Berkeley (d. 1671) of Stoke Gifford and Jane, daughter of Henry Symes of Frampton Cotterell, Gloucestershire. His grandfather and great-grandfather had both sat in parliament for Gloucestershire before the English Civil War. He inherited the family estates on the death of his elder brother George in 1685. This included Stoke Park, where he later exploited the rich coal deposits beneath the estate and commissioned Sir James Thornhill to rebuild a summerhouse at the end of the terrace of Stoke Park House as an orangery.

He was twice elected to represent the constituency of Gloucestershire in the Parliament between 1710 and 1715.

He died at Bath in 1736 and was buried at Stoke Gifford.

== Family ==
In 1695 he married Susan (d. 1696), the daughter and heiress of Sir Thomas Fowles and the widow of Jonathan Cope. In 1717 he married Elizabeth, the daughter and coheiress of Walter Norborne of Calne, Wiltshire and widow of Edward Devereux, 8th Viscount Hereford, with whom he had a son, Norborne Berkeley, 4th Baron Botetourt, a future Governor of Virginia and a daughter, Elizabeth (Duchess of Beaufort), the wife of Charles Somerset, 4th Duke of Beaufort of Badminton House in Gloucestershire. On Norborne's death in Virginia, Stoke Park House passed to Elizabeth, then Dowager Duchess, and became the Dower House of the Dukes Beaufort.
