= Maynard Colchester =

English lawyer and politician

Colonel Maynard Colchester (4 March 1665 – 1715), of Westbury Court and the Wilderness, was an English lawyer and politician who sat in the English and British House of Commons from 1701 to 1708.

Colchester was the eldest son of Sir Duncombe Colchester of Westbury Court and the Wilderness and his wife Elizabeth Maynard, daughter of Sir John Maynard. He matriculated at Exeter College, Oxford in 1681 and was admitted at Middle Temple in 1682. In 1689, he was called to the bar. He married Jane Clarke (died 1741), daughter of Sir Edward Clarke of St. Peter Cheap and Gutter Lane, London, on 28 January 1690. He succeeded his father in 1694. In 1697 he was Colonel of the Red Regiment of Gloucestershire Militia at St Briavels.

Colchester was appointed Commissioner for superstitious lands, Gloucestershire in 1692. He was a member of SPCK in 1699, and was one of the founding members of the Society of the Propagation of the Gospel in 1701. He was elected Member of Parliament for Gloucestershire at the second general election of 1701. He was re-elected at the general elections of 1702 and 1705. He did not stand in 1708. He was appointed verderer of the Forest of Dean from about 1709 for the rest of his life. In 1710 he became deputy constable of St Briavels Castle, Gloucestershire.

Colchester died on 25 June 1715, and was buried at Westbury, Gloucestershire. His tomb was sculpted by Thomas Green of Camberwell.

His two sons predeceased him and a daughter Jane married Thomas Morgan of Ruperra, Glamorgan. She inherited the estates of her uncle Thomas Clarke.
