= Sir John Guise, 2nd Baronet =

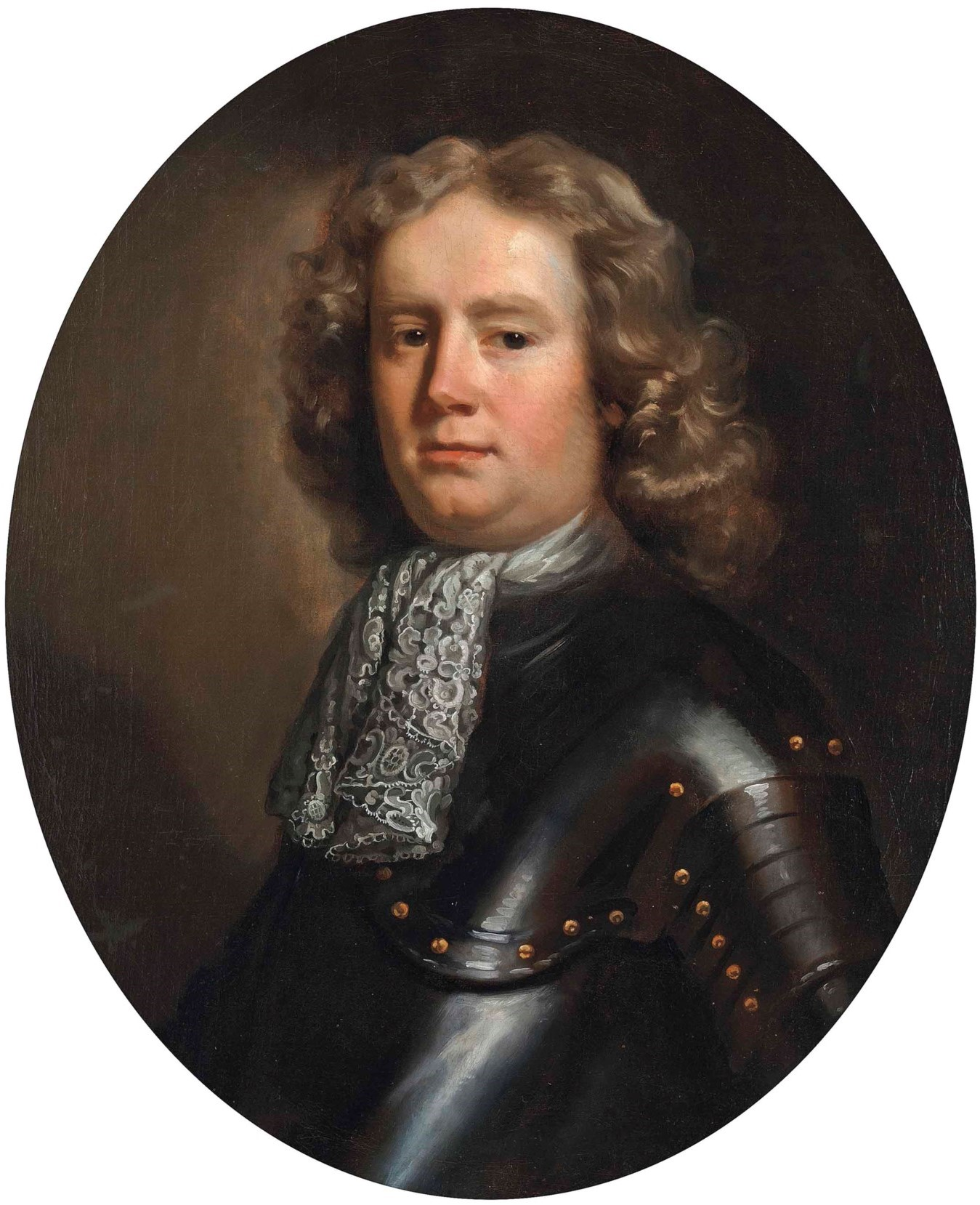
Portrait of Sir John Guise, 2nd Baronet of Elmore painted by John Riley

Sir John Guise, 2nd Baronet (c.1654 – November 1695) of Elmore Court, Gloucestershire was an English landowner and Member of Parliament.

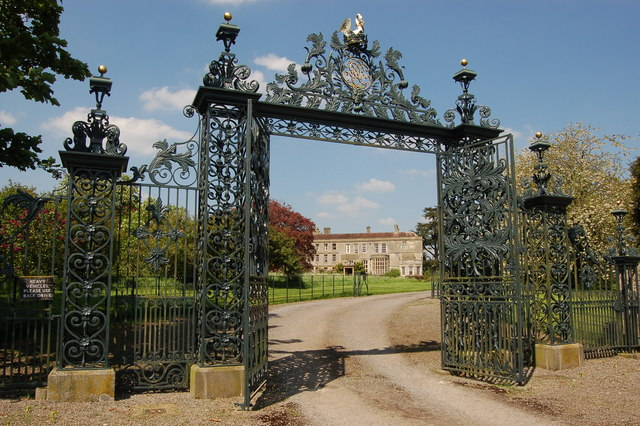
Elmore Court, Gloucestershire

== Life ==
He was born the only son of Sir Christopher Guise, 1st Baronet of the Elmore baronets of Gloucestershire and educated at Christ Church, Oxford, where he matriculated in 1669. He then travelled in France for a while. He succeeded his father to the baronetcy and to Elmore Court in 1670.

He acted as a local Justice of the Peace and as a Deputy-Lieutenant of Gloucestershire (?1674-81, 1689-death). He was Mayor of Gloucester for 1690–91 and Vice-Admiral of Gloucestershire from 1691 to his death.

He was elected the Member of Parliament for Gloucestershire in February 1679, August 1679 and 1681 but defeated in the election of 1685 by the Court party candidate and forced to take refuge in the Netherlands. He returned in 1688 with William of Orange and then took part in the capture of Bristol as Colonel of a foot regiment. Re-elected for Gloucestershire to the Convention Parliament of 1689 he was an active member, serving on many committees. Re-elected again in 1690 and 1695 he died in office shortly after his final election.

== Private life ==
In 1674, Sir John married Elizabeth, the daughter of John Grobham Howe of Little Compton, Withington, Gloucestershire, a previous MP for the county. He and Elizabeth had a son, John, and two daughters, Annabella and one younger. He died of smallpox in November 1695 and was buried in St John the Baptist church, Elmore. He was succeeded by his son.

Baronetage of England
Preceded by Christopher Guise	Baronet (of Elmore); 1670–1695	Succeeded by John Guise
