= Elmore Court =

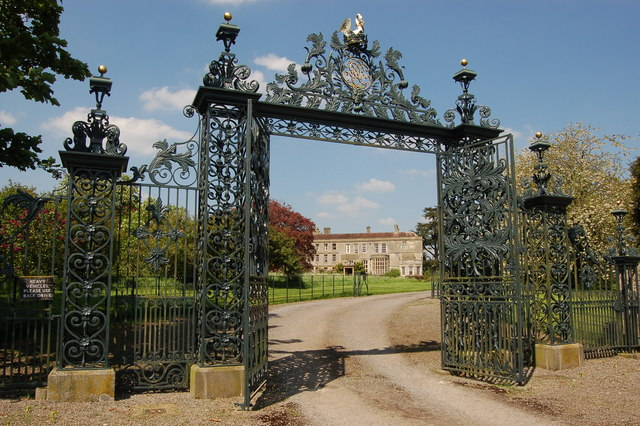
- Elmore Court

- Location within Gloucestershire

General information
- Type: Mansion
- Location: Elmore, Gloucestershire, Elmore, England
- Coordinates: 51.836°N 2.317°W
- Owner: Sir Anselm Guise, 9th Baronet

Elmore Court is a grade II* listed mansion, located at Elmore in the Stroud district of Gloucestershire, England. The original building dates from between 1564 and 1588.

== History ==
The property has been the family seat of the Guise baronets for nearly 800 years. It was first granted by John of Burgh, who was part of the court of Henry III, with the rent set at "One clove of Gillyflower" each year. The current house was built between 1564 and 1588, and it was altered during the 18th and 19th centuries.

The Guise Mausoleum, built in 1733, is in the churchyard of St John the Baptist, the local church.

The Guise family was non-resident from about 1685 to about 1845, when Sir John Wright Guise, 3rd Baronet, took up residence. The house had been used as a school from 1778, originally under the Revd. Charles Bishop (died 1788), and later under the Carveth family until about 1830. Its most distinguished pupil was the future surgeon William Lawrence.

From 1921 until 1970, the home was owned by Sir Anselm Guise, 6th Baronet. The current owner, Sir Anselm Guise, 9th Baronet, inherited the estate in 2007 from his uncle, the 7th Baronet, with the baronetcy going first to Anselm's father, Sir Christopher James Guise, 8th Baronet (1930–2022).

In 2008 and 2011, Elmore Court was the subject of a Channel 4 television programme presented by hotelier Ruth Watson as part of her Country House Rescue series.

In February 2013, Anselm Guise's plans for a sustainable new wedding reception venue called The Gillyflower at Elmore Court featured in the BBC2 TV programme, Permission Impossible: Britain's Planners. Elmore Court and The Gillyflower opened for weddings and events in November 2013.

Rewilding began in 2020 with 250 acres of the estate, regenerative farming began in 2022 through a collaboration with Wildfarmed, and the building of treehouses overlooking revived wetlands will be complete in 2023.

== Architecture ==
The two and three-storey limestone building consists of a central hall with cross-wings. The centre of the front of the building has a 19th-century porch with Doric columns.

The wrought iron gates at the entrance of the driveway are 300 years old and originally sited at Rendcomb.

The walls to the south of the main building were constructed in the early 18th century.
