= Guise baronets =

Set index for Guise baronets

There have been two baronetcies created for the Guise family, one in the Baronetage of England and one in the Baronetage of Great Britain. As of 2026 the latter creation is extant. The family surname is pronounced "Guys", as in the "Guy's" of "Guy's Hospital".

- Guise baronets of Elmore (1661)
- Guise baronets of Highnam (1783)
