= Westonbirt (disambiguation) =

Westonbirt is a village in the parish of Westonbirt with Lasborough, Gloucestershire, England.

Westonbirt may also refer to the following places in that parish:

- Westonbirt Arboretum
- Westonbirt House, a country house
- Westonbirt School, which now occupies the house
