= Lasborough Park =

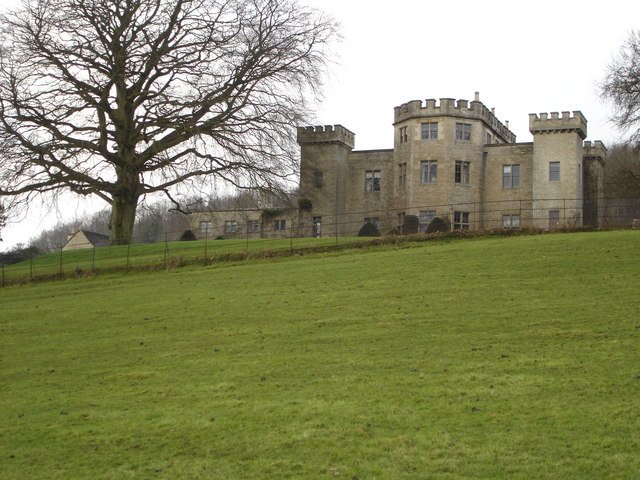
- Lasborough Park

- Location in Gloucestershire
- 51°38′32″N 02°15′48″W
- Location: Tetbury, Gloucestershire, England

Lasborough Park (or Lasborough House) is a Grade II listed country house in Newington Bagpath/Lasborough, Tetbury, Gloucestershire, England. The estate includes a medieval manor, a house, and parkland. The original medieval manor, Lasborough Farm, dates to the 11th century, and included terraced gardens. A manor house is record in the 14th century. The manor was surrounded by woodland and a deer park. Lasborough House and its pleasure grounds was built in 1794.

In the mid 17th century, the Lasborough manor was made up of two farms which were worked by tenant farmers, that of Lasborough Park and also Bowldown Farm. Lasborough Farm had an old manor-house. The country house Lasborough Park was built in 1794 for Edmund Estcourt by James Wyatt in Tudor Gothic style. In the early 1870s, Lasborough Park was owned by Robert Stayner Holford of Westonbirt House. The house was enlarged and altered in the 19th century. It was later purchased by Galbraith Cole. In 1929, the house was purchased by Maj. R. A. Scott who held it until 1950. It passed to a timber merchant firm in 1952 who cut down trees on the property. In 1954, it was purchased by W. Curtis and the old manor-house was sold off.

The Middle Avon River rises at two heads; one in Newington Bagpath, which passes through Lasborough Park to Boxwell; the, other in Hawkesbury, which passes by Wickwar. The streams unite below Kingswood, county of Wiltshire.
