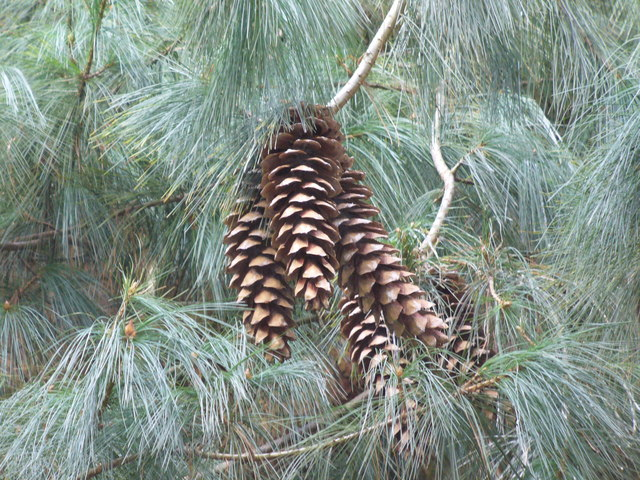
- Cones

Scientific classification
- Kingdom: Plantae
- Clade: Tracheophytes
- Clade: Gymnosperms
- Division: Pinophyta
- Class: Pinopsida
- Order: Pinales
- Family: Pinaceae
- Genus: Pinus
- Species: P. × holfordiana

Binomial name
- Pinus × holfordiana A.B.Jacks.

= Pinus × holfordiana =

- At RHS Garden Wisley

Species of plant

Pinus × holfordiana, the Holford pine, is an artificial hybrid species in the family Pinaceae. It arose spontaneously from crosses of Pinus veitchii (the seed parent, from Mexico) and P. wallichiana (the pollen parent, from the Himalayas) growing on the grounds of Westonbirt House, England, and is named for George Holford, the owner. A fast-growing evergreen tree reaching 27 m (90 ft), it is valued for its bluish-green needles and bright brownish-orange bark, and is recommended for "architectural" and informal applications.
