= Westonbirt =

Village in Gloucestershire, England

Coordinates: 51.6019°N 2.2225°W

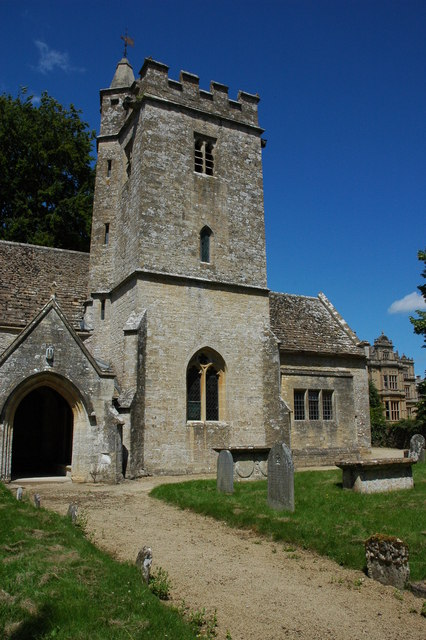
- Westonbirt Church

- Location within Gloucestershire
- Civil parish: Westonbirt with Lasborough
- District: Cotswold
- Shire county: Gloucestershire
- Region: South West
- Country: England
- Sovereign state: United Kingdom
- Post town: Tetbury
- Postcode district: GL8
- Police: Gloucestershire
- Fire: Gloucestershire
- Ambulance: South Western
- UK Parliament: South Cotswolds

Westonbirt is a village in the civil parish of Westonbirt with Lasborough, in the district of Cotswold, in the county of Gloucestershire, England.

== History ==
Westonbirt was recorded in the Domesday Book as Westone.

== See also ==
- Westonbirt House, a country house in Westonbirt
- Westonbirt School, which now occupies the house
- Westonbirt Arboretum
