= Susannah Holford =

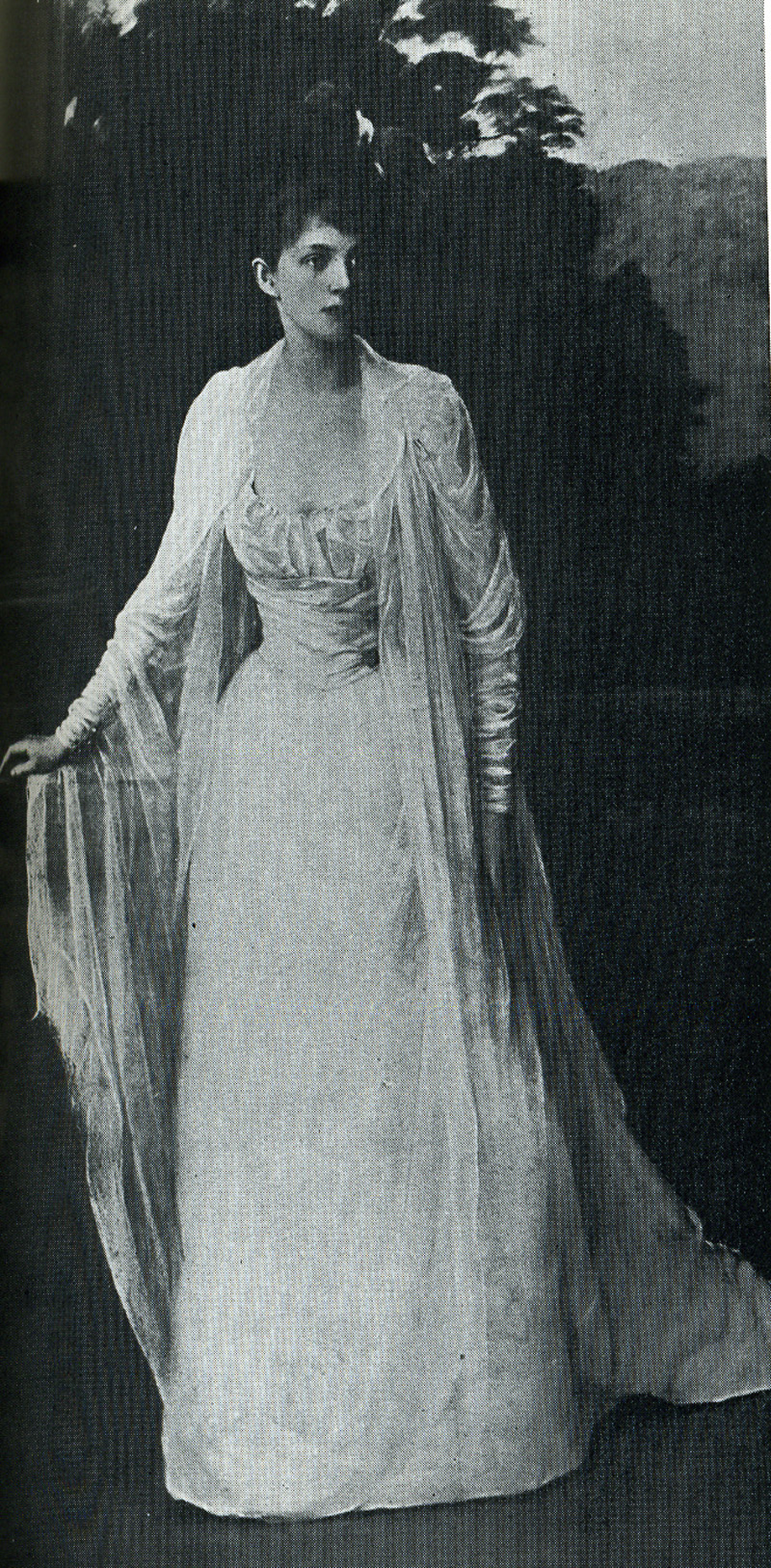
Lady Holford (née Wilson) circa 1885

Susannah West Holford, Lady Holford (née Wilson; 15 May 1864 – 18 December 1943) was an English socialite. She was the daughter of Arthur and Mary Wilson of Tranby Croft, Yorkshire. Her second husband was Sir George Holford who owned Dorchester House in London, Westonbirt House in Gloucestershire, and Westonbirt Arboretum which is still enjoyed by the public today.

== Early life ==
Susannah was the eldest child of Arthur and Mary Wilson who between 1864 and 1876 had seven children. The Wilsons were a wealthy family who had made their money from a shipping line, Thomas Wilson Sons & Co., founded by Susannah's grandfather Thomas in about 1840. Arthur with his brother inherited the firm and continued to manage and develop it. Soon after Susannah was born the Wilsons went to live at Wolfreton Grange, Kirk Ella in the East Riding of Yorkshire. In 1874 the building of Tranby Croft near Hull began and in 1876 the family moved into their new home.

Her childhood appears to have been carefree and filled with the activities of wealthy British families. She was taught to ride and hunt at an early age as her father was involved in this sport and became later the Master of the Holderness Hunt. She was also involved in amateur dramatic productions. In 1882 when she was about 18 she was in a Gilbert and Sullivan production of Patience which was performed at Tranby Croft. A programme of the play shows that she played the part of Lady Angela.

In about 1880, James Sant, a popular British painter, was commissioned to paint the two eldest Wilson girls. The portrait was entitled "Portrait of the Misses Wilson of Tranby Croft in pale blue satin dresses in a garden". Susannah is on the right and her sister Ethel on the left.

Susannah Wilson 1871; later Lady Holford	Tranby Croft where the Wilson family moved in 1874 (from a 1920s postcard)	Lady Holford (then Susannah Wilson)(right) and her sister Ethel in a portrait painted by James Sant circa 1880

== First marriage ==
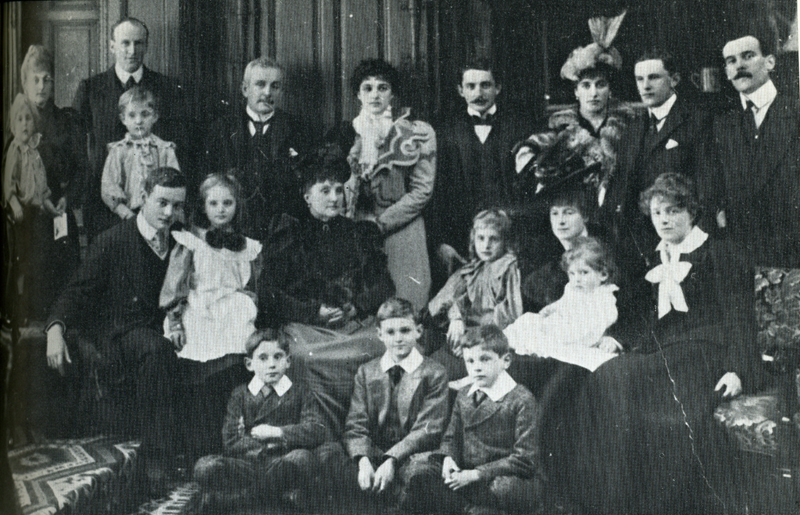
Jack Menzies is standing on the far right. Stewart Menzies is in the front row on the left and Keith is on the extreme right circa 1895.

Susannah married John Graham Menzies (Jack) in 1887. Their wedding was a lavish affair and is described below.

"The Bridal procession left Tranby Croft at 2.15 pm and all the way to the church the bridal party was cheered by crowds which packed the pavement every inch of the way. Tottie (Susannah) who had a sweet face and gentle expression wore the traditional white dress in satin with a long train. Her six bridesmaids wearing cream brocade skirts with grey overskirts and coats of cream satin merveilleieux....Ten times the number of people who could be accommodated had turned up, and most of them were now waiting near the entrance gate."

They began their married life in Grosvenor Street, London and a rented country home, Escrick Park in Yorkshire. In 1888 they had their first son Keith Graham Menzies, then Stewart Graham Menzies in 1890 and their third son Ian Graham Menzies in 1895. A photo taken in about 1925 shows the two eldest boys and Jack Menzies with the Wilsons.

By 1903 Jack had made some disastrous financial investments, principally in a diamond mine in South Africa. He also gambled heavily at cards and on the racetrack and was said to be an alcoholic. In 1906 Susannah left him and returned to Tranby Croft. It seems that in reality the marriage was over although there was no divorce or formal separation. In 1911 Jack Menzies died of tuberculosis.

== Second marriage ==
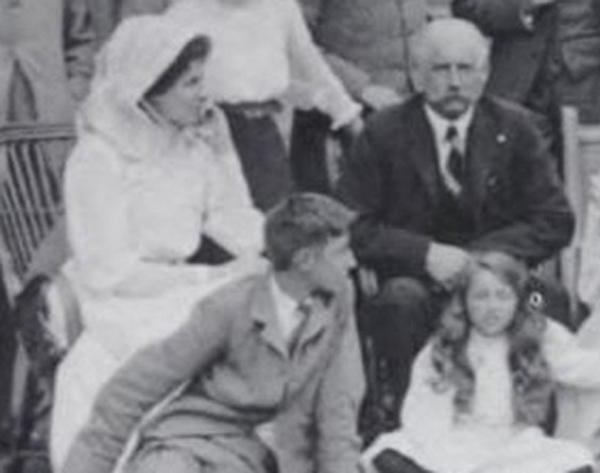
Sir George and Lady Holford shortly after their marriage circa 1912.

Susannah had known Sir George Holford for some time as they both moved in court circles. The 1891 Census shows that on the day of the Census George was staying with Susannah and her husband Jack at Escrick for what appears to be a royal house party as Prince Albert Victor is included in the list of residents at Escrick on that day.

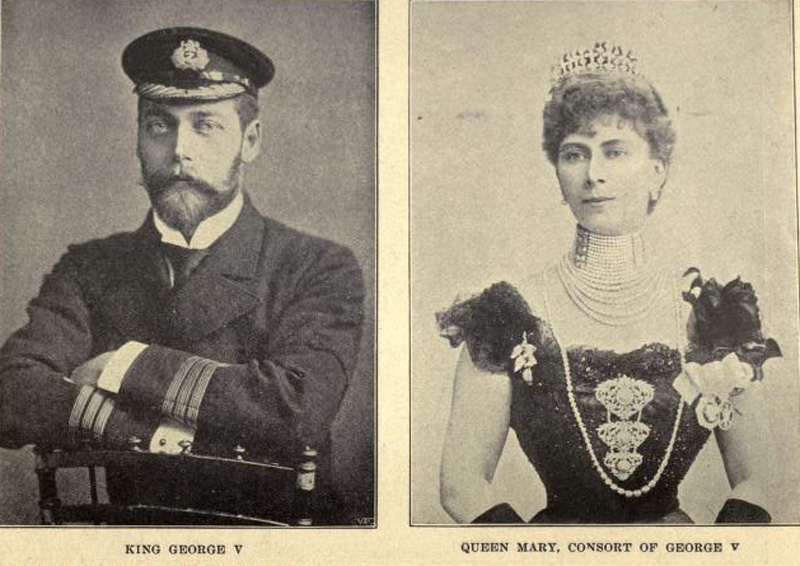
King George V and Queen Mary who attended the wedding of Sir George and Lady Holford.

In 1912, a year after Susannah was widowed, she married George in the Chapel Royal, St James. She was 48 and he 52 years old. George V, Queen Mary, Queen Alexandra and Princess Victoria were present. The wedding was described in detail in The Times:

"The aisle was lined by non-commissioned officers of the bridegroom's old regiment the 1st Life Guards. The bride who was given away by her two sons, wore a gown of old Point d'Alencon lace with a train of gold brocade veiled in chiffon. Instead of a hat she wore a headdress of gold lace and pink roses and she carried a bouquet of orchids... The King and Queen gave Sir George Holford a pair of sleeve links bearing the Royal monogram in diamonds and rubies."

They shared a mutual interest in trees and gardens; so much so that the Botanical Society of the British Isles stated:

"A happier union could not be conceived and their mutual taste for gardening in its highest stage of development. Nothing but loving care and [infinite] trouble could have made Silk Wood and the surroundings so supremely lovely."

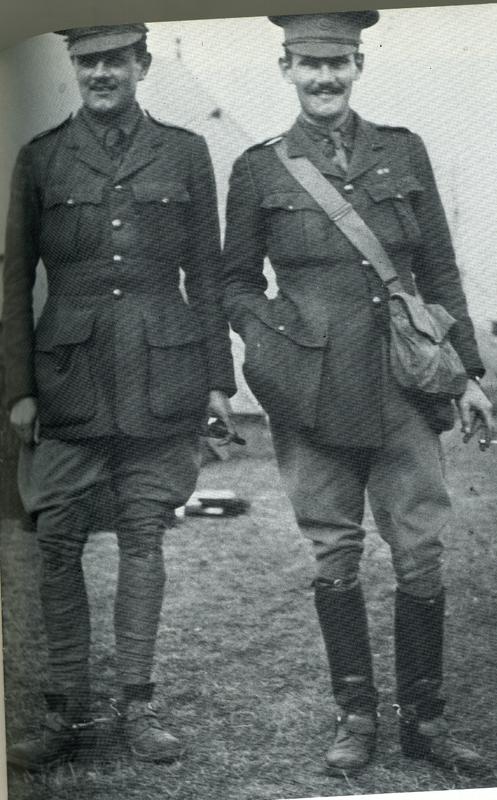
Keith (left) and Stewart Menzies just before they left for Belgium in 1914.

When the War began in 1914, Susannah's two eldest sons Keith and Stewart went to fight. They were both in the Second Life Guards and were sent to Belgium in October 1914. They fought at Ypres and were involved in very heavy bombardments. Stewart sent Susannah regular letters to tell her that he and Keith were unhurt. One letter said.

"I suppose this 2nd Battle of Ypres has been the fiercest of the war. It lasted 6 days and there must have been close on 100,000 [casualties] including British, French, Belgian and German.....Then the artillery fire was something astounding – it fairly took our breath away as it never ceased day and night – one continuous roar of the loudest thunder.

In 1915, Stewart Menzies joined the intelligence section of the army and remained there until the end of the war. After the war, both of Susannah's sons returned home and married soon afterwards. Stewart Menzies became a frequent visitor of the Holfords and came to stay with them at Dorchester House and Westonbirt.

Suannah and George sometimes entertained royalty at Westonbirt. In 1922 Queen Mary visited Westonbirt and afterward sent a letter to the Holfords, thanking them. She said "all the arrangements you were made were so perfect in every way and the expeditions were the greatest success and very enjoyable."

== After the death of George Holford ==
In 1926 George Holford died, having suffered for some time with emphysema. As he did not have any heirs his property passed to his blood relatives in accordance with the will of his father Robert Stayner Holford. The main part of the estate went to George's nephew the 4th Earl of Morley. However, Susannah was well provided for as George left her his personal goods such as jewellery and furniture and a large annuity of £10,000 per annum.

Susannah remained at Westonbirt until it was sold in 1927. She then moved to London and lived in a palatial townhouse in Upper Brook Street, Mayfair until 1940. After that she moved to a large house called Dassett near Woking, Surrey which still exists today. In 1943 she died at Dassett at the age of 79 and was buried at Brookwood Cemetery. A memorial service was held for her at St Marks Church, North Audley Street, London on 30 December 1943 and another a few days later at Westonbirt Church.
