= Sheila Mary Denning =

British artist

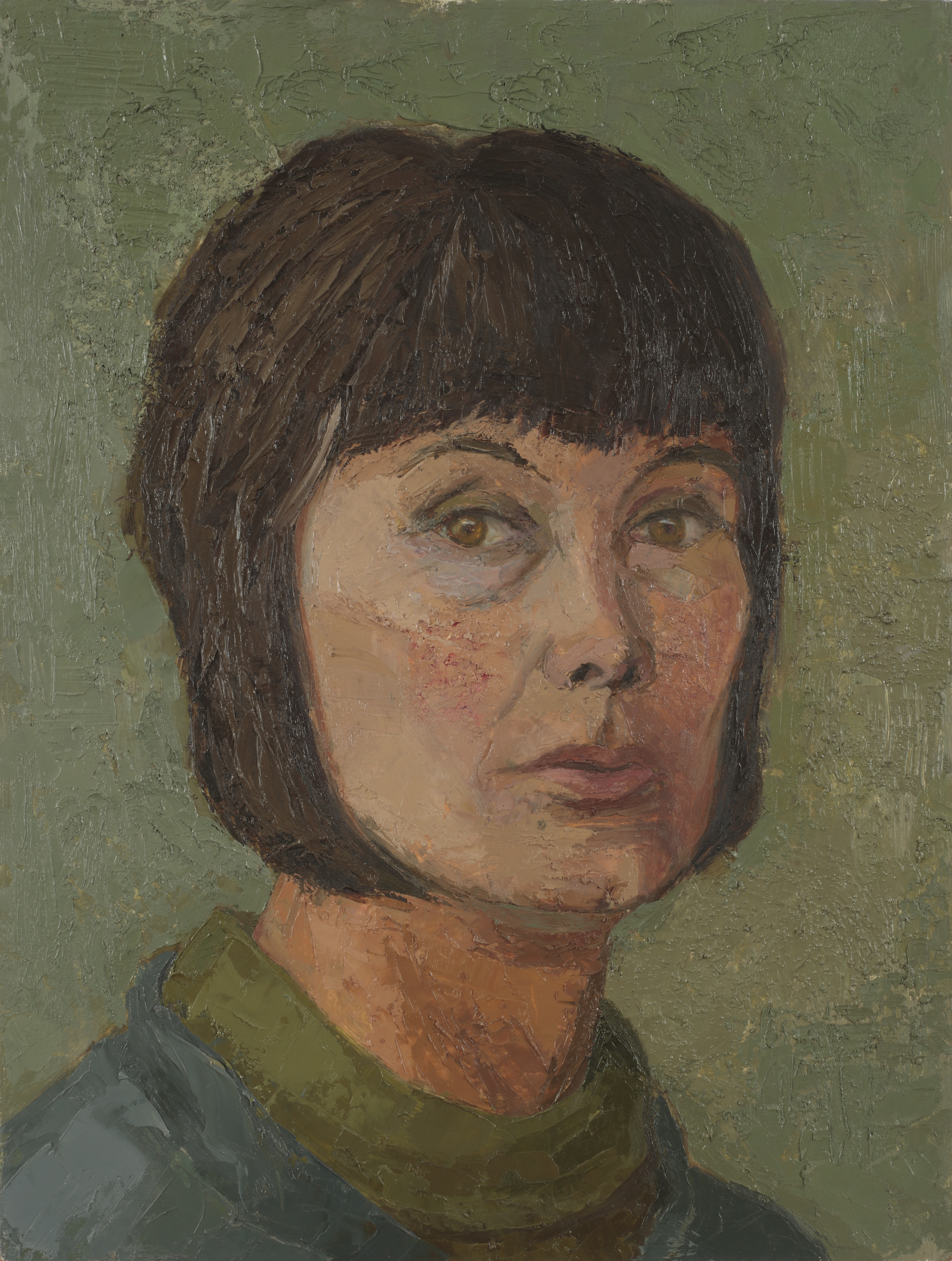
- Self-portrait
- Born: 24 February 1920; West Sussex, England
- Died: 2015 (aged 94–95)
- Education: Westminster School of Art; Heatherley School of Fine Art; Camberwell School of Arts and Crafts
- Known for: Painting

Sheila Mary Denning (1920–2015) was a British painter.

== Early life ==
Sheila Mary Denning was born in West Sussex to an English mother and Irish GP father. After a sheltered rural childhood spent mostly in Gloucestershire and Wiltshire and two years at Westonbirt School, she studied at the Westminster School of Art from 1938 to 1939. Her father, who disapproved of her decision to become a painter, withdrew funding mid-way through the year. Sheila's photographer uncle John French suggested she work as a photographic fashion model, making use of her six-foot height and stunning good looks. He helped her find work and she was able to continue her studies part time until the outbreak of World War II.

== War service ==
Denning spent five years in the army where she worked as a chauffeur and driving instructor before becoming an officer with the Army Education Corps, organizing cultural events. By 1944 she was moving in Quaker circles. Appalled by the bombing of Dresden, she applied for exemption from military service as a conscientious objector and left the army in spring 1945.

== Training ==
Denning resumed her painting studies after the war. She did this first at Heatherley School of Fine Art from 1946 to 1947 and subsequently at Camberwell School of Arts and Crafts from 1947 to 1950, where she was taught by William Coldstream and Victor Pasmore, and by Martin Bloch. Denning found the rigorous realist techniques taught at Camberwell under the influence of Coldstream of limited value and gained more from the tuition of Bloch, a German Jewish refugee who had travelled throughout Europe meeting and working with a wide range of artists. His approach showed the influence of German expressionism and he had a ‘masterful understanding of how colour and light affected atmosphere’. After leaving Camberwell, Denning studied pottery part-time at Farnham School of Art.

== Pottery ==
From 1952 to 1959, Denning jointly set up and ran Hawkley Pottery in Eastcombe, Gloucestershire, with Thornhill, although he was the dominant partner and she was never enthusiastic about pottery.

== Painting career ==
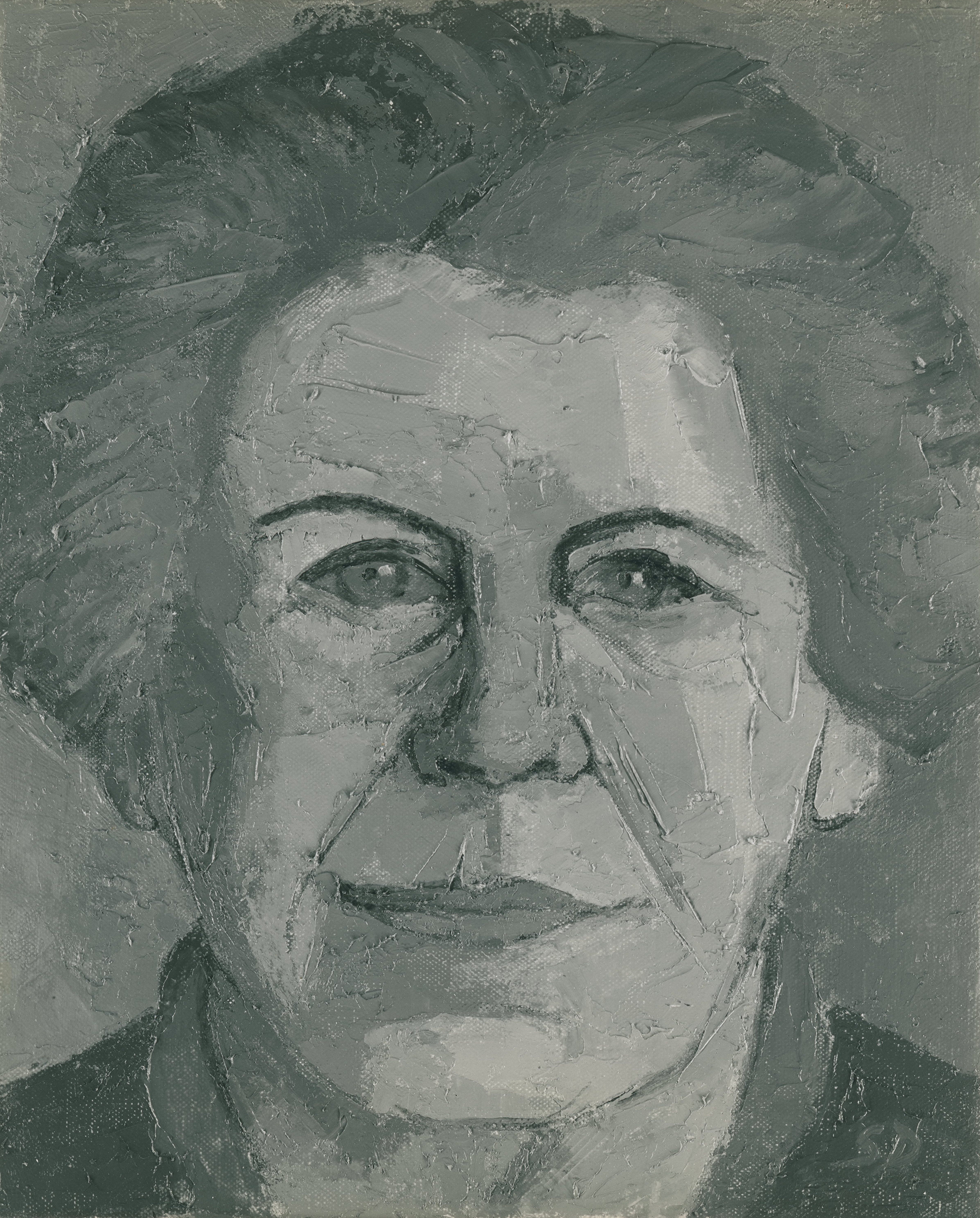
Nell Brentnall

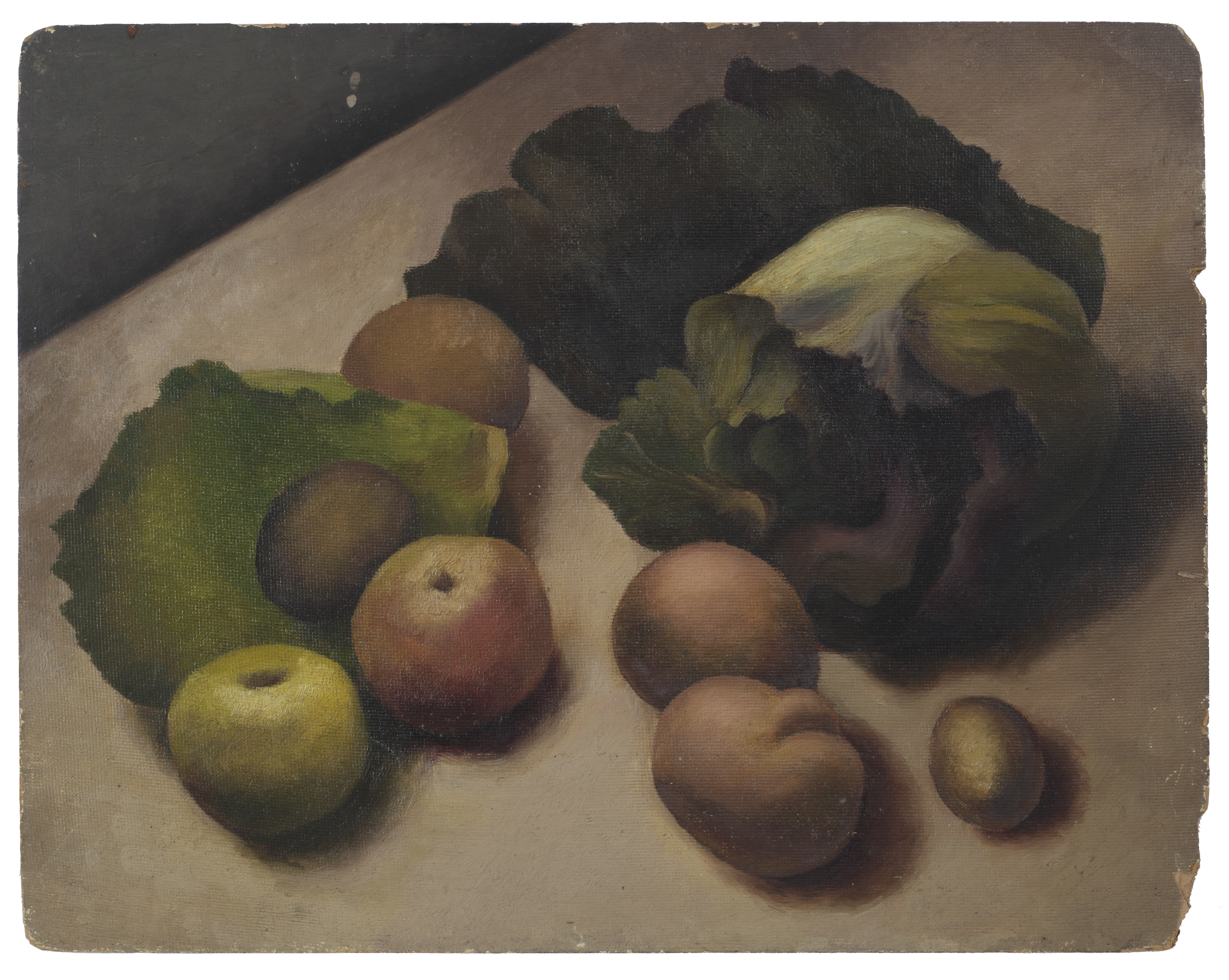
Still life with cabbage, potatoes and egg, 1938

From 1946 to 1994, Denning worked primarily as a portrait painter and she became a member of the Contemporary Portrait Society in the mid-1960s. She also painted landscapes and still life. She worked in oils, drew in pencil and made prints. In the 1960s she worked for a short period as an art therapist. Denning taught painting for many years at adult education institutes in West Sussex, at Brighton Technical College and occasionally at Heatherleys School of Art, as well as running private courses in portraiture and landscape from her home in Chichester.

== Exhibitions ==
=== Solo exhibitions ===
- Clarendon Gallery, London, 1985
- Eastgate Gallery, Chichester, 1987
- Pallant House Garden Gallery, Chichester, 1996

=== Mixed exhibitions ===
- Contemporary Portrait Society
- Royal Society of Portrait Painters
- Royal Society of British Artists
- Pastel Society
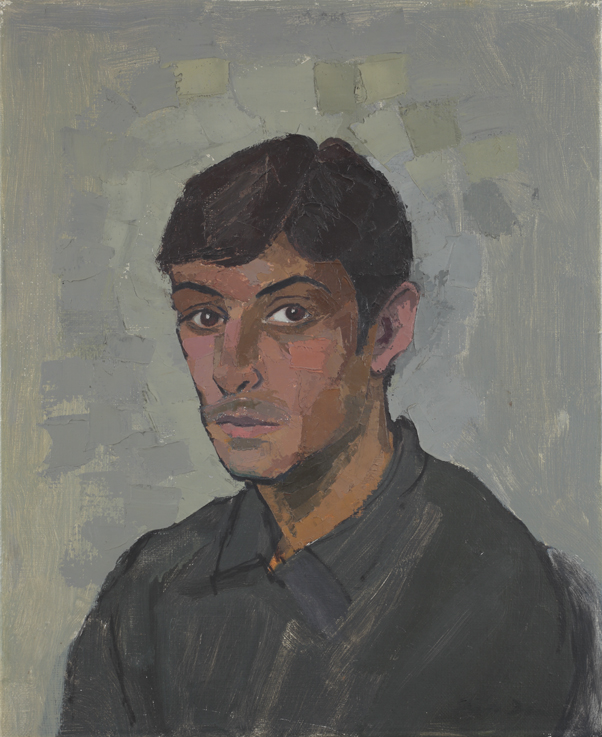
- Portrait of Martin
  Society of Graphic Artists
- University of London Institute of Education
- Ashgate and New Ashgate Gallery, Farnham
- David Paul Gallery, Chichester
- Portsmouth City Museum Biennale, 1992
- York Street Gallery, Bath
- Sussex Open, Brighton, 1995, 1998
- Discerning Eye Exhibition, Mall Galleries, London 1997
- Chichester Festivities Exhibition, “Space and Light”, 1999
- Bradford on Avon Arts Festival, 2007, 2008
