= George Holford =

British Army officer and courtier

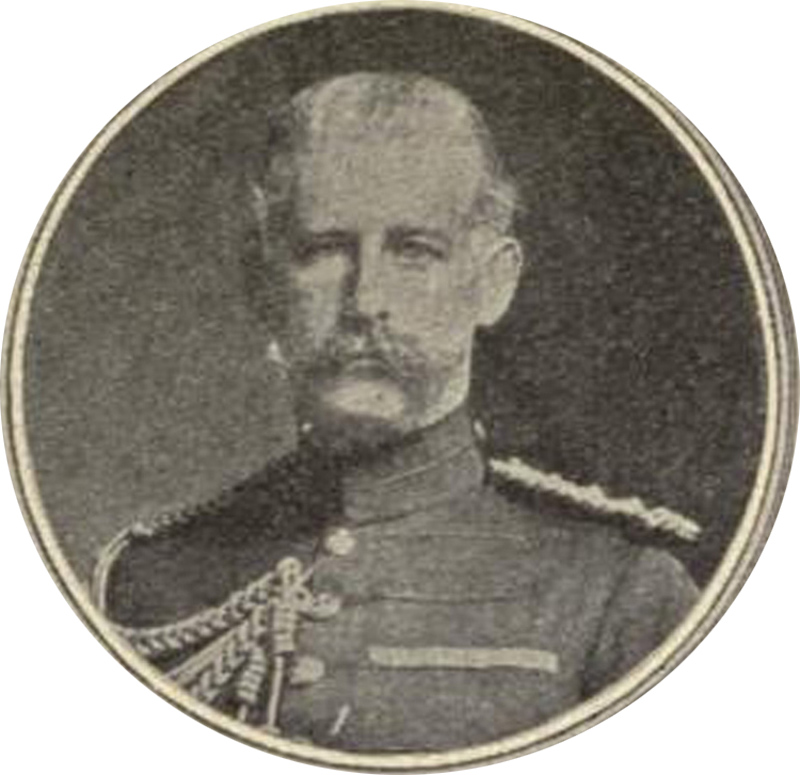
Holford c.1910

Lieutenant-Colonel Sir George Lindsay Holford KCVO CIE CBE (2 June 1860 – 11 September 1926) was a British Army officer and courtier. The son of Robert Stayner Holford, he inherited his father's considerable fortune, which included the Westonbirt House in Gloucestershire and Dorchester House on Park Lane, London. He continued his father's work in developing the Westonbirt Arboretum, which still exists today and is open to the public.

== Early life ==
George was the only son of Mary Ann Holford (née Lindsay) and Robert Stayner Holford. He had three elder sisters, Margaret, Evelyn and Alice. In 1873 George went to Eton and was there for four years. At the age of 20 in 1880, George obtained a commission with the 1st Life Guards, where he remained for almost 30 years. During this time he was closely associated with royalty and court life. From 1888 to 1892 he was equerry to Prince Albert, Duke of Clarence. When the Duke died in 1892 an official Memoir was published in his honour and George's journal was used to outline the Prince's activities when he was in India. An extract from the journal paints a colourful picture of his life in India with Prince Albert:

His Royal Highness received separate visits from about five-and twenty of the principal chiefs and natives, each coming with his attendants and staying about five minutes. This took up nearly the whole morning....At six o'clock a great fete was given to the Prince by the Calcutta community on the Maidan. It was chiefly a native entertainment. The illuminations were splendid; all the trees on the Maidan were covered with bamboo scaffolding, on which were hung thousands of small lamps. The whole of the ouline of the Fort was also lighted up. The fete took place in an immense group of tents. In the central tent the royalties and the Viceroy were placed on gold chairs while a varied performance took place – juggling, music and nautches. After about an hour there we visited the different booths – a native play in one, some Tibetan dancers with extraordinary masks in another. Last of all two hundred men in white danced the famous kuttak dance round a bonfire. It was very fine.

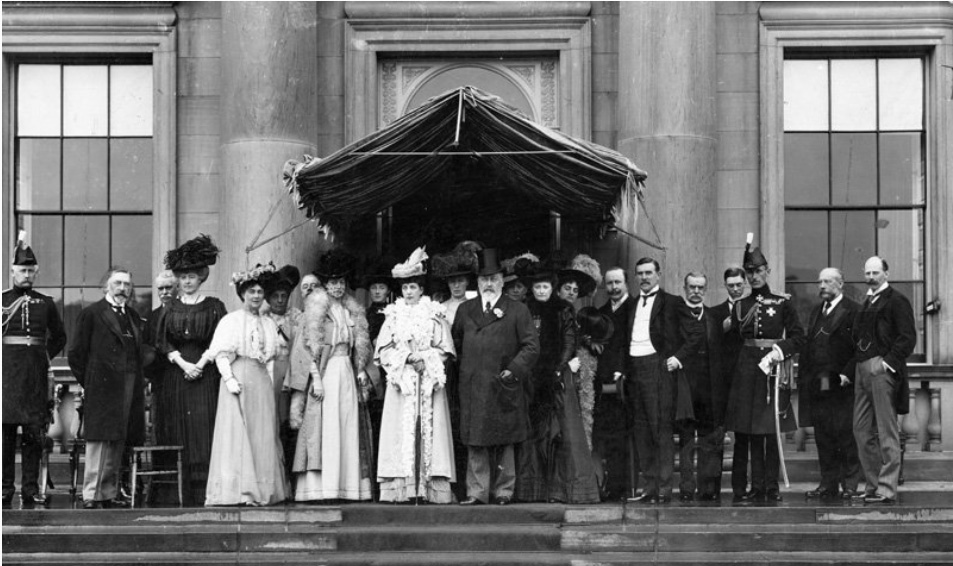
Sir George Holford (far left) with Royal Party of King Edward and Queen Alexandra in 1908

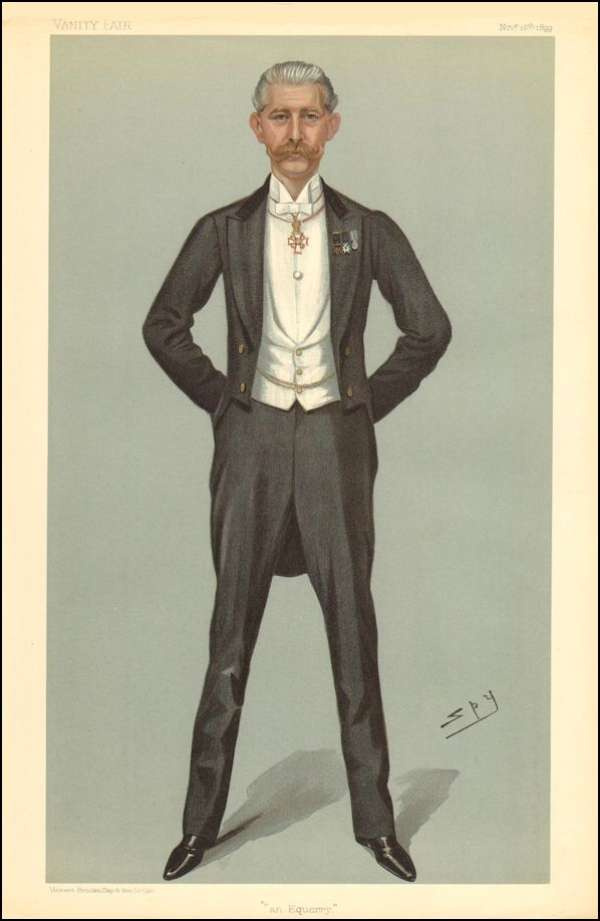
Caricature of Sir George Holford in "Vanity Fair" 1899.

From 1892, George was Equerry to Prince Edward. Soon after the Boer War began in 1899, George decided to temporarily relinquish his post of equerry and rejoin his regiment who were at the front in South Africa. George's departure is mentioned in a publication of the time, and he is praised thus: "it certainly speaks much for the patriotic spirit which is so rife in the country at the present time, when men like Captain Holford volunteer for active service." The New York Times made similar comments, saying "Among the latest distinguished men going to South Africa is Captain Holford who is one of the closest friends of the Prince of Wales and his equerry. The Captain sails 6 January to join his regiment, the First Life Guards."

After King Edward died in 1910, Holford was equerry-in-waiting to Queen Alexandra and extra-equerry to King George. The photograph of the Royal Party of Edward and Alexandra shows George (far left) in uniform.

Early in 1918, Col. Holford detailed Capt. Percy Elworthy, Machine Gun Officer of the First Life Guards, to thoroughly evaluate the Madsen machine gun which was being offered on attractive terms by the Danish government. The weapon passed all tests, and the final demonstration at Rainham, Essex, in front of King George V and other notables was a great success. However, any notion of purchasing the Madsen, to the annoyance of Colonel Holford, Admiral Jackie Fisher and others, was scotched by General Maxse, a Lewis gun enthusiast.

== Interests ==
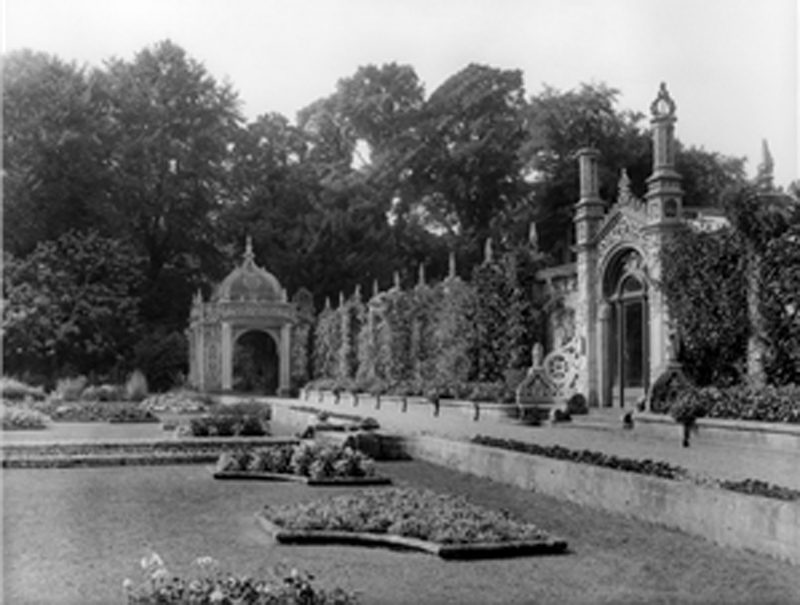
The Italian Garden at Westonbirt House, 1905

On his father's death in 1892, George inherited Westonbirt House and its arboretum. He also inherited Dorchester House in London, and the art and book collection housed within it. He did not have his father's interest in art and books but he did have a passion for gardens and orchids, so he devoted much of his time to his property at Westonbirt.

The Times made the following comment about him:

He was indeed, one of the most successful amateur gardeners of the time, and though famous as a grower of orchids, amaryllids and Javanese rhododendrons, his garden and estate show a wide catholicity of taste. The arrangement of the many rare and exotic trees there and the skilful use of evergreen species as background and to provide the shelter so needful in a cold district like the Cotswolds, have rarely been equalled; there is no crowding of the trees; each is able to show its true form and all have been well cared for. On few estates has the autumnal colouring of deciduous tress been so cleverly used by harmony and contrast, as, for instance, in the planting of Norway maples and glaucous Atlantic cedars.

"Country Life" magazine wrote extensive articles about Westonbirt Gardens and Arboretum in 1905 and again in 1907 when George was the owner of the estate. They outlined in detail the beauty of the gardens, summarised thus:

Captain Holford has carried on the work in the same spirit and with the same tradition (as his father) and Westonbirt is now more luxuriant and more beautiful than the late Mr Holford ever knew it. The gardens have been planted not to give an effect for one season only but to be invested with beauty at every time of the year.

== Marriage and family ==
Although he was considered an eligible bachelor, Holford did not marry until late in life and had no children. In 1912 he married the recently widowed Susannah Menzies (daughter of the shipowner Arthur Wilson) at the Chapel Royal, St James. She was 48 and he 52 years old. George V, Queen Mary, Queen Alexandra and Princess Victoria were present. Although they had no children, it seems that George regarded her three adult sons with affection. They frequently stayed at Westonbirt, and Stewart Menzies (later Chief of the Secret Intelligence Service) was allowed to use Dorchester House as his London residence. George left them some money in his will.

George Holford died in 1926, having suffered for some time with emphysema. As he did not have any heirs his property passed to his blood relatives in accordance with the will of his father, Robert Stayner Holford. The main part of the estate went to George's nephew Edmund Parker, 4th Earl of Morley. Susannah survived until 1944.
