= June Jacobs =

June Ruth Jacobs CBE (June 1930 – 22 July 2018) was a British peace activist and a former President of the International Council of Jewish Women.

== Life ==
Born in 1930, child of Lilly and Louis Caller, Jacobs was educated in the United States (as a wartime evacuee) and then at Westonbirt School. In 1950 she married Basil Jacobs who she met at a youth club in the East End of London where they both volunteered; they had three children.

In 1971, as chairman of the Jewish Women's Association, Jacobs staged a 24-hour fast outside the Soviet embassy in London to draw attention to the plight of a sick Jewish woman serving a 10-year sentence in a labour camp having been accused of an attempted hijacking. After her husband's death in 1973 Jacobs became involved full-time in campaigning.

The founder and first Chair of the National Council for Soviet Jews, she led missions in the 1970s to visit Jews who had been denied permission to emigrate (refuseniks) from the Soviet Bloc. She visited as part of a "tourist group and then" managed to "break away from them", risking jail for her activities. In particular, she regularly visited Moscow and Leningrad (now St Petersburg).

Jacobs later became known as an advocate of Jewish women's issues. As President of the International Council of Jewish Women (1996–2002), she represented the organisation at the UN Commission on the Status of Women in New York. She remained involved late in her life through her membership of the European Women's Lobby and Women's International Commission.

Jacobs was a member of the board of directors of the New Israel Fund, a campaign for social justice in Israel. She was a patron of the Jewish Council for Racial Equality (JCORE), a member of the Black Jewish Asian Forum, Life President of Jewish Child's Day, and Vice-President of the Memorial Foundation for Jewish Culture and Chairperson of their Nahum Goldmann Fellowship Program.

As foreign affairs spokesperson for the Board of Deputies of British Jews, she courted controversy in meeting first representatives of the Palestine Liberation Organisation in the UK and later the leader of the PLO, Yasser Arafat. Jacobs was unrepentant in the face of criticism of these meetings saying "it was just the right thing to do: how else can we attempt to bring peace if we don't talk?".

A trustee of the Kessler Foundation, she was "Chairperson, Mishpacha" of this New York based foundation committed to the renewal and enhancement of Jewish culture worldwide. She was chairperson of the EJC Commission on European Institutions (Great Britain) and a senior Trustee of the Next Century Foundation.

Jacobs was appointed Commander of the Order of the British Empire (CBE) in the 2009 Birthday Honours. June Jacobs lived in Kentish Town, London. She died on 22 July 2018 at the age of 88 after suffering a stroke.
