= Pinus veitchii =

Scientific classification
- Kingdom: Plantae
- Clade: Tracheophytes
- Clade: Gymnosperms
- Division: Pinophyta
- Class: Pinopsida
- Order: Pinales
- Family: Pinaceae
- Genus: Pinus
- Species: P. veitchii

Binomial name
- Pinus veitchii Roezl

Synonyms
- Pinus ayacahuite var. loudoniana (Gordon & Glend.) Silba; Pinus ayacahuite subsp. loudoniana (Gordon & Glend.) A.E.Murray; Pinus ayacahuite subsp. popocatepetlii (Roezl) Silba; Pinus ayacahuite subsp. veitchii (Roezl) Silba; Pinus ayacahuite var. veitchii (Roezl) Shaw; Pinus bonapartea Roezl; Pinus loudoniana Gordon & Glend.; Pinus popocatepetlii Roezl; Pinus strobiformis subsp. veitchii (Roezl) Frankis; Pinus veitchii var. zempoalensis Gaussen

Species of conifer

Pinus veitchii is a species of conifer in the family Pinaceae. It is straight, slender tree which grows up to 30 meters tall, with a conic crown which becomes rounded or irregular when mature. It is native to central Mexico, where it grows in the Trans-Mexican Volcanic Belt of Michoacán, Morelos, Mexico, and Tlaxcala states, and possibly Guanajuato and western Hidalgo. It grows in mixed conifer or pine-oak montane forests, often in areas receiving occasional snow, from (2000) 2500 to 3200 (3600) meters elevation. It is often an emergent tree.

The species was first described by Benedikt Roezl in 1857. Many authorities have treated it as a variety, hybrid, subspecies, or synonym of P. ayacahuite or P. strobiformis, which are morphologically similar. A phylogenetic and morphological analysis by Ortíz-Martínez et al. published in 2024 concluded that P. veitchii is a distinct species, which likely arose from P. ayacahuite via allopatric speciation. With Pinus wallichiana it is a parent of the garden hybrid Pinus × holfordiana.
