= Pamela Carruthers =

British showjumper

Pamela Isabel Jameson Carruthers (née Torrie, 11 August 1916 – 23 September 2009), was a British showjumper, and showjumping course designer, and "had a profound influence on show jumping courses in many parts of the world".

== Early life ==
She was born Pamela Isabel Jameson Torrie on 11 August 1916 at 19 Atholl Crescent, Edinburgh, the only child of Thomas George Jameson Torrie (1880–1916), a Life Guards lieutenant-colonel, and his wife, Esmé Muriel Torrie, née Crabbe (1895–1984).

Her parents married in September 1915, and her father was killed in action on the Western Front in November 1916. In 1920, her mother married Basil Eddis, a merchant in India, and Pamela spent some time there, until the marriage broke down and they returned to the UK, after which her mother married Ralph Hope Vere.

She was educated at Westonbirt School, near Tetbury, and at the Ozanne finishing school in Paris. She was keen on horses and riding from an early age, and after finishing school, enrolled on a riding course at the Cavalry School of Equitation in Saumur, France. Her mother sent her money to purchase a fur coat, but she spent it on a horse instead.

== Career ==
Back home in Dumfriesshire, Scotland, she opened a riding school, and began a career in showjumping and exhibiting horses. Over time she became ever more involved in designing showjumping courses.

Carruthers designed Spruce Meadows in Canada, "arguably the world's top permanent arena", and created and developed showjumping courses across Europe, in Australia, New Zealand, South Africa, Venezuela, Brazil, Ireland and the United States.

From 1973 to 1982, Carruthers was responsible for designing the American Invitational's Grand Prix course at Tampa, Florida, the country's top showjumping competition.

== Personal life ==
On 8 November 1939 she married RAF officer Huw Carruthers, in All Saints (Episcopal) Church, Lockerbie. They moved to Wiltshire, where they couple bought a farm in Malmesbury. They had two sons: Christopher Hew Carruthers, born in Hoddom, Dumfriesshire, in 1940, and John Anthony Carruthers, born in Chippenham, Wiltshire, in 1941.

== Later life ==
Carruthers retired in 2003, and lived near Castle Combe, Wiltshire. She died on 23 September 2009, and was survived by her two sons.
