= Westonbirt with Lasborough =

Civil parish in Gloucestershire, England

Coordinates: 51.6220°N 2.2577°W

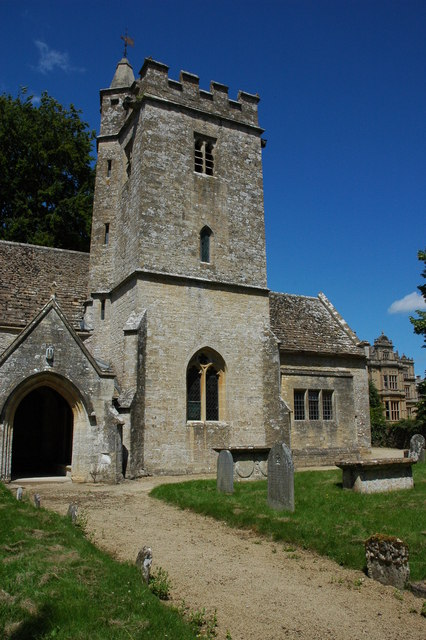
- Westonbirt Church

- Location within Gloucestershire
- Population: 293 (2019)
- Civil parish: Westonbirt with Lasborough
- District: Cotswold
- Shire county: Gloucestershire
- Region: South West
- Country: England
- Sovereign state: United Kingdom
- Post town: Tetbury
- Postcode district: GL8
- Police: Gloucestershire
- Fire: Gloucestershire
- Ambulance: South Western
- UK Parliament: South Cotswolds
- Website: wwlpc.org.uk

Westonbirt with Lasborough is a civil parish in the district of Cotswold, in the county of Gloucestershire, England. It includes the villages of Lasborough and Westonbirt. As of 2019, it has a population of 293.

== History ==
Lasborough was formerly a separate parish but was united with Westonbirt by the mid 17th century.
