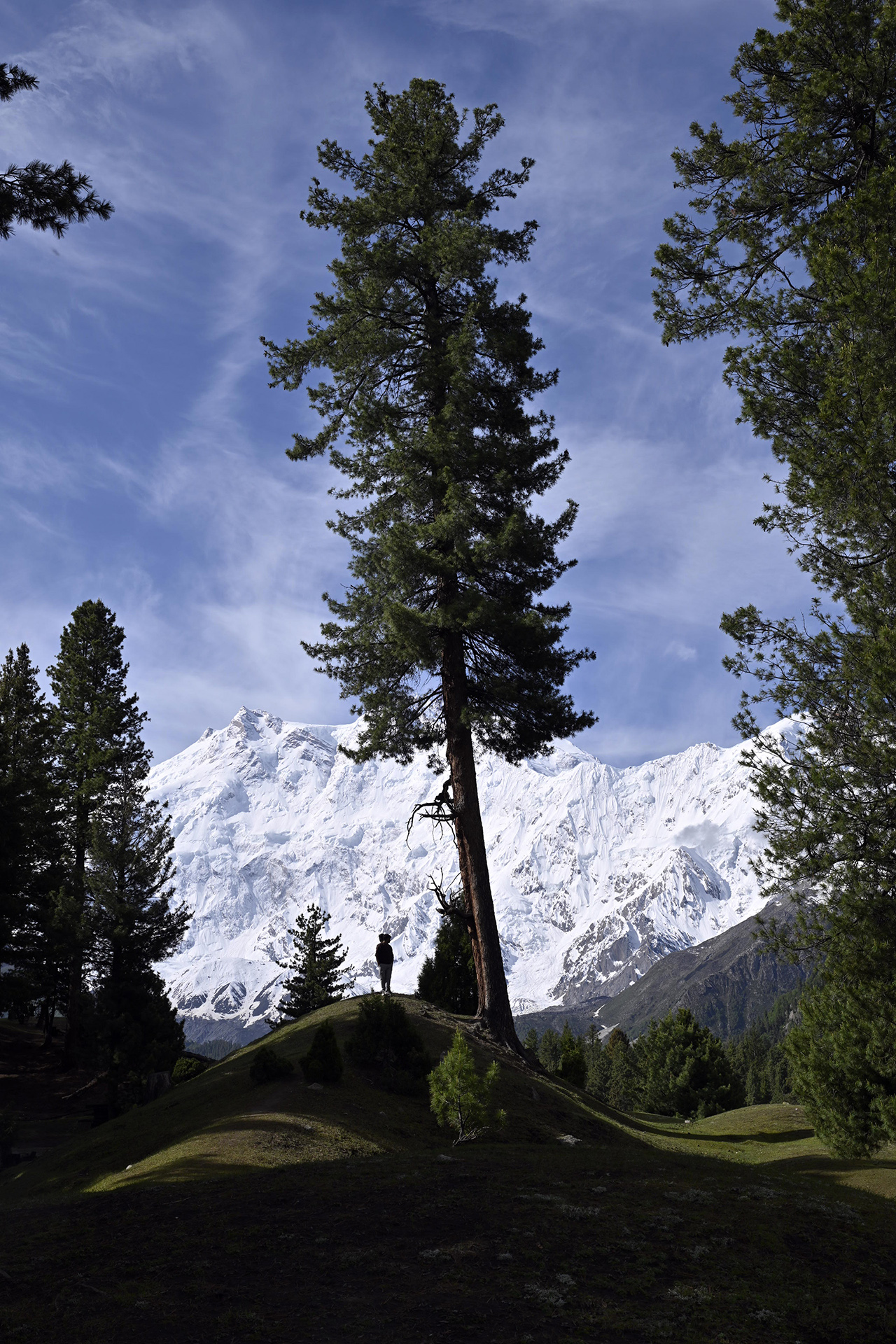
- Pinus wallichiana at Fairy meadows.

Conservation status
- Least Concern (IUCN 3.1)

Scientific classification
- Kingdom: Plantae
- Clade: Tracheophytes
- Clade: Gymnosperms
- Division: Pinophyta
- Class: Pinopsida
- Order: Pinales
- Family: Pinaceae
- Genus: Pinus
- Subgenus: P. subg. Strobus
- Section: P. sect. Quinquefoliae
- Subsection: P. subsect. Strobus
- Species: P. wallichiana

Binomial name
- Pinus wallichiana A. B. Jacks.

Synonyms
- Pinus griffithii McClelland; Pinus excelsa Wall. Pinus chylla Lodd.

= Pinus wallichiana =

Species of conifer

Pinus wallichiana is a coniferous evergreen tree native to the Himalaya, Karakoram and Hindu Kush mountains, from eastern Afghanistan east across northern Pakistan and north west India to Yunnan in southwest China. It grows in mountain valleys at altitudes of 1800–4300 m (rarely as low as 1200 m), reaching large sizes from 30–50 m (98–164 ft) in height. It favours a temperate climate with dry winters and wet summers. In Pashto, it is known as Nishtar.

This tree is often known as Bhutan pine, (not to be confused with the recently described Bhutan white pine, Pinus bhutanica, a closely related species). Other names include blue pine, Himalayan pine and Himalayan white pine.

== Description ==
The leaves ("needles") are in fascicles (bundles) of five and are 12–18 cm long. They are noted for being flexible along their length, and often droop gracefully. The cones are long and slender, 16–32 cm, yellow-buff when mature, with thin scales; the seeds are 5–6 mm long with a 20–30 mm wing.

Typical habitats are mountain screes and glacier forelands, but it will also form old-growth forests as the primary species or in mixed forests with deodar, birch, spruce, and fir. In some places it reaches the tree line.

P. wallichiana is the primary host for Himalayan dwarf mistletoe.

== Cultivation and uses ==
The wood is moderately hard, durable and highly resinous. It is a good firewood but gives off a pungent resinous smoke. It is a commercial source of turpentine which is superior quality than that of P. roxburghii but is not produced so freely.

The tree became available through the European nursery trade in 1836, nine years after the Danish botanist Nathaniel Wallich first introduced seeds to England. It is a popular tree for planting in parks and large gardens, grown for its attractive foliage and large, decorative cones. It is also valued for its relatively high resistance to air pollution, tolerating this better than some other conifers.

This plant and its slow-growing cultivar 'Nana' have gained the Royal Horticultural Society's Award of Garden Merit. With Pinus veitchii it is a parent of the garden hybrid Pinus × holfordiana.

== Gallery ==
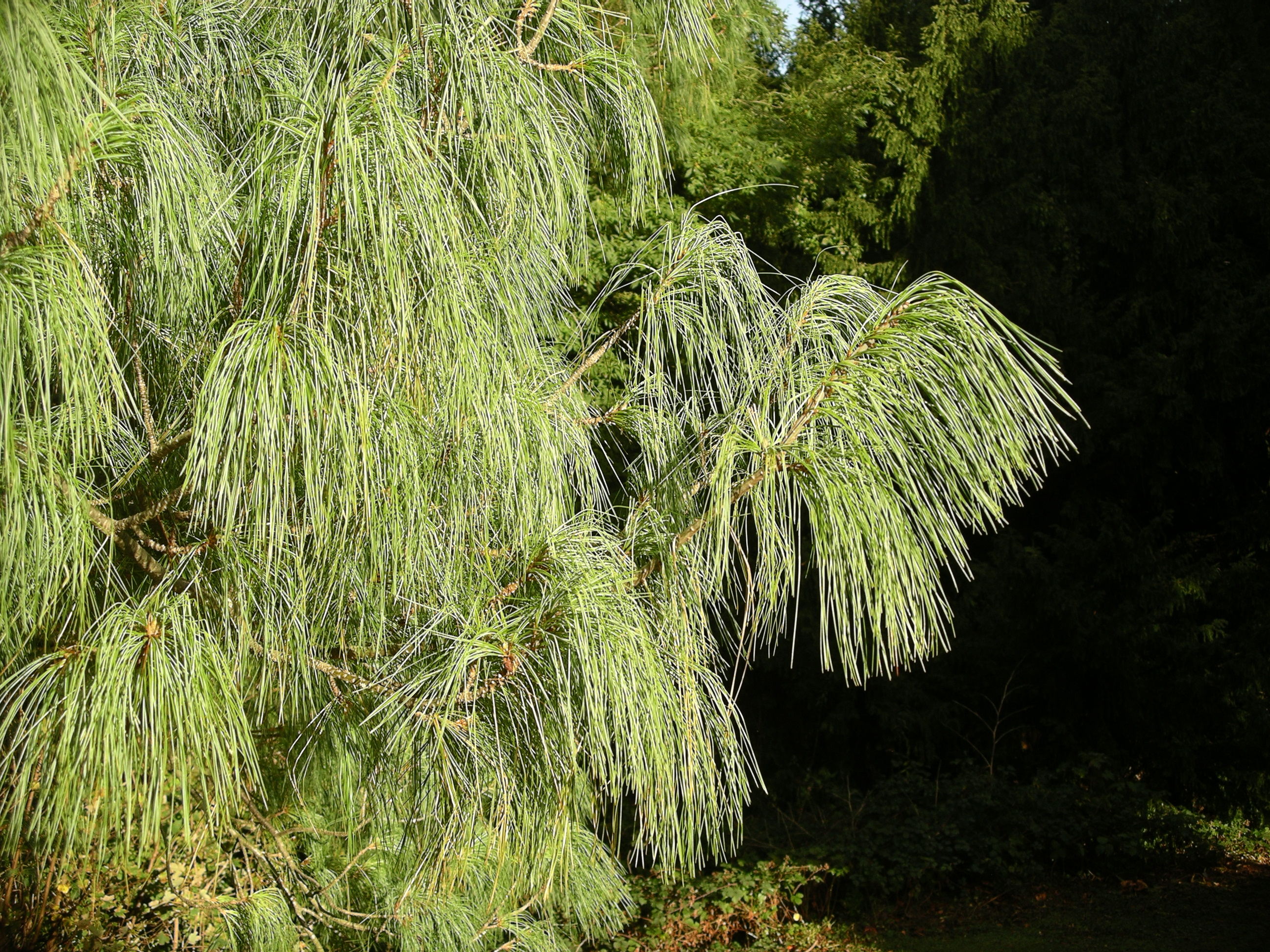
Foliage

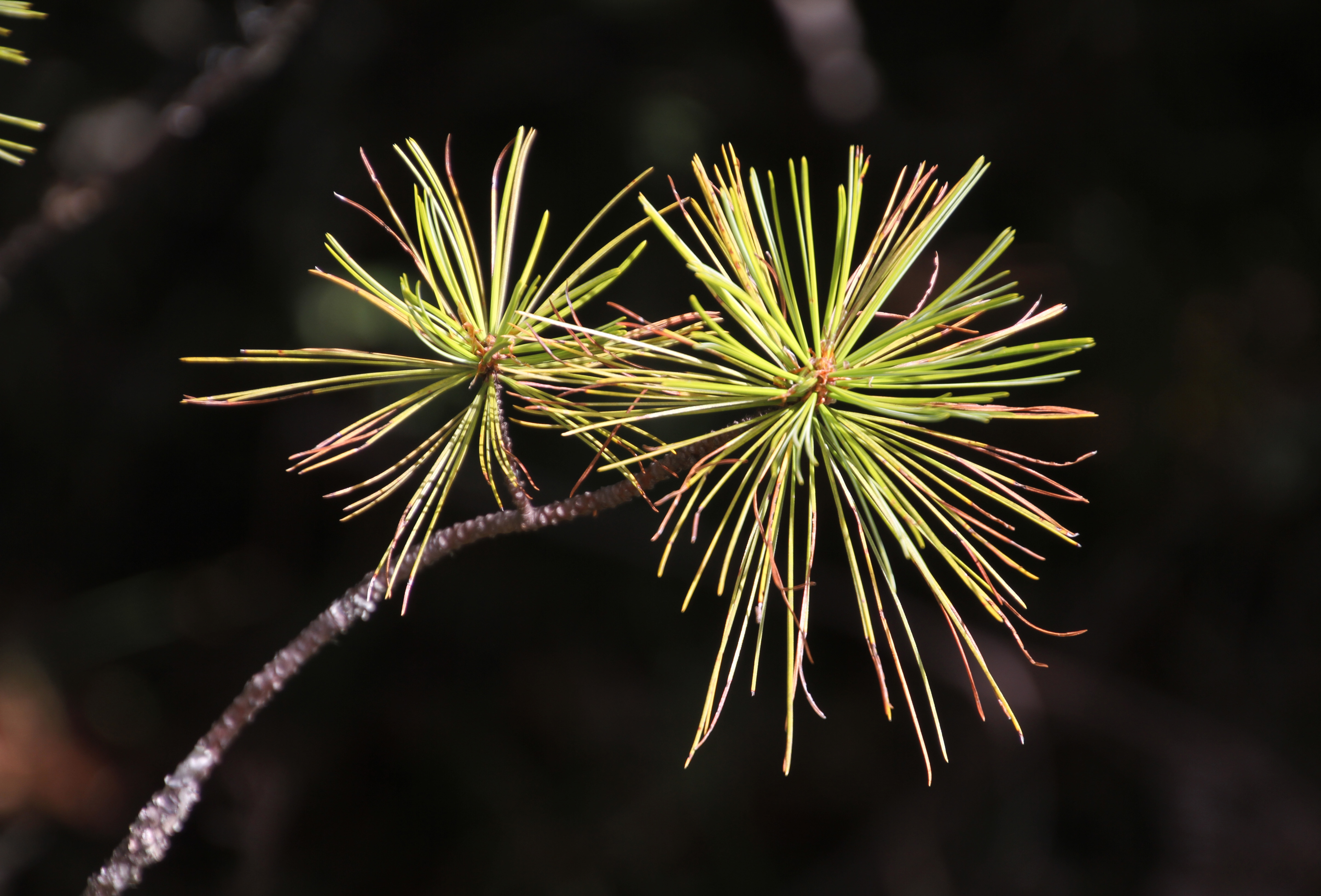
Branch with needles, Paro, Bhutan

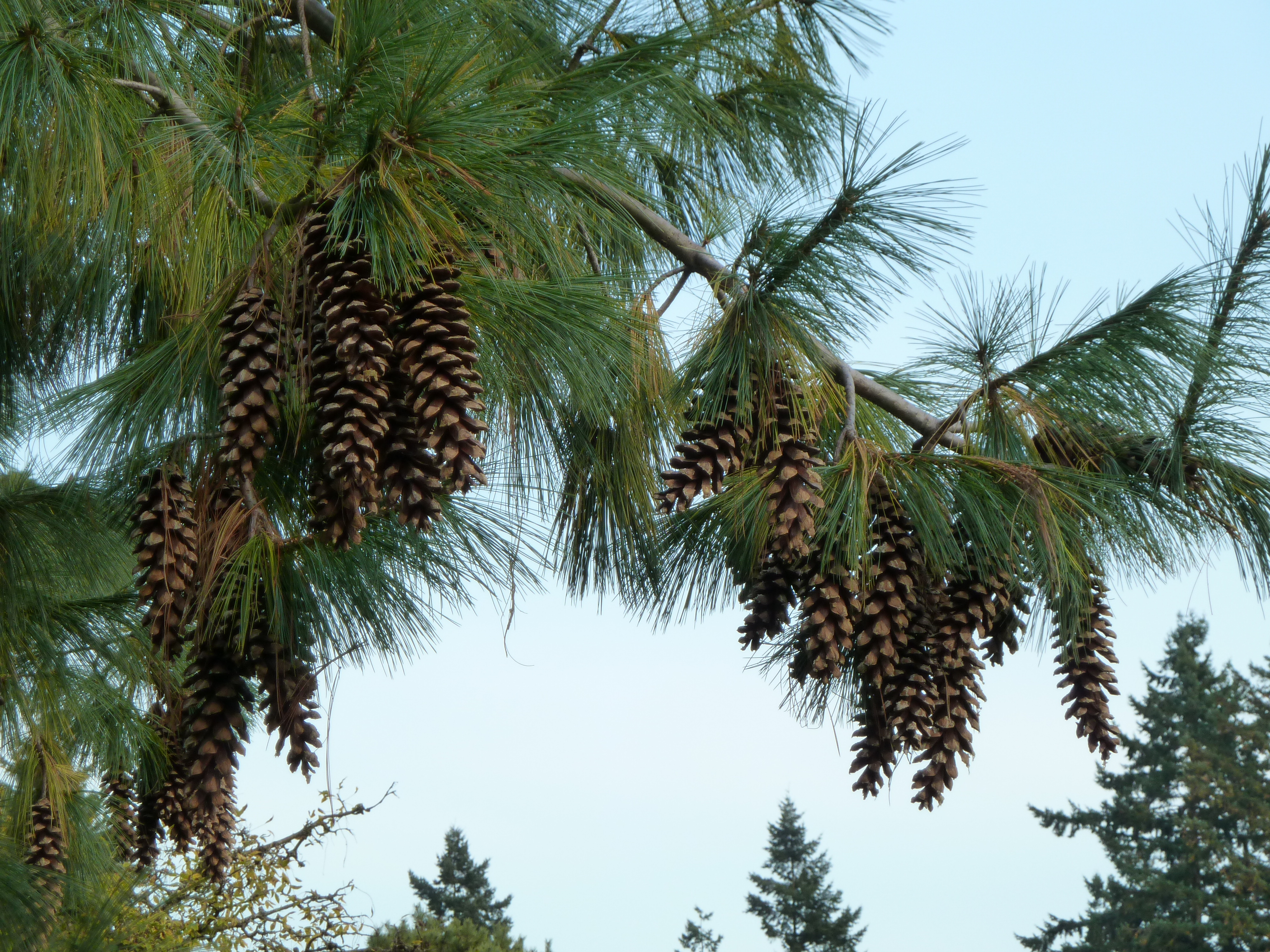
Cones, at VanDusen Botanical Garden

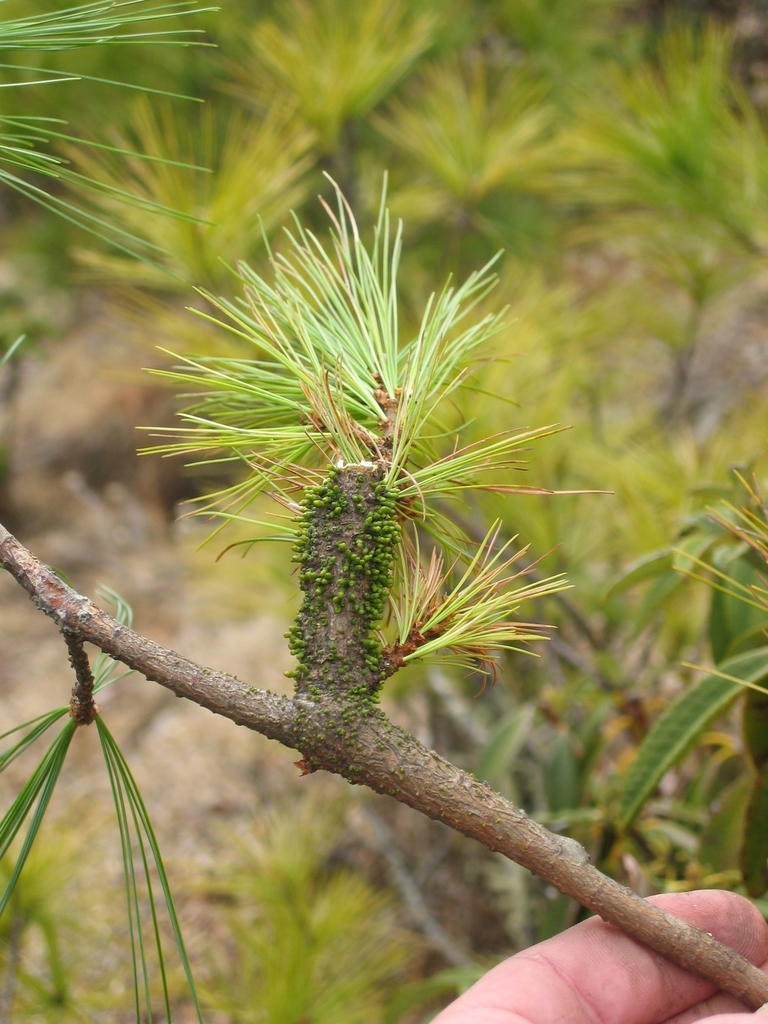
P. wallichiana branch infected with Himalayan dwarf mistletoe

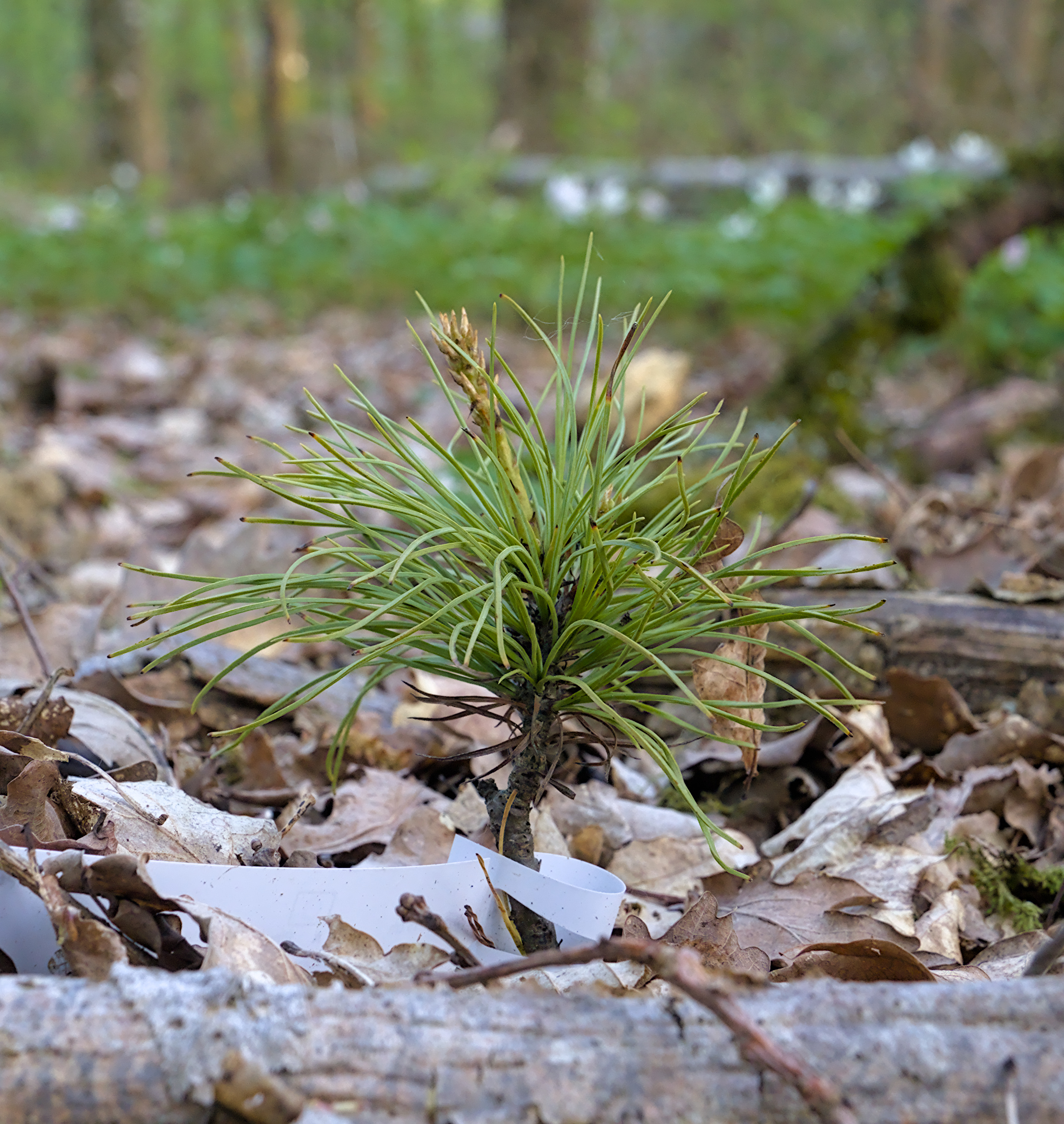
Sapling
