= Lasborough =

Coordinates: 51°38′47″N 2°15′33″W

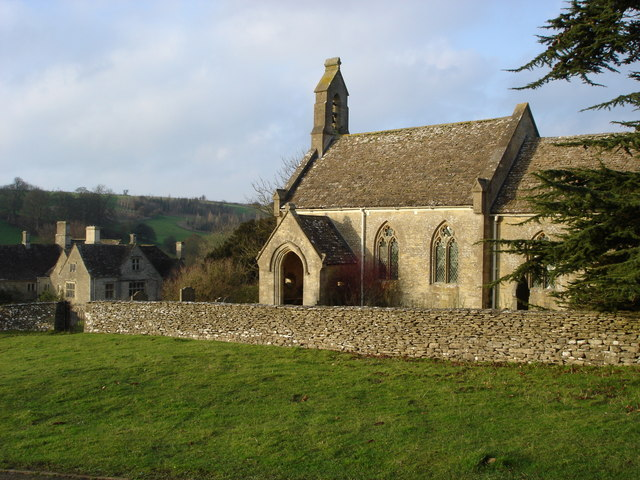
- Lasborough church and manor

- Location within Gloucestershire
- Civil parish: Westonbirt with Lasborough
- District: Cotswold
- Shire county: Gloucestershire
- Region: South West
- Country: England
- Sovereign state: United Kingdom
- Post town: TETBURY
- Postcode district: GL8
- Police: Gloucestershire
- Fire: Gloucestershire
- Ambulance: South Western
- UK Parliament: South Cotswolds

Lasborough is a settlement in Gloucestershire, England, part of the Westonbirt with Lasborough civil parish. Lasborough lies to the west of the A46, about two miles north of Leighterton, two miles south of Kingscote and five miles west of Tetbury.

Lasborough is an ancient settlement, with remains of a Roman villa nearby, and it lay on the Roman road from Bath to Chavenage Green. In 1086, the Domesday Book recorded a settlement of 13 households. However, like its sister community of Westonbirt, the village of Lasborough was largely depopulated in the Middle Ages, with only the manor house and the church surviving.

== Manor House ==
The manor house, which dated from 1319, belonged to the Estcourt family from 1598. It was rebuilt about 1610 as Lasborough Manor (later Lasborough Farm), and the surrounding land enclosed, by Sir Thomas Estcourt (1569–1624). He served as a justice of the peace and a sheriff, as well as two periods as an MP, first for Malmesbury and later for Gloucestershire.

Lasborough House was built in the 1790s on part of the estate of Lasborough Farm for the then owner, Edmund Estcourt, by the architect James Wyatt in a castellated neo-Gothic style.

== St. Mary's Church ==
The medieval parish church comprised a chancel, a nave and a North porch, but by the 1820s it was decayed, open to animals and used for storage. In 1861-2 the church was entirely rebuilt ‘on the old lines’ but following designs by Lewis Vulliamy ; it has chancel, nave, S porch and a bellcote

There is a cylindrical font from the original church. It had been replaced by a new font in 1861, had stood in the churchyard until 1903 and was given to Great Witcombe, but it was eventually reinstated; the pillar is also original.

The church featured in the BBC TV series Lark Rise to Candleford. It is one of the ten churches in the benefice of Badminton.
