= Stewart Menzies =

British head of intelligence (1890–1968)

Major-General Sir Stewart Menzies KCB KCMG DSO MC
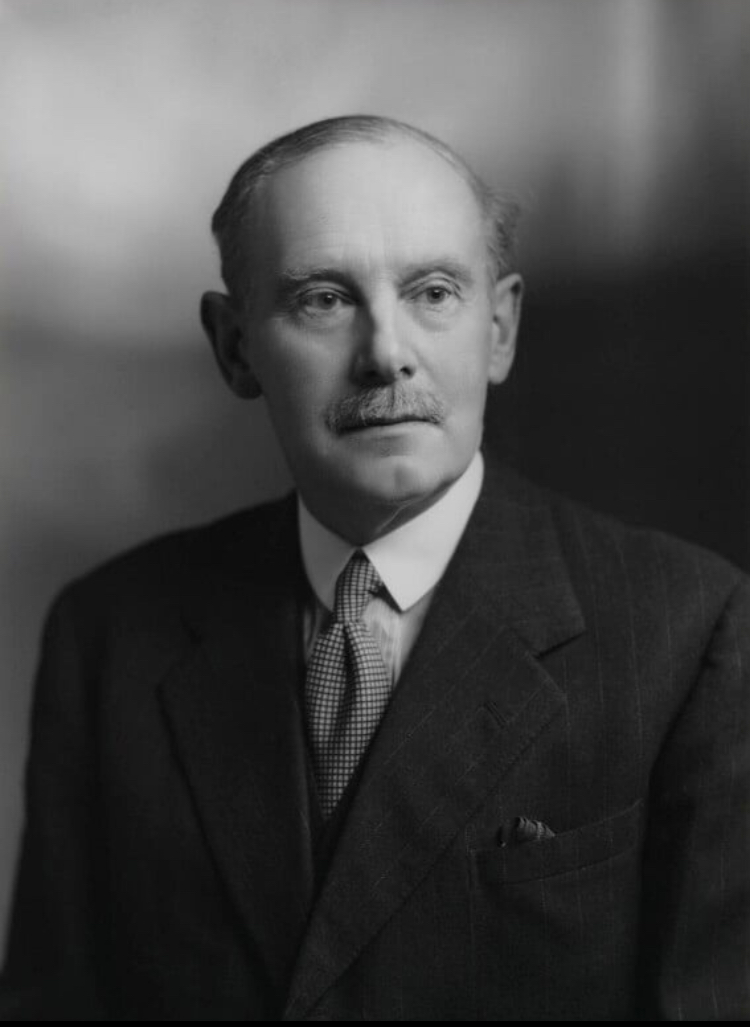

3rd Chief of the Secret Intelligence Service
- In office 1939–1952
- Preceded by: Hugh Sinclair
- Succeeded by: John Sinclair

Personal details
- Born: Stewart Graham Menzies; 30 January 1890 London, England
- Died: 29 May 1968 (aged 78) London, England
- Spouses: Lady Avice Sackville (m. 1918; div. 1931); Pamela Beckett Garton (m. 1932–1951); Audrey Clara Lilian Latham (m. 1952)
- Children: 1
- Parent: Susannah Holford (mother)
- Education: Eton College
- Occupation: Intelligence officer

Military service
- Allegiance: United Kingdom
- Branch/service: British Army; Secret Intelligence Service (SIS/MI6)
- Rank: Major-General
- Unit: Grenadier Guards; Second Life Guards
- Battles/wars: First World War; First Battle of Ypres; Second World War; Cold War

Major-General Sir Stewart Graham Menzies (/ˈmɪŋɪz/; 30 January 1890 – 29 May 1968) was Chief of MI6, the British Secret Intelligence Service (SIS), from 1939 to 1952, during and after the Second World War.

== Early life, family ==
Stewart Graham Menzies was born in England in 1890 into a wealthy family as the second son of John Graham Menzies and Susannah West Wilson, daughter of ship-owner Arthur Wilson of Tranby Croft. His grandfather, Graham Menzies, was a whisky distiller who helped establish a cartel and made huge profits. His parents became friends of King Edward VII. Menzies was a nephew of Scottish Liberal Party politician and member of the House of Commons Robert Stewart Menzies. But Menzies's father was dissolute, never established a worthwhile career, and wasted his share of the family fortune; he died of tuberculosis in 1911 in his early 50s, leaving only a minimal estate.

Menzies was educated at Eton College, becoming president of the student society Pop, and left in 1909. He excelled in sports, hunting and cross-country running. He won prizes for his studies of languages, and was considered an all-around excellent student.

== Early military career ==
=== Life Guards ===
From Eton he joined the Grenadier Guards as a second lieutenant. After a year with this regiment, he transferred to the Second Life Guards. He was promoted to lieutenant and appointed adjutant by 1913.

=== First World War action ===
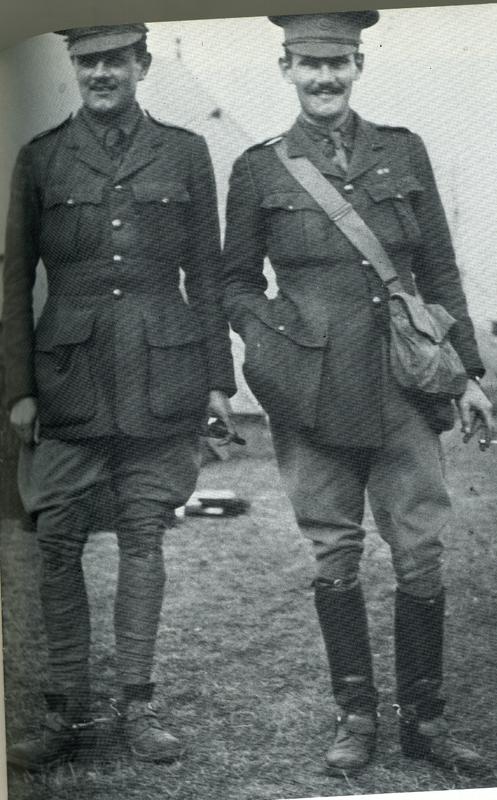
Keith and Stewart Menzies, the two eldest sons of Lady Susannah Holford, pictured here in 1914

During the First World War Menzies served in Belgium. He was wounded at Zandvoorde in October 1914, and fought gallantly in the First Battle of Ypres in November 1914. Menzies was promoted to captain on 14 November, and received the DSO in person from King George V on 2 December.

Menzies's regiment was decimated during fighting in 1915, suffering very heavy casualties in the Second Battle of Ypres. Menzies was seriously injured in a gas attack in 1915, and was honourably discharged from active combat service.

=== Intelligence service ===
He then joined the counterintelligence section of Field Marshal Douglas Haig, the British commander. In late 1917, he reported to senior British leadership that Haig's intelligence chief Brigadier John Charteris was fudging intelligence estimates, which soon led to Charteris's removal. This whistle-blowing was apparently done very discreetly. Menzies was promoted to brevet major before the end of the war.

== MI6 ==
Following the end of the war, Menzies entered MI6 (also known as SIS). He was a member of the British delegation to the 1919 Versailles Peace Conference. Soon after the war, Menzies was promoted to lieutenant-colonel of the Imperial General Staff, General Staff Officer, first grade. Within MI6, he became assistant director for special intelligence. Admiral Hugh Sinclair became director-general of MI6 in 1924, and he made Menzies his deputy by 1929, with Menzies being promoted to full colonel soon afterwards.

In 1924, Menzies was allegedly involved—alongside Sidney Reilly and Desmond Morton—in the forging of the Zinoviev letter. This forgery is considered to have been instrumental in the Conservative Party's victory in the United Kingdom general election of 1924, which ended the country's first Labour government.

== Chief of MI6 ==
In 1939, when Admiral Sinclair died, Menzies was appointed Chief of Secret Intelligence Service (the SIS). He expanded wartime intelligence and counterintelligence departments and supervised codebreaking efforts at Bletchley Park.

=== Second World War ===
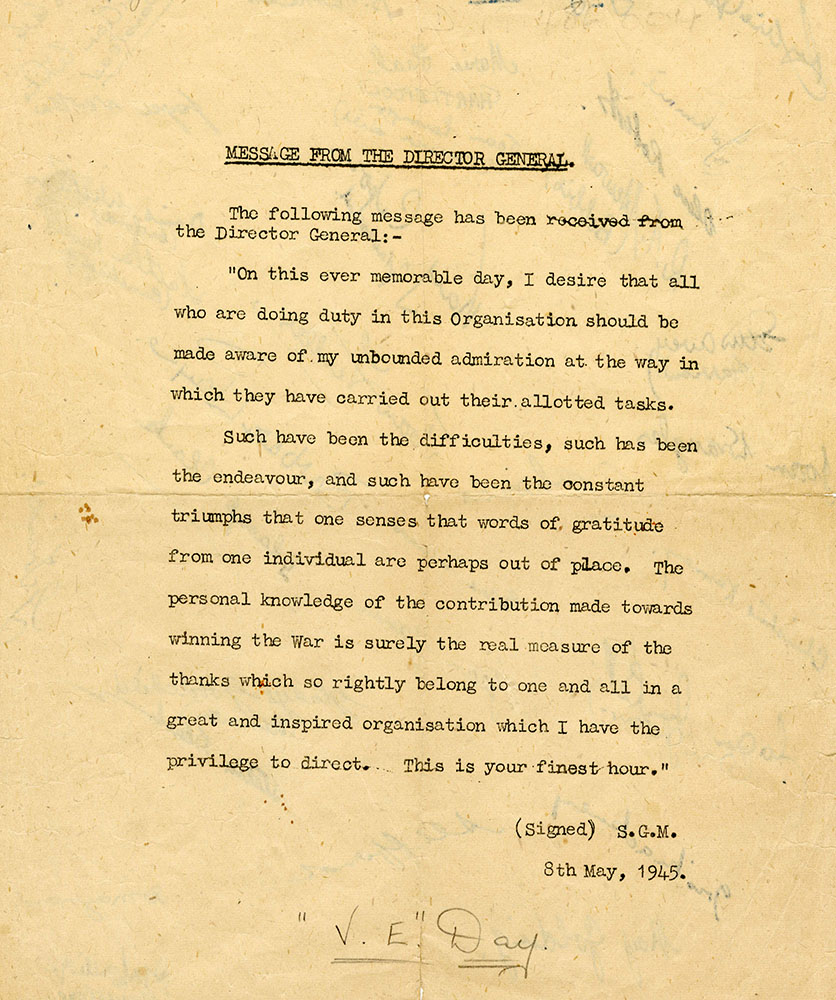
VE letter by S. Menzies to GC&CS

When the Second World War began, SIS expanded greatly. Menzies insisted on wartime control of codebreaking, and this gave him immense power and influence, which he used judiciously. By distributing the Ultra material collected by the Government Code and Cypher School, MI6 became an important branch of the government for the first time. Extensive breaches of Nazi Enigma signals gave Menzies and his team enormous insight into Adolf Hitler's strategy, and this was kept a closely held secret, not only during the war, but until as late as 1974. (Frederick Winterbotham's 1974 book The Ultra Secret lifted the cloak of secrecy at last.) The Nazis had suspicions, but believed Enigma to be unbreakable, and never knew during the war that the Allies were reading a high proportion of their Wireless traffic.

Menzies kept Prime Minister Winston Churchill supplied daily with important Ultra decrypts, and the two worked together to ensure that financial resources were devoted toward research and upgrading technology at Bletchley Park, to keep pace with Nazi coding refinements, as well as directing talented workers to the massive effort, which employed nearly 10,000 workers by 1945. Bletchley's efforts were decisive in the battle against Nazi submarine warfare, which was severely threatening trans-Atlantic shipping, particularly in the first half of 1943. Britain, which was cut off from Europe after mid-1940, was almost completely dependent on North American supplies for survival. The access to Ultra was also vitally important in the battle for Normandy, leading up to D-Day in June 1944, and afterward.

Menzies has been suspected as being involved with the assassination, on 24 December 1942, of François Darlan, the Vichy military commander who defected to the Allies in Algeria. British historian David Reynolds noted in his book, In Command of History, that Menzies—who rarely left London during the war—was in Algiers around the period he was killed, making SOE (Special Operations Executive) involvement seem likely.

Menzies, who was promoted to major-general in January 1944, also supported efforts to contact anti-Nazi resistance, including Wilhelm Canaris, the anti-Hitler head of Abwehr, in Germany. Prime Minister Winston Churchill was kept informed of these efforts throughout the war, and information from and about the Nazi resistance was exploited tactically. Menzies coordinated his operations with Special Operations Executive (SOE) (although he reputedly considered them "amateurs"), British Security Coordination (BSC), Office of Strategic Services (OSS) and the Free French Forces. He was awarded the Order of the Yugoslav Crown.

== After the Second World War ==
After the war, Menzies reorganised the SIS for the Cold War. He absorbed most of SOE. He was sometimes at odds with the Labour governments. He also had to weather a scandal inside SIS after revelations that SIS officer Kim Philby was a Soviet spy.

Menzies was already the head of the service when Kim Philby joined in 1941. Nonetheless, Menzies deserved some of the blame for Soviet agents having penetrated MI6, according to Anthony Cave Brown in his book C: The Secret Life of Sir Stewart Graham Menzies, Spymaster to Winston Churchill. Cave Brown insists that Menzies's primary criteria were whether the applicants were upper-class former officers and recommended by another government department, or else were known to him personally. In his New York Times review of Brown's book, novelist Ken Follett makes this conclusion: "Mr Philby outwitted Menzies because Mr Philby was intelligent and professional and cool, where Menzies was an amiable upper-class sportsman who was out of his depth. And British intelligence, except for the code breakers, was like Menzies—amateur, anti-intellectual and wholly outclassed."

After 43 continuous years of service in the British Army, Menzies retired to Bridges Court in Luckington in rural Wiltshire at 62 in mid-1952. His success at SIS was not limited to adeptness at bureaucratic intrigue, a virtual necessity in his position; Menzies's efforts as chief had a major role in winning the Second World War, and certainly earned Churchill's trust, as evidenced by nearly 1,500 meetings with the prime minister during its duration.

== Marriages ==
Menzies's first marriage was in 1918 to Lady Avice Ela Muriel Sackville, younger daughter of Gilbert Sackville, 8th Earl De La Warr, and Lady Muriel Agnes Brassey, daughter of Thomas Brassey, 1st Earl Brassey. They were divorced in 1931.

He next married Pamela Thetis Garton (née Beckett), on 13 December 1932, fourth daughter of Rupert Evelyn Beckett by his wife Muriel Helen Florence Paget, daughter of Lord Berkeley Charles Sydney Paget, himself a younger son of the 2nd Marquess of Anglesey. Garton was an invalid for many years, suffering from clinical depression and anorexia nervosa. She had Menzies's only child.

His third marriage was in 1952 to Audrey Clara Lilian Latham, formerly wife of Sir Henry Birkin, 2nd Bt., Lord Edward Hay, and Niall Chaplin, and daughter of Sir Thomas Paul Latham, 1st Bt. Stewart and Audrey were both over age 50 at the time of their marriage, her fourth. Each had separate estates (his in Wiltshire, west of London, hers in Essex, east of London), and they for the most part lived separately, but they met in London for dinner each Wednesday.

Anthony Cave Brown also reported that Menzies had a long-standing affair with one of his secretaries, which he ended upon retirement (and presumably remarriage) in 1952; the secretary apparently tried to kill herself at that time.

Menzies died on 29 May 1968.

== Honours and awards ==

Knight Commander of The Most Honourable Order of the Bath (KCB)	7 June 1951	Had been made companion in the 1942 New Year's Honours before being promoted to Knight Commander when at the rank of Major-General.
Knight Commander of the Order of St Michael and St George (KCMG)	1 January 1943	For official services while Colonel (local Brigadier).
Distinguished Service Order (DSO)	1 December 1914	While Lieutenant of the 2nd Life Guards. For showing the greatest coolness during the attack on German position on 7 November 1914, in support of the right flank of the 4th Guards Brigade, and then again on the evening of that day.
Military Cross (MC)	3 July 1915	While Captain of the 2nd Life Guards. On 13 May 1915 near Ypres, after his commanding officer had been wounded, for displayed conspicuous ability, coolness and resource in controlling the action of his regiment and rallying the men.
1914 Star		
British War Medal		
Victory Medal		With mentioned in dispatches device.
1939–1945 Star		
War Medal 1939–1945		
King George V Coronation Medal	1911	
King George V Silver Jubilee Medal	1935	
King George VI Coronation Medal	1937	
Queen Elizabeth II Coronation Medal	1953	
Knight of the Order of the Crown (Belgium) Chevalier de I'Ordre de la Couronne	14 February 1917	
Knight of the Order of the Legion of Honour (France) Chevalier de l' Ordre National de la Legion d'Honneur	2 June 1917	
War Cross (Belgium) Croix de guerre	11 March 1918	
Commander's Cross of the Order of the Rebirth of Poland (Poland) Order Odrodzenia Polski Komandorski	8 October 1943	
War Cross 1940 with Palm (Belgium) Croix de Guerre 1940 avec Palme	16 January 1947	
Grand Officer of the Order of Leopold with Palm (Belgium) Grand officier de l'Ordre de Léopold avec Palme	16 January 1947	
Grand Officer of the Order of Orange Nassau with Swords (Netherlands) Orde van Oranje-Nassau	Royal Decree no. 34 of 13 February 1947 British Permission 14 May 1948	
Commander with Star of the Order of Saint Olav (Norway) Sanct Olavs Orden Commander with Star/Grand Officer	19 November 1948	
Commander of the Legion of Merit (United States)	28 January 1949	
Order of the Yugoslav Crown (Yugoslavia) Orden Jugoslavenske Krune		

== Notes ==
Government offices
Preceded by Sir Hugh Sinclair	Chief of the SIS; 1939–1952	Succeeded by Sir John Sinclair
