= Westonbirt School =

Coordinates: 51°36′21″N 2°11′44″W

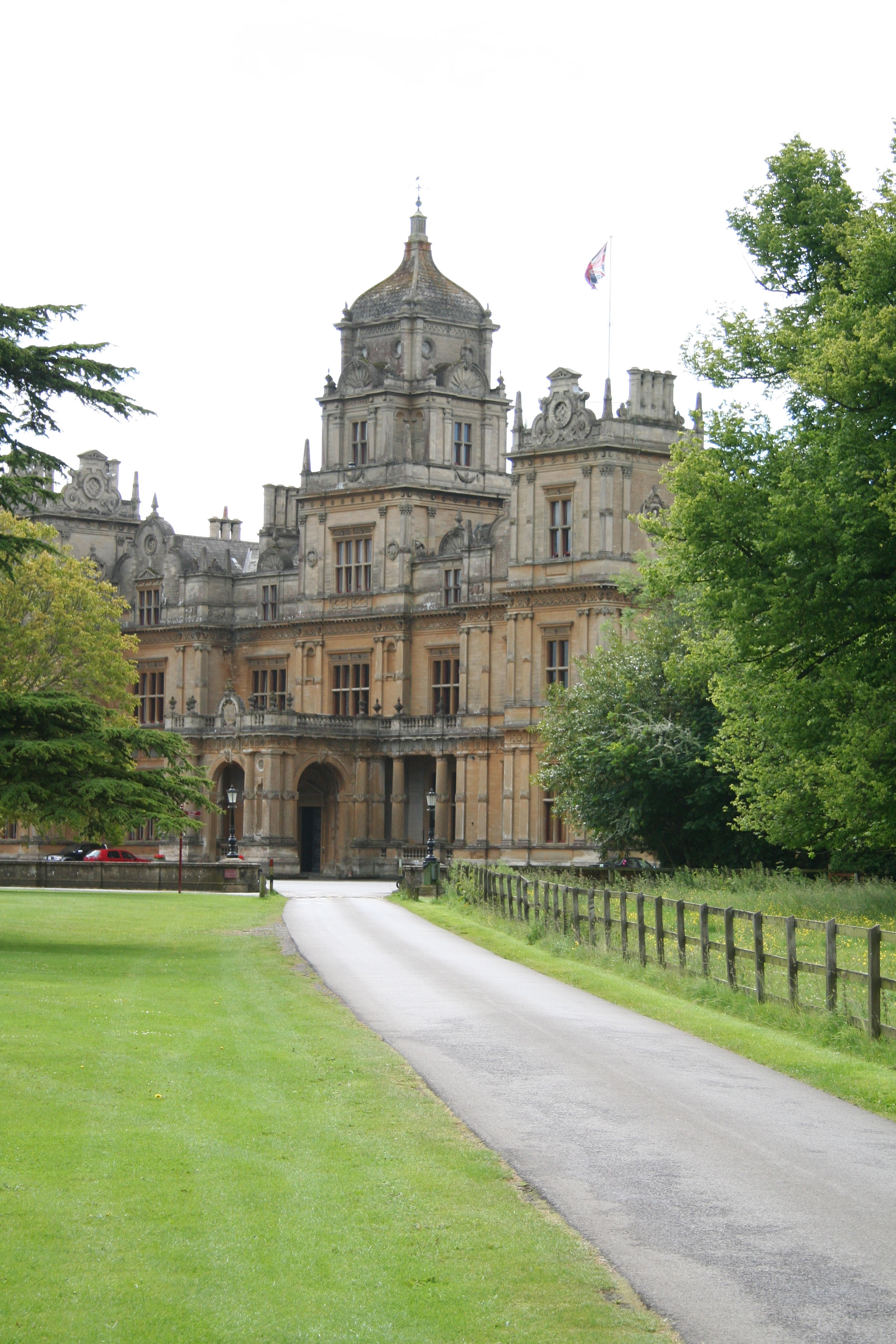
- Westonbirt House, part of the school
- Tetbury, Gloucestershire, GL8 8QG; England

Information
- Type: Private school Boarding school Day School
- Motto: "Bono malum superate" (Overcome evil with good)
- Religious affiliation: Church of England
- Established: 1928
- Founder: Eleanor Louisa Houison Craufurd
- Department for Education URN: 115789 Tables
- Headmistress: Dina Porovic
- Gender: Co-educational
- Age: 11 to 18
- Enrolment: ~800
- Colour: Red
- Website: www.westonbirt.org

Westonbirt School is a co-educational private day and boarding school for pupils aged 11 to 18 near Tetbury in Gloucestershire in South West England. It was set up in 1928 as a girls' school. The historical Westonbirt House is part of the school. Westonbirt Prep School is also on the site.

== History ==
Westonbirt School was founded by the Martyrs' Memorial and Church of England Trust (now known as the Allied Schools), which had acquired Westonbirt House and converted it into a school. During World War II, the premises were used by the Air Ministry and pupils and staff were evacuated to Wiltshire due to the Blitz. Six former pupils died during the war and a memorial scholarship was set up in their memory; children of British military personnel are entitled to discounts.

In 2002, Westonbirt acquired Querns School to become its preparatory department. Seven years later it absorbed Rose Hill School to form the prep school Rose Hill Westonbirt. In September 2013 Rose Hill Westonbirt School was renamed Westonbirt Prep School. Wishford Education, a provider of independent education in the UK, acquired Westonbirt School in 2018.

As of September 2019, Westonbirt became co-educational and accepted boys into year 7, and in years 8,9 and 12 from September 2020.

== Buildings and grounds ==
Most of the classrooms are in the courtyard, an area that was stables during the buildings' life as a stately home. Half of the sixth form dormitories are built above these classrooms. The sixth form block was completed in 2008 and is between the science block and the courtyard classrooms.

In September 2012 the Marriott Music Centre was opened. This was designed by Bath-based architects DKA and built by Steele Davis between April and August 2012.

The main school building is centred on the reception and the great hall, which has a marble fireplace and large organ overlooked by a balcony.

In 2005 a new sports hall was opened by the Prince of Wales and Duchess of Cornwall. It has a 25m swimming pool, courts and a gym, which is open to members of the public.

The grounds include a lake, amphitheatre, grotto, fountains and a set of Italianate gardens. Many of the fields around the school are rented out to farmers for cattle grazing or are used to keep horses either belonging to the local stables or to the pupils themselves. The school now owns the church, St. Catherine's, which is within the grounds and which was originally the local parish church; Westonbirt pupils attend the church regularly.

The school has a conservatory known as the Orangery which includes a stage and balcony used for school ceremonies and drama productions. A basement contains the costume wardrobe where dramatic costumes and props are kept, originally the house's bomb shelter during World War II.

== See also ==
- Westonbirt Arboretum

== Notable former pupils ==
- Maxine Audley, actress
- Lady Georgia Byng, children's author, educator, illustrator, actress and film producer.
- Pamela Carruthers (1916–2009), showjumping course designer
- Betty Clay (née Baden-Powell), scout and guides leader
- Lady Emily Compton, fashion model, stylist, and magazine editor
- Sheila Denning, painter
- Angela Flowers, art gallerist
- Baroness Garden, politician & Deputy Speaker of the House of Lords
- Anne Grosvenor, Duchess of Westminster (née Sullivan), race-horse owner, in particular the steeplechaser Arkle
- Anna Hornby, artist
- June Jacobs, peace activist and campaigner for Soviet Jews
- Chitpas Kridakorn, Member of the Thai House of Representatives
- Diana Lamplugh, Charity founder and campaigner (1936-2011)
- Patricia Llewellyn, television producer, businesswoman
- Aileen McCorkell, the founder and first president of the British Red Cross branch in Derry
- Mercia MacDermott, historian, writer
- Natasha Rufus Isaacs, socialite, co-founder of Beulah London
- Honor Salmon (née Pitman) (1912-1943), Air Transport Auxiliary Pilot
- (Susan) Pamela Rose (née Gibson), Bletchley Park translator, actress, teacher & NSPCC vice-president. Sister of Lord Gibson, married to Jim Rose
- Julia Quinn, romance author of Bridgerton series
- Jane Sinclair, priest
- Salma Sobhan, Bangladeshi barrister, human rights activist
- Patsy Toh, Chinese pianist
- Ruth Watson, hotelier, food critic, broadcaster
- Caroline Stanbury, British businesswoman and reality television personality
