= Westonbirt Arboretum =

Arboretum in Gloucestershire

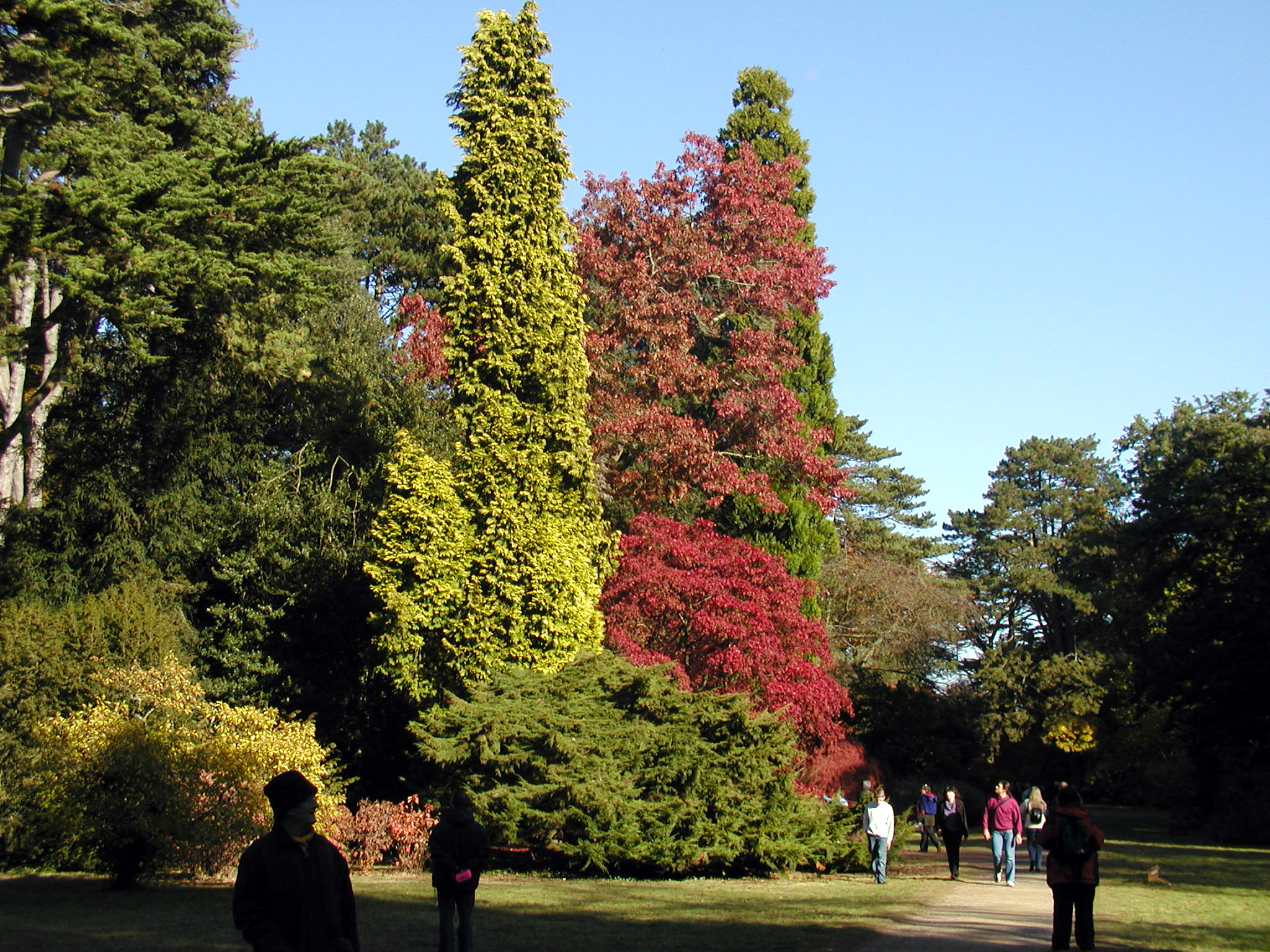
- An autumn scene at the arboretum

- Location within Gloucestershire
- Type: Arboretum
- Location: Tetbury, Gloucestershire
- Coordinates: 51°36′22″N 2°13′05″W
- Created: 1829
- Operator: Forestry England
- Designation: Grade I
- Website: www.forestryengland.uk/westonbirt-the-national-arboretum

Westonbirt, The National Arboretum is an arboretum in Gloucestershire, England, about 3 miles (5 km) southwest of the town of Tetbury. Managed by Forestry England, it is perhaps the most important and widely known arboretum in the United Kingdom.

Planted in the heyday of Victorian plant hunting in the mid-19th century as part of the Westonbirt House estate, the arboretum forms part of a site which is listed Grade I on the Register of Historic Parks and Gardens of special historic interest.

== History ==
There is evidence of coppicing at the site from 1292. First use of the name "Weston Birt" was in 1309. This was taken from Weston, a settlement to the west of Bowldown Road, and Birt from then lords of the manor, the Bret family.

The arboretum was established in 1829 by Robert Stayner Holford and was later extended by his son George Lindsay Holford. After the death of George in 1926, ownership of the arboretum passed to his nephew, Edmund Parker, 4th Earl of Morley, and eventually to the Forestry Commission in 1956 and Forestry England in 2019. The Holford family's mansion, Westonbirt House, became a girls' boarding school in 1927 when it was separated from the arboretum. Westonbirt Arboretum backs onto the Highgrove Estate of Charles III.

== Today ==
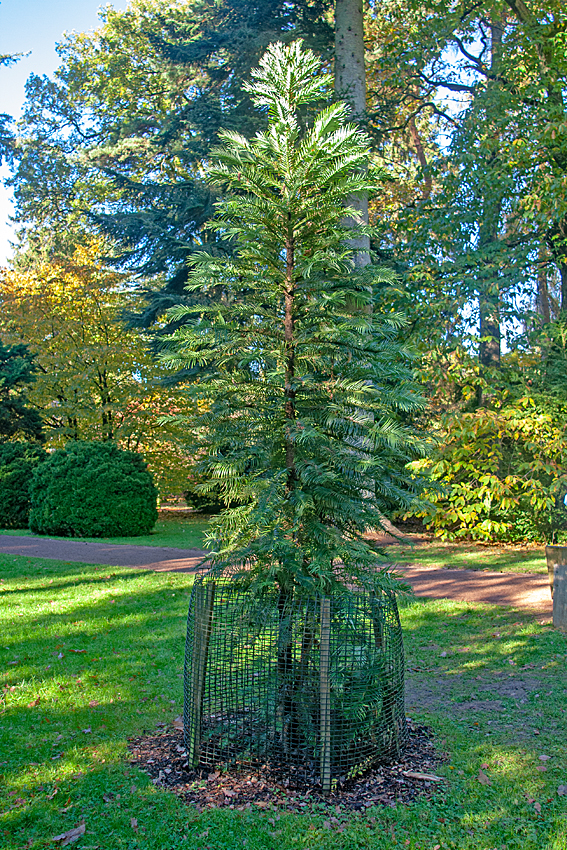
Wollemia, a critically endangered species of tree, at Westonbirt

Westonbirt Arboretum comprises approximately 15,000 trees and shrubs, with 2,500 species of tree from all over the world, covering an area of approximately 600 acres (240 ha). It has 17 miles (27 km) of hard and grassy paths. There are two main areas in the arboretum: the Old Arboretum and the Silk Wood. The Old Arboretum is where the earlier plantings were made; Silk Wood was incorporated into the arboretum later. Silk Wood also contains some exotic plantings and, at its centre, is a traditional working woodland dating from the 13th century. Dogs are allowed in Silk Wood but not in The Old Arboretum.

Throughout the arboretum, each specimen tree is labelled, either on the trunk or a low-hanging branch. Blue labels indicate Westonbirt's "champion trees", the tallest or largest of their kind in Britain; in 2011 there were 79 of these.

The arboretum is managed by Forestry England, which also manages Bedgebury Pinetum in Kent. Westonbirt Arboretum is supported by the Friends of Westonbirt Arboretum, a registered charity which formed in 1985.

The site comprises 22 hectares of coppiced coups, with a hazel (Corylus avellana) understory and common oak (Quercus robur) standard over-storey. Coppicing forms part of the Westonbirt Forest Design Plan 2021-2030 The coppice workers manage the coups as well as keeping alive ancient green woodworking skills and producing charcoal.

== Location ==
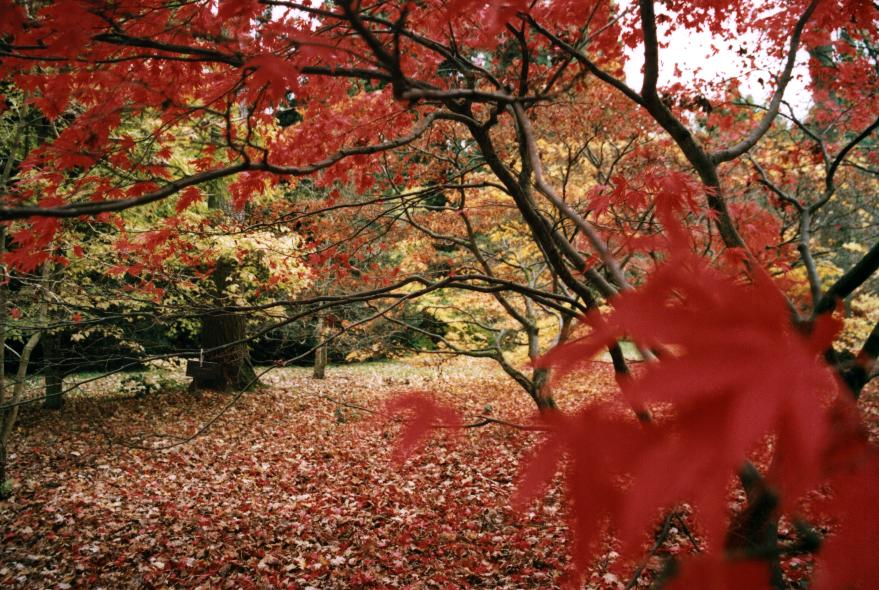
The arboretum in autumn

Westonbirt Arboretum is in Gloucestershire on the A433, approximately 3 miles (4.8 km) southwest of Tetbury, at Ordnance Survey grid reference ST 848898.

== Music and festivals ==
From 2003 to 2005 the arboretum hosted Britain's first designer-led garden festival: Westonbirt Festival of the Garden.

On 16 July 2011, Irish vocal pop band Westlife held a concert for Gravity Tour supporting their album Gravity.

Also in 2011, Treefest was launched. Following several years of the "Festival of the Tree" event, Westonbirt Arboretum refreshed the August bank holiday event with camping, music and other activities celebrating trees and nature.

Christmas and the spectacle of bare, sculpted trees in winter is celebrated at the Enchanted Christmas event. From the end of November and throughout December, an evening illuminated trail runs throughout the Old Arboretum.
