= Westonbirt House =

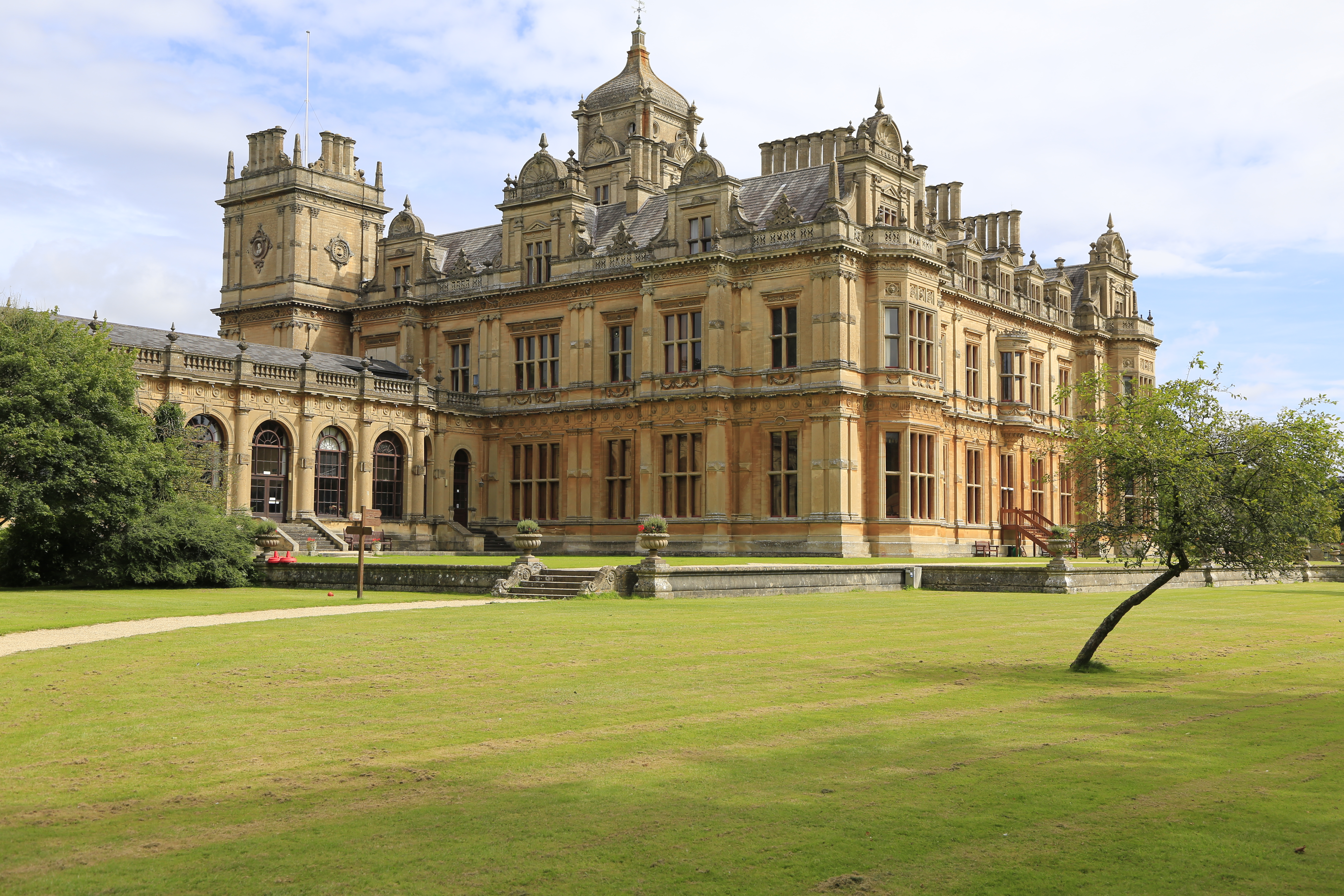
- Main façade

- Location in Gloucestershire
- 51°36′19″N 02°11′51″W
- Location: Tetbury, Gloucestershire, England

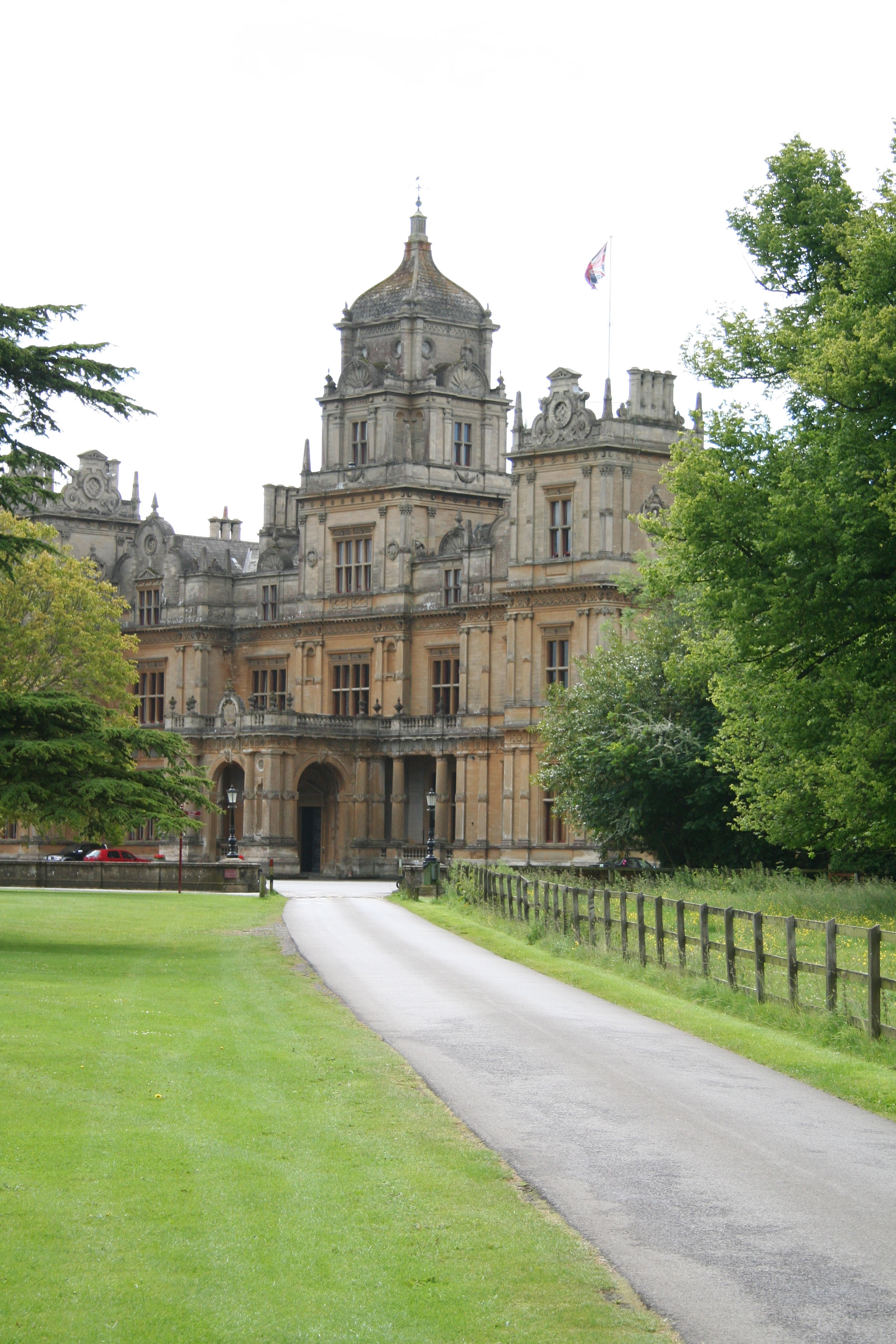
Westonbirt House in 2009

Westonbirt House is a country house in Gloucestershire, England, about 3 miles (5 km) southwest of the town of Tetbury. It belonged to the Holford family from 1665 until 1926. The first house on the site was an Elizabethan manor house. The Holfords replaced it first with a Georgian house, and then Robert Stayner Holford, who inherited Westonbirt in 1839, replaced that house between 1863 and 1870 with the present mansion which was designed by Lewis Vulliamy. He also remodelled the gardens, diverted the main road and relocated the villagers.

The house is constructed of high quality ashlar masonry on a grand scale. The exterior is in an Elizabethan style, with a symmetrical main block and asymmetric wings, one of them containing a conservatory. The interiors are in a sumptuous classical style. The house was fitted with the latest technology such as gas lighting, central heating, fireproof construction and iron roofs. It is a Grade I listed building.

Extensive formal terrace gardens were created around the house and 25 acres (100,000 m^{2}) of ornamental woodlands were planted in the 19th century. Since 1928, the house has been occupied by Westonbirt School boarding school, except during World War II when it was requisitioned by the Air Ministry. Westonbirt House is open to the public on certain days, and the gardens are open more frequently. The house is also licensed to hold civil ceremonies and is used as a wedding venue.

== Robert Stayner Holford and Mary Anne Holford ==
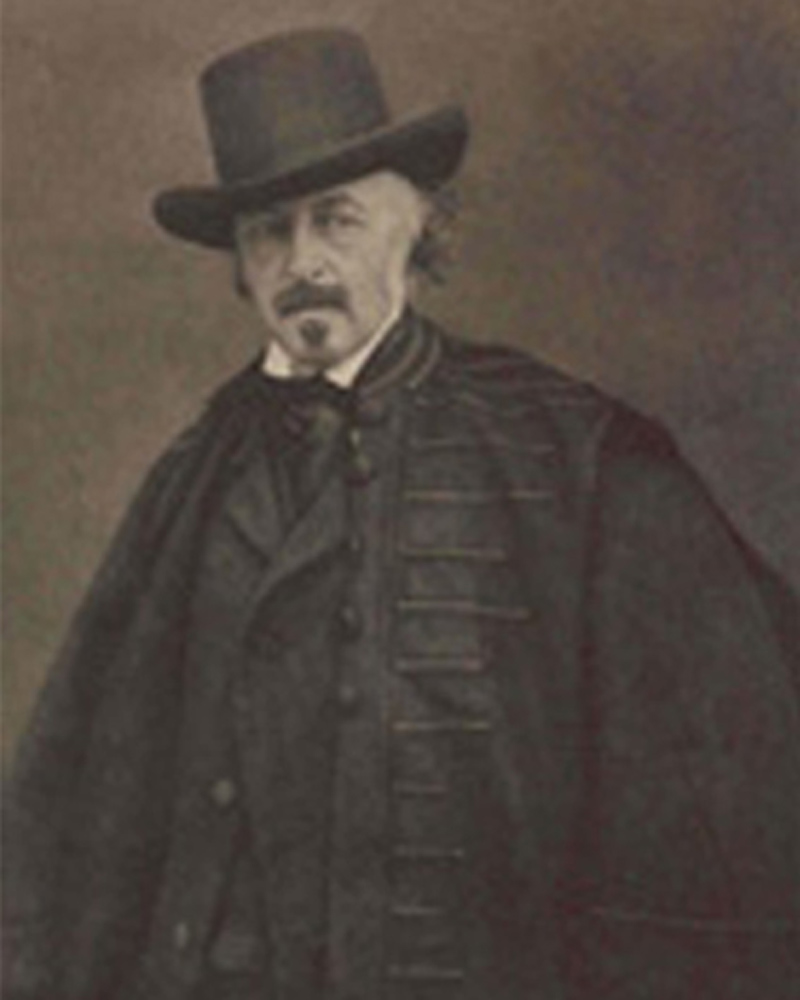
Robert Stayner Holford circa 1860

Robert was born in 1808 to George Peter Holford and his wife Anne Daniell, daughter of Rev. Averell Daniell of Lifford, County Donegal, Ireland. George inherited a mansion at Westonbirt from his father, Peter Holford; it was the original manor erected in the reign of Elizabeth I or the early part of the time of James I. That house was demolished by Holford in 1818 and a new house built in 1823.

In 1829, at the age of 21, Robert graduated from Oriel College, Oxford with a Bachelor of Arts degree. In the same year the arboretum on the Westonbirt Estate was commenced and Robert played a significant role in this project. In 1838 he inherited his uncle's fortune of over one million pounds. In the following year his father died and he became the owner of Westonbirt House. He was a keen lover of art and literature and his enormous wealth now allowed him to indulge this interest. He began collecting paintings and books for what was to become the famous "Holford Collection". To accommodate this collection he built Dorchester House in Park Lane, London between 1851 and 1853 where he employed Lewis Vulliamy as the architect.

During this time he became a Magistrate for Gloucester and Wilts and in 1843 was the High Sheriff of Wiltshire. In December 1854 he was first elected as the Member of Parliament for Gloucestershire East. In August 1854, at the age of 46, he married Mary Anne Lindsay who was the 25-year-old daughter of Lieutenant-General James Lindsay.

Between 1863 and 1870, Robert built the present Westonbirt house, which was reputed to be one of the most expensive houses constructed in the Victorian era.

Robert continued his work as a member of parliament until 1872 when he retired. He continued to collect plants for the garden at Westonbirt House and also for the arboretum. His son George also developed an interest in gardens and plants and assisted his father with this work.

After Robert's retirement, the couple spent time at both Westonbirt and Dorchester House. In 1875 Charles Gayard, a French diplomat, visited Westonbirt and gave an account of his experience as follows.

This morning I have lost no time. Sometimes Mrs Holford, sometimes Evy, took me about the house, which surpasses in magnificence any that you know. There is a hall, a sort of conservatory three stories high, something like the great apartments of Louis XIV. The most original room in the house is the one painted by Mrs Holford, in a bizarre fanciful style, something between Delacroix landscape and Rouen pottery.

After luncheon my friends took me on a pony chaise, across the beauties of the park to the keeper's lodge. I saw conservatories without end, then a lake, a bit of a wild, heaps of rocks that it seems have been newly brought there. And the lake too is a thing of yesterday. The pheasants were so thick we fairly trod on them. At last we reached the Head-keeper's lodge, and saw a pack of thirty spaniels with legs short enough to make the rabbits dance for joy.

The garden at Westonbirt House and the Arboretum continued to expand and in 1886 an extensive article was written about it in The Garden. This said that "Mr Holford's aim has been to create variety without confusion, informality and picturesqueness without losing sight of that polish in the vicinity of the mansion which must always be regarded as in accordance with correct taste."

In February 1892, Robert died at Dorchester House.

== Sir George Holford and Lady Holford ==
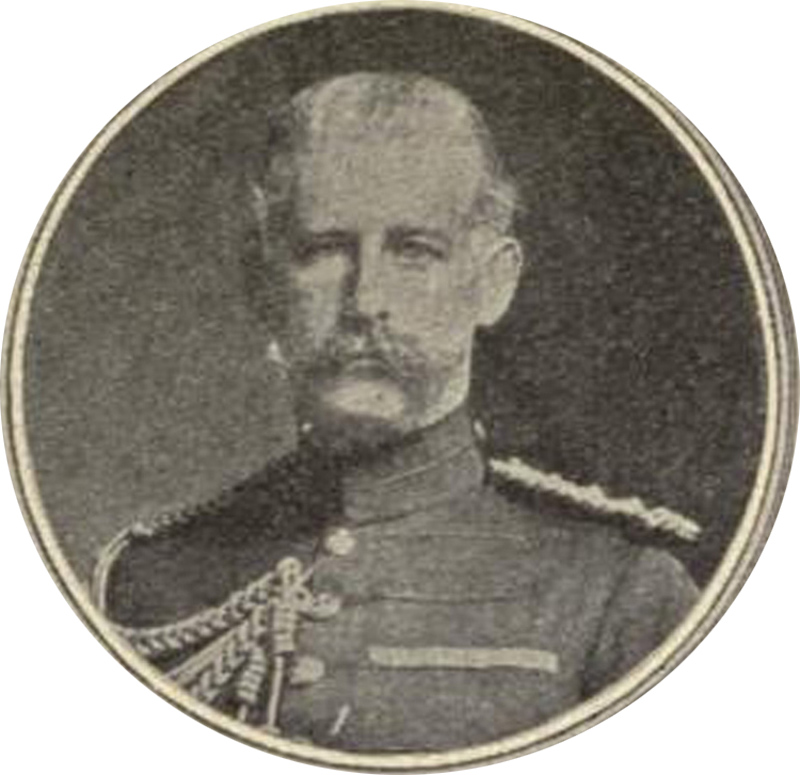
Sir George Holford circa 1910

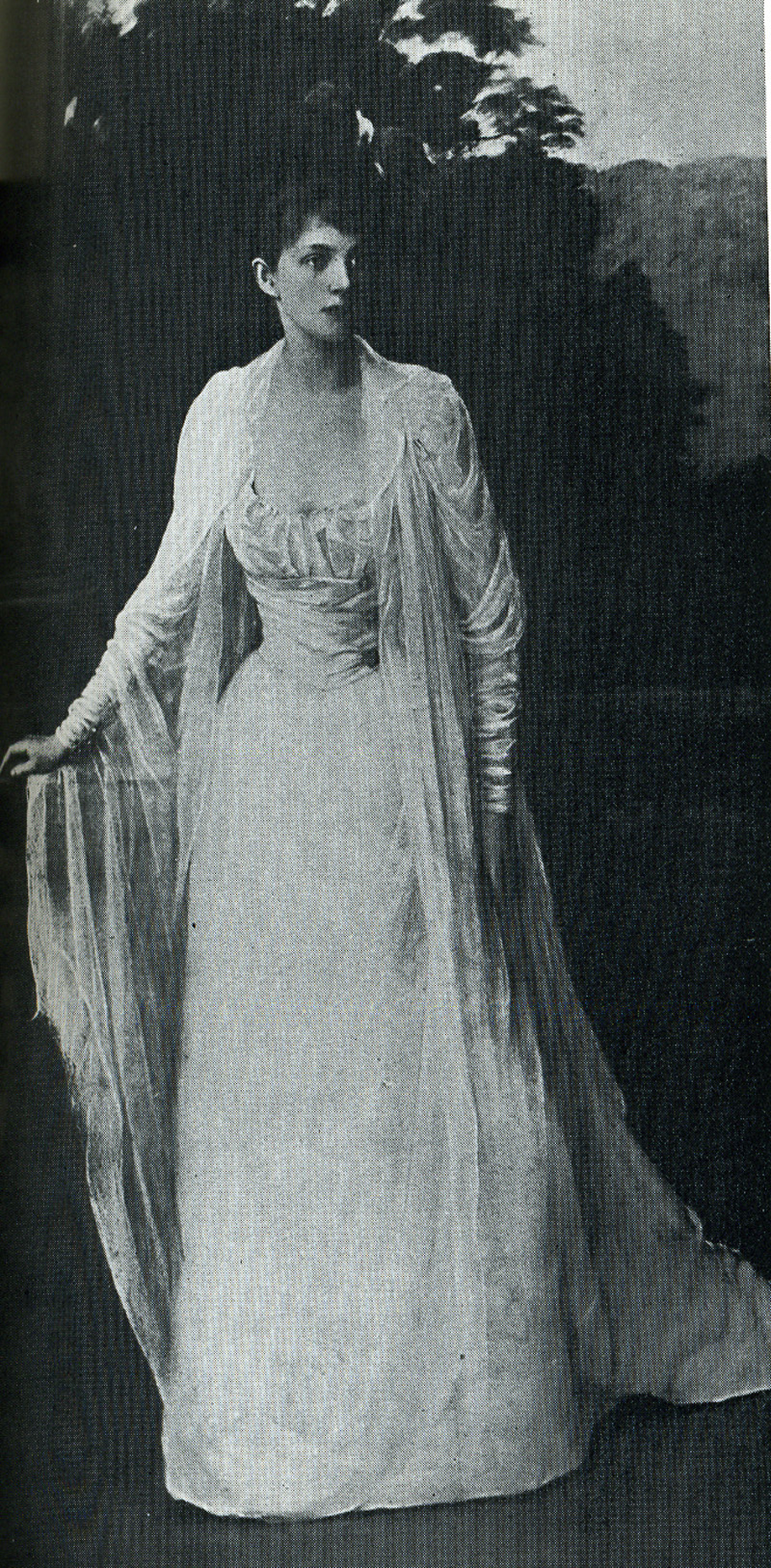
Lady Holford circa 1890

George was the only son of Robert and Mary Holford. In 1873 he went to Eton and was there for four years. At the age of 20 in 1880 George obtained a commission with the 1st Life Guards, where he remained for almost 30 years. He was closely associated with royalty and court life, and from 1888 to 1892 he was equerry to Prince Albert, Duke of Clarence.

When Robert Holford died in 1892, George inherited Westonbirt House and Arboretum. He also inherited Dorchester House in London and the art and book collection that were housed within it. He did not have his father's interest in art and books but he did have a passion for gardens and orchids so he devoted much of his time to his property at Westonbirt. The Times made the following comment about him.

He was indeed, one of the most successful amateur gardeners of the time, and though famous as a grower of orchids, amaryllids and Javanese rhododendrons, his garden and estate show a wide catholicity of taste. The arrangement of the many rare and exotic trees there and the skilful use of evergreen species as background and to provide the shelter so needful in a cold district like the Cotswolds, have rarely been equalled; there is no crowding of the trees; each is able to show its true form and all have been well cared for. On few estates has the autumnal colouring of deciduous tress been so cleverly used by harmony and contrast, as, for instance, in the planting of Norway maples and glaucous Atlantic cedars.

Country Life magazine wrote extensive articles about Westonbirt Gardens and Arboretum in 1905 and again in 1907 when George was the owner of the estate. They outlined in detail the beauty of the gardens and made the comment.

Captain Holford has carried on the work in the same spirit and with the same tradition (as his father) and Westonbirt is now more luxuriant and more beautiful than the late Mr Holford ever knew it. The gardens have been planted not to give an effect for one season only but to be invested with beauty at every time of the year.

Although he was always considered an eligible bachelor, George did not marry until late in life and had no children. In 1912 he married the recently widowed Susannah Menzies, the eldest child of Arthur and Mary Wilson. The Wilsons were a wealthy family who had made their money from a shipping line.

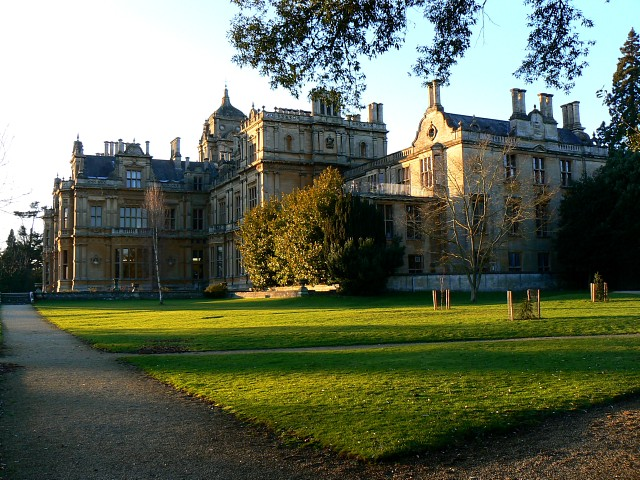
From the south-east

In 1926 George Holford died, having suffered for some time with emphysema. As he did not have any heirs his property passed to his blood relatives in accordance with the will of his father. The main part of the estate went to George's nephew the 4th Earl of Morley. However, Susannah was well provided for as George left her his personal goods such as jewellery and furniture and a large annuity of £10,000 per annum. Susannah remained at Westonbirt until it was sold in 1927, when she moved to London.

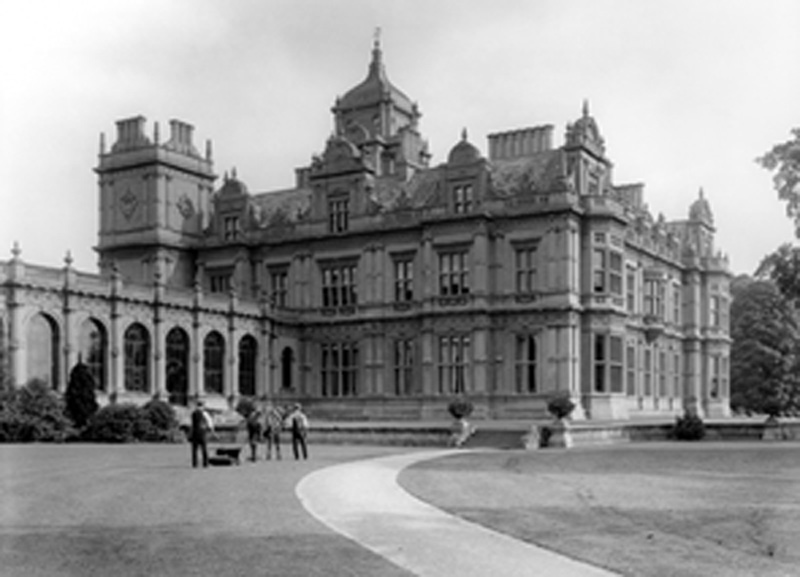
Westonbirt House in 1905

== Arboretum ==
Robert Stayner Holford, the rebuilder of Westonbirt, also founded the Westonbirt Arboretum on former common downland across the road from the house, a mile away. The arboretum was developed over the next few decades by him and his son Sir George Lindsay Holford. Since the younger Holford did not have children, the house and arboretum passed to his eldest sister's son the 4th Earl of Morley, who sold the house by 1928. The family gave the arboretum to the nation in 1956.

== The estate today ==
The gardens and surrounding parkland, together with the arboretum, were listed Grade I on the Register of Historic Parks and Gardens of special historic interest in 1986. Westonbirt School and its preparatory school are on the site. The school's leisure centre and golf course can be accessed by the public.

Westonbirt Arboretum is managed by Forestry England and is open to the public on a regular basis.

== Sources ==
- Mark Girouard, The Victorian Country House (1979) ISBN 0-300-02390-1
- Nicholas Mander, Country Houses of the Cotswolds (Aurum Press, 2008)
