= Ducie =

Ducie may refer to:

People

- Earl of Ducie, title in the Peerage of the United Kingdom
  - Barons Ducie, see Earl of Ducie
- Sir Robert Ducie, 1st Baronet (1575-c.1634)
- Henry George Francis Reynolds-Moreton, 2nd Earl of Ducie (1802-1853)
- Henry Reynolds-Moreton, 3rd Earl of Ducie (1827-1921)
- David Leslie Moreton, 7th Earl of Ducie (born 1951)
- Henry Ducie Chads (1788-1868), officer in the British Royal Navy

Places

- Ducie Island, Pitcairn Islands
- Ducie River, Queensland, Australia

== See also ==
- Ducey
- Doocy
- Doocey
