= Guise baronets of Highnam (1783) =

Baronetcy in the Baronetage of Great Britain

Escutcheon of the Guise baronets of Highnam

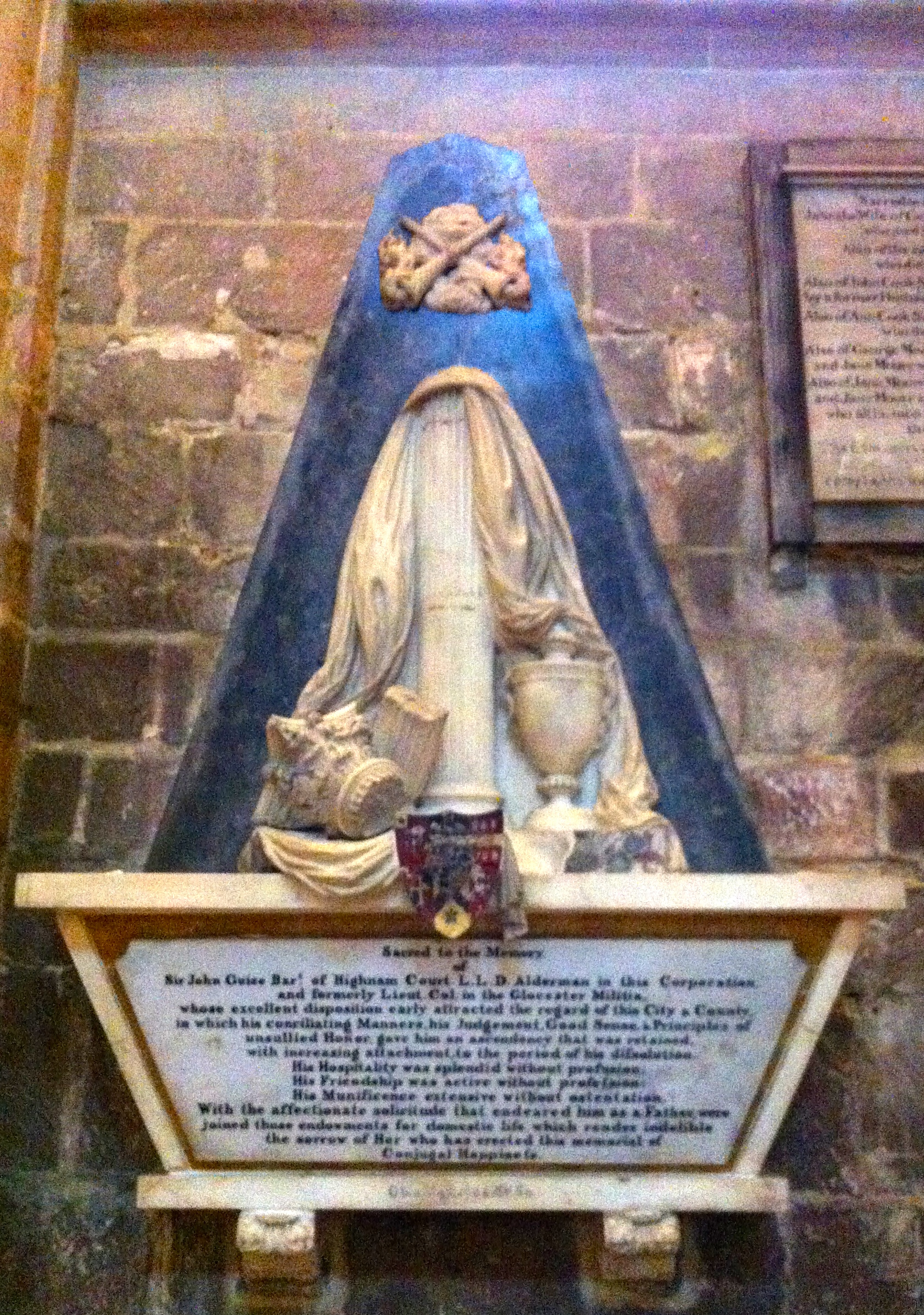
Monument to Sir John Guise, 1st Baronet, of Highnam, in Gloucester Cathedral

The Guise baronetcy, of Highnam Court in the County of Gloucester, was created in the Baronetage of Great Britain on 9 December 1783 for John Guise, the cousin and heir male of the 5th and last Baronet of the 1661 creation who had died that year. He was the great-grandson of Henry Guise, younger brother of the 1st Baronet.

The 2nd Baronet sat as MP for Gloucestershire and Gloucestershire East. The 3rd Baronet, his brother General Sir John Wright Guise, 3rd Baronet, commanded a Guards battalion in the Peninsular War.

The 4th, 5th, and 6th Baronets all served as High Sheriff of Gloucestershire.

== Guise baronets, of Highnam (1783) ==
- Sir John Guise, 1st Baronet (1733–1794)
- Sir Berkeley William Guise, 2nd Baronet (1775–1834)
- General Sir John Wright Guise, 3rd Baronet GCB (1777–1865)
- Sir William Vernon Guise, 4th Baronet (1816–1887)
- Sir William Francis George Guise, 5th Baronet (1851–1920)
- Sir Anselm William Edward Guise, 6th Baronet (1888–1970)
- Sir John Grant Guise, 7th Baronet (1927–2007)
- Sir (Christopher) James Guise, 8th Baronet (1930–2022)
- Sir Anselm Mark Guise, 9th Baronet (born 1971)

== Arms ==
In 1863 the 3rd Baronet was granted heraldic supporters, usually only borne by peers, to descend to heirs male on succession to the baronetcy. The motto is Quo honestior eo tutior, The more honest, the more safe.

== Notes ==
Baronetage of Great Britain
Preceded by Sykes baronets	Guise baronets of Highnam; 9 December 1783	Succeeded by Hamond baronets
