= Henry Reynolds-Moreton =

Henry Reynolds-Moreton may refer to:

- Henry Reynolds-Moreton, 2nd Earl of Ducie (1802–1853), British Whig politician, agriculturalist and cattle breeder
- Henry Reynolds-Moreton, 3rd Earl of Ducie (1827–1921), British courtier and Liberal Party politician
- Henry Reynolds-Moreton, Lord Moreton (1857–1920), British Liberal Party politician
