= Ducey =

Ducey may refer to:

- Ducey (surname), includes a list of people with the name
- Ducey-Les Chéris, a commune in France
- Ducey, Manche, a village and former commune in France, now part of Ducey-Les Chéris
- Ducey's Bass Lake Lodge, a lodge in Bass Lake, California
- Elizabeth Ducey House, a house in Portland, Oregon
- John Ducey Park, a baseball stadium in Edmonton, Alberta

== See also ==
- Doocy
- Doocey
- Ducie (disambiguation)
