= Robert Stayner Holford =

Wealthy English landowner and MP

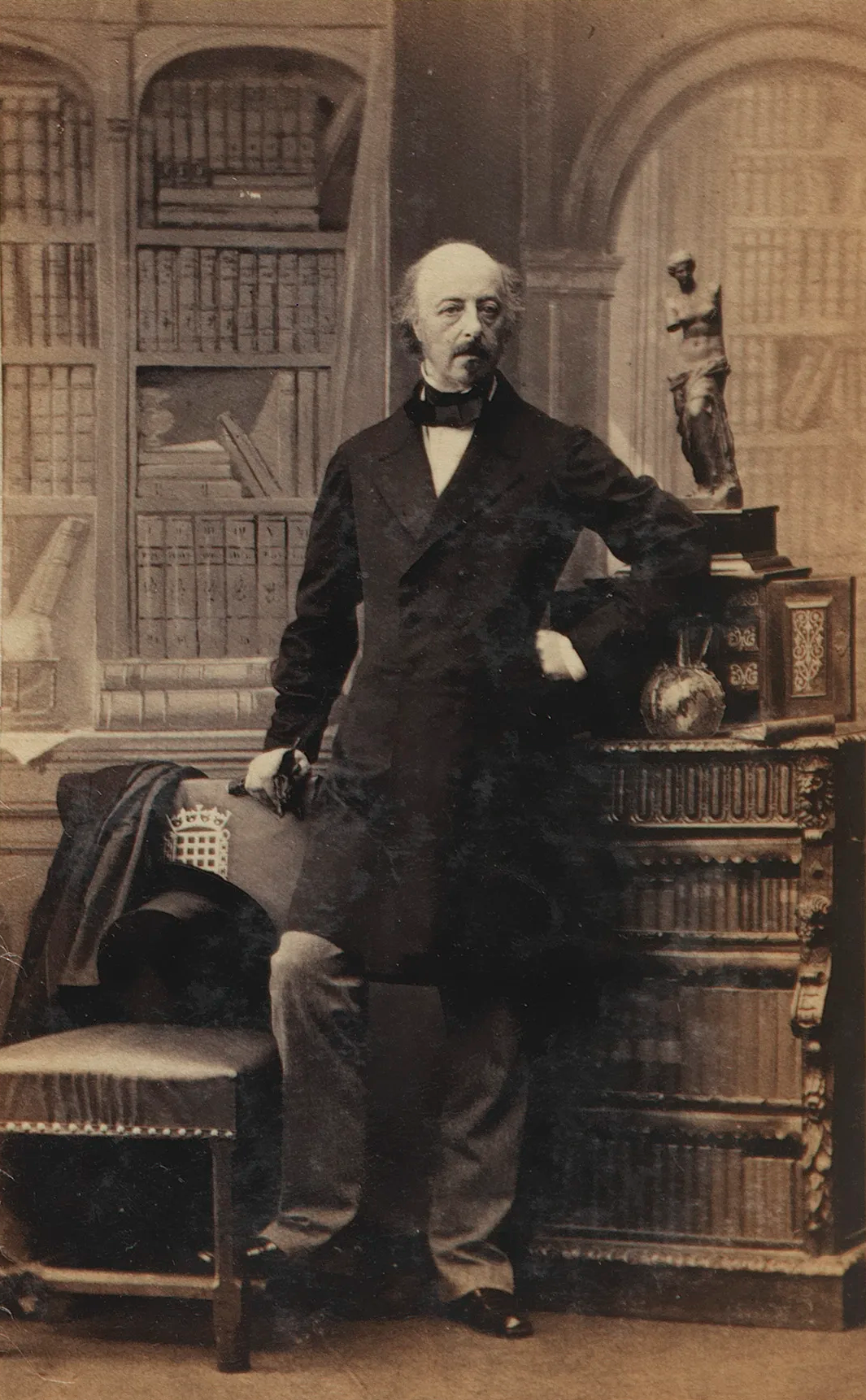
Portrait by Camille Silvy, 1861

Robert Stayner Holford (1808–1892), of Westonbirt, in the village of Weston Birt, Gloucestershire, MP for East Gloucestershire, was a wealthy landowner, gardening and landscaping enthusiast, and an art collector. With his vast wealth, he rebuilt Westonbirt House from the Georgian mansion erected only decades earlier by his father, and founded the Westonbirt Arboretum after succeeding his uncle and father between 1838 and 1839. His London home was Dorchester House.

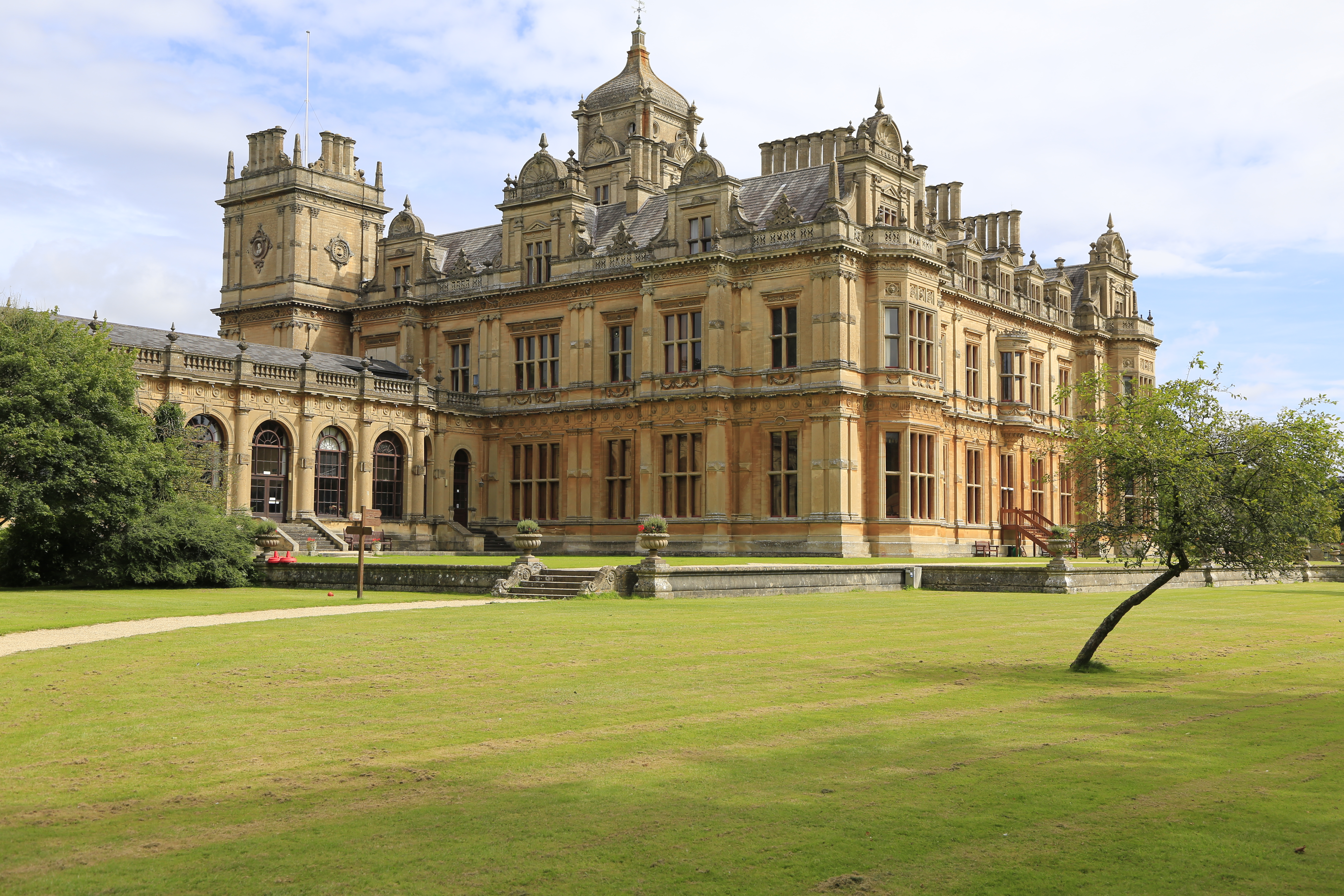
Garden front of Westonbirt House

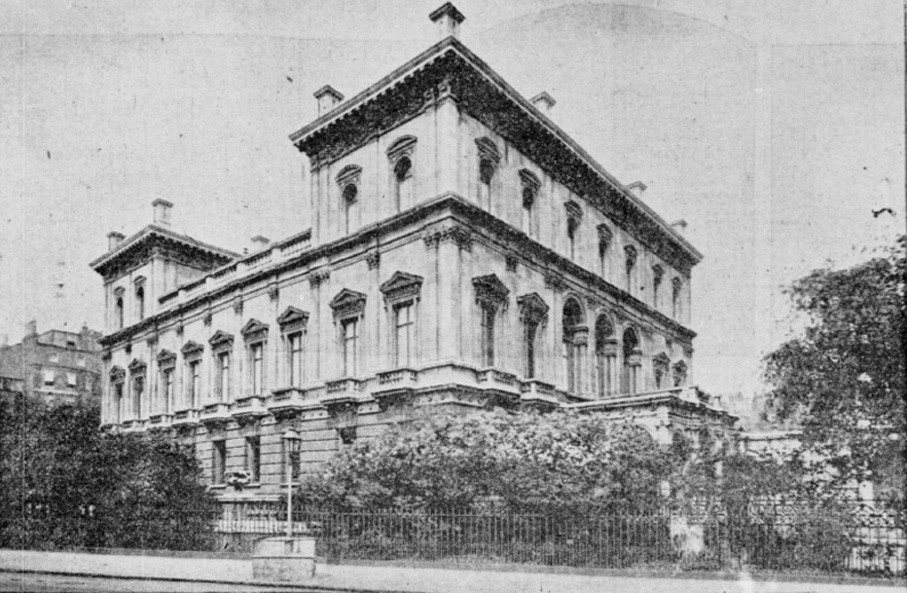
Dorchester House, Park Lane, London, in 1905

Holford served as MP for East Gloucestershire from 1854 when he was elected in a by-election on 19 December on the death of the member Sir Michael Hicks Beach, 8th Baronet (d. 22 November 1854), and continued in that office for eighteen years. He was re-elected in 1857 with Sir Christopher William Codrington and again in 1859 with Codrington (who died 1864 forcing another by-election). He was re-elected in 1864 with the new member Sir Michael Hicks-Beach, 9th Bt. (son of the previous MP). In 1872, he vacated the seat.

== Family ==
Holford was the son of George Peter Holford (d. 1839), himself the second son of Peter Holford (d. 1804) The Holfords had been seated at Westonbirt since 1666 when a Holford married the heiress Sarah Crew. Robert inherited the fortune of his uncle and namesake Robert Holford (d. 1838) of over one million pounds and in 1839 he inherited Westonbirt House from his father.

Holford married Mary Anne Lindsay, a daughter of Lt. General Sir James Lindsay of Balcarres (himself grandson of James Lindsay, 5th Earl of Balcarres) by his second wife Anne Trotter, daughter of Sir Coutts Trotter, 1st Baronet. (Mary Anne's sister Margaret had married their second cousin Alexander Lindsay, 25th Earl of Crawford). Holford and his wife had the following children

1. Sir George Lindsay Holford (1860–1926) who married Susannah West Menzies (1865–1943), daughter of Arthur Wilson of Tranby Croft, widow of John Graham Menzies (1861–1911), mother of Major-General Sir Stewart Menzies.
2. Margaret Holford (d. 9 February 1908) who married on 17 June 1876 Albert Parker, 3rd Earl of Morley, and had three sons and one daughter. The two elder sons succeeded to the earldom as 4th and 5th Earls, and a third son was father of the 6th and most recent Earl of Morley. These collateral successions necessitated death duties and also meant sale of the family estates, including Westonbirt House and eventually Saltram House.
  1. Edmund Robert Parker, 4th Earl of Morley (19 April 1877 – 10 October 1951) who inherited Westonbirt from his maternal uncle and sold the house shortly thereafter. He died unmarried, and was succeeded by his next brother.
  2. Montagu Brownlow Parker, 5th Earl of Morley (13 October 1878 – 28 April 1962), who succeeded his older brother in 1951 and also died unmarried, being succeeded by his nephew.
  3. Hon. John Holford Parker (22 June 1886 – 27 February 1955), married the Hon. Marjory Katherine Elizabeth Alexandra St Aubyn, daughter of the Baron St Levan. Their eldest son, John St Aubyn Parker (b. 29 May 1923), became the 6th Earl of Morley, and has one son.
3. Alice Holford (d. 22 September 1944) who married on 9 June 1877 Albert Grey, 4th Earl Grey (1851–1917), and had five children, one of whom died in early childhood.
  1. Lady Victoria Mary Sybil Grey (9 June 1878 – 3 February 1907) married Arthur Morton Grenfell in 1901, and left children
  2. 5th Earl Grey (15 December 1879 – 2 April 1963), who had two daughters by his wife Lady Mabel Laura Georgiana Palmer. The elder daughter Mary (1907–2002) married the 1st Baron Howick of Glendale.
  3. Lady Sybil Grey (15 July 1882 – 4 June 1966) O.B.E. married Lambert William Middleton (1877–1941) of Lowood House, Melrose, Scotland, nephew of Sir Arthur Middleton, 7th Baronet, and Frederick Edmund Meredith. She was invested as an Officer, Order of the British Empire in 1918, having served as the Commandant of the Dorchester House Hospital for Officers. She was well known for her work with the Red Cross in Russia during World War I, and for her work with tuberculosis sufferers (founding the Lady Grey Society). She was an amateur photographer and filmmaker of note, and recorded village life at Darnick and St. Boswells . After her husband died she sold Lowood House and moved to Burley, Hampshire. They were the parents of a son and a daughter.
  4. Evelyn Grey, married L.E. Jones
4. Evelyn Holford (1856–1943) who married the art collector, banker, and art patron Robert Henry Benson (1850–1929), and had children. Their daughter Margaret Winifred Benson married 1915 Major General Sir Hereward Wake, 13th Bt. and had children, including the present baronet. The eldest son Guy Holford Benson (1888–1975) married 1921 Lady Violet Elcho (1888–1971), widow of Lord Elcho, and 2nd daughter of the 8th Duke of Rutland, and had three sons. Another son Constantine Evelyn Benson, a financier, married Lady Morvyth Lilian Ward, daughter of the 2nd Earl of Dudley, and had children including Lady Tompkins (d. 2003).

== Notes ==
Parliament of the United Kingdom
| Preceded by Sir Michael Hicks Beach, 8th Bt. Sir Christopher William Codrington | Member of Parliament for East Gloucestershire; 1854 – 1872; With: Sir Christopher William Codrington to 1864; Sir Michael Hicks Beach, 9th Bt. from 1864 | Succeeded by Sir Michael Hicks Beach, 9th Bt. John Yorke |
Honorary titles
| Preceded by Thomas Henry Kingscote | High Sheriff of Gloucestershire; 1843 | Succeeded by Joseph Yorke |
