= Mary Anne Holford =

British novelist and playwright

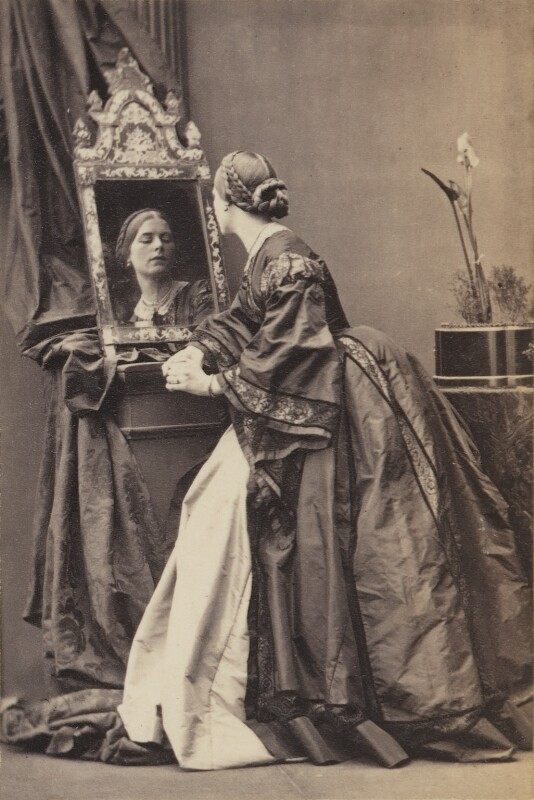
- Born: 1829
- Died: 13 February 1901 (aged 71–72)
- Occupation: Novelist
- Spouse(s): Robert Stayner Holford
- Children: Margaret Holford, Countess of Morley, George Holford, Alice Holford
- Parent(s): James Lindsay; Anne Trotter
- Family: Coutts Lindsay, Robert Loyd-Lindsay, 1st Baron Wantage, Margaret Lindsay

Mary Anne "Maysie" Lindsay Holford (1829 – 13 February 1901) was a British novelist and playwright.

Mary Anne Holford was born in 1829, the daughter of Lieutenant General Sir James Lindsay, MP for Wigan, and Anne Trotter. She married Robert Stayner Holford, MP for East Gloucestershire, in 1854.

Her play, a comedic drama called The Republican Marriage, premiered at the Olympic Theatre in November 1878, starring Marion Terry and Herbert Beerbohm Tree. She also published a novel, Strathrowan, in 1879.

Mary Anne Holford died on 13 February 1901.

== Bibliography ==
- Strathrowan: A Tale of Modern Life. 3 vol. London: Chapman and Hall, 1879.
