= Earl of Ducie =

Earldom in the Peerage of the United Kingdom

- Blazon Arms: Quarterly: 1st & 4th, Argent, a Chevron Gules, between three square Buckles Sable (Moreton); 2nd & 3rd, Or, two Lions passant guardant Gules (Ducie). Crest: A Moorcock’s Head Or, combed and wattled Gules, between two Wings displayed Azure. Supporters: On either side a Unicorn Argent, armed, unguled, maned and tufted Or, gorged with a Ducal Coronet per pale Gold and Gules.
- Creation date: 28 January 1837
- Created by: King William IV
- Peerage: Peerage of the United Kingdom
- First holder: Thomas Reynolds-Moreton, 1st Earl of Ducie
- Present holder: David Leslie Moreton, 7th Earl of Ducie
- Heir apparent: James Moreton, Lord Moreton
- Remainder to: the 1st Earl’s heirs male of the body lawfully begotten
- Subsidiary titles: Baron Ducie; Baron Moreton
- Status: Extant
- Motto: PERSEVERANDO (By persevering)

Earl of Ducie is a title in the Peerage of the United Kingdom. It was created in 1837 for Thomas Reynolds Moreton, 4th Baron Ducie.

== History ==
The Moreton family descends from Edward Moreton, who in the 17th century married Elizabeth, daughter of Robert Ducie. Their son Matthew-Ducie Moreton represented Gloucestershire in the House of Commons. In 1720 he was raised to the Peerage of Great Britain as Baron Ducie de Moreton, in the County of Stafford. He was succeeded by his son, the second Baron. He was also a Member of Parliament and served as Lord-Lieutenant of Gloucestershire. In 1763 he was created Baron Ducie, of Tortworth in the County of Gloucester, with remainder to the sons of his sister Elizabeth Reynolds. This title was also in the Peerage of Great Britain.

On his death in 1770 the barony of 1720 became extinct. He was succeeded in the barony of 1763 according to the special remainder by his nephew, the second Baron. He assumed the surname of Moreton by Lord Ducie's Name Act 1771 (11 Geo. 3. c. 24 Pr.). He died childless and was succeeded by his younger brother, Francis Reynolds-Moreton, 3rd Baron Ducie, a notable naval commander. He had earlier represented Lancaster in Parliament. Lord Ducie assumed the surname of Moreton by Lord Ducie's Name Act 1786 (26 Geo. 3. c. 10 Pr.). The remote Ducie Island in the South Pacific is named after him. He was succeeded by his son, the fourth Baron. In 1837 he was created Baron Moreton, of Tortworth in the County of Gloucester, and Earl of Ducie. These titles are in the Peerage of the United Kingdom.

His son, the second Earl, represented Gloucestershire and Gloucestershire East in the House of Commons. He was succeeded by his eldest son, the third Earl. He was a Liberal politician and served as Captain of the Yeomen of the Guard from 1859 to 1866 under Lord Palmerston and Lord Russell. His only son Henry Reynolds-Moreton, Lord Moreton, sat as Member of Parliament for Gloucestershire West. However, he predeceased his father and on Lord Ducie's death the titles passed to his younger brother, the fourth Earl. He was a sheep and cattle farmer in Queensland, Australia, and also held several political offices in the state government. His son, the fifth Earl, was a dairy and fruit farmer in Australia. He was succeeded by his nephew, the sixth Earl. He was the son of Algernon Howard Moreton, second son of the fourth Earl. As of 2010 the titles are held by his eldest son, the seventh Earl, who succeeded in 1991.

Augustus Macdonald (who assumed the surname of Macdonald in lieu of Moreton), younger son of the first Earl, was a politician and writer.

== Family seat ==
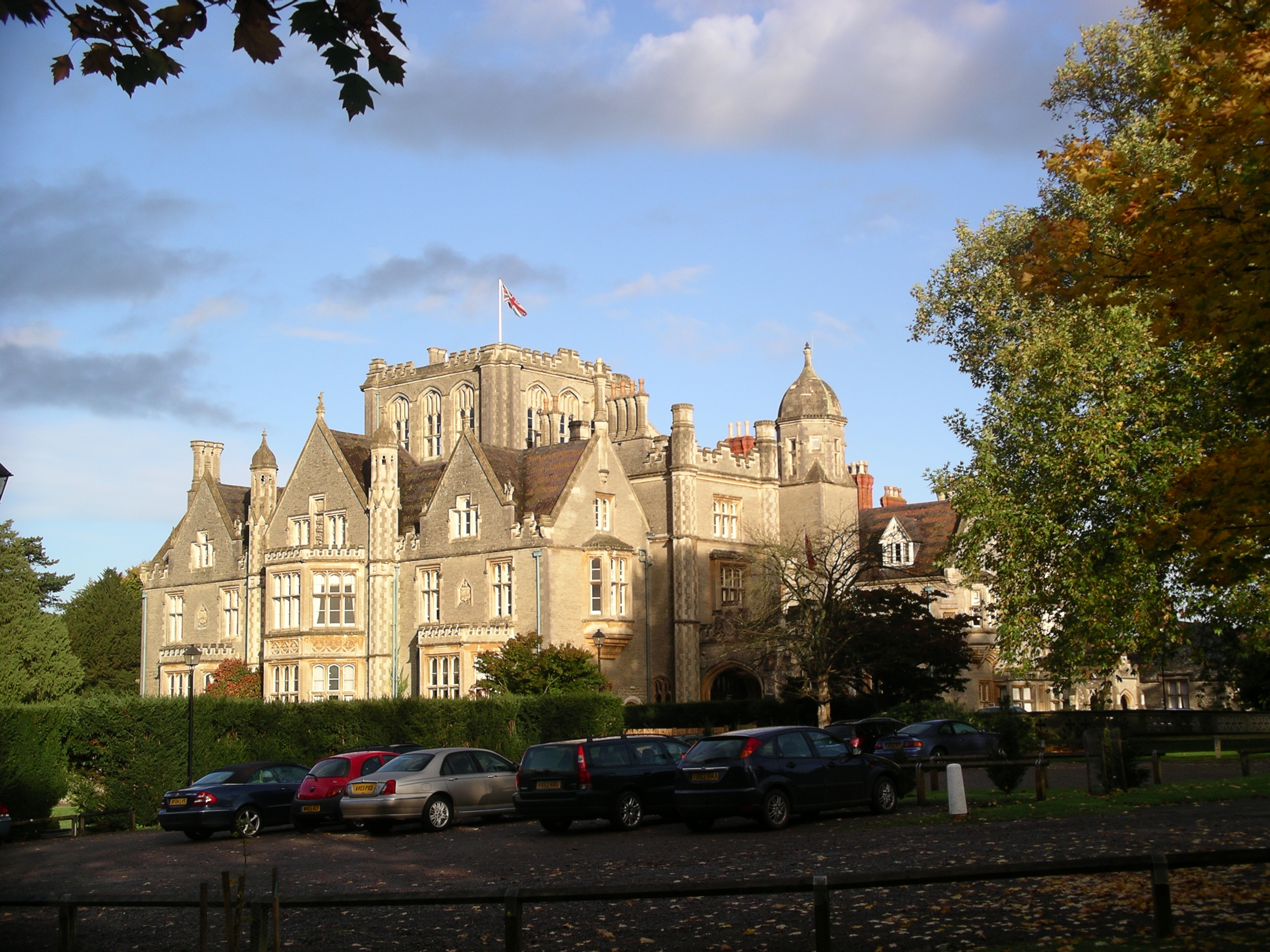
Tortworth Court, former seat of the Earls of Ducie

The ancestral seat of the Moreton family was Tortworth Court, Gloucestershire. Between 1848 and 1853, a new Tortworth Court was built for the second Earl of Ducie, in a Tudor style, to designs by the architect Samuel Sanders Teulon. Another family seat was Spring Park, Gloucestershire, which was demolished and replaced with the incomplete Woodchester Mansion.

The present family seat is the more modest Talbots End Farm, near Cromhall, Gloucestershire.

== Barons Ducie de Moreton, First creation (1720) ==
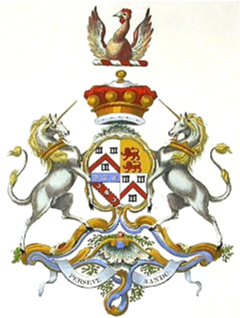
Coat of arms of the Barons Ducie.

- Matthew Ducie Moreton, 1st Baron Ducie (1663–1735)
- Matthew Ducie Moreton, 2nd Baron Ducie (1695–1770) (created Baron Ducie in 1763; barony of 1720 extinct on his death)

== Barons Ducie, Second creation (1763) ==
- Matthew Ducie Moreton, 1st Baron Ducie (1695–1770)
- Thomas Reynolds Moreton, 2nd Baron Ducie (1733–1785)
- Francis Reynolds-Moreton, 3rd Baron Ducie (1739–1808) (Captain in the Royal Navy)
- Thomas Reynolds Moreton, 4th Baron Ducie (1776–1840) (created Earl of Ducie in 1837)

== Earls of Ducie (1837) ==
- Thomas Reynolds-Moreton, 1st Earl of Ducie (1776–1840)
- Henry George Francis Reynolds-Moreton, 2nd Earl of Ducie (1802–1853)
- Henry John Reynolds-Moreton, 3rd Earl of Ducie (1827–1921)
  - Henry Haughton Reynolds-Moreton, Lord Moreton (1857–1920)
- Berkeley Basil Moreton, 4th Earl of Ducie (1834–1924)
- Capel Henry Berkeley Reynolds Moreton, 5th Earl of Ducie (1875–1952)
- Basil Howard Moreton, 6th Earl of Ducie (1917–1991)
- David Leslie Moreton, 7th Earl of Ducie (b. 1951)

The heir apparent is the present holder's son James Berkeley Moreton, Lord Moreton (b. 1981)

== Arms ==
Coat of arms of Earl of Ducie
Coronet A Coronet of an Earl Crest A Moorcock's Head Or combed and wattled Gules between two Wings displayed Azure Escutcheon Quarterly: 1st and 4th, Argent a Chevron Gules between three Square Buckles Sable (Moreton); 2nd and 3rd, Or two Lions passant guardant Gules (Ducie) Supporters On either side a Unicorn Argent armed unguled maned and tufted Or, each gorged with a Ducal Coronet per pale Gold and Gules Motto Perseverando (By persevering)
