= Christopher William Codrington =

English politician

Sir Christopher William Codrington

Member of Parliament for East Gloucestershire
- In office 1834–1834 Serving with Henry Reynolds-Moreton, Hon. Augustus Moreton, Hon. Francis Charteris, Sir Michael Hicks Beach, Bt, Robert Stayner Holford
- Preceded by: Sir Berkeley Guise, Bt; Henry Reynolds-Moreton
- Succeeded by: Michael Hicks Beach; Robert Stayner Holford

Personal details
- Born: 12 March 1805
- Died: 24 June 1864 (aged 59)
- Party: Conservative
- Spouse: Lady Georgiana Charlotte Anne Somerset (after 1836)
- Children: Sir Gerald Codrington, 1st Baronet; Capt. George Codrington; Alice, Lady Vavasour
- Parent(s): Christopher Bethell-Codrington; Hon. Harriet Foley

Sir Christopher William Codrington (12 March 1805 – 24 June 1864), of Dodington, Gloucestershire, was a Conservative British MP for East Gloucestershire between 7 August 1834 and 24 June 1864 and a landowner in Gloucestershire.

== Early life ==
Codrington was the eldest son of Christopher Bethell-Codrington (1764–1843) and the former Hon. Harriet Foley (d. 1843). His father had inherited Dodington Park in Gloucestershire from a relative who disinherited his son; (Note: The second Baronet sat as Member of Parliament for Beverley and Tewkesbury. He disinherited his son Sir William, the third Baronet, possibly for his marriage, and bequeathed his estates to his nephew Christopher Bethell-Codrington (the son of his brother Edward Codrington, fourth son of the first Baronet).) he was required to change his name to Bethell-Codrington (thus his son is also sometimes known as Christopher Bethell-Codrington).

His paternal grandfather was Edward Codrington. His maternal grandparents were Thomas Foley, 2nd Baron Foley of Kidderminster and the former Lady Henrietta Stanhope (herself daughter of the Earl of Harrington). Through his maternal grandmother, Codrington was thus connected to the earls of Sefton, the barons Penrhyn and landed gentry families.

== Career ==
Codrington was first elected to the House of Commons in a by-election on 7 August 1834, to replace Sir Berkeley Guise, 2nd Baronet, who had died on 23 July 1834, as one of the two members for the East Gloucestershire parliamentary constituency. He was re-elected on 10 January 1835, on 5 July 1841, on 27 February 1847 (with his young brother-in-law the Marquess of Worcester), in 1852 again with Worcester. When Worcester's father died in 1853, he became 8th Duke of Beaufort and was translated to the House of Lords. His seat was then filled briefly by Sir Michael Hicks-Beach, 8th Baronet between 9 January 1854 and 29 November 1854 when Hicks-Beach died. A second by-election on 19 December 1854 resulted in the election of Robert Stayner Holford, a wealthy landowner and dilettante, as the second member. Codrington and Holford represented East Gloucestershire for the next ten years, until Codrington's own death in 1864.

== Personal life ==
In 1836, Codrington married Lady Georgiana Charlotte Anne Somerset (1817–1884), second daughter of Henry Somerset, 7th Duke of Beaufort, and younger daughter by his first wife Georgiana Frederica Fitzroy (d. 1821), a niece of the Duke of Wellington. Georgiana's paternal ancestors included the Schuyler family, the Van Cortlandt family and the Delancey family of British North America. Together, they were the parents of:

- Sir Gerald William Henry Codrington, 1st Baronet (1850–1929), who married his first half-cousin maternally, Lady Edith Henrietta Sybil Denison, daughter of William Denison, 1st Earl of Londesborough and Lady Edith Somerset (youngest daughter of the 7th Duke of Beaufort), in 1887.
- Captain George John Granville Christopher Codrington (1855–1932), who fought in the Boer War in 1900, and was awarded the Coronation Medal in 1911.
- Alice Emily Georgiana Olivia Codrington (d. 1920), who married Sir Henry Mervyn Vavasour, 3rd Baronet, of Spalington, son and heir of Sir Henry Vavasour, 2nd Baronet, in 1891.

Sir Christopher died on 24 June 1864. His elder son Gerald was created a baronet in 1876.

== See also ==
- Codrington baronets

Parliament of the United Kingdom
Preceded by Sir Berkeley Guise, Bt; Henry Reynolds-Moreton	Member of Parliament for East Gloucestershire; 1834–1864; With: Henry Reynolds-Moreton to 1835; Hon. Augustus Moreton 1835–1841; Hon. Francis Charteris 1841–1847; Sir Michael Hicks Beach, Bt 1847–1854; Robert Stayner Holford 1854–1864	Succeeded by Michael Hicks Beach; Robert Stayner Holford
