= 1872 East Gloucestershire by-election =

UK Parliamentary by-election

The 1872 East Gloucestershire by-election was fought on 11 March 1872. The by-election was fought due to the Resignation of the incumbent MP of the Conservative Party, Robert Stayner Holford. It was won by the Conservative candidate John Reginald Yorke, who was unopposed.
