= 1874 East Gloucestershire by-election =

UK Parliamentary by-election

The 1874 East Gloucestershire by-election was held on 17 March 1874. The by-election was held due to the incumbent Conservative MP, Michael Hicks Beach, becoming Chief Secretary for Ireland. It was retained by the incumbent.
