= John Parker, 6th Earl of Morley =

British peer and soldier

John Parker, 6th Earl of Morley KCVO DL
- Born: 29 May 1923; Plympton, Devon, England
- Died: 20 September 2015 (aged 92)
- Spouse: Johanna St Aubyn (m. 1955)
- Children: 2
- Relatives: Albert Parker (grandfather); John St Aubyn (grandfather)
- Military career
- Wars: British Army
- Rank: Lieutenant-Colonel
- Units: King's Royal Rifle Corps; Royal Fusiliers
- Commands: 1st Battalion Royal Fusiliers
- Wars: World War II; Korea War

John St. Aubyn Parker, 6th Earl of Morley KCVO DL (29 May 1923 – 20 September 2015) was a British peer, a professional soldier, and county dignitary. Morley was a staunch monarchist and royal servant.

John Parker was born at Saltram House on 29 May 1923, the son of John Holford Parker (1886–1955) by his wife Marjory Katherine Elizabeth St. Aubyn (b.1893), a daughter of the 2nd Baron St Levan. His grandfather was Albert Parker, 3rd Earl of Morley (1843–1905), who was succeeded in turn by his sons Edmund, the 4th Earl of Morley (1877-1951) and Montagu, the 5th Earl (1878-1962), who both died without issue.

== Military ==
John's military forebears were intrepid courtiers, and one of the foremost families on the isthmus in the south-west, connected so closely with the sea. Parker was educated at Sunningdale School, Berkshire before attending Eton. In 1941 he enlisted in the King's Royal Rifle Corps, initially as a private soldier. He was soon recognised and promoted to a commission as a lieutenant in the infantry. His aristocratic lineage attracted him to the call of royal service. In 1944 he was drafted onto the royal protection squad at Buckingham Palace. Then in April 1944 he was invited to Sandringham House to celebrate Princess Elizabeth's 18th birthday party. His fellow officers invited the heir presumptive to the officer's mess, situated in the extensive Norfolk parklands.

Newly promoted Lieutenant Parker was sent to Germany with an anti-tank platoon. After the war he travelled across France and witnessed the scuttled French fleet at Toulon. With imperial decline still far from his mind, he was in Gaza as part of the British Mandate forces occupying Palestine during the Jewish insurgency in Mandatory Palestine. The infantry weapons training school employed Parker as an instructor, spending his free time duck shooting on the shores of Lake Huleh near Beersheba. In 1948, with India in abeyance, he was transferred with the Rifles into the Suez Canal Zone, where unrest threatened the security of the vital commercial ports. Already a Captain he was posted to Germany with the Royal Fusiliers, and thence to the Regimental depot in the Tower of London.

After war broke out in Korea he was sent in 1952 attached to an Australian battalion. Four days before the conclusion of the ceasefire, Parker departed for Suez again to command a company at Gebelt in the hills behind the Red Sea in the hinterland occupied by Arabs. He rode a camel 450 miles from HQ, calling it Rhubarb, reciting the famous popular ditty, "Lloyd George knew my father, my father knew Lloyd George". With order restored he returned to England in 1954.

On 28 April 1962, the 5th earl died, and he inherited the title and deeds of Earl of Morley from his uncle. He was sent to Malta garrison during the period the island remained a British colony and protectorate before gaining full independence as a member of the Commonwealth. He was promoted to Lieutenant-colonel and took command of 1st battalion Royal Fusiliers 1965-7. Going through staff college at Camberley he was appointed GOC 1 East Midlands District in 1967 for three years. He retired from the army in 1970 with the rank of lieutenant-colonel from the Royal Regiment of Fusiliers.

== Farming ==
Having retired from military life Lord Morley became actively involved in farming interests. He had long been concerned about the national heritage, ever since the family's holdings had been alienated; from 1969 the Earl of Morley was on the regional committee of the National Trust. With extensive landed agricultural properties in the south-west, the company he chaired was Farm Industries Ltd, Truro, where he remained in charge for fifteen years. For good measure he was governor of the Seale-Hayne College in 1973.

== Business ==
A year later, already on the board, bankers in Exeter appointed him Chairman of Lloyds Bank south-west. Business in Devon was brisk for the Morley interest, and the earl was a member of the Chamber of Commerce from 1970 until his death. As President of Plymouth incorporated Chamber he was a central personality in the public life of the city. The following year he was invited to become President of West Country Tourist Board for eighteen years. And Cornwall paid Morley the same compliment by asking him to be President of the Federation of their Chambers during 1970s.

The law was also of concern: during the same period Morley was raised to the assizes as a JP for Plymouth before the reorganisation. In 1974-5 he founded Plymouth Sound Ltd, and was appointed to the board of governors of Plymouth Polytechnic (now University of Plymouth). Playing such a role in the development of the two cities' tertiary sector, the polytechnic installed an Honorary Fellowship for him, whilst he picked up an Hon LLD from Exeter University.

== Royal duties ==
Not surprisingly Morley's main ceremonial royal duties were to deputise. He was appointed Deputy Lieutenant of Devon in 1973 in recognition of his services to the land, although he had already lost the ancestral seat to the National Trust in 1957.

He was made Lord Lieutenant of Devon, from vice-lieutenant, in 1982. a post usually reserved for military officers, and which was in the gift of the monarch. As the Queen's representative in Devon, he attended many official occasions, visits and events, liaising with the palace, and hosting, among others, President Mitterrand of France. The President and his wife arrived at the Royal Naval College, Dartmouth, to see the base where he had been billeted during 1939–45. The Queen and the Duke of Edinburgh knew and liked Morley, who provided a comprehensive security coverage when royal visitation occurred near sensitive naval installations. He also dealt promptly and efficiently with press calls. On one occasion Diana, Princess of Wales was notoriously late, driving too fast, broke down, and was escorted at Morley's command by police. He frequently played host to members of the royal family, accommodating and entertaining. In 1995 Prince Philip brought his entire entourage to Pound House on Dartmoor. Morley was a keen sportsman, and shot with a 12 bore regularly in the winter season. He had a smart shoot on his land and remained a committed countryman. His family lived at Pound House, Yelverton, on the edge of Dartmoor in the heart of the old mining stannaries on the stag moors.

In 1987 he was promoted to honorary Colonel of 4th battalion Devonshire and Dorset Regiment, which had recently merged, an honour he held for life. On 9 May 1987 he was appointed Honorary Colonel of the 4th Batt. The Devonshire and Dorset Regiment, 1st Rifle Volunteers, retiring in 1992 with the honorary rank of colonel.

== Family ==
On 15 October 1955 he married Johanna Katherine, daughter of Sir John Molesworth St Aubyn, 14th Baronet of Fairfield House, Somerset.

They had two children: Mark Lionel Parker, 7th Earl of Morley (born 22 August 1956) and Lady Venetia Parker (born 5 February 1960). His son, Mark Lionel Parker succeeded him as 7th Earl of Morley. The 7th earl was educated at Eton and joined the Royal Green Jackets. In 1999 he was a Captain. On 12 November 1983 he married Carolyn Jill, daughter of Donald McVicar of Meols, The Wirral. They had issue: Alexandra Louise (born 1985), Olivia Clare (born 1987), and Helena Georgia (born 1991).

Lady Venetia Catherine Parker married on 20 September 1997, Francis Jonathan Longstreth Thompson, son of Professor Francis Michael Longstreth Thompson of Wheathampstead, Herts.

The Earl died on 20 September 2015 at the age of 92. Following his funeral, a service of thanksgiving was held at Buckland Monachorum, Devon on 28 October 2015.

== Ancestry ==
Ancestors of John Parker, 6th Earl of Morley

16. John Parker, 1st Earl of Morley
8. Edmund Parker, 2nd Earl of Morley
17. Frances Talbot
4. Albert Parker, 3rd Earl of Morley
18. Montagu Parker
9. Harriet Parker
19. Harriet Newcombe
2. John Parker
20. George Holford
10. Robert Holford
21.
5. Margaret Holford
22. James Lindsay
11. Mary Lindsay
23. Anne Trotter
1. John Parker, 6th Earl of Morley
24. Sir Edward St Aubyn, 1st Baronet
12. John St Aubyn, 1st Baron St Levan
25. Emma Knollys
6. John St Aubyn, 2nd Baron St Levan
26. John Townshend, 4th Marquess Townshend
13. Lady Elizabeth Townshend
27. Elizabeth Crichton-Stuart
3. Marjory St Aubyn
28. Ernest Edgcumbe, 3rd Earl of Mount Edgcumbe
14. William Edgcumbe, 4th Earl of Mount Edgcumbe
29. Caroline Feilding
7. Lady Edith Edgcumbe
30. James Hamilton, 1st Duke of Abercorn
15. Lady Katherine Hamilton
31. Lady Louisa Russell

Honorary titles
Preceded by Sir Richard Hull	Lord Lieutenant of Devon; 1982–1998	Succeeded by Eric Dancer
Peerage of the United Kingdom
Preceded by Montagu Brownlow Parker	Earl of Morley; 1962–2015	Succeeded by Mark Parker
