= Sykes baronets of Sledmere (1783) =

Escutcheon of the Sykes baronets of Sledmere

The Sykes baronetcy, of Sledmere in the County of York, was created in the Baronetage of Great Britain on 28 March 1783 for the Rev. Mark Sykes, who died later that year. He was the son of Richard Sykes, a prosperous merchant, of Kingston upon Hull, and heir of his elder brother Richard.

The 2nd Baronet was Member of Parliament for Beverley from 1784 to 1790; and the 3rd Baronet represented York from 1807 to 1820. The 4th Baronet bred racehorses and was a tyrannical head of family. The 5th Baronet served as High Sheriff of Yorkshire in 1869.

The 6th Baronet was a travel writer, army officer and diplomat, Member of Parliament for Kingston upon Hull Central from 1911 to 1919. The 7th Baronet was High Sheriff of Yorkshire in 1948. He adopted the surname of Tatton-Sykes by deed poll in 1977.

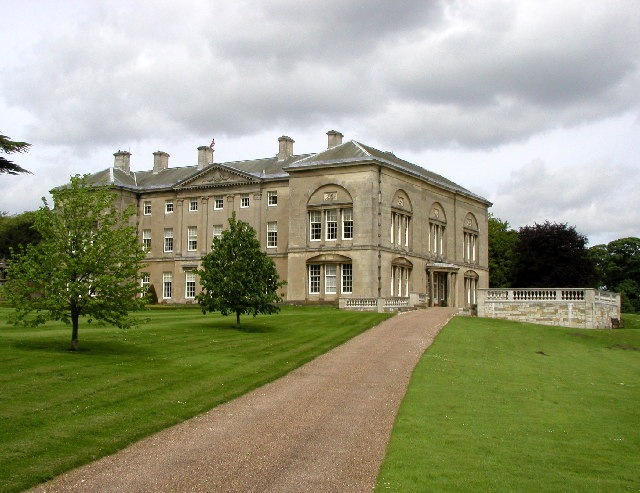
Sledmere House, seat of the Sykes baronets

The family seat is Sledmere House, Yorkshire.

== Sykes baronets, of Sledmere (1783) ==
- Sir Mark Sykes, 1st Baronet (1711–1783)
- Sir Christopher Sykes, 2nd Baronet (1749–1801)
- Sir Mark Masterman-Sykes, 3rd Baronet (1771–1823)
- Sir Tatton Sykes, 4th Baronet (1772–1863)
- Sir Tatton Sykes, 5th Baronet (1826–1913)
- Sir Tatton Benvenuto Mark Sykes, 6th Baronet (1879–1919)
- Sir Mark Tatton Richard Tatton-Sykes, 7th Baronet (1905–1978)
- Sir Tatton Christopher Mark Sykes, 8th Baronet (born 1943)

The heir presumptive is the present holder's brother, Jeremy John Sykes (born 1946).

== Extended family ==
- Christopher Sykes, second son of the 4th Baronet, was a Member of Parliament for constituencies in Yorkshire.
- Christopher Sykes, second son of the 6th Baronet, was a diplomat and author.

== Notes ==
Baronetage of Great Britain
Preceded by Dalling baronets	Sykes baronets of Sledmere; 28 March 1783	Succeeded by Guise baronets
