= Thomas Reynolds-Moreton, 1st Earl of Ducie =

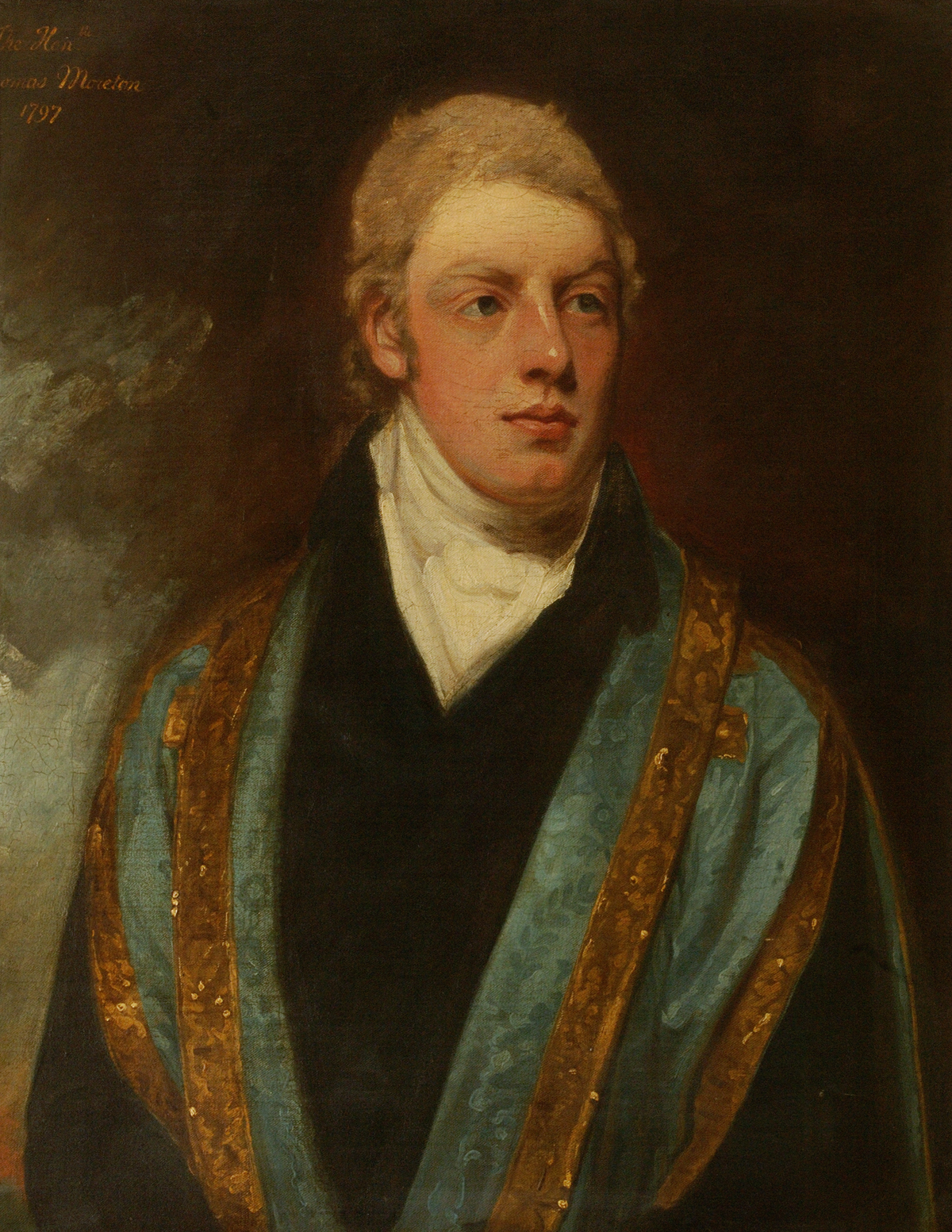
Thomas Reynolds-Moreton, 1st Earl of Ducie

Thomas Reynolds-Moreton, 1st Earl of Ducie (31 August 1776 – 22 June 1840) was the first Earl of Ducie.

He was the son of Francis Reynolds-Moreton, 3rd Baron Ducie, and his wife, the former Mary Provis. and was educated at Eton College and Exeter College, Oxford. He succeeded to the title of 4th Baron Ducie of Tortworth on 19 August 1808.

On 4 April 1809 he was commissioned as Lieutenant-Colonel Commandant of the Royal West Gloucestershire Local Militia at Bristol.

He was elected a Fellow of the Royal Society in 1814. He was created 1st Earl of Ducie on 28 January 1837.

He married Lady Frances Herbert, daughter of Henry Herbert, 1st Earl of Carnarvon, and Lady Elizabeth Alicia Maria Wyndham on 6 December 1797. They had three sons, and five daughters that survived to adulthood.:

- Lady Mary Elizabeth Kitty Moreton (d. 16 Dec 1842) married William Feilding, 7th Earl of Denbigh on 8 May 1822. They had five sons, and six daughters.
- Lady Emily Reynolds-Moreton married Adm. Sir James Whitley Deans Dundas, son of Dr. James Deans. They had no known children.
- Henry George Francis Reynolds-Moreton, 2nd Earl of Ducie (8 May 1802 - 2 June 1853)
- Hon. Augustus Henry Moreton Macdonald (24 June 1804 - 14 Feb 1862) married Mary Jane Macdonald Lockhart, daughter of Sir Charles Macdonald Lockhart, 2nd Baronet. They had two sons, and five daughters.
- Lady Julia Frances (abt. 1806-25 Jun 1869) married James Langston on 6 Jul 1824. They had two sons and two daughters.
- Lady Charlotte (27 Dec 1806-2 Jul 1881) married Maurice Berkeley, 1st Baron FitzHardinge on 30 Sep 1834. They had one son and one daughter.
- Hon. Percy (18 June 1808 - 15 Mar 1886) married Jane Frances Price, daughter of Sir Rose Price, 1st Baronet, on 28 April 1846. They had four sons, and three daughters.
- Lady Katherine (1815 - 1892) married John Raymond Raymond-Barker, on 14 December 1841. They had one known son.

== Arms ==
Coat of arms of Thomas Reynolds-Moreton, 1st Earl of Ducie
Coronet A Coronet of an Earl Crest A Moorcock's Head Or combed and wattled Gules between two Wings displayed Azure Escutcheon Quarterly: 1st and 4th, Argent a Chevron Gules between three Square Buckles Sable (Moreton); 2nd and 3rd, Or two Lions passant guardant Gules (Ducie) Supporters On either side a Unicorn Argent armed unguled maned and tufted Or, each gorged with a Ducal Coronet per pale Gold and Gules Motto Perseverando (By persevering)

Peerage of the United Kingdom
New creation	Earl of Ducie; 1837–1840	Succeeded by Henry Reynolds-Moreton
Peerage of Great Britain
Preceded by Francis Reynolds-Moreton	Baron Ducie; 1808–1840	Succeeded by Henry Reynolds-Moreton
