= Hamond-Graeme baronets =

- Escutcheon of the Hamond-Graeme Baronets of Holly Grove
- Creation date: 1783
- Status: extinct
- Extinction date: 1969

The Hamond, later Hamond-Graeme Baronetcy, of Holly Grove in the County of Berkshire, was a title in the Baronetage of Great Britain. It was created on 18 December 1783 for the Royal Navy officer Andrew Hamond.

His son, the 2nd Baronet, was Admiral of the Fleet in 1862. The 3rd Baronet assumed the additional surname of Graeme in 1873. The title became extinct in 1969 on the death of the 5th Baronet.

== Hamond, later Hamond-Graeme baronets, of Holly Grove (1783) ==
- Captain Sir Andrew Snape Hamond, 1st Baronet (1738–1828)
- Admiral of the Fleet Sir Graham Eden Hamond, 2nd Baronet (1779–1862)
- Vice-Admiral Sir Andrew Snape Hamond-Graeme, 3rd Baronet (1811–1874)
- Sir Graham Eden William Graeme Hamond-Graeme, 4th Baronet (1845–1920)
- Sir Egerton Hood Murray Hamond-Graeme, 5th Baronet (1877–1969), who left no heir.

Baronetage of Great Britain
Preceded by Guise baronets	Hamond baronets of Holly Grove; 18 December 1783	Succeeded by Barrow baronets
