= Sir Michael Hicks Beach, 8th Baronet =

British politician

Sir Michael Hicks Hicks-Beach, 8th Baronet DL (25 October 1809 – 22 November 1854) was a British Conservative Party MP and High Sheriff.

He was appointed High Sheriff of Gloucestershire for 1840 and then returned as Member of Parliament (MP) for East Gloucestershire from January 1854 until his death in November of the same year.

He was commissioned as Lieutenant-Colonel of the Royal North Gloucestershire Militia in 1844 and commanded it as Lt-Col Commandant from 1852 until his death.

Hicks-Beach married Harriett Vittoria Stratton, daughter of John Stratton, in 1832.

He died in November 1854, aged 45, and was succeeded in the baronetcy by his eldest son Michael, who became a prominent Conservative politician and was created Earl St Aldwyn in 1915. Hicks-Beach's younger son William Frederick Hicks-Beach was also an MP, as was his son-in-law Sir John Dillwyn-Llewelyn, 1st Baronet, husband of his daughter Caroline Julia Hicks-Beach.

Lady Hicks-Beach died at Penllergare, the residence of her Dillwyn-Llewelyn son-in-law, on 20 January 1900.

== Notes ==
Parliament of the United Kingdom
| Preceded by Sir Christopher William Codrington; Marquess of Worcester | Member of Parliament for East Gloucestershire; 1854; With: Sir Christopher William Codrington | Succeeded by Robert Stayner Holford; Sir Christopher William Codrington |
Honorary titles
| Preceded by Maynard Colchester | High Sheriff of Gloucestershire; 1840 | Succeeded by James Woodbridge Walters |
Baronetage of England
| Preceded by William Hicks | Baronet (of Beverston); 1834–1854 | Succeeded by Michael Hicks Beach |
