= Albert Parker, 3rd Earl of Morley =

British peer and politician

The Right Honourable The Earl of Morley PC DL JP
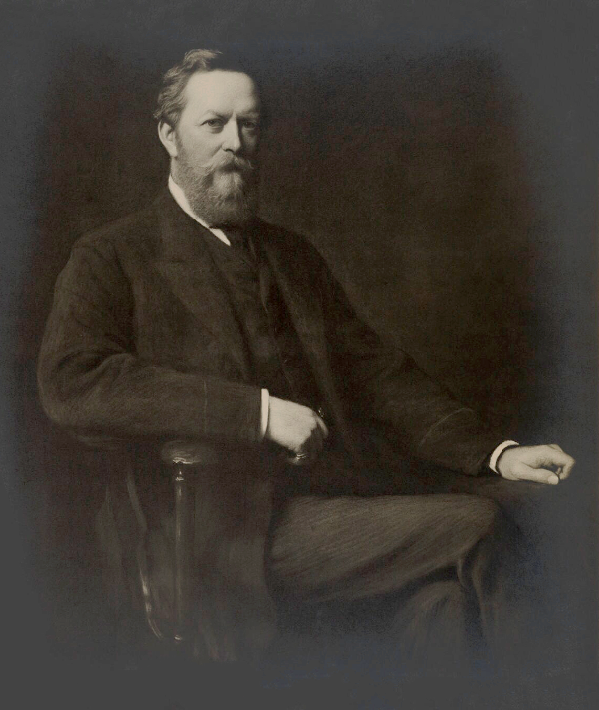

Under-Secretary of State for War
- In office 1 May 1880 – 9 June 1885
- Monarch: Queen Victoria
- Prime Minister: William Ewart Gladstone
- Preceded by: Viscount Bury
- Succeeded by: Viscount Bury

First Commissioner of Works
- In office 17 February 1886 – 16 April 1886
- Monarch: Queen Victoria
- Prime Minister: William Ewart Gladstone
- Preceded by: David Plunket
- Succeeded by: The Earl of Elgin

Personal details
- Born: 11 June 1843
- Died: 26 February 1905 (aged 61)
- Party: Liberal
- Spouse: Margaret Holford (d. 1908)
- Education: Balliol College, Oxford

Albert Edmund Parker, 3rd Earl of Morley PC, DL, JP (11 June 1843 – 26 February 1905), styled Viscount Boringdon until 1864, was a British peer and Liberal, later Liberal Unionist politician.

== Background and education ==
Morley was the son of Edmund Parker, 2nd Earl of Morley, and Harriet Sophia (née Parker). He was educated at Eton and Balliol College, Oxford.

== Political career ==
Morley succeeded his father as third Earl of Morley in 1864 and took his seat on the Liberal benches in the House of Lords. He served under William Ewart Gladstone as a Lord-in-waiting from 1868 to 1874 and as Under-Secretary of State for War from 1880 to 1885. In February 1886 he was admitted to the Privy Council and appointed First Commissioner of Works, a position he only held until April of the same year. He broke with Gladstone over Irish Home Rule and joined the Liberal Unionists. From 1889 to 1905 Morley was chairman of committees and a Deputy Speaker of the House of Lords.

Apart from his career in national politics Morley was Chairman of Devon County Council and a Justice of the Peace and Deputy Lieutenant for Devon. He also served as President of the first day of the 1886 Co-operative Congress.

== Marriage and children ==
In 1876 Lord Morley married Margaret Holford, eldest daughter of Robert Stayner Holford, of Weston Birt, Gloucestershire, and Dorchester House, Park Lane. They had three sons and a daughter:

- Edmund Robert Parker, 4th Earl of Morley (born 19 April 1877, died 10 October 1951)
- Captain Montagu Brownlow Parker, 5th Earl of Morley (born 13 October 1878, died 28 April 1962)
- Lady Mary Theresa Parker (born 13 December 1881, died 2 November 1932)
- John Holford Parker (born 22 June 1886, died 27 February 1955), father of John St Aubyn Parker, 6th Earl of Morley

Lord Morley died in February 1905, aged 61, and was succeeded in his peerages and estates by his eldest son, Edmund. Lady Morley died in 1908.

Political offices
| Preceded by The Viscount Strathallan; The Viscount Hawarden; The Lord Bagot; The Lord Crofton; The Lord Skelmersdale; The Lord Raglan; The Earl of Haddington | Lord-in-waiting with The Marquess of Normanby 1868–1869; The Earl of Camperdown 1868–1870; The Lord Camoys 1868–1874; The Lord Suffield 1868–1872; The Lord Methuen 1868–1874; The Lord Lurgan 1869–1874; The Lord Wrottesley 1869–1874; The Marquess of Huntly 1870–1873; The Earl of Kenmare 1872–1874; The Earl of Breadalbane and Holland 1873–1874; 1868–1874 | Succeeded by The Earl of Dunmore; The Earl of Roden; The Viscount Hawarden; The Lord Bagot; The Lord de Ros; The Lord Elphinstone; The Lord Walsingham |
| Preceded by Viscount Bury | Under-Secretary of State for War; 1880–1885 | Succeeded by Viscount Bury |
| Preceded by David Plunket | First Commissioner of Works; 1886 | Succeeded by The Earl of Elgin |
Peerage of the United Kingdom
| Preceded by Edmund Morley | Earl of Morley; 1864–1905 | Succeeded by Edmund Robert Parker |
