= David Moreton, 7th Earl of Ducie =

British peer

David Leslie Moreton, 7th Earl of Ducie (born 20 September 1951) is a British peer, landowner, and farmer. He was a member of the House of Lords from 1991 to 1999. He was previously known as Lord Moreton.

The son of Basil Moreton, 6th Earl of Ducie, and his wife Alison Bates, he was educated at Cheltenham College and Wye College, where he graduated B.Sc. in agriculture in 1973.

Becoming a career farmer on his father's estate in Gloucestershire, on 12 November 1991 he succeeded as the Earl of Ducie (created 1837), Baron Ducie (1763), and Baron Moreton of Tortworth (1837).

In 2003 Ducie was living at Talbots End Farm, Cromhall, Gloucestershire. Although the family seat, Tortworth Court, was sold after the Second World War, much of its estate, including a nearby lake and woodland, remains in the hands of Tortworth Estates Ltd, of which Ducie is a Director.

On 26 April 1975, as Lord Moreton he married Helen Duchesne, a daughter of M. L. Duchesne, and they have two children:

- James Berkeley Moreton, Lord Moreton (born 1981)
- Lady Claire Alison Moreton (born 1984)
