= Doocy =

Doocy is a surname. Notable people with the surname include:

- Fred J. Doocy (1913–2017), American politician and banker
- Peter Doocy (born 1987), American television journalist
- Steve Doocy (born 1956), American political commentator

== See also ==
- Doocey
- Ducey
- Ducie (disambiguation)
