= Francis Charteris, 10th Earl of Wemyss =

British politician

The Right Honourable The Earl of Wemyss and March GCVO DL
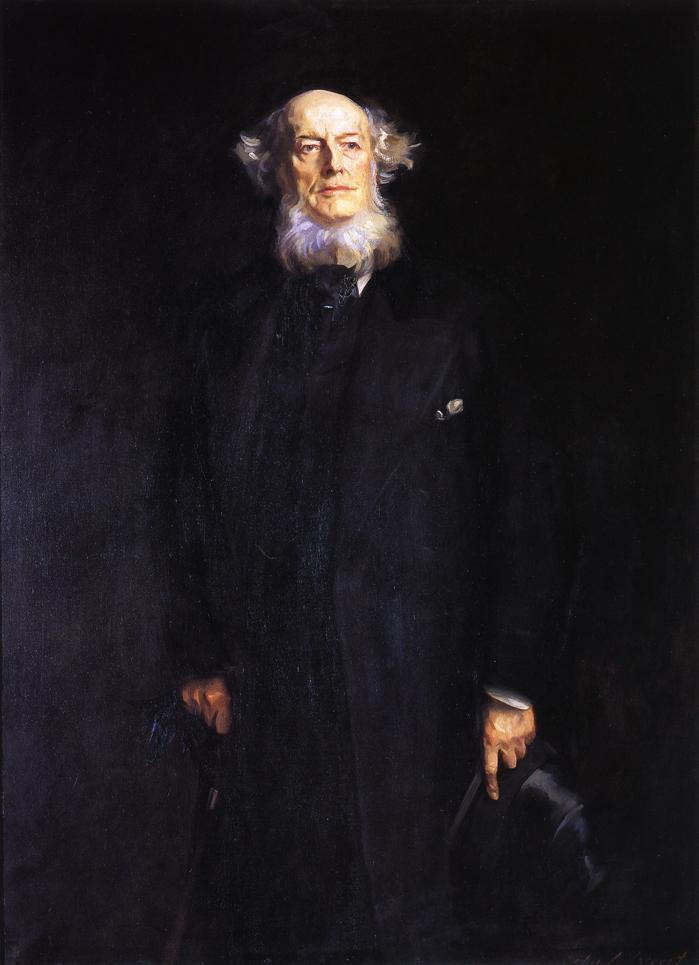
- The Earl of Wemyss and March, by John Singer Sargent, 1909.

Member of Parliament for Haddingtonshire
- In office 1847–1883
- Preceded by: Sir Thomas Buchan-Hepburn
- Succeeded by: Lord Elcho

Junior Lord of the Treasury
- In office 1853–1855
- Preceded by: Marquess of Chandos; The Lord Henry Lennox; Thomas Bateson
- Succeeded by: The Viscount Monck; Viscount Duncan

Member of Parliament for East Gloucestershire
- In office 1841–1846 Serving with Sir Christopher Codrington
- Preceded by: Augustus Moreton; Sir Christopher Codrington
- Succeeded by: Marquess of Worcester; Sir Christopher Codrington

Personal details
- Born: Francis Richard Charteris; 4 August 1818
- Died: 30 June 1914 (aged 95)
- Party: Whig
- Spouses: Lady Anne Frederica Anson (m. 1843; died 1896); Grace Blackburn (c. 1857–1946) (m. 1900)
- Parent: Francis Wemyss-Charteris, 9th Earl of Wemyss
- Education: Eton College
- Alma mater: Christ Church, Oxford

Francis Richard Charteris, 10th Earl of Wemyss and 6th Earl of March GCVO DL (pronounced weems, rhyming with seems) (4 August 1818 – 30 June 1914), styled as Lord Elcho between 1853 and 1883, was a British Whig politician. He founded the Liberty and Property Defence League.

== Early life ==
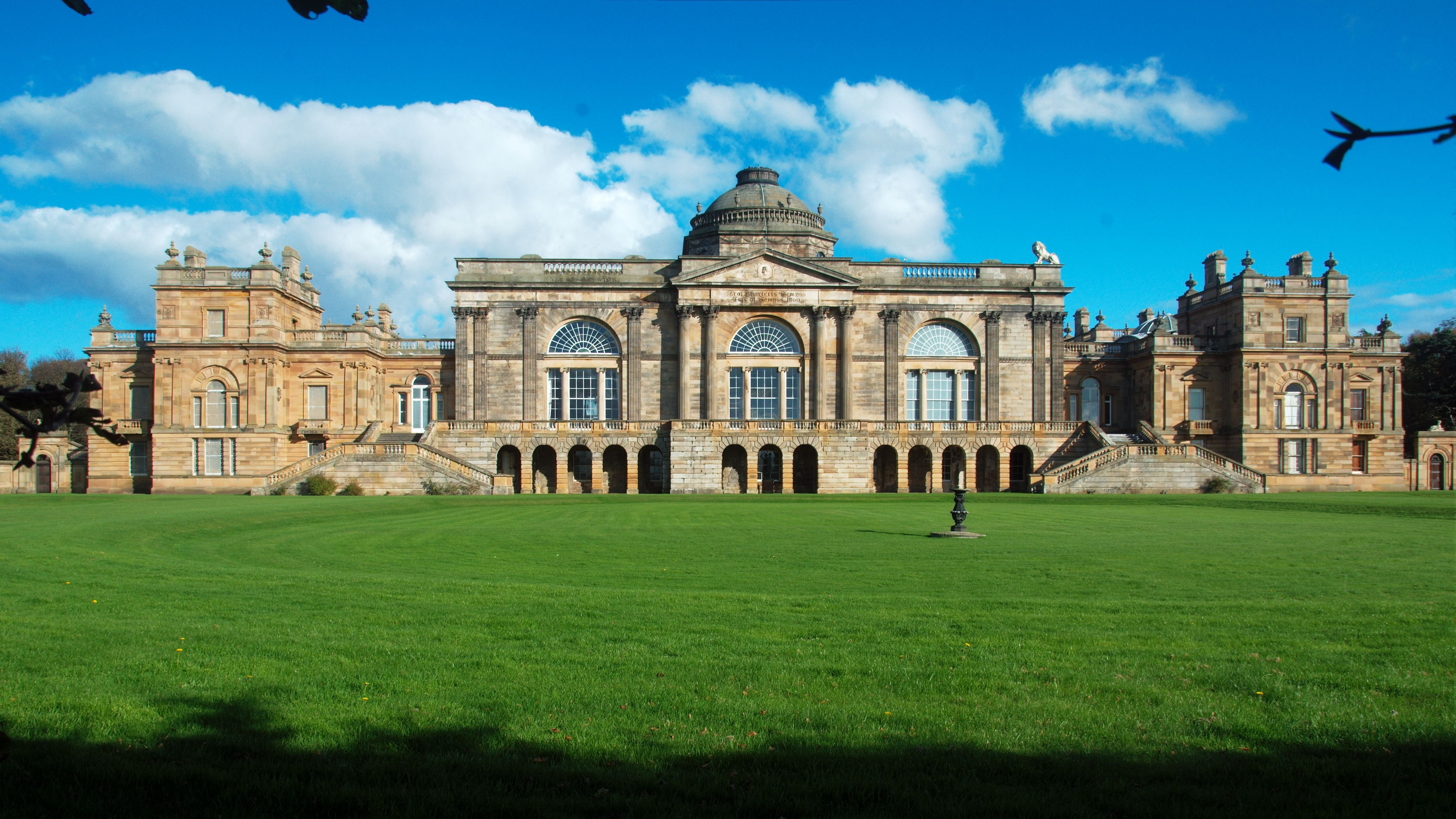
Gosford House, seats of the Earls of Wemyss

He was the eldest son and heir of Francis Wemyss-Charteris, 9th Earl of Wemyss and Lady Louisa Bingham. Among his siblings was younger brother Richard Charteris (who married Lady Margaret Butler, a daughter of Richard Butler, 2nd Earl of Glengall) and sister Lady Louisa Wemyss-Charteris (wife of William Wells, MP for Beverley and Peterborough).

His paternal grandparents were Francis Douglas, 8th Earl of Wemyss and the former Margaret Campbell (daughter of Scottish landowner Walter Campbell, 3rd of Shawfield and Islay and 9th of Skipness). His maternal grandparents were Richard Bingham, 2nd Earl of Lucan and Lady Elizabeth Belasyse, third daughter of Henry Belasyse, 2nd Earl Fauconberg and former wife of Bernard Howard, 12th Duke of Norfolk.

He was educated at Eton and graduated from Christ Church, Oxford with a B.A. degree.

== Career ==
As Lord Elcho he was commanding officer of the London Scottish Rifles Volunteers regiment for 17 years from its formation in 1859, gaining the rank of Lieutenant-Colonel. He is credited with the design of the Elcho sword bayonet, which saw limited use in the Ashanti campaign of 1895-6.

Charteris was a member of the Canterbury Association from 27 March 1848, and belonged to the management committee.

He developed an interest in the alternative medical practice of Homeopathy, even becoming President of the London Homeopathic Hospital until his death. The strength of his belief is evidenced by his writing in March 1914:

I wish all success to Homoeopathy, to which I attach my physical well-being in great measure. When I was 90 I was asked to what I attributed my well-being at that late period of life. My answer was, "To parentage and moderation". I should have added "AND HOMOEOPATHY," with which I have been treated since I was 20.

Between 1836 and 1866, he was trustee of the National Portrait Gallery. Upon his father's death in 1883, he succeeded to the Earldom of Wemyss and March. Prior to then he was known as Lord Elcho. From 1881 to 1901, he was aide-de-camp to Queen Victoria, followed by aide-de-camp to King Edward VII from 1901 to 1910. He also held the office of Deputy Lieutenant of Haddington and Selkirk.

Lord Elcho

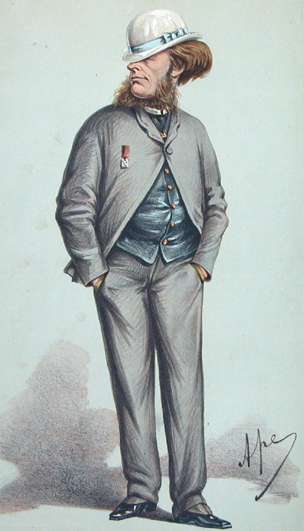
Lord Elcho by Carlo Pellegrini, 1870.

== Personal life ==
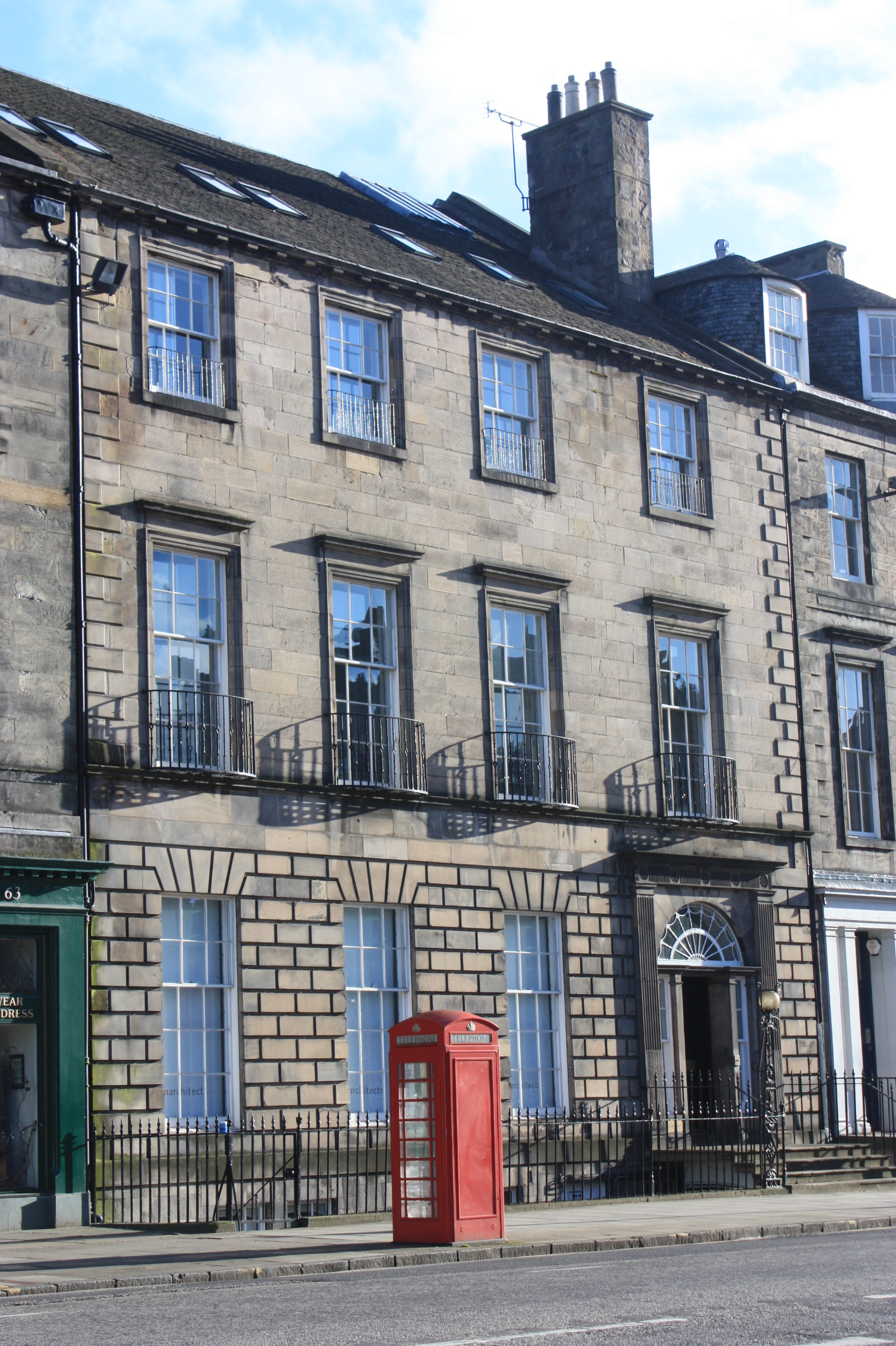
64 Queen Street, Edinburgh

On 29 August 1843, he married Lady Anne Frederica Anson, the second daughter of Thomas Anson, 1st Earl of Lichfield and the former Louisa Barbara Catherine Phillips (youngest daughter of Nathaniel Phillips of Slebech Hall). In Edinburgh, they lived at 64 Queen Street, the only four-bay townhouse on this prestigious street in Edinburgh's First New Town. Together, they were the parents of six sons and three daughters, including:

- Francis Charteris (1844–1870), who died unmarried.
- Arthur Charteris (1846–1847), who died in infancy.
- Alfred Walter Charteris, (1847–1873), a Lieutenant in the 71st Foot who fought in the Ashanti War and died at sea.
- Lady Evelyn Charteris (1849–1939), who married John Vesey, 4th Viscount de Vesci, in 1872.
- Lady Lilian Harriet Charteris (1851–1914), who married Sir Henry Pelly, 3rd Baronet in 1872. After his death, she married Sir Henry Francis Redhead Yorke in 1882.
- Lady Hilda Charteris (1854–1901), who married, as his first wife William Brodrick, 1st Earl of Midleton, in 1880.
- Hugo Richard Charteris, 11th Earl of Wemyss (1857–1937), who married Mary Constance Wyndham, eldest daughter of Hon. Percy Scawen Wyndham.
- Alan Dudley Charteris (1860–1901), a Lieutenant in the Coldstream Guards who died unmarried.
- Sir Evan Edward Charteris (1864–1940), a trustee of the National Portrait Gallery, National Gallery, Tate Gallery and the Wallace Collection, who in 1930 married Lady Dorothy (née Browne) Grosvenor, widow of Lord Edward Arthur Grosvenor (youngest son of the Duke of Westminster) and eldest daughter of Valentine Browne, 5th Earl of Kenmare and the former Elizabeth Baring (eldest daughter of Edward Baring, 1st Baron Revelstoke).

After the death of his first wife on 22 Jul 1896, he remarried, to Grace Blackburn (c. 1857–1946) in December 1900. Grace was the third daughter of Major John Blackburn and the former Maria Warburton (a daughter of The Very Reverend Charles Warburton, Archdeacon of Tuam).

Lord Wemyss died on 30 June 1914. The Dowager Countess of Wemyss died on 13 February 1946.

=== Descendants ===
Through his daughter Lady Evelyn, he was a grandfather of Mary Gertrude Vesey, the second wife of Aubrey Herbert (second son of Henry Herbert, 4th Earl of Carnarvon), whose daughter Laura Herbert married the writer Evelyn Waugh, and was the mother of Auberon Waugh.

=== Honours and legacy ===
Charteris Bay in Lyttelton Harbour was chosen as a locality name to commemorate his role in the settlement of Canterbury in New Zealand.

Elcho Island in the Northern Territory of Australia is named after him.

Parliament of the United Kingdom
Preceded by Augustus Moreton; Sir Christopher Codrington	Member of Parliament for East Gloucestershire; 1841–1846; With: Sir Christopher Codrington	Succeeded by Marquess of Worcester; Sir Christopher Codrington
Preceded by Sir Thomas Buchan-Hepburn	Member of Parliament for Haddingtonshire; 1847–1883	Succeeded by Lord Elcho
Political offices
Preceded by Marquess of Chandos; The Lord Henry Lennox; Thomas Bateson	Junior Lord of the Treasury; 1853–1855	Succeeded by The Viscount Monck; Viscount Duncan
Peerage of Scotland
Preceded by Francis Wemyss-Charteris	Earl of Wemyss; 1883–1914	Succeeded by Hugo Charteris
Preceded by Francis Wemyss-Charteris	Earl of March; 1883–1914	Succeeded by Hugo Charteris
Peerage of the United Kingdom
Preceded by Francis Wemyss-Charteris	Baron Wemyss; 1883–1914; Member of the House of Lords (1883–1914)	Succeeded by Hugo Charteris
