= Whitfield, Gloucestershire =

Hamlet in South Gloucestershire, England

Coordinates: 51.622°N 2.471°W

Whitfield is a hamlet in South Gloucestershire, England.

== Location ==
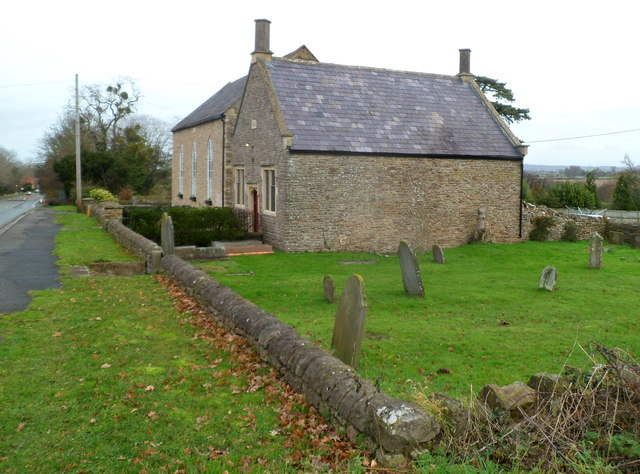
Gravestones, Whitfield

It is on the A38 near Falfield. Located just beyond the B4061 junction, the rural exit from Thornbury. The hamlet has a nucleus around Brinkmarsh and Iron Hogg Lanes but also strings out along the main A38 between Bristol and Gloucester and into the B4061 towards Thornbury.

== Economy and facilities ==
The hamlet is bounded by farmland. The northern outskirts have an organic beef farm and Eastwood Park garden centre. The local buildings are, in keeping with the regional vernacular, made mainly of stone or rendered detached homes and some farm buildings. The most notable nearby landmarks are the country estates of Eastwood Park and Tortworth Court. Eastwood Park is now a conference centre, with training and social facilities that cater to the healthcare and private sectors. Tortworth Court is now a quality hotel with a number of restaurants, pool and spa facilities.
