= Dalling baronets =

Escutcheon of the Dalling baronets of Burwood

The Dalling baronetcy, of Burwood in the County of Surrey, was a title in the Baronetage of Great Britain. It was created on 11 March 1783 for the soldier and colonial administrator John Dalling. The title became extinct on the death of his only surviving son, the 2nd Baronet, in 1864.

== Dalling baronets, of Burwood (1783) ==
- Sir John Dalling, 1st Baronet (c. 1731–1798)
- Sir William Windham Dalling, 2nd Baronet (1774–1864)

Baronetage of Great Britain
Preceded by Graham baronets	Dalling baronets of Burwood; 11 March 1783	Succeeded by Sykes baronets
