= Henry Reynolds-Moreton, 2nd Earl of Ducie =

British Whig politician, agriculturalist and cattle breeder

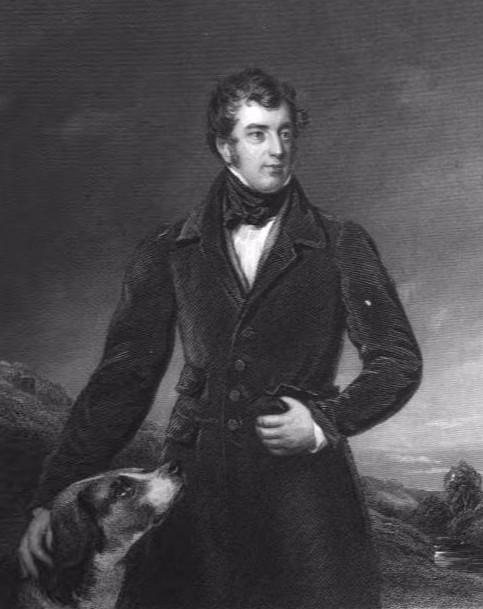
Henry Reynolds-Moreton, 2nd Earl of Ducie, 1852 engraving

Henry George Francis Reynolds-Moreton, 2nd Earl of Ducie (8 May 1802 – 2 June 1853), styled the Hon. Henry Reynolds-Moreton from 1808 to 1837 and the Lord Moreton from 1837 to 1840, was a British Whig politician, agriculturalist and cattle breeder.

== Early life ==
Ducie was born on 8 May 1802, the son of Thomas Reynolds-Moreton, 1st Earl of Ducie, and his wife Lady Frances Herbert, daughter of Henry Herbert, 1st Earl of Carnarvon. He was educated at Eton. Lord Ducie married the Hon. Elizabeth, daughter of John Dutton, 2nd Baron Sherborne, on 29 June 1826. They had eleven sons and four daughters.

== Career ==
Lord Moreton entered Parliament for Gloucestershire in 1831, a seat he held until the following year when the constituency was abolished, and then represented Gloucestershire East until 1835. After entering the House of Lords on the death of his father in 1840 he served in the Whig administration of Lord Russell as a Lord-in-waiting (government whip in the House of Lords) from 1846 to 1847, when he resigned. In Parliament he gained a reputation as an advocate of free trade. He supported the repeal of the Corn Laws and, as an agriculturalist, his views were influential.

Between 1848 and 1853, a new Tortworth Court was built for Ducie, in a Tudor style, to designs by the architect Samuel Sanders Teulon.

Despite his political career, Ducie is best remembered as a leading agriculturalist and as a breeder of shorthorns. From 1851 to 1852 he was President of the Royal Agricultural Society. The sale of his famous shorthorns shortly after his death in 1853 generated £9,000.

He was a prominent member of the Evangelical Alliance.

== Later life ==
He died on 2 June 1853 at his home, Tortworth Court, Whitfield, Gloucestershire aged 51, and was succeeded in the earldom by his eldest son Henry. His wife, the Countess of Ducie, died in 1865. As his son Henry died in October 1921 without a living son, the earldom passed to another of Lord Ducie's sons Berkeley who had immigrated to Queensland, Australia.

== Legacy ==
The "Ducie cultivator" usually ascribed to him is in fact believed to have been invented by the managers of his ironworks at Uley.

== Arms ==
Coat of arms of Henry Reynolds-Moreton, 2nd Earl of Ducie
Coronet A Coronet of an Earl Crest A Moorcock's Head Or combed and wattled Gules between two Wings displayed Azure Escutcheon Quarterly: 1 and 4th, Argent a Chevron Gules between three Square Buckles Sable (Moreton); 2 and 3rd, Or two Lions passant guardant Gules (Ducie) Supporters On either side a Unicorn Argent armed unguled maned and tufted Or, each gorged with a Ducal Coronet per pale Gold and Gules Motto Perseverando (By persevering)

== Notes ==
Parliament of the United Kingdom
Preceded by Lord Edward Somerset; Sir Berkeley Guise	Member of Parliament for Gloucestershire; 1831–1832; With: Sir Berkeley Guise	Constituency abolished
New constituency	Member of Parliament for East Gloucestershire; 1832–1835; With: Sir Berkeley Guise 1832–1834; Sir Christopher William Codrington 1834–1835	Succeeded by Sir Christopher William Codrington and Augustus Moreton
Peerage of the United Kingdom
Preceded by Thomas Reynolds-Moreton	Earl of Ducie; 1840–1853	Succeeded by Henry Reynolds-Moreton
