= Ducey (surname) =

Ducey is a surname.

== List of people surnamed Ducey ==
- Angela Ducey (born 1965), American businesswoman and philanthropist
- Caroline Ducey (born 1976), French actress
- Charles J. Ducey (1906–1985), American Knight of Columbus
- Doug Ducey (born 1964), American businessman and politician
- John Ducey (born 1969), American actor
- John Ducey (baseball) (1908–1983), Canadian baseball executive and umpire
- John Ducey (priest) (fl. 17th-century), Irish Anglican priest
- Lillian Ducey (1878–1952), American screenwriter and director
- Rob Ducey (born 1965), Canadian professional baseball player and coach
