= East Gloucestershire =

Former parliamentary constituency in the United Kingdom

- Former county constituency for the House of Commons
- Context: 1832-1868. Extract from 1837 result: the central, striped area.
- County: Gloucestershire

1832–1885
- Seats: Two
- Created from: Gloucestershire
- Replaced by: Tewkesbury; Cirencester; Stroud; Thornbury

East Gloucestershire, formally the Eastern division of Gloucestershire and often referred to as Gloucestershire Eastern, was a parliamentary constituency in Gloucestershire, represented in the House of Commons of the Parliament of the United Kingdom. It elected two Members of Parliament (MPs) using the bloc vote system.

The constituency was created when the Great Reform Act split Gloucestershire into eastern and western divisions, with effect from the 1832 general election.

Under the Redistribution of Seats Act 1885, East Gloucestershire was abolished from the 1885 election, when the former eastern and western divisions were replaced by five new single-seat county constituencies: Cirencester, Forest of Dean, Stroud, Tewkesbury, and Thornbury.

== Boundaries ==
1832–1885: The Hundreds of Crowthorne and Minety, Brightwell's Barrow, Bradley, Rapsgate, Bisley, Longtree, Whitstone, Kiftsgate, Westminster, Deerhurst, Slaughter, Cheltenham, Cleeve, Tibaldston, Tewkesbury, and Dudstone and King's Barton, and also the City and County of Gloucester and the Borough of Cirencester.

The constituency was the eastern division of the historic county of Gloucestershire, in South West England.

The place of election was at Gloucester. This was where the hustings were situated and electors voted by spoken declaration in public, before the secret ballot was introduced in 1872.

The qualification to vote in county elections, in the period when this constituency operated, was to be a 40 shilling freeholder.

The parliamentary borough constituencies of Cheltenham, Cirencester, Gloucester, Stroud, and Tewkesbury were all located in East Gloucestershire. Qualified freeholders from those boroughs could vote in the county division. Bristol was a "county of itself", so its freeholders qualified to vote in the borough, not in any county division.

== Members of Parliament ==
Election	1st member	1st party	2nd member	2nd party
1832, 21 December	Sir Berkeley Guise, Bt	Whig	Hon. Henry Reynolds-Moreton	Whig
1834, 7 August	Sir Christopher William Codrington	Tory	Hon. Henry Reynolds-Moreton	Whig
1835, 10 January	Sir Christopher William Codrington	Conservative	Hon. Augustus Moreton	Whig
1841, 5 July	Sir Christopher William Codrington	Conservative	Hon. Francis Charteris	Conservative
1846, 27 February	Sir Christopher William Codrington	Conservative	Henry Somerset	Conservative
1854, 9 January	Sir Christopher William Codrington	Conservative	Sir Michael Hicks Beach, Bt	Conservative
1854, 19 December	Sir Christopher William Codrington	Conservative	Robert Stayner Holford	Conservative
1864, 12 July	Sir Michael Hicks Beach, Bt	Conservative	Robert Stayner Holford	Conservative
1872, 11 March	Sir Michael Hicks Beach, Bt	Conservative	John Yorke	Conservative
1885	constituency abolished			

== Election results ==
=== Elections in the 1880s ===
By-election, 1 Jul 1885: East Gloucestershire
Party	Candidate	Votes	%	±%
Conservative	Michael Hicks Beach	Unopposed		
Conservative hold				

- Caused by Hicks Beach's appointment as Chancellor of the Exchequer.

General election 1880: East Gloucestershire (2 seats)
Party	Candidate	Votes	%	±%
Conservative	Michael Hicks Beach	Unopposed		
Conservative	John Yorke	Unopposed		
Registered electors		8,579		
Conservative hold				
Conservative hold				

=== Elections in the 1870s ===
By-election, 17 Mar 1874: East Gloucestershire
Party	Candidate	Votes	%	±%
Conservative	Michael Hicks-Beach	Unopposed		
Conservative hold				

- Caused by Hicks-Beach's appointment as Chief Secretary to the Lord Lieutenant of Ireland.

General election 1874: East Gloucestershire (2 seats)
Party	Candidate	Votes	%	±%
Conservative	Michael Hicks-Beach	Unopposed		
Conservative	John Yorke	Unopposed		
Registered electors		9,157		
Conservative hold				
Conservative hold				

By-election, 11 Mar 1872: East Gloucestershire
Party	Candidate	Votes	%	±%
Conservative	John Yorke	Unopposed		
Conservative hold				

- Caused by Holford's resignation.

=== Elections in the 1860s ===
General election 1868: East Gloucestershire (2 seats)
Party	Candidate	Votes	%	±%
Conservative	Michael Hicks-Beach	Unopposed		
Conservative	Robert Stayner Holford	Unopposed		
Registered electors		8,858		
Conservative hold				
Conservative hold				

General election 1865: East Gloucestershire (2 seats)
Party	Candidate	Votes	%	±%
Conservative	Michael Hicks-Beach	Unopposed		
Conservative	Robert Stayner Holford	Unopposed		
Registered electors		7,515		
Conservative hold				
Conservative hold				

By-election, 12 July 1864: East Gloucestershire
Party	Candidate	Votes	%	±%
Conservative	Michael Hicks-Beach	Unopposed		
Conservative hold				

- Caused by Codrington's death.

=== Elections in the 1850s ===
General election 1859: East Gloucestershire (2 seats)
Party	Candidate	Votes	%	±%
Conservative	Christopher William Codrington	Unopposed		
Conservative	Robert Stayner Holford	Unopposed		
Registered electors		7,816		
Conservative hold				
Conservative hold				

General election 1857: East Gloucestershire (2 seats)
Party	Candidate	Votes	%	±%
Conservative	Christopher William Codrington	Unopposed		
Conservative	Robert Stayner Holford	Unopposed		
Registered electors		7,891		
Conservative hold				
Conservative hold				

By-election, 19 December 1854: East Gloucestershire
Party	Candidate	Votes	%	±%
Conservative	Robert Stayner Holford	Unopposed		
Conservative hold				

- Caused by Hicks-Beach's death.

By-election, 9 January 1854: East Gloucestershire
Party	Candidate	Votes	%	±%
Conservative	Michael Hicks-Beach	3,363	58.9	N/A
Whig	Edward Holland	2,344	41.1	New
Majority		1,019	17.8	N/A
Turnout		5,707	72.2	N/A
Registered electors		7,906		
Conservative hold				

- Caused by Henry Somerset's succession to the Peerage as 8th Duke of Beaufort

General election 1852: East Gloucestershire (2 seats)
Party	Candidate	Votes	%	±%
Conservative	Christopher William Codrington	Unopposed		
Conservative	Henry Somerset	Unopposed		
Registered electors		7,986		
Conservative hold				
Conservative hold				

=== Elections in the 1840s ===
General election 1847: East Gloucestershire (2 seats)
Party	Candidate	Votes	%	±%
Conservative	Christopher William Codrington	Unopposed		
Conservative	Henry Somerset	Unopposed		
Registered electors		7,803		−2.1
Conservative hold				
Conservative hold				

East Gloucestershire by-election, 27 February 1846
Party	Candidate	Votes	%	±%
Conservative	Henry Somerset	Unopposed		
Conservative hold				

- Resignation of Charteris

General election 1841: East Gloucestershire (2 seats)
Party	Candidate	Votes	%	±%
Conservative	Francis Charteris	Unopposed		
Conservative	Christopher William Codrington	Unopposed		
Registered electors		7,971		+4.9
Conservative hold				
Conservative gain from Whig				

=== Elections in the 1830s ===
General election 1837: East Gloucestershire (2 seats)
Party	Candidate	Votes	%	±%
Conservative	Christopher William Codrington	Unopposed		
Whig	Augustus Morton	Unopposed		
Registered electors		7,598		+16.5
Conservative hold				
Whig hold				

General election 1835: East Gloucestershire (2 seats)
Party	Candidate	Votes	%	±%
Conservative	Christopher William Codrington	Unopposed		
Whig	Augustus Morton	Unopposed		
Registered electors		6,521		−0.7
Conservative gain from Whig				
Whig hold				

By-election, 14 August 1834: East Gloucestershire
Party	Candidate	Votes	%	±%
Tory	Christopher William Codrington	2,779	50.6	+21.5
Whig	Thomas Leigh	2,709	49.4	−21.4
Majority		70	1.2	N/A
Turnout		5,488	83.5	−5.9
Registered electors		6,569		+2.1
Tory gain from Whig				

- Death of Guise

General election 1832: East Gloucestershire (2 seats)
Party	Candidate	Votes	%	±%
Whig	Berkeley Guise	3,311	36.1	
Whig	Henry Reynolds-Moreton	3,184	34.7	
Tory	Christopher William Codrington	2,672	29.1	
Majority		512	5.6	
Turnout		5,753	89.4	
Registered electors		6,437		
Whig win (new seat)				
Whig win (new seat)				
