= John Wright Guise =

English army officer

General Sir John Wright Guise, 3rd Baronet (20 July 1777 – 1 April 1865) was a British Army general.

== Life ==
Guise was born at Elmore, Gloucestershire, the second son of John Guise of Highnam Court, who was created a baronet in 1783, and died in 1794; his mother was the daughter and heiress of Thomas Wright. He was appointed ensign in the 70th (Surrey) Regiment of Foot on 4 November 1794, and was transferred the year after to the 3rd Foot Guards, later the Scots Guards, in which he became lieutenant and captain in 1798, captain and lieutenant-colonel in 1805, and regimental first major in 1814.

Guise served with his regiment in the Ferrol Expedition, Vigo, and Cadiz in 1800, in Egypt in 1801, in Hanover in 1805–06, and accompanied it to Portugal in 1809. He was present at the Battle of Bussaco, and commanded the light companies of the guards, with some companies of the 95th Rifles attached, at the Battle of Fuentes de Oñoro. He commanded the first battalion 3rd Guards in the Peninsular War of 1812–14, including the Battle of Salamanca, the capture of Madrid, the Siege of Burgos and subsequent retreat, the Battle of Vittoria, the Battle of the Bidassoa, the Battle of the Nive, and the passage of the Adour. At the investment of and repulse of the sortie from Bayonne, he succeeded to the command of the second brigade of Guards when Maj-Gen Edward Stopford was wounded (gold cross and war medal).

Guise became a major-general in 1819, was appointed CB in 1831, became a lieutenant-general and KCB in 1841, colonel 85th light infantry in 1847, general 1851, and was made GCB 1863. He succeeded to the baronetcy on the death of his brother Berkeley, the second baronet, in 1834. In 1863 he was granted heraldic supporters (usually only borne by peers) to descend to heirs male of the body on succession to the baronetcy.

In 1839 he was recorded as being a victim of crime. In the Registers of Prisoners, two sisters (one aged 25 and the other 15) were convicted of stealing a quantity of wood belonging to Sir John and served a short time in prison in the Littledean House of Correction.

At the time of his death, Guise was senior general in the Army List. It took place at Elmore Court on 1 April 1865, at the age of 87.

== Family ==
Guise married in 1815 Charlotte Diana, daughter of John Vernon of Clontarf Castle, Dublin. They had seven children:

- Jane Elizabeth Guise (d. 20 Feb 1897) married John Wingfield-Stratford, grandson of Richard Wingfield, 3rd Viscount Powerscourt. They had seven sons, and six daughters.
- Georgiana Maria Guise (d. 23 Nov 1859) married Capt. Henry Thomas Howard, son of Thomas Howard, 16th Earl of Suffolk and Countess Elizabeth Jane Dutton. They had one daughter that survived childhood, Elizabeth Frances.
- Sir William Vernon Guise, 4th Baronet (19 Aug 1816 - 24 Sep 1887). He married Margaret Anna Maria Lee-Warner, daughter of Rev. Daniel Henry Lee-Warner. They had three sons, and seven daughters.
- Major Henry John Guise (25 Aug 1817 - 4 Jun 1857). He married Frederica Verner, daughter of Sir William Verner, 1st Baronet and Harriet Wingfield (the daughter of the Viscount Powerscourt). They had at least two sons.
- Francis Edward Guise (20 Apr 1820 - 20 Jan 1893). He married Henrietta Carnac, daughter of Sir James Rivett-Carnac, 1st Baronet. They had four sons, and a daughter.
- Reverend Vernon George Guise (5 Sep 1823 - 10 Mar 1861) married Mary Harriet Lane. They had three sons.
- Lt.-Gen. John Christopher Guise, V.C. (27 Jul 1826 - 5 Feb 1895). Married Isabella Newcombe, daughter of Reverend Arthur Newcombe and Hon. Catherine Wingfield (also a daughter of the Viscount Powerscourt). They had two son, and two daughters.

Of the several estates he inherited from his brother in 1834, he sold Rendcombe, Eighnam and Brockworth, retaining Highnam, Elmore and Rodley.

== Notes ==
Baronetage of Great Britain
Preceded by Berkeley Guise	Baronet (of Highnam); 1834–1865	Succeeded by William Vernon Guise

Attribution

This article incorporates text from a publication now in the public domain: Stephen, Leslie; Lee, Sidney, eds. (1890). "Guise, John Wright". Dictionary of National Biography. Vol. 23. London: Smith, Elder & Co.
