= Augustus Macdonald =

British Whig politician and writer

The Hon. Augustus Henry Moreton Macdonald of Largie (24 June 1804 – 14 February 1862), born Augustus Moreton, was a British Whig politician and writer.

== Background ==
Born Augustus Moreton, Macdonald was a younger son of Thomas Reynolds-Moreton, 1st Earl of Ducie, and Lady Frances, daughter of Henry Herbert, 1st Earl of Carnarvon. Henry Reynolds-Moreton, 2nd Earl of Ducie, was his elder brother.

== Political career ==
Macdonald was elected Member of Parliament for Gloucestershire West in 1832, a seat he held until 1835, and then represented Gloucestershire East between 1835 and 1841. He was also a campaigner for homeopathy. In 1836 he published the work Civilisation, or, a Brief Analysis of the Natural Laws that Regulate the Numbers and Condition of Mankind.

== Family ==
Macdonald married Mary Jane, daughter of Sir Charles Macdonald-Lockhart, 2nd Baronet, in 1837, and later assumed the surname of Macdonald in lieu of his patronymic. They had two sons, and five daughters. She died in December 1851. Macdonald survived her by eleven years and died in February 1862, aged 57. He rebuilt Largie Castle on a new site at Tayinloan.

Parliament of the United Kingdom
New constituency	Member of Parliament for Gloucestershire West; 1832–1835; With: Hon. Grantley Berkeley	Succeeded by Hon. Grantley Berkeley; The Marquess of Worcester
Preceded by Hon. Henry Reynolds-Moreton; Sir Christopher William Codrington	Member of Parliament for Gloucestershire East; 1835–1841; With: Sir Christopher William Codrington	Succeeded by Sir Christopher William Codrington; Hon. Francis Charteris
