= Edmund Parker, 4th Earl of Morley =

British peer and Devon landowner

Edmund Robert Parker, 4th Earl of Morley JP (19 April 1877 – 10 October 1951), styled Viscount Boringdon from his birth until 1905, was a British peer and Devon landowner.

== Early life ==
Edmund Parker was the son of Albert Parker, 3rd Earl of Morley, by his marriage to Margaret Holford. He was educated at Wixenford, Eton, and Trinity College, Cambridge.

The young Viscount Boringdon was physically weak and had dyslexia. His career at Eton came to an end after only two years, following an attack of scarlet fever, with his head master writing witheringly of him "Spelling ludicrous; even in words of one syllable the order of letters is often reversed". Fortunately, this was an age when difficulty in reading and writing was no obstacle to gaining entry to Cambridge, and Boringdon graduated Bachelor of Arts in due course.

== Career ==
Boringdon succeeded his father as Earl of Morley on 26 February 1905 and took his seat on the Liberal Unionist benches in the House of Lords.

He was commissioned as a Second lieutenant in the Royal 1st Devon Yeomanry, and promoted to Lieutenant on 3 May 1902. He later joined the Territorial Forces Reserve, in which he rose to the rank of captain, and was a Justice of the Peace for Devon. During the First World War, he served at the headquarters of XI Corps.

The 4th Earl of Morley died unmarried on 10 October 1951, to be succeeded by his younger brother Montagu Brownlow Parker, who also died unmarried in 1963. He was succeeded by the brothers' nephew, Lieutenant-Colonel John St Aubyn Parker.

Peerage of the United Kingdom
Preceded by Albert Edmund Parker	Earl of Morley; 1905–1951	Succeeded by Montagu Brownlow Parker
