= Montagu Parker, 5th Earl of Morley =

British aristocrat and army officer

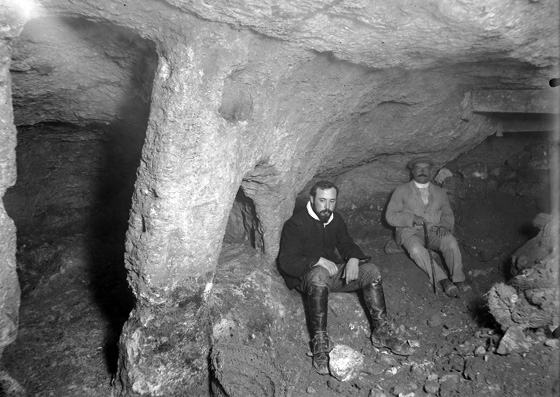
Valter Juvelius (left) around 1909–1911 in Jerusalem near Warren's Shaft

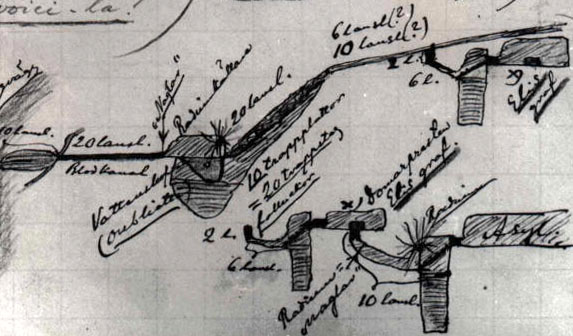
Handwritten notes of Valter Juvelius (vers 1918–1920)

Montagu Brownlow Parker, 5th Earl of Morley (13 October 1878 – 28 April 1962) was a British aristocrat and army officer. He became famous for the eponymous expedition he led to Jerusalem, which started in 1909, in which he searched for the Ark of the Covenant and other treasures for the First Temple.

== Biography ==
Parker was the second son of Albert Edmund Parker, 3rd Earl of Morley, and was educated at Eton.

He was commissioned into the British Army as a second lieutenant in the Grenadier Guards on 20 May 1899, and was promoted to lieutenant on 28 January 1900. He served with the 2nd battalion of his regiment in the Second Boer War in 1900 and 1902, where he was wounded. After the end of the war, he was from May 1902 Aide-de-camp to Major-General Laurence Oliphant, in Command of the Potchefstroom District, returning home six months later in December 1902. Oliphant took the Command of the Home District from 1 January 1903, and selected Parker to continue as his ADC. He was later promoted captain, and retired from the army.

Montagu Parker led the "Parker Expedition", which carried out excavations searching for treasure from Solomon's Temple between 1909 and 1911. The expedition was launched after Valter Henrik Juvelius convinced a group of upper-class Englishmen that he had discovered secret cyphers in the Bible which detailed the location of the Ark and other Temple treasures. They formed a syndicate named after their initials. It was known as the J.M.P.V.F. Syndicate from Juvelius, Millen, Parker, Vaughan and Fort. The syndicate secured the agreement of the Ottoman Imperial government for the project on the basis that the proceeds of any finds would be split 50:50 between the syndicate and the Ottoman government. Neil Asher Silberman described the expedition as "Conceived in folly, but planned with cunning, the Parker Mission had come to Jerusalem with a single goal: to locate and unearth the fantastic treasure of Solomon’s Temple buried beneath the Temple Mount." They concentrated their digging on the system of tunnels and shafts which had been explored by Sir Charles Warren fifty years previously including the Gihon Spring, the Siloam Tunnel, Warren's Shaft and the Pool of Siloam. One of the expedition members Cyril Foley wrote that Juvelius' ‘rendering of the Hebrew text denoted that the Ark of the Covenant could be found by working through underground passages from Gihon, which would lead us up to the mosque (of Omar)’. They dug in 1909, 1910 and 1911. In April 1911 they bribed the guardian of the Haram al-Sharif to let them dig in the Dome of the Rock. They were discovered and riots and disorder broke out. The expedition left Jerusalem determined to return as they believed that they were very close to finding the Ark.

When the First World War started Montagu Parker rejoined the British army and served in Egypt and France. From 1916 to the end of the war he was under the command of General Alexander Godley and served with the II Anzac Corps and then the XXII British Corps. He was mentioned in despatches and in 1918 was awarded the Croix de Guerre by the French when the XXII Corps helped stop and then reverse a German advance which was part of the Kaiserschlacht on key areas of the Champagne region.

He inherited the earldom and other titles in 1951 after the death of his older brother Edmund Robert Parker, 4th Earl of Morley.

British businessman Alistair McAlpine, then a young man, met Lord Morley on the maiden voyage of the SS Oriana in the late 1950s, and later wrote of the experience in his memoir:

Another passenger, Lord Morley, was a singular old man (..) Lord Morley was old and doddery, but he had been a fine young fellow in his time. A Guards Officer at the time of the Boer War (..) (He) survived well into his nineties (sic). Old and doddery he may well have been on that trip out to Australia, but when we reached the great continent, and a number of the extremely elegant young ladies boarded the Oriana for its return voyage to England, he perked up no end.

Lord Morley died at the age of 83 in 1962. He was unmarried and was succeeded in the earldom and other titles by his younger brother's son John St Aubyn Parker, 6th Earl of Morley.

=== Hughes Vincent Map ===
The first expedition map documented the location of tunnels and artifacts discovered in and on the bedrock in the areas around Warrens Shaft on the eastern slopes of the mountain above the Spring Citadel over the Gihon Spring. In recent years, archaeologists Ronny Reich and Eli Shukron verified many of the map elements.

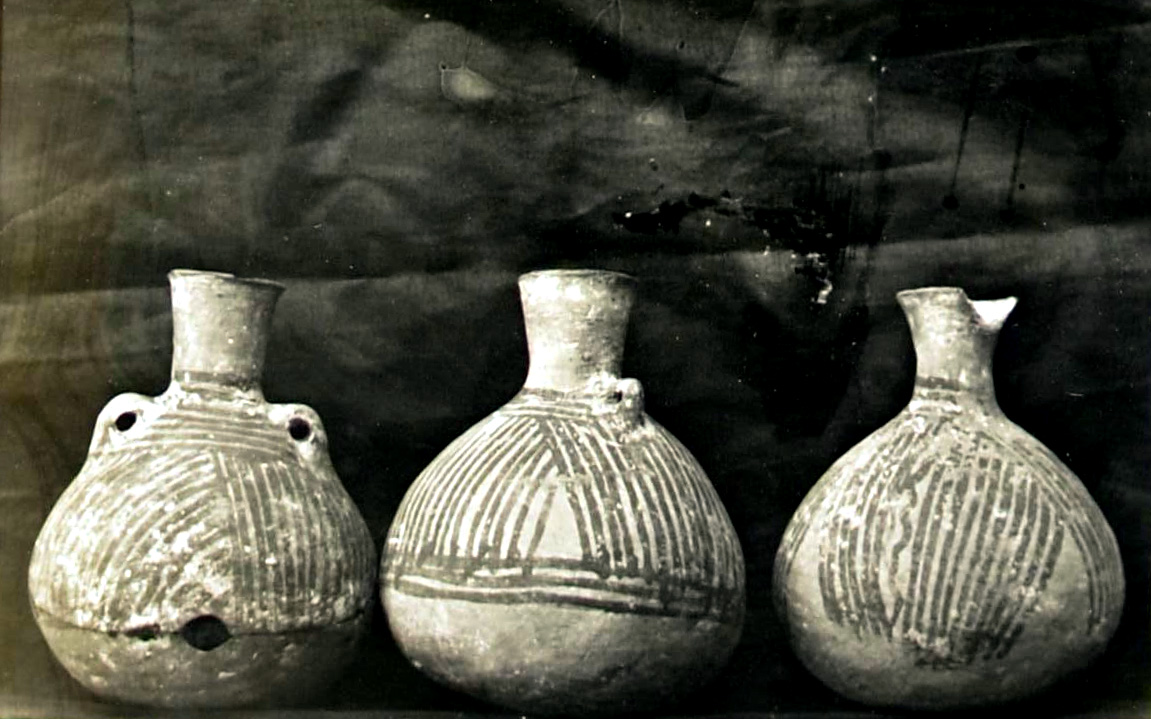
Pottery from the Parker excavation

Peerage of the United Kingdom
Preceded by Edmund Parker	Earl of Morley; 1951–1962	Succeeded by John Parker
