= Doocey =

Doocey is a surname. Notable people with the surname include:

- Dee Doocey (born 1948), British politician and businesswoman
- Matt Doocey (born 1972), New Zealand politician

== See also ==
- Doocy
