= Henry Reynolds-Moreton, 3rd Earl of Ducie =

British courtier and Liberal Party politician

The Right Honourable The Earl of Ducie GCVO PC JP FRS
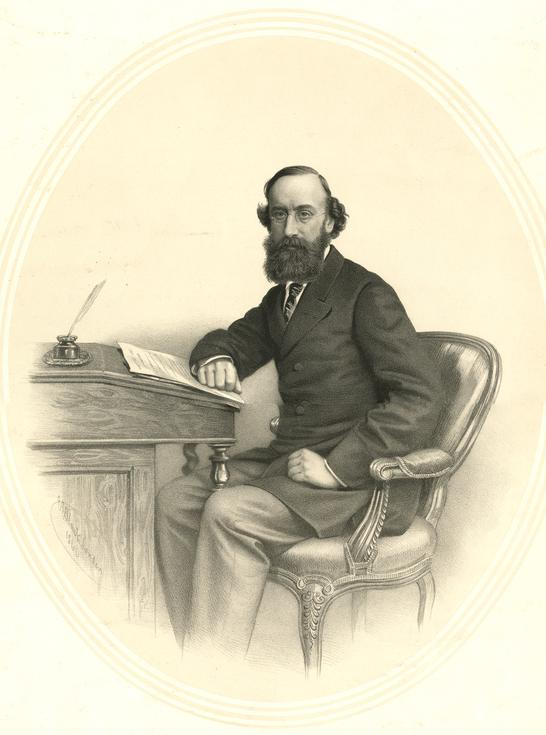
- Ducie in 1866

Captain of the Yeomen of the Guard
- In office 28 June 1859 – 26 June 1866
- Monarch: Victoria
- Prime Minister: The Viscount Palmerston; The Earl Russell
- Preceded by: The Lord de Ros
- Succeeded by: The Earl Cadogan

Personal details
- Born: 25 June 1827
- Died: 28 October 1921 (aged 94)
- Party: Liberal Party
- Spouse: Julia Langston (d. 1895)

Henry John Reynolds-Moreton, 3rd Earl of Ducie GCVO PC JP FRS (25 June 1827 – 28 October 1921), styled Lord Moreton between 1840 and 1853, was a British courtier and Liberal Party politician. He notably served as Captain of the Yeomen of the Guard from 1859 to 1866, and Lord Warden of the Stannaries from 1888 to 1908.

== Background and education ==
Moreton was born on 25 June 1827 at Sherborne, Gloucestershire, the eldest son of Henry Reynolds-Moreton, 2nd Earl of Ducie, and his wife, Elizabeth Dutton, daughter of John Dutton, 2nd Baron Sherborne. He was educated at Eton.

== Political career ==
In 1852, Moreton entered Parliament as Member of Parliament (MP) for Stroud. The following year he succeeded his father in the earldom and entered the House of Lords. In 1859 he was admitted to the Privy Council and appointed Captain of the Yeomen of the Guard under Lord Palmerston, a post he held until the government fell in 1866, the last year under the premiership of Lord Russell.

== Other honours ==
Apart from his political career, Lord Ducie was Lord Lieutenant of Gloucestershire between 1857 and 1911 and Lord Warden of the Stannaries in Cornwall and member of the Council of the Prince of Wales between 1888 and 1908. In 1906 he was made a Knight Grand Cross of the Royal Victorian Order.

The earl was appointed Honorary Colonel of the 1st Administrative Battalion, Gloucestershire Rifle Volunteer Corps on 16 June 1868 and held the position for 40 years. The battalion later became the 2nd Volunteer Battalion, Gloucestershire Regiment.

== Family ==
Lord Ducie married his first cousin, Julia Langston, daughter of James Langston, MP, on 24 May 1849. They had two children:

- Henry Haughton Reynolds-Moreton, Lord Moreton (1857–1920), politician.
- Lady Constance Emily Reynolds-Moreton (18 June 1850 – 27 February 1929), married George Shaw-Lefevre, 1st Baron Eversley.

The Countess of Ducie died in February 1895 and Lord Ducie remained a widower until his death at Gloucester in October 1921, aged 94. As his only son had predeceased him, Lord Ducie's titles passed to his younger brother, Berkeley Moreton, 4th Earl of Ducie.

== Tortworth Court ==
Between 1848 and 1853 he had Tortworth Court built where he then lived. During his long life he spent much time acquiring unusual and exotic plants from around the world to plant in the grounds of Tortworth Court. He also collected unusual local plants, being among the first to grow the corkscrew hazel. Many of the plants remain and the grounds now comprises one of the great arboretums of England.

== Literary efforts ==
In 1872, a short article by the third earl entitled Crocodile shooting was published in Land and Water. It is available online through the Open Library.

== Sport ==
The Earl was a minor cricketer. He played one match at county level for Shropshire in 1862, making 5 runs, while playing at club level for Shrewsbury. Knightley William Horlock, who sometimes wrote under the pen name, "Scurator", dedicated his book Letters on the Management of Hounds, a treatise on venery, to the Earl, who was his Patron.

== Arms ==
Coat of arms of Henry Reynolds-Moreton, 3rd Earl of Ducie
Coronet A Coronet of an Earl Crest A Moorcock's Head Or combed and wattled Gules between two Wings displayed Azure Escutcheon Quarterly: 1st and 4th, Argent a Chevron Gules between three Square Buckles Sable (Moreton); 2nd and 3rd, Or two Lions passant guardant Gules (Ducie) Supporters On either side a Unicorn Argent armed unguled maned and tufted Or, each gorged with a Ducal Coronet per pale Gold and Gules Motto Perseverando (By persevering)

Parliament of the United Kingdom
Preceded by George Julius Poulett Scrope; William Stanton	Member of Parliament for Stroud; 1852 – 1853; With: George Julius Poulett Scrope	Succeeded by George Julius Poulett Scrope; Edward Horsman
Political offices
Preceded by The Lord de Ros	Captain of the Yeomen of the Guard; 1859–1866	Succeeded by The Earl Cadogan
Honorary titles
Preceded by The Earl FitzHardinge	Lord Lieutenant of Gloucestershire; 1857–1911	Succeeded by The Earl Beauchamp
Preceded by The Viscount Portman	Lord Warden of the Stannaries; 1888–1908	Succeeded by The Lord Balfour of Burleigh
Preceded by The Duke of Rutland	Senior Privy Counsellor; 1906–1921; With: The Earl Spencer (1906–1910)	Succeeded by The Duke of Connaught and Strathearn
Peerage of the United Kingdom
Preceded by Henry Reynolds-Moreton	Earl of Ducie; 1853–1921	Succeeded by Berkeley Moreton
