= Tortworth Court =

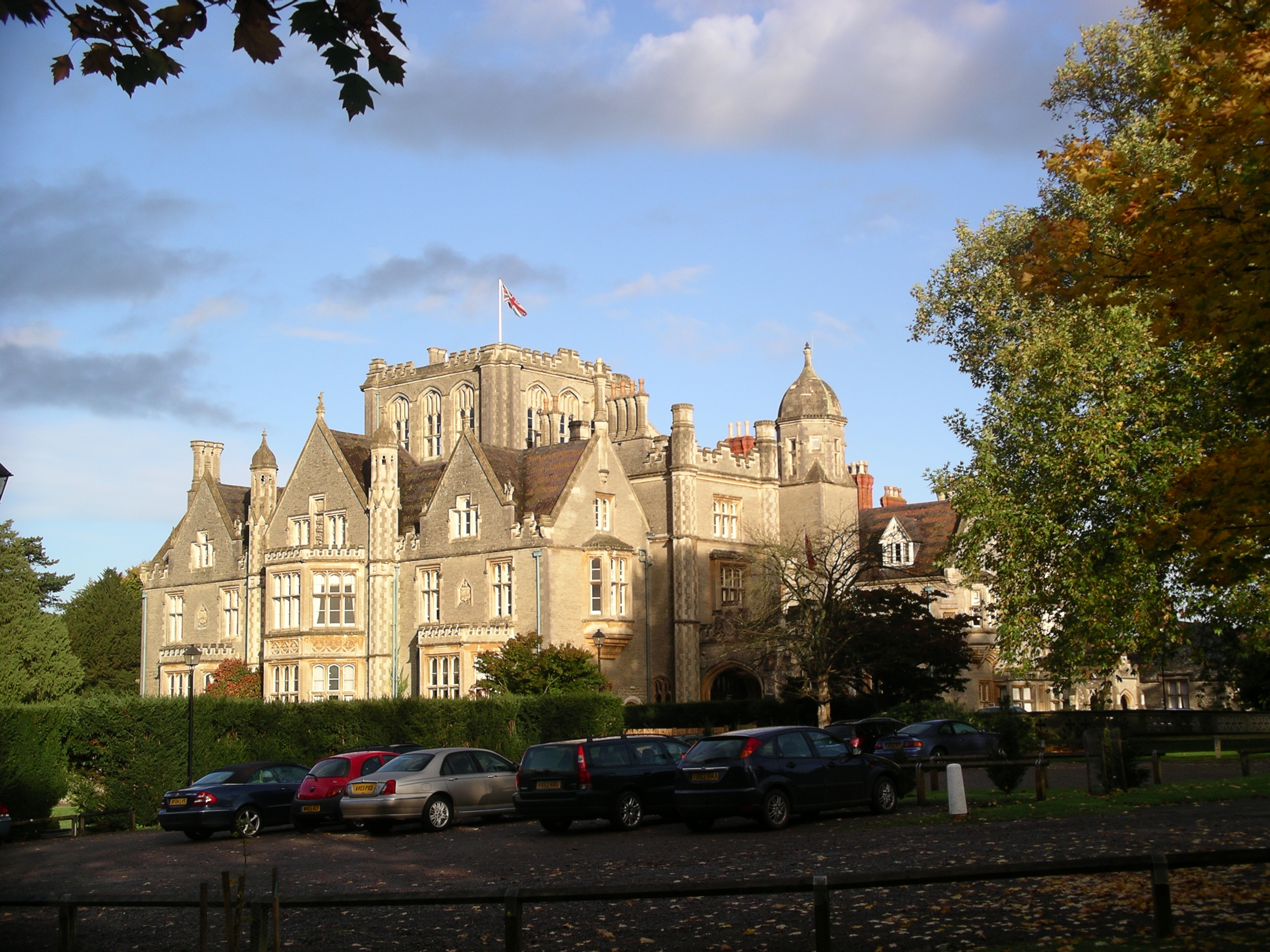
- Front view of Tortworth Court

- Location in Gloucestershire
- 51°37′50.88″N 02°26′19.03″W
- Location: Thornbury, Gloucestershire, England

Tortworth Court is a Victorian mansion in Tortworth near Thornbury, South Gloucestershire. England. It was built in Tudor style for the 2nd Earl of Ducie. It is a Grade II* listed building.

== History ==
The mansion was built, in Tudor style, for the 2nd Earl of Ducie between 1848 and 1853. Its architect was Samuel Sanders Teulon.

During World War II the mansion became a naval training base for coding and signals, under the name of HMS Cabbala, and a mast was erected in the high reception hall. After the war, the buildings constructed for the hospital and, for a time the house itself, became HM Prison Leyhill. Tortworth Court was then used as a training school for prison officers.

The property was designated a Grade II* listed by English Heritage on 9 July 1991. By the 1990s, however, it had become derelict, and suffered a large fire in 1991. It was thereafter restored to its original style and extended at a reputed cost of £20 million. In June 2001, it reopened as a hotel operated by Principal Hotel Company and is now operated by De Vere.

== Arboretum ==
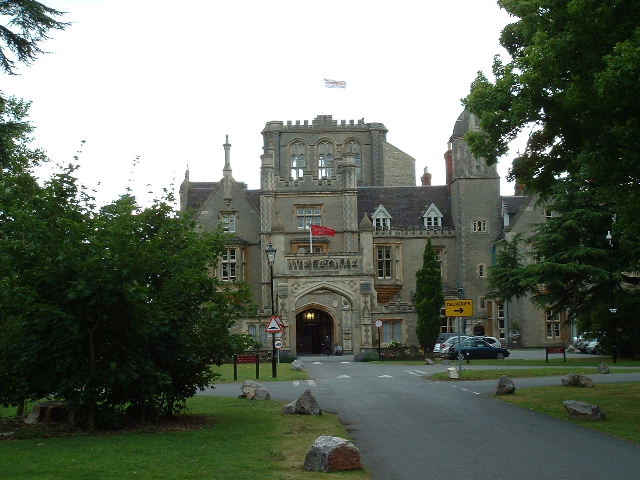
Tortworth Court, entrance

Tortworth Court is especially notable for its extensive arboretum developed by the 3rd Earl of Ducie, who began planting upon inheriting the property from his father in 1853 and continued until his death in 1921. The collection has fine examples of rhododendron, conifer, oak and maple. The arboretum once surrounded the property and continues to be maintained and supported. Accessible by a public footpath, it is now divided between the hotel grounds, the grounds of Leyhill Prison, the Dell which is privately owned and managed as a community woodland by Tortworth Forest Centre CIC, and private land still owned and farmed by the Ducie family. Rivalling at the time the collection of George Holford at nearby Westonbirt Arboretum, it still contains, despite the ravages of time, more than 300 specimens, including unusual and rare species and many fine specimen trees.

Tortworth Court gave its name to Saint class steam locomotive No. 2955 operated by the Great Western Railway.
