= Berkeley Guise =

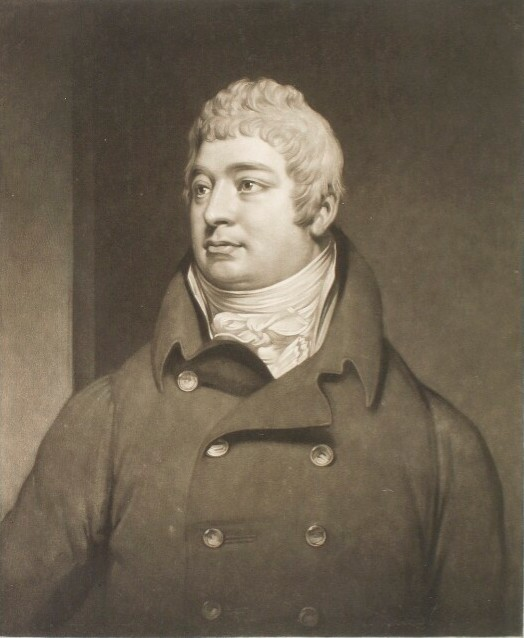
Sir Berkeley Guise, 2nd Baronet

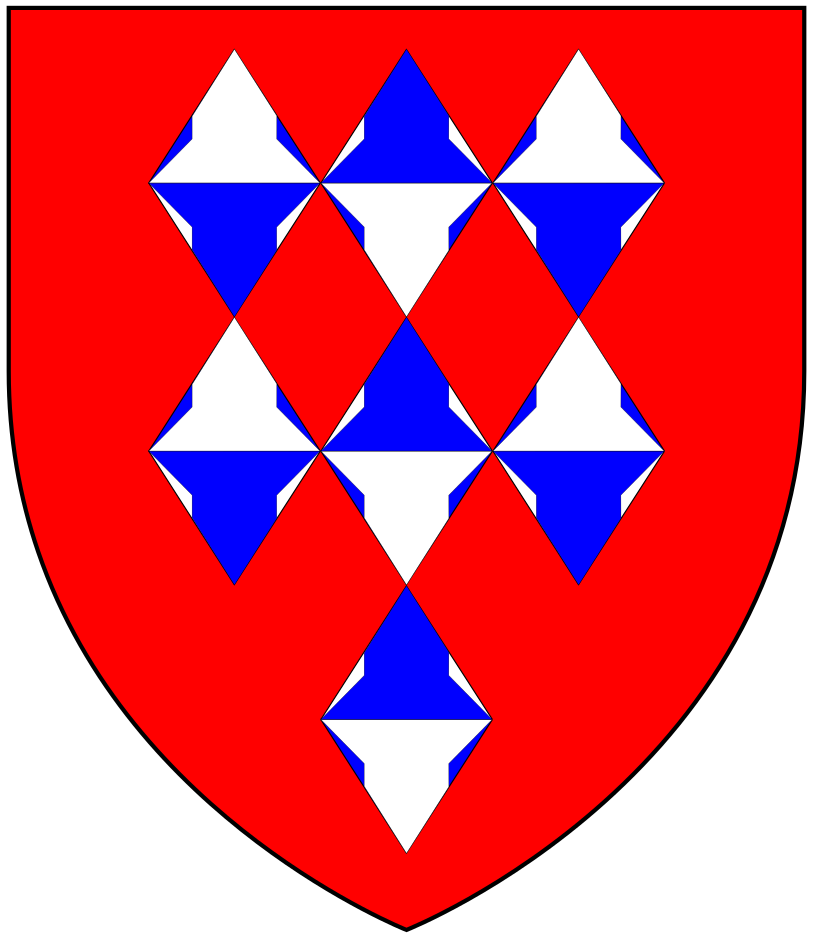
Arms of Guise: Gules, seven lozenges conjoined vairé three, three and one

Sir Berkeley William Guise, 2nd Baronet (14 July 1775 – 23 July 1834) of Highnam Court in the parish of Churcham, Gloucestershire, was a British landowner and Whig Member of Parliament.

== Origins ==
He was the eldest son of Sir John Guise, 1st Baronet (1733–1794), of Highnam Court, whom he succeeded in 1794, inheriting Highnam Court. He also inherited the Gloucestershire estates of Elmore Court, the original seat of the Guise family, and Rendcomb, on the death in 1807 of his cousin Jane Guise, wife of Shute Barrington (1734–1826), Bishop of Durham.

== Career ==
He was educated at Eton College (1791) and at Christ Church, Oxford (1794). In 1801 he was appointed verderer and deputy warden of the Forest of Dean, which office he retained until his death. In 1807 he was appointed Sheriff of the City of Gloucester and in 1813 as Mayor of Gloucester. He was commissioned as a captain in the North Gloucestershire Militia on 8 June 1798, and on 14 April 1809 he was appointed as Lieutenant-Colonel Commandant to raise the new 1st East Gloucestershire Local Militia at Gloucester.

He was a Member of Parliament for Gloucestershire from 1811 to 1832 and then an MP for one of the replacement constituencies, Gloucestershire East, from 1832 to 1834.

== Death and succession ==
He died unmarried in 1834. He was succeeded by his younger brother, General Sir John Wright Guise, 3rd Baronet (1777–1865), GCB. Highnam Court was sold to Thomas Gambier Parry.

Baronetage of Great Britain
Preceded by John Guise	Baronet (of Highnam); 1794–1834	Succeeded by John Wright Guise
