= Michael Hicks Beach =

Michael Hicks Beach or Michael Hicks-Beach may refer to:

- Michael Hicks-Beach (1760–1830), MP for Cirencester, 1794–1818
- Sir Michael Hicks Beach, 8th Baronet (1809–1854), MP for East Gloucestershire 1854
- Michael Hicks Beach, 1st Earl St Aldwyn (1837–1916), 9th Baronet, Chancellor of the Exchequer 1885–1886 & 1895–1902, Conservative leader in the House of Commons 1885–1886
- Michael Hicks Beach, Viscount Quenington (1877–1916), British politician
- Michael Hicks Beach, 2nd Earl St Aldwyn (1912–1992)
- Michael Hicks Beach, 3rd Earl St Aldwyn (born 1950)

== See also ==
- Hicks Beach baronets
