= Hatherop =

Village in Gloucestershire, England

Coordinates: 51.745°N 1.776°W

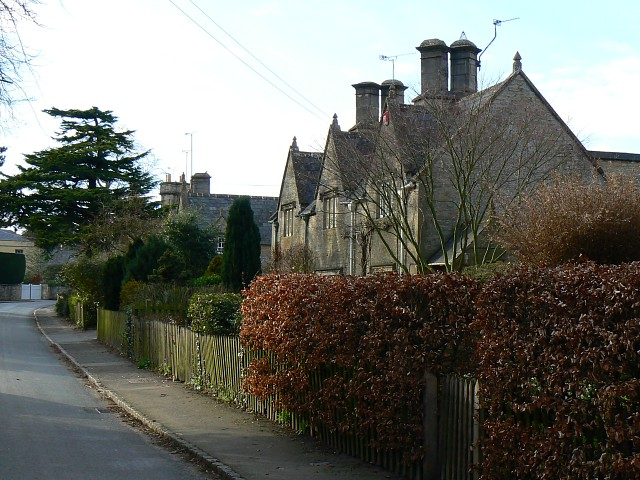
- Cottages in Hatherop

- Location within Gloucestershire
- Population: 192 (2011)
- OS grid reference: SP1505
- Civil parish: Hatherop
- District: Cotswold
- Shire county: Gloucestershire
- Region: South West
- Country: England
- Sovereign state: United Kingdom
- Post town: Cirencester
- Postcode district: GL7
- Dialling code: 01285
- Police: Gloucestershire
- Fire: Gloucestershire
- Ambulance: South Western
- UK Parliament: North Cotswolds
- Website: Hatherop Parish Council

Hatherop is a village and civil parish in the Cotswolds Area of Outstanding Natural Beauty, about 2.5 miles (4.0 km) north of Fairford in Gloucestershire, England. The River Coln forms part of the western boundary of the parish.

== Geography ==
Hatherop lies in the southern part of the Cotswolds, a range of hills designated an Area of Outstanding Natural Beauty, and is approximately 30 miles (48 km) south-east of Gloucester. It is situated about 9 miles (14 km) east of Cirencester and 3 miles (4.8 km) north of Fairford. Close by are the parishes of Coln St. Aldwyns and Quenington. The three villages lie on the edge of the parkland of 17th-century mansion Williamstrip. Nearby, to the west of Hatherop is the River Coln which flows through the Cotswolds.

== History ==
=== Etymology ===
The Domesday Book of 1086 lists Hatherop as Etherope, derived from the Old English hēah and throp meaning "high outlying farmstead".

=== Prehistoric era ===
Barrow Elm, which lies about 0.75 miles (1.21 km) southeast of the village, is a prehistoric tumulus.

=== Middle ages ===
An estate dates back to 1066 which was owned by successive Earls of Salisbury, one of whom was William Devereux. At the time of the Domesday Book, Hatherop (along with Eastleach Turville), were recorded as landholdings of Devereux, whose overlord was Roger de Lacy. It had a population of 47 families.

According to A History of the County of Somerset,

[William Longespée] appears to have contemplated the foundation of a house of Carthusian monks at Hatherop in Gloucestershire, and had not only located there some monks, but had formally conveyed to them a small estate in Chelwood.

The monks soon relocated to Hinton Priory.

Hatherop had three mills on the river Coln. At least two were used in fulling.

=== 17th century onwards ===
The village and parish adjoin the parkland of Williamstrip, a 17th-century country house that was the seat of Michael Hicks Beach, the first Earl St Aldwyn.

The architect and builder Richard Pace built Severalls as a rectory for the parish in 1833. Letchmere, a set of cottages built in 1856, was later converted into a rectory and Severalls became a private house.

The architect Henry Clutton also rebuilt the Church of England parish church of Saint Nicholas for Baron de Mauley in 1854–55.

The 3,850-acre (1,560 ha) Hatherop Estate was acquired by the trustees of the Ernest Cook Trust in 2002 from the Bazley family, who had owned the estate for more than 130 years. Following the death of Sir Thomas Bazley in 1996, his children were very keen to retain the community of the estate and avoid breaking it up. They said at the time: "One of the main factors in our decision to sell the estate to the Ernest Cook Trust is our wish to preserve the estate for future generations. We feel that selling to the Ernest Cook Trust is the best way to maintain its special character, as well as retaining the unspoilt nature of the villages of Eastleach and Hatherop, which our father valued so much."

== Education ==
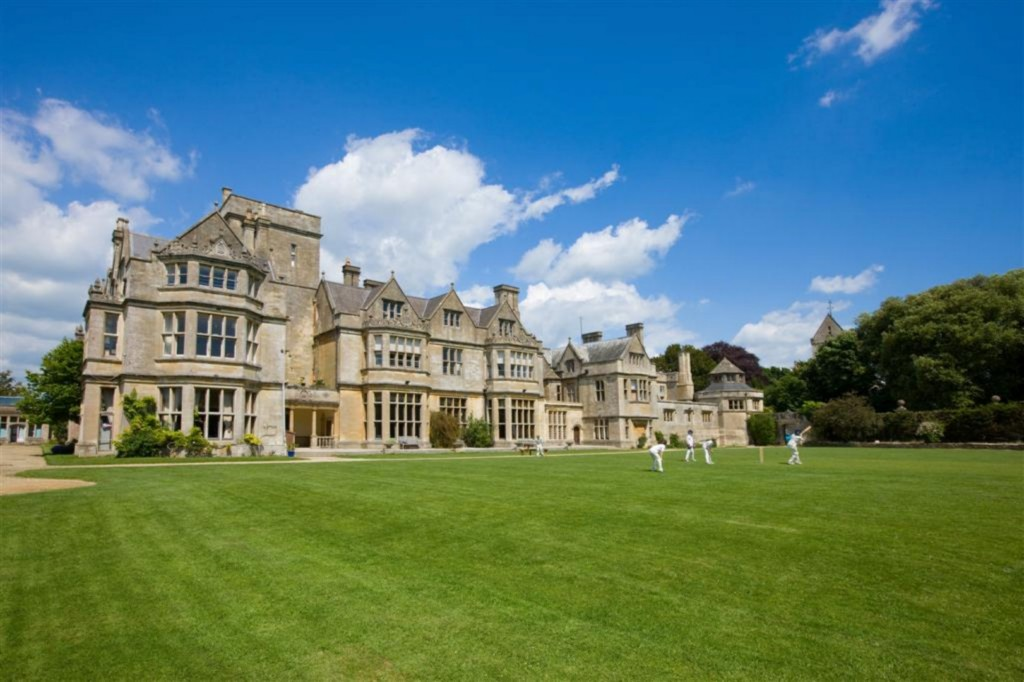
Hatherop Castle School

Hatherop Castle is now a private co-educational preparatory school. Hatherop Castle dates from the sixteenth or seventeenth century, and was also partly rebuilt by Henry Clutton for Baron de Mauley in 1850–56.

Hatherop has a Church of England primary school, which in 2006 had 68 pupils. It was built in 1856 by Ashley Ponsonby, son of Baron de Mauley.

== Governance ==
Hatherop is part of the district of Cotswold and the Parliamentary constituency of North Cotswolds, represented by Conservative Member of Parliament (MP) Sir Geoffrey Clifton-Brown. Prior to Britain leaving the European Union in January 2020 it was part of the South West England constituency of the European Parliament.

== Notable residents ==
- Hugh Longbourne Callendar - Nobel Prize in Physics-nominated scientist born in Hatherop in 1863
- Henriette Alice Abel Smith - Lady-in-Waiting to Queen Elizabeth II

== In popular culture ==
Hatherop village and Hatherop Primary School were used briefly as locations in the film The Gathering (2003).
