= Florin (British coin) =

Former coin of the United Kingdom and other territories

Two shillings One florin
- United Kingdom
- Value: 2/- (1849-1971); 10 new pence (1971–1993)
- Mass: 11.31 g
- Diameter: (1849) 28.0 mm (1851–1886) 30.0 mm (1887–1892) 29.5 mm (1893–1970) 28.5 mm
- Edge: Milled
- Composition: (1849–1919) 92.5% Ag; (1920–1946) 50% Ag; (1947–1970) Cupronickel
- Years of minting: 1849–1970

Obverse
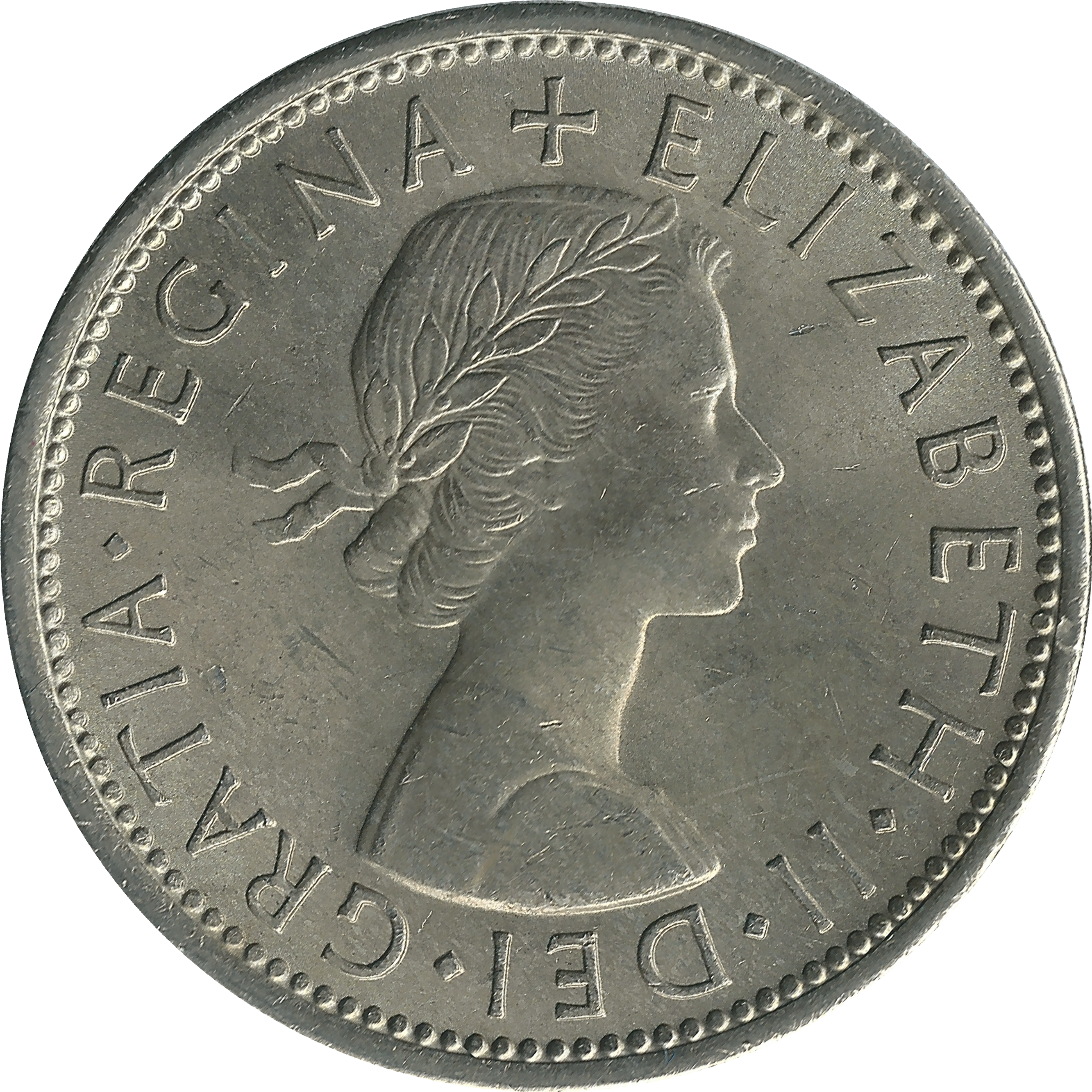
- Design: Profile of the monarch (Elizabeth II design shown)
- Designer: Mary Gillick
- Design date: 1953 (portrait); 1954 ("BRITT OMN" removed)

Reverse
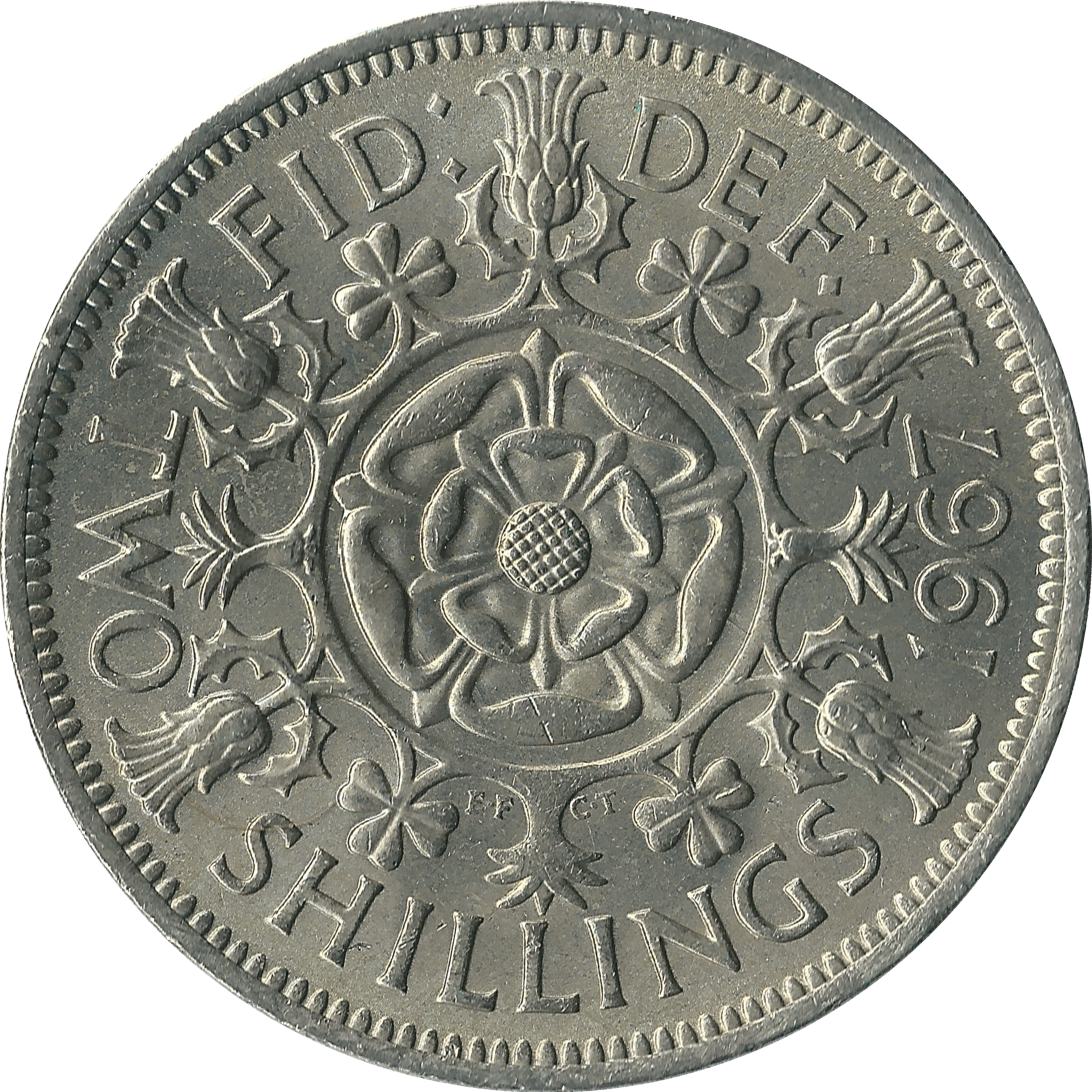
- Design: Various (floral design shown)
- Designer: Edgar Fuller and Cecil Thomas
- Design date: 1953

The British florin, or two-shilling piece (2/– or 2s.), was a denomination of sterling coinage worth 1/10 of one pound, or 24 old pence (equivalent to ten new pence). It was issued from 1849 until 1967, with a final issue for collectors dated 1970. It was the last coin circulating immediately prior to decimalisation to be demonetised, in 1993, having for a quarter of a century circulated alongside the ten-pence coin, identical in specifications and value.

The florin was introduced as part of an experiment in decimalisation that went no further at the time. The original florins, dated 1849, attracted controversy for omitting a reference to God from Queen Victoria's titles; that type is accordingly known as the "Godless florin", and was in 1851 succeeded by the "Gothic florin", for its design and style of lettering. Throughout most of its existence, the florin bore some variation of either the shields of the United Kingdom, or the emblems of its constituent nations on the reverse, a tradition broken between 1902 and 1910, when the coin featured a windswept figure of a standing Britannia.

In 1911, following the accession of George V, the florin regained the shields and sceptres design it had in the late Victorian era, and it kept that motif until 1937, when the national emblems were placed on it. The florin retained such a theme for the remainder of its run, though a new design was used from 1953, following the accession of Elizabeth II. In 1968, prior to decimalisation, the Royal Mint began striking the ten-pence piece. The old two-shilling piece remained in circulation until the ten-pence piece was made smaller in 1992. The older ten-pence coins and the pre-decimal florin were both demonetised in 1993.

== History ==
=== Background ===
The drive for decimalisation of the currency in Britain dates as far back as 1682. Although nothing was done about early proposals, the adoption of decimal currencies in the United States, France and other nations in the late 18th and early 19th centuries renewed the call, and commissions in 1841 and 1843 called for the adoption of decimal coinage. In 1847, a motion was introduced in Parliament by Sir John Bowring calling for the introduction of a decimal currency and the striking of coins of one-tenth and one-hundredth of a pound. Bowring obtained surprisingly strong support for his motion, and the Russell government promised that a coin valued at one-tenth of a pound (two shillings) would be produced to test public opinion, with consideration to be given in future to the introduction of other decimal coins.

There was much discussion about what the coin should be called – centum, decade, and dime were among the suggestions – before florin was eventually settled upon, not because of the old English coin of that name, but because the Netherlands had a florin, or gulden, about that size and value. The original florin, the fiorino d'oro of the Republic of Florence, was a gold coin struck from 1252 to 1533.

=== Victorian issues (1849–1901) ===
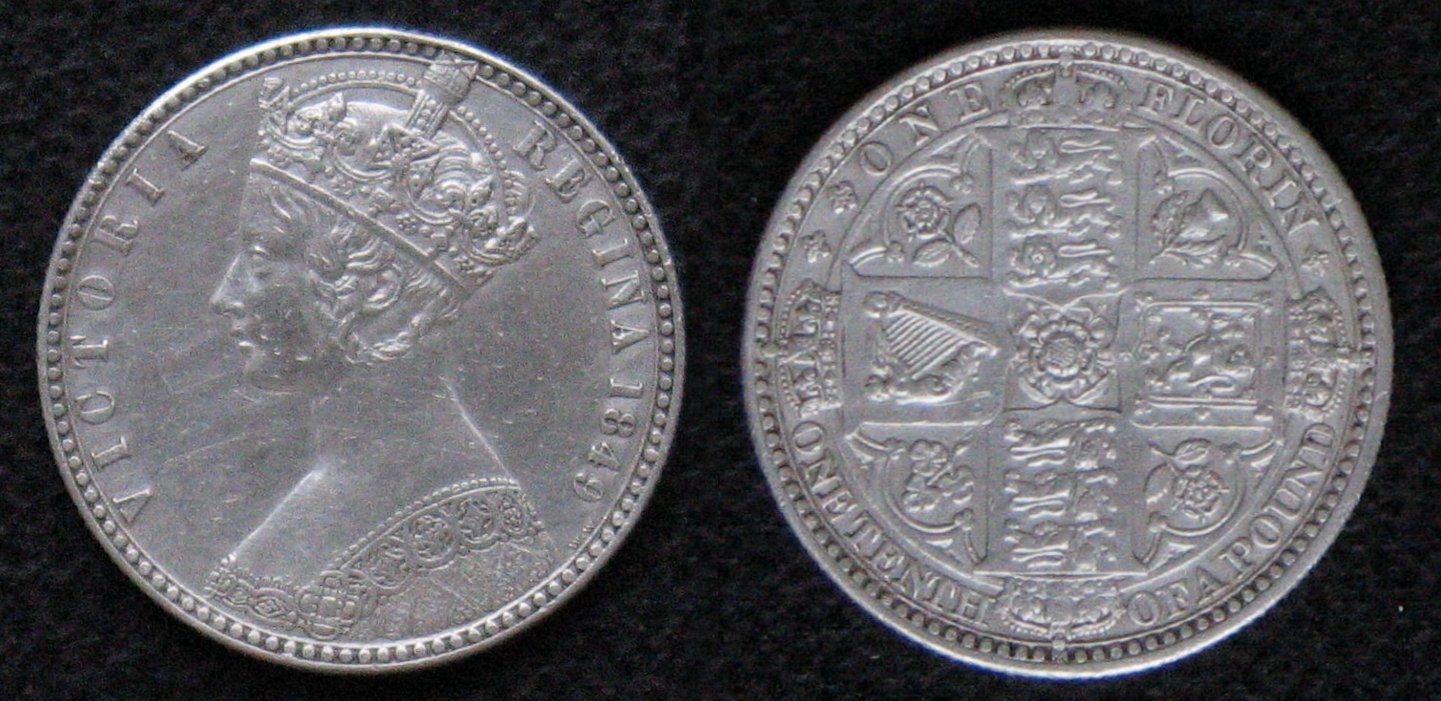
The 1849 "Godless florin"

The first florins were struck in 1849. They were in the Gothic style, and featured a portrait of Queen Victoria as a very young woman, with the crowned shields of England (twice, per the usual arrangement of the royal coat of arms of the United Kingdom as used in England), Scotland, and Ireland arranged in a cruciform pattern shown on the reverse, and the nations' floral emblems in the angles (again with England's shown twice). The new florin closely resembles the Gothic crown of 1847; the obverse for both was designed by the Chief Engraver of the Royal Mint, William Wyon, while the reverse of both was designed by William Dyce. Unlike the crown's Gothic script, the 1849 florin has Roman lettering. The 1849 florin, issued in silver, weighed 11.3 grams (defined as 4/11 troy ounce) and had a diameter of 28 millimetres (1.10 in). The new coin made clear its value with the inscription ONE FLORIN ONE TENTH OF A POUND on the reverse. To aid in the decimal experiment, the half crown (two shillings and sixpence, or one-eighth of a pound), near to the florin in size and value, was not issued between 1850 and 1874, when it was struck again at the request of the banks, and surveys found that both coins played useful parts in commerce. Each continued to be struck, and circulated together, until decimalisation.

These first coins were probably a shock to the public, as for the first time in nearly 200 years a British coin featured a portrait of the monarch wearing a crown. Even more of a shock, including (allegedly) to Queen Victoria herself, was the inscription on the obverse, VICTORIA REGINA 1849, (Note: Victoria, Queen) omitting the usual D G for Dei Gratia (By the Grace of God) from the coin's inscription. This resulted in it being known as the "Godless florin". Further controversy was caused by the omission of the usual abbreviation F D for Fidei Defensor (Defender of the Faith): the Master of the Mint, Richard Lalor Sheil, an Irishman and a Roman Catholic, was suspected by some of plotting to overthrow the Protestant regime. The inscription had in fact been suggested by Prince Albert, Victoria's husband. Sheil said in the House of Commons that the inscription had been a mistake, and the florin was redesigned for its next issue in 1851.

The revised florin's diameter was increased to 30 millimetres (1.18 in) (the weight was unchanged), and all the lettering on the coin was in Gothic script, resulting in it being known as the Gothic florin. The coin was by the same designers; its date was rendered in Roman numerals. The bust of Victoria and the heraldry on the reverse were largely unchanged. The Latin inscription on the obverse read VICTORIA D G BRITT REG F D (Note: Victoria Dei Gratia Britanniae Regina Fidei Defensor, or Victoria by the Grace of God Queen of Britain Defender of the Faith) with the date, while the reverse read ONE FLORIN ONE TENTH OF A POUND. Despite a Royal Commission, the drive for decimalisation soon died out; there was only lukewarm support for an 1855 motion in the Commons applauding the issuance of the florin and seeking further decimal coins. The Gothic Florin was produced each year until 1887, excepting 1861 and 1882. From 1864 until 1879, many florins were struck with die numbers on the obverse (found to the right of Victoria's brooch, possibly part of a Mint investigation into how long it took coinage dies to wear out. Beginning with some 1867 issues, BRIT on the obverse was rendered BRITT, following the Latin practice in abbreviations of doubling a final consonant for a plural. Thus, Victoria's title changed from "Queen of Britain" to "Queen of the Britains", including the colonies and other territories.

In 1887, as part of a coinage redesign for Victoria's Golden Jubilee, a new obverse design, showing the queen as an older woman, debuted on the gold and silver coinage. This was dubbed the "Jubilee coinage" and was by Sir Joseph Boehm. The various flora were removed from the florin's reverse and were replaced by sceptres between the shields with a Garter Star in the centre. The Jubilee Head quickly proved unpopular, due in part to the crown worn by the Queen, which was deemed ridiculously small. The Jubilee florin shared its reverse with the short-lived double florin, which Gertrude Rawlings in 1898 described as "radiating kitchen pokers and tea trays". The reverse design was created and engraved by Leonard Charles Wyon (who also engraved the obverse), though it was probably influenced by the gold coinage of Charles II designed by John Roettier. The diameter was reduced to 29.5 millimetres (1.16 in). All the inscriptions were in Latin letters and Arabic numerals. The inscription on the obverse read VICTORIA DEI GRATIA, while the reverse read FID DEF BRITT REG, (Note: Victoria Dei Gratia Britanniarum Regina Fidei Defensor, or Victoria by the Grace of God Queen of the Britains, Defender of the Faith) with no indication of the value. The Jubilee florin was struck each year between 1887 and 1892.

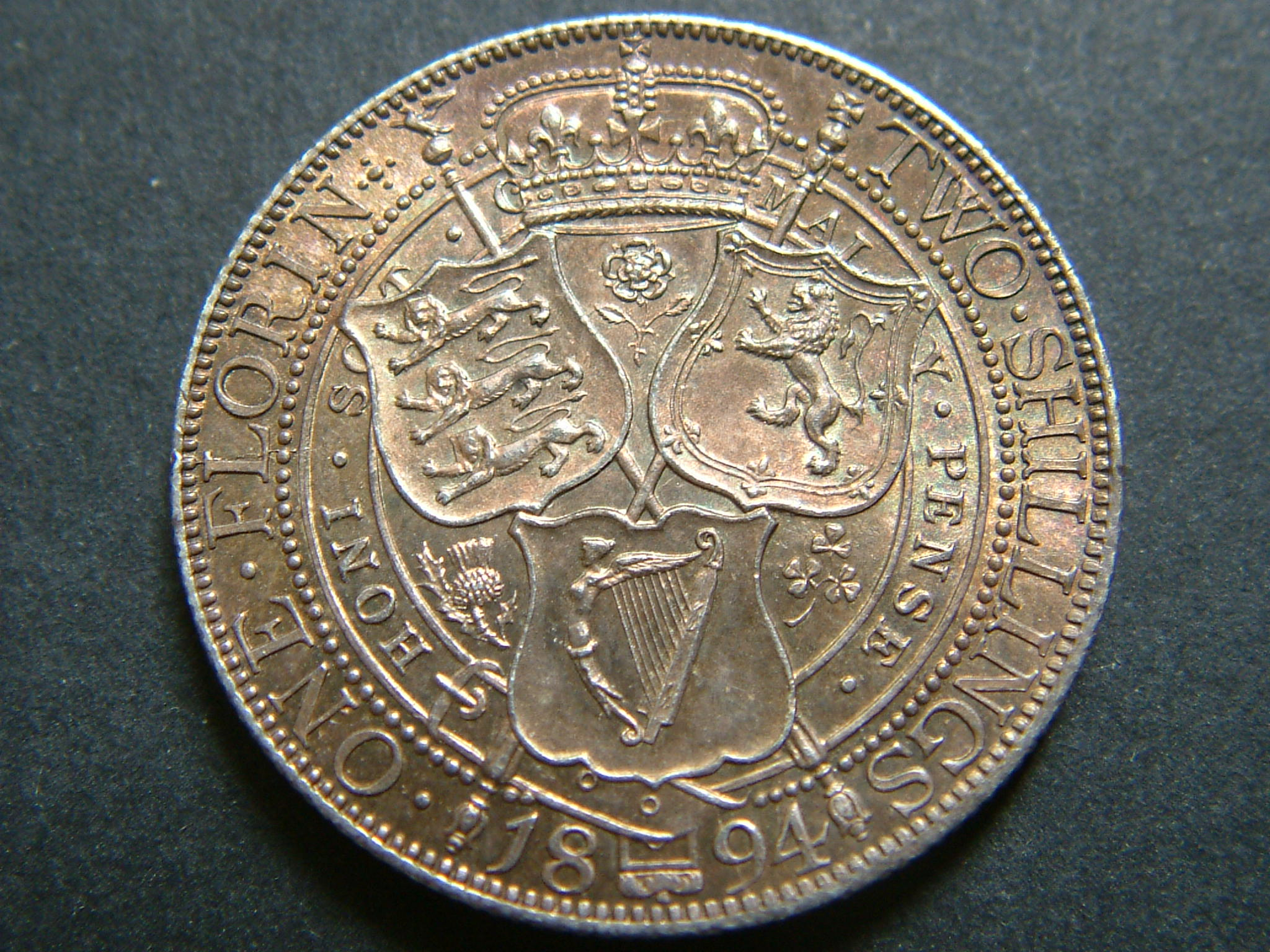
The 1894 florin was designed by Sir Edward Poynter.

Given the unpopularity of the Jubilee bust, a committee was set up in February 1891 to recommend new designs. An obverse designed by Thomas Brock was selected, and the committee also recommended some new reverses. This advisory committee recommended a different bust (also by Brock) be used on the florin to distinguish it from the half crown. The recommendation was not accepted, and the florin used the same "Veiled Head" or "Old Head" obverse that was introduced to the silver and gold coinage in 1893. To better distinguish it from the half crown, the diameter was reduced from 29 to 28.5 millimetres (1.14 to 1.12 in). The obverse was inscribed VICTORIA DEI GRA BRITT REGINA FID DEF IND IMP, (Note: Victoria Dei Gratia Britanniarum Regina Fidei Defensor Indiae Imperatrix, or Victoria, by the Grace of God Queen of the Britains, Defender of the Faith, Empress of India) together with a new reverse showing three shields separated by a rose, shamrock, and thistle (symbolising England, Ireland, and Scotland) under a crown, and the inscription ONE FLORIN TWO SHILLINGS. This reverse was created by Sir Edward Poynter, and was issued each year between 1893 and 1901, the year of Victoria's death.

=== Edward VII (1901–1910) ===
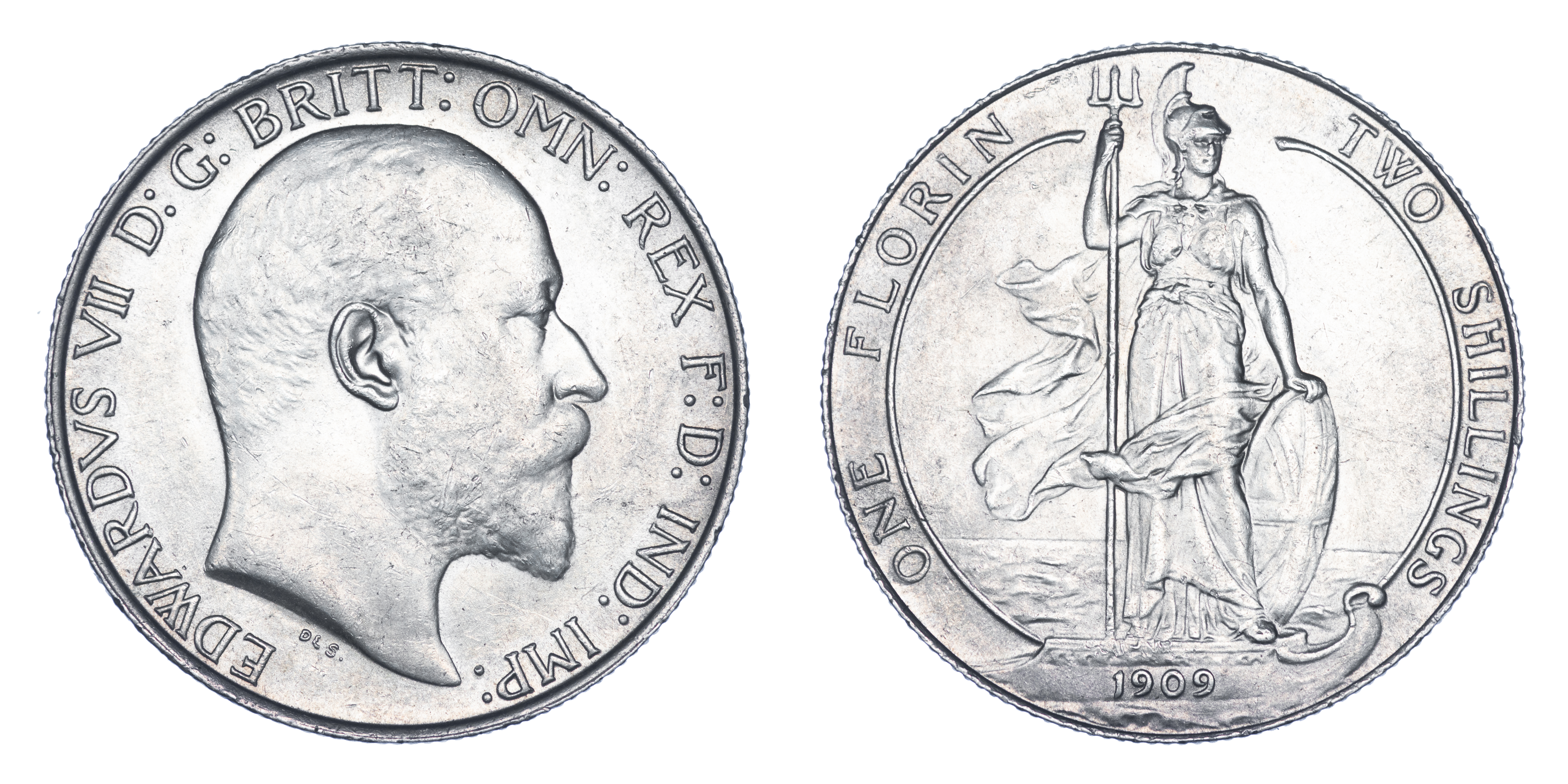
1909 florin, designed by George William de Saulles

Both sides of the florin were redesigned following the accession of Victoria's son, Edward VII, each design being created by the Chief Engraver of the Royal Mint, George William de Saulles. The florin of King Edward VII was minted every year from 1902 to 1910. Its specifications remained at 11.3 grams (0.40 oz) weight and 28.5 millimetres (1.12 in) diameter. The obverse shows the right-facing head of the King, inscribed EDWARDVS VII DEI GRA BRITT OMN REX FD IND IMP, (Note: Edwardus VII Dei Gratia Britanniarum Omnium Rex Fidei Defensor Indiae Imperator, or Edward VII, by the Grace of God King of All the Britains, Defender of the Faith, Emperor of India) while the other side features what Coincraft's Standard Catalogue of English and UK Coins deems "a most unusual and original reverse". It shows a windswept figure of Britannia standing holding a shield with her left hand and a trident with her right, and inscribed ONE FLORIN TWO SHILLINGS, with the date below. Peter Seaby, in his history of British coinage, described the figure of Britannia as "standing on some mythical ancient ship which could hardly be sea-worthy under her weight", but "a pleasing composition".

De Saulles created the new florin in this manner to distinguish the coin from the half crown, as there had been complaints of confusion. He probably based the design on his British trade dollar (1895). The sitter for the design was Susan Hicks-Beach, the daughter of Michael Hicks-Beach, 1st Earl St Aldwyn who had served as Chancellor of the Exchequer and ex officio Master of the Mint. The modern-day Britannia coinage, bullion pieces struck by the Royal Mint for investors and collectors, has a reverse that strongly resembles that of the Edwardian florin.

=== George V (1910–1936) ===
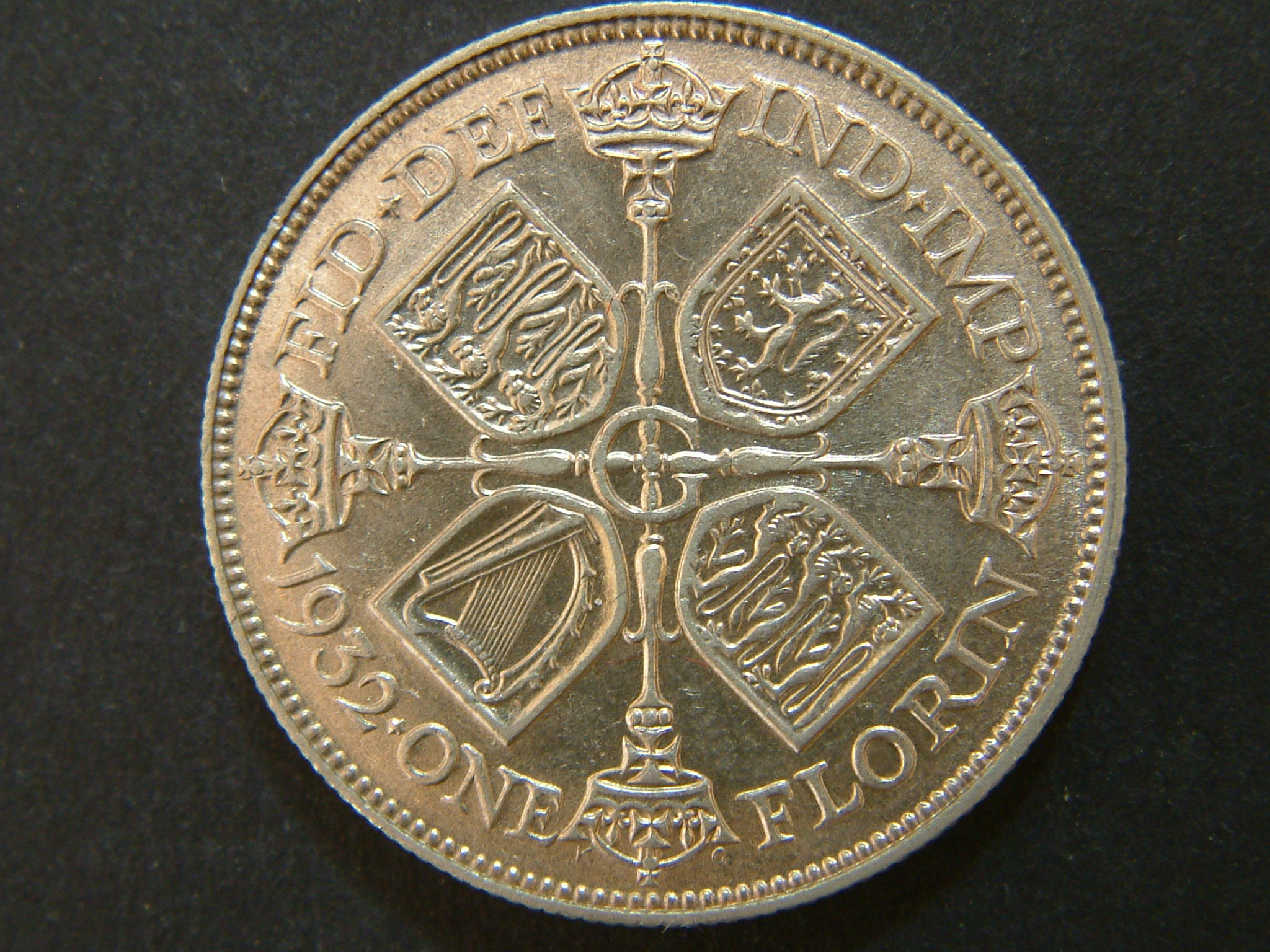
The 1932 florin

Florins bearing a left-facing effigy of George V by Sir Bertram Mackennal were minted in each year of the King's reign (1910–1936) except 1910 and 1934. The initial reverse design (1911–1926) was developed internally at the Royal Mint, and is intended to be that of the 1887 double florin, to which the Jubilee florin is very similar. The weight and diameter of the coin were unchanged but, because of rises in the price of silver, the metallic composition was changed in 1920 from 0.925 silver to 50% silver, 40% copper, 10% nickel, then again in 1922 to 50% silver, 50% copper, and again in 1927 to 50% silver, 40% copper, 5% nickel, 5% zinc. The changes in alloy after 1920 were due to the Mint's trying to find a silver alloy that would remain attractive as it wore. The inscriptions on the obverse of the original version of the George V florin were GEORGIVS V D G BRITT OMN REX F D IND IMP (Note: Georgius V Dei Gratia Britanniarum Omnium Rex Fidei Defensor Indiae Imperator or George V, by the Grace of God King of All the Britains, Defender of the Faith, Emperor of India) and on the reverse were ONE FLORIN and the year of striking.

The modified florin, dated 1927 to 1936, was designed by George Kruger Gray and did not greatly alter the design of shields and sceptres, but removed the crowns from the shields and placed them on the sceptres. A "G", the King's initial, is at the centre of the design. The obverse inscription became GEORGIVS V DEI GRA BRITT OMN REX (Note: Georgius V Dei Gratia Britanniarum Omnium Rex or George V, by the Grace of God King of All the Britains ...) and the reverse one was FID DEF IND IMP (Note: Fidei Defensor Indiae Imperator, or ... Defender of the Faith, Emperor of India) with the date and denomination ONE FLORIN. The bust of the King on the obverse was slightly modified in 1927.

=== Edward VIII (1936) ===
Throughout 1936, the year in which Edward VIII reigned, coins of all denominations continued to be struck using the designs of George V, pending preparation of the new monarch's coinage. No coins depicting Edward VIII were officially released to circulation. A pattern florin exists for King Edward, which would have been due to receive approval around the time the King abdicated in December 1936. Although there is a tradition of alternating the direction the monarch faces with each reign, and George V had faced left, Edward believed that side more flattering. Thus, the obverse depicts the left-facing effigy of the King by Thomas Humphrey Paget inscribed EDWARDVS VIII D G BR OMN REX. (Note: Edward VIII Dei Gratia Britanniarum Omnium Rex or George V, by the Grace of God King of All the Britains ...) The reverse, by Kruger Gray, shows a crowned rose flanked by a thistle and shamrock, with E below the thistle and R below the shamrock, and the inscription FID DEF IND IMP (Note: Fidei Defensor Indiae Imperator, or ... Defender of the Faith, Emperor of India) and TWO SHILLINGS 1937.

=== George VI (1936–1952) ===
George VI's florin, produced each year between 1937 and 1951, looks very much like the one planned for his brother Edward VIII. Like on the patterns for King Edward, the words ONE FLORIN are omitted; they would remain absent for the coin's remaining existence. The obverse, by Thomas Humphrey Paget, shows the left-facing effigy of the King inscribed GEORGIVS VI D G BR OMN REX. The reverse, by Kruger Gray, depicts a crowned rose with a thistle and shamrock on either side. There is a G below the thistle and R below the shamrock, and the inscription FID DEF IND IMP TWO SHILLINGS date until 1948. From 1949, the coins were struck without the IND IMP, in acknowledgement of India's independence. From 1947, the metal content was changed, as for all British silver circulating coins, to 75% copper, 25% nickel. This was due to the need for Britain to return Lend-Lease silver to the United States. The florin's diameter and weight remained unchanged at 11.3 grams (0.40 oz) and 28.5 millimetres (1.12 in), despite the change of alloy.

=== Elizabeth II (1953–1970) ===
Florins were produced for Elizabeth II each year between 1953 and 1967, with proof coins dated 1970. The obverse shows the Mary Gillick head of Queen Elizabeth, inscribed ELIZABETH II DEI GRATIA BRITT OMN REGINA (Note: Elizabeth II Dei Gratia Britanniarum Omnium Regina Fidei Defensor, or Elizabeth II, by the Grace of God Queen of All the Britains, Defender of the Faith) (1953 only) or ELIZABETH II DEI GRATIA REGINA (Note: Elizabeth II Dei Gratia Regina Fidei Defensor, or Elizabeth II, by the Grace of God Queen, Defender of the Faith) (all other years). This change was made to acknowledge the evolving British Commonwealth, which by then contained some republics. The reverse, by Edgar Fuller and Cecil Thomas, depicts a Tudor rose in the centre surrounded by thistles, shamrocks and leeks, with the Latin phrase FID DEF, the denomination and the date. The designs were selected by the Royal Mint Advisory Committee following a public competition. The artists' initials appear either side of the Welsh leek at the bottom of the reverse. When the reverse of the new coin was illustrated in the press, there was no consensus as to which way was up; numismatist H.W.A. Linecar has noted that the second L in SHILLINGS marks the bottom of the coin.

In accordance with the plan for decimalisation of the currency (120 years after this denomination was first introduced in the initial plan to introduce a decimal currency), from 1968 the ten pence coin was introduced of the same size, weight and metal composition as the florin. Thus, the florin ceased to be struck for circulation after the 1967-dated pieces. The new and the old circulated side by side as florins prior to Decimal Day (15 February 1971) and as ten pence pieces after. Florins (usually dated 1947 or later) remained in circulation after Decimal Day. In 1987, following a study of the currency, the Thatcher government announced its intent to issue a new ten pence piece, reduced in size. A smaller ten pence piece was issued in 1992, after which the old florin was demonetised on 30 June 1993. The florin, the first decimal coin, was the last coin in general circulation just prior to decimalisation to be withdrawn.

== Mintages ==
Victoria

- 1849 - 413,320
- 1851 - 1,540
- 1852 - 1,014,552
- 1853 - 3,919,950
- 1854 - 550,413
- 1855 - 831,017
- 1856 - 2,201,760
- 1857 - 1,671,120
- 1858 - 2,239,380
- 1859 - 2,568,060
- 1860 - 1,475,100
- 1862 - 594,000
- 1863 - 938,520
- 1864 - 1,861,200
- 1865 - 1,580,040
- 1866 - 914,760
- 1867 - 423,720
- 1868 - 869,940
- 1869 - 297,000
- 1870 - 1,080,648
- 1871 - 3,425,605
- 1872 - 7,199,690
- 1873 - 5,921,839
- 1874 - 1,642,630
- 1875 - 1,117,030
- 1876 - 580,034
- 1877 - 682,292
- 1878 - 1,786,680
- 1879 - 1,512,247
- 1880 - 2,161,170
- 1881 - 2,376,337
- 1883 - 3,555,667
- 1884 - 1,447,379
- 1885 - 1,758,210
- 1886 - 591,773
- 1887 - 543,525 (Gothic)
- 1887 - 1,233,378 (Jubilee)
- 1888 - 1,647,540
- 1889 - 2,973,561
- 1890 - 1,684,737
- 1891 - 836,438
- 1892 - 283,401
- 1893 - 1,667,415
- 1894 - 1,952,842
- 1895 - 2,182,968
- 1896 - 2,944,416
- 1897 - 1,699,921
- 1898 - 3,061,343
- 1899 - 3,966,953
- 1900 - 5,528,630
- 1901 - 2,648,870

Edward VII

- 1902 - 2,204,698
- 1903 - 995,298
- 1904 - 2,769,932
- 1905 - 1,187,596
- 1906 - 6,910,128
- 1907 - 5,947,895
- 1908 - 3,280,010
- 1909 - 3,482,829
- 1910 - 5,650,713

George V

- 1911 - 5,957,291
- 1912 - 8,571,731
- 1913 - 4,545,278
- 1914 - 21,252,701
- 1915 - 12,357,939
- 1916 - 21,064,337
- 1917 - 11,181,617
- 1918 - 29,211,792
- 1919 - 9,469,292
- 1920 - 15,387,833
- 1921 - 34,863,895
- 1922 - 23,861,044
- 1923 - 21,546,533
- 1924 - 4,582,372
- 1925 - 1,404,136
- 1926 - 5,125,410
- 1927 - 15,000 (Proof Only)
- 1928 - 11,087,186
- 1929 - 16,397,279
- 1930 - 5,733,568
- 1931 - 6,566,331
- 1932 - 717,041
- 1933 - 8,685,303
- 1935 - 7,540,546
- 1936 - 9,897,448

George VI

- 1937 - 13,033,183
- 1938 - 7,909,388
- 1939 - 20,850,607
- 1940 - 18,700,338
- 1941 - 24,451,079
- 1942 - 39,895,245
- 1943 - 26,711,987
- 1944 - 27,560,005
- 1945 - 25,858,049
- 1946 - 22,300,254
- 1947 - 22,910,085
- 1948 - 67,553,838
- 1949 - 28,614,939
- 1950 - 24,375,003
- 1951 - 27,431,747

Elizabeth II

- 1953 - 11,998,710
- 1954 - 13,085,422
- 1955 - 25,887,253
- 1956 - 47,824,500
- 1957 - 33,071,282
- 1958 - 9,564,580
- 1959 - 14,080,319
- 1960 - 13,831,782
- 1961 - 37,735,315
- 1962 - 35,129,903
- 1963 - 25,580,000
- 1964 - 16,313,000
- 1965 - 48,723,000
- 1966 - 84,547,000
- 1967 - 22,000,000
- 1970 - 750,476 (Proof Only)

== Bibliography ==
- Craig, John (2010) [1953]. The Mint (paperback ed.). Cambridge, United Kingdom: Cambridge University Press. ISBN 978-0-521-17077-2.
- Dyer, G.P.; Gaspar, P.P. (1992). "Reform, the New Technology and Tower Hill". In Challis, C.E. (ed.). A New History of the Royal Mint. Cambridge, United Kingdom: Cambridge University Press. pp. 398–606. ISBN 978-0-521-24026-0.
- Josset, Christopher Robert (1962). Money in Britain. London: Frederick Warne and Co Ltd. OCLC 923302099.
- Levi, Leone (1880). The History of British Commerce and of the Economic Progress of the British Nation, 1763–1878 (2nd ed.). John Murray. OCLC 65520225.
- Linecar, H.W.A. (1977). British Coin Designs and Designers. London: G. Bell & Sons Ltd. ISBN 978-0-7135-1931-0.
- Lobel, Richard, ed. (1999) [1995]. Coincraft's Standard Catalogue English & UK Coins 1066 to Date (5th ed.). London: Standard Catalogue Publishers Ltd. ISBN 978-0-9526228-8-8.
- Seaby, Peter (1985). The Story of British Coinage. London: B. A. Seaby Ltd. ISBN 978-0-900652-74-5.
- Spink (2016). Coins of England and the United Kingdom (52nd ed.). London: Spink. ISBN 978-1-907427-98-5.
