= Lady Susan Hicks Beach =

Model for Britannia on English coins (1878 – 1965)

Lady Susan Hicks Beach JP
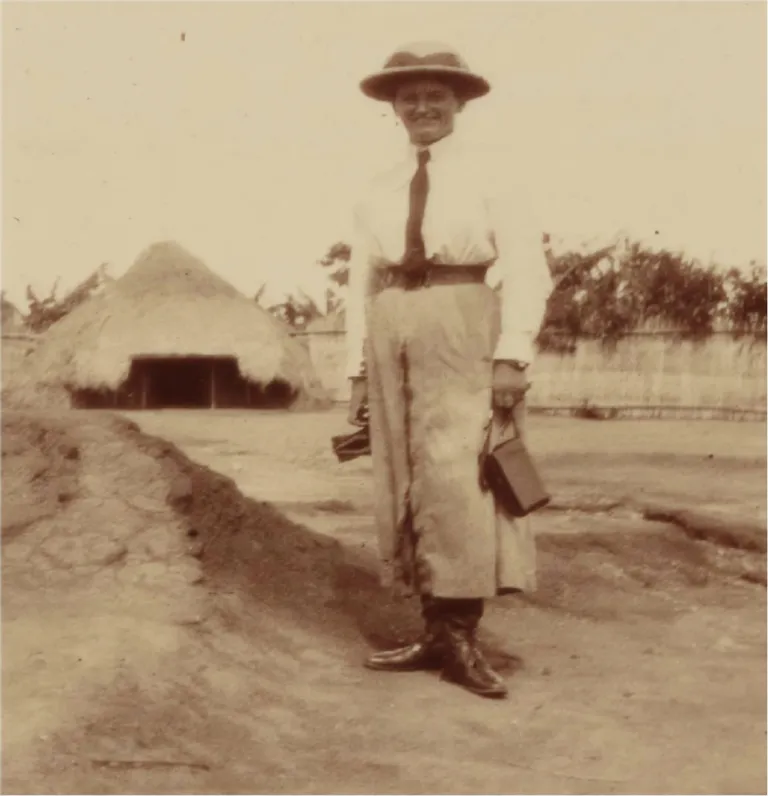
- Lady Susan on a voyage to Africa
- Born: Susan Evelyn Hicks Beach; 15 June 1878; Marylebone, London
- Died: 15 February 1965; Coln St. Aldwyns, Gloucestershire
- Occupations: politician, magistrate, artists' model, diarist, lady's companion
- Parent(s): Michael Hicks Beach, 1st Earl St Aldwyn; Lady Lucy Fortescue

Lady Susan Evelyn Hicks Beach JP (15 June 1878 – 15 February 1965) was an English noblewoman who served as a model for the figure of Britannia on English coinage from 1895 to 1910. She was the travelling companion of the deposed Princess Hélène of Orléans on her journeys to Africa. From World War I onwards she ran the family estate with her sister Victoria and held several voluntary and public service roles, including serving as a justice of the peace, sitting on the district councils of Northleach and Pewsey, and sitting on the parish council of Coln St Aldwyns.

== Early life ==
Susan Hicks Beach was born in London, the third child of Sir Michael Edward Hicks Beach and his wife, Lady Lucy Fortescue, the daughter of the 3rd Earl Fortescue. She had an elder brother, Michael; elder sister, Eleanor; and younger sister Victoria, who was named for her godmother, Queen Victoria.

== Britannia ==
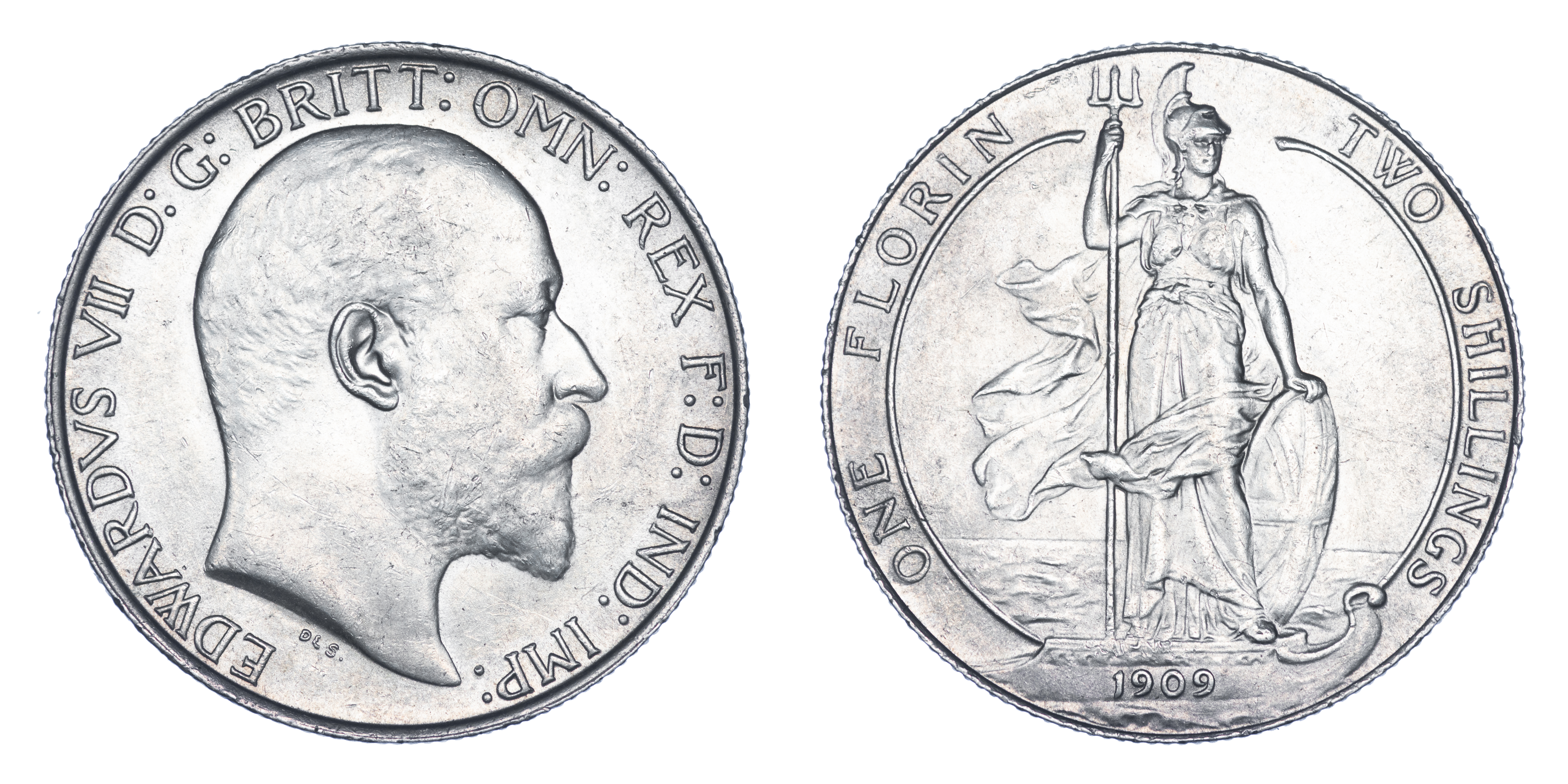
1909 silver florin featuring Susan Hicks Beach as Britannia

In 1895, while her father was Master of the Mint, the seventeen-year-old Susan posed as Britannia with trident and shield for engraver George William de Saulles, who was designing the British trade dollar for Hong Kong and the Far East.

In 1901, de Saulles was commissioned to design the reverse of the florin on the accession of Edward VII. Susan once again served as the model for Britannia, which prompted controversy as the mint had not held an open competition to select the model. The design remained in circulation until 1910.

== Travel ==
In 1907, Susan was introduced to Princess Hélène of Orléans, who was searching for a travelling companion to come to Africa with her. Susan had already travelled widely, especially in India. Susan joined Princess Hélène’s journey to Egypt in December that year, and they were to travel to Africa together several times over the next ten years. Susan kept a journal and photograph album for family use and brought home an anthropological collection.

Hélène's aunt Infanta Eulalia of Spain described their travels:

[Hélène] spends a great deal of her time in Abyssinia... with no companion except an elderly Englishwoman, [she] sets out on a hunting expedition. She is lost in the heart of Africa for months... What she does in Abyssinia nobody knows, if one excepts the elderly Englishwoman.

Despite this description as 'elderly,' Susan was thirty-two at the time.

== Voluntary and public service ==
Susan and her sister Victoria worked on a Red Cross coffee stall in Rouen during World War I. In 1916, Susan was Honorary Secretary of Princess Henry of Battenburg’s Colonial Nursing Association, which funded nursing in British colonies.

Susan returned to England in 1916 to care for her father, who died in April that year. Their brother Michael, Viscount Quenington had died of wounds sustained at the battle of Katia the week before, leaving Susan and Victoria in charge of the family's Williamstrip estate and Cockrup Farm. In the 1940s, the sisters moved to the Manor House at Fittleton.

Lady Susan was a Justice of the Peace, a member of Northleach Rural District Council, and chairman of Coln St Aldwyns Parish Council in the 1930s. In the 1940s and 1950s she served on Pewsey Rural District Council.

After the death of her sister in 1963, she returned to Coln St Aldwyns to live in Lady Lucy cottage, a cottage named after their mother, where she died in 1965.
