= Michael Hicks Beach, 2nd Earl St Aldwyn =

British politician (1912–1992)

The Right Honourable The Earl St Aldwyn GBE GCStJ TD PC DL
- Lord St Aldwyn in 1932

Chief Whip of the House of Lords Captain of the Honourable Corps of Gentlemen-at-Arms
- In office 24 June 1970 – 11 March 1974
- Prime Minister: Edward Heath
- Preceded by: The Lord Beswick
- Succeeded by: The Baroness Llewelyn-Davies of Hastoe
- In office 27 June 1957 – 21 October 1964
- Prime Minister: Harold Macmillan; Alec Douglas-Home
- Preceded by: The Earl Fortescue
- Succeeded by: The Lord Shepherd

Parliamentary Secretary to the Ministry of Agriculture and Fisheries
- In office 18 October 1954 – 18 January 1957
- Prime Minister: Winston Churchill; Anthony Eden; Harold Macmillan
- Preceded by: The Lord Carrington
- Succeeded by: Joseph Godber

Member of the House of Lords Lord Temporal
- In office 9 October 1933 – 29 January 1992; Hereditary peerage
- Preceded by: The 1st Earl St Aldwyn
- Succeeded by: The 3rd Earl St Aldwyn

Personal details
- Born: 9 October 1912 Sudeley, England
- Died: 29 January 1992 (aged 79) Coln St. Aldwyns, England
- Party: Conservative
- Spouse: Diana Mills (m. 1948)
- Children: 3, including Michael

Michael John Hicks Beach, 2nd Earl St Aldwyn GBE GCStJ TD PC DL (9 October 1912 – 29 January 1992) was a British Conservative politician. He achieved the distinction of serving in the governments of five different prime ministers.

== Background and education ==
St Aldwyn was born at Sudeley Castle in 1912, the only son of Michael Hicks Beach, Viscount Quenington, and the grandson of Michael Hicks Beach, 1st Earl St Aldwyn. His mother was Marjorie Brocklehurst, the daughter of Henry Dent Brocklehurst. Across March and April 1916, both his parents and his grandfather died in rapid succession: his mother died on 4 March, his father was killed in action on 23 April, and his grandfather died on 30 April. He succeeded his grandfather in the earldom, aged only three. St Aldwyn was educated at Eton and later fought in the Second World War as a Major in the 1st Royal Gloucestershire Hussars.

== Political career ==
In 1954 St Aldwyn was appointed Joint Parliamentary Secretary to the Ministry of Agriculture and Fisheries in the Conservative administration of Winston Churchill, a post he also held under Anthony Eden and Harold Macmillan (the ministry was renamed the Ministry of Agriculture, Fisheries and Food in 1955).

In 1958 Macmillan promoted him to Captain of the Honourable Corps of Gentlemen-at-Arms (chief government whip in the House of Lords). He retained this post also under Sir Alec Douglas-Home from 1963 to 1964. After the Conservatives lost power in 1964 he served as Chief Opposition Whip in the House of Lords from 1964 to 1970. When the Conservatives returned to power in 1970 under Edward Heath, St Aldwyn was again appointed Captain of the Honourable Corps of Gentlemen-at-Arms, which he remained until the government fell in 1974.

Between 1974 and 1977 he was again Chief Opposition Whip in the House of Lords. Apart from his political career he was also a Justice of the Peace and Deputy lieutenant of Gloucestershire and served as Vice Lord-Lieutenant of Gloucestershire from 1981 to 1987.

== Honours ==
- 5 December 1978: Bailiff Grand Cross (GCStJ) of the Most Venerable Order of the Hospital of Saint John of Jerusalem.
  - 11 January 1966: Knight (KStJ) of the Most Venerable Order of the Hospital of Saint John of Jerusalem.
    - 1 January 1952: Officer (OStJ) of the Most Venerable Order of the Hospital of Saint John of Jerusalem.
- 31 December 1979: Knight Grand Cross (GBE) of the Order of the British Empire.
  - 1 December 1964: Knight Commander (KBE) of the Order of the British Empire.

== Marriage and children ==
Lord St Aldwyn married Diana Mary Christian Mills, daughter of Henry Christian George Mills, on 26 June 1948. They had three sons:

- Michael Henry Hicks-Beach, 3rd Earl St Aldwyn (born 7 February 1950).
- Hon Peter Hugh Hicks-Beach (born 31 May 1952).
- Hon David Seymour Hicks-Beach (born 25 May 1955).

On 29 January 1992, Lord St Aldwyn died at his home in Coln St. Aldwyns from heart disease and colorectal cancer. He was succeeded by his eldest son Michael.

Political offices
Preceded by The Earl Fortescue	Captain of the Honourable Corps of Gentlemen-at-Arms; 1957–1964	Succeeded by The Lord Shepherd
Preceded by The Lord Beswick	Captain of the Honourable Corps of Gentlemen-at-Arms; 1970–1974	Succeeded by The Baroness Llewelyn-Davies
Party political offices
Preceded by The Earl Fortescue	Conservative Chief Whip in the House of Lords; 1957–1978	Succeeded by The Lord Denham
Peerage of the United Kingdom
Preceded by Michael Hicks Beach	Earl St Aldwyn; 1916–1992	Succeeded by Michael Hicks Beach
