= 1916 Tewkesbury by-election =

UK Parliamentary by-election

The 1916 Tewkesbury by-election was held on 16 May 1916. The by-election was held due to the death of the incumbent Conservative MP, Michael Hicks Beach, Viscount Quenington, in the First World War. It was won by the Conservative candidate William Frederick Hicks-Beach, Quenington's uncle, then aged 74.

1916 Tewkesbury by-election
| Party | Candidate | Votes | % | ±% |
|---|---|---|---|---|
| Unionist | William Hicks-Beach | 7,127 | 83.2 | +31.2 |
| Independent | William J Boosey | 1,438 | 16.8 | New |
| Majority | | 5,689 | 66.4 | +62.4 |
| Turnout | | 8,565 | 62.0 | −21.4 |
| Registered electors | | 13,818 | | |
| Unionist hold | | Swing | N/A | |
