= William Hicks-Beach (Tewkesbury MP) =

British politician (1841–1923)

William Frederick Hicks Beach JP (16 July 1841 – 7 September 1923) was the Conservative Party member of parliament (MP) for Tewkesbury from 1916 to 1918, having been returned, aged 74, at a by-election in succession to his nephew, Viscount Quenington, who had been killed in action during the First World War.

He was born in Witcombe Park, near Stroud, Gloucestershire, the younger son of Sir Michael Hicks-Beach, 8th Baronet, and his wife Harriett Vittoria (née Stratton). Michael Hicks-Beach, 1st Earl St Aldwyn, was his elder brother.

He had an active local public life as a justice of the peace of the county of Gloucestershire from 1879, serving eight years as chairman of the Cheltenham bench, and was by 1900 an alderman of Gloucestershire County Council, on which he served as chairman of its Public Health Committee. He was chairman of a Rural District Council for 46 years, and of Gloucester Board of Diocesan Finance. He was made a freeman of the borough of Cheltenham in 1922. He was for eight years master of the Cotswold Hounds.

He married firstly, on 5 July 1865 Elizabeth Caroline Tyrwhitt-Drake (1841–22 January 1901), daughter of Thomas Tyrwhitt-Drake of Shardeloes, by whom he had 5 sons and 3 daughters. His second wife, whom he married on 25 November 1903, was Emily Susan Christian (1866–1958), daughter of Admiral Henry Christian.

He retired from parliament at the 1918 general election and died in 1923 aged 82. He was heir-presumptive to the Hicks-Beach baronetcy but did not live to succeed to the title.

== Notes ==
Parliament of the United Kingdom
Preceded by Michael Hugh Hicks-Beach	Member of Parliament for Tewkesbury; 1916–1918	Constituency abolished
