= Earl St Aldwyn =

Earldom in the Peerage of the United Kingdom

- Blazon Arms: Quarterly: 1st & 4th, Vair Argent and Gules, a Canton Azure, charged with a Pile Or (Beach); 2nd & 3rd, Gules, a Fess wavy, between three Fleurs-de-lis Or (Hicks). Crests: 1st: a Demi-Lion rampant Argent, ducally gorged Or, holding in the paws an Escutcheon Azure, charged with a Pile Or (Beach). 2nd: a Buck’s Head couped at the neck Or, gorged with a wreath of Laurel proper (Hicks). Supporters: Dexter: a Knight armed cap-à-pie in English armour of the 14th century, his jupon charged with the arms of ‘Beach’. Sinister: a Knight armed cap-à-pie in English armour of the 14th century, his jupon charged with the arms of ‘Hicks’.
- Creation date: 22 February 1915
- Created by: King George V
- Peerage: Peerage of the United Kingdom
- First holder: Michael Hicks Beach, 1st Earl St Aldwyn
- Present holder: Michael Hicks Beach, 3rd Earl St Aldwyn
- Heir presumptive: Hon. David Hicks Beach
- Remainder to: the 1st Earl's heirs male of the body lawfull begotten
- Subsidiary titles: Viscount St Aldwyn; Viscount Quenington; Baronet ‘of Beverston Castle’
- Status: Extant
- Motto: TOUT EN BON HEURE (All in good time)

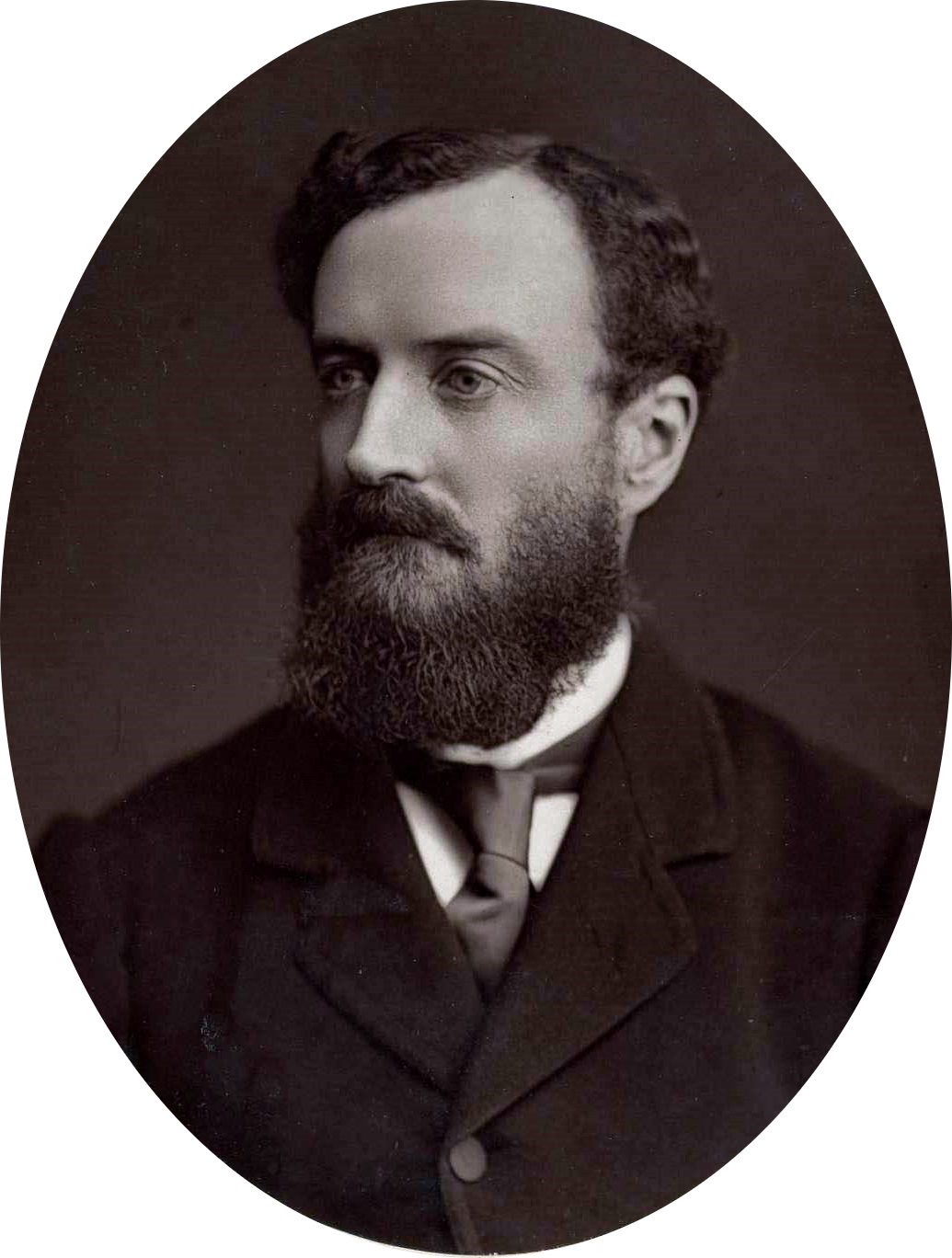
Michael Hicks Beach, 1st Earl St Aldwyn.

Earl St Aldwyn, of Coln St Aldwyn in the County of Gloucester, is a title in the Peerage of the United Kingdom. It was created in 1915 for the prominent Conservative politician Michael Hicks Beach, 1st Viscount St Aldwyn, known from 1854 to 1907 as Sir Michael Hicks Beach, 9th Baronet, of Beverston. He was Chancellor of the Exchequer from 1885 to 1886 and again from 1895 to 1902. Hicks Beach had already been created Viscount St Aldwyn, of Coln St Aldwyn in the County of Gloucester, in 1906, and was made Viscount Quenington, of Quenington in the County of Gloucester, at the same time he was given the earldom. Both titles are in the Peerage of the United Kingdom. He was succeeded by his grandson, the second Earl, the son of Michael Hicks Beach, Viscount Quenington, Member of Parliament for Tewkesbury, who was killed in action in 1916. Lord St Aldwyn was also a Conservative politician and was Captain of the Honourable Corps of Gentlemen-at-Arms (government chief whip in the House of Lords) between 1958 and 1964 and 1970 and 1974. As of 2018 the titles are held by his eldest son, the third Earl, who succeeded in 1992.

The Hicks, later Hicks Beach family, descends from Robert Hicks, a textile merchant in London. His third son Baptist Hicks was created Viscount Campden in 1628 and is the ancestor of the Earls of Gainsborough. Robert Hicks's eldest son Sir Michael Hicks was private secretary to William Cecil, 1st Baron Burghley. His only son William Hicks was created a baronet, of Beverston in the County of Gloucester, in the Baronetage of England in 1619. He later represented Marlow and Tewkesbury in the House of Commons. The line of his eldest son, the second Baronet, failed in 1768 on the death of the latter's grandson, the fourth Baronet. The late Baronet was succeeded by his cousin, the fifth Baronet. He was the son of Charles Hicks.

On his death in 1792 this line of the family also failed and the title passed to his cousin, the sixth Baronet. He was the son of Howe Hicks. He was succeeded by his son, the seventh Baronet. When he died in 1834 the title was inherited by his great-nephew, the eighth Baronet. He was the grandson of Michael Hicks Beach, younger brother of the seventh Baronet, who had assumed the additional surname of Beach when he married Henrietta Maria Beach, only surviving daughter and heiress of William Beach of Netheravon, Wiltshire. Hicks Beach briefly represented Gloucestershire East in Parliament in 1854. He was succeeded by his son, the aforementioned ninth Baronet, who was elevated to the peerage as Viscount St Aldwyn in 1906 and created Earl St Aldwyn in 1915.

The family seat was Williamstrip House, near Coln St Aldwyns, Gloucestershire, until its sale in 2007.

== Hicks, later Hicks Beach baronets, of Beverston (1619) ==
- Sir William Hicks, 1st Baronet (1596–1680)
- Sir William Hicks, 2nd Baronet (1629–1703)
- Sir Henry Hicks, 3rd Baronet (1666–1755)
- Sir Robert Hicks, 4th Baronet (died 1768)
- Sir John Baptist Hicks, 5th Baronet (died 1792)
- Sir Howe Hicks, 6th Baronet (1722–1801)
- Sir William Hicks, 7th Baronet (1754–1834)
- Sir Michael Hicks Hicks Beach, 8th Baronet (1809–1854)
- Sir Michael Edward Hicks Beach, 9th Baronet (1837–1916) (created Viscount St Aldwyn in 1906 and Earl St Aldwyn in 1915)

== Earls St Aldwyn (1915) ==
- Michael Edward Hicks Beach, 1st Earl St Aldwyn (1837–1916)
  - Michael Hugh Hicks Beach, Viscount Quenington (1877–1916)
- Michael John Hicks Beach, 2nd Earl St Aldwyn (1912–1992)
- Michael Henry Hicks Beach, 3rd Earl St Aldwyn (b. 1950)

The heir presumptive is the present holder's brother the Hon. David Seymour Hicks Beach (b. 1955)
The heir presumptive's heir apparent is his son Peter Etienne Hicks Beach (b. 1998). He is the last in remainder to the earldom, though there are other heirs to the baronetcy.

== See also ==
- Earl of Gainsborough
- William Wither Bramston Beach
- William Frederick Hicks Beach
