= Michael Hicks Beach, 3rd Earl St Aldwyn =

British peer, baronet, and businessman

Michael Henry Hicks Beach, 3rd Earl St Aldwyn (born 7 February 1950) is a British peer, baronet, and businessman. He was a member of the House of Lords from 1992 to 1999.

The eldest of the three sons of Michael Hicks Beach, 2nd Earl St Aldwyn, and his wife Diana Mary Christian Mills, he was educated at Eton College and Christ Church, Oxford. He succeeded his father as Earl St Aldwyn and Viscount Quenington in 1992 and is also 11th Baronet, of Beverstone Castle, in the baronetage of England, a title created for his ancestor Sir William Hicks in 1619. Since 1994 he has been managing director of International Fund Marketing (UK) Ltd.

In 1982, he married firstly Gilda Maria, daughter of João Adolfo Pinto da Cunha Saavedra, of Rio de Janeiro. In 2005 he married secondly Mrs Louise Wigan, née Mostyn. With his first wife he has two daughters

- Lady Atalanta Maria Hicks-Beach (born 1983)
- Lady Aurora Ursula Hicks-Beach (born 1988)

The heir presumptive to the peerages is St Aldwyn’s younger brother David Seymour Hicks-Beach (born 1955), who was Page of Honour to Queen Elizabeth II between 1969 and 1972 and is now the owner of The Bones Dogalogue, a mail order firm for dogs. In 1993 he married Katrina Louise Susannah Henriques and has a daughter and a son.
