= Coln St Aldwyns =

Village in Gloucestershire, England

Coordinates: 51.74621°N 1.79138°W

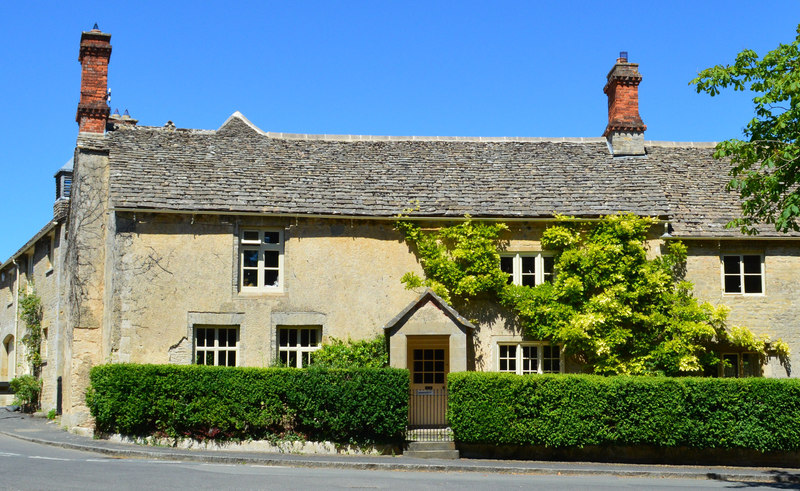
- The Malt House

- Location within Gloucestershire
- Population: 271 (2011)
- OS grid reference: SP145053
- Civil parish: Coln St Aldwyns
- District: Cotswold
- Shire county: Gloucestershire
- Region: South West
- Country: England
- Sovereign state: United Kingdom
- Post town: CIRENCESTER
- Postcode district: GL7
- Dialling code: 01285
- Police: Gloucestershire
- Fire: Gloucestershire
- Ambulance: South Western
- UK Parliament: North Cotswolds

Coln St Aldwyns (sometimes Coln St Aldwyn) is a village and civil parish in the Cotswold district of the English county of Gloucestershire.

== History ==
=== Name ===
The designation "St Aldwyns" (Culna Sancti Aylwini) is attested from the 12th century, and differentiates the village from Coln Rogers and Coln St. Dennis, situated further along the River Coln. In 1086 in the Domesday Book only a single undifferentiated "Culne" is recorded.

=== Church ===
At some point between 1535 and 1700 the dedication of the church was changed to St John the Baptist (specifically, to his beheading). The church, in the very south of the parish, was mostly built in the late 12th and early 13th centuries with extensive 19th-century renovations, and is protected as a Grade II* listed building.

=== Williamstrip Park ===
Originally owned by the Powle family, the Williamstrip estate consists of an extensive manor and park, the latter dating back to the early 1600s and the parkland being commissioned in 1754. The estate stretches to neighbouring Hatherop and during Enclosure, the boundaries were altered slightly and land was exchanged. The politician Michael Hicks Beach, the first Earl St Aldwyn took up residence here.

== Governance ==
Coln St Aldwyns is part of the Coln Valley ward of the district of Cotswold. It is part of the parliamentary constituency of North Cotswold, represented in the House of Commons by Conservative MP Sir Geoffrey Clifton-Brown. Prior to Brexit in 2020, it was part of the South West England constituency of the European Parliament.
