= Michael Hicks Beach, Viscount Quenington =

British politician

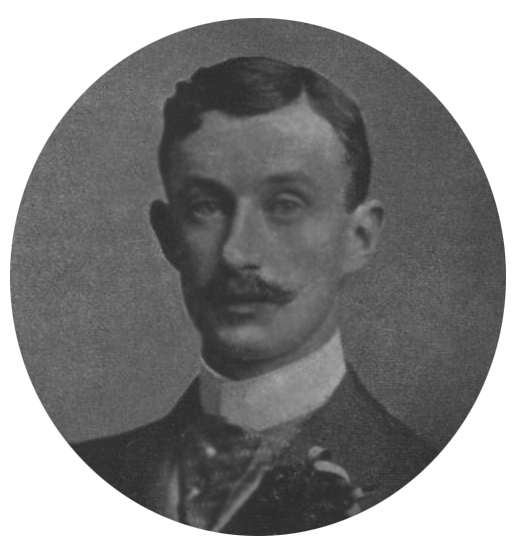
Viscount Quenington from the Roll of Honour published in The Illustrated London News on 6 May 1916.

Michael Hugh Hicks Beach, Viscount Quenington (19 January 1877 – 23 April 1916) was a British politician.

== Biography ==
Hicks-Beach was the eldest son of former Chancellor of the Exchequer, Michael Hicks-Beach, 1st Earl St Aldwyn, and his wife Lady Lucy Catherine Fortescue. He sat as Conservative Member of Parliament (MP) for Tewkesbury from 1906 to 1916 and was a board member at Lloyds Bank.

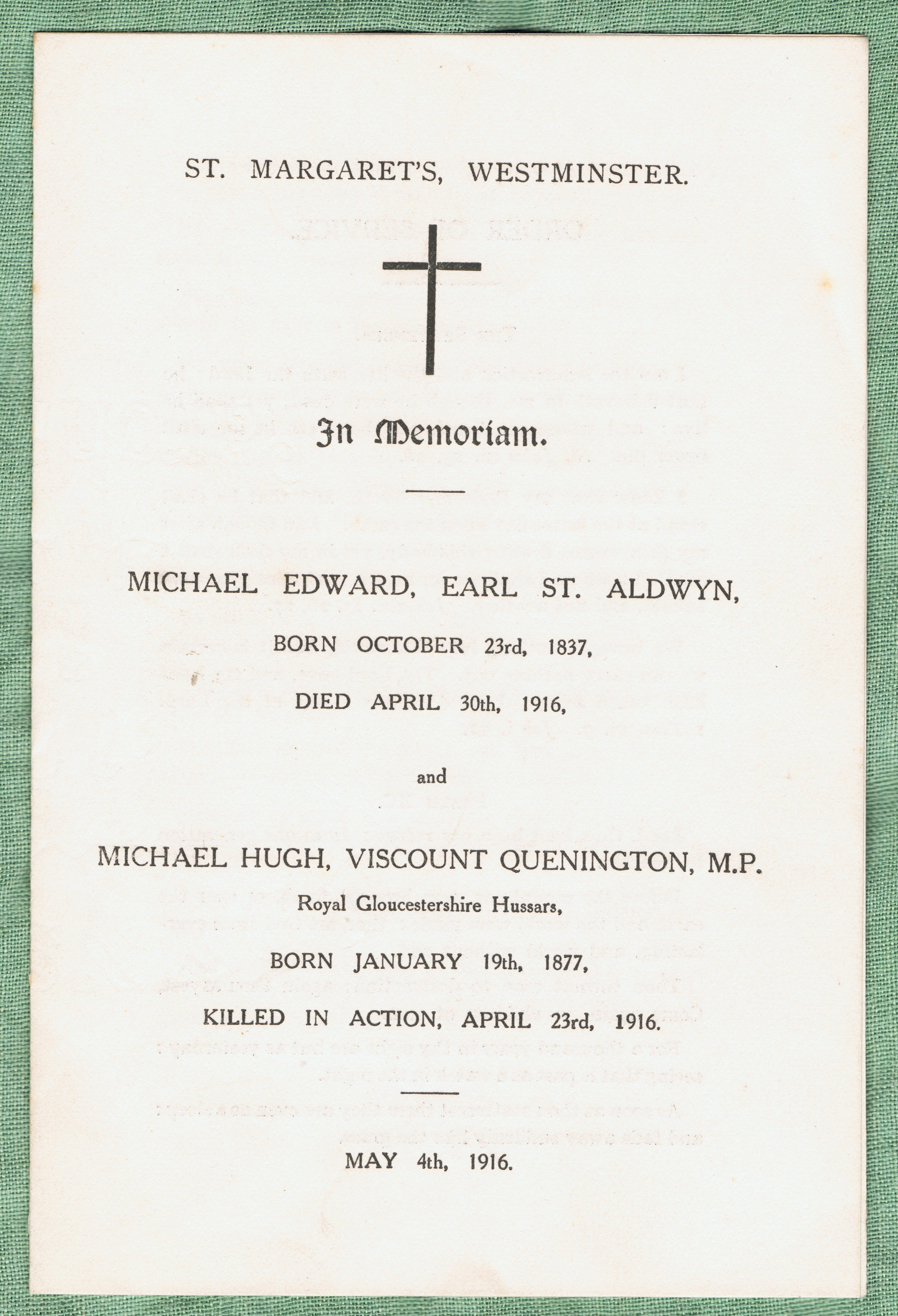
Cover of memorial service sheet, 4 May 1916, for Lord St. Aldwyn (1837–1916) & Viscount Quenington (1877–1916).

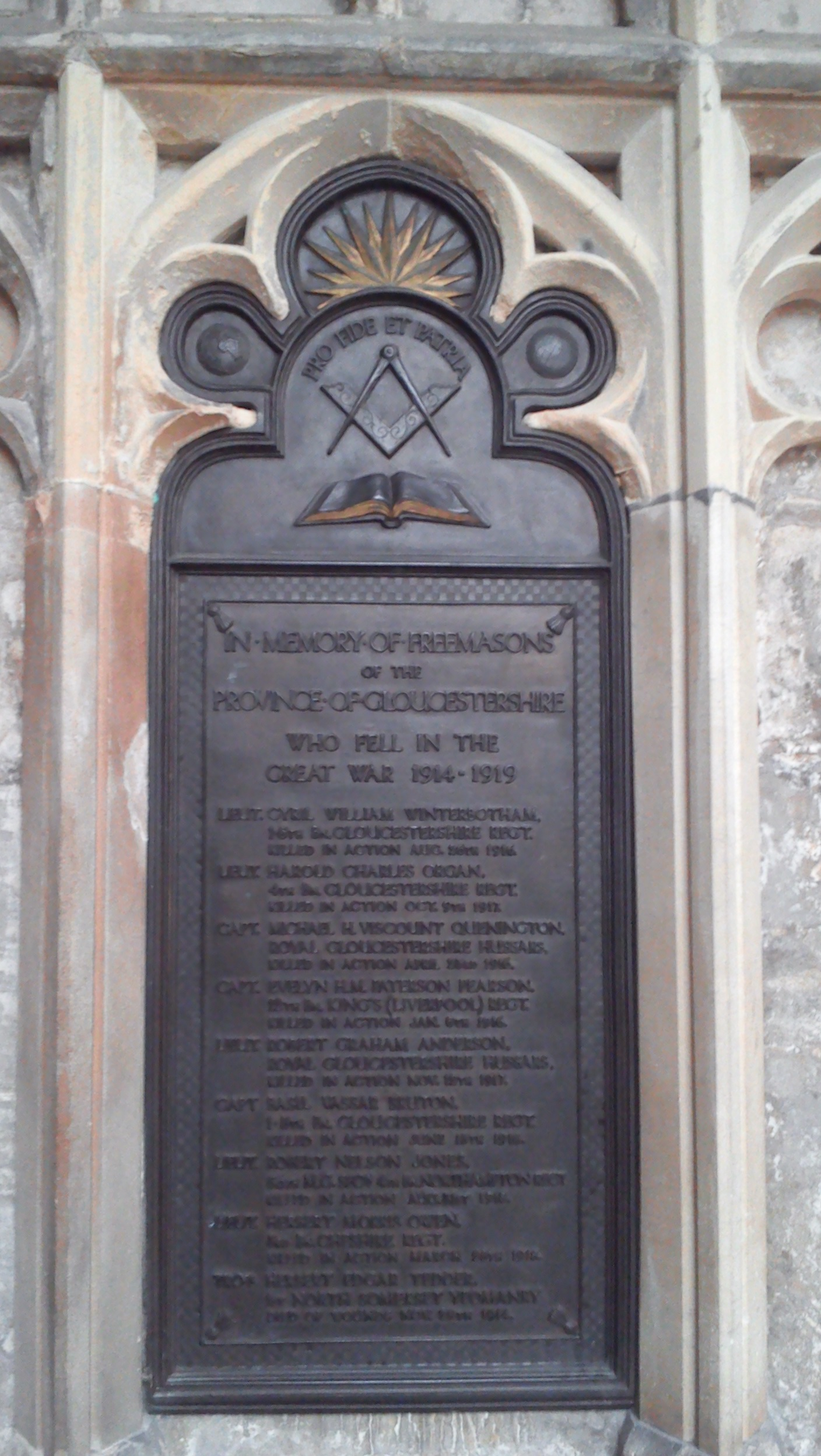
Hicks-Beach named on the Freemasons' War Memorial at Gloucester Cathedral

Hicks-Beach fought in the First World War as a captain with the 1/1st Royal Gloucestershire Hussars and died, aged 39, on 23 April 1916 as a result of wounds received at Katia, Egypt. He is buried at the Cairo New British Protestant Cemetery alongside his wife. Viscount Quenington is commemorated on Panel 8 of the Parliamentary War Memorial in Westminster Hall, one of 22 MPs that died during World War I to be named on that memorial. Viscount Quenington is one of 19 MPs who fell in the war who are commemorated by heraldic shields in the Commons Chamber. A further act of commemoration came with the unveiling in 1932 of a manuscript-style illuminated book of remembrance for the House of Commons, which includes a short biographical account of the life and death of Viscount Quenington.

From 1915, when his father was created 1st Earl St Aldwyn, Hicks-Beach held the courtesy title of Viscount Quenington.

== Marriage and children ==
Hicks-Beach married Marjorie Brocklehurst, daughter of Henry Dent Brocklehurst of Sudeley Castle, on 28 September 1909. They had two children:

- Lady Delia Mary Hicks-Beach (born 2 August 1910, died 29 November 2006), married Brigadier Sir Michael Dillwyn-Venables-Llewelyn, MVO, 3rd Bt. They were the parents of John Dillwyn-Venables-Llewelyn.
- Michael John Hicks-Beach, 2nd Earl St Aldwyn (born 9 October 1912, died 29 January 1992).

Lady Quenington died in Egypt on 4 March 1916, less than two months before her husband. Their son Michael succeeded his grandfather in the earldom only a week after his father's death. He also became a prominent politician.

Parliament of the United Kingdom
| Preceded by Sir John Dorington, Bt | Member of Parliament for Tewkesbury; 1906–1916 | Succeeded by William Frederick Hicks-Beach |
