= Michael Hicks Beach, 1st Earl St Aldwyn =

British politician (1837–1916)

The Right Honourable The Earl St Aldwyn Bt PC DL
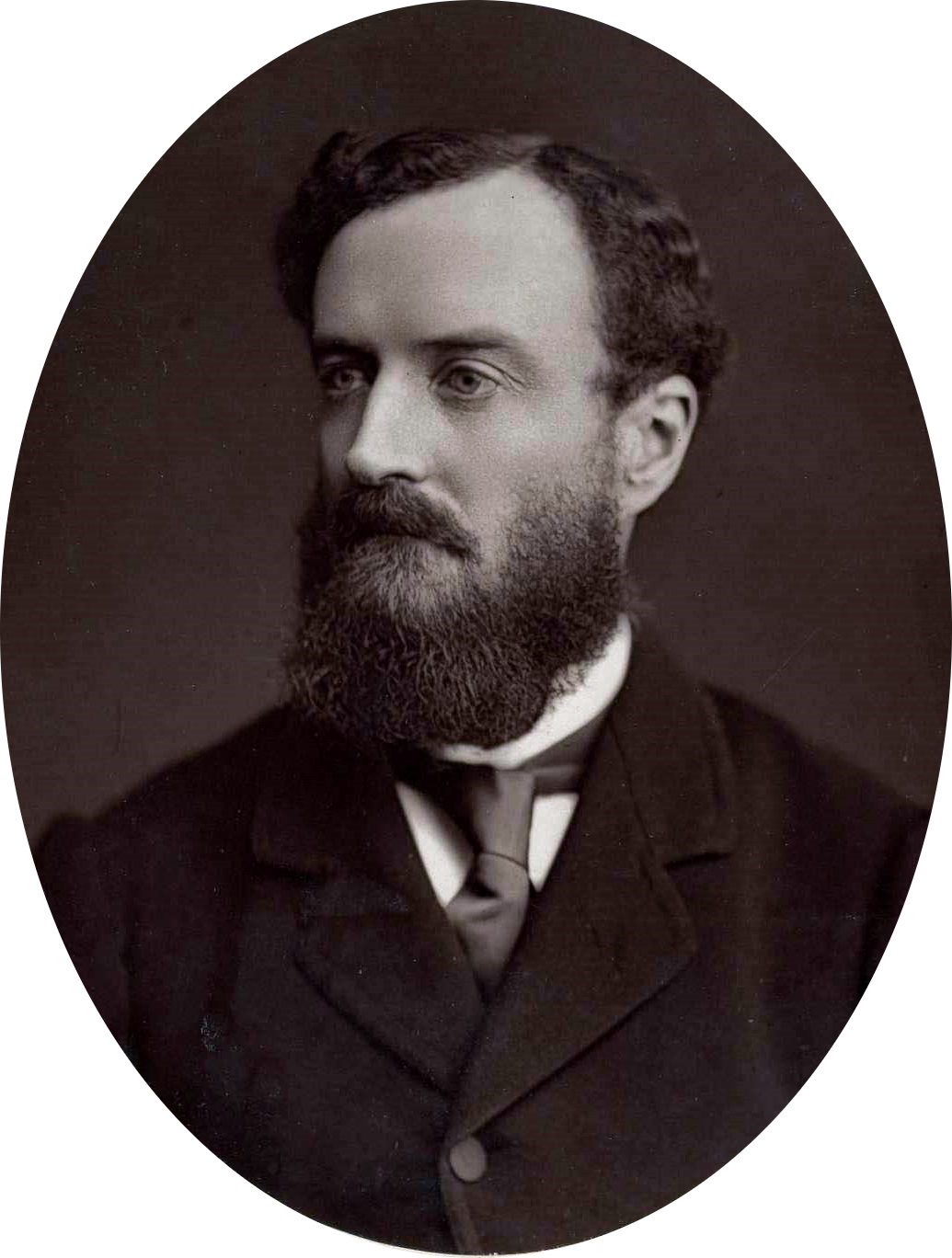

Chancellor of the Exchequer
- In office 29 June 1895 – 11 August 1902
- Monarchs: Victoria; Edward VII
- Prime Minister: The Marquess of Salisbury
- Preceded by: Sir William Harcourt
- Succeeded by: Charles Ritchie
- In office 24 June 1885 – 28 January 1886
- Monarch: Victoria
- Prime Minister: The Marquess of Salisbury
- Preceded by: Hugh Childers
- Succeeded by: Sir William Harcourt

President of the Board of Trade
- In office 21 February 1888 – 11 August 1892
- Monarch: Victoria
- Prime Minister: The Marquess of Salisbury
- Preceded by: The Lord Stanley of Preston
- Succeeded by: A. J. Mundella

Personal details
- Born: 23 October 1837 London, England
- Died: 30 April 1916 (aged 78) Coln St Aldwyn, Gloucestershire, England
- Party: Conservative
- Spouses: Caroline Susan Elwes (m. 1864; died 1865); Lady Lucy Catherine Fortescue (m. 1874)
- Children: 4, including Michael
- Education: Christ Church, Oxford

Michael Edward Hicks Beach, 1st Earl St Aldwyn, PC, DL (23 October 1837 – 30 April 1916), known as Sir Michael Hicks Beach, Bt, from 1854 to 1906 and subsequently as The Viscount St Aldwyn to 1915, was a British Conservative politician. Known as "Black Michael", he was notably Chancellor of the Exchequer from 1885 to 1886 and again from 1895 to 1902 and also led the Conservative Party in the House of Commons from 1885 to 1886. Due to the length of his service, he was Father of the House from 1901 to 1906, when he took his peerage.

== Background and education ==
Born at Portugal Street in London, Hicks Beach was the son of Sir Michael Hicks Beach, 8th Baronet, of Beverston, and his wife Harriett Vittoria, second daughter of John Stratton. He was educated at Eton College and Christ Church, Oxford, where he graduated with a first class degree in the School of Law and Modern History in 1858. In 1854 he succeeded his father as ninth Baronet.

== Political career, 1864–1888 ==
In 1864 he was returned to Parliament as a Conservative for East Gloucestershire. During 1868 he acted both as Parliamentary Secretary to the Poor Law Board and as Under-Secretary of State for Home Affairs. In 1874 he was made Chief Secretary for Ireland, and was included in the Cabinet in 1877. From 1878 to 1880 he was Secretary of State for the Colonies. In 1885 he was elected for Bristol West, and became Chancellor of the Exchequer and Leader of the House of Commons. After Gladstone's brief Home Rule Ministry in 1886 Hicks Beach entered Lord Salisbury's next Cabinet again as Irish Secretary, making way for Lord Randolph Churchill as Leader of the House; but troubles with his eyesight compelled him to resign in 1887.

== Political career, 1888–1902 ==
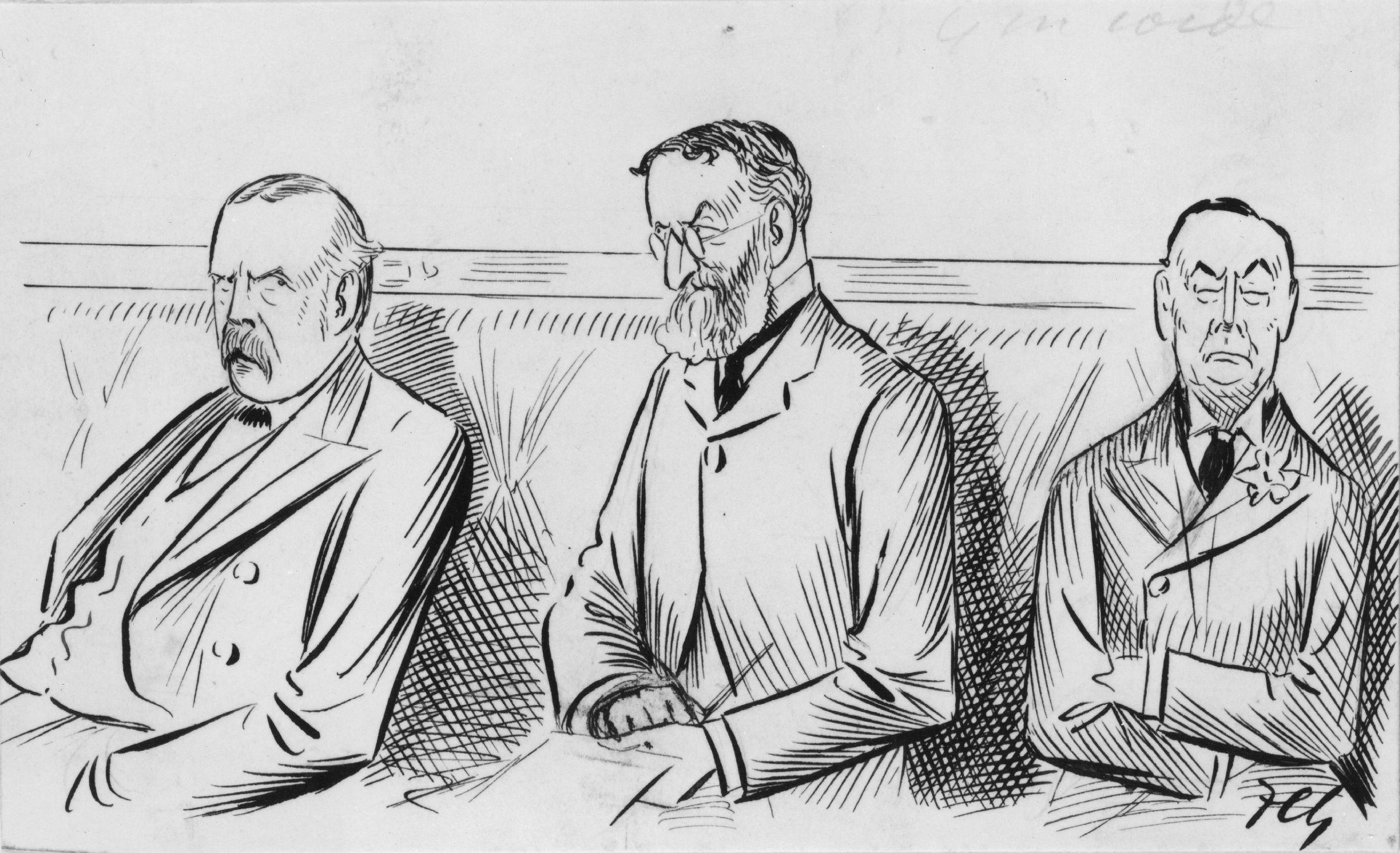
Michael Hicks Beach (centre) with Arthur Balfour (left) and Joseph Chamberlain (right), by Sir Francis Carruthers Gould.

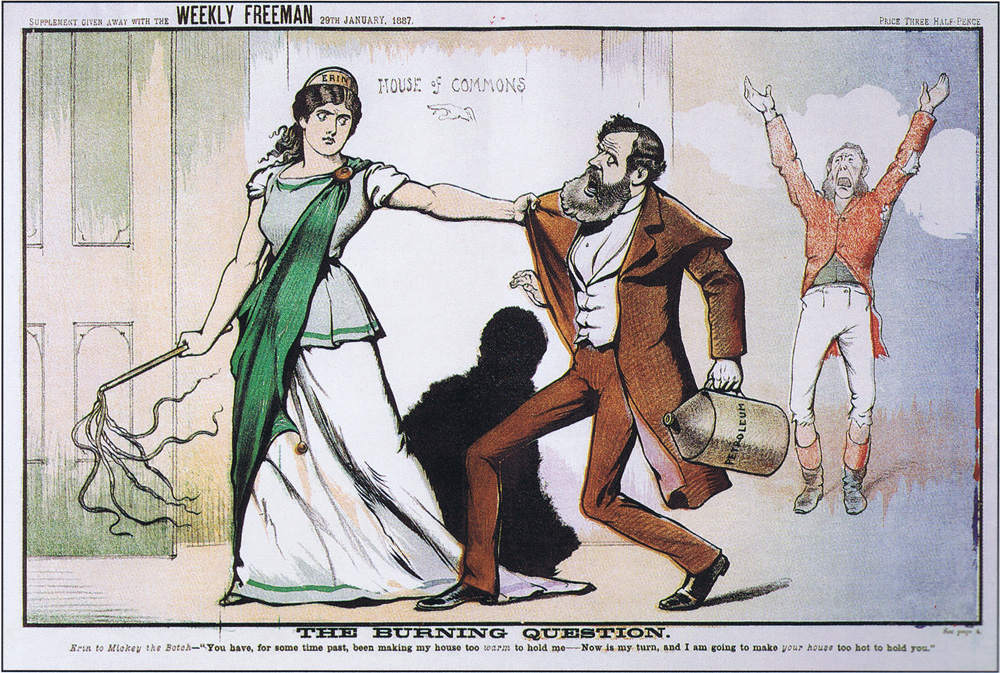
1887 cartoon of Hicks Beach ("Mickey the Botch") being dragged to the House of Commons by Erin.

From 1888 to 1892 Hicks Beach returned to active work as President of the Board of Trade, and in 1895, Goschen being transferred to the Admiralty, he again became Chancellor of the Exchequer. In 1899 he lowered the fixed charge for the National Debt from twenty-five to twenty-three million, a reduction imperatively required, apart from other reasons, by the difficulties found in redeeming Consols at their then inflated price. When compelled to find means for financing the war in South Africa, he insisted on combining the raising of loans with the imposition of fresh taxation; and besides raising the income-tax each year, he introduced taxes on sugar and exported coal (1901), and in 1902 reimposed the registration duty on corn and flour which had been abolished in 1869 by Lowe. The sale of his Netheravon estates in Wiltshire to the War Office in 1898 occasioned some acrid criticism concerning the valuation, for which, however, Sir Michael himself was not responsible. On Lord Salisbury's retirement in August 1902 Hicks Beach also left the government.

Following his resignation, Sir Michael and Lady Lucy Hicks Beach, with their family, visited Egypt in late 1902.

== Other public appointments ==
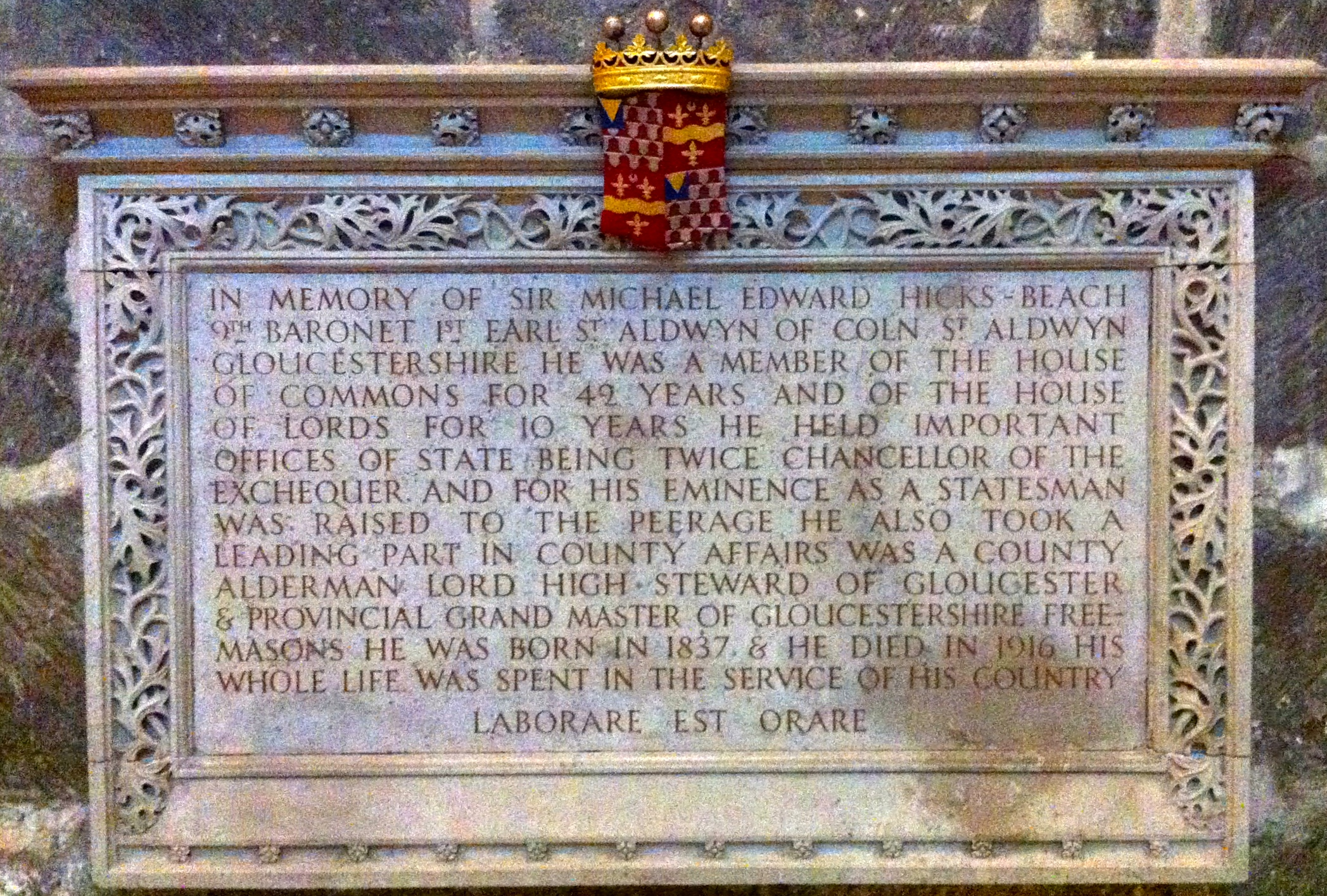
Memorial to Sir Michael Edward Hicks Beach in Gloucester Cathedral

He accepted the chairmanship of the Royal Commission on Ritualistic Practices in the Church, and he did valuable work as an arbitrator; and though when the fiscal controversy arose he became the first president of the Unionist Free Food League, his parliamentary loyalty to Balfour did much to prevent the Unionist free-traders from precipitating a rupture. Hicks-Beach was appointed to be a Deputy Lieutenant for the county of Gloucestershire in 1861. In 1906 he was raised to the peerage as Viscount St Aldwyn, of Coln St Aldwyn, in the County of Gloucester, and in 1915 he was further honoured when he was made Viscount Quenington, of Quenington, in the County of Gloucester, and Earl St Aldwyn, of Coln St Aldwyn, in the County of Gloucester.

== Family ==
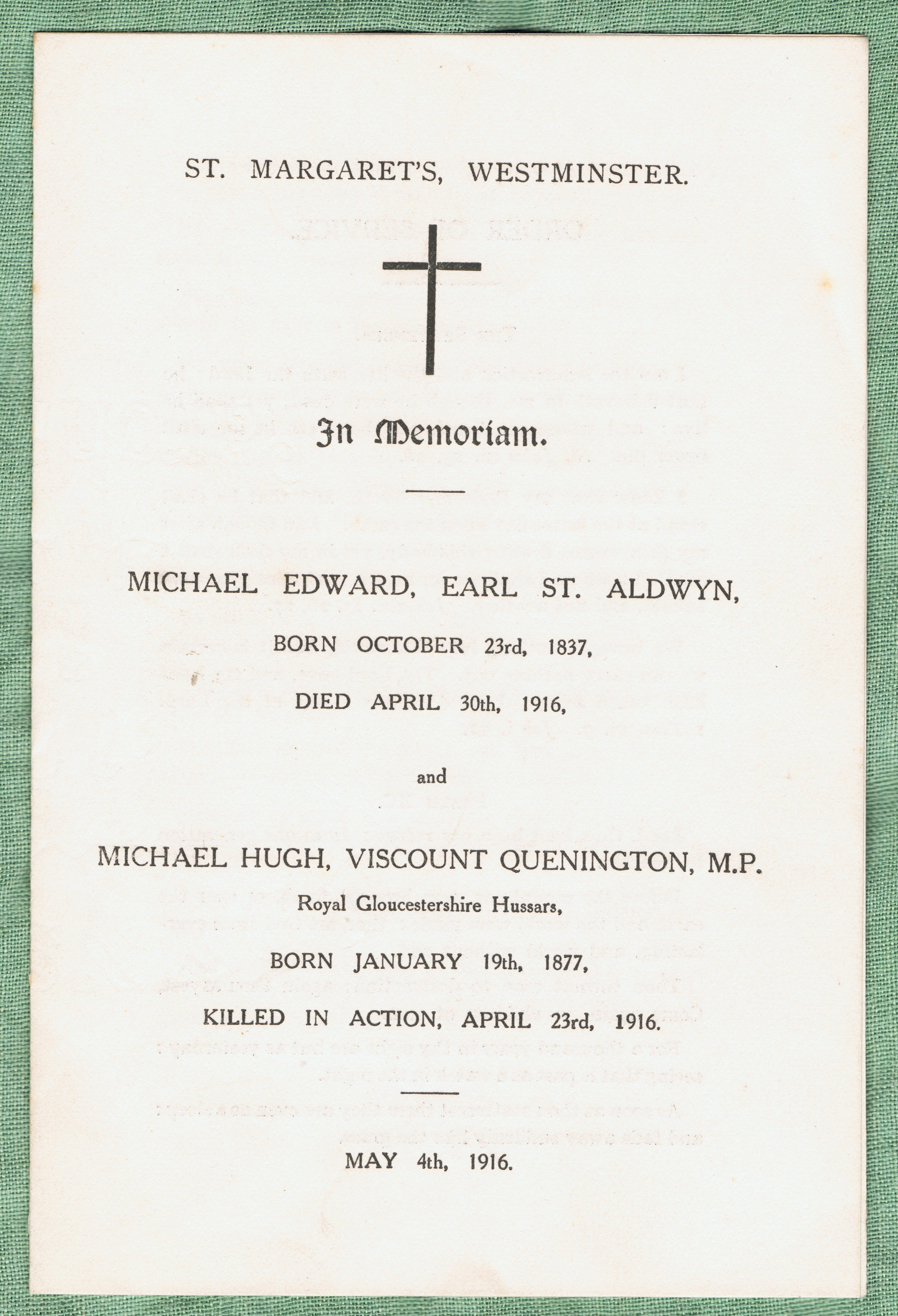
Memorial service booklet for Lord St Aldwyn and his son

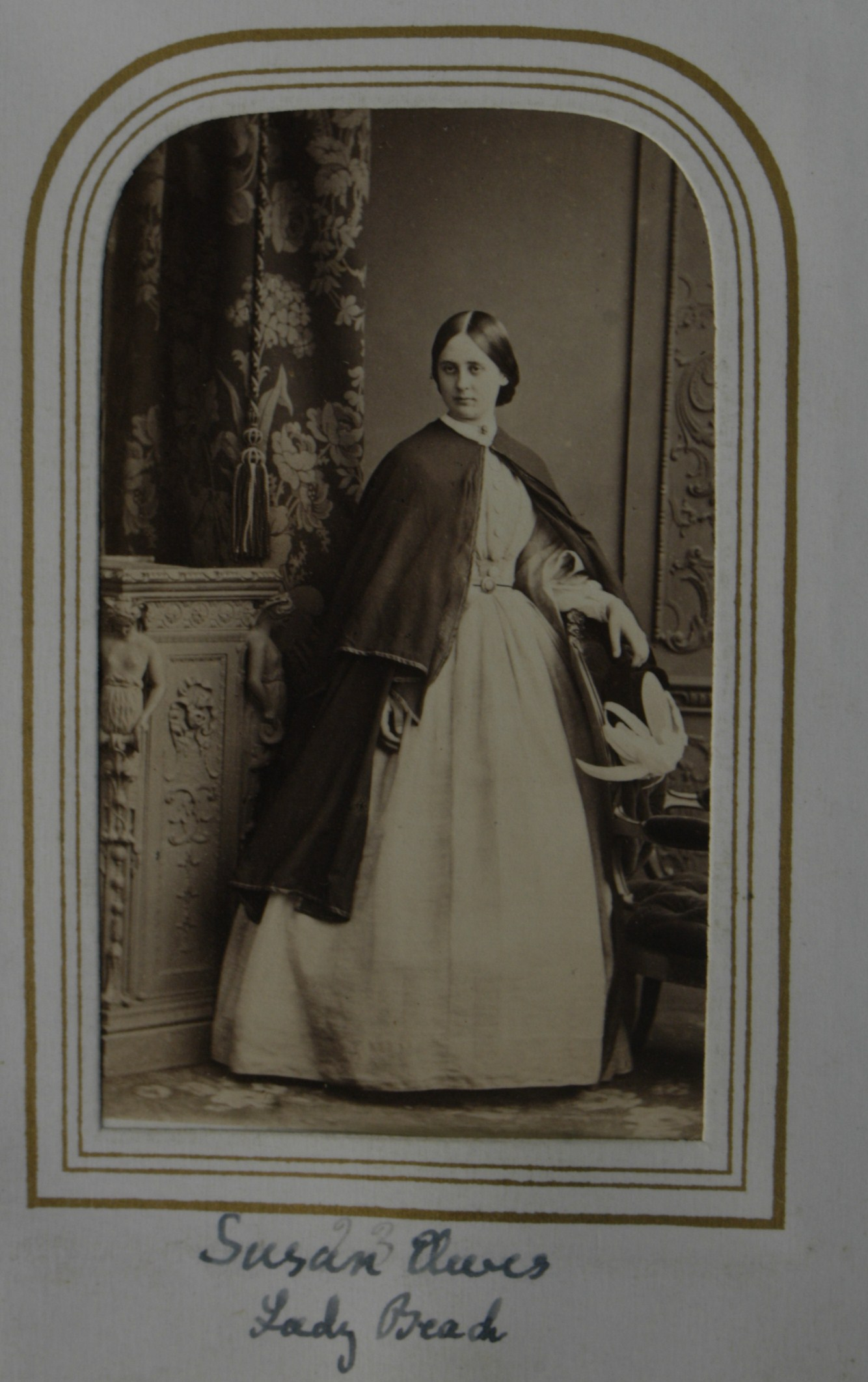
Susan Elwes, aka Lady Hicks Beach.

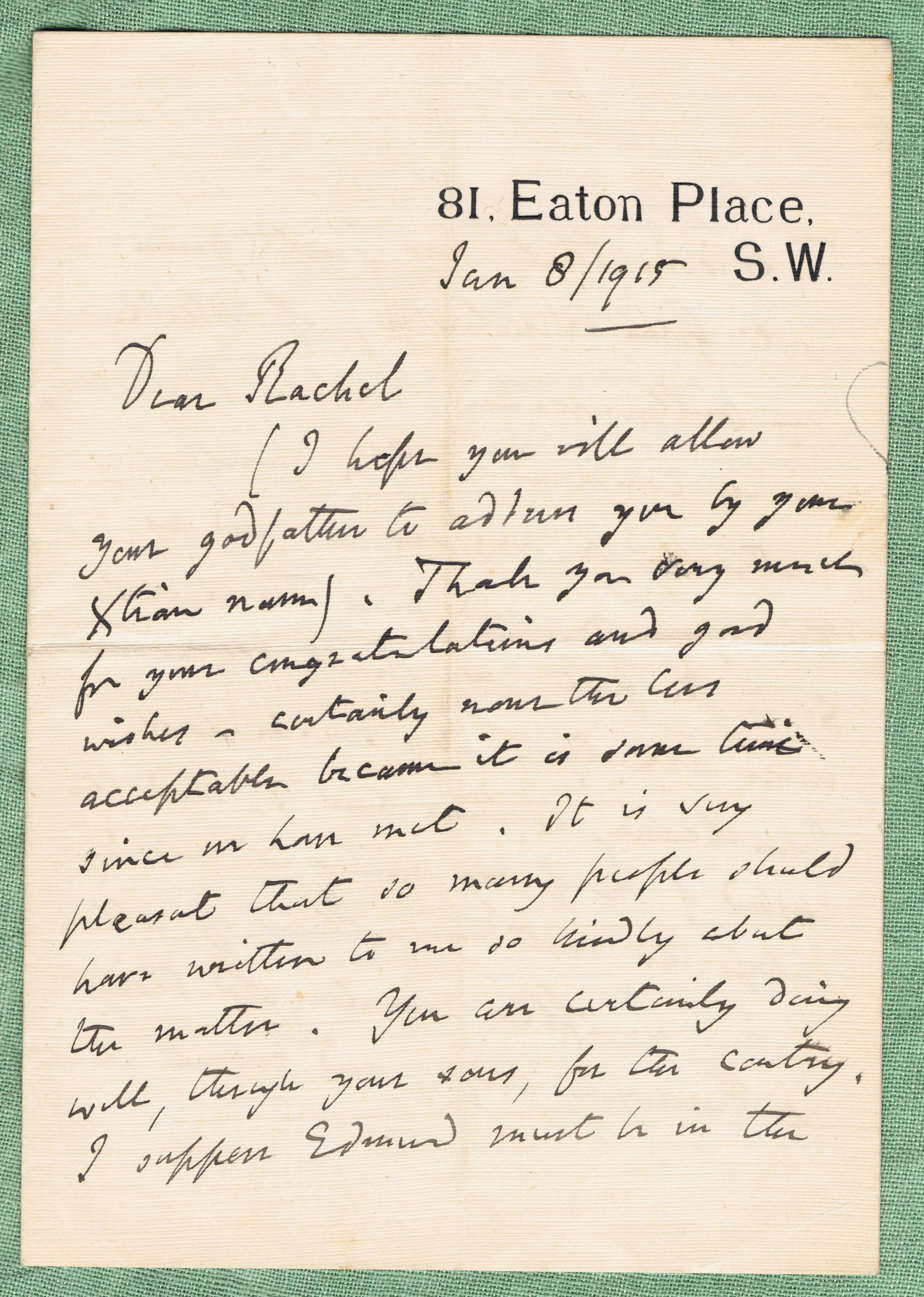
Part of a letter from St. Aldwyn, 8 January 1915.

Lord St Aldwyn married firstly (6.1.1864, South Molton, Devon), Caroline Susan Elwes (3 Prior Buildings, Cheltenham 4 April 1845 – 41 Portman Square, Marylebone 14 August 1865), daughter of John Henry Elwes by Mary Bromley, sister of Henry John Elwes, and secondly Lady Lucy Catherine Fortescue, daughter of Hugh Fortescue, 3rd Earl Fortescue, in 1874. They had one son, Viscount Quenington, also a politician, and three daughters.

His second daughter, Susan Hicks Beach (1878-1965), was the sitter representing Britannia on the reverse of the Edward VII silver florins (two shilling pieces) issued from 1902 to 1910 and designed by George William de Saulles. She resided with her mother for sundry years subsequent to World War II, cultivating and caring for the family land in the Cotswolds.

Lord St Aldwyn died in April 1916, aged 78, only a week after his son was killed in action in the First World War, and was succeeded in his titles by his grandson Michael, who also became a Conservative politician. Lucy, The Countess St Aldwyn had been involved with Elizabeth Malleson in the creating of a Rural Nursing Association in the 1880s. This organisation was successful and incorporated in similar initiatives by Queen Victoria. The countess died in March 1940. The coastal town of Beachport in the Australian state of South Australia was named after Lord St Aldwyn in 1878.

Parliament of the United Kingdom
Preceded by Sir Christopher William Codrington; Marquess of Worcester	Member of Parliament for Gloucestershire East; 1864–1885; With: Robert Stayner Holford 1864–1872; John Yorke 1872–1885	Constituency abolished
New constituency	Member of Parliament for Bristol West; 1885–1906	Succeeded by George Gibbs
Preceded by Bramston Beach	Father of the House of Commons; 1901–1906	Succeeded by George Finch
Political offices
Preceded by George Sclater-Booth	Parliamentary Secretary to the Poor Law Board; February–August 1868	Succeeded by Arthur Peel
Preceded by Sir James Fergusson	Under-Secretary of State for the Home Department; August–December 1868	Succeeded by Edward Knatchbull-Hugessen
Preceded by Marquess of Hartington	Chief Secretary for Ireland; 1874–1878	Succeeded by James Lowther
Preceded by The Earl of Carnarvon	Secretary of State for the Colonies; 1878–1880	Succeeded by The Earl of Kimberley
Preceded by Hugh Childers	Chancellor of the Exchequer; 1885–1886	Succeeded by Sir William Harcourt
Preceded by William Ewart Gladstone	Leader of the House of Commons; 1885–1886	Succeeded by William Ewart Gladstone
Preceded by John Morley	Chief Secretary for Ireland; 1886–1887	Succeeded by Arthur Balfour
Preceded by –	Minister without Portfolio; 1887–1888	Succeeded by –
Preceded by The Lord Stanley of Preston	President of the Board of Trade; 1888–1892	Succeeded by A. J. Mundella
Preceded by Sir William Harcourt	Chancellor of the Exchequer; 1895–1902	Succeeded by Charles Ritchie
Party political offices
Preceded by Earl Percy	Chairman of the National Union of Conservative and Constitutional Associations (jointly with Lord Randolph Churchill); 1884	Succeeded by Lord Claud Hamilton
Preceded by Sir Stafford Northcote	Conservative Leader of the Commons; 1885–1886	Succeeded by Lord Randolph Churchill
Church of England titles
Preceded by Sir John Mowbray	Third Church Estates Commissioner; 1892–1895	Succeeded by Charles Stuart-Wortley
Peerage of the United Kingdom
New creation	Earl St Aldwyn; 1915–1916	Succeeded by Michael Hicks Beach
New creation	Viscount St Aldwyn; 1906–1916	Succeeded by Michael Hicks Beach
Baronetage of the United Kingdom
Preceded by Michael Hicks Beach	Baronet (of Beverston); 1854–1916	Succeeded by Michael Hicks Beach
